= List of Richmond Football Club players =

This is a list of Richmond Football Club players who have made one or more appearance in the Australian Football League (AFL), known as the Victorian Football League (VFL) until 1990. Richmond entered the VFL in 1908.

== VFL/AFL players ==
Key
Order	Players are listed in order of debut
Seasons	Includes Richmond only careers and spans from the season of the player's debut to the year in which they played their final game for Richmond
Debut	Debuts are for VFL/AFL regular season and finals series matches only
Games	Statistics are for VFL/AFL regular season and finals series matches only and are correct to the end of 2025.
Goals	Statistics are for VFL/AFL regular season and finals series matches only and are correct to the end of 2025.
^{^}	Currently listed players

=== 1900s ===
Debut Year	Player	Games	Goals	Years at Club
1908	Bill Bourke	32	45	1908–1909
1908	Bob Bowden	83	5	1908–1912
1908	Bill Burns	54	10	1908–1909, 1912–1913, 1916
1908	Dick Condon	32	26	1908–1909
1908	Jack Hardiman	15	5	1908
1908	Thomas Heaney	56	37	1908–1913
1908	Herbert Hill	24	4	1908–1909
1908	Len Incigneri	62	4	1908–1911
1908	Bill Lang	14	7	1908–1909
1908	Bill Luff	39	0	1908–1910
1908	Bill Mahoney	114	53	1908–1911, 1913–1915, 1920
1908	Ernie McDonald	4	0	1908
1908	Jack Megson	20	3	1908–1909
1908	Ted Ohlson	105	36	1908–1915
1908	Charlie Pannam	14	22	1908
1908	Emmett Ryan	12	2	1908
1908	Billy Schmidt	75	71	1908–1911, 1921
1908	Charles Williams	3	0	1908
1908	Vin Hannaford	1	0	1908
1908	Alex Johnston	1	0	1908
1908	Doug Chapman	23	5	1908–1909
1908	George Gibson	70	6	1908–1912
1908	Ivor Lawson	32	3	1908–1909
1908	Stan O'Connell	5	3	1908
1908	Jack Pemberton	3	0	1908
1908	Percy Stainer	7	0	1908
1908	Harry Neil	31	0	1908–1910
1908	Syd Barker	2	1	1908
1908	Walter Johnston	1	0	1908
1908	George Rankine	2	0	1908
1908	Percy Speakman	4	4	1908
1908	Fred Larkin	2	0	1908
1908	George St. John	4	1	1908–1909
1908	Frank Sanguinetti	1	0	1908
1909	Paddy Bourke	38	28	1909–1911
1909	Barney Herbert	192	90	1909–1912, 1914–1921
1909	Syd Price	11	7	1909–1910
1909	Bill Tottey	3	0	1909
1909	Joe Bourke	2	1	1909
1909	Hugh James	188	119	1909–1916, 1919–1923
1909	Alex Murray	4	1	1909
1909	George Ward	1	0	1909
1909	Robert Duncan	1	0	1909
1909	Bill Henderson	5	1	1909
1909	Percy Sparks	2	0	1909
1909	Jack Coles	3	2	1909
1909	Ernie Schunke	6	0	1909
1909	Percy Barton	2	0	1909
1909	Ern Hill	2	1	1909
1909	Les Oliver	50	10	1909–1913, 1915
1909	Tom McEwan	2	0	1909
1909	Fred Alder	1	1	1909
1909	Sam Cooke	3	2	1909
1909	Lyster Kirkpatrick	3	0	1909
1909	Frank McCashney	82	8	1909–1915
1909	Joe Kiker	1	1	1909

=== 1910s ===
Debut Year	Player	Games	Goals	Years at Club
1910	Ernest Carter	1	0	1910
1910	Alick Davison	8	1	1910
1910	Frank Ellis	18	0	1910
1910	Les Frauenfelder	2	2	1910
1910	Jim Lacey	4	2	1910
1910	Mick Maguire	39	62	1910–1912
1910	Bobby Scott	12	7	1910–1911
1910	Vic Thorp	262	7	1910–1925
1910	Percy Maybury	128	61	1910–1919
1910	Joe McKenzie	6	1	1910
1910	Les Abbott	31	0	1910–1911
1910	Harry Burton	3	1	1910
1910	John White	2	3	1910
1910	Bruce Godfrey	1	1	1910
1910	Herb Woodhead	7	0	1910–1912
1910	Percy Ellin	1	0	1910
1910	Frank Love	49	0	1910–1914
1910	Sid Reeves	110	7	1910–1919
1910	Bill Scott	1	0	1910
1910	George O'Connor	3	2	1910–1911
1911	Bill Jones	19	6	1911–1912
1911	George May	1	0	1911
1911	Dave Mahoney	2	1	1911
1911	Arch Robinson	1	0	1911
1911	Ted Farrell	41	2	1911–1914
1911	Les Irwin	6	0	1911
1911	Mick Schade	2	1	1911
1911	Johnny MacGregor	4	0	1911
1911	Joe Price	7	2	1911
1911	Matt Incigneri	1	1	1911
1911	Artie Harrison	1	0	1911
1911	Norm Brooker	3	0	1911
1911	Bertie Wollacott	3	3	1911
1911	Jerry Hogan	4	4	1911–1912
1912	Ted Keggin	59	87	1912–1914, 1917
1912	Alan O'Donoghue	9	7	1912
1912	Charlie Wells	5	5	1912
1912	Bert Allen	2	3	1912
1912	Charlie Bennie	8	5	1912
1912	Dick Price	5	0	1912
1912	Ben Sheppard	1	1	1912
1912	Arthur Danks	48	2	1912–1915
1912	Vin Kenney	2	0	1912
1912	Andy Pattison	1	0	1912
1912	Percy Smith	4	1	1912
1912	Percy Ellingsen	6	5	1912
1912	Bill Lynch	1	0	1912
1912	Leo Rush	2	2	1912
1912	Alex Salvado	1	2	1912
1912	Clarrie Hall	150	169	1912–1922, 1924
1912	Dave Moffatt	95	25	1912–1917, 1919–1920
1912	Percy Sheehan	4	0	1912
1912	Harry Walker	9	5	1912–1913
1913	Arthur Heath	2	1	1913
1913	Fred Morgan	31	2	1913–1915
1913	Ned Richardson	26	4	1913–1915
1913	Lou Wilson	4	0	1913, 1915
1913	Percy Martyn	21	50	1913–1915
1913	Charlie Ricketts	16	11	1913–1914
1913	Cliff Hutton	6	1	1913
1913	Jack Arbrew	10	0	1913–1914
1913	Len Phillips	4	2	1913
1913	Jack Bristow	5	0	1913
1913	Jim Fitzpatrick	7	0	1913
1913	Frank Twomey	3	1	1913–1914
1913	Les Lee	2	0	1913
1914	Bob McKendry	6	1	1914
1914	George McLear	3	0	1914
1914	Bill Nolan	30	4	1914–1915
1914	Artie Bettles	73	0	1914–1920
1914	Bill Thomas	62	3	1914–1916, 1918–1919
1914	Frank Hughes	87	51	1914–1915, 1919–1923
1914	Bill Thorpe	2	2	1914
1914	Len Gibb	1	0	1914
1914	Wal Rogers	1	0	1914
1914	Dave Smith	1	3	1914
1914	Jack Cronk	23	11	1914–1917
1914	Reg Hede	85	1	1914–1921
1914	George Driscoll	2	0	1914
1914	Allan Granger	11	11	1914–1915
1914	George Bayliss	89	217	1914, 1916–1923
1914	Harry Maynard	2	0	1914
1915	Jim McDonald	10	12	1915
1915	Bill Amery	4	0	1915
1915	Herb Matthews	3	0	1915
1915	Jack Sheehan	14	0	1915, 1917
1915	Ray Stewart	31	0	1915–1918
1915	Bill Marshall	3	0	1915
1915	Billy Briscoe	26	6	1915–1918
1915	Harry Alessio	38	34	1915–1919
1915	Leo Burke	36	0	1915–1919
1915	Howard Richardson	19	14	1915–1917
1915	Harry Stokesberry	1	0	1915
1915	Horrie Weeks	2	3	1915
1915	Frank Harley	114	66	1915–1917, 1919–1925
1915	Bert Barnes	3	4	1915–1916
1916	Ted Derrick	9	6	1916
1916	Jimmy Shand	40	3	1916–1919
1916	Roy Taylor	33	13	1916–1918
1916	Alec Eason	12	8	1916
1916	Percy Martini	10	22	1916
1916	Edmund Hood	10	4	1916–1919
1916	Basil Kiernan	2	0	1916
1916	Will Collopy	1	0	1916
1916	Harry Marsham	7	4	1916
1916	Jim Kearney	7	0	1916
1917	Andy Ericksen	1	0	1917
1917	Victor Heath	3	0	1917
1917	Max Hislop	128	4	1917–1924, 1927
1917	Billy Rudd	21	8	1917–1918
1917	Charlie Fehring	21	24	1917–1919
1917	Denis Gleeson	22	0	1917–1918
1917	Donald Don	158	157	1917–1928
1917	Dick Godfrey	4	0	1917
1917	Ted Davey	4	1	1917
1917	Bob Weatherill	72	44	1917–1923
1917	Bill Albress	8	6	1917–1918
1917	Wally Bowtell	1	1	1917
1917	Arthur Fox	5	1	1917–1918
1917	Reefton Spicer	3	1	1917–1918
1917	Jimmy Smith	132	40	1917–1926
1918	Pat Dooley	15	1	1918–1919
1918	Leo McCulloch	3	1	1918
1918	Frank Rigaldi	2	1	1918
1918	Hugh Mulcahy	1	0	1918
1918	Claude Fell	1	0	1918
1918	Ted Fisher	4	1	1918
1918	Jim Burchill	3	5	1918
1919	Artie Fewster	2	0	1919
1919	George Threlfall	8	4	1919, 1923–1924
1919	George Weatherill	53	5	1919–1923
1919	Robert Carew	45	6	1919–1922
1919	Stan Morris	52	4	1919–1922
1919	Paddy Abbott	18	1	1919–1920
1919	Arthur Fehring	2	0	1919
1919	Ted Aumann	7	0	1919
1919	Wilfred Stott	9	0	1919–1920
1919	Harry Weatherill	6	0	1919
1919	Frank Huggard	33	2	1919–1920, 1922–1925
1919	George Parkinson	12	0	1919–1921

=== 1920s ===
Debut Year	Player	Games	Goals	Years at Club
1920	Norm McIntosh	78	3	1920–1924
1920	Dan Minogue	94	38	1920–1925
1920	Gerald Rush	15	16	1920
1920	Charlie Tuck	1	0	1920
1920	Jim Karthaus	26	2	1920–1924
1920	Ernie Taylor	58	2	1920–1926
1920	George Ogilvie	2	0	1920
1920	Billy James	1	1	1920
1921	Norm Turnbull	34	25	1921–1923
1921	Reg Whitehead	2	2	1921
1921	Hugh Moffatt	9	2	1921–1922
1921	Mel Morris	89	148	1921–1926
1921	Cyril Nott	5	1	1921–1922
1921	Eddie Hanley	1	0	1921
1921	George O'Hehir	1	0	1921
1921	Keith Osmond	12	0	1921, 1923–1924
1921	Charles Smith	3	0	1921–1922
1922	George Rudolph	80	61	1922, 1924–1928
1922	Matt Connors	6	3	1922–1923
1922	Doug Hayes	82	62	1922–1928
1922	Arthur Birtles	5	5	1922
1922	Angus MacIsaac	59	20	1922–1924, 1926–1927
1922	Rob Brady	2	0	1922–1923
1922	Dave Lynch	20	77	1922–1923, 1926–1927, 1929
1922	Rupert Gibb	4	0	1922
1922	Billy Wright	3	0	1922–1923
1922	George Clark	1	0	1922
1922	Ray Ross	1	1	1922
1922	Bob Stewart	1	0	1922
1923	Herbie Brunning	2	0	1923–1924
1923	Dave Griffiths	10	7	1923
1923	Gordon Hislop	22	0	1923–1924
1923	Loyal Oakley	2	0	1923
1923	George Ross	1	0	1923
1923	Jim Spain	40	2	1923–1925, 1927
1923	Cedric MacLeod	2	0	1923
1923	Gus Petzke	2	0	1923
1923	Kevin Rush	7	4	1923–1924
1923	Stan Wootton	6	1	1923
1923	Don Fraser, Sr.	18	25	1923–1925
1923	Harry Pollock	16	3	1923–1924, 1926
1923	Bob McCaskill	36	0	1923–1925
1923	Joe Harrison	19	1	1923–1925
1923	John McCormick	1	0	1923
1923	Leo Dobrigh	2	0	1923
1923	Arthur Kight	1	0	1923
1924	Ted Bourke	32	15	1924–1926
1924	Basil Smith	10	6	1924
1924	Eric Chalmers	6	4	1924
1924	Joe Rowe	2	1	1924
1924	Gerry Beare	2	0	1924
1924	Horrie Bannister	1	0	1924
1924	Jack Gale	3	0	1924
1924	Reuben Reid	13	1	1924–1926
1924	Jim Maxfield	10	2	1924–1925
1924	George Valentine	24	4	1924–1926
1924	Keith Millar	37	38	1924–1927, 1930
1924	Jack Barnett	13	11	1924–1926
1924	Ralph Empey	49	29	1924–1925, 1928–1930
1925	Allan Geddes	182	14	1925–1935
1925	Basil McCormack	199	1	1925–1936
1925	Thomas O'Halloran	142	120	1925–1934
1925	George Robinson	38	16	1925–1927
1925	Sam Barrett	3	1	1925
1925	Stan Yates	5	0	1925
1925	Allan Bouch	1	0	1925
1925	Jack Huggard	28	43	1925–1927
1925	Fred Wood	3	0	1925
1925	Charlie Whitely	1	0	1925
1925	John Culhane	1	0	1925
1925	Vern Moore	4	1	1925
1925	Percy Bentley	263	275	1925–1940
1925	Frank Horne	2	0	1925
1925	Ray Baxter	2	3	1925
1925	Bennie Lunn	28	0	1925–1926, 1928–1929
1925	Bob O'Neill	19	4	1925, 1927–1928
1925	Joe Plant	1	0	1925
1926	Bert Boromeo	14	8	1926
1926	Les Gallagher	62	27	1926–1929
1926	Jack James	16	19	1926
1926	Cyril Lilburne	74	20	1926–1929
1926	Roy Parkin	1	0	1926
1926	George Waterhouse	7	2	1926
1926	Harry Weidner	96	128	1926–1932
1926	Frank O'Brien	23	5	1926–1928
1926	Don Harris	64	5	1926–1930
1926	Alby Anderson	4	0	1926
1926	Joe Corfield	5	0	1926
1926	Cyril Burke	2	2	1926
1926	Bill Finlayson	2	0	1926
1926	Jack Titus	294	970	1926–1943
1926	Charlie Anderson	3	0	1926
1926	Sam Jamison	5	0	1926–1929
1927	Jack Baggott	128	140	1927–1935
1927	Jack Fincher	69	54	1927–1930
1927	Frank Kight	3	1	1927–1928
1927	Bill Ford	1	1	1927
1927	Joe Murdoch	180	6	1927–1936
1927	Cyril Powell	6	0	1927
1927	Les Stainsby	2	2	1927
1927	Carl Watson	44	3	1927–1931
1927	Jack McCormack	24	74	1927–1929
1928	Jack Bisset	38	9	1928, 1931
1928	Bill Benton	56	41	1928–1932
1928	Roy Outram	4	2	1928
1928	Fred Goding	9	9	1928
1928	Stan Judkins	133	5	1928–1936
1928	Charlie Street	13	2	1928, 1930–1931
1928	Reg Baker	10	7	1928
1928	Bert Foster	133	65	1928–1936
1928	Allan Oakley	39	24	1928–1931
1929	Maurie Sheahan	121	3	1929–1936
1929	Fred Heifner	100	19	1929–1935
1929	Tom Dunne	21	1	1929–1931
1929	Stan Harris	4	4	1929
1929	Stan Ryan	14	8	1929
1929	Bob Wilson	1	0	1929
1929	Maurie Hunter	81	159	1929–1933

=== 1930s ===
Debut Year	Player	Games	Goals	Years at Club
1930	Hope Collins	1	1	1930
1930	Kevin O'Neill	209	12	1930–1941
1930	Bill Griffith	1	0	1930
1930	Ray Martin	159	135	1930, 1932–1940
1930	Eric Zschech	102	16	1930–1935
1930	Martin Bolger	185	2	1930–1939
1930	Ted Cusack	2	0	1930
1930	Stan Ogden	1	0	1930
1931	Frank Ford	16	11	1931
1931	Doug Strang	64	180	1931–1935
1931	Gordon Strang	116	108	1931–1936, 1938
1931	Jack Dyer	312	443	1931–1949
1931	Jack Twyford	37	14	1931–1933
1931	Tom Cunningham	2	2	1931
1931	Wally Gray	3	0	1931–1932
1932	Charlie Kolb	3	1	1932
1932	Horrie Stanway	1	0	1932
1932	Ted Collinson	4	1	1932
1932	Jack Anderson	9	2	1932–1933
1932	Jack McConchie	16	9	1932–1934
1932	Sid Dockendorff	13	5	1932–1933
1933	Horrie Farmer	8	14	1933
1933	Jack Stenhouse	19	0	1933–1934
1933	Richie Saunders	8	0	1933–1934
1933	Bob Gislingham	1	1	1933
1934	Dave Baxter	47	53	1934–1936
1934	Danny Guinane	102	1	1934–1939, 1942–1943
1934	Dick Harris	196	548	1934–1944
1934	Bill Garvie	9	0	1934–1935
1934	Clarrie Jordon	15	6	1934–1936
1934	Horace Edmonds	30	20	1934–1935
1934	Jack Symons	111	71	1934–1944
1934	Dick Chirgwin	64	4	1934–1939
1935	Pat Davey	10	4	1935–1936, 1942
1935	Jack Cotter	105	0	1935–1941
1935	Bill Hearn	6	5	1935
1935	Bill Ripper	4	0	1935
1935	Ray Scriven	34	2	1935–1938
1935	George Smeaton	149	36	1935–1942, 1944–1946
1936	Ian Hull	107	42	1936–1942, 1945
1936	Fred Crapper	2	0	1936
1936	Cyril O'Brien	9	0	1936
1936	Billy Wells	23	2	1936–1937
1936	Bill Wisdom	2	0	1936
1936	Gerry Hayes	16	3	1936–1937
1936	Norm Dickson	28	25	1936–1939
1936	Geoff Grant	21	3	1936–1938
1936	Les Patton	4	3	1936–1937
1937	Reg Henderson	28	8	1937–1938
1937	Lou Sleeth	20	22	1937–1938
1937	Fred Wilson	7	1	1937
1937	Allan Maple	3	3	1937
1937	Frank Uwins	1	1	1937
1937	Jack Crane	102	25	1937–1942
1937	Jack Uwins	6	0	1937
1937	George Bates	26	4	1937–1939
1937	Alby Broman	7	0	1937–1939
1937	Maurie O'Connell	34	41	1937, 1939–1941
1938	Billy Jenkins	3	0	1938
1938	Jim MacBeth	4	0	1938
1938	Alan McCrory	5	2	1938
1938	Stan Brett	9	5	1938
1938	Bert Edwards	122	22	1938–1945
1938	Harry Smith	19	2	1938–1939
1938	Charlie Priestley	109	12	1938–1947
1938	Jack Burgmann	1	0	1938
1938	Claude Cummings	1	0	1938
1939	Len Ablett	70	5	1939–1943
1939	Jack Scott	86	43	1939–1945
1939	Laird Smith	66	73	1939–1941, 1945
1939	Jack Currie	6	0	1939
1939	Alan McDonald	49	8	1939–1941, 1943
1939	Bob Bawden	107	107	1939–1945

=== 1940s ===
Debut Year	Player	Games	Goals	Years at Club
1940	Bill Cosgrove	3	0	1940
1940	Ray Steele	42	1	1940–1943
1940	Joe Reilly	17	0	1940–1942
1940	Leo Merrett	170	53	1940–1949
1940	Bernie Waldron	83	22	1940–1945
1940	Roy Quinn	25	25	1940–1941, 1943–1944
1940	Bill Perkins	148	0	1940–1949
1940	Jack Quinn	19	14	1940–1941
1940	Alby Hodges	1	0	1940
1941	Bill White	8	1	1941
1941	Jack Sullivan	31	9	1941–1943, 1946
1941	Keith Brooks	7	0	1941
1941	Brian Randall	54	36	1941–1945
1941	Leo Maguire	96	4	1941–1948
1941	Phil Nagle	15	12	1941, 1946
1941	Gerald Tanner	1	0	1941
1942	Kevin Crohan	1	0	1942
1942	Harry Dwan	1	0	1942
1942	Wally Russell	33	11	1942–1943, 1945–1948
1942	Bob Walliker	1	0	1942
1942	Andy Brannan	19	29	1942–1943
1942	Eddie Ford	4	0	1942–1943
1942	Max Oppy	185	29	1942–1954
1942	Gordon Styles	16	1	1942–1943, 1945
1942	Sid Searl	3	0	1942
1942	Kevin Colls	8	0	1942, 1946–1947
1942	Bill Morris	140	98	1942, 1944–1951
1942	Joe Hinson	8	0	1942, 1944
1942	Fred Burge	118	105	1942–1950
1942	Des Martin	5	5	1942
1942	Bob Hay	2	1	1942
1943	Ron Durham	59	0	1943–1944, 1946–1948
1943	Frank Howard	8	2	1943, 1948
1943	Arthur Barr-Kemp	34	4	1943–1946
1943	Bob McIlveen	6	0	1943
1943	Fred Stammers	1	0	1943
1943	Noel Doherty	8	3	1943, 1945
1943	Kevin Curran	16	28	1943–1945
1943	Arthur Mooney	66	94	1943–1948
1943	Alan Nutter	1	0	1943
1943	Laurie Cahill	7	4	1943
1943	Jack Giles	1	0	1943
1943	Jack Broadstock	33	23	1943–1946
1943	Ray Hunt	6	2	1943
1943	Frank Bourke	16	48	1943, 1946–1947
1944	Fred Cook	81	11	1944–1949
1944	Keith Cook	26	1	1944–1946
1944	Laurie Taylor	20	48	1944, 1947
1944	Ray Bower	13	8	1944–1945
1944	Bill Wilson	185	225	1944–1954
1944	Frank Hughes Jr.	3	0	1944
1944	Kevin Deagan	5	3	1944, 1946
1944	Percy Bice	6	0	1944
1944	Allen Lewis	3	0	1944
1944	Bob Wiggins	68	2	1944–1951
1944	Les Jones	59	23	1944, 1946–1949
1945	Mopsy Fraser	124	125	1945–1952
1945	Ray Potter	2	3	1945, 1947
1945	Sel Murray	13	50	1945–1946
1945	Stuart Cartwright	7	0	1945
1945	Jack Turner	13	0	1945–1947
1945	Don Benson	3	0	1945
1945	Des Negri	2	1	1945
1945	Noel Ross	35	38	1945–1947, 1949
1945	Kevin Barnewall	4	0	1945
1945	Don Balfour	8	1	1945–1946
1946	Jack Eames	14	1	1946
1946	Bill Roach	1	0	1946
1946	Des Rowe	175	24	1946–1957
1946	Keith Rae	2	1	1946
1946	Ray Stokes	93	23	1946–1951
1946	Des Calverley	18	1	1946–1947
1946	Ray Poulter	170	351	1946–1956
1946	Ken Albiston	58	76	1946–1951
1946	George Nelson	2	0	1946
1946	Roy Wright	195	127	1946–1959
1946	Ron Evans	26	36	1946–1949
1947	Vic Hill	3	1	1947
1947	Alby Pannam	2	6	1947
1947	Jack Watson	18	8	1947–1949
1947	Peter Sherman	2	0	1947
1947	Dan Knott	4	0	1947
1947	Bert James	3	0	1947
1947	Wally Cook	4	0	1947
1947	Ken Roberts	58	0	1947–1951
1947	Pat Phillips	15	3	1947–1948
1947	Max Evans	7	4	1947–1948
1947	Max Currie	34	17	1947–1951
1947	Jack Roberts	26	0	1947–1950
1948	Geoff Spring	147	63	1948–1957
1948	Stan Tomlins	12	23	1948
1948	Ken Sier	38	13	1948–1950
1948	Havel Rowe	124	43	1948–1957
1948	Jervis Stokes	33	32	1948–1950
1948	Clive Watson	4	1	1948
1948	Bill Williams	9	3	1948–1949
1949	Jack O'Rourke	44	134	1949–1953
1949	Allan Cooke	116	54	1949–1958
1949	Kevin Webb	7	0	1949
1949	Ron Irvine	14	0	1949–1951
1949	Wally Seitz	1	0	1949
1949	Kevin Dillon	88	4	1949–1955
1949	Stan Wilson	6	2	1949
1949	John Nix	95	18	1949–1956
1949	Max Hood	1	0	1949
1949	Tom Allen	22	8	1949–1952
1949	Leo Clarke	3	0	1949

=== 1950s ===
Debut Year	Player	Games	Goals	Years at Club
1950	Col Austen	51	1	1950–1952
1950	Ray Ednie	23	13	1950, 1952–1953
1950	Ray Horwood	27	26	1950–1952
1950	Brian Boland	50	6	1950–1954
1950	Les Flintoff	17	4	1950–1952
1950	Gerry Sier	7	0	1950
1950	Frank Drum	2	0	1950
1950	Jack Atkinson	3	5	1950
1950	Brian Turner	20	8	1950–1952
1951	Fred Clarke	21	0	1951–1953
1951	Len Gardner	5	0	1951
1951	John Ritchie	40	2	1951–1955
1951	Basil O'Rourke	4	0	1951
1951	Peter Schofield	16	25	1951–1953
1951	Ron Reiffel	6	0	1951–1952
1951	Frank Ryan	62	4	1951–1957
1951	Bob Gleeson	1	1	1951
1952	Barrie Brown	2	0	1952
1952	Rex Geard	11	0	1952–1953
1952	Kevin Hogan	15	10	1952–1953
1952	Pat Audas	14	7	1952–1954
1952	Albert Western	4	3	1952
1952	Allan Cations	104	8	1952–1957, 1959
1952	Jim Brennan	2	0	1952
1952	Graham Cox	32	15	1952–1956
1952	Kevin Betson	42	2	1952–1955
1952	John Currie	3	1	1952
1952	Gavin Hoare	8	3	1952–1953
1952	Gerald Collins	12	6	1952–1953
1952	Ray Gibb	6	1	1952–1953
1952	Stan Morcom	58	17	1952–1958
1953	Ron Branton	170	171	1953–1962
1953	Kevin Coppock	2	0	1953
1953	Bill Green	10	0	1953–1954
1953	Brian Davie	89	36	1953–1959
1953	Gerry Walsh	1	0	1953
1953	Kevin Gleeson	1	0	1953
1953	Tom Hafey	67	10	1953–1958
1953	Jeff Patterson	14	4	1953–1954
1953	Stan Vandersluys	3	0	1953
1953	Frank Slater	19	0	1953–1955
1953	Lloyd Brewer	3	1	1953
1953	Frank Dunin	69	30	1953, 1955–1959
1953	Reg Fisher	4	2	1953
1953	Reg Hall	26	6	1953–1955
1954	Jim Deane	33	17	1954–1955
1954	Don Hart	5	2	1954
1954	Laurie Sharp	41	14	1954–1957
1954	Jim Walton	20	15	1954–1955
1954	Cliff Eade	1	0	1954
1954	Kevin Bradley	6	10	1954
1954	Herb Sawatzky	7	0	1954–1955
1954	Bob Dummett	77	199	1954–1961
1954	Ken McGown	13	0	1954–1956
1954	Lance Cox	7	0	1954–1955
1955	Neil Davies	2	1	1955
1955	Ron McDonald	92	84	1955–1960
1955	John Claxton	15	18	1955–1956
1955	John Gorwell	9	0	1955
1955	John Robson	6	4	1955
1955	Ted Langridge	94	149	1955–1962
1955	Ray Allsopp	54	69	1955–1959
1955	John Jenkins	34	34	1955–1959
1955	Peter Morris	89	103	1955–1960
1955	Ray Bloodworth	2	0	1955–1956
1955	Charlie Flannagan	26	0	1955–1958
1956	Bill Carrick	5	5	1956
1956	Tom Simpson	126	6	1956–1963
1956	Bill Evely	11	5	1956, 1958
1956	Col Saddington	102	10	1956–1962
1956	Ken Ward	43	0	1956–1959
1956	Les Amery	4	2	1956
1956	Gordon Andrews	1	0	1956
1956	Martin Davis	4	1	1956
1956	Vic Naismith	31	7	1956–1958
1956	Ray McGaw	12	0	1956–1958
1956	Frank Munro	13	0	1956–1957
1957	Bill Clements	14	2	1957–1959
1957	Neville Crowe	150	84	1957–1967
1957	Len Mitchell	6	1	1957
1957	Brian Pilcher	9	2	1957–1958
1957	Graeme McCartney	1	0	1957
1957	Norman Walker	1	0	1957
1957	Gordon Peake	6	0	1957–1958
1957	Dave Cuzens	69	3	1957–1961
1957	James Williams	6	1	1957–1958
1957	Roger Dean	245	204	1957–1973
1958	Bob Clifford	12	1	1958
1958	Bill McKenzie	4	0	1958
1958	Fred Swift	146	41	1958–1967
1958	Jim Meehan	5	2	1958
1958	Doug Clarke	8	7	1958–1959
1958	Tista De Lorenzo	10	0	1958
1958	Doug Reynolds	15	2	1958–1959
1958	Colin Holt	21	2	1958–1959
1958	Ian Gardner	10	6	1958–1959
1958	Paddy Guinane	146	216	1958–1968
1958	Larry Rowe	20	6	1958–1961
1959	John D'Arcy	5	1	1959
1959	Graham Jacobs	50	50	1959–1963
1959	Alan Richardson	103	30	1959–1969
1959	Peter Loughran	50	6	1959–1963
1959	Graeme Gahan	89	7	1959–1966
1959	Barry Cameron	96	21	1959–1966
1959	Dick Grimmond	102	6	1959–1964
1959	John Thompson	65	0	1959–1963
1959	John Wilson	6	2	1959
1959	Alan Hayes	23	10	1959–1962
1959	Bob Rees	6	1	1959
1959	Michael Patterson	152	73	1959–1969
1959	Don Williams	7	0	1959–1960
1959	Laurie O'Toole	13	8	1959–1960
1959	Johnny Ryan	2	0	1959
1959	Noel Anderson	12	0	1959–1960
1959	Bernie Anderson	3	2	1959–1960
1959	Bill Edwards	2	1	1959

=== 1960s ===
Debut Year	Player	Games	Goals	Years at Club
1960	Murray Gainger	3	0	1960
1960	Graeme Wilkinson	29	32	1960–1961
1960	Dennis Smith	13	1	1960–1961
1960	Fred Mundy	6	1	1960
1960	Brian Morrison	6	0	1960
1960	Renato Ricci	2	0	1960
1960	Jack Dyer, Jr.	3	0	1960
1960	Tony Murphy	3	1	1960
1960	Bruce Blainey	1	0	1960
1961	Ron Johnson	19	16	1961–1962
1961	Kevin Callander	7	1	1961–1962
1961	Basil Moloney	21	3	1961–1963
1961	John Robertson	43	1	1961–1965
1961	Ron Serich	28	36	1961–1963
1961	Dick Burrows	5	0	1961
1961	Gary Williamson	42	24	1961–1964
1961	Kevin Fitzgerald	1	0	1961
1961	Robert Hickman	18	1	1961–1964
1961	Ian Slockwitch	2	0	1961
1961	Edo Benetti	9	7	1961–1962
1961	Bob Beaven	5	0	1961
1961	Ron O'Brien	1	0	1961
1961	Bob Lockhart	13	7	1961–1962
1961	Bill Barrot	120	91	1961–1970
1961	John Richmond	18	16	1961–1964
1962	Ian Hayden	30	42	1962–1964
1962	Wally Hillis	3	0	1962
1962	Brian McMillan	22	6	1962–1964
1962	Bruce Smith	11	10	1962, 1964
1962	Lance Behan	10	0	1962–1963
1962	Len Park	2	0	1962
1962	Graeme Ellis	1	0	1962
1962	Roy Selleck	24	2	1962–1964
1962	John Sheahan	17	11	1962, 1965–1966
1962	Ron Dean	2	1	1962
1963	Peter Hogan	40	57	1963–1966
1963	John Northey	118	192	1963–1970
1963	Rodney Evans	11	0	1963–1964
1963	Billy Brown	130	124	1963–1971
1963	Tom Garland	11	1	1963–1964
1963	Brian Lienert	2	0	1963–1964
1963	Gary Arnold	13	7	1963–1964
1963	Ross Warner	49	45	1963–1967
1963	Bob Brownhill	4	0	1963
1963	John Caulfield	9	0	1963
1963	Owen Madigan	40	1	1963–1966
1963	Jeff Lawson	10	7	1963–1964
1964	Neil Busse	37	9	1964–1967
1964	Trevor Gowers	24	5	1964–1966
1964	John Perry	26	1	1964–1969
1964	Kevin Smith	47	3	1964–1966
1964	Tony Jewell	80	16	1964–1970
1964	Mike Hammond	31	10	1964–1966
1964	Graham Bamford	1	1	1964
1964	Terry Morrissey	5	2	1964
1964	Rodger Richardson	1	0	1964
1964	Don Davenport	56	38	1964–1967, 1969, 1971
1964	Norm Madigan	2	0	1964
1964	Frank Dimattina	42	44	1964–1968
1964	Ron Lienert	2	0	1964
1964	Vin Crowe	1	1	1964
1964	Maurie Deery	5	1	1964–1965
1964	Colin Dobson	1	0	1964
1965	Barry Richardson	125	134	1965–1974
1965	Geoff Strang	88	0	1965–1971
1965	Wilf Dickeson	23	0	1965–1966
1965	Mike Perry	53	6	1965–1969
1965	Kevin Bartlett	403	778	1965–1983
1965	John Chivers	2	0	1965
1965	Mick Erwin	33	37	1965–1968
1965	Graham Burgin	60	0	1965–1971
1965	Bill Walford	8	1	1965–1966
1965	John Ronaldson	59	33	1965–1970
1965	Barry Teague	3	1	1965–1967
1966	Dick Clay	213	80	1966–1976
1966	Eric Moore	80	94	1966–1972
1966	Ray Orchard	8	2	1966–1968
1966	Blair Campbell	8	12	1966, 1968
1966	Mike Green	146	83	1966–1971, 1973–1975
1967	Royce Hart	187	369	1967–1977
1967	Kevin Shinners	23	0	1967–1968
1967	Kevin Sheedy	251	91	1967–1979
1967	Francis Bourke	300	71	1967–1981
1967	Michael Bowden	59	20	1967–1971
1967	Graeme Bond	115	61	1967–1973, 1975–1977
1967	David Jacks	1	0	1967
1968	Darryl Beale	10	0	1968
1968	Wayne Walsh	88	30	1968, 1972–1975, 1977–1978
1968	Pat Curran	1	0	1968
1968	Rex Hunt	113	121	1968–1974
1968	Ted Murphy	17	1	1968–1969
1968	George McInnes	16	6	1968–1970
1968	Keith Smythe	15	8	1968–1970
1968	Des McKenzie	16	0	1968–1969
1968	Russell Tully	1	0	1968
1968	Derek Peardon	20	1	1968–1971
1969	Ray Ball	12	0	1969–1970
1969	Ian Owen	33	0	1969–1972
1969	Ron Thomas	11	0	1969–1970
1969	Brian Shinners	2	0	1969
1969	John Ferguson	7	0	1969
1969	Wayne Judd	7	9	1969
1969	Brenton Miels	7	1	1969–1970
1969	Graham Robbins	13	9	1969–1971
1969	Colin Beard	33	0	1969–1971
1969	Anthony Smith	4	1	1969, 1972

=== 1970s ===
Debut Year	Player	Games	Goals	Years at Club
1970	Peter Cloke	28	4	1970–1973
1970	Ray Boyanich	66	44	1970–1972, 1976
1970	Paul Morrison	5	2	1970
1970	Grant Oppy	1	0	1970
1970	Eric Leech	79	0	1970–1979
1970	Trevor Wilson	2	2	1970
1970	Greg Hollick	38	19	1970–1972
1970	Lloyd French	3	2	1970–1971
1970	Neil Balme	159	229	1970–1979
1970	Ian Craig	5	0	1970–1971
1971	Brian Roberts	78	34	1971–1975
1971	Ian Stewart	78	55	1971–1975
1971	Bill Beckwith	10	8	1971–1972
1971	Malcolm Greenslade	2	7	1971
1971	Mick Nunan	1	3	1971
1971	Frank Kelly	2	1	1971
1971	Bruce Tschirpig	10	12	1971, 1976
1971	Laurie Fowler	49	7	1971–1974
1971	Daryl Cumming	88	64	1971–1976
1971	Kevin Morris	110	71	1971–1976
1971	Craig McKellar	96	25	1971–1975
1971	Grant Allford	30	1	1971–1973
1971	Ian Miles	4	0	1971–1972
1971	Bill Gehling	1	0	1971
1972	Ricky McLean	39	103	1972–1974, 1976
1972	Marty McMillan	26	13	1972–1974
1972	Paul Sproule	86	93	1972–1975
1972	Bill Nalder	14	5	1972–1973
1972	Bryan Wood	209	85	1972–1982
1972	Mervyn Keane	238	36	1972–1984
1972	Tony Hunt	1	0	1972
1972	Steve Hywood	13	0	1972
1972	Graham Gaunt	19	8	1972, 1976–1977
1973	Robbie McGhie	81	0	1973–1978
1973	Robert Lamb	58	120	1973–1978
1973	Stephen Rae	20	11	1973–1974
1973	Glynn Hewitt	15	15	1973–1974
1973	Murray Thompson	14	3	1973, 1976
1973	Noel Carter	50	55	1973–1977
1973	Graham Teasdale	6	16	1973
1973	Francis Jackson	6	0	1973–1974
1973	Wes Barrot	3	0	1973–1974
1974	Mal Brown	14	25	1974
1974	David Cloke	219	272	1974–1982, 1990–1991
1974	Stephen Parsons	5	1	1974
1974	Bill Nettlefold	15	6	1974–1975
1974	Gareth Andrews	31	1	1974–1975
1974	Gerald Betts	10	0	1974–1975
1974	Cameron Clayton	57	20	1974–1977
1974	Steven Taubert	15	14	1974–1976
1974	David Thorpe	27	24	1974–1976
1975	Bruce Monteath	118	198	1975–1980
1975	Neville Roberts	48	81	1975–1977
1975	John Pitura	40	24	1975–1977
1975	Allan Edwards	66	84	1975–1979
1975	Noel Jenkinson	57	0	1975–1979
1976	Bob Heard	54	45	1976–1979
1976	Ken Stonehouse	12	4	1976, 1978
1976	Emmett Dunne	115	56	1976–1983
1976	Don Mattson	7	0	1976
1976	Geoff Raines	134	55	1976–1982
1976	Graeme Robertson	51	1	1976–1977, 1979, 1981
1976	Alan Lynch	2	1	1976
1976	Jim Jess	223	175	1976–1988
1976	Mick Malthouse	121	10	1976–1983
1976	Ian Scrimshaw	40	26	1976–1981
1976	Ian Borchard	5	2	1976, 1978
1976	David Henry	1	0	1976
1977	Jon Hummel	9	7	1977–1978
1977	Glenn Dickson	11	10	1977–1978
1977	David Miller	5	7	1977
1977	Alan Noonan	10	14	1977
1977	Michael Roach	200	607	1977–1989
1977	Peter Laughlin	25	46	1977–1980
1977	Greg Naylor	18	4	1977–1980
1977	Daryl Freame	17	5	1977–1981
1977	Mark Lee	233	94	1977–1991
1977	Bruce Tempany	87	33	1977–1983
1978	John Einsiedel	11	1	1978
1978	Greg Strachan	154	8	1978–1987
1978	Dale Weightman	274	344	1978–1993
1978	Paul Feltham	7	8	1978
1978	Barry Grinter	6	0	1978
1978	Gary Parkes	7	6	1978–1979
1978	Stephen Roach	2	0	1978
1978	Garry Davidson	10	9	1978
1978	Phillip Bottams	26	4	1978–1981
1978	Geoff McMillan	11	5	1978–1979
1978	Jeff Berry	10	0	1978–1979
1978	Colin Waterson	13	9	1978, 1980–1981
1979	Stephen Mount	31	9	1979–1982
1979	Robert Wiley	95	127	1979–1983
1979	Frank Bain	2	0	1979
1979	Kim Kershaw	5	0	1979–1980
1979	Barry Rowlings	152	117	1979–1986
1979	Peter Williams	7	1	1979
1979	Shane Williams	27	14	1979–1983
1979	Barrie Trotter	2	0	1979
1979	Craig Considine	7	1	1979
1979	Rod Oborne	5	7	1979–1981
1979	Graeme Landy	120	38	1979–1986

=== 1980s ===
Debut Year	Player	Games	Goals	Years at Club
1980	Matthew Wall	60	23	1980–1985
1980	Paul Sarah	37	51	1980–1983
1980	Terry Smith	56	15	1980–1982, 1986
1980	Denis Collins	17	2	1980
1980	Peter Welsh	46	45	1980–1984
1980	Ian Baker	3	0	1980
1980	Michael Nugent	16	2	1980–1981
1980	Brian Taylor	43	156	1980–1984
1981	Robert Semmens	5	0	1981
1981	Daryl Vernon	9	3	1981, 1985
1981	Alan Martello	32	3	1981–1983
1981	Geoff Martin	6	3	1981, 1983
1982	Phil Egan	125	117	1982–1990
1982	Noel Mugavin	2	3	1982
1982	Maurice Rioli	118	80	1982–1987
1982	Darryl Sutton	6	0	1982–1983
1982	Wayne Shand	12	1	1982–1984
1982	Ross Brewer	6	8	1982–1983
1982	Andy Preston	18	6	1982–1983
1982	Stephen Pirrie	11	0	1982, 1984
1982	Ian Sartori	18	7	1982–1983, 1985
1983	Tim Gepp	57	3	1983–1985
1983	David Palm	104	38	1983–1988
1983	Craig Balme	3	0	1983
1983	Michael Rolfe	10	4	1983
1983	Brian Winton	10	3	1983
1983	Richard Murrie	8	0	1983
1983	Neil Peart	40	9	1983–1984, 1986–1987
1983	Geoff Ablett	16	12	1983–1984
1983	Dan Foley	13	9	1983–1985
1983	Wally Lovett	13	6	1983–1984
1983	Greg Conlan	6	3	1983–1984
1983	Michael Lockman	4	0	1983, 1986
1983	Bradley Ross	1	0	1983
1984	Peter Francis	52	22	1984–1986
1984	Michael Pickering	136	160	1984–1991
1984	Phil Walsh	40	14	1984–1986
1984	John Annear	65	43	1984–1986
1984	Jeff Dunne	1	0	1984
1984	Craig Stewart	35	3	1984–1986
1984	Trevor Poole	99	56	1984–1989
1984	Kevin Ablett	5	0	1984
1984	John Manton	59	38	1984–1989
1984	Robert Fuller	4	1	1984
1984	David Simpson	2	1	1984–1985
1984	Tim Barling	14	1	1984–1985
1985	Mark Eustice	62	26	1985–1988
1985	Trevor Larkins	4	4	1985
1985	Michael McKenna	22	10	1985
1985	Stephen James	77	78	1985–1990
1985	Noel Lovell	4	0	1985–1986
1985	Chris Burton	50	8	1985–1988
1985	Peter Czerkaski	46	6	1985–1990
1985	Richard Geary	18	10	1985–1986
1985	Tom Crebbin	7	3	1985
1985	Gavin Bayes	5	2	1985–1987
1985	Dean Notting	28	17	1985–1987
1986	Peter McCormack	4	0	1986
1986	Michael Roberts	12	4	1986
1986	Ron Thornton	8	6	1986
1986	Geoff MacIlwain	2	0	1986
1986	Craig Smith	72	23	1986–1987, 1989–1993
1986	Jeff Hogg	144	306	1986–1993
1986	Simon Clark	27	6	1986–1988
1986	Brendan Bower	92	19	1986–1991
1986	Des Ryan	56	29	1986–1992
1986	Darryl Cowie	7	1	1986–1987
1986	Allan McKellar	45	15	1986–1990
1986	Andrew Cross	1	0	1986
1986	Scott Sutcliffe	2	0	1986
1986	Gary Frangalas	17	2	1986–1989
1986	Paul Morrish	4	0	1986, 1989
1987	Michael Mitchell	81	103	1987–1991
1987	Michael Thomson	42	15	1987–1990
1987	Peter Wilson	54	39	1987–1989
1987	Michael Laffy	26	0	1987–1990
1987	Terry Wallace	11	7	1987
1987	Tony Pastore	1	0	1987
1987	Peter Burke	2	0	1987
1987	David Buttifant	2	0	1987
1987	Richard Nixon	37	3	1987–1990
1987	Darren Bower	3	2	1987
1987	Tony Free	133	46	1987–1996
1987	Andy Goodwin	56	9	1987–1991
1987	Renato Dintinosante	2	0	1987
1988	David Honybun	55	39	1988–1992
1988	Craig Lambert	123	53	1988–1993
1988	Trent Nichols	75	65	1988–1991, 1997–1998
1988	Justin Pickering	59	54	1988–1991
1988	Tim Powell	64	40	1988–1992
1988	Mark Summers	15	4	1988–1989
1988	Paul Barlow	4	0	1988
1988	Brian Leys	110	19	1988–1994
1988	Greg Hamilton	29	17	1988–1990, 1992
1988	Chris Pym	24	13	1988–1989
1988	Matthew Knights	279	141	1988–2002
1988	Wayne Peters	5	1	1988–1989
1989	Stuart Griffiths	17	14	1989, 1991–1992
1989	Barry Young	53	23	1989–1993
1989	Richard Lounder	4	5	1989
1989	Brett Mahony	2	0	1989
1989	Mark McLeod	3	0	1989
1989	Mark Stockdale	6	2	1989, 1991
1989	Cory Young	6	1	1989–1990

=== 1990s ===
Debut Year	Player	Games	Goals	Years at Club
1990	Sean Bowden	6	0	1990–1991
1990	Brendon Gale	244	209	1990–2001
1990	Chris Naish	143	212	1990–1997
1990	Stephen Ryan	43	39	1990–1993
1990	Anthony Banik	49	0	1990–1994
1990	Darren Keighran	2	0	1990
1990	Stuart Maxfield	89	65	1990–1995
1990	Matthew Francis	19	13	1990–1992, 1994
1990	Allister Scott	19	10	1990–1993
1990	Robert Walker	5	0	1990–1992
1991	Terry Keays	25	29	1991–1992
1991	Mark McQueen	34	14	1991–1994
1991	Jason Smith	1	0	1991
1991	Scott Turner	144	33	1991–1999
1991	Todd Menegola	19	13	1991–1993
1991	Mark Trewella	4	4	1991
1991	Wayne Campbell	297	172	1991–2005
1991	John Mrakov	8	0	1991
1991	Andrew Underwood	12	4	1991
1991	Nathan Bower	74	22	1991–1998
1991	Ty Esler	12	0	1991–1993
1992	Todd Breman	25	24	1992–1993
1992	Nick Daffy	165	181	1992–2001
1992	Stuart Edwards	46	52	1992, 1994–1996
1992	Brad Gwilliam	4	0	1992
1992	Stevan Jackson	21	30	1992–1993
1992	Bruce Lennon	28	7	1992–1993
1992	Steven O'Dwyer	5	0	1992
1992	Ian Herman	14	6	1992–1993
1992	Tim Livingstone	8	1	1992–1993
1993	Paul Bulluss	97	20	1993–1998
1993	Simon Eishold	5	0	1993
1993	Wayne Hernaman	20	9	1993–1994
1993	John Howat	45	2	1993–1996
1993	Mark Pitura	2	0	1993
1993	Robert Schaefer	11	3	1993
1993	Adam Slater	3	1	1993, 1995
1993	Chris Bond	100	32	1993–1997
1993	Duncan Kellaway	180	12	1993–2004
1993	Matthew Richardson	282	800	1993–2009
1993	Stuart Steele	2	0	1993
1993	James Thiessen	7	3	1993
1993	Brad Fox	4	0	1993
1993	Simon Dennis	2	0	1993
1993	Ashley Prescott	90	15	1993–1998
1994	Paul Broderick	169	90	1994–2001
1994	Greg Dear	53	9	1994–1996
1994	Matthew Dundas	14	5	1994–1995
1994	Jamie Elliott	9	1	1994–1995
1994	Michael Gale	91	20	1994–1998
1994	Haydn Robins	4	1	1994
1994	Matthew Rogers	197	163	1994–2004
1994	Jamie Tape	75	4	1994–1997
1994	Mark Neeld	26	16	1994–1996
1994	Justin Murphy	12	9	1994–1995
1994	Mark Merenda	75	62	1994–2000
1995	Stuart Wigney	14	1	1995–1996
1995	David Bourke	85	18	1995–1997, 1999–2001
1995	Justin Charles	54	38	1995–1998
1995	Chris Sullivan	8	4	1995–1996
1995	Stephen Jurica	18	25	1995–1997
1995	Jason Torney	118	16	1995–2002
1996	Darren Gaspar	207	22	1996–2007
1996	Ben Holland	125	124	1996–2003
1996	Ben Harrison	74	39	1996–2000
1996	Ross Funcke	27	1	1996–1999
1996	Damien Ryan	30	6	1996–1998
1996	Ben Moore	24	11	1996–1999
1996	Robert Powell	56	53	1996–2000
1996	Joel Bowden	265	174	1996–2009
1997	Matthew Manfield	6	2	1997–1998
1997	Mark Chaffey	166	34	1997–2006
1997	Brett Evans	28	26	1997–2000
1997	Jason Baldwin	2	0	1997
1997	Daniel Donati	1	0	1997
1997	Ewan Thompson	4	1	1997
1997	Nick Jewell	1	0	1997
1998	Ashley Blurton	14	7	1998–1999
1998	Brad Ottens	129	152	1998–2004
1998	Aaron James	30	19	1998–2000
1998	John Rombotis	13	2	1998–2000
1998	Lionel Proctor	20	4	1998–2001
1998	Andrew Kellaway	172	30	1998–2006
1998	Steven McKee	20	1	1998–1999
1998	Justin Plapp	18	22	1998–1999
1998	Greg Tivendale	188	125	1998–2008
1999	Rory Hilton	82	53	1999–2005
1999	Marc Dragicevic	48	25	1999–2001, 2003–2004
1999	Clay Sampson	27	18	1999–2000
1999	Ben Hollands	8	5	1999
1999	Craig Biddiscombe	44	7	1999–2003
1999	Ray Hall	99	28	1999, 2001–2006

=== 2000s ===
Debut Year	Player	Games	Goals	Years at Club
2000	Leon Cameron	84	40	2000–2003
2000	Clinton King	58	10	2000–2003
2000	Ezra Poyas	9	6	2000–2002
2000	Andrew Mills	14	5	2000–2003
2000	Aaron Fiora	78	25	2000–2004
2000	Royce Vardy	34	3	2000–2003
2000	James White	4	1	2000
2000	Ben Haynes	5	0	2000–2001
2000	Ty Zantuck	68	20	2000–2004
2001	Steven Sziller	38	3	2001–2002
2001	Andrew Krakouer	102	102	2001–2007
2001	Mark Coughlan	92	39	2001–2009
2001	Kayne Pettifer	113	132	2001–2009
2002	Adam Houlihan	33	24	2002–2004
2002	David Rodan	65	43	2002–2006
2002	Greg Stafford	74	83	2002–2006
2002	Paul Hudson	3	1	2002
2002	Craig Ednie	7	3	2002
2002	Chris Newman	268	56	2002–2015
2002	Chris Hyde	93	39	2002–2008
2003	Justin Blumfield	19	5	2003–2004
2003	Kane Johnson	116	32	2003–2008
2003	Tim Fleming	34	10	2003–2004
2003	Bill Nicholls	10	2	2003–2004
2003	Jay Schulz	71	58	2003–2009
2003	Marty McGrath	4	6	2003
2004	Nathan Brown	82	143	2004–2009
2004	Brent Hartigan	35	3	2004–2007
2004	Shane Morrison	8	3	2004–2005
2004	Ben Marsh	7	1	2004
2004	Tom Roach	11	1	2004–2006
2004	Luke Weller	7	3	2004
2004	Simon Fletcher	6	0	2004
2004	Kelvin Moore	87	12	2004–2012
2004	Shane Tuck	173	74	2004–2013
2004	Daniel Jackson	156	61	2004–2014
2004	Andrew Raines	56	1	2004–2009
2005	Brett Deledio	243	182	2005–2016
2005	Mark Graham	20	2	2005
2005	Trent Knobel	21	4	2005–2006
2005	Troy Simmonds	93	66	2005–2010
2005	Danny Meyer	17	7	2005–2007
2005	Richard Tambling	108	61	2005–2010
2005	Adam Pattison	61	15	2005–2009
2005	Nathan Foley	154	44	2005–2014
2005	Will Thursfield	77	0	2005–2011
2006	Patrick Bowden	25	15	2006–2007
2006	Jeremy Humm	1	0	2006
2006	Cleve Hughes	16	23	2006–2008
2006	Jarrad Oakley-Nicholls	13	1	2006–2009
2006	Dean Polo	56	11	2006–2010
2006	Luke McGuane	105	39	2006–2013
2006	Matt White	105	54	2006–2013
2006	Cameron Howat	21	10	2006–2008
2007	Graham Polak	38	16	2007–2010
2007	Shane Edwards	303	189	2007–2022
2007	Jake King	107	79	2007–2014
2007	Kent Kingsley	3	2	2007
2007	Jack Riewoldt	347	787	2007–2023
2007	Daniel Connors	29	11	2007–2012
2007	Angus Graham	48	18	2007–2012
2008	Jordan McMahon	34	9	2008–2009
2008	Mitch Morton	59	94	2008–2011
2008	Trent Cotchin	306	141	2008–2023
2008	Tristan Cartledge	2	1	2008
2009	Andrew Browne	12	2	2009–2012
2009	Ben Cousins	32	12	2009–2010
2009	Tom Hislop	20	10	2009–2011
2009	Robin Nahas	83	100	2009–2013
2009	Alex Rance	200	9	2009–2019
2009	Andrew Collins	25	23	2009–2010
2009	Ty Vickery	119	158	2009–2016
2009	Jarrod Silvester	5	0	2009
2009	Jayden Post	30	6	2009–2012
2009	Adam Thomson	4	1	2009–2010

=== 2010s ===
Debut Year	Player	Games	Goals	Years at Club
2010	Mitch Farmer	28	8	2010–2011
2010	Dustin Martin	302	338	2010–2024
2010	Ben Nason	23	17	2010–2011
2010	Relton Roberts	2	0	2010
2010	David Astbury	155	9	2010–2021
2010	Matt Dea	31	1	2010–2015
2010	Troy Taylor	4	3	2010
2010	Jeromey Webberley	16	3	2010–2012
2010	Ben Griffiths	63	42	2010–2017
2010	Robert Hicks	3	1	2010–2011
2010	David Gourdis	4	0	2010–2011
2010	Jamie O'Reilly	4	0	2010–2011
2010	Dylan Grimes	234	3	2010–2024
2011	Jake Batchelor	84	4	2011–2017
2011	Reece Conca	104	23	2011–2018
2011	Shaun Grigg	171	86	2011–2019
2011	Brad Helbig	16	4	2011–2013
2011	Bachar Houli	206	34	2011–2021
2011	Brad Miller	24	31	2011–2012
2012	Brandon Ellis	176	58	2012–2019
2012	Addam Maric	10	1	2012
2012	Ivan Maric	80	33	2012–2016
2012	Steven Morris	87	12	2012–2017
2012	Brett O'Hanlon	9	2	2012–2014
2012	Todd Elton	10	2	2012–2017
2012	Tom Derickx	2	0	2012
2013	Troy Chaplin	75	5	2013–2016
2013	Ricky Petterd	30	17	2013–2015
2013	Chris Knights	6	7	2013–2015
2015	Nick Vlastuin^	255	29	2013–
2013	Orren Stephenson	7	0	2013–2014
2013	Sam Lonergan	2	0	2013
2013	Aaron Edwards	12	15	2013–2014
2013	Matt Arnot	9	5	2013–2015
2013	Matt McDonough	10	1	2013–2015
2014	Shaun Hampson	35	6	2014–2018
2014	Matt Thomas	15	6	2014–2015
2014	Nathan Gordon	21	18	2014–2015
2014	Sam Lloyd	57	69	2014–2018
2014	Ben Lennon	21	10	2014–2017
2014	Anthony Miles	61	24	2014–2018
2015	Taylor Hunt	42	2	2015–2017
2015	Kamdyn McIntosh	213	62	2015–2025
2015	Kane Lambert	135	78	2015–2022
2015	Nathan Drummond	5	2	2015–2018
2015	Corey Ellis	27	7	2015–2018
2015	Liam McBean	5	1	2015–2016
2015	Connor Menadue	39	11	2015–2019
2016	Daniel Rioli	183	109	2016–2024
2016	Jacob Townsend	20	28	2016–2019
2016	Jayden Short^	198	39	2016–
2016	Andrew Moore	5	1	2016
2016	Jason Castagna	134	127	2016–2022
2016	Nathan Broad^	178	4	2016–
2016	Oleg Markov	23	3	2016–
2016	Adam Marcon	2	1	2016
2016	Callum Moore	8	5	2016–2019
2016	Mabior Chol	31	24	2016–2021
2017	Dan Butler	45	53	2017–2019
2017	Josh Caddy	79	88	2017–2022
2017	Toby Nankervis^	169	42	2017–
2017	Dion Prestia^	149	48	2017–
2017	Ivan Soldo	57	23	2017–2023
2017	Shai Bolton	135	165	2017–2024
2017	Tyson Stengle	2	2	2017–2018
2017	Jack Graham	131	54	2017–2024
2018	Jack Higgins	43	29	2018–2020
2018	Ryan Garthwaite	14	0	2018–2021
2018	Liam Baker	128	54	2018–2024
2019	Noah Balta^	125	46	2019–
2019	Tom Lynch^	110	241	2019–
2019	Mav Weller	2	1	2019
2019	Sydney Stack	35	14	2019–2022
2019	Jack Ross^	102	21	2019–
2019	Callum Coleman-Jones	9	11	2019–2021
2019	Patrick Naish	9	3	2019–2021
2019	Derek Eggmolesse-Smith	9	0	2019–2021
2019	Marlion Pickett	91	27	2019–2024

=== 2020s ===
Debut Year	Player	Games	Goals	Years at Club
2020	Jake Aarts	42	34	2019–2022
2020	Thomson Dow	45	2	2020–2025
2021	Rhyan Mansell^	74	52	2021–
2021	Will Martyn	3	0	2020–2022
2021	Riley Collier-Dawkins	11	3	2019–2022
2021	Hugo Ralphsmith^	67	23	2020–
2021	Samson Ryan^	28	15	2021–
2021	Matthew Parker	11	7	2021–2022
2021	Maurice Rioli Jr.^	55	32	2021–
2021	Ben Miller^	78	9	2018–
2022	Josh Gibcus^	22	3	2022–
2022	Robbie Tarrant	20	0	2022–2023
2022	Bigoa Nyuon	1	0	2020–2023
2022	Noah Cumberland	25	33	2020–2024
2022	Judson Clarke^	17	14	2022–
2022	Tyler Sonsie	47	12	2022–2025
2023	Jacob Hopper^	59	16	2023–
2023	Tim Taranto^	66	43	2023–
2023	Tylar Young	35	0	2023–2025
2023	Sam Banks^	49	7	2023–
2023	Jacob Bauer	12	11	2023–2025
2023	Matt Coulthard	6	2	2023–2024
2023	Tom Brown^	49	10	2022–
2023	James Trezise^	29	3	2023–
2024	Seth Campbell^	52	50	2023–
2024	Jacob Koschitzke	16	12	2023–2025
2024	Sam Naismith	3	0	2024
2024	Mykelti Lefau^	19	23	2024–
2024	Kane McAuliffe^	20	2	2024–
2024	Steely Green^	34	26	2024–
2024	Kaleb Smith^	12	1	2024–
2024	Jacob Blight	10	3	2024–2025
2025	Harry Armstrong^	11	7	2025–
2025	Sam Lalor^	18	19	2025–
2025	Luke Trainor^	25	1	2025–
2025	Liam Fawcett^	4	6	2024–
2025	Jonty Faull^	24	14	2025–
2025	Campbell Gray^	11	1	2025–
2025	Tom Sims^	11	4	2025–
2025	Jasper Alger^	5	2	2025–
2025	Taj Hotton^	7	3	2025–
2026	Sam Grlj^	8	0	2026–
2026	Oliver Hayes-Brown^	3	0	2024–
2026	Patrick Retschko^	4	0	2025–
2026	Tom Burton^	3	0	2025–
2026	Sam Cumming^	3	21	2025–

== Other AFL-listed players ==
=== Listed players yet to make their debut for Richmond ===
Player	Date of birth	Acquired	Recruited from	Listed	
Player	Date of birth	Acquired	Recruited from	Rookie	Senior
Josh Smillie	17 May 2006	No. 7, 2024 national draft	Eastern Ranges	—N/a	2024–
Zane Peucker	4 December 2007	No. 31, 2025 national draft	Woodville-West Torrens	—N/a	2025–
Noah Roberts-Thomson	29 March 2007	No. 54, 2025 national draft	Sturt	—N/a	2025–

=== Formerly listed players who never played a senior game for Richmond ===
Includes players delisted since 2000

Player	Date of birth	Acquired	Listed	
Player	Date of birth	Acquired	Rookie	Senior
Matthew Greig	11 May 1978	No. 68, 1998 national draft	—N/a	1999–2000
Robbie Taylor	29 April 1979	No. 8, 1999 rookie draft	1999–2000	—N/a
Paddy Steinfort	20 February 1979	No. 16, 1996 national draft	—N/a	1997–2001
Adrian Burgiel	16 April 1980	No. 24, 2001 rookie draft	2001	—N/a
Michael Barker	11 June 1982	No. 39, 2001 rookie draft	2001	—N/a
Kristian De Pasquale	25 September 1980	No. 14, 2002 rookie draft	2002	—N/a
Simon Hart	10 August 1979	No. 56, 2002 rookie draft	2002	—N/a
Scott Homewood	13 May 1982	No. 39, 1999 national draft	—N/a	2000–2002
Matt King	7 November 1983	No. 45, 2002 rookie draft	2002	—N/a
Brad Miller		No. 30, 2002 rookie draft	2002	—N/a
Garth Taylor	10 July 1980	No. 30, 2001 rookie draft	2001–2002	—N/a
Adam Pickering	18 April 1981	No. 35, 2003 rookie draft	2003	—N/a
Matthew Shir	12 September 1981	No. 19, 2003 rookie draft	2003	—N/a
Daniel Sipthorp	26 August 1984	No. 62, 2002 national draft	—N/a	2003
Kyle Archibald	23 February 1986	No. 81, 2003 national draft	—N/a	2004–2005
Alex Gilmour	29 June 1986	No. 21, 2003 national draft	—N/a	2004–2005
Dean Limbach	25 October 1986	No. 52, 2004 national draft	—N/a	2005–2006
Tasman Clingan	4 July 1988	No. 8, 2007 rookie draft	2007	—N/a
Carl Peterson	3 July 1987	No. 60, 2006 national draft	—N/a	2007
Travis Casserly	20 May 1987	No. 40, 2005 national draft	—N/a	2006–2008
Clayton Collard	4 December 1988	No. 1, 2008 rookie draft	2008	—N/a
Dean Putt	10 April 1989	No. 51, 2007 national draft	—N/a	2008–2009
Alroy Gilligan	9 July 1990	No. 53, 2009 rookie draft	2009–2010	—N/a
Pat Contin	23 May 1991	No. 23, 2010 rookie draft	2010–2011	—N/a
Ben Jakobi	1 April 1991	No. 11, 2011 rookie draft	2011	—N/a
Nick Westhoff	11 May 1991	No. 74, 2010 rookie draft	2010–2011	—N/a
Piva Wright	28 June 1993	No. 74, 2012 rookie draft	2012	—N/a
Gibson Turner	20 July 1993	No. 60, 2012 rookie draft	2012	—N/a
John Heslin	27 June 1992	No. 90, 2012 rookie draft	2012	—N/a
Dean MacDonald	6 July 1992	No. 51, 2010 national draft	—N/a	2011–2012
Steven Verrier	24 June 1993	No. 43, 2012 rookie draft	2012–2013	—N/a
Todd Banfield	28 June 1990	No. 11, 2014 rookie draft	2014	—N/a
Ben Darrou	25 November 1993	No. 25, 2012 rookie draft	2012–2014	—N/a
Cadeyn Williams	4 August 1994	No. 40, 2013 rookie draft	2013–2014	—N/a
Reece McKenzie	28 March 1996	No. 77, 2014 national draft	—N/a	2015–2016
Chris Yarran	19 December 1990	Traded from Carlton	—N/a	2016
Luke English	20 August 2000	No. 62, 2018 national draft	—N/a	2019–2020
Fraser Turner	26 December 2000	No. 58, 2018 national draft	—N/a	2019–2020
Kaelan Bradtke	21 May 2001	Pre-season supplemental signing	2023	—N/a
Mate Colina	20 May 1999	Category B rookie signing, 2020	2021–2025	—N/a

== AFL Women's players ==
Key
Order	Players are listed in order of debut, then alphabetically by surname
Seasons	Includes Brisbane Lions only careers
Debut	Debuts are for AFL Women's regular season and finals series matches only
Games	Statistics are for AFL Women's regular season and finals series matches only and are correct to the end of round 5, 2022.
Goals	Statistics are for AFL Women's regular season and finals series matches only and are correct to the end of round 5, 2022.
^{^}	Currently listed players

=== 2020s ===
Order	Name	Seasons	Debut	Games	Goals
1	Laura Bailey	2020	round 1, 2020	5	0
2	Christina Bernardi	2020–22 (S6)	round 1, 2020	19	12
3	Maddy Brancatisano	2020–22 (S7)	round 1, 2020	32	0
4	Katie Brennan^	2020–	round 1, 2020	29	36
5	Hannah Burchell	2020–22 (S6)	round 1, 2020	18	0
6	Monique Conti^	2020–	round 1, 2020	36	11
7	Alice Edmonds	2020–21	round 1, 2020	6	0
8	Sabrina Frederick	2020–21	round 1, 2020	15	5
9	Kodi Jacques	2020–22 (S7)	round 1, 2020	26	3
10	Akec Makur Chuot	2020–22 (S6)	round 1, 2020	17	1
11	Laura McClelland^	2020–	round 1, 2020	20	1
12	Rebecca Miller^	2020–	round 1, 2020	32	0
13	Sophie Molan	2020–22 (S7)	round 1, 2020	24	1
14	Phoebe Monahan	2020–21	round 1, 2020	12	0
15	Sarah Sansonetti	2020–22 (S6)	round 1, 2020	17	0
16	Gabby Seymour^	2020–	round 1, 2020	37	2
17	Tayla Stahl	2020–22 (S6)	round 1, 2020	21	13
18	Lauren Tesoriero	2020	round 1, 2020	4	0
19	Courtney Wakefield	2020–22 (S7)	round 1, 2020	30	31
20	Holly Whitford	2020–21	round 1, 2020	4	0
21	Alana Woodward	2020–21	round 1, 2020	5	0
22	Grace Campbell	2020	round 2, 2020	5	0
23	Ella Wood	2020	round 3, 2020	3	0
24	Kate Dempsey^	2020–	round 5, 2020	32	1
25	Nekaela Butler	2020	round 6, 2020	1	0
26	Ciara Fitzgerald	2020	round 6, 2020	1	0
27	Iilish Ross	2020–21	round 6, 2020	10	0
28	Harriet Cordner^	2021–22 (S6)	round 1, 2021	12	0
29	Sarah D'Arcy	2021–2023	round 1, 2021	19	1
30	Sarah Dargan	2021–2022 (S6)	round 1, 2021	11	2
31	Sarah Hosking^	2021–	round 1, 2021	25	2
32	Luka Lesosky-Hay	2021	round 1, 2021	1	0
33	Ellie McKenzie^	2021–	round 1, 2021	26	8
34	Tessa Lavey	2021–2025	round 3, 2021	25	4
35	Jess Hosking	2022 (S6)– 2023	round 1, 2022 (S6)	20	1
36	Poppy Kelly^	2022 (S6)–	round 1, 2022 (S6)	13	0
37	Meagan Kiely^	2022 (S6)–2023	round 1, 2022 (S6)	19	4
38	Beth Lynch^	2022 (S6)–	round 1, 2022 (S6)	22	0
39	Stella Reid	2022 (S6)–2024	round 1, 2022 (S6)	14	6
40	Maddie Shevlin^	2022 (S6)–	round 1, 2022 (S6)	17	3
41	Emelia Yassir^	2022 (S6)–	round 1, 2022 (S6)	19	7
42	Meg Macdonald	2022 (S6)– 2023	round 2, 2022 (S6)	16	1
43	Katelyn Cox	2022 (S7)–2025	round 1, 2022 (S7)	32	1
44	Grace Egan	2022 (S7)– 2025	round 1, 2022 (S7)	12	4
45	Libby Graham^	2022 (S7)–	round 1, 2022 (S7)	12	0
46	Eilish Sheerin	2022 (S7)–2024	round 1, 2022 (S7)	12	1
47	Stephanie Williams	2022 (S7)– 2023	round 1, 2022 (S7)	5	0
48	Jemima Woods	2022 (S7)–2024	round 5, 2022 (S7)	5	0
49	Caitlin Greiser^	2023–	round 1, 2023	1	1
50	Courtney Jones	2023–2024	round 1, 2023	1	1
51	Molly Eastman	2023–2024	round 3, 2023	1	0
52	Charli Wicksteed^	2023–	round 3, 2023	1	0
53	Shannon Danckert	2023	round 6, 2023	1	1
54	Lauren Caruso	2023	round 7, 2023	1	0
55	Charley Ryan	2023–2025	round 1, 2024	6	0
56	Shelby Knoll	2023-25	round 12, 2025	1	1
57	Jodie Hicks	2024–2025	round 1, 2023	1	0
58	Ally Dallaway^	2024–	round 1, 2024	1	0
59	Mackenzie Ford^	2024–	round 2, 2024	1	0
60	Isabel Bacon^	2024–	round 2, 2024	1	0
61	Tamara Luke	2024	round 4, 2024	6	2
62	Lulu Beatty	2025	round 1, 2025	3	0
63	Montana Beruldsen^	2025–	round 1, 2025	2	0
64	Paige Scott^	2025–	round 1, 2025	2	1
65	Sierra Grieves^	2025–	round 3, 2025	2	1
66	Lauren Brazzale	2025	round 4, 2025	2	0
67	Montana McKinnon^	2025–	round 4, 2025	2	1
68	Aoibhin Cleary^	2025–	round 11, 2025	2	1

== Other AFL Women's-listed players ==
=== Listed players yet to make their debut for Richmond ===
Player	Date of birth	Acquired	Recruited from	Listed	
Player	Date of birth	Acquired	Recruited from	Rookie	Senior
Zoe Hargreaves	18 May 2006	No. 20, 2024 draft	Northern Knights	—N/a	2025–
Georgia Stubs	16 July 2005	Trade	North Melbourne	—N/a	2025–
Dana East	10 June 2002	Trade	Fremantle	—N/a	2025–
Ana Mulholland	2004	International rookie	Antrim GAA	—N/a	2025–
Olivia Wolmarans	2 September 2007	No.1, 2025 draft	Subiaco	—N/a	2025–
Fina Dethlefsen	25 July 2003	No.38, 2025 draft	Perth	—N/a	2025–
Baia Pugh	28 March 2007	No.54, 2025 draft	Gippsland Power	—N/a	2025–

=== Formerly listed players who never played a senior game for Richmond ===
Player	Date of birth	Acquired	Listed	
Player	Date of birth	Acquired	Rookie	Senior
Emma Horne	29 November 2001	No. 73, 2019 draft	—N/a	2020
Emily Harley	4 December 2001	No. 93, 2019 draft	—N/a	2020–2021
Cleo Saxon-Jones	4 November 2001	No. 58, 2019 draft	—N/a	2020–2021
Hannah McLaren	10 May 2000	Injury replacement signing 2021	—N/a	2021–2022 (S6)
Ingrid Houtsma	20 November 2003	No. 50, 2021 draft	—N/a	2022 (S6)
Akayla Peterson	2 October 1994	Elevated train-on player, mid-season 2022 (S6)	—N/a	2022 (S6)
Saraid Taylor	2 July 1998	Rookie signing, 2022	—N/a	2022 (S7)
Lilly Pearce	31 December 2002	Injury replacement signing, 2023	—N/a	2023
Amelia Peck	13 January 2000	Injury replacement signing, 2022	—N/a	2022 (S7)–2024
Imogen Brown	3 March 2005	Injury replacement signing, 2024	—N/a	2024

== See also ==
- List of Richmond Football Club coaches
