= Tony Hunt =

Tony Hunt may refer to:

- Tony Hunt Sr. (1942–2017), Canadian First Nations artist
- Tony Hunt (Australian footballer) (born 1952), former Australian rules footballer
- Tony Hunt (American football) (born 1985), former professional American football running back
- Tony Hunt (judge), Irish High Court judge
- Tony Hunt (academic) (1944–2025), medievalist
