= Collopy =

Collopy is a surname. The name originated from the word "collop" meaning a fully grown horse or cow. Notable people with the surname include:

- Daniel Collopy (born 1978), Australian actor
- Will Collopy (1897–1972), Australian rules footballer
- Paul D Collopy (1956-), Systems Engineer
- Arianne Collopy (1990-), Design Scientist
