= Paul Morrison =

Paul Morrison may refer to:

- Paul Morrison (director) (born 1944), British film director & screenwriter
- Paul Morrison (footballer) (1952–2011), Australian rules footballer
- Paul J. Morrison (born 1954), American politician and lawyer
- Paul Morrison (artist) (born 1966), English painter
- J. Paul Morrison, Canadian, British-born, software architect and computer scientist
