= Stephen Parsons =

Stephen Parsons may refer to:

- Stephen W. Parsons, British musician
- Stephen Parsons (Australian footballer)
- Steve Parsons (English footballer), also known as Stephen Paul James Parsons

== See also ==
- Stephen Parsons House, historic house in Maine, USA
