= Petzke =

Petzke is a surname. Notable people with the surname include:

- Dave Petzke (born c. 1957), American former college football player
- Gus Petzke (1896–1967), Australian rules footballer
- Ingo Petzke (born 1947), German film scholar, filmmaker and author
- James Petzke, American politician and businessman elected in 2022
