= Arthur Kight =

Australian rules footballer, born 1901

Personal information
- Full name: Arthur Joseph Kight
- Born: 13 October 1901; Richmond, Victoria
- Died: 11 May 1987 (aged 85); Kew, Victoria
- Height: 173 cm (5 ft 8 in)
- Weight: 67 kg (148 lb)

Playing career^{1}
Years	Club	Games (Goals)
1923	Richmond	1 (0)
- ^{1} Playing statistics correct to the end of 1923.

Arthur Joseph Kight (13 October 1901 – 11 May 1987) was an Australian rules footballer who played for the Richmond Football Club in the Victorian Football League (VFL).

His brother, Frank Kight, also played for Richmond a few years after Arthur.
