= Eric Leech =

Australian rules footballer

Personal information
- Full name: Eric Leech
- Born: 21 May 1951 (age 75)
- Original team: Tyntynder
- Height: 189 cm (6 ft 2 in)
- Weight: 91 kg (201 lb)
- Position: Defence

Playing career^{1}
Years	Club	Games (Goals)
1970–79	Richmond	79 (0)
- ^{1} Playing statistics correct to the end of 1979.

Eric Leech (born 21 May 1951) is a former Australian rules footballer who played with Richmond in the Victorian Football League (VFL).
