= Ernie McDonald =

Australian rules footballer

Personal information
- Full name: Ernest Victor McDonald
- Born: 26 January 1883; South Melbourne, Victoria
- Died: 30 September 1971 (aged 88); Thornbury, Victoria

Playing career^{1}
Years	Club	Games (Goals)
1902–07	Richmond (VFA)	70 (53)
1908	Richmond	4 (0)
- ^{1} Playing statistics correct to the end of 1908.

Ernest Victor McDonald (26 January 1883 – 30 September 1971) was an Australian rules footballer who played with Richmond in the Victorian Football League (VFL).
