= Dick Godfrey =

Australian rules footballer

Personal information
- Full name: Richard Wilfred Godfrey
- Born: 12 September 1888; North Melbourne, Victoria
- Died: 24 April 1972 (aged 83); Hawthorn, Victoria
- Original team: Hawthorn (VFA)

Playing career^{1}
Years	Club	Games (Goals)
1917	Richmond	4 (0)
- ^{1} Playing statistics correct to the end of 1917.

Richard Wilfred Godfrey (12 September 1888 – 24 April 1972) was an Australian rules footballer who played with Richmond in the Victorian Football League (VFL).
