= Peter Loughran =

Australian rules footballer

Personal information
- Full name: Peter Loughran
- Born: 3 December 1940
- Original team: Wonthaggi
- Height: 175 cm (5 ft 9 in)
- Weight: 71 kg (157 lb)
- Position: Back pocket

Playing career^{1}
Years	Club	Games (Goals)
1959–63	Richmond	50 (6)
- ^{1} Playing statistics correct to the end of 1963.

Peter Loughran (born 3 December 1940) is a former Australian rules footballer who played with Richmond in the Victorian Football League (VFL).
