= Bill Marshall (Australian footballer) =

Australian rules footballer

Personal information
- Full name: William James Henry Marshall
- Born: 26 March 1892; North Melbourne, Victoria
- Died: 13 December 1945 (aged 53); Parkville, Victoria
- Height: 184 cm (6 ft 0 in)
- Weight: 87 kg (192 lb)

Playing career^{1}
Years	Club	Games (Goals)
1915	Richmond	3 (0)
- ^{1} Playing statistics correct to the end of 1915.

William James Henry Marshall (26 March 1892 – 13 December 1945) was an Australian rules footballer who played three games with Richmond in the Victorian Football League (VFL).
