= Max Currie =

Australian rules footballer

Personal information
- Full name: Max Currie
- Born: 26 May 1926
- Died: 28 November 2001 (aged 75)
- Original team: Ormond Amateurs
- Height: 193 cm (6 ft 4 in)
- Weight: 83 kg (183 lb)

Playing career^{1}
Years	Club	Games (Goals)
1947–51	Richmond	34 (17)
- ^{1} Playing statistics correct to the end of 1951.

Max Currie (26 May 1926 – 28 November 2001) was a former Australian rules footballer who played with Richmond in the Victorian Football League (VFL).
