= Pat Dooley (footballer) =

Australian rules footballer (1898–1969)

Personal information
- Full name: Patrick Dooley
- Born: 20 October 1898; Longwood, Victoria
- Died: 3 April 1969 (aged 70); Bundoora, Victoria
- Original team: Surreys

Playing career^{1}
Years	Club	Games (Goals)
1918–19	Richmond	15 (1)
- ^{1} Playing statistics correct to the end of 1919.

Patrick Dooley (20 October 1898 – 3 April 1969) was an Australian rules footballer who played with Richmond in the Victorian Football League (VFL).
