= Pat Curran (Australian footballer) =

Australian rules footballer

Personal information
- Full name: Pat Curran
- Born: 11 March 1946 (age 80)
- Original team: Robinvale
- Height: 182 cm (6 ft 0 in)
- Weight: 80 kg (176 lb)

Playing career^{1}
Years	Club	Games (Goals)
1968	Richmond	1 (0)
- ^{1} Playing statistics correct to the end of 1968.

Pat Curran (born 11 March 1946) is a former Australian rules footballer who played with Richmond in the Victorian Football League (VFL).
