= Wally Cook =

Australian rules footballer

Personal information
- Full name: Wally Cook
- Born: 12 December 1925
- Died: 21 November 1999 (aged 73)
- Original team: Auburn
- Height: 177 cm (5 ft 10 in)
- Weight: 69 kg (152 lb)

Playing career^{1}
| Years | Club | Games (Goals) |
| 1947 | Richmond | 4 (0) |
- ^{1} Playing statistics correct to the end of 1947.

Wally Cook (12 December 1925 – 21 November 1999) was a former Australian rules footballer who played with Richmond in the Victorian Football League (VFL).
