= George O'Hehir =

Australian rules footballer

Personal information
- Full name: George Stanley O'Hehir
- Born: 20 August 1891; Bullarto, Victoria
- Died: 29 January 1956 (aged 64); Ballarat, Victoria

Playing career^{1}
Years	Club	Games (Goals)
1921	Richmond	1 (0)
- ^{1} Playing statistics correct to the end of 1921.

George Stanley O'Hehir (20 August 1891 – 29 January 1956) was an Australian rules footballer who played with Richmond in the Victorian Football League (VFL).

== Early life ==
The son of Michael O’Hehir (1856–1922) and Mary Wheelan (1859–1925), George Stanley O'Hehir was born at Bullarto on 20 August 1891.

== Football career ==
O'Hehir commenced playing at Bullarto, winning a premiership in 1915. He was a noted sportsman in the district, also competing in boxing, shooting and woodchopping.

In 1918, George and his brother Michael moved to Koo Wee Rup, and played football for the local team. George O'Hehir's prominent performances for Koo Wee Rup led to St. Kilda seeking to secure his services in late 1920, but they were unable to locate him. In June 1921 Richmond secured a permit for O'Hehir and after training once he played a single game for them, playing well enough to earn some praise from the highly critical scribe attached to the local Richmond paper. He did not play another game for Richmond and returned to the Koo Wee Rup area, later playing with Bayles.

== Life after football ==
In 1926, O'Hehir married Mary Ellen Dineen and they returned to Bullarto, with George working as a farmer. In 1933 he established a sawmill at Blakeville. He subsequently also established a sawmill at Crystal Creek (near Alexandra).

George O'Hehir and his wife moved to Ballarat in their later years, and O'Hehir died in a private hospital there on 29 January 1956.
