= Ken Stonehouse =

Australian rules footballer

Personal information
- Full name: Ken Stonehouse
- Born: 23 April 1956 (age 70)
- Original team: Jordanville
- Height: 180 cm (5 ft 11 in)
- Weight: 76 kg (168 lb)

Playing career^{1}
Years	Club	Games (Goals)
1976, 1978	Richmond	12 (4)
- ^{1} Playing statistics correct to the end of 1978.

Ken Stonehouse (born 23 April 1956) is a former Australian rules footballer who played with Richmond in the Victorian Football League (VFL).
