= Maurie O'Connell =

Australian rules footballer, born 1917

Personal information
- Full name: Maurice Michael O'Connell
- Born: 5 March 1917; Richmond, Victoria
- Died: 17 August 2005 (aged 88)
- Height: 180 cm (5 ft 11 in)
- Weight: 73 kg (161 lb)

Playing career^{1}
Years	Club	Games (Goals)
1937, 1939–41	Richmond	34 (41)
- ^{1} Playing statistics correct to the end of 1941.

Maurice Michael O'Connell (5 March 1917 – 17 August 2005) was an Australian rules footballer who played with Richmond in the Victorian Football League (VFL).

O'Connell later served in the Australian Army during World War II.
