= Leo Dobrigh =

Australian rules footballer

Personal information
- Full name: Joseph Leo Dobrigh
- Born: 6 December 1898; Bairnsdale, Victoria
- Died: 17 April 1973 (aged 74); St Kilda, Victoria
- Original team: Mirboo North
- Height: 177 cm (5 ft 10 in)
- Weight: 73.5 kg (162 lb)

Playing career^{1}
Years	Club	Games (Goals)
1920	Melbourne	1 (0)
1923	Richmond	2 (0)
Total		3 (0)
- ^{1} Playing statistics correct to the end of 1923.

Joseph Leo Dobrigh (6 December 1898 – 17 April 1973) was an Australian rules footballer who played with Melbourne and Richmond in the Victorian Football League (VFL).
