= Laurie O'Toole =

Australian Australian rules footballer (1937–2013)

Personal information
- Full name: Laurence Michael O'Toole
- Born: 23 October 1937
- Died: 3 December 2013 (aged 76)
- Original team: Mentone CYMS (CYMSFA)
- Height: 188 cm (6 ft 2 in)
- Weight: 83 kg (183 lb)
- Position: Ruck / Centre Half Forward

Playing career^{1}
Years	Club	Games (Goals)
1959–60	Richmond	13 (8)
- ^{1} Playing statistics correct to the end of 1960.

Laurence Michael O'Toole (23 October 1937 – 3 December 2013) was an Australian rules footballer who played with Richmond in the Victorian Football League (VFL).
