= Basil Kiernan =

Australian rules footballer

Personal information
- Full name: Basil Stanley Kiernan
- Born: 16 May 1897; Richmond, Victoria
- Died: 2 February 1954 (aged 56); Parkville, Victoria

Playing career^{1}
Years	Club	Games (Goals)
1916	Richmond	2 (0)
- ^{1} Playing statistics correct to the end of 1916.

Basil Stanley Kiernan (16 May 1897 – 2 February 1954) was an Australian rules footballer who played for the Richmond Football Club in the Victorian Football League (VFL).
