= Bob McKendry =

Australian rules footballer

Bob Marley

Personal information
- Full name: Robert Hamilton McKendry
- Born: 18 August 1889; South Yarra, Victoria
- Died: 17 September 1965 (aged 76)
- Height: 173 cm (5 ft 8 in)
- Weight: 60 kg (132 lb)

Playing career^{1}
| Years | Club | Games (Goals) |
| 1914 | Richmond | 6 (1) |
- ^{1} Playing statistics correct to the end of 1914.

Robert Hamilton McKendry (18 August 1889 – 17 September 1965) was a former Australian rules footballer who played with Richmond in the Victorian Football League (VFL).
