= Les Irwin (footballer) =

Australian rules footballer

Personal information
- Full name: Leslie George Irwin
- Born: 3 March 1887; Moonee Ponds, Victoria
- Died: 7 September 1965 (aged 78); Mudgee, New South Wales

Playing career^{1}
| Years | Club | Games (Goals) |
| 1909–10 | Melbourne | 14 (4) |
| 1911 | Richmond | 6 (0) |
| 1913–14 | South Adelaide | |
| Total | | 20 (4) |
- ^{1} Playing statistics correct to the end of 1911.

Leslie George Irwin MM (3 March 1887 – 7 September 1965) was an Australian rules footballer who played with Melbourne and Richmond in the Victorian Football League (VFL). He was awarded the Military Medal in the First World War.

After fourteen games with Melbourne over two seasons, Irwin crossed to Richmond at the start of the 1911 season. In 1913 he was granted a clearance to South Australia and he played for South Adelaide for two seasons before enlisting to serve in World War I.
