= Bob Rees =

Australian rules footballer

Personal information
- Full name: Bob Rees
- Born: 3 October 1938
- Height: 178 cm (5 ft 10 in)
- Weight: 66 kg (146 lb)

Playing career^{1}
Years	Club	Games (Goals)
1959	Richmond	6 (1)
- ^{1} Playing statistics correct to the end of 1959.

Bob Rees (born 3 October 1938) is a former Australian rules footballer who played with Richmond in the Victorian Football League (VFL).
