= Kevin Crohan =

Australian rules footballer

Personal information
- Full name: Kevin Crohan
- Born: 21 September 1920
- Died: 3 November 1972 (aged 52)
- Original team: Burnley
- Height: 168 cm (5 ft 6 in)
- Weight: 73 kg (161 lb)

Playing career^{1}
| Years | Club | Games (Goals) |
| 1942 | Richmond | 1 (0) |
- ^{1} Playing statistics correct to the end of 1942.

Kevin Crohan (21 September 1920 – 3 November 1972) was a former Australian rules footballer who played with Richmond in the Victorian Football League (VFL).
