= Ian Gardner (footballer) =

Australian rules footballer

Personal information
- Full name: Ian Gardner
- Born: 19 January 1937
- Original team: Oakleigh
- Height: 191 cm (6 ft 3 in)
- Weight: 81 kg (179 lb)

Playing career^{1}
Years	Club	Games (Goals)
1958–59	Richmond	10 (6)
- ^{1} Playing statistics correct to the end of 1959.

Ian Gardner (born 19 January 1937) is a former Australian rules footballer who played with Richmond in the Victorian Football League (VFL).
