= John Manton (footballer) =

Australian rules footballer

Personal information
- Full name: John Manton
- Born: 18 April 1963 (age 63)
- Original team: Old Geelong
- Height: 191 cm (6 ft 3 in)
- Weight: 84 kg (185 lb)
- Position: Defence

Playing career^{1}
Years	Club	Games (Goals)
1984–89	Richmond	59 (38)
- ^{1} Playing statistics correct to the end of 1989.

John Manton (born 18 April 1963) is a former Australian rules footballer who played with Richmond in the Victorian Football League (VFL).
