= Pat Audas =

Australian rules footballer (born 1932)

Personal information
- Full name: Patrick Francis Audas
- Born: 17 March 1932
- Original team: South Melbourne Reserves
- Height: 180 cm (5 ft 11 in)
- Weight: 73 kg (161 lb)

Playing career^{1}
Years	Club	Games (Goals)
1952–54	Richmond	14 (7)
- ^{1} Playing statistics correct to the end of 1954.

Patrick Francis Audas (born 17 March 1932) is a former Australian rules footballer who played with Richmond in the Victorian Football League (VFL).
