= Greg Naylor =

Australian rules footballer

Personal information
- Full name: Greg Naylor
- Born: 30 August 1957 (age 69)
- Original team: Wesley College
- Height: 183 cm (6 ft 0 in)
- Weight: 84 kg (185 lb)

Playing career^{1}
Years	Club	Games (Goals)
1977–80	Richmond	18 (4)
- ^{1} Playing statistics correct to the end of 1980.

Greg Naylor (born 30 August 1957) is a former Australian rules footballer who played with Richmond in the Victorian Football League (VFL).
