= Martin Davis (Australian footballer) =

Australian rules footballer

Personal information
- Full name: Martin Davis
- Born: 27 November 1936 (age 89)
- Original team: East Burwood
- Height: 177 cm (5 ft 10 in)
- Weight: 81 kg (179 lb)

Playing career^{1}
Years	Club	Games (Goals)
1956	Richmond	4 (1)
- ^{1} Playing statistics correct to the end of 1956.

Martin Davis (born 27 November 1936) is a former Australian rules footballer. He played with Richmond in the Victorian Football League (VFL).
