= Percy Speakman =

Australian rules footballer (1885–1933)

Personal information
- Full name: Percival Lee Speakman
- Born: 5 November 1885; Flemington, Victoria
- Died: 12 May 1933 (aged 47); Melbourne, Victoria
- Height: 179 cm (5 ft 10 in)
- Weight: 83 kg (183 lb)

Playing career^{1}
Years	Club	Games (Goals)
1908	Richmond	4 (4)
- ^{1} Playing statistics correct to the end of 1908.

Percicval Lee Speakman (5 November 1885 – 12 May 1933) was an Australian rules footballer who played with Richmond in the Victorian Football League (VFL).
