= Kevin Barnewall =

Australian rules footballer

Personal information
- Full name: Kevin Barnewall
- Born: 4 August 1925
- Died: 14 October 2009 (aged 84)
- Original team: Assumption College
- Height: 179 cm (5 ft 10 in)
- Weight: 76 kg (168 lb)

Playing career^{1}
Years	Club	Games (Goals)
1945	Richmond	4 (0)
- ^{1} Playing statistics correct to the end of 1945.

Kevin Barnewall (4 August 1925 – 14 October 2009) was a former Australian rules footballer who played with Richmond in the Victorian Football League (VFL).
