= Dick Price (footballer) =

Australian rules footballer

Personal information
- Full name: Richard Lewis Price
- Born: 26 June 1891; Mount Egerton, Victoria
- Died: 4 August 1965 (aged 74); Heidelberg, Victoria

Playing career^{1}
Years	Club	Games (Goals)
1912	Richmond	5 (0)
- ^{1} Playing statistics correct to the end of 1912.

Richard Lewis Price (26 June 1891 – 4 August 1965) was an Australian rules footballer who played with Richmond in the Victorian Football League (VFL).
