= Brian Pilcher =

Australian rules footballer

Personal information
- Full name: Brian Pilcher
- Born: 22 November 1935
- Height: 180 cm (5 ft 11 in)
- Weight: 91 kg (201 lb)

Playing career^{1}
Years	Club	Games (Goals)
1957–58	Richmond	9 (2)
- ^{1} Playing statistics correct to the end of 1958.

Brian Pilcher (born 22 November 1935) is a former Australian rules footballer who played with Richmond in the Victorian Football League (VFL).
