= Owen Madigan =

Australian rules footballer

Personal information
- Full name: Owen Madigan
- Born: 4 April 1942 (age 84)
- Original team: Yarraville
- Height: 179 cm (5 ft 10 in)
- Weight: 76 kg (168 lb)
- Position: Back Pocket

Playing career^{1}
Years	Club	Games (Goals)
1961–62	Footscray	7 (2)
1963–66	Richmond	40 (1)
Total		47 (3)
- ^{1} Playing statistics correct to the end of 1966.

Owen Madigan (born 4 April 1942) is a former Australian rules footballer who played with Footscray and Richmond in the Victorian Football League (VFL).
