= Hugh Mulcahy (footballer) =

Australian rules footballer

Personal information
- Full name: Hugh Mulcahy
- Born: 19 June 1894; Kensington, Victoria
- Died: 1 October 1965 (aged 71); Preston, Victoria

Playing career^{1}
Years	Club	Games (Goals)
1918	Richmond	1 (0)
- ^{1} Playing statistics correct to the end of 1918.

Hugh Mulcahy (19 June 1894 – 1 October 1965) was an Australian rules footballer who played with Richmond in the Victorian Football League (VFL).
