= Gordon Peake =

Australian rules footballer

Personal information
- Full name: Gordon William Peake
- Born: 26 January 1935 (age 91)
- Height: 178 cm (5 ft 10 in)
- Weight: 85 kg (187 lb)

Playing career^{1}
Years	Club	Games (Goals)
1957–58	Richmond	6 (0)
1959–63	Oakleigh (VFA)	
- ^{1} Playing statistics correct to the end of 1963.

Gordon William Peake (born 26 January 1935) is a former Australian rules footballer who played with Richmond in the Victorian Football League (VFL).

== Family ==
He married Barbara Ann Wing in 1959.
