= Percy Barton (Australian footballer) =

Australian rules footballer

Personal information
- Full name: Percival Norman Barton
- Born: 9 September 1888; Marysville, Victoria
- Died: 6 December 1912 (aged 24); Melbourne, Victoria
- Original team: Yea

Playing career^{1}
Years	Club	Games (Goals)
1909	Richmond	2 (0)
- ^{1} Playing statistics correct to the end of 1909.

Percival Norman Barton (9 September 1888 – 6 December 1912) was an Australian rules footballer who played with Richmond in the Victorian Football League (VFL). He died aged 24 in a motor cycle accident in Melbourne.
