= Chris Pym =

Australian rules footballer (born 1966)

Personal information
- Full name: Chris Pym
- Born: 23 April 1966 (age 60)
- Original team: Wycheproof-Narraport
- Height: 185 cm (6 ft 1 in)
- Weight: 85 kg (187 lb)

Playing career^{1}
Years	Club	Games (Goals)
1988–89	Richmond	24 (13)
- ^{1} Playing statistics correct to the end of 1989.

Chris Pym (born 23 April 1966) is a former Australian rules footballer who played with Richmond in the Victorian Football League (VFL).
