= Bill Tottey =

Australian rules footballer

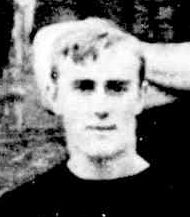

Personal information
- Full name: William Ernest Tottey
- Born: 6 October 1888; South Melbourne, Victoria
- Died: 2 September 1943 (aged 54); Melbourne, Victoria
- Original team: Hawthorn (MJFA)
- Height: 183 cm (6 ft 0 in)
- Weight: 86 kg (190 lb)

Playing career^{1}
Years	Club	Games (Goals)
1908	Melbourne	14 (6)
1909	Richmond	3 (0)
1910–11	St Kilda	12 (6)
Total		29 (12)
- ^{1} Playing statistics correct to the end of 1911.

William Ernest Tottey (6 October 1888 – 2 September 1943) was an Australian rules footballer who played with Melbourne, Richmond and St Kilda in the Victorian Football League (VFL).

== Family ==
The son of Joseph Tottey, and Janet Sarah Tottey, née Winter, William Ernest Tottey was born in South Melbourne on 6 October 1888. He married Ethel May Meighan in 1917.

== Death ==
He died on 2 September 1943 at the Melbourne Hospital.
