= Larry Rowe =

Australian rules footballer

Personal information
- Full name: Larry Rowe
- Born: 10 January 1941
- Died: 18 October 2012 (aged 71)
- Original team: Hampton Scouts
- Height: 182 cm (6 ft 0 in)
- Weight: 80 kg (176 lb)

Playing career^{1}
Years	Club	Games (Goals)
1958–61	Richmond	20 (6)
- ^{1} Playing statistics correct to the end of 1961.

Larry Rowe (10 January 1941 – 18 October 2012) was an Australian rules footballer who played with Richmond in the Victorian Football League (VFL) and Caulfield in the Victorian Football Association (VFA).

Following the end of his VFL career in 1961, Rowe played for and captained Brighton-Caulfield Football Club in the VFA and its successor, Caulfield Football Club. Rowe played 70 matches for Caulfield from 1965 to 1968, all as captain, winning the Jack Field Medal for VFA Second Division Best and Fairest in 1967, Caulfield's Best and Fairest in 1966 and 1967 and Leading Goalkicker in 1965, 1966 and 1967.

== Sources ==
- Piesse, Ken (2010) The Bears Uncensored, Football & Cricket Books: Melbourne. ISBN 9780646528793.
