= Des McKenzie =

Australian rules footballer

Personal information
- Full name: Desmond William McKenzie
- Born: 15 March 1945
- Died: 25 May 2016 (aged 71)
- Height: 185 cm (6 ft 1 in)
- Weight: 89 kg (196 lb)

Playing career^{1}
| Years | Club | Games (Goals) |
| 1968–69 | Richmond | 16 (0) |
- ^{1} Playing statistics correct to the end of 1969.

Desmond William McKenzie (15 March 1945 – 25 May 2016) was an Australian rules footballer who played with Richmond in the Victorian Football League (VFL).
