= Sam Cooke (Australian footballer) =

Australian rules footballer

Personal information
- Full name: Samuel Edward Cooke
- Born: 5 November 1883; Woori Yallock, Victoria
- Died: 23 May 1966 (aged 82); Kerang, Victoria
- Original team: Werribee

Playing career^{1}
Years	Club	Games (Goals)
1909	Richmond	3 (2)
- ^{1} Playing statistics correct to the end of 1909.

Samuel Edward Cooke (5 November 1883 – 23 May 1966) was an Australian rules footballer who played with Richmond in the Victorian Football League (VFL).
