= Bill Nalder =

Australian rules footballer

Personal information
- Full name: William Ernest Nalder
- Born: 14 August 1952 (age 74)
- Original team: Lalbert
- Height: 193 cm (6 ft 4 in)
- Weight: 98 kg (216 lb)

Playing career^{1}
Years	Club	Games (Goals)
1972–73	Richmond	14 (5)
1974	Preston (VFA)	8 (2)
- ^{1} Playing statistics correct to the end of 1974.

Bill Nalder (born 14 August 1952) is a former Australian rules footballer who played with Richmond in the Victorian Football League (VFL).
