= George Rankine =

Australian rules footballer

Personal information
- Full name: George Leopold Rankine
- Born: 4 November 1884; Warrnambool, Victoria
- Died: 26 July 1945 (aged 60); Murray Bridge, South Australia

Playing career^{1}
Years	Club	Games (Goals)
1908	Richmond	2 (0)
- ^{1} Playing statistics correct to the end of 1908.

George Leopold Rankine (4 November 1884 – 26 July 1945), known as "Leo", was an Australian rules footballer who played with Richmond in the Victorian Football League (VFL).

== Family ==
The son of Henry George Rankine, and Eva Anne Rankine, née Crossley, George Leopold Rankine was born at Warrnambool on 4 November 1884.

He married Guelda Delicia Eunice Smith on 11 August 1923. Their son, Bryce Crossley Rankine (1925-2013), B.Sc., M.Sc., D.Sc., was made a Member of the Order of Australia in the 1986 Australia Day Honours for service to wine industry technology and to education.

== Football ==
He played two First XVIII matches for Richmond: against University on 4 July 1908, and against Fitzroy on 11 July 1908.

== After football ==
He was employed for many years as a Government Stock Inspector.

== Death ==
He died on 6 July 1945.
