= Wally Seitz =

Australian rules footballer

Personal information
- Full name: Walter William Seitz
- Born: 14 July 1927
- Died: 26 September 1997 (aged 70)
- Original team: Glen Iris
- Height: 191 cm (6 ft 3 in)
- Weight: 102 kg (225 lb)
- Position: Ruckman

Playing career^{1}
| Years | Club | Games (Goals) |
| 1949 | Richmond | 1 (0) |
| 1950–54 | Yarraville (VFA) | |
- ^{1} Playing statistics correct to the end of 1954.

Walter William Seitz (14 July 1927 – 26 September 1997) was an Australian rules footballer who played with Richmond in the Victorian Football League (VFL).
