= Terry Morrissey =

Australian rules footballer (1944–2020)

Personal information
- Full name: Terry Morrissey
- Born: 7 December 1944
- Died: 29 May 2020 (aged 75); Warrnambool
- Original team: Port Fairy
- Height: 175 cm (5 ft 9 in)
- Weight: 76 kg (168 lb)

Playing career^{1}
| Years | Club | Games (Goals) |
| 1964 | Richmond | 5 (2) |
- ^{1} Playing statistics correct to the end of 1964.

Terry Morrissey (7 December 1944 – 29 May 2020) was an Australian rules footballer who played with Richmond in the Victorian Football League (VFL).
