= Frank Bain =

Australian rules footballer

Personal information
- Full name: Frank Bain
- Born: 10 June 1959 (age 67)
- Original team: Bennetswood
- Height: 187 cm (6 ft 2 in)
- Weight: 78 kg (172 lb)

Playing career^{1}
Years	Club	Games (Goals)
1979	Richmond	2 (0)
- ^{1} Playing statistics correct to the end of 1979.

Frank Bain (born 10 June 1959) is a former Australian rules footballer who played with Richmond in the Victorian Football League (VFL).
