= Max Hood =

Australian rules footballer

Personal information
- Full name: Maxwell William Hood
- Born: 25 July 1925; Richmond, Victoria
- Died: 12 December 2012 (aged 87); Parkville, Victoria
- Original team: Richmond United
- Height: 191 cm (6 ft 3 in)
- Weight: 86 kg (190 lb)

Playing career^{1}
| Years | Club | Games (Goals) |
| 1949 | Richmond | 1 (0) |
| 1950 | Camberwell (VFA) | 4 (2) |
- ^{1} Playing statistics correct to the end of 1949.

Maxwell William Hood (25 July 1925 – 12 December 2012) was an Australian rules footballer who played with Richmond in the Victorian Football League (VFL).
