= Jack Arbrew =

Australian rules footballer

Personal information
- Full name: John Luke Arbrew
- Born: 4 August 1889; Stawell, Victoria
- Died: 31 January 1963 (aged 73); Heidelberg, Victoria
- Original team: Queenscliff Artillery
- Height: 180 cm (5 ft 11 in)
- Weight: 80 kg (176 lb)

Playing career^{1}
Years	Club	Games (Goals)
1909	Geelong	1 (0)
1913–14	Richmond	10 (0)
Total		11 (0)
- ^{1} Playing statistics correct to the end of 1914.

Jack Luke Arbrew (4 August 1889 – 31 January 1963) was an Australian rules footballer who played with Geelong and Richmond in the Victorian Football League (VFL).
