= Frank Twomey (footballer) =

Australian rules footballer

Personal information
- Full name: Francis Patrick Twomey
- Born: 22 January 1890; Richmond, Victoria
- Died: 25 May 1958 (aged 68); Williamstown, Victoria
- Original team: Collingwood Districts

Playing career^{1}
Years	Club	Games (Goals)
1913–14	Richmond	3 (1)
- ^{1} Playing statistics correct to the end of 1914.

Francis Patrick Twomey (22 January 1890 – 25 May 1958) was an Australian rules footballer who played with Richmond in the Victorian Football League (VFL).
