= Alex Salvado =

Australian rules footballer

Personal information
- Full name: Alexander Panteleon Salvado
- Born: 19 October 1890; Richmond, Victoria
- Died: 20 May 1954 (aged 63); Heidelberg, Victoria
- Original team: Northcote
- Height: 178 cm (5 ft 10 in)
- Weight: 80 kg (176 lb)

Playing career^{1}
Years	Club	Games (Goals)
1912	Richmond	1 (2)
1919	Melbourne	5 (2)
Total		6 (4)
- ^{1} Playing statistics correct to the end of 1919.

Alexander Panteleon Salvado (19 October 1890 – 20 May 1954) was an Australian rules footballer who played for the Richmond Football Club and Melbourne Football Club in the Victorian Football League (VFL).
