= Ken McGown =

Australian rules footballer

Personal information
- Full name: Kenneth James McGown
- Born: 22 March 1936
- Died: 16 December 2010 (aged 74)
- Original team: Irymple
- Height: 180 cm (5 ft 11 in)
- Weight: 85 kg (187 lb)

Playing career^{1}
Years	Club	Games (Goals)
1954–56	Richmond	13 (0)
- ^{1} Playing statistics correct to the end of 1956.

Kenneth James McGown (22 March 1936 – 16 December 2010) was an Australian rules footballer who played with Richmond in the Victorian Football League (VFL).
