= Bill Roach (footballer) =

Australian rules footballer

Personal information
- Full name: Charles Roach
- Born: 3 November 1925
- Died: 3 February 2015 (aged 89)
- Original team: Prahran
- Height: 175 cm (5 ft 9 in)
- Weight: 67 kg (148 lb)

Playing career^{1}
Years	Club	Games (Goals)
1946	Richmond	1 (0)
- ^{1} Playing statistics correct to the end of 1946.

Charles Arthur "Bill" Roach (3 November 1925 – 3 February 2015) was an Australian rules footballer who played with Richmond in the Victorian Football League (VFL). Less than two months after playing for Richmond, Roach requested a clearance to Melbourne Football Club, which was granted, but he never played a league game for them.

He played for the Prahran Football Club in the Victorian Football Association, where he was a life member and chairman of selectors from 1965 to 1975.

== Family ==
Charles was married to his late wife of 64 years, Joyce and is survived by daughter Joanne, son Gary and grandchildren Jessica, Andrew, Samuel and Alice.
