= Keith Smythe =

Australian rules footballer

Personal information
- Full name: Keith Smythe
- Born: 9 May 1949 (age 77)
- Original team: Merbein
- Height: 173 cm (5 ft 8 in)
- Weight: 76 kg (168 lb)

Playing career^{1}
Years	Club	Games (Goals)
1968–70	Richmond	15 (8)
1971	St Kilda	11 (5)
Total		26 (13)
- ^{1} Playing statistics correct to the end of 1971.

Keith Smythe (born 9 May 1949) is a former Australian rules footballer who played with Richmond and St Kilda in the Victorian Football League (VFL).
