= Kevin Deagan =

Australian rules footballer

Personal information
- Full name: Kevin James Deagan
- Born: 25 December 1923
- Died: 13 June 1999 (aged 75)
- Original team: RAAF Sydney
- Height: 183 cm (6 ft 0 in)
- Weight: 73 kg (161 lb)

Playing career^{1}
Years	Club	Games (Goals)
1944, 1946	Richmond	5 (3)
1944	Sturt-South	1 (2)
- ^{1} Playing statistics correct to the end of 1946.

Kevin Deagan (25 December 1923 – 13 June 1999) was a former Australian rules footballer who played with Richmond in the Victorian Football League (VFL).
