= Norm Madigan =

Australian rules footballer

Personal information
- Full name: Norm Madigan
- Born: 12 December 1944
- Height: 169 cm (5 ft 7 in)
- Weight: 67 kg (148 lb)

Playing career^{1}
Years	Club	Games (Goals)
1964	Richmond	2 (0)
- ^{1} Playing statistics correct to the end of 1964.

Norm Madigan (born 12 December 1944) is a former Australian rules footballer who played with Richmond in the Victorian Football League (VFL).
