= Wayne Judd =

Australian rules footballer

Personal information
- Full name: Wayne Judd
- Born: 26 October 1948 (age 78)
- Height: 185 cm (6 ft 1 in)
- Weight: 86 kg (190 lb)

Playing career^{1}
Years	Club	Games (Goals)
1969	Richmond	7 (9)
- ^{1} Playing statistics correct to the end of 1969.

Wayne Judd (born 26 October 1948) is a former Australian rules footballer who played with Richmond in the Victorian Football League (VFL).
