= Ron Thomas (footballer) =

Australian rules footballer

Personal information
- Full name: Ron Thomas
- Born: 4 October 1948 (age 78)
- Original team: Mitcham
- Height: 185 cm (6 ft 1 in)
- Weight: 83 kg (183 lb)

Playing career^{1}
Years	Club	Games (Goals)
1969–70	Richmond	11 (0)
- ^{1} Playing statistics correct to the end of 1970.

Ron Thomas (born 4 October 1948) is a former Australian rules footballer who played with Richmond in the Victorian Football League (VFL).
