= Basil Moloney =

Australian rules footballer

Personal information
- Full name: Basil Moloney
- Born: 10 February 1941 (age 85)
- Original team: Warracknabeal
- Height: 178 cm (5 ft 10 in)
- Weight: 77 kg (170 lb)

Playing career^{1}
Years	Club	Games (Goals)
1961–1963	Richmond	21 (3)
- ^{1} Playing statistics correct to the end of 1963.

Basil Moloney (born 10 February 1941) is a former Australian rules footballer who played for the Richmond Football Club in the Victorian Football League (VFL).
