= Bill Lynch (footballer) =

Australian rules footballer

Personal information
- Full name: William David Lynch
- Born: 15 February 1892; Richmond, Victoria
- Died: 9 November 1947 (aged 55); Beechworth, Victoria
- Original team: Tramways

Playing career^{1}
Years	Club	Games (Goals)
1912	Richmond	1 (0)
- ^{1} Playing statistics correct to the end of 1912.

William David Lynch (15 February 1892 – 9 November 1947) was an Australian rules footballer who played with Richmond in the Victorian Football League (VFL).
