= Allan Granger =

Australian rules footballer

Personal information
- Full name: Allan Granger
- Born: 29 July 1894; Richmond, Victoria
- Died: 27 December 1957 (aged 63); Brunswick, Victoria
- Original team: St Ignatius

Playing career^{1}
Years	Club	Games (Goals)
1914–1915	Richmond	11 (11)
- ^{1} Playing statistics correct to the end of 1915.

Allan Granger (29 July 1894 – 27 December 1957) was an Australian rules footballer who played for the Richmond Football Club in the Victorian Football League (VFL).
