= Kevin Fitzgerald (Australian footballer) =

Australian rules footballer

Personal information
- Full name: Kevin Fitzgerald
- Born: 19 February 1943
- Original team: Ararat
- Height: 175 cm (5 ft 9 in)
- Weight: 67 kg (148 lb)

Playing career^{1}
Years	Club	Games (Goals)
1961	Richmond	1 (0)
- ^{1} Playing statistics correct to the end of 1961.

Kevin Fitzgerald (born 19 February 1943) is a former Australian rules footballer who played with Richmond in the Victorian Football League (VFL).
