= Harry Maynard (footballer) =

Australian rules footballer

Personal information
- Full name: Henry Verney Maynard
- Born: 17 May 1890; South Melbourne, Victoria
- Died: 20 October 1947 (aged 57); Sale, Victoria

Playing career^{1}
Years	Club	Games (Goals)
1914	Richmond	2 (0)
- ^{1} Playing statistics correct to the end of 1914.

Henry Verney Maynard (17 May 1890 – 20 October 1947) was an Australian rules footballer who played with Richmond in the Victorian Football League (VFL).
