= Darryl Beale =

Australian rules footballer (born 1947)

Personal information
- Full name: Darryl Beale
- Born: 23 June 1947 (age 79)
- Original team: Yarrawonga
- Height: 187 cm (6 ft 2 in)
- Weight: 89 kg (196 lb)

Playing career^{1}
Years	Club	Games (Goals)
1968	Richmond	10 (0)
- ^{1} Playing statistics correct to the end of 1968.

Darryl Beale (born 23 June 1947) is a former Australian rules footballer who played with Richmond in the Victorian Football League (VFL) and Central District in the South Australian National Football League (SANFL).
