= Stan O'Connell =

Australian rules footballer

Personal information
- Full name: Walter John Stanley O'Connell
- Born: 29 April 1883; Prahran, Victoria
- Died: 5 January 1921 (aged 37); Hawthorn, Victoria

Playing career^{1}
Years	Club	Games (Goals)
1908	Richmond	5 (3)
- ^{1} Playing statistics correct to the end of 1908.

Walter John Stanley O'Connell (29 April 1883 – 5 January 1921) was an Australian rules footballer who played with Richmond in the Victorian Football League (VFL).
