= Harry Stokesberry =

Australian rules footballer

Personal information
- Full name: William Henry Stokesberry
- Born: 30 March 1896; West Melbourne, Victoria
- Died: 5 May 1981 (aged 85); Queensland

Playing career^{1}
Years	Club	Games (Goals)
1915	Richmond	1 (0)
- ^{1} Playing statistics correct to the end of 1915.

William Henry Stokesberry (30 March 1896 – 5 May 1981) was an Australian rules footballer.

== Family ==
The son of the talented boxer, respected referee, and Richmond trainer, Joseph Allwood "Joe" Stokesberry (1872-1952), and Ellen "Nellie" Stokesberry (1875-1967), née Lewis, William Henry Stokesberry was born in West Melbourne, Victoria on 30 March 1896.

== Football ==
Stokesberry played one match during the 1915 season for Richmond in the Victorian Football League:

He was a centre-half-forward whose only club game was as a last minute replacement when Richmond were short of players.
