= Alan Maple =

Australian rules footballer, born 1917

Personal information
- Full name: Alan Maple
- Born: 12 April 1917
- Died: 28 May 2006 (aged 89)
- Height: 183 cm (6 ft 0 in)
- Weight: 80 kg (176 lb)

Playing career^{1}
Years	Club	Games (Goals)
1937	Richmond	3 (3)
- ^{1} Playing statistics correct to the end of 1937.

Alan Maple (12 April 1917 – 28 May 2006) was an Australian rules footballer who played for the Richmond Football Club in the Victorian Football League (VFL).
