= Lloyd French (footballer) =

Australian rules footballer

Personal information
- Full name: Lloyd French
- Born: 22 December 1947 (age 78)
- Original team: Scottsdale
- Height: 185 cm (6 ft 1 in)
- Weight: 83 kg (183 lb)

Playing career^{1}
Years	Club	Games (Goals)
1970–71	Richmond	3 (2)
- ^{1} Playing statistics correct to the end of 1971.

Lloyd French (born 22 December 1947) is a former Australian rules footballer who played with Richmond in the Victorian Football League (VFL).

French began his playing career with Scottsdale in the NTFA and was a member of that club's 1968 premiership team. He also won the club Best and Fairest award that year.
