= Colin Dobson (Australian footballer) =

Australian rules footballer

Personal information
- Full name: Colin Dobson
- Born: 24 March 1945
- Original team: Oakleigh YCW
- Height: 193 cm (6 ft 4 in)
- Weight: 83 kg (183 lb)

Playing career^{1}
Years	Club	Games (Goals)
1964	Richmond	1 (0)
- ^{1} Playing statistics correct to the end of 1964.

Colin Dobson (born 24 March 1945) is a former Australian rules footballer who played with Richmond in the Victorian Football League (VFL).
