= Leo McCulloch =

Australian rules footballer

Personal information
- Full name: William Leroy John McCulloch
- Born: 31 May 1896; Mirboo North, Victoria
- Died: 31 July 1971 (aged 75); Melbourne
- Original team: Richmond Tramways
- Height: 180 cm (5 ft 11 in)

Playing career^{1}
Years	Club	Games (Goals)
1918	Richmond	3 (1)
1926	Hawthorn	1 (0)
Total		4 (1)
- ^{1} Playing statistics correct to the end of 1926.

William Leroy John "Leo" McCulloch (31 May 1896 – 31 July 1971) was an Australian rules footballer who played with Richmond and Hawthorn in the Victorian Football League (VFL).

== Family ==
The second of five children born to William Andrew John McCulloch (1874–1950) and Anne Monica McCarthy (1870–1917), William Leroy John McCulloch was born at Mirboo North on 31 May 1896.

== Football ==
Leo McCulloch grew up in the Richmond area and commenced his football career playing for the Richmond Depot Tramways team. He played three games for Richmond during the 1918 VFL season and was described as a "heavy chap" who did fairly well but soon returned to junior football.

Eight years later, in 1926 McCulloch transferred to Hawthorn from Caulfield but only made a single appearance in Round 17 after spending most of the season in the reserves.

== Later life ==
Leo McCulloch worked for the Tramways and then in the CUB Brewery until he retired a few years before his death in 1971. He is interred at Fawkner Memorial Park.
