= Jack Uwins =

Australian rules footballer, born 1913

Personal information
- Full name: Jack Uwins
- Born: 4 September 1913
- Died: 16 February 1998 (aged 84)
- Original team: Richmond City
- Height: 178 cm (5 ft 10 in)
- Weight: 80 kg (176 lb)

Playing career^{1}
| Years | Club | Games (Goals) |
| 1937 | Richmond | 6 (0) |
- ^{1} Playing statistics correct to the end of 1937.

Jack Uwins (4 September 1913 – 16 February 1998) was a former Australian rules footballer who played with Richmond in the Victorian Football League (VFL).
