= Jim Lacey (footballer) =

Australian rules footballer (1887–1956)

Personal information
- Full name: James John Lacey
- Born: 22 November 1887; Richmond, Victoria
- Died: 9 April 1956 (aged 68); Melbourne, Victoria

Playing career^{1}
Years	Club	Games (Goals)
1907	South Melbourne	1 (0)
1910	Richmond	4 (2)
Total		5 (2)
- ^{1} Playing statistics correct to the end of 1910.

James John Lacey (22 November 1887 – 9 April 1956) was an Australian rules footballer who played with South Melbourne and Richmond in the Victorian Football League (VFL).
