= Noel Jenkinson =

Australian rules footballer

Personal information
- Full name: Noel Jenkinson
- Born: 18 March 1957 (age 69)
- Original team: Red Cliffs
- Height: 185 cm (6 ft 1 in)
- Weight: 102 kg (225 lb)
- Position: Fullback

Playing career^{1}
Years	Club	Games (Goals)
1975–79	Richmond	57 (0)
1980–81	South Melbourne	6 (0)
Total		63 (0)
- ^{1} Playing statistics correct to the end of 1981.

Noel Jenkinson (born 18 March 1957) is a former Australian rules footballer who played with Richmond and South Melbourne in the Victorian Football League (VFL).
