= Bill Beckwith (footballer) =

Australian rules footballer (born 1954)

Personal information
- Full name: William Beckwith
- Born: 31 May 1954 (age 72); Mentone
- Original team: Chadstone
- Height: 175 cm (5 ft 9 in)
- Weight: 75 kg (165 lb)
- Position: Rover / forward pocket

Playing career^{1}
Years	Club	Games (Goals)
1971–72	Richmond	10 (8)
- ^{1} Playing statistics correct to the end of 1972.

William Beckwith (born 31 May 1954) is a former Australian rules footballer who played with Richmond in the Victorian Football League (VFL).

Beckwith was a highly talented rover and forward-pocket who played his first senior game with Richmond as a 16-year-old, one of the youngest players ever in the VFL. He joined the Richmond Under 19 team in 1970 where he was the leading goal kicker in their premiership winning season. He then went through the next 2 seasons, 1971–1973, to play 40 games for the Reserves, kicking 71 goals, and 10 games for the Seniors kicking 8 goals.

He left Richmond during the 1973 season, going on to play six seasons with Port Melbourne in the Victorian Football Association (VFA), where he was a member of their 1974 Premiership side.

Bill went on to play at Highett FC in the Federal Football League under the coaching of former Port Melbourne tough man George Allen. Bill was unlucky to miss the 1979 premiership side due to injury.
