= Reg Fisher (footballer) =

Australian rules footballer

Personal information
- Full name: Reg Fisher
- Born: 31 August 1932
- Died: 3 June 2011 (aged 78)
- Original team: University Blacks
- Height: 180 cm (5 ft 11 in)
- Weight: 84 kg (185 lb)

Playing career^{1}
Years	Club	Games (Goals)
1953	Richmond	4 (2)
1957	Geelong	1 (0)
Total		5 (2)
- ^{1} Playing statistics correct to the end of 1957.

Reg Fisher (31 August 1932 – 3 June 2011) was a former Australian rules footballer who played with Richmond and Geelong in the Victorian Football League (VFL).
