= Michael McKenna (Australian footballer) =

Australian rules footballer

Personal information
- Full name: Michael McKenna
- Born: 4 April 1961 (age 65)
- Original team: Beaconsfield
- Height: 171 cm (5 ft 7 in)
- Weight: 71 kg (157 lb)
- Position: Rover / Utility

Playing career^{1}
Years	Club	Games (Goals)
1979–84	Footscray	80 (45)
1985	Richmond	22 (10)
Total		102 (55)
- ^{1} Playing statistics correct to the end of 1985.

Michael McKenna (born 4 April 1961) is a former Australian rules footballer who played with Footscray and Richmond in the Victorian Football League (VFL).
