= Herb Woodhead =

Australian rules footballer

Personal information
- Full name: Herbert Kirkland Woodhead
- Born: 2 April 1888; Richmond, Victoria
- Died: 16 June 1961 (aged 73); Sydney, New South Wales
- Original team: Richmond Juniors

Playing career^{1}
| Years | Club | Games (Goals) |
| 1910–12 | Richmond | 7 (0) |
- ^{1} Playing statistics correct to the end of 1912.

Herbert Kirkland Woodhead (2 April 1888 – 16 June 1961) was an Australian rules footballer who played with Richmond in the Victorian Football League (VFL).
