= Arthur Danks =

Australian rules footballer

Personal information
- Full name: Arthur Beethoven Danks
- Born: 5 September 1891; Port Melbourne, Victoria
- Died: 25 December 1964 (aged 73); Brighton, Victoria
- Height: 173 cm (5 ft 8 in)
- Weight: 73 kg (161 lb)

Playing career^{1}
| Years | Club | Games (Goals) |
| 1912–1915 | Richmond | 48 (2) |
- ^{1} Playing statistics correct to the end of 1915.

Arthur Beethoven Danks (5 September 1891 – 25 December 1964) was an Australian rules footballer who played for the Richmond Football Club in the Victorian Football League (VFL). Danks served in the Australian Imperial Force between 12 August 1915 and 4 August 1919.
