= Geoff McMillan =

Australian rules footballer

Personal information
- Full name: Geoff Leigh McMillan
- Born: 22 May 1958
- Died: 25 December 2001 (aged 43)
- Original team: Nandaly
- Height: 188 cm (6 ft 2 in)
- Weight: 86 kg (190 lb)

Playing career^{1}
Years	Club	Games (Goals)
1978–79	Richmond	11 (5)
1980	Norwood	1 (0)
Total		12 (5)
- ^{1} Playing statistics correct to the end of 1980.

Geoff Leigh McMillan (22 May 1958 – 25 December 2001) was a former Australian rules footballer who played with Richmond in the Victorian Football League (VFL).

In 1980 he moved to play for Norwood in the South Australian National Football League, but only played a single game before injury prevented him from further games.

He died in 2001 from a brain tumour.
