= Bill Carrick (footballer) =

Australian rules footballer

Personal information
- Full name: Bill Carrick
- Born: 23 November 1934
- Original team: Richmond Districts
- Height: 187 cm (6 ft 2 in)
- Weight: 79 kg (174 lb)

Playing career^{1}
Years	Club	Games (Goals)
1956	Richmond	5 (5)
- ^{1} Playing statistics correct to the end of 1956.

Bill Carrick (born 23 November 1934) is a former Australian rules footballer who played with Richmond in the Victorian Football League (VFL).

A full-forward, Carrick only played 5 games in his three seasons at Richmond, but did play in Richmond's 1955 Reserves' Premiership team. He later played for the Ballarat and Box Hill Football Clubs.
