= Ron Serich =

Australian rules footballer

Personal information
- Full name: Ronald Boris Serich
- Born: 18 June 1940; Broken Hill, New South Wales
- Died: 28 May 2009 (aged 68)
- Original team: South Broken Hill
- Height: 180 cm (5 ft 11 in)
- Weight: 83 kg (183 lb)
- Position: Forward

Playing career^{1}
Years	Club	Games (Goals)
1961–63	Richmond	28 (36)
- ^{1} Playing statistics correct to the end of 1963.

Ronald Boris Serich (18 June 1940 – 28 May 2009) was an Australian rules footballer who played with Richmond in the Victorian Football League (VFL).
