= Len Mitchell =

Australian rules footballer

Personal information
- Full name: Len Mitchell
- Born: 29 May 1935
- Died: 1 May 2006 (aged 70)
- Height: 185 cm (6 ft 1 in)
- Weight: 96 kg (212 lb)

Playing career^{1}
Years	Club	Games (Goals)
1957	Richmond	6 (1)
- ^{1} Playing statistics correct to the end of 1957.

Len Mitchell (29 May 1935 – 1 May 2006) was a former Australian rules footballer who played with Richmond in the Victorian Football League (VFL).
