= Arthur Birtles =

Australian rules footballer

Personal information
- Full name: Arthur Albert Rowden Birtles
- Born: 21 July 1899; South Yarra, Victoria
- Died: 30 January 1975 (aged 75); Heidelberg, Victoria
- Original team: Burnley
- Height: 178 cm (5 ft 10 in)
- Weight: 62 kg (137 lb)

Playing career^{1}
Years	Club	Games (Goals)
1922	Richmond	5 (5)
- ^{1} Playing statistics correct to the end of 1922.

Arthur Albert Rowden Birtles (21 July 1899 – 30 January 1975) was an Australian rules footballer who played for the Richmond Football Club in the Victorian Football League (VFL).
