= Vern Moore (footballer) =

Australian rules footballer

Personal information
- Full name: Edward Vernon Moore
- Born: 11 May 1895; St Kilda, Victoria
- Died: 4 June 1955 (aged 60); Malvern, Victoria
- Original team: Prahran

Playing career^{1}
Years	Club	Games (Goals)
1922–24	Melbourne	14 (8)
1925	Richmond	4 (1)
Total		18 (9)
- ^{1} Playing statistics correct to the end of 1925.

Edward Vernon Moore (11 May 1895 – 4 June 1955) was an Australian rules footballer who played with Melbourne and Richmond in the Victorian Football League (VFL).
