= Stan Wilson (footballer, born 1928) =

Australian rules footballer

Personal information
- Full name: Stan Wilson
- Born: 23 January 1928
- Died: 24 January 2002 (aged 74)
- Height: 177 cm (5 ft 10 in)
- Weight: 76 kg (168 lb)

Playing career^{1}
Years	Club	Games (Goals)
1949	Richmond	6 (2)
- ^{1} Playing statistics correct to the end of 1949.

Stan Wilson (23 January 1928 – 24 January 2002) was an Australian rules footballer who played with Richmond in the Victorian Football League (VFL).
