= Bill Albress =

Australian rules footballer

Personal information
- Full name: William Albress
- Born: 13 October 1897; Tootgarook, Victoria
- Died: 23 June 1961 (aged 63); Fitzroy, Victoria
- Original team: Richmond Districts
- Height: 180 cm (5 ft 11 in)
- Weight: 83 kg (183 lb)

Playing career^{1}
Years	Club	Games (Goals)
1917–18	Richmond	8 (6)
- ^{1} Playing statistics correct to the end of 1918.

Bill Albress (13 October 1897 – 23 June 1961) was an Australian rules footballer who played with Richmond in the Victorian Football League (VFL).
