= Rodney Evans (footballer) =

Australian rules footballer

Personal information
- Full name: Rodney Evans
- Born: 2 January 1946 (age 80)
- Original team: Edithvale-Aspendale
- Height: 178 cm (5 ft 10 in)
- Weight: 76 kg (168 lb)

Playing career^{1}
Years	Club	Games (Goals)
1963–64	Richmond	11 (0)
- ^{1} Playing statistics correct to the end of 1964.

Rodney Evans (born 2 January 1946) is a former Australian rules footballer who played with Richmond in the Victorian Football League (VFL).
