= Johnny MacGregor =

Australian rules footballer

Personal information
- Full name: John Murray MacGregor
- Born: 3 December 1889; East Melbourne, Victoria
- Died: 16 May 1966 (aged 76); Dunkirk, France
- Height: 169 cm (5 ft 7 in)
- Weight: 64 kg (141 lb)

Playing career^{1}
Years	Club	Games (Goals)
1911	Richmond	4 (0)
- ^{1} Playing statistics correct to the end of 1911.

John Murray MacGregor (3 December 1889 – 16 May 1966) was an Australian rules footballer who played with Richmond in the Victorian Football League (VFL).
