= John Claxton =

Australian rules footballer

Personal information
- Full name: John Maldon Claxton
- Born: 4 November 1934
- Died: 22 December 2015 (aged 81)
- Original team: Richmond YCW
- Height: 177 cm (5 ft 10 in)
- Weight: 83 kg (183 lb)

Playing career^{1}
Years	Club	Games (Goals)
1955–56	Richmond	15 (18)
1958–61	Port Melbourne (VFA)	59 (110)
- ^{1} Playing statistics correct to the end of 1961.

John Maldon Claxton (4 November 1934 – 22 December 2015) was an Australian rules footballer who played with Richmond in the Victorian Football League (VFL).

== Football career ==
John was recruited from local Richmond YCW, a junior club. Claxton who played on the half-forward-flank, spent just over six seasons with Richmond and was a member of the Reserves’ 1954 and 1955 Premiership sides. In 1957 he moved to East Launceston for one year, before returning to play with Port Melbourne (VFA) in 1958. He moved on to Caulfield (VFA) for two seasons before playing in the Federal FL. He was Noble Park Captain/Coach 1964 and Glen Iris Captain/Coach 1965.
