= Victor Heath =

Australian rules footballer

Personal information
- Full name: Victor Heath
- Born: 26 July 1890
- Died: 12 June 1964 (aged 73)
- Original team: Beverley

Playing career^{1}
Years	Club	Games (Goals)
1917	Richmond	3 (0)
- ^{1} Playing statistics correct to the end of 1917.

Victor Heath (26 July 1890 – 12 June 1964) was an Australian rules footballer who played with Richmond in the Victorian Football League (VFL).
