= Ray Orchard =

Australian rules footballer

Personal information
- Full name: Raymond Edward Orchard
- Born: 9 August 1946 (age 80)
- Original team: Langwarrin
- Height: 194 cm (6 ft 4 in)
- Weight: 94 kg (207 lb)

Playing career^{1}
Years	Club	Games (Goals)
1966–68	Richmond	8 (2)
- ^{1} Playing statistics correct to the end of 1968.

Raymond Edward Orchard (born 9 August 1946) is a former Australian rules footballer who played with Richmond in the Victorian Football League (VFL).
