= Trevor Larkins =

Australian rules footballer

Personal information
- Full name: Trevor Larkins
- Born: 6 August 1963 (age 63)
- Original team: Swan Hill
- Height: 177 cm (5 ft 10 in)
- Weight: 77 kg (170 lb)

Playing career^{1}
Years	Club	Games (Goals)
1985	Richmond	4 (4)
- ^{1} Playing statistics correct to the end of 1985.

Trevor Larkins (born 6 August 1963) is a former Australian rules footballer who played with Richmond in the Victorian Football League (VFL).
