= Ron Dean (footballer, born 1943) =

Australian rules footballer

Personal information
- Full name: Ron Dean
- Born: 29 September 1943 (age 83)
- Original team: Mordialloc
- Height: 178 cm (5 ft 10 in)
- Weight: 76 kg (168 lb)

Playing career^{1}
Years	Club	Games (Goals)
1962	Richmond	2 (1)
- ^{1} Playing statistics correct to the end of 1962.

Ron Dean (born 29 September 1943) is a former Australian rules footballer who played with Richmond in the Victorian Football League (VFL).
