= Robert Duncan (footballer) =

Australian rules footballer

Personal information
- Full name: Robert Duncan
- Born: 27 November 1891; Kew, Victoria
- Died: 9 November 1984 (aged 92); Prahran, Victoria
- Original team: Beverley
- Height: 179 cm (5 ft 10 in)
- Weight: 84 kg (185 lb)

Playing career^{1}
Years	Club	Games (Goals)
1909	Richmond	1 (0)
- ^{1} Playing statistics correct to the end of 1909.

Robert Duncan (27 November 1891 – 9 November 1984) was a former Australian rules footballer who played with Richmond in the Victorian Football League (VFL).
