= Robert Fuller (footballer) =

Australian rules footballer

Personal information
- Full name: Robert Fuller
- Born: 21 October 1964 (age 62)
- Original team: Scotch College
- Height: 185 cm (6 ft 1 in)
- Weight: 77 kg (170 lb)

Playing career^{1}
Years	Club	Games (Goals)
1984	Richmond	4 (1)
- ^{1} Playing statistics correct to the end of 1984.

Robert Fuller (born 21 October 1964) is a former Australian rules footballer who played with Richmond in the Victorian Football League (VFL). Fuller was recruited from Forest Hill in Richmond's suburban zone. He commenced in the Tiger's scholarship squad as a 15 year old, progressing through the U19s and Reserves. He vice-captained the Richmond U19 team and won a Best & Fairest in the Reserves, making his debut in Richmond's senior team at 19. After leaving Richmond he had an impressive career in the VAFA where he was selected in the Victorian representative team for 10 consecutive years and played a record number of 24 games for the Big V. He captained the Victorian team for 7 years and captained the All-Australian team on five occasions. Post-football, Fuller relocated to the Caribbean in the late 90s where he has been a School Principal in the Bahamas, Barbados, and the British Virgin Islands for the past 25 years.
