= Lyster Kirkpatrick =

Australian rules footballer

Personal information
- Full name: Lyster Adam Kirkpatrick
- Born: 11 July 1885; Mornington, Victoria
- Died: 20 November 1921 (aged 36); Brunswick, Victoria

Playing career^{1}
Years	Club	Games (Goals)
1909	Richmond	3 (0)
- ^{1} Playing statistics correct to the end of 1909.

Lyster Adam Kirkpatrick (11 July 1885 – 20 November 1921) was an Australian rules footballer who played with Richmond in the Victorian Football League (VFL).
