= Russell Tully =

Australian rules footballer (1949–2013)

Personal information
- Full name: Russell Tully
- Born: 30 September 1949
- Died: 2 February 2013 (aged 63)
- Original team: Oakleigh
- Height: 192 cm (6 ft 4 in)
- Weight: 86 kg (190 lb)

Playing career^{1}
Years	Club	Games (Goals)
1968	Richmond	1 (0)
- ^{1} Playing statistics correct to the end of 1968.

Russell Tully (30 September 1949 – 2 February 2013) was an Australian rules footballer who played with Richmond in the Victorian Football League (VFL).
