= Len Park =

Australian rules footballer

Personal information
- Full name: Len Park
- Born: 7 February 1944
- Original team: Chelsea
- Height: 174 cm (5 ft 9 in)
- Weight: 71 kg (157 lb)

Playing career^{1}
Years	Club	Games (Goals)
1962	Richmond	2 (0)
- ^{1} Playing statistics correct to the end of 1962.

Len Park (born 7 February 1944) is a former Australian rules footballer who played with Richmond in the Victorian Football League (VFL).
