= Ross Warner (footballer) =

Australian rules footballer

Personal information
- Full name: Ross Warner
- Born: 2 August 1944 (age 82)
- Original team: Bairnsdale
- Height: 193 cm (6 ft 4 in)
- Weight: 86 kg (190 lb)
- Position: Utility

Playing career^{1}
Years	Club	Games (Goals)
1963–67	Richmond	49 (45)
- ^{1} Playing statistics correct to the end of 1967.

Ross Warner (born 2 August 1944) is a former Australian rules footballer who played with Richmond in the Victorian Football League (VFL).
