= Ray Stewart (Australian footballer) =

Australian rules footballer (1892–1966)

Personal information
- Full name: Ray Stewart
- Born: 23 February 1892
- Died: 30 March 1966 (aged 74)
- Original team: Williamstown (VFA)
- Height: 180 cm (5 ft 11 in)
- Weight: 76 kg (168 lb)

Playing career^{1}
| Years | Club | Games (Goals) |
| 1915–18 | Richmond | 30 (0) |
| 1918–19 | Carlton | 8 (1) |
| Total | | 38 (1) |
- ^{1} Playing statistics correct to the end of 1919.

Ray Stewart (23 February 1892 – 30 March 1966) was an Australian rules footballer who played with Richmond and Carlton in the Victorian Football League (VFL).
