= Joe McKenzie =

Australian rules footballer (1889–1968)

Personal information
- Full name: Joseph Butler McKenzie
- Born: 23 April 1889; Port Melbourne, Victoria
- Died: 15 August 1968 (aged 79); Ballarat, Victoria
- Height: 174 cm (5 ft 9 in)
- Weight: 79.5 kg (175 lb)

Playing career^{1}
Years	Club	Games (Goals)
1910	Richmond	6 (1)
- ^{1} Playing statistics correct to the end of 1910.

Joseph Butler McKenzie (23 April 1889 – 15 August 1968) was an Australian rules footballer who played with Richmond in the Victorian Football League (VFL).
