= Jack Cronk =

Australian rules footballer

Personal information
- Full name: John Edward James Cronk
- Born: 10 September 1890; Richmond, Victoria
- Died: 26 September 1964 (aged 74); Bonbeach, Victoria
- Original team: Balmain

Playing career^{1}
Years	Club	Games (Goals)
1914–17	Richmond	23 (11)
- ^{1} Playing statistics correct to the end of 1917.

John Edward James Cronk (10 September 1890 – 26 September 1964) was an Australian rules footballer who played with Richmond in the Victorian Football League (VFL).
