= Phillip Bottams =

Australian rules footballer

Personal information
- Full name: Phillip Bottams
- Born: 24 August 1957 (age 69)
- Original team: Mildura Imperials
- Height: 180 cm (5 ft 11 in)
- Weight: 79 kg (174 lb)

Playing career^{1}
Years	Club	Games (Goals)
1978–81	Richmond	26 (4)
- ^{1} Playing statistics correct to the end of 1981.

Phillip Bottams (born 24 August 1957) is a former Australian rules footballer, who played with Richmond in the Victorian Football League (VFL).

Bottams was a member of Richmond's 1975 VFL Under 19 premiership.
