= Bill Henderson (Australian rules footballer) =

Australian rules footballer (1887–1956)

Personal information
- Full name: William Charles Henderson
- Born: 14 December 1887; Port Melbourne, Victoria
- Died: 17 April 1956 (aged 68); Armadale, Victoria
- Original team: North Melbourne Juniors
- Position: Back-pocket

Playing career^{1}
Years	Club	Games (Goals)
1909	Richmond (VFL)	5 (1)
1910–11	Melbourne (VFL)	14 (0)
1913–14	Brighton (VFA)	27 (7)
Total		46 (8)
- ^{1} Playing statistics correct to the end of 1914.

William Charles Henderson (14 December 1887 – 17 April 1956) was an Australian rules footballer who played with Richmond and Melbourne in the Victorian Football League (VFL).

== Family ==
The son of Edgar John Dean Henderson (1860–1895), and Julia Theresa Henderson (1861–1947), née Burke, (later Mrs. James Williamson), William Charles Henderson was born at Port Melbourne, Victoria on 14 December 1887.

He married Naomi Mina "Omie" Coventry (1888–1953) in 1911.

== Football ==
=== Melbourne (VFL) ===
Cleared from Richmond to Melbourne on 25 May 1910.

=== Brighton (VFA) ===
Cleared from Melbourne in April 1913, Henderson played for Brighton in the VFA for two seasons: 1913 (14 games), and 1914 (13 games).

== Death ==
He died on 17 April 1956.
