= Cedric MacLeod =

Australian rules footballer

Personal information
- Full name: Cedric James Gordon MacLeod
- Born: 26 November 1899; Semaphore, South Australia
- Died: 4 December 1967 (aged 68); Gold Coast, Queensland
- Original team: Semaphore Central

Playing career^{1}
Years	Club	Games (Goals)
1923	Richmond	2 (0)
1923–24	Footscray (VFA)	10 (1)
1924–26	Prahran (VFA)	31 (1)
- ^{1} Playing statistics correct to the end of 1926.

Cedric James Gordon MacLeod (26 November 1899 – 4 December 1967) was an Australian rules footballer who played with Richmond in the Victorian Football League (VFL).
