= Ray McGaw =

Australian rules footballer

Personal information
- Full name: Ray McGaw
- Born: 3 October 1937
- Died: 27 October 2001 (aged 64)
- Original team: Brunswick Stars / St Ignatious
- Height: 175 cm (5 ft 9 in)
- Weight: 67 kg (148 lb)

Playing career^{1}
Years	Club	Games (Goals)
1956–58	Richmond	12 (0)
- ^{1} Playing statistics correct to the end of 1958.

Ray McGaw (3 October 1937 – 27 October 2001) was a former Australian rules footballer who played with Richmond in the Victorian Football League (VFL).
