= Brett Mahony =

Australian rules footballer

Personal information
- Full name: Brett Mahony
- Born: 4 April 1970 (age 56)
- Original teams: De La Salle, (VAFA)

Playing career^{1}
Years	Club	Games (Goals)
1989	Richmond	2 (0)
- ^{1} Playing statistics correct to the end of 1989.

Brett Mahony (born 4 April 1970) is a former Australian rules footballer who played two games for Richmond in the Victorian Football League (VFL) in 1989. He was recruited from the De La Salle in the Victorian Amateur Football Association (VAFA).
