= Peter Sherman =

Australian rules footballer

Personal information
- Full name: Peter Seaton Sherman
- Born: 8 June 1925; Melbourne, Victoria
- Died: 30 July 2008 (aged 83)
- Original team: East Malvern
- Height: 183 cm (6 ft 0 in)
- Weight: 83 kg (183 lb)

Playing career^{1}
Years	Club	Games (Goals)
1947	Richmond	2 (0)
1949	St Kilda	7 (3)
Total		9 (3)
- ^{1} Playing statistics correct to the end of 1949.

Peter Seaton Sherman (8 June 1925 – 30 July 2008) was an Australian rules footballer who played with Richmond and St Kilda in the Victorian Football League (VFL).

Prior to his football career, Sherman served in the Royal Australian Navy during the later years of World War II.
