= Kevin Callander =

Australian rules footballer

Personal information
- Full name: Kevin Callander
- Born: 18 June 1940
- Died: 9 July 2013 (aged 73)
- Original team: St Ignatius
- Height: 179 cm (5 ft 10 in)
- Weight: 69 kg (152 lb)

Playing career^{1}
Years	Club	Games (Goals)
1961–62	Richmond	7 (1)
- ^{1} Playing statistics correct to the end of 1962.

Kevin Callander (18 June 1940 – 9 July 2013) was a former Australian rules footballer who played with Richmond in the Victorian Football League (VFL).
