= Tony Murphy (Australian footballer) =

Australian rules footballer

Personal information
- Full name: Tony Murphy
- Born: 13 September 1940
- Height: 168 cm (5 ft 6 in)
- Weight: 70 kg (154 lb)

Playing career^{1}
Years	Club	Games (Goals)
1960	Richmond	3 (1)
- ^{1} Playing statistics correct to the end of 1960.

Tony Murphy (born 13 September 1940) is a former Australian rules footballer who played with Richmond in the Victorian Football League (VFL).
