= Ian Slockwitch =

Australian rules footballer

Personal information
- Full name: Ian Slockwitch
- Born: 6 October 1941
- Died: 23 August 2017 (aged 75)
- Original teams: St Pat's, Ballarat
- Height: 168 cm (5 ft 6 in)
- Weight: 68 kg (150 lb)

Playing career^{1}
Years	Club	Games (Goals)
1961	Richmond	2 (0)
- ^{1} Playing statistics correct to the end of 1961.

Ian Slockwitch (6 October 1941 – 23 August 2017) was an Australian rules footballer who played with Richmond in the Victorian Football League (VFL).
