= Fred Larkin =

Australian rules footballer (1888–1969)

Personal information
- Full name: Frederick Richard Larkin
- Born: 21 March 1888; Beechworth, Victoria
- Died: 22 August 1969 (aged 81); Albury, New South Wales
- Original team: Ballarat

Playing career^{1}
Years	Club	Games (Goals)
1908	Richmond	2 (0)
- ^{1} Playing statistics correct to the end of 1908.

Frederick Richard Larkin (21 March 1888 – 22 August 1969) was an Australian rules footballer who played with Richmond in the Victorian Football League (VFL).

Recruited from Ballarat.
