= Ern Hill =

Australian rules footballer

Personal information
- Full name: Ernest Arthur Hill
- Born: 31 March 1890; Richmond, Victoria
- Died: 17 July 1943 (aged 53); Prahran, Victoria
- Height: 175 cm (5 ft 9 in)
- Weight: 73 kg (161 lb)

Playing career^{1}
Years	Club	Games (Goals)
1909	Richmond	2 (1)
- ^{1} Playing statistics correct to the end of 1909.

Ernest Arthur Hill (31 March 1890 – 17 July 1943) was an Australian rules footballer who played with Richmond in the Victorian Football League (VFL).
