= Gerry Sier =

Australian rules footballer

Personal information
- Full name: Gerard John Sier
- Born: 4 June 1928
- Died: 13 April 2006 (aged 77)
- Original teams: CBC St Thomas, Clifton Hill
- Height: 180 cm (5 ft 11 in)
- Weight: 89 kg (196 lb)

Playing career^{1}
Years	Club	Games (Goals)
1948–49	Fitzroy	10 (0)
1950	Richmond	7 (0)
Total		17 (0)
- ^{1} Playing statistics correct to the end of 1950.

Gerard John Sier (4 June 1928 – 13 April 2006) was a former Australian rules footballer who played with Fitzroy and Richmond in the Victorian Football League (VFL).

His brother Ken Sier also played for Fitzroy and Richmond.
