= Jim Burchill =

Australian rules footballer

Personal information
- Full name: James Freeman Burchill
- Born: 25 October 1897; Albert Park, Victoria
- Died: 18 December 1940 (aged 43); Canterbury, Victoria
- Original team: Camberwell District / Kooyong

Playing career^{1}
Years	Club	Games (Goals)
1918	Richmond	3 (5)
- ^{1} Playing statistics correct to the end of 1918.

James Freeman Burchill (25 October 1897 – 18 December 1940) was an Australian rules footballer who played with Richmond in the Victorian Football League (VFL). He was killed in a motor cycle accident in Canterbury, Melbourne in 1940.
