= Bruce Blainey =

Australian rules footballer

Personal information
- Full name: Bruce Blainey
- Born: 12 April 1939
- Original team: Hampton Rovers
- Height: 179 cm (5 ft 10 in)
- Weight: 79 kg (174 lb)

Playing career^{1}
Years	Club	Games (Goals)
1960	Richmond	1 (0)
- ^{1} Playing statistics correct to the end of 1960.

Bruce Blainey (born 12 April 1939) is a former Australian rules footballer who played with Richmond in the Victorian Football League (VFL).
