= George Driscoll =

Australian rules footballer

Personal information
- Full name: George Henry Driscoll
- Born: 19 December 1893; Sandringham, Victoria
- Died: 14 May 1964 (aged 70); Mordialloc, Victoria
- Original team: Black Rock

Playing career^{1}
Years	Club	Games (Goals)
1914	Richmond	2 (0)
- ^{1} Playing statistics correct to the end of 1914.

George Henry Driscoll (19 December 1893 – 14 May 1964) was an Australian rules footballer who played with Richmond in the Victorian Football League (VFL).
