= Bill Finlayson (Australian footballer) =

Australian rules footballer, born 1904

Personal information
- Full name: Bill Finlayson
- Born: 2 January 1904
- Died: 14 June 1976 (aged 72)
- Original team: Ballarat

Playing career^{1}
Years	Club	Games (Goals)
1926	Richmond	2 (0)
- ^{1} Playing statistics correct to the end of 1926.

Bill Finlayson (2 January 1904 – 14 June 1976) was a former Australian rules footballer who played with Richmond in the Victorian Football League (VFL).
