= Tom Garland (footballer, born 1943) =

Australian rules footballer

Personal information
- Full name: Tom Garland
- Born: 11 May 1943
- Original team: Yallourn
- Height: 183 cm (6 ft 0 in)
- Weight: 83 kg (183 lb)

Playing career^{1}
Years	Club	Games (Goals)
1963–64	Richmond	11 (1)
- ^{1} Playing statistics correct to the end of 1964.

Tom Garland (born 11 May 1943) is a former Australian rules footballer who played with Richmond in the Victorian Football League (VFL).
