= Wayne Shand =

Australian rules footballer

Personal information
- Born: 17 January 1961 (age 65)
- Original team: Essex Heights
- Height: 183 cm (6 ft 0 in)
- Weight: 83 kg (183 lb)

Playing career^{1}
Years	Club	Games (Goals)
1982–1984	Richmond	12 (1)
- ^{1} Playing statistics correct to the end of 1984.

Wayne Shand (born 17 January 1961) is a former Australian rules footballer who played with Richmond in the Victorian Football League (VFL).

Shand, a half-back from Essex Heights (Wodonga), played senior football for Richmond from 1982 to 1984. He played five games in 1982, six in 1983, then made a single appearance in 1984. After leaving Richmond he was briefly at Footscray, but didn't play a league game, then went to Old Haileyburians in the Victorian Amateur Football Association, as captain-coach.
