= Arthur Heath (footballer) =

Australian rules footballer (1890–1954)

Personal information
- Full name: Arthur Heath
- Born: 7 February 1890; South Yarra, Victoria
- Died: 19 February 1954 (aged 64); Mont Albert, Victoria
- Original team: Beverley
- Height: 180 cm (5 ft 11 in)
- Weight: 73 kg (161 lb)

Playing career^{1}
Years	Club	Games (Goals)
1913	Richmond	2 (1)
- ^{1} Playing statistics correct to the end of 1913.

Arthur Heath (7 February 1890 – 19 February 1954) was an Australian rules footballer who played for the Richmond Football Club in the Victorian Football League (VFL).
