= Bill S. McKenzie =

Australian rules footballer

Bill McKenzie

Personal information
- Full name: William Stanley McKenzie
- Born: 11 December 1934; Ballarat, Victoria
- Died: 13 May 1974 (aged 39); Hamilton, Victoria
- Height: 183 cm (6 ft 0 in)
- Weight: 83 kg (183 lb)

Playing career^{1}
Years	Club	Games (Goals)
1958	Richmond	4 (0)
- ^{1} Playing statistics correct to the end of 1958.

William Stanley McKenzie (11 December 1934 – 13 May 1974) was an Australian rules footballer who played with Richmond in the Victorian Football League (VFL).
