= Frank Kight =

Australian rules footballer, born 1905

Personal information
- Full name: Francis James Kight
- Born: 19 September 1905; Richmond, Victoria
- Died: 22 March 1983 (aged 77); Sorrento, Victoria
- Original team: Prahran Try Boys Society
- Height: 170 cm (5 ft 7 in)
- Weight: 68 kg (150 lb)

Playing career^{1}
Years	Club	Games (Goals)
1927–28	Richmond	3 (1)
- ^{1} Playing statistics correct to the end of 1928.

Francis James Kight (19 September 1905 – 22 March 1983) was an Australian rules footballer who played with Richmond in the Victorian Football League (VFL).
