= Stephen Parsons (Australian footballer) =

Australian rules footballer

Personal information
- Full name: Stephen Parsons
- Born: 19 October 1956 (age 70)
- Original team: Nunawading

Playing career^{1}
Years	Club	Games (Goals)
1974	Richmond	5 (1)
- ^{1} Playing statistics correct to the end of 1974.

Stephen Parsons (born 19 October 1956) is a former Australian rules footballer who played with Richmond in the Victorian Football League (VFL).
