= Tony Hunt (Australian footballer) =

Australian rules footballer

Personal information
- Full name: Tony Hunt
- Born: 10 May 1952 (age 74)
- Original team: De La Salle Old Collegians
- Height: 183 cm (6 ft 0 in)
- Weight: 81 kg (179 lb)
- Position: Bench

Playing career^{1}
Years	Club	Games (Goals)
1972	Richmond	1 (0)
- ^{1} Playing statistics correct to the end of 1972.

Career highlights
- Finding oppositions golf ball to lose board event at Huntingdale Lost Thailand teams amateur open by 3 putting the final hole.

Tony Hunt (born 10 May 1952) is a former Australian rules footballer who played with Richmond in the Victorian Football League (VFL).
