= Gus Petzke =

Australian rules footballer

Personal information
- Full name: August Mark Petzke
- Born: 23 August 1896; Kerang, Victoria
- Died: 26 May 1967 (aged 70); Melbourne, Victoria
- Height: 193 cm (6 ft 4 in)
- Weight: 96 kg (212 lb)

Playing career^{1}
Years	Club	Games (Goals)
1923	Richmond	2 (0)
1928	Yarraville (VFA)	6 (1)
- ^{1} Playing statistics correct to the end of 1928.

August Mark Petzke (23 August 1896 – 26 May 1967) was an Australian rules footballer who played with Richmond in the Victorian Football League (VFL).
