= Paul Morrison (footballer) =

Australian rules footballer

Personal information
- Full name: Paul Morrison
- Born: 22 July 1952
- Died: 30 June 2011 (aged 58)
- Height: 184 cm (6 ft 0 in)
- Weight: 80 kg (176 lb)

Playing career^{1}
Years	Club	Games (Goals)
1970	Richmond	5 (2)
- ^{1} Playing statistics correct to the end of 1970.

Paul Morrison (22 July 1952 – 30 June 2011) was a former Australian rules footballer who played with Richmond in the Victorian Football League (VFL).
