= 1923 VFL grand final =

Grand final of the 1923 Victorian Football League season

1923 VFL Grand Final

Essendon	Fitzroy
8.15 (63)	6.10 (46)
	1	2	3	4
ESS	3.2 (20)	4.10 (34)	6.13 (49)	8.15 (63)
FIT	3.3 (21)	5.5 (35)	5.9 (39)	6.10 (46)
- Date: 20 October 1923
- Stadium: Melbourne Cricket Ground
- Attendance: 46,566
- Umpires: Alec Mutch

The 1923 VFL Grand Final was an Australian rules football game contested between the Essendon Football Club and Fitzroy Football Club, held at the Melbourne Cricket Ground in Melbourne on 20 October 1923. It was the 26th annual Grand Final of the Victorian Football League, staged to determine the premiers for the 1923 VFL season. The match, attended by 46,566 spectators, was won by Essendon by a margin of 17 points, marking that club's fifth premiership victory.

The match was scheduled to take place a week earlier but was postponed because the ground had been flooded after heavy rain. As a result, this Grand Final coincided with the Caulfield Cup.

Fitzroy were the reigning premiers, while Essendon had not won a premiership since 1912. Essendon were known at this time as the "Mosquito Fleet" due to their large number of small and pacey players such as Charlie Hardy and George Shorten.

George Rawle made his VFL debut in the Grand Final.

== Score ==
Team	1	2	3	Final
Essendon	3.2	4.10	6.13	8.15 (63)
Fitzroy	3.3	5.5	5.9	6.10 (46)

== Teams ==
Essendon	Fitzroy

Essendon
B:	Vince Irwin	Fred Baring	Clyde Donaldson
HB:	Joe Harrison	Tom Fitzmaurice	Roy Laing
C:	Jack Garden	Charlie May	Rowley Watt
HF:	Tommy Jenkins	Justin McCarthy	George Shorten
F:	Syd Barker (c)	Greg Stockdale	Charlie Hardy
Foll:	Norm Beckton	George Rawle	Frank Maher
Coach:	Syd Barker		

Fitzroy
B:	Jim Atkinson	Horrie Jenkin	Len Wigraft
HB:	Jim Tarbotton	Stan Molan	Ern Elliot
C:	Arch Dickens	Tommy Corrigan	Clarrie Sherry
HF:	Percy Parratt	Norm Cockram	Gordon Rattray (c)
F:	Les Bryant	Jimmy Freake	Harold Carter
Foll:	Gordon McCracken	Goldie Collins	Clive Fergie
Coach:	Vic Belcher		

- Umpire – Alec Mutch

== Statistics ==
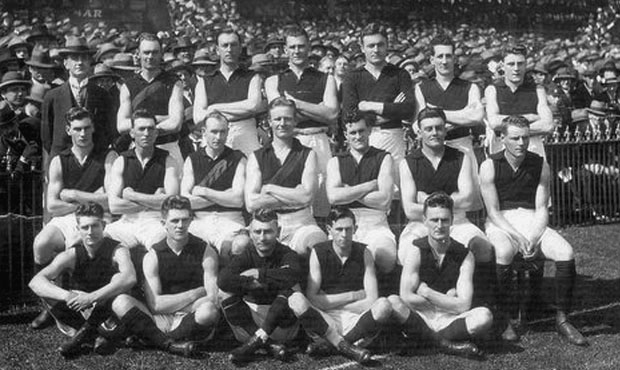
Essendon FC, Premier team

=== Goalkickers ===
Essendon:

- Maher 2
- McCarthy 2
- Stockdale 2
- Jenkins 1
- Shorten 1

Fitzroy:

- Freake 4
- Carter 1
- Rattray 1

=== Attendance ===
- MCG crowd – 46,566

== See also ==
- 1923 VFL season
