= 1923 VFL season =

27th season of the Victorian Football League (VFL)

1923 VFL premiership season
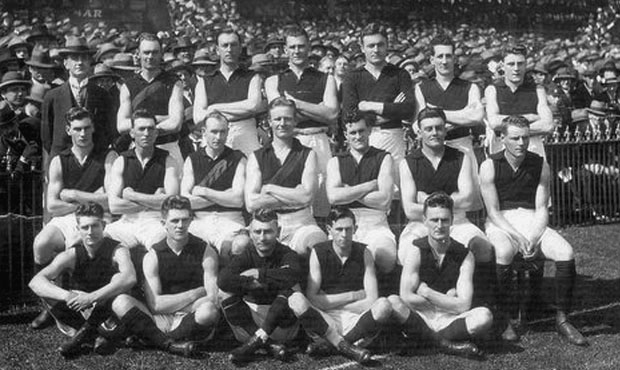
- Essendon 1923 VFL premiership team

Overview
- Date: 5 May – 20 October 1923
- Teams: 9
- Premiers: Essendon; 5th premiership
- Runners-up: Fitzroy; 5th runners-up result
- Minor premiers: Essendon; 3rd minor premiership
- Leading goalkicker medallist: Greg Stockdale (Essendon); 64 goals

Attendance
- Matches played: 76
- Total attendance: 1,544,888 (20,327 per match)
- Highest (H&A): 40,441 (round 18, South Melbourne v St Kilda)
- Highest (finals): 56,240 (semi-final, Fitzroy v Geelong)

The 1923 VFL season was the 27th season of the Victorian Football League (VFL), the highest-level senior Australian rules football competition in Victoria. The season featured nine clubs and ran from 5 May to 20 October, comprising a 16-match home-and-away season followed by a four-week finals series featuring the top four clubs.

Essendon won the premiership, defeating Fitzroy by 17 points in the 1923 VFL grand final; it was Essendon's fifth VFL premiership. Essendon also won the minor premiership by finishing atop the home-and-away ladder with a 13–3 win–loss record. Essendon's Greg Stockdale won the leading goalkicker medal as the league's leading goalkicker.

== Background ==
In 1923, the VFL competition had nine teams of 18 on-the-field players each, with no "reserves", although any of the 18 players who had left the playing field for any reason could later resume their place on the field at any time during the match.

Each team played each other twice in a home-and-away season of 18 rounds (i.e., 16 matches and 2 byes).

Once the 18 round home-and-away season had finished, the 1923 VFL Premiers were determined by the specific format and conventions of the amended "Argus system".

== Home-and-away season ==
=== Round 1 ===
| Home team | Home team score | Away team | Away team score | Venue | Crowd | Date |
|---|---|---|---|---|---|---|
| Melbourne | 7.8 (50) | Richmond | 7.13 (55) | MCG | 17,939 | 5 May 1923 |
| Essendon | 15.13 (103) | St Kilda | 8.12 (60) | Windy Hill | 20,000 | 5 May 1923 |
| South Melbourne | 12.7 (79) | Collingwood | 16.5 (101) | Lake Oval | 16,000 | 5 May 1923 |
| Fitzroy | 11.13 (79) | Carlton | 8.8 (56) | Brunswick Street Oval | 30,000 | 5 May 1923 |

=== Round 2 ===
| Home team | Home team score | Away team | Away team score | Venue | Crowd | Date |
|---|---|---|---|---|---|---|
| Geelong | 5.22 (52) | Melbourne | 11.14 (80) | Corio Oval | 10,000 | 12 May 1923 |
| Fitzroy | 9.11 (65) | South Melbourne | 9.9 (63) | Brunswick Street Oval | 12,000 | 12 May 1923 |
| Collingwood | 9.11 (65) | Essendon | 12.7 (79) | Victoria Park | 30,000 | 12 May 1923 |
| Carlton | 8.8 (56) | St Kilda | 14.16 (100) | Princes Park | 15,000 | 12 May 1923 |

=== Round 3 ===
| Home team | Home team score | Away team | Away team score | Venue | Crowd | Date |
|---|---|---|---|---|---|---|
| Geelong | 10.11 (71) | Fitzroy | 8.13 (61) | Corio Oval | 12,000 | 19 May 1923 |
| South Melbourne | 4.15 (39) | Essendon | 6.13 (49) | Lake Oval | 20,000 | 19 May 1923 |
| St Kilda | 10.9 (69) | Collingwood | 6.12 (48) | Junction Oval | 20,000 | 19 May 1923 |
| Richmond | 7.10 (52) | Carlton | 8.12 (60) | Punt Road Oval | 15,000 | 19 May 1923 |

=== Round 4 ===
| Home team | Home team score | Away team | Away team score | Venue | Crowd | Date |
|---|---|---|---|---|---|---|
| Richmond | 8.8 (56) | St Kilda | 8.13 (61) | Punt Road Oval | 20,000 | 26 May 1923 |
| Melbourne | 11.18 (84) | South Melbourne | 6.13 (49) | MCG | 15,232 | 26 May 1923 |
| Collingwood | 16.23 (119) | Geelong | 10.12 (72) | Victoria Park | 12,000 | 26 May 1923 |
| Carlton | 9.11 (65) | Essendon | 14.19 (103) | Princes Park | 33,000 | 26 May 1923 |

=== Round 5 ===
| Home team | Home team score | Away team | Away team score | Venue | Crowd | Date |
|---|---|---|---|---|---|---|
| Essendon | 4.13 (37) | Fitzroy | 8.12 (60) | Windy Hill | 35,000 | 2 June 1923 |
| St Kilda | 8.15 (63) | Melbourne | 12.13 (85) | Junction Oval | 26,000 | 2 June 1923 |
| Collingwood | 11.16 (82) | Richmond | 5.14 (44) | Victoria Park | 22,000 | 4 June 1923 |
| South Melbourne | 13.11 (89) | Geelong | 10.15 (75) | Lake Oval | 12,000 | 4 June 1923 |

=== Round 6 ===
| Home team | Home team score | Away team | Away team score | Venue | Crowd | Date |
|---|---|---|---|---|---|---|
| Geelong | 7.16 (58) | St Kilda | 6.10 (46) | Corio Oval | 9,500 | 9 June 1923 |
| Fitzroy | 11.11 (77) | Melbourne | 9.16 (70) | Brunswick Street Oval | 18,000 | 9 June 1923 |
| Carlton | 5.19 (49) | South Melbourne | 7.9 (51) | Princes Park | 20,000 | 9 June 1923 |
| Richmond | 9.11 (65) | Essendon | 12.15 (87) | Punt Road Oval | 16,000 | 9 June 1923 |

=== Round 7 ===
| Home team | Home team score | Away team | Away team score | Venue | Crowd | Date |
|---|---|---|---|---|---|---|
| Geelong | 6.14 (50) | Richmond | 8.8 (56) | Corio Oval | 11,500 | 16 June 1923 |
| St Kilda | 4.14 (38) | Fitzroy | 9.20 (74) | Junction Oval | 17,000 | 16 June 1923 |
| Melbourne | 8.12 (60) | Essendon | 11.8 (74) | MCG | 29,979 | 16 June 1923 |
| Collingwood | 10.15 (75) | Carlton | 6.14 (50) | Victoria Park | 18,000 | 16 June 1923 |

=== Round 8 ===
| Home team | Home team score | Away team | Away team score | Venue | Crowd | Date |
|---|---|---|---|---|---|---|
| Essendon | 14.13 (97) | Geelong | 8.6 (54) | Windy Hill | 13,000 | 23 June 1923 |
| South Melbourne | 12.13 (85) | Richmond | 4.10 (34) | Lake Oval | 20,000 | 23 June 1923 |
| Fitzroy | 7.11 (53) | Collingwood | 7.5 (47) | Brunswick Street Oval | 20,000 | 23 June 1923 |
| Melbourne | 9.11 (65) | Carlton | 11.8 (74) | MCG | 17,558 | 23 June 1923 |

=== Round 9 ===
| Home team | Home team score | Away team | Away team score | Venue | Crowd | Date |
|---|---|---|---|---|---|---|
| St Kilda | 7.14 (56) | South Melbourne | 6.9 (45) | Junction Oval | 20,000 | 7 July 1923 |
| Collingwood | 11.10 (76) | Melbourne | 6.6 (42) | Victoria Park | 8,000 | 7 July 1923 |
| Carlton | 13.10 (88) | Geelong | 13.15 (93) | Princes Park | 12,000 | 7 July 1923 |
| Richmond | 6.15 (51) | Fitzroy | 10.10 (70) | Punt Road Oval | 15,000 | 7 July 1923 |

=== Round 10 ===
| Home team | Home team score | Away team | Away team score | Venue | Crowd | Date |
|---|---|---|---|---|---|---|
| Collingwood | 8.8 (56) | South Melbourne | 11.11 (77) | Victoria Park | 15,000 | 14 July 1923 |
| Carlton | 13.8 (86) | Fitzroy | 12.13 (85) | Princes Park | 26,000 | 14 July 1923 |
| Richmond | 11.17 (83) | Melbourne | 11.12 (78) | Punt Road Oval | 11,000 | 14 July 1923 |
| St Kilda | 5.5 (35) | Essendon | 1.12 (18) | Junction Oval | 24,000 | 14 July 1923 |

=== Round 11 ===
| Home team | Home team score | Away team | Away team score | Venue | Crowd | Date |
|---|---|---|---|---|---|---|
| Melbourne | 8.8 (56) | Geelong | 10.15 (75) | MCG | 9,353 | 21 July 1923 |
| South Melbourne | 8.12 (60) | Fitzroy | 8.8 (56) | Lake Oval | 23,000 | 21 July 1923 |
| Essendon | 13.13 (91) | Collingwood | 7.9 (51) | Windy Hill | 15,000 | 21 July 1923 |
| St Kilda | 7.14 (56) | Carlton | 6.11 (47) | Junction Oval | 28,000 | 21 July 1923 |

=== Round 12 ===
| Home team | Home team score | Away team | Away team score | Venue | Crowd | Date |
|---|---|---|---|---|---|---|
| Fitzroy | 6.11 (47) | Geelong | 7.10 (52) | Brunswick Street Oval | 12,000 | 28 July 1923 |
| Essendon | 10.8 (68) | South Melbourne | 7.9 (51) | Windy Hill | 25,000 | 28 July 1923 |
| Collingwood | 6.7 (43) | St Kilda | 4.7 (31) | Victoria Park | 20,000 | 28 July 1923 |
| Carlton | 8.11 (59) | Richmond | 5.10 (40) | Princes Park | 14,000 | 28 July 1923 |

=== Round 13 ===
| Home team | Home team score | Away team | Away team score | Venue | Crowd | Date |
|---|---|---|---|---|---|---|
| St Kilda | 8.12 (60) | Richmond | 3.7 (25) | Junction Oval | 18,000 | 4 August 1923 |
| South Melbourne | 9.13 (67) | Melbourne | 5.11 (41) | Lake Oval | 12,000 | 4 August 1923 |
| Geelong | 9.18 (72) | Collingwood | 3.8 (26) | Corio Oval | 15,000 | 4 August 1923 |
| Essendon | 15.13 (103) | Carlton | 5.7 (37) | Windy Hill | 25,000 | 4 August 1923 |

=== Round 14 ===
| Home team | Home team score | Away team | Away team score | Venue | Crowd | Date |
|---|---|---|---|---|---|---|
| Melbourne | 6.13 (49) | St Kilda | 11.18 (84) | MCG | 15,599 | 11 August 1923 |
| Geelong | 8.15 (63) | South Melbourne | 10.10 (70) | Corio Oval | 17,000 | 11 August 1923 |
| Fitzroy | 10.18 (78) | Essendon | 8.9 (57) | Brunswick Street Oval | 34,000 | 11 August 1923 |
| Richmond | 11.10 (76) | Collingwood | 6.19 (55) | Punt Road Oval | 12,000 | 11 August 1923 |

=== Round 15 ===
| Home team | Home team score | Away team | Away team score | Venue | Crowd | Date |
|---|---|---|---|---|---|---|
| Essendon | 9.8 (62) | Richmond | 8.6 (54) | Windy Hill | 18,000 | 25 August 1923 |
| St Kilda | 9.17 (71) | Geelong | 13.9 (87) | Junction Oval | 30,000 | 25 August 1923 |
| Melbourne | 7.4 (46) | Fitzroy | 11.14 (80) | MCG | 12,146 | 25 August 1923 |
| South Melbourne | 10.8 (68) | Carlton | 13.11 (89) | Lake Oval | 20,000 | 25 August 1923 |

=== Round 16 ===
| Home team | Home team score | Away team | Away team score | Venue | Crowd | Date |
|---|---|---|---|---|---|---|
| Fitzroy | 13.19 (97) | St Kilda | 9.15 (69) | Brunswick Street Oval | 23,000 | 1 September 1923 |
| Essendon | 13.20 (98) | Melbourne | 6.5 (41) | Windy Hill | 10,000 | 1 September 1923 |
| Carlton | 10.12 (72) | Collingwood | 10.12 (72) | Princes Park | 18,000 | 1 September 1923 |
| Richmond | 10.19 (79) | Geelong | 13.13 (91) | Punt Road Oval | 18,000 | 1 September 1923 |

=== Round 17 ===
| Home team | Home team score | Away team | Away team score | Venue | Crowd | Date |
|---|---|---|---|---|---|---|
| Richmond | 8.7 (55) | South Melbourne | 14.16 (100) | Punt Road Oval | 25,000 | 8 September 1923 |
| Collingwood | 12.12 (84) | Fitzroy | 6.13 (49) | Victoria Park | 20,000 | 8 September 1923 |
| Carlton | 9.20 (74) | Melbourne | 7.4 (46) | Princes Park | 12,000 | 8 September 1923 |
| Geelong | 9.6 (60) | Essendon | 8.14 (62) | Corio Oval | 20,000 | 8 September 1923 |

=== Round 18 ===
| Home team | Home team score | Away team | Away team score | Venue | Crowd | Date |
|---|---|---|---|---|---|---|
| Fitzroy | 13.11 (89) | Richmond | 11.15 (81) | Brunswick Street Oval | 9,000 | 15 September 1923 |
| South Melbourne | 8.20 (68) | St Kilda | 7.6 (48) | Lake Oval | 40,441 | 15 September 1923 |
| Melbourne | 11.21 (87) | Collingwood | 21.12 (138) | MCG | 9,414 | 15 September 1923 |
| Geelong | 15.13 (103) | Carlton | 4.14 (38) | Corio Oval | 16,000 | 15 September 1923 |

== Ladder ==
| (P) | Premiers |
| | Qualified for finals |

| # | Team | P | W | L | D | PF | PA | % | Pts |
|---|---|---|---|---|---|---|---|---|---|
| 1 | Essendon (P) | 16 | 13 | 3 | 0 | 1188 | 875 | 135.8 | 52 |
| 2 | Fitzroy | 16 | 11 | 5 | 0 | 1120 | 968 | 115.7 | 44 |
| 3 | South Melbourne | 16 | 9 | 7 | 0 | 1061 | 989 | 107.3 | 36 |
| 4 | Geelong | 16 | 9 | 7 | 0 | 1128 | 1085 | 104.0 | 36 |
| 5 | Collingwood | 16 | 8 | 7 | 1 | 1138 | 1043 | 109.1 | 34 |
| 6 | St Kilda | 16 | 8 | 8 | 0 | 947 | 959 | 98.7 | 32 |
| 7 | Carlton | 16 | 6 | 9 | 1 | 1000 | 1191 | 84.0 | 26 |
| 8 | Richmond | 16 | 4 | 12 | 0 | 906 | 1139 | 79.5 | 16 |
| 9 | Melbourne | 16 | 3 | 13 | 0 | 980 | 1219 | 80.4 | 12 |

Rules for classification: 1. premiership points; 2. percentage; 3. points for
Average score: 65.8
Source: AFL Tables

== Finals series ==
=== Semi-finals ===
| Home team | Home team score | Away team | Away team score | Venue | Crowd | Date |
|---|---|---|---|---|---|---|
| Fitzroy | 14.13 (97) | Geelong | 8.14 (62) | MCG | 56,240 | 22 September 1923 |
| Essendon | 8.9 (57) | South Melbourne | 10.14 (74) | MCG | 55,614 | 29 September 1923 |

=== Preliminary final ===
| Home team | Home team score | Away team | Away team score | Venue | Crowd | Date |
|---|---|---|---|---|---|---|
| South Melbourne | 6.7 (43) | Fitzroy | 7.13 (55) | MCG | 55,039 | 6 October 1923 |

=== Grand final ===
| Home team | Home team score | Away team | Away team score | Venue | Crowd | Date |
|---|---|---|---|---|---|---|
| Essendon | 8.15 (63) | Fitzroy | 6.10 (46) | MCG | 46,566 | 20 October 1923 |

== Season notes ==
- New scoreboards are erected at each home ground by the VFL's publication, The Football Record. With the help of a key published in that Saturday afternoon's Record, spectators can decipher the coded quarter-by-quarter scores of the other three matches as they appear on these scoreboards throughout the afternoon.
- After the round 13 match against Essendon at Windy Hill, at an after-match function in the Essendon rooms, Carlton rover George Bolt and backman Jack Morrissey (who had not played in that game) came to blows. The Carlton Committee met the next day and suspended both players indefinitely. Bolt never played for Carlton again (he reappeared with Hawthorn in 1925, then he played for North Melbourne in 1926 and 1927); Jack Morrissey played his next game for Carlton on 27 June 1925 (round 9).
- The 1922 Victorian Interstate team captain, and Carlton star ruckman, Bert Boromeo was overheard being intensely critical of the Carlton captain-coach Horrie Clover at the same function. The Carlton Committee was upset at such behaviour occurring on the premises of another club, and suspended Boromeo immediately; eventually, in 1926, Carlton cleared Boromeo to Richmond for whom he played 14 games.
- Following Geelong's two-point loss against Essendon in Round 17, Geelong protested the result and sought that the game be replayed, arguing that the game had been played short of its full duration because the umpire had failed to blow time on on several occasions. Although the timekeepers agreed that the final quarter had been played at least 90 seconds short of full time, the protest was dismissed.
- The Essendon Premiership team was known as the "Mosquito Fleet", due to the number of small, very fast players in the side. Six were 5'6" (167 cm) or less: Charlie Hardy 5'1" (155 cm), who played his first VFL game at the age of 34, George Shorten 5'5" (165 cm), Jack Garden 5'5" (165 cm), Frank Maher 5'6" (167.5 cm), Vince Irwin 5'6" (167.5 cm), and Jimmy Sullivan 5'6" (167.5 cm).
- In Round 10 against St. Kilda, Essendon kicked the season's lowest score, but they still won the premiership. They became the first premier team to have also kicked the season's lowest score, an occurrence replicated in 1968, 1970, 1992 and 1995.
- The Challenge Final match had to be postponed for a week as the Melbourne Cricket Ground was under water due to intense rain. This meant that the Challenge Final was played on Saturday 20 October 1923, Caulfield Cup Day.
- The semi-final between Essendon and South Melbourne was held after a curtain-raiser between Camberwell and Fairfield in the Melbourne District Football Association grand final.

== Awards ==
- The 1923 VFL Premiership team was Essendon.
- The VFL's leading goalkicker was Greg Stockdale of Essendon with 68 goals.
- Melbourne took the "wooden spoon" in 1923.
- The Victorian Junior League premiership, which is today recognised as the VFL reserves, was won by Geelong (main: 1923 VJFL season).

== Sources ==
- 1923 VFL season at AFL Tables
- 1923 VFL season at Australian Football
