= 1922 VFL grand final =

Grand final of the 1922 Victorian Football League season

1922 VFL Grand Final
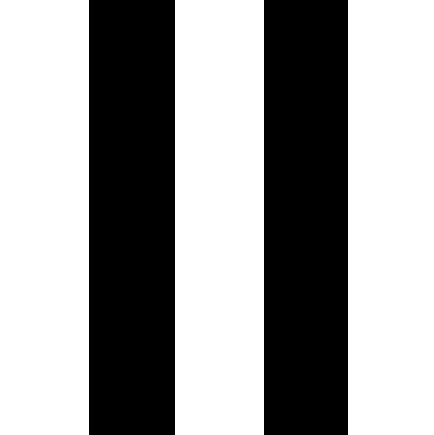

Collingwood	Fitzroy
9.14 (68)	11.13 (79)
	1	2	3	4
COLL	2.3 (15)	4.5 (29)	7.7 (49)	9.14 (68)
FIT	2.5 (17)	3.6 (24)	9.10 (64)	11.13 (79)
- Date: 21 October 1922
- Stadium: Melbourne Cricket Ground
- Attendance: 50,064

The 1922 VFL Grand Final was an Australian rules football game contested between the Fitzroy Football Club and Collingwood Football Club, held at the Melbourne Cricket Ground in Melbourne on 14 October 1922. It was the 25th annual Grand Final of the Victorian Football League, staged to determine the premiers for the 1922 VFL season.

The half-time break was more than thirty minutes.

The match, attended by 50,064 spectators, was won by Fitzroy by a margin of 11 points, marking that club's seventh premiership victory.

== Score ==
Team	1	2	3	Final
Fitzroy	2.5	3.6	9.10	11.13 (79)
Collingwood	2.3	4.5	7.7	9.14 (68)

== Teams ==
Fitzroy	Collingwood

Fitzroy
B:	Jim Atkinson	Horrie Jenkin	Bert Taylor
HB:	Chris Lethbridge (c)	Stan Molan	Ern Elliot
C:	Clarrie Sherry	Tommy Corrigan	Fred Williams
HF:	Percy Parratt	Steve Donnellan	Gordon Rattray
F:	Len Wigraft	Jimmy Freake	Len Gale
Foll:	Gordon McCracken	Goldie Collins	Clive Fergie
Coach:	Vic Belcher		

Collingwood
B:	Ernie Wilson	Harry Saunders	Laurie Murphy
HB:	Charlie Tyson	Charlie Brown	Bill Twomey
C:	Tom Drummond (c)	Charlie Pannam	Leo Wescott
HF:	Harry Chesswas	Syd Coventry	Gordon Coventry
F:	Eric Cock	Dick Lee	Ted Baker
Foll:	Percy Rowe	Maurie Sheehy	Reynolds Webb
Coach:	Jock McHale		

- Umpire – Jack Elder

== Statistics ==
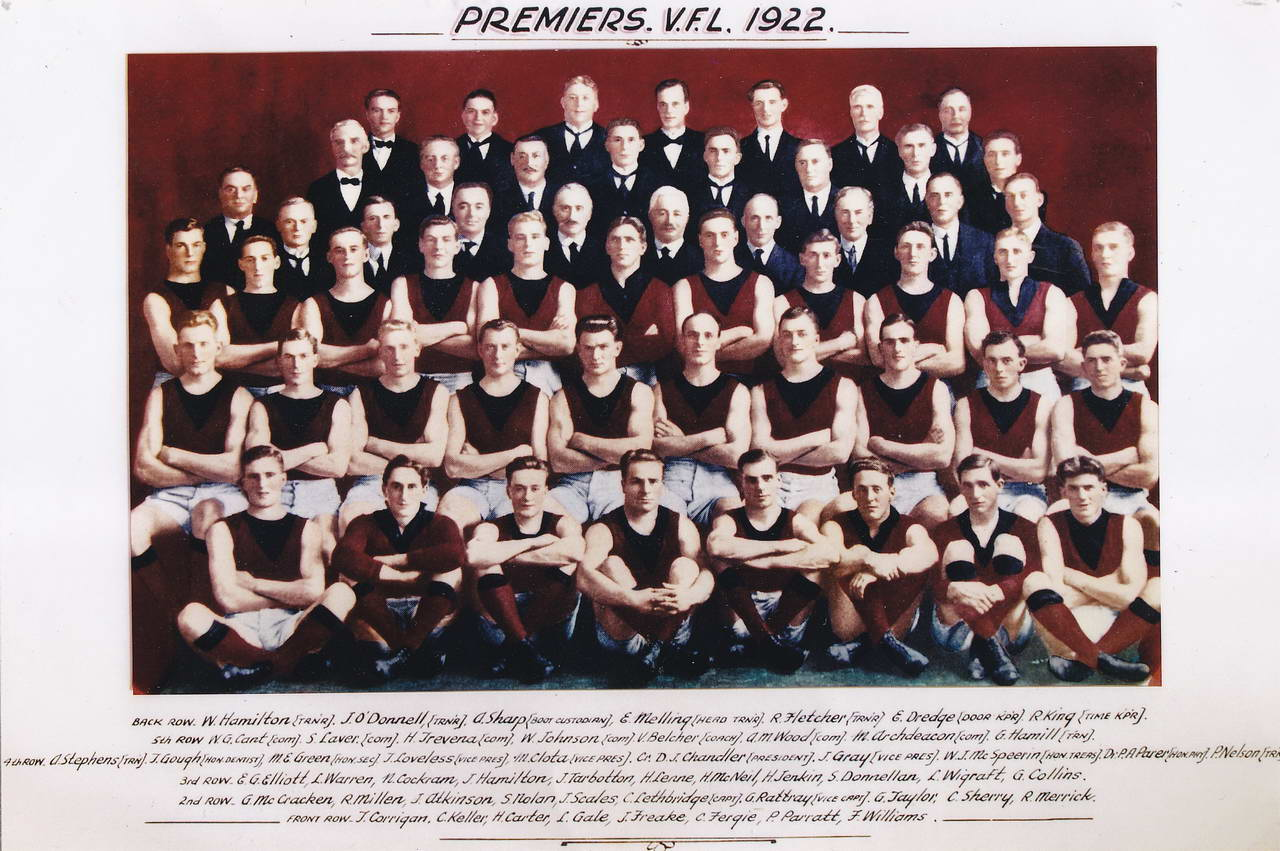
Fitzroy FC, Premiers

=== Goalkickers ===
Fitzroy:

- J Freake 4
- P Parratt 3
- C Fergie 1
- G McCracken 1
- L Wigraft 1
- F Williams 1

Collingwood:

- G Coventry 3
- S Coventry 2
- D Lee 2
- T Baker 1
- T Drummond 1

== See also ==
- 1922 VFL season
