= Vince Irwin =

Australian rules footballer (1899–1959)

Vincent Irwin

Personal information
- Full name: Vincent Michael Irwin
- Nickname: Vin
- Born: 4 February 1899; West Melbourne, Victoria
- Died: 29 May 1959 (aged 60)
- Original team: North Melbourne (VFA)
- Debut: Round 11, 1921, Essendon vs. Geelong, at East Melbourne
- Height: 169 cm (5 ft 7 in)
- Weight: 70 kg (154 lb)

Playing career^{1}
Years	Club	Games (Goals)
1921–1926	Essendon	78 (102)
- ^{1} Playing statistics correct to the end of 1926.

Vincent Michael Irwin (4 February 1899 – 29 May 1959) was an Australian rules footballer who played with Essendon in the Victorian Football League (VFL) during the 1920s.

== Family ==
The youngest of 11 children of John Irwin and Mary Irwin, née Humphries, Vincent Michael Irwin was born in West Melbourne, Victoria on 4 February 1899.

He married Dora Peters in 1921.

== Football ==
=== North Melbourne (VFA) ===
Irwin played a total of 43 games with North Melbourne in the Victorian Football Association (VFA) over three seasons (1919–1921), and scored 34 goals.

=== Essendon (VFL) ===
Along with a number of other North Melbourne footballers, including Syd Barker, Charlie Hardy, Ralph Gardiner, and Tommy Jenkins—who, upon the (1921) disbandment of North Melbourne, in anticipation of the (eventually unsuccessful) proposed merge of the North Melbourne VFA club into the VFL club Essendon—Irwin moved to Essendon.

Irwin started his career as a defender, and played in the back pocket when Essendon won the 1923 premiership.

In 1924, he moved from the backline to the forward pocket, kicking 10 goals against St Kilda, at Windy Hill, on 14 June 1924. He finished 1924 with 28 goals and in 1925 and 1926 kicked 27 and 30 goals, respectively. In total, Irwin played 78 games for Essendon, kicking 102 goals, and was a four-time Victorian interstate representative.

==== "Mosquito Fleet" ====
Irwin was only 5'6" tall; and, along with six others — Jack Garden (5'5"), Charlie Hardy (5'3"), Frank Maher (5'6"), George "Tich" Shorten (5'5"), Jimmy Sullivan (5'6"), and Rowley Watt (5'4") — Maher was one of Essendon's legendary "mosquito fleet". According to some, (for example, Essendon's Famous "Mosquito Fleet" is a Worry to Opposing Sides, The Sporting Globe, (Saturday, 22 May 1926), p.6) there were another two Essendon players that were diminutive enough to be considered to be "mosquitoes": Garnet Campbell (5'7½"), and Greg Stockdale (5'8").

The term "mosquito fleet" was drawn by analogy from a maritime expression relating to particular assemblies of small vessels (e.g., the South Australian "mosquito fleet", the Queensland "mosquito fleet", a number of different U.S. "mosquito fleets", etc.).

=== South Bendigo (BFL) ===
In 1927, Irwin was appointed captain-coach of the South Bendigo Football Club in the Bendigo Football League (BFL), replacing the former South Melbourne footballer Arthur Hando.

=== Oakleigh (VFA) ===
In 1929, two new teams, Oakleigh and Sandringham, were admitted to the Victorian Football Association (VFA) competition.

In 1929, along with Geelong's Eric Fleming, St Kilda's Wal Gunnyon, Essendon's Frank Maher, and Chris Gomez, and Richmond's Fred Goding, and George Rudolph, all of whom went to Oakleigh without a clearance from the VFL (in doing so all were automatically disqualified from the VFL for three years). Irwin also went to Oakleigh — albeit with a clearance from South Bendigo.

He played a single season of 22 games with Oakleigh, and scored 39 goals.

=== Yallourn (CGFL) ===
In 1930, Irwin was appointed captain-coach of the Yallourn Football Club in the Central Gippsland Football League (CGFL), and coached them for six seasons (1930–1935). during which time the team won three premierships (1931, 1932, and 1933) and was runner-up twice (1934, and 1935).

== Death ==
He died at Yallourn, Victoria on 29 May 1959.
