= 1924 Championship of Victoria =

Dame Nellie Melba's Appeal for Limbless Soldiers match
- Result: Footscray (VFA) 9.10 (64) def. Essendon (VFL) 4.12 (36)
- Date: 4 October 1924
- Crowd: 46,100
- Stadium: Melbourne Cricket Ground
- City: Melbourne

The 1924 match for Dame Nellie Melba's Appeal for Limbless Soldiers, informally known as the 1924 Championship of Victoria, was an Australian rules football exhibition match played on 4 October 1924 between the Essendon Football Club and the Footscray Football Club – who were that season's premiers of the Victorian Football League (VFL) and Victorian Football Association (VFA), respectively. Footscray recorded an upset victory against Essendon by 28 points, giving the VFA one of its most significant victories, on-field or off-field, against its stronger-rival competition. The match raised £2,800 (≈A$249,500 in 2022) for the fund.

== Background ==
Dame Nellie Melba

In 1897, eight of the strongest clubs in Victoria broke away from the Victorian Football Association to form the Victorian Football League. Since that time, the two competitions had been strong off-field rivals, with the VFL assuming the position as the strongest competition in the state, and generally doing little to assist the VFA. The VFA had often tried to arrange matches against the VFL, particularly a championship playoff match between the two premiers, in an attempt to lift its own prestige and gate takings, but such offers were almost always rejected by the league. By 1924, a total of only two matches between the VFL and VFA had taken place, excluding pre-season practice matches. These were:

- In 1902, the VFL 9.17 (71) defeated the VFA 4.3 (27), in a representative match to raise money for the benefit of former player Fred McGinis.
- In 1915, North Melbourne (VFA) 8.9 (57) defeated St Kilda (VFL) 4.7 (31), for the benefit of Lady Stanley's Fund for Australian Wounded Soldiers.

In 1924, it was proposed to stage a match between the VFL and VFA for the benefit of the Limbless Soldiers' Appeal, organised by Dame Nellie Melba. It was decided that the match should be a playoff between the premiers of each competition, the first time such a match had ever been staged; on the historical significance of the match, future Hall of Fame sportswriter Reginald Wilmot commented "Nothing but the appeal of Dame Nellie Melba, on behalf of the limbless soldiers, could have induced the League to agree to a game which they have strenuously opposed for nearly 30 years."

== Arrangements ==
Arrangements for the match began to be drawn up in late September. Essendon was in a position to claim the VFL premiership with a win or narrow loss on 27 September, but a heavy loss would require a grand final to have been played on 4 October. Footscray had claimed the VFA premiership on 20 September, and was available to play on either 27 September or 4 October, but had already scheduled a tour of Gippsland which precluded playing the match on 11 October. As such, for the game to be played at all, Essendon would need to win the premiership without a grand final – which it did with a 20-point loss to Richmond on 27 September. The benefit match was then scheduled for 4 October. Richmond made itself available to replace Footscray, should the VFL and VFA have been unable to reach mutually satisfactory arrangements for the game.

The Australian Football Council, of which the VFL was a member and the VFA was not, gave its consent for the match to be played, but stipulated that the game must be played on a VFL ground, and under VFL rules. At the time, the VFA and VFL played under mostly the same rules, including each fielding eighteen players per side, with only a few technical differences, so Footscray was not put at any significant disadvantage as a result of this. The two competitions were permitted by the AFC to compromise on the appointment of umpires, so VFA umpire Leheny officiated in the first and third quarters, and VFL umpire McMurray officiated in the second and final quarters. The supplier of football also alternated through the match between Sherrin (VFL) and Don (VFA).

The Melbourne Cricket Club made the Melbourne Cricket Ground available free of charge for the match, and the umpires also donated their time to the cause. Admission cost 1/- to the outer, and 2/6 to the grandstand. Playing in a VFL venue, Essendon was the home team, and wore black knicks.

The League was considered the top level of football in the state, and was considered to be a class above the Association in quality; as such, it was generally thought that Essendon would easily defeat Footscray. Footscray, which had dominated the VFA by winning the previous five minor premierships, had recruited heavily from the League over the previous few years, and fielded a total of nine former senior VFL players for the game – including five who had played with Essendon – and considered itself a strong chance to cause an upset. Both teams were at near full strength for the match; Footscray's eighteen was unchanged from its premiership winning team, and Essendon was permitted to field its captain-coach Syd Barker, Sr., because a suspension he was still serving was valid only in premiership matches, which this game was not.

The match was promoted as the 'Championship of Victoria', although it had no official status as such.

== Match ==
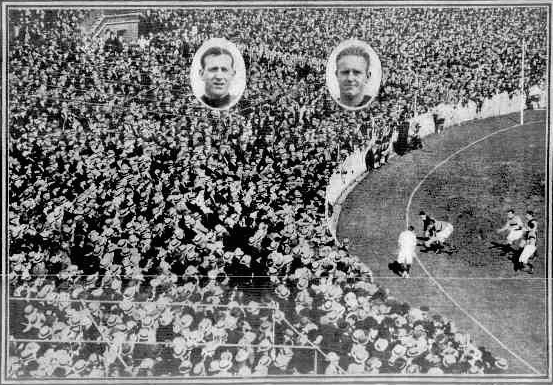
Crowd at the Championship of Victoria, with inserted images of club captains Con McCarthy (Footscray) and Syd Barker (Essendon)

The match was played in front of a crowd of 46,100, on par with a typical VFL finals or grand final crowd in the early 1920s. The majority were supporting Footscray, with many fans of many other VFA clubs supporting Footscray as a means of supporting the VFA against the VFL. At the time, it was the highest crowd an Association club had ever played to, exceeding the then-record Association crowd of 41,000 which saw the 1908 grand final. The match raised more than £2,800 for the appeal. In the curtain raiser, VFL wooden spooners St Kilda 19.16 (130) defeated NSWAFA runners-up Newtown 8.11 (59) by 71 points.

Essendon won the toss and kicked to the Punt Road end of the ground in the first quarter. Essendon started well, with Tommy Jenkins kicking the first goal inside the first minute of play, and kicking another shortly afterwards. Thereafter, Footscray did most of the attacking for the quarter, but finished with only two goals, and were repeatedly repelled by the Essendon defenders, particularly Watt, Fitzmaurice, Donaldson and Maher. Essendon kicked a late goal to lead by four points at quarter time. Play in the second quarter was similar, with Footscray doing most of the attacking and Essendon mostly keeping them out; Mullens (Footscray) kicked the only goal of the quarter, but two late behinds allowed Essendon to take a one-point lead into half time. Roy Laing (Essendon) was off the ground with a leg injury for much of the second quarter, eventually finishing the game in the forward line, but was too injured to have any impact.

After half time, Footscray began to assert its dominance, particularly by handball. Footscray scored two goals in the third quarter – Punch early in the quarter and O'Brien near the end – to take a two-goal lead into three-quarter time. Both teams attacked early in the final quarter, Footscray managing three goals, but Essendon managing only four behinds, to put the result beyond doubt. At this stage, Footscray had kicked eight of the last nine goals in the game, and Essendon had kicked 0.11 (11) since quarter time. Both teams managed a late goal, and Footscray won the game by 28 points.

Overall, despite the match being close for three quarters, Footscray was the better team in all aspects of the game throughout the match – to an extent which surprised many onlookers who expected Essendon to win comfortably. In particular, Footscray was able to move the ball with the extensive use of handpassing – their technique was close to a throw, and was considered borderline illegal by reporters at the time, but was allowed by both umpires. Essendon's defence played admirably, but many of its midfielders and forwards were ineffective on the day.

Dame Nellie Melba's match for the Limbless Soldiers' Appeal
Saturday, 4 October	Essendon	def. by	Footscray	Melbourne Cricket Ground (crowd: 46,100)
3.1 (19); 3.5 (23); 3.8 (26); 4.12 (36)	Q1; Q2; Q3; Final	2.3 (15); 3.4 (21); 5.8 (38); 9.10 (64)	Umpires: Leheny, McMurray
Jenkins 2, May, Shorten	Goals	Punch 3, McHenry 2, Mullins 2, O'Brien, Samson
Watt, Fitzmaurice, Donaldson, Maher, Stockdale	Best	Samson, Laidlaw, Eason, Punch, McCarthy, Ford
Laing (leg)	Injuries

== Aftermath ==
The victorious Footscray Football Club was admitted to the VFL, along with VFA clubs North Melbourne and Hawthorn, prior to the following season. The VFL's decision was not based entirely on on-field merit, with strategic drivers and off-field strength also taken into consideration, so whether or not Footscray's win in this match had any direct bearing on its admission is a matter which divides football historians. Nevertheless, Footscray had been unsuccessfully applying to join the VFL since at least as early as 1919, and believed the exposure which came with playing this game, even without the prestige which ultimately came with winning the game, would be helpful to its ultimate goal of gaining admission. Some VFA delegates believed that Footscray's win, by affirming the VFA's strength, was the prime motivation for the VFL to admit three clubs in 1925 rather than one – to maximise the damage to the VFA and to assert its own superiority.

In an interview with the Sporting Globe newspaper in 1935, Essendon defender Tom Fitzmaurice made allegations that some of his teammates had taken bribes to play stiff during the game, fixing the result in Footscray's favour, and told the newspaper that his disgust at this conduct had prompted him to leave the Essendon Football Club after the season; rover Charlie Hardy made the same allegations of match-fixing to the newspaper the following week, alleging that he believed Essendon's last finals match against Richmond the previous week had also been fixed. Their allegations were vague, as neither man was himself offered any bribe, nor gave the names of any players they believed to have been bribed — although some of Hardy's allegations were understood to have referred to captain-coach Syd Barker, Sr., who had died in 1930, precluding any response to the claims. Neither the League nor the Association ever investigated or proved Fitzmaurice's and Hardy's allegations, so the veracity of their claims is unknown.

== See also ==
- 1924 VFL season
- 1924 VFA season
