= Frank Maher (footballer) =

Australian rules footballer (1895–1976)

Personal information
- Full name: Francis William Maher
- Born: 22 September 1895; Camberwell, Victoria, Australia
- Died: 7 November 1976 (aged 81); Echuca, Victoria, Australia
- Original teams: Shepparton, Lilydale
- Debut: 11 June 1921, Essendon vs. Carlton, at East Melbourne Cricket Ground
- Height: 167.5 cm (5 ft 6 in)
- Weight: 70 kg (154 lb)

Playing career^{1}
Years	Club	Games (Goals)
1921–1928	Essendon (VFL)	137 (124)
1929–1931	Oakleigh VFA)	48 (69)
Total		185 (193)

Representative team honours
Years	Team	Games (Goals)
1921–1928	Victoria	9

Coaching career
Years	Club	Games (W–L–D)
1927	Essendon	18 (6–11–1)
1932–1933	Fitzroy	36 (14–21–1)
1935–1936	Carlton	38 (26–11–1)
Total		92 (46–43–3)
- ^{1} Playing statistics correct to the end of 1931.

Career highlights
- Essendon Premiership: 1923, 1924; Essendon Captain: 1925-1928 (77 games); Essendon Vice-Captain: 1924; Essendon Best and Fairest: 1927; Victoria captain: 1927, 1928.

Francis William Maher MM (22 September 1895 – 7 November 1976) was a decorated Australian soldier who served in the First AIF, and was an Australian footballer and coach in the Victorian Football League (VFL) and the Victorian Football Association (VFA).

== Family ==
The son of Cornelius Maher (1865–1934), and Mary Jane Maher (1869–1943), née Walmsley, Francis William Maher was born in Camberwell, Victoria, on 22 September 1895.

He married Harriet Louise "Ettie" Benyan (1899–1979) in 1920.

== Military service ==
Maher served in the First AIF as a machine gunner from 1916 to 1919. Enlisted as a private, and holding the rank of Lieutenant at his discharge from service, he was awarded the Military Medal for gallantry in May 1918 for his actions in France during the Battle of Broodseinde in October 1917.

Corporal Francis William Maher (3845)
2nd Aust. Machine Gun Company.

[Recommendation for the Award of Military Medal]
During the operation at Broodseinde Ridge east of Ypres on 4th to
11th October 1917, this N.C.O. was in charge of a machine gun.
He was wounded but refused to leave his post.
His gun position was blown in by shell fire and he showed great
coolness and ability in constructing a new position under very
heavy shell fire and in getting his gun and men forward into it.
His conduct throughout was splendid and his cheerful behaviour
and fine exhibition of courage and endurance were a great example
to his men and no doubt prevented the weaker ones from giving
way under the continual strain.
17 October 1917.

== Football ==
He only began playing football when serving overseas with the AIF; and, on his return to Australia, he started playing football with two clubs, Shepparton and Lilydale in the Yarra Valley Football Association.

"Horrie Gorringe, the solid little Tasmanian, is the finest rover I have ever seen. I could describe him in three words — the perfect footballer …
Second to Gorringe I would place Frank Maher, former Essendon rover and brainy little tactician.
Maher made a study of football, and his brilliance, pace, tricks and anticipation were all backed glorious passes which, literally speaking, went down a comrade's throat.
Maher came out of a crush and instinctively put the ball in the right direction — always to the best advantage of his side.
He had a swerve that invariably got him out of trouble.
Never at any time did he play the man, and he hated to give away a free kick.
His play left nothing to be desired.
In my opinion Maher was second to Gorringe only because he did not have the strength and physique of the Tasmanian."
306-game Collingwood champion Gordon Coventry, 1938.

=== Essendon (VFL) ===
In the 1921 pre-season, he trained impressively with Carlton; however, once it was established that he resided in Essendon's territory, he signed with Essendon. Recruited from Lilydale Football Club, he played his first game for Essendon in 1921, at the advanced age of 25, against Carlton at the East Melbourne Cricket Ground on 11 June 1921.

==== "Mosquito Fleet" ====
Maher was only 5'6" tall; and, along with six others — Jack Garden (5'5"), Charlie Hardy (5'3"), Vince Irwin (5'6"), George "Tich" Shorten (5'5"), Jimmy Sullivan (5'6"), and Rowley Watt (5'4") — Maher was one of Essendon's legendary "mosquito fleet". According to some, there were another two Essendon players that were diminutive enough to be considered to be "mosquitoes": Garnet Campbell (5'7½"), and Greg Stockdale (5'8").

The term "mosquito fleet" was drawn by analogy from a maritime expression relating to particular assemblies of small vessels (e.g., the South Australian "mosquito fleet", the Queensland "mosquito fleet", a number of different U.S. "mosquito fleets", etc.).

==== Career ====
He played 137 games with Essendon Football Club from 1921 to 1928. The last 118 of those games — from round 12 in 1922 to round 17 in 1928 inclusive (he did not play in the last match of the 1928 season, "[having] requested the selectors not to consider him for the match as he was not in form") — were played consecutively.

He was first rover (with 2 goals) in the 1923 premiership team, and played on the half-forward flank (with 4 goals in the three matches) in the team that won the 1924 (round-robin) premiership.

Maher was captain-coach of Essendon in 1927; and, although his application to coach Essendon in 1928 was rejected, he captained Essendon in that year.

==== Victorian representative player ====
He represented Victoria on nine occasions in 1921, 1922, 1923, 1925, 1926, 1927 (captain), and 1928 (captain).

Maher, was captain of the Victorian Football League representative team that played against the Ovens and Murray Football League in Wangaratta in June, 1928 and praised a 16 year old Haydn Bunton (O&MFL) after the games as a player "who could hold his own in any league team".

==== Brownlow medal (third place) ====
He polled strongly in the 1925 Brownlow Medal, coming in third place with four votes.

=== Oakleigh (VFA) ===
Late in 1928, the VFA decided to expand its number of teams from ten to twelve. Oakleigh and Sandringham were chosen to take part in the 1929 VFA competition.

In 1929 Maher was cleared from Essendon to serve as Oakleigh's captain-coach for its first season in the VFA. He was paid £9 per week; "a huge fee at this time" — "it was double the basic wage". Recruiting Maher also meant that Oakleigh — with Maher as its first rover, and ex-Richmond George Rudolph and ex-Geelong Eric Fleming as its followers — had a formidable first ruck combination.

Oakleigh won two VFA premiership with Maher as its captain-coach: the first in 1930, when it defeated Northcote in a fiery match, and in 1931, when it, again, defeated Northcote.

=== Fitzroy (VFL) ===
He left Oakleigh at the end of 1931, and having been selected ahead of fourteen other applicants, he was appointed the non-playing coach of Fitzroy in 1932, and served as coach for two seasons, 1932 and 1933. He was replaced as coach in 1933, by Jack Cashman, due to the club's decision to appoint a playing coach. Ironically, Cashman resigned after serving only two games as Fitzroy's captain-coach, citing difficulties with members and supporters of the club, and was immediately cleared to Carlton.

=== Oakleigh (VFA) ===
Once it was made known that Maher was not continuing as Fitzroy's coach, Oakleigh appointed him as its non-playing coach for the 1934 season.

=== Carlton (VFL) ===
Rejecting offers to return to coach Fitzroy, Maher coached the Carlton Football Club in 1935 and in 1936. He was unable to continue coaching in 1937 due to a move to Sydney in late 1936 to take up new position with his employer.

== General Motors-Holden ==
Originally employed with the Commonwealth Statistician, Maher resigned from the public service in 1928 when the Statistician's Office was transferred from Melbourne to Canberra. He immediately transferred to General Motors; and, in late 1936, he was promoted to a position with General Motors in Sydney. In 1946, he was appointed Victorian sales manager of General Motors-Holden's Limited.

== Essendon Past Players & Officials Association ==
He was president of Essendon's past players and officials association (1958–1968).

== Death ==
He died on 7 November 1976.

== See also ==
- 1927 Melbourne Carnival
- Essendon Football Club's Team of the Century
