= Eric Cock =

Australian rules footballer (1902–1965)

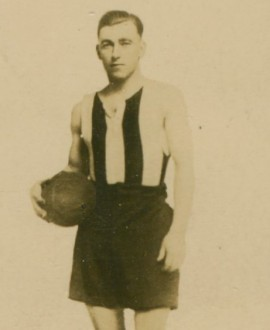
- Cock during his Collingwood career

Personal information
- Full name: Eric Francis Cock
- Born: 1 July 1902; Clifton Hill, Victoria
- Died: 24 May 1965 (aged 62); West Preston, Victoria
- Original team: Collingwood District
- Height: 165 cm (5 ft 5 in)
- Weight: 60 kg (132 lb)

Playing career^{1}
Years	Club	Games (Goals)
1922–1924	Collingwood	36 (40)
- ^{1} Playing statistics correct to the end of 1924.

Eric Francis Cock (1 July 1902 – 24 May 1965) was an Australian rules footballer who played for the Collingwood Football Club in the Victorian Football League (VFL) and for the Northcote Football Club in the Victorian Football Association (VFA).

== Family ==
The son of former Fitzroy (VFA) footballer (1884-1887), and former Fitzroy Football Club Secretary, Charles Sidney Cock (1858–1929), and Alice Annie Cock (1858–1922), née Kerr, Eric Francis Cock was born at Clifton Hill, Victoria on 1 July 1902. One of his brothers, Arthur Edwin Cock (1900-1966), was also a talented footballer.

He married Beryl Louise White (1904-1987) at Clifton Hill on 11 February 1928. They had three children.

== Education ==
He was educated at Gold Street State School (No.1360), in Clifton Hill — as was Len Fitzgerald, Reynolds Webb, Leo Wescott, etc. — and later at Scotch College, then in East Melbourne.

== Football ==
Originally with Scotch College, he played for a year with Collingwood District.

=== Collingwood (VFL) ===
He made his debut for Collingwood, against Carlton, at Victoria Park, on 20 May 1922. He soon became a regular selection.

He was a member of the Collingwood team that was defeated 11.13 (79) to 9.14 (68) by Fitzroy in the 1922 VFL Grand Final; and, in total, over his three seasons, he played 36 games (40 goals) for Collingwood; with his last match, in which he scored 4 goals, against Melbourne, at Victoria Park, on 12 July 1924.

=== Collingwood's 1924 mid-season tour ===
On 16 July 1924, as part of the team's mid-season tour, Collingwood played against a combined South Western District Football League (SWDFL) team at Narrandera, of the Riverina region of New South Wales, and, on Saturday, 19 July 1924, with Collingwood having a bye (the 1924 VFL competition had nine teams), it played against a combined Goulburn Valley Football League (GBFL) team, at Shepparton, in North-East Victoria.

=== 19 July 1924 ===
On Saturday, 19 July 1924, Cock and his Collingwood First XVIII team-mate Leo Wescott (neither of whom were part of the team's mid-year tour), were loaned to the local Collingwood District team. Cock's right knee was badly injured in the match. That same evening, unaware that he had been injured in the non-VFL match, the VFL selectors picked Cock for both the Victorian team to play South Australia in Melbourne on 9 August 1924, and the Victorian team to play South Australia in the return match in Adelaide on 16 August 1924.

MAGPIES' BAD LUCK
Eric Cock Injured
As the senior team had the bye Wescott and Cock transferred to the Colllngwood District team, to help them in their game against Coburg. The move was disastrous from the point of view of the senior side, in that the game had hardly begun when Eric Cock fell heavily in a crush and was carried from the ground. It was afterwards found that his knee had been severely twisted, and removal to the hospital was necessary. Cock, by his consistent form roving and forward, has been one of the mainstays of the Collingwood team and his enforced absence from the side will be severely felt. He has been chosen to play against South Australia on August 3 and 16. — The Herald, 21 July 1924.

=== Retirement ===
Although hoping to return to the team, his knee never recovered (post-cartilage removal) sufficiently for him ever to play senior VFL football again. He officially retired in 1926.

=== Melbourne (VFL) ===
On 23 May 1928, he was granted a clearance from Collingwood to Melbourne, having umpired in the VFL Seconds in the interim. There is no indication that he ever played football with Melbourne at any level in 1928.

=== Northcote (VFA) ===
He played in two senior games with Northcote in the VFA in 1929: against Yarraville on 25 May 1929, and against Coburg on 1 June 1929, a match in which he suffered an "injured instep".

== Cricket ==
He was also a talented cricketer. On one occasion, in November 1929, playing for the Clifton Hill Cricket Club against Fitzroy B, in the Metropolitan Cricket League, he scored a competition-record-breaking 248 not out.

== Wartime service ==
During World War II, he served with the R.S.L. Volunteer Defense Corps.

== Death ==
He died at his residence at West Preston, Victoria, on 24 May 1965.
