= George Rudolph =

Australian rules footballer (1901–1967)

Personal information
- Full name: George Ernest Rudolph
- Born: 29 April 1901; Steiglitz, Victoria
- Died: 1 April 1967 (aged 65); Tasmania
- Original team: Hawthorn (VFA)
- Height: 185 cm (6 ft 1 in)
- Weight: 92 kg (203 lb)
- Position: Follower

Playing career^{1}
Years	Club	Games (Goals)
1922, 1924–28	Richmond	80 (61)
- ^{1} Playing statistics correct to the end of 1928.

George Ernest Rudolph (29 April 1901 – 1 April 1967) was an Australian rules footballer who played for Richmond in the Victorian Football League (VFL) during the 1920s.

== Family ==
The son of Frank Rudolph and Eliza Rudolph, née Barrett, George Ernest Rudolph was born in Steiglitz, Victoria on 29 April 1901.

He married Edna Mary Maud White (1904–) on 14 April 1928.

== Football ==
Said to be an idol of Richmond great Jack Dyer, Rudolph was a follower, who played originally with Hawthorn in the Victorian Football Association (VFA), but was also used in key positions.

=== Hawthorn (VFA) ===
Having played with Camberwell Districts (1917), and with the East Burwood Football Club in 1918 and 1919, he was recruited by the VFA club Hawthorn. He played his first match on 10 July 1920 and played a total of 13 games, scoring seven goals in two seasons.

=== Richmond (VFL) ===
Granted a permit in May 1922, by Hawthorn to play with Richmond, Rudolph only played three matches with the Richmond First XVIII before he left to play country football.

=== St. James ===
On leaving Richmond, he played with the St. James Football Club in the Benalla-Yarrawonga Line Football Association for the remainder of the 1922 season.

=== Lang Lang ===
In 1923, he played with the Lang Lang Football Club, coached by Harry Harker, in the Berwick District Football Association.

Vic. Thorp remembers George Rudolph

"In a match against New South Wales occurred one of the most
comical incidents I have seen.
George Rudolph, a regular outlaw to football convention, stood
at one end of the ground smoking a cigarette while the game was
in progress.
The ball was kicked to him.
He took a one-handed mark, holding the precious cigarette in
the other.
Then turning sharply, he collided with the umpire and knocked
him cold.
There stood George; a cigarette in one hand, and the ball in
the other, looking down at the prostrate umpire.
Pivoting on his heels, Georgc kicked the ball through the goals,
put the cigarette in his mouth, and then stooped down and
picked up the umpire."
Vic. Thorp, The Sporting Globe, 17 September 1938.

=== Richmond (VFL) ===
He returned to Richmond in 1924.

On 2 May 1925, he was one of the Richmond team that played against his old club, Hawthorn, in its first-ever VFL match (Footscray, Hawthorn and North Melbourne were admitted to the VFL competition in 1925 season).

A Victorian interstate representative, he appeared in seven finals over the course of his career, including the 1927 VFL Grand Final and 1928 Grand Final. Rudolph played both premiership deciders from centre half-forward but Richmond didn't win either.

=== Oakleigh (VFA) ===
In 1929, two new teams, Oakleigh and Sandringham, were admitted to the Victorian Football Association (VFA) competition.

Along with Geelong's Eric Fleming, St Kilda's Wal Gunnyon, Essendon's Frank Maher and Chris Gomez, and Richmond's Fred Goding, Rudolph went to the Oakleigh in 1929 without a clearance from the VFL (in doing so, all of them were automatically disqualified from the VFL for three years). However, another ex-Essendon player, Vince Irwin, who also went to Oakleigh in 1929, did receive a clearance from South Bendigo Football Club, with whom he had played in the Bendigo Football League (BFL) in 1927 and 1928.

Rudolph was a member of Oakleigh's inaugural VFA premiership teams in 1930 and 1931, as a centre half-back in the latter.

=== Coburg (VFA) ===
In 1932, Oakleigh appointed ex-Collingwood footballer Harry Chesswas as its captain-coach; and, in 1933, in promoting Eric Fleming to the position of the team's captain-coach, the club also informed Rudolph that "should he desire a clearance to any other club it would be granted on his application".

Oakleigh cleared Rudolph cleared to Coburg in March 1933. He played in 24 games as centre half-back that season, including the ferocious Grand Final—eight players, including Rudolph, were reported for 14 different offences—in which Coburg lost to Northcote, 9.16 (70) to 11.21 (87).

Rudolph was appointed captain-coach of Coburg in 1934.

=== New Town (TFL) ===
In 1936, he moved to Tasmania, and played with the New Town Football Club in the Tasmanian Football League (TFL).

In his last match (against North Hobart on 19 August 1939), he was reported, found guilty of the charge, and suspended for one week. Without Rudolph in its team, New Town lost the 16 August 1939 elimination final match to Lefroy, 8.10 (58) to 9.11 (65).

Due to his enlistment in the Second AIF in June 1940, he was no longer available for selection at New Town. In 1940 he was the coach of various AIF teams in Tasmania.

== Reports and suspensions ==
According to Hogan (1996, p. 200), Rudolph was "a fiery player [who] came under the notice of umpires on several occasions receiving a total of 61 weeks in suspensions in his career".

- 1925 (Richmond): charged with striking St Kilda's Frank Scully on 18 July 1925.
  - The charge was dismissed.
- 1925 (Richmond): charged with striking St Kilda's John Lord on 18 July 1925.
  - Rudolph was found guilty and was suspended for 6 matches.
- 1926 (Richmond): charged with having used obscene language to Carlton's Jim Watson on 3 July 1926.
  - Rudolph was found guilty and was suspended for two matches.
- 1927 (Richmond): charged with kicking Fitzroy's George Gordon on 9 July 1927.
  - The charge was dismissed.
- 1928 (Richmond): charged with unseemly conduct in having thrown the football at Geelong's Eric Fleming on 1 September 1928.
  - The charge was dismissed.
- 1930 (Oakleigh): charged with tripping Coburg's Hugh Donnelly on 21 June 1930. The charge was dismissed.
- 1933 (Coburg): charged with striking Williamstown's Cairo Dixon on 6 May 1939.
  - Although sustaining the charge, the Tribunal acknowledged that Rudolph had been provoked and decided that, under the circumstances, "[although] a penalty of two weeks suspension would be recorded, … it would be suspended subject to no charge being brought against him and proved within a period of two years".
- 1933 (Coburg): Eight players were charged with sixteen offences committed during the fiery 1933 VFA Grand Final in which Coburg 9.16 (70) and Northcote Football Club on 7 October 1933.
  - Rudolph was charged with four offences (the tribunal noted that, in the course of the match, "Rudolph had received great provocation"):
    - kicking Northcote's captain-coach Percy Rowe in the second quarter (Rowe was charged with striking Rudolph in the second quarter). The charge against Rudolph was not sustained (Rowe was suspended for one week).
    - striking Northcote's Eddie M. Bray in the last quarter (Bray was charged with striking Rudolph in the last quarter). Rudolph was found guilty, and suspended for one week. (Bray, who was also reported for striking the Coburg captain-coach, Greg Stockdale, was found guilty of both offences and suspended for a total of six weeks).
    - striking Northcote's Tommy Corrigan in the last quarter (Corrigan was charged with striking Rudolph in the last quarter). Rudolph was found guilty, and suspended for one week.
    - striking Northcote's Ralph Goullet in the last quarter. Rudolph was found guilty, and suspended for one week.
- 1934 (Coburg): charged with kicking Preston's Robert W. Cameron in the third quarter of the 1934 VFA Preliminary Final match on 22 September 1934.
  - Rudolph was found guilty and was suspended until July 1936.
- 1936 (New Town): charged with elbowing Lefroy's W. Humphreys on 18 July 1936. Rudolph was found guilty and was suspended for four matches.
  - On 27 July 1936 an appeal was lodged against the verdict. The appeal was subsequently rejected.
- 1939 (New Town): charged with striking North Hobart's Raymond Percival Carr on 19 August 1939.
  - Rudolph was found guilty and was suspended for one match.

== Cricket ==
He played in six matches with the Fitzroy Cricket Club's First XI in the District Cricket Competition in between 1932 and 1935. "George was also a fine fast bowler [for Fitzroy] … [who] scored 21 runs with a highest score of 12 and took 6 wickets".

== Military service ==
He enlisted in the Second AIF in 1940, and served in the Army Service Corps. He was discharged in 1944.

== See also ==
- 1927 Melbourne Carnival
