= Jack Jobson =

Australian rules footballer

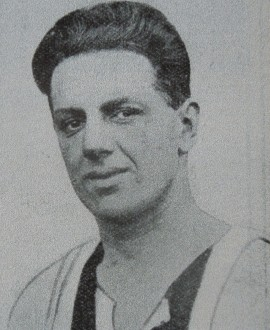
- Jobson during his Collingwood career

Personal information
- Full name: John Francis Jobson
- Born: 30 July 1899; Fitzroy, Victoria
- Died: 22 November 1955 (aged 56); Ascot Vale, Victoria
- Original team: Richmond District
- Height: 178 cm (5 ft 10 in)
- Weight: 80 kg (176 lb)

Playing career^{1}
Years	Club	Games (Goals)
1924–1925	Collingwood	6 (2)
1926	Hawthorn	1 (0)
1928	Northcote (VFA)	7 (1)
Total		14 (3)
- ^{1} Playing statistics correct to the end of 1928.

John Francis Jobson (30 July 1899 – 22 November 1955) was a former Australian rules footballer who played with Collingwood and Hawthorn in the Victorian Football League (VFL).

== Family ==
The son of Thomas Jobson (1873–1944) and Mary Eliza Jobson (1874–1960), nee Anderson, John Francis Jobson was born at Fitzroy on 30 July 1899.

== Football ==
Joining Collingwood from Richmond District in July 1924 Jobson played in five consecutive games before being suspended for elbowing Steve Donnellan of Fitzroy.

Jobson made one appearance for Collingwood in 1925, unsuccessfully applied for a clearance to North Melbourne, before joining Hawthorn for the 1926 VFL season. He made only one appearance before returning to Collingwood but he failed to play another senior game. Jobson played for Northcote in 1928 but returned to Collingwood again in 1929.

== World War II ==
Jobson enlisted in the Australian Army in June 1940 and served in both the Middle East and New Guinea.

== Death ==
Jack Jobson died at Ascot Vale on 22 November 1955 and is buried at Fawkner Memorial Park.
