= Ralph Gardiner =

Ralph Gardiner may refer to:

- Ralph Gardiner (umpire)
- Ralph Gardiner (footballer)

== See also ==
- Ralph Gardner Jr., American writer, author, and radio commentator
