= Eric Donaldson (disambiguation) =

Eric Donaldson is a Jamaican reggae singer-songwriter.

Eric Donaldson may also refer to:

- Eric Donaldson (footballer, born 1898) (1898–1964), Australian rules footballer for St. Kilda
- Eric Donaldson (footballer, born 1899) (1899–1986), Australian rules footballer for Melbourne
