= 1924 VFA season =

1924 VFA premiership season
- Teams: 10
- Premiers: Footscray; 9th premiership
- Minor premiers: Footscray; 8th minor premiership

The 1924 Victorian Football Association season was the 46th season of the Australian rules football competition. The premiership was won by the Footscray Football Club, after it defeated Williamstown by 45 points in the final on 20 September. It was the club's ninth and last VFA premiership before it, along with North Melbourne and Hawthorn, joined the Victorian Football League the following year; this marked the end of a long period of dominance for Footscray, which had seen it win five minor premierships in a row and four major premierships in six years.

== Premiership ==
The home-and-home season was played over eighteen rounds, with each club playing the others twice; then, the top four clubs contested a finals series under the amended Argus system to determine the premiers for the season.

=== Ladder ===
1924 VFA ladder
Pos	Team	Pld	W	L	D	PF	PA	PP	Pts
1	Footscray (P)	18	16	1	1	1484	916	61.7	66
2	Williamstown	18	13	5	0	1197	944	78.9	52
3	Northcote	18	11	6	1	1315	1176	89.4	46
4	Brunswick	18	11	7	0	1380	1016	73.6	44
5	North Melbourne	18	10	8	0	1282	1025	80.0	40
6	Hawthorn	18	10	8	0	1283	1058	82.5	40
7	Port Melbourne	18	10	8	0	1277	1179	92.3	40
8	Geelong (A)	18	4	14	0	933	1485	159.2	16
9	Brighton	18	2	16	0	1090	1422	130.5	8
10	Prahran	18	2	16	0	797	1818	228.1	8

Rules for classification: 1) points; 2) percentage; 3) number of points for.
(P) Premiers

=== Finals ===
	Semifinals
Saturday, 6 September	Williamstown 8.9 (57)	def.	Brunswick 5.16 (46)	North Melbourne Recreation Reserve (crowd: 16,000)
Saturday, 13 September	Footscray 9.7 (61)	def.	Northcote 4.8 (32)	North Melbourne Recreation Reserve (crowd: 16,000)

1924 VFA Final
Saturday, 20 September	Footscray	def.	Williamstown	North Melbourne Recreation Reserve (crowd: 15,000)
3.5 (23); 4.6 (30); 9.9 (63); 11.11 (77)	Q1; Q2; Q3; Final	0.1 (1); 0.4 (4); 0.4 (4); 3.4 (22)	Umpires: Leheny
Mullens 5, O'Brien 4, Hopkins 2,	Goals	Munn 2, Britt
Had Williamstown won, minor premiers Footscray would have been entitled to a rematch the following Saturday to decide the premiership.

== Notable events ==
- Prior to the season, the V.F.A. became affiliated with the Victorian Junior Football Association. Under the arrangement, each of the junior clubs which served as a seconds team for a V.F.A. club joined the V.J.F.A; and, the V.J.F.A expanded to eighteen clubs in two divisions. The V.J.F.A. would end up becoming the V.F.A. seconds competition over the following few years.
- On 2 August, a combined Association team played against the visiting Perth Football Club team at the North Melbourne Recreation Reserve. Perth 5.8 (38) defeated the Association 4.12 (36) by two points.
- George Gough (Northcote) kicked 25 goals and 7 behinds in Northcote's match against Prahran in the final round of home-and-home matches on August 30. Gough broke the Association record of 18 goals in a match, scored by Dave McNamara (Essendon (A.)) in 1912, and broke the national record of 23 goals in a top level senior match, set by Bos Daly (Norwood) in 1893 and matched by Hugh Campbell (Western Australia) in 1924. Gough scored eleven goals in the final quarter.
- George Gough was the Association's leading goalscorer for the year, finishing with eighty goals in the home-and-home season.
- Bob Johnson (Northcote) won the Woodham Cup as the best and fairest player in the Association.
- Two clubs completed extremely long home winning streaks during the season: Footscray left the Association at the end of the season, after being unbeaten at the Western Oval in 47 consecutive matches; and Port Melbourne was beaten at the Port Melbourne Cricket Ground for the first time since 1920, ending a 33-match winning streak.
- Premiers Footscray played off against League premiers Essendon on 4 October in an exhibition match for Dame Nellie Melba's appeal for Limbless Soldiers. It was only the third match between League and Association teams since the breakaway of the League in 1897. Footscray 9.10 (64) defeated Essendon 4.12 (36) by 28 points.

== See also ==
- List of VFA premiers
