= Laurie Murphy =

Australian rules footballer and coach

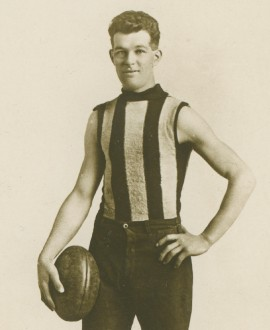
- Murphy during his Collingwood career

Personal information
- Full name: Laurence J. B. Murphy
- Born: 10 September 1899
- Died: 20 July 1980 (aged 80)
- Original team: Ivanhoe
- Height: 183 cm (6 ft 0 in)
- Weight: 83 kg (183 lb)

Playing career^{1}
Years	Club	Games (Goals)
1921–1926	Collingwood	78 (14)
1928–1929	North Melbourne	15 (3)
Total		93 (17)
- ^{1} Playing statistics correct to the end of 1929.

Laurie Murphy (10 September 1899 – 20 July 1980) was an Australian rules footballer who played with Collingwood and North Melbourne in the Victorian Football League (VFL).

Recruited out of the Diamond Valley, Murphy was both a defender and follower. Murphy appeared in Collingwood's losing 1922 VFL Grand Final and 1925 VFL Grand Final sides. He represented Victoria three times. Murphy was coach of the Warrnambool Football Club in 1930.
