= Jim Tarbotton =

Australian rules footballer

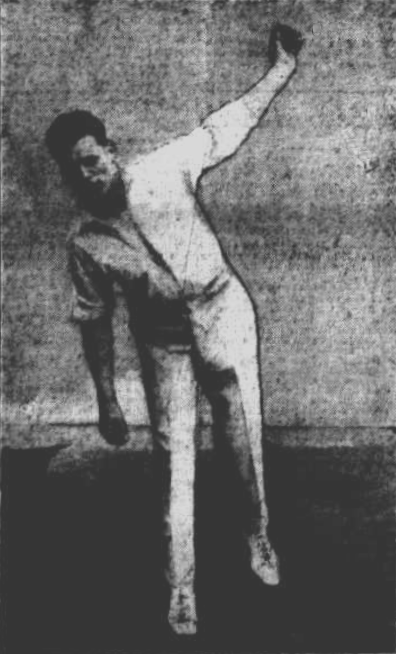

Personal information
- Full name: James Harold Tarbotton
- Born: 5 May 1899; Bradford, England
- Died: 4 April 1997 (aged 97)
- Original team: Railways (Sydney)
- Height: 185 cm (6 ft 1 in)
- Weight: 86 kg (190 lb)

Playing career^{1}
Years	Club	Games (Goals)
1923–1926	Fitzroy	37 (1)
- ^{1} Playing statistics correct to the end of 1926.

James Harold Tarbotton, a.k.a. Tarbolton (5 May 1899 – 4 April 1997) was an Australian rules footballer who played with Fitzroy in the Victorian Football League (VFL).

== Family ==
The son of James Thorpe Tarbotton (1856-1942), and Mary Stuart Tarbotton (1857-1946), née MacLaurin, James Harold Tarbotton was born at Bradford, England on 5 May 1899.

He married Nita Agnes Banks (1901-1946) in 1923.

== World War I ==
Tarbotton, then living in Sydney, enlisted to serve in the Australian Army in July 1916, falsifying his mother’s signature on his enlistment papers and lying about his age. When his mother discovered his deception, she wrote to the War Office and he was discharged in December 1916. In March 1917 Tarbotton re-enlisted the 1st AIF and served in the Middle East during the later stages of the war.

== Football ==
Tarbotton came to Fitzroy from the Railways club in Sydney. He was on a half back flank for Fitzroy in the 1923 VFL Grand Final, which they lost to Essendon.

== World War II ==
Tarbotton later served in the Australian Army during World War II.
