= Arch Dickens =

Australian rules footballer, born 1903

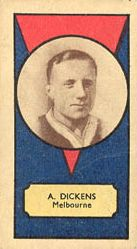

Personal information
- Full name: Harold Arthur Dickens
- Born: 19 June 1903; Preston, Victoria
- Died: 25 May 1996 (aged 92)
- Original team: Preston
- Height: 165 cm (5 ft 5 in)
- Weight: 65 kg (143 lb)

Playing career^{1}
Years	Club	Games (Goals)
1923–1931	Fitzroy	64 (24)
1932	Melbourne	13 (7)
Total		77 (31)
- ^{1} Playing statistics correct to the end of 1932.

Harold Arthur "Arch" Dickens (19 June 1903 – 25 May 1996) was an Australian rules footballer who played with Fitzroy and Melbourne in the Victorian Football League (VFL).

Dickens was recruited from Preston. He played on a wing for Fitzroy in their 1923 VFL Grand Final loss to Essendon. He was one of the last players to use the place kick when kicking for goal.
