= Tom Fitzmaurice =

Australian rules footballer and coach

Personal information
- Full name: Thomas Joseph Cullinan Fitzmaurice
- Born: 7 July 1898; Fitzroy North, Victoria
- Died: 25 December 1977 (aged 79); Heidelberg, Victoria
- Original team: Essendon CYMS (CYMSFA)
- Height: 6 ft 4 in (192 cm)
- Weight: 15 st 2 lb (96 kg)
- Position: Defender / Forward

Playing career^{1}
Years	Club	Games (Goals)
1918–1924	Essendon	85 (30)
1925–1928	Geelong	49 (20)
1930–1931	Yarraville (VFA)	34 (37)
1932–1935	North Melbourne	54 (196)
1935	Brunswick (VFA)	4 (6)
Total		224 (289)

Coaching career
Years	Club	Games (W–L–D)
1928	Geelong	18 (6–12–0)
1934–1935	North Melbourne	16 (0–16–0)
Total		34 (6–28–0)
- ^{1} Playing statistics correct to the end of 1935.

Career highlights
- Essendon premierships 1923, 1924; Essendon best and fairest 1922, 1923, 1924; Essendon Team of the Century; Geelong premiership 1925; Geelong captain-coach 1928; North Melbourne joint captain-coach 1934–1935; North Melbourne leading goalkicker 1932–1934; Victorian representative 12 matches; New South Wales representative 1 match

Thomas Joseph Cullinan Fitzmaurice (7 July 1898 – 25 December 1977) was an Australian rules footballer in the Victorian Football League (VFL).

== Football ==
A brilliant centre-half-back, he commenced his career with Essendon Football Club 1918. Transferred to Sydney in 1921 with his employment, Fitzmaurice played that season in the local competition and captained New South Wales against Victoria and Tasmania. He rejoined Essendon in 1922 and later formed part of their very successful 1923 and 1924 premiership teams. In the famous Essendon "mosquito fleet" (so called because of the half-dozen players 5 feet 6 inches or 168 centimetres or shorter), Fitzmaurice was the tallest member of the side at 6 feet 2 inches or 189 centimetres.

Fitzmaurice left Essendon after the controversy at the end of the 1924 season when he felt that several Essendon players had deliberately lost a match against Victorian Football Association premiers Footscray.

He played in a premiership team at Geelong Football Club in his first year. Leaving Geelong after 1928, he played with Mortlake and then VFA club Yarraville. He returned to the VFL in 1932, playing with North Melbourne. Moving to the forward lines he became their leading goalkicker for three seasons.

He took over the coaching position at North after Dick Taylor resigned in disgust in mid-1934. He had eight games to turn the club around, but they didn't win any games. Re-appointed for 1935, Fitzmaurice resigned a broken man after a winless eight rounds. The last straw was an insipid effort against eventual premiers Collingwood.

In 1936, he agreed to be a committeeman at Essendon. After twelve months he decided to play again, this time in Penguin, Tasmania.

== Hall of Fame ==
In 1996, Fitzmaurice was inducted into the Australian Football Hall of Fame.

== Champions of Essendon ==
In 1997, Fitzmaurice was included in Essendon's inaugural Team of the Century.

In 2002, an Essendon panel ranked him at 10 in their Champions of Essendon list of the 25 greatest players ever to have played for Essendon.
