= George Bolt (footballer) =

Australian rules footballer

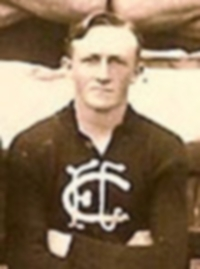
- Bailey in 1922

Personal information
- Full name: George James Bolt
- Born: 1 August 1899; Rutherglen, Victoria, Australia
- Died: 2 September 1966 (aged 67); Ripponlea, Victoria, Australia
- Original team: Brunswick (VFA)
- Height: 170 cm (5 ft 7 in)
- Weight: 68 kg (150 lb)
- Position: Rover / forward

Playing career^{1}
| Years | Club | Games (Goals) |
| 1922–1923 | Carlton | 18 (1) |
| 1925 | Hawthorn | 8 (0) |
| 1926–1927 | North Melbourne | 16 (0) |
| Total | | 42 (1) |
- ^{1} Playing statistics correct to the end of 1927.

George James Bolt (1 August 1899 – 2 September 1966) was an Australian rules footballer who played with Carlton, Hawthorn and North Melbourne in the Victorian Football League (VFL).

== Family ==
The son of Francis Bolt (1865–1950), and Catherine Ann Bolt (1868–1954), née Waite, George James Bolt was born at Rutherglen on 1 August 1899.

Bolt married Violet Maria McLaine (1900–1928) in 1921, and they had two children together before her death in 1928. He subsequently married Violet's older sister, Jessie Marjorie McLaine (1895–1960) in 1936.

== Football ==
=== Carlton ===
Bolt joined Carlton from Brunswick in the Victorian Football Association in 1922, although he did not play a senior game for Brunswick.

Carlton had a poor season in 1923 and dissension among the playing group broke into the open after Round 13 when Carlton suffered a heavy defeat to Essendon.

At an after-match function at the Essendon Football Club, Bolt and his team-mate Jack Morrissey became embroiled in a heated argument that culminated in a fist fight between the two. The next day, Sunday, the club committee met and suspended both players for an indefinite period, bringing an end to Bolt's Carlton career.

=== Hawthorn ===
An application to transfer to Richmond in 1924 was refused, and he played with Auburn Football Club in the Reporter League and the Railways club in the Wednesday league until mid 1925 when he was cleared to Hawthorn, where he played the last eight matches in their VFL debut season.

=== North Melbourne ===
Bolt subsequently moved to North Melbourne, and took his career games tally to 42 with another 16 matches in 1926–27.

== Death ==
George Bolt died on 2 September 1966, aged 67, and is buried at Fawkner Memorial Park.
