= Arthur Cock =

Australian rules footballer

Personal information
- Full name: Arthur Edwin Cock
- Born: 17 March 1900; Clifton Hill, Victoria
- Died: 10 September 1966 (aged 66); Box Hill, Victoria
- Original team: South Bendigo (BFL)

Playing career^{1}
Years	Club	Games (Goals)
1924	St Kilda	2 (0)
- ^{1} Playing statistics correct to the end of 1924.

Arthur Edwin Cock (17 March 1900 – 10 September 1966) was an Australian rules footballer who played for the Northcote Football Club in the Victorian Football Association (VFA), and for the St Kilda Football Club in the Victorian Football League (VFL).

== Family ==
The son of former Fitzroy (VFA) footballer (1884-1887), and former Fitzroy Football Club Secretary, Charles Sidney Cock (1858–1929), and Alice Annie Cock (1858–1922), née Kerr, Arthur Edwin Cock was born at Clifton Hill, Victoria on 17 March 1900.

His brother, Eric Francis Cock (1902–1965), played VFL football with Collingwood, and VFA football with Northcote.

== Football ==
=== Northcote VFA ===
He played in six matches for Northcote in the VFA competition in 1920, and, also, represented the VFA against a combined Goldfields Football Association (GFA) team, at Kalgoorlie, in August 1920.

=== St Kilda (VFL) ===
He played in two senior VFL matches for St Kilda in 1924.
