= Ern Elliott =

Australian rules footballer (1900–1980)

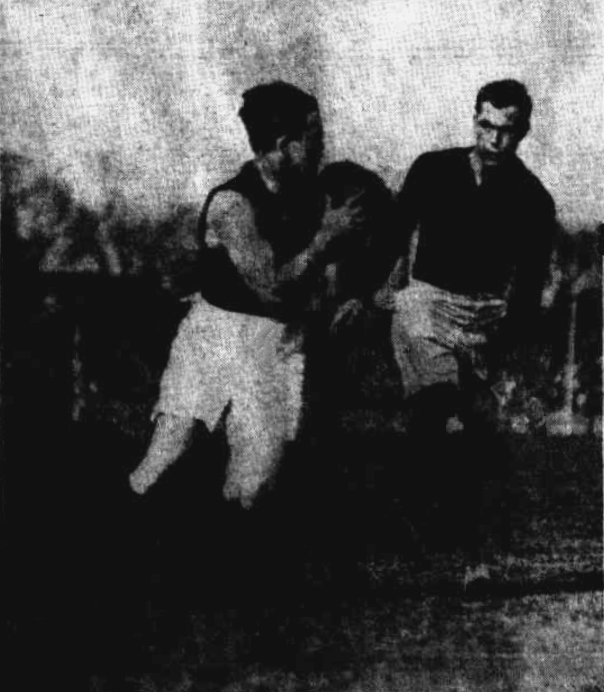
- Ern Elliott (back) chasing Jim Fraser, 1922.

Personal information
- Full name: Ernest George Elliott
- Born: 3 January 1900; South Melbourne, Victoria
- Died: 17 November 1980 (aged 80); Box Hill, Victoria
- Height: 175 cm (5 ft 9 in)
- Weight: 73 kg (161 lb)

Playing career^{1}
Years	Club	Games (Goals)
1921–1927	Fitzroy	95 (0)
- ^{1} Playing statistics correct to the end of 1927.

Ernest George "Puffer" Elliott (3 January 1900 – 17 November 1980) was an Australian rules footballer who played with Fitzroy in the Victorian Football League (VFL).

Elliott was a half back flanker in Fitzroy's 1922 VFL premiership winning side. He also played in the 1923 VFL Grand Final, but this time finished on the losing team.

An eight time VFL representative, he made appearances at the 1924 Hobart Carnival.

Elliott coached the Wangaratta Football Club in the Ovens & Murray Football League in 1928 and he later played with Camberwell in the Victorian Football Association (VFA).
