= Syd Barker Jr. =

Australian rules footballer

Personal information
- Full name: Sydney Quinton Barker, Junior
- Born: 15 October 1911; North Melbourne, Victoria, Australia
- Died: 7 March 1965 (aged 53)
- Height: 185 cm (6 ft 1 in)
- Weight: 84 kg (185 lb)

Playing career^{1}
Years	Club	Games (Goals)
1930–1933	North Melbourne	41 (4)
- ^{1} Playing statistics correct to the end of 1933.

Sydney Quinton Barker Jr. (15 October 1911 – 7 March 1965) was an Australian rules footballer who played with North Melbourne in the Victorian Football League (VFL).

Barker was born in North Melbourne on 15 October 1911. His father, Syd Barker Sr., was then playing for the North Melbourne Football Club in the Victorian Football Association and would go on to captain-coach the club in the VFL.

A follower, Barker was described as being sturdily built like his father, who died in March 1930. It was that year that Barker Junior joined the club and he made his debut in round 12, against St Kilda. He played in all of North Melbourne's remaining games that season and appeared in all 18 rounds of the 1931 VFL season. It was not until 1932 that he featured in a win, with North Melbourne having lost all 26 of his prior games. This is the longest streak of losses before a first win for any player who has not played for St Kilda or University. He played six games that year and another 10 in 1933, then was omitted from the North Melbourne list.

He sought a clearance to Essendon in 1934, for which he required a residential clearance from South Melbourne, as he lived in Middle Park. The clearance was granted by South Melbourne and he joined Essendon in June, but he would not get to appear in league football for his new club.
