= Norm Cockram =

Australian rules footballer

Personal information
- Full name: Norman John Cockram
- Born: 27 August 1899; Northcote, Victoria
- Died: 16 March 1973 (aged 73); Preston, Victoria
- Original team: Northcote
- Height: 178 cm (5 ft 10 in)
- Weight: 83 kg (183 lb)

Playing career^{1}
Years	Club	Games (Goals)
1922–1933	Fitzroy	120 (82)
- ^{1} Playing statistics correct to the end of 1933.

Norman Cockram (27 August 1899 – 16 March 1973) was an Australian rules footballer who played with Fitzroy in the Victorian Football League (VFL).

== Football ==
Cockram, a key position player, was originally from Northcote. He was Fitzroy's centre half-forward in their 1923 VFL Grand Final loss to Essendon.

Now playing as a fullback, Cockram returned to Northcote in 1929 and was a member of their premiership team that year.

In 1932 he resumed his VFL career and he retired the following year.

He was good enough to represent Victoria B on three occasions during his career.
