= Jim Fraser (Australian footballer) =

Australian rules footballer

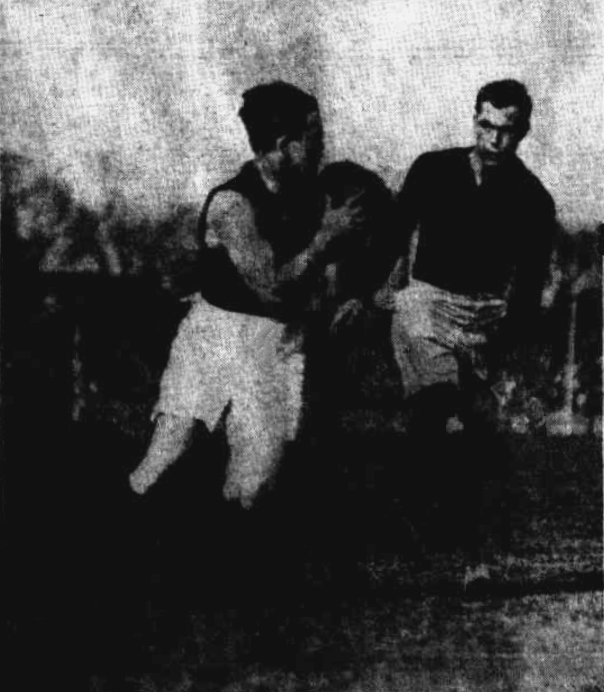
- Jim Fraser (front) evading Ern Elliott, 1922.

Personal information
- Full name: James Fraser
- Born: 21 December 1896; Mansfield, Victoria
- Died: 5 November 1975 (aged 78); Preston, Victoria
- Original team: Mansfield
- Height: 165 cm (5 ft 5 in)
- Weight: 80 kg (176 lb)

Playing career^{1}
Years	Club	Games (Goals)
1922–23	Carlton	14 (13)
- ^{1} Playing statistics correct to the end of 1923.

James Fraser, MM (21 December 1896 – 5 November 1975) was an Australian rules footballer who played with Carlton in the Victorian Football League (VFL).

Before his football career Fraser served with distinction in World War I, being awarded the Military Medal in October 1917 for "bravery in the field".
