= George Gough =

Australian rules footballer (1900–1952)

Personal information
- Full name: Daniel George Gough
- Born: 18 March 1900; Northcote, Victoria
- Died: 15 April 1952 (aged 52); Regent
- Original teams: Croxton I.O.R., Preston.
- Height: 177 cm (5 ft 10 in)
- Weight: 73 kg (161 lb)
- Position: Forward

Playing career^{1}
Years	Club	Games (Goals)
1919–1921	Fitzroy	23 (28)
1927–1928	Carlton	24 (66)
Total		47 (94)
- ^{1} Playing statistics correct to the end of 1928.

Daniel George Gough (18 March 1900 – 15 April 1952) was an Australian rules footballer who played for Fitzroy and Carlton in the Victorian Football League (VFL).

George Gough was one of these schoolboys who would one day be a competent footballer, he started as a youngster playing with the Croxton I.O.R. junior team, till 1918, when he came of age and transferred to Preston in the V.J.F.A. competition. Fitzroy recruited him the following year. Gough, a small forward, had the first of two separate stints in the VFL. He played mainly as a half-forward and rover but after three seasons he had enough of Fitzroy's coach so he crossed over to play for his local VFA side, Northcote.

He then turned out for Northcote playing at full forward. In his third season he topped the league's goal-kicking with 83 goals. His tally that year included a bag of 25 goals against Prahran which set a VFA record which has never been broken; it was his sole haul of ten or more goals in a game. He played a total of 91 matches for Northcote, kicking 276 goals.

In 1926 he was second in the league goalkicking for the year. He was so consistent that Carlton express keen interest in him. Gough was picked up by Carlton and started well by kicking five goals on his debut for the club. He finished the season with a tally of 30 goals and backed it up the following year with 36 goals, four of them in the Semi Final loss to Richmond. In his 24 games at Carlton, Gough went goal-less only once.

After two years with Carlton, Gough returned to Northcote in 1929 and played up the field on the wing. He lost his passion for the game and retired mid-season.

He was cleared to Preston for the 1930 season.

He died after a long illness, at his home in Regent.
