= Fred Williams (Australian footballer, born 1900) =

Australian rules footballer, born 1900

Personal information
- Full name: Frederick Watson Williams
- Born: 29 January 1900; North Melbourne, Victoria
- Died: 20 December 1975 (aged 75); Prahran, Victoria
- Original team: Melton
- Height: 173 cm (5 ft 8 in)
- Weight: 67 kg (148 lb)
- Position: Wingman

Playing career^{1}
Years	Club	Games (Goals)
1920–28	Fitzroy	106 (18)
1929–32	Carlton	46 (6)
Total		152 (24)
- ^{1} Playing statistics correct to the end of 1932.

Frederick Watson Williams (29 January 1900 – 20 December 1975) was an Australian rules footballer who played with Fitzroy and Carlton in the Victorian Football League (VFL).

== Football ==
Williams played his early football with Bacchus Marsh club Melton. A wingman, he spent most of the 1920s at Fitzroy and was a regular member of the team. He played in their 1922 premiership side and kicked his only goal of the year in the Grand Final. The following season he represented the VFL in an interstate match against South Australia. An injury cost him a place in the 1923 Grand Final and he finished his career at Carlton, where he appeared in two Preliminary Final losses, to bring his finals tally to 10.
