= HMAS Toorie =

History

Australia
- Name: Sir Arthur Dorman (1925-1928); Toorie (1928-1956)
- Owner: Dorman Long, Sydney (1925-1928); Adelaide Steamship Company (1928-1956)
- Builder: Walsh Island Dockyard and Engineering Works, Newcastle
- Launched: 27 April 1925
- Identification: UK Official Number: 152014
- Fate: Broken up in 1956

History

Australia
- Name: Toorie
- Commissioned: 14 January 1941
- Decommissioned: January 1943

General characteristics
- Tonnage: 414 gross register tons
- Length: 147 ft (45 m)
- Beam: 26.6 ft (8.1 m)
- Draught: 9.2 ft (2.8 m)
- Propulsion: Single screw triple expansion steam engine
- Speed: 8 knots (15 km/h; 9.2 mph)

HMAS Toorie was an auxiliary minesweeper operated by the Royal Australian Navy (RAN) during World War II.

Built in 1925 by the Walsh Island Dockyard and Engineering Works, Newcastle for Dorman Long, Sydney as Sir Arthur Dorman. She was sold in 1928 to the Adelaide Steamship Company ownership and renamed Toorie. She was utilised along the Queensland coast as a sugar lighter between shore to larger vessels offshore. Toorie requisitioned by the RAN in late 1940 and commissioned on 14 January 1941 as an auxiliary minesweeper. She was decommissioned in January 1943 and returned to her owners after reconversion work.

== Fate ==
Toorie was sold in 1956 and scrapped in Hong Kong.
