= Clive Fergie =

Australian rules footballer (1895–1960)

Personal information
- Full name: Clive Alfred Fergie
- Born: 20 December 1895; Williamstown, Victoria
- Died: 13 August 1960 (aged 64); Heidelberg, Victoria
- Original team: Scotch College
- Height: 168 cm (5 ft 6 in)
- Weight: 70 kg (154 lb)
- Position: Rover

Playing career^{1}
Years	Club	Games (Goals)
1915–16, 1919–24	Fitzroy	67 (42)
- ^{1} Playing statistics correct to the end of 1924.

Clive Alfred Fergie (20 December 1895 – 13 August 1960) was an Australian rules footballer who played with Fitzroy in the Victorian Football League (VFL).

Fergie played his early football at Scotch College before starting his league career in 1915. After appearing in the opening three rounds of the 1916 VFL season, he embarked for Europe to serve with the 3rd Machine Gun Battalion in the war and would fight on the Western Front. He was awarded both a British War Medal and Victory Medal for his war service.

He returned to Australia in 1919 and played seven games for Fitzroy that year. In 1922 he was Fitzroy's first rover in their premiership side and also played in their team which lost the 1923 VFL Grand Final.
