= Harold Carter (footballer) =

Australian rules footballer

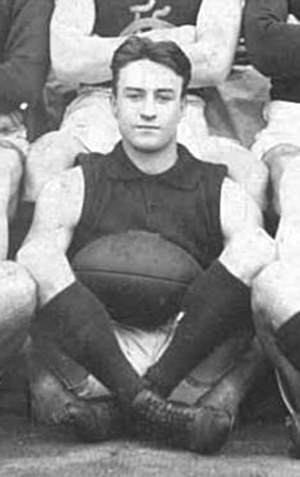
- Carter in 1926

Personal information
- Born: 29 March 1900; Bendigo, Victoria
- Died: 10 September 1973 (aged 73); Kew, Victoria
- Original team: South Bendigo (BFL)
- Height: 165 cm (5 ft 5 in)
- Weight: 62 kg (137 lb)

Playing career^{1}
Years	Club	Games (Goals)
1921–1923	Fitzroy	38 (34)
1924–1928	Carlton	63 (54)
Total		101 (88)
- ^{1} Playing statistics correct to the end of 1928.

Harold Carter (29 March 1900 – 10 September 1973) was an Australian rules footballer in the Victorian Football League (VFL).

After three seasons with Fitzroy, Carter moved to Carlton at the start of the 1924 season. He left the club at the end of the 1928 season.
