= Reynolds Webb =

Australian rules footballer, born 1900

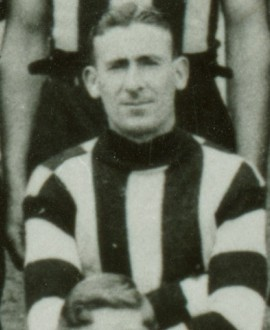
- Webb in 1922

Personal information
- Full name: Reynolds William Webb
- Born: 14 April 1900; Collingwood, Victoria
- Died: 22 June 1989 (aged 89); Kingsbury, Victoria
- Original team: Collingwood Districts
- Height: 170 cm (5 ft 7 in)
- Weight: 66 kg (146 lb)

Playing career^{1}
Years	Club	Games (Goals)
1921–1926	Collingwood	84 (65)
- ^{1} Playing statistics correct to the end of 1926.

Reynolds William Webb (14 April 1900 – 22 June 1989) was an Australian rules footballer who played with Collingwood in the Victorian Football League (VFL).

Webb was a rover and forward during his time at Collingwood.

He played in two losing grand finals, the 1922 VFL Grand Final and 1925 VFL Grand Final.

Webb represented the VFL in 1925, against New South Wales.
