= Justin McCarthy (footballer) =

Australian rules footballer

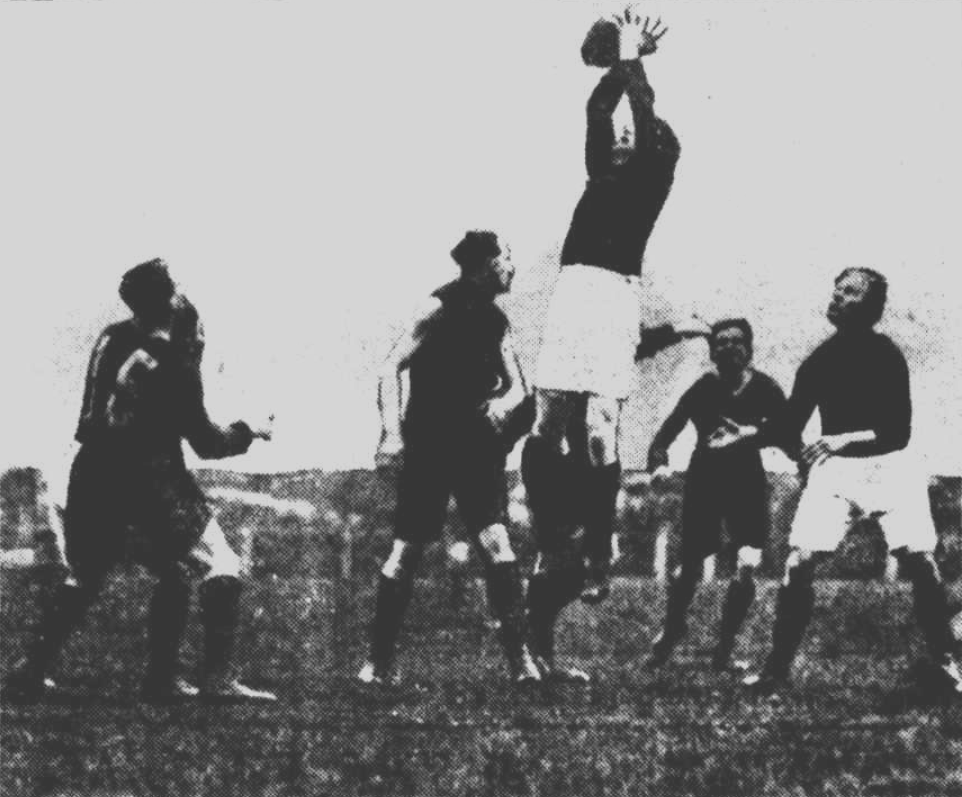
- McCarthy taking a mark, 1922.

Personal information
- Born: 22 September 1894; Alberton, Victoria
- Died: 26 February 1981 (aged 86); Prahran, Victoria
- Original team: Footscray (VFA)
- Debut: Round 11, 1913, Carlton vs. South Melbourne, at Lake Oval
- Height: 182 cm (6 ft 0 in)
- Weight: 81 kg (179 lb)

Playing career^{1}
Years	Club	Games (Goals)
1913–1914	Carlton	3 (2)
1915	Footscray (VFA)	1 (0)
1919–1921	Brighton (VFA)	34 (27)
1922–1926	Essendon	56 (60)
- ^{1} Playing statistics correct to the end of 1926.

Justin McCarthy (22 September 1894 – 26 February 1981) was an Australian rules footballer who played for Carlton and Essendon in the VFL before and after the First World War.

McCarthy played with Essendon during their 'Mosquito Fleet' era and was one of their taller players at 182 cm. He was used as a centre half forward, having his best season in 1923 when he kicked 23 goals including two in Essendon's grand final win over Fitzroy.
