= Clarrie Sherry =

Australian rules footballer

Personal information
- Full name: Clarence Alfred Woodward Sherry
- Born: 4 June 1895; Collingwood, Victoria
- Died: 19 April 1977 (aged 81); Templestowe, Victoria
- Original team: Fairfield
- Height: 175 cm (5 ft 9 in)
- Weight: 70 kg (154 lb)

Playing career^{1}
Years	Club	Games (Goals)
1918–1923	Fitzroy	75 (3)
- ^{1} Playing statistics correct to the end of 1923.

Clarence Alfred Woodward Sherry (4 June 1895 – 19 April 1977) was an Australian rules footballer who played with Fitzroy in the Victorian Football League (VFL).

Sherry was one of Fitzroy's wingmen in their 1922 premiership team and also played in the side which lost the 1923 VFL Grand Final. As he retired after the 1923 premiership decider, and missed most of that year, Sherry had appeared in two grand finals from his last five games.

He was good enough to represent the VFL in interstate football on three occasions during his career.
