= Leo Wescott =

Australian rules footballer, born 1900

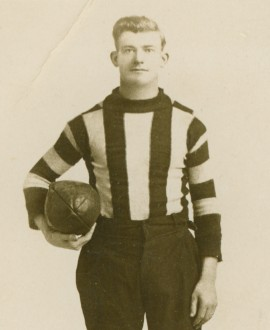
- Wescott in 1923

Personal information
- Full name: Henry David Wescott
- Born: 8 July 1900; Clifton Hill, Victoria
- Died: 25 February 1970 (aged 69); Fitzroy, Victoria
- Original team: Collingwood District
- Height: 170 cm (5 ft 7 in)
- Weight: 70 kg (154 lb)

Playing career^{1}
Years	Club	Games (Goals)
1922–27, 1929, 1931-32	Collingwood	143 (3)
- ^{1} Playing statistics correct to the end of 1932.

Henry David 'Leo' Wescott (8 July 1900 – 25 February 1970) was an Australian rules footballer who played with Collingwood in the Victorian Football League (VFL).

Wescott was a back pocket specialist and started his career at Collingwood in 1922. He played in the Collingwood premiership sides of 1927 and 1929.

Wescott was captain-coach of Dimboola's 1928 Wimmera Football League's premiership team.

In 1930 he moved to Tasmania where he played for Longford in the Northern Tasmanian Football Association, winning the Tasman Shields Trophy for the competition's Best and Fairest player. He returned to Collingwood in 1931 before playing his last game for the Magpies at the end of the 1932 season.

After a season at Kyneton, Wescott spent five years as captain-coach Prahran and steered them to the 1937 premiership. He finished his coaching career with a stint at Sandringham.
