= Eric Donaldson (footballer, born 1898) =

Australian rules footballer

Personal information
- Full name: Eric Donaldson
- Born: 9 January 1898; Caulfield, Victoria
- Died: 4 April 1964 (aged 66); Sandringham, Victoria
- Original team: Elsternwick
- Height: 184 cm (6 ft 0 in)
- Weight: 78 kg (172 lb)

Playing career^{1}
Years	Club	Games (Goals)
1923	St Kilda	1 (0)
- ^{1} Playing statistics correct to the end of 1923.

Eric Donaldson (9 January 1898 – 4 April 1964) was an Australian rules footballer who played with St Kilda in the Victorian Football League (VFL).

His brother Clyde Donaldson played for Essendon.
