= Mosquito Fleet (Johnstone River, Queensland) =

Fleet of small vessels used to negotiate the sandbar at Geraldton, Australia

'Sugar Lighters in the Johnstone River, Queensland' In the early days of settlement at Geraldton [now Innisfail], the Johnstone River had a sand bar at the mouth and several shallow stretches in the river. This caused difficulties for shipping. Large ships had to either anchor at the mouth of the river and wait for a suitable high tide so that the bar could be crossed or anchor in Mourilyan Harbour to the south. The problem of large ships being unable to enter the river made it difficult for bags of sugar from the district sugar mills to be transported to southern refineries. To overcome this problem, shallow draft steam ships and lighters [often called sugar lighters] were used to carry the bags of sugar down the Johnstone and out to meet larger ships standing off the coast. or in nearby ports, mainly Cairns. These larger ships then transported the cargo to its destination. These small ships became known as "The Mosquito Fleet".

== Ships of the Mosquito Fleet ==
Many different ships were part of the Mosquito Fleet at different times.

1. The Palmer, a steel, twin screw steamer,140 feet in length, which arrived in 1884.
2. The Muriel which arrived in 1894 and was part of the fleet until 1926 when she was sold to Hayles of Townsville
3. The Wakefield from 1896 until 1910
4. The SS Herbert from 1896 until 1932
5. The Carroo from 1900 until she caught fire after an explosion off Hinchinbrook Island
6. The Goondi, which was a former tug originally named the Gartmore, until it was sold in 1955 to Wilson Hart and Co, sawmillers of Maryborough
7. The Katoora which was built in 1927 and was sold in 1960 to Keith Holland Shipping of Cairns
8. The SS Toorie from 1928 until 1940
9. The Innisfail and the Cora were general cargo vessels as well as carrying raw sugar.
10. The Korara from 1954 until 1960.

== Navigating the Johnstone River ==
Whenever Captain Heath, of the Queensland government Rivers and Harbours Department, called at Innisfail in the government vessel Pippo, he often had to wait for the high tide before he could cross the bar and enter the Johnstone River. On Captain Heath's order, a pilot station was built at Flying Fish Point in 1884 so that a pilot would be available to assist in crossing the bar. Navigation lights were placed in the Johnstone River in 1885. In October 1885, special leases for wharf sites on the town reach of the North Johnstone River were auctioned.

== The Adelaide Steamship Company ==
Many of these ships were under charter from their owners and operated by the Queensland Steam Shipping Company or the Adelaide Steamship Company.The Adelaide Steamship Company began working in North Queensland on 1 June 1893 under contract to the Colonial Sugar Refining Company. The Adelaide Steamship Company had a wharf on the town reach of the Johnstone River. Although their main cargo was sugar, the Mosquito Fleet also transported other produce of the district, such as bananas, taro and tapioca. Ships of the Mosquito Fleet also carried mail to the Johnstone River Post Office, which began operation on 1 November 1882. Mail day was an important event and everyone tried to be on hand to meet the boat and collect their mail. Any return mail had to be ready to leave when the boat left on the next tide.

== The Polly ==
One of the many sugar lighters to carry the mail was the Qld Steam Shipping Company vessel, the Polly. The Polly was a 194 gross tons. Lbd: 120' x 20'7" x 8'5" iron steamship built by Campbelltown Shipbuilding Co, Glasgow. After picking up cargo at Goondi Mill, the Polly broke her moorings during a flood, and was carried down the river. She ran aground, with her bow well up on the river bank, upstream from the Geraldton wharves. As the flood water dropped in the North Johnstone River, she broke her back on 17 November 1899. Mr H. Cotter salvaged a gun from the wreck and mounted it behind the Exchange Hotel where it was fired annually to herald the New Year. A creek near the wreck site was named Polly Creek. Rowing up the river to picnic near the wreck of the Polly became a popular Sunday afternoon outing. The Polly is still visible in long grass on the bank of the North Johnstone River near Polly Creek at low tide.

== The Tully ==
The Tully was owned by Captain James Broadfoot and was under charter to the Adelaide Steamship Company. The Tully ran aground on rocks in the stretch of river known as the Coconuts on 1 September 1927 when outward bound with sugar from Goondi Mill. These rocks are now known as the Tully Rocks. After attempts to save her, the Tully was abandoned. She could be seen on the rocks for many years, until the remains disappeared during a cyclone.

== The Seymour ==
Captain James Broadfoot also owned the steamer Seymour, which transported sugar to Cairns and Townsville. On 30 March 1921 during heavy weather the steamer, inbound from Townsville, successfully crossed the bar at the mouth of the Johnstone River but ran aground on a shoal near the Coconuts. Some of her cargo was taken off and transported to Innisfail by another lighter so that she could be refloated.

== Sugar Lighters involved in industrial unrest ==
In 1928 there was industrial unrest on the waterfront in Innisfail. The loading and shipping of sugar stopped. A group of sugar farmers loaded their own sugar, under police protection, and the Goondi sailed to Cairns manned by farmers along with the ship's engineers and navigators. About the same time, a party of farmers travelled to Cairns by train and sailed the Carroo to the Johnstone River to be loaded with sugar.

== The SS Toorie ==
On 9 July 1933 the steamer SS Toorie, loaded with 240 tons of raw sugar, was carried off course by a strong current in the Johnstone River, onto an area of rocks. The incident was reported to the Innisfail Manager of the Adelaide Steamship Company, Mr McGavin, by Mr S R Robinson of the Flying Fish Point Pilot Station staff. McGavin engaged the motor launch, Mandalay, to transfer some of the sugar from the Toorie to the Goondi which was standing by to receive it at the Coconuts. The tug, Uta, which had been summoned from Cairns, was piloted across the Johnstone River bar by Pilot Oaks and travelled upriver to the Toorie. The Uta used a six-inch rope to slowly tow the Toorie off the rocks. Once the Toorie was in deep water, the Uta cast off and left on the return journey to Cairns. The SS Toorie had taken no water and sustained no apparent damage. She was sailed up the Johnstone River and was anchored midstream near the Adelaide Steamship wharf to await inspection by an engineer surveyor from Townsville.

== Sugar Lighters in World War 2 ==
Several Sugar Lighters were seconded for use during WW2. The Katoora, the Wortanna, and the Carroo were manned by U.S. sailors. The SS Toorie, the SS Terka, and the SS Tolga were seconded to the Australian Navy and used as mine sweepers.

== The Last shipment by Sugar Lighter ==
The final cargo of sugar was loaded into the Korara at Goondi Mill on 9 April 1960. Bulk sugar carriers took over from the Sugar Lighters.
