= Jim Watson (Australian footballer) =

Australian rules footballer

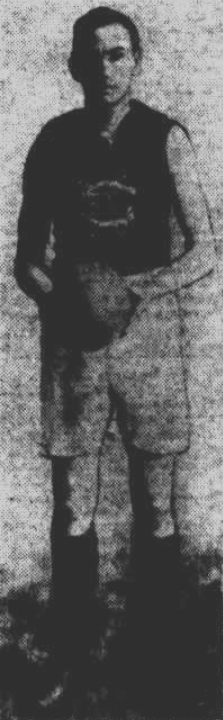

Personal information
- Full name: James Hamish Watson
- Born: 11 March 1896; Windsor, Victoria
- Died: 28 December 1978 (aged 82); Mentone, Victoria
- Original team: Carlton District
- Height: 179 cm (5 ft 10 in)
- Weight: 71 kg (157 lb)
- Position: Fullback

Playing career^{1}
Years	Club	Games (Goals)
1921, 1923–29	Carlton	91 (0)
1929	Fitzroy	6 (0)
Total		97 (0)
- ^{1} Playing statistics correct to the end of 1929.

James Hamish Watson (11 March 1896 – 28 December 1978) was an Australian rules footballer who played with Carlton and Fitzroy in the Victorian Football League (VFL).
