= Jack Morrissey (footballer) =

Australian rules footballer

Personal information
- Full name: John Joseph Morrissey
- Born: 14 July 1898; Timor, Victoria
- Died: 27 August 1968 (aged 70); Maryborough, Victoria
- Original team: Dunolly
- Height: 170 cm (5 ft 7 in)
- Weight: 73 kg (161 lb)

Playing career^{1}
Years	Club	Games (Goals)
1920, 1922–27	Carlton	56 (0)
1928–30	North Melbourne	29 (0)
Total		85 (0)
- ^{1} Playing statistics correct to the end of 1930.

Jack Morrissey (14 July 1898 – 27 August 1968) was an Australian rules footballer who played with Carlton and North Melbourne in the Victorian Football League (VFL).
