= Ralph Gardiner (footballer) =

Australian rules footballer

Personal information
- Full name: Balfour Gardiner
- Born: 19 February 1897; Cudgen, New South Wales
- Died: 3 May 1945 (aged 48); Sydney, New South Wales
- Original team: North Melbourne (VFA)
- Height: 173 cm (5 ft 8 in)
- Weight: 72 kg (159 lb)

Playing career^{1}
Years	Club	Games (Goals)
1920–21	Essendon	8 (3)
- ^{1} Playing statistics correct to the end of 1921.

Balfour Gardiner (19 February 1897 – 3 May 1945) was an Australian rules footballer who played with Essendon in the Victorian Football League (VFL).

He died in Sydney Hospital in May 1945 after being knocked over by a motorcyclist when alighting from a tram.
