= Gordon McCracken =

Personal information
- Full name: William Clifford Gordon McCracken
- Born: 22 March 1898; Fitzroy North, Victoria
- Died: 27 January 1964 (aged 65); Fitzroy, Victoria
- Original team: Essendon Association
- Height: 191 cm (6 ft 3 in)
- Weight: 86 kg (190 lb)
- Position: Ruckman

Playing career^{1}
Years	Club	Games (Goals)
1919	Essendon A (VFA)	8 (11)
1920–27	Fitzroy	109 (61)
- ^{1} Playing statistics correct to the end of 1927.

William Clifford Gordon McCracken, OBE (22 March 1898 – 27 January 1964) was an Australian Commonwealth Note and Stamp Printer and an Australian rules footballer who played with Fitzroy in the Victorian Football League (VFL) during the 1920s.

== Football ==
McCracken, who contested nine finals from 1922 to 1924, was Fitzroy's ruckman in the 1922 premiership side. He was again a follower in the 1923 Grand Final but was off the ground injured for much of the encounter and Fitzroy lost by 17 points. In the same year, McCracken represented the VFL at interstate football. Before arriving at Fitzroy, he played for Essendon Association in the Victorian Football Association.

== Note and Stamp Printing ==
McCracken joined the Commonwealth Bank on 1 August 1936, as Works Manager, and was appointed as the Australian Note and Stamp Printer on 21 April 1940. During this period he was responsible for introducing new equipment, the photogravure printing process, and (reportedly) the elimination of personal monograms and imprints in favour of 'By Authority' impersonal marks in 1942. He retired in March 1963, the same year he was appointed as an Officer of the Order of the British Empire.
