= Stan Molan =

Australian rules footballer

Personal information
- Full name: Stanley Michael Molan
- Born: 26 September 1893
- Died: 27 June 1943 (aged 49)
- Original team: Public Service
- Height: 183 cm (6 ft 0 in)
- Weight: 83 kg (183 lb)

Playing career^{1}
Years	Club	Games (Goals)
1918–1924	Fitzroy	111 (59)
- ^{1} Playing statistics correct to the end of 1924.

Stanley Michael "Stan" Molan (26 September 1893 – 27 June 1943) was an Australian rules footballer who played with Fitzroy in the Victorian Football League (VFL).

Molan was already 24 when he started his career at Fitzroy. He was handy in front of goals in his first two seasons, with his 24 goals in 1918 bettered by only one teammate, Jimmy Freake. He kicked another 22 goals in 1919 but from then spent most of his time as a defender.

Playing in a successful era meant that Molan was able to make 10 appearances in finals football. He was Fitzroy's centre half-back in their 1922 premiership team and played in the same position when they lost the grand final a year later.

He was a four time VFL representative.
