= Chris Gomez (footballer) =

Australian rules footballer

Personal information
- Full name: Cecil Christoa Gomez
- Born: 7 May 1899
- Died: 13 March 1947 (aged 47)
- Height: 179 cm (5 ft 10 in)
- Weight: 80 kg (176 lb)

Playing career^{1}
Years	Club	Games (Goals)
1925	North Melbourne	10 (0)
1926–28	Essendon	9 (0)
Total		19 (0)
- ^{1} Playing statistics correct to the end of 1928.

Cecil Christoa "Chris" Gomez (7 May 1899 – 13 March 1947) was an Australian rules footballer who played with North Melbourne and Essendon in the Victorian Football League (VFL).

He first played senior football on the west coast of Tasmania with the Gormanston Football Club, which played in the Lyell Miners Football Association, based in Queenstown. The large mines in the region supplied sufficient players for 9 teams.
