= Clyde Donaldson =

Australian rules footballer

Personal information
- Born: 9 June 1894; Elsternwick, Victoria
- Died: 23 May 1979 (aged 84); St Kilda East, Victoria
- Original team: Brunswick Juniors
- Height: 185 cm (6 ft 1 in)
- Weight: 76 kg (168 lb)

Playing career^{1}
Years	Club	Games (Goals)
1913–14, 1919–26	Essendon	144 (28)
- ^{1} Playing statistics correct to the end of 1926.

Career highlights
- AIF Pioneer Exhibition Game, London, 28 October 1916

Clyde Donaldson (9 June 1894 – 23 May 1979) was an Australian rules footballer who played for Essendon in the Victorian Football League (VFL).

== Family ==
The son of George Donaldson (1857-), and Louisa Emma Susanna Donaldson (1858–1932), née Seyler, Clyde Donaldson was born in Elsternwick, Victoria on 9 June 1894. His brother, Eric Donaldson played for St Kilda.

He married Edith Evelyn Happell (1895–1968) on 16 April 1921. He married Daisy Evans (1905–1981) on 24 September 1969.

== Football ==
=== Essendon (VFL) ===
After two seasons playing with Essendon, Donaldson's career was interrupted by World War I when he spent fours years overseas with the Australian Expeditionary Force.

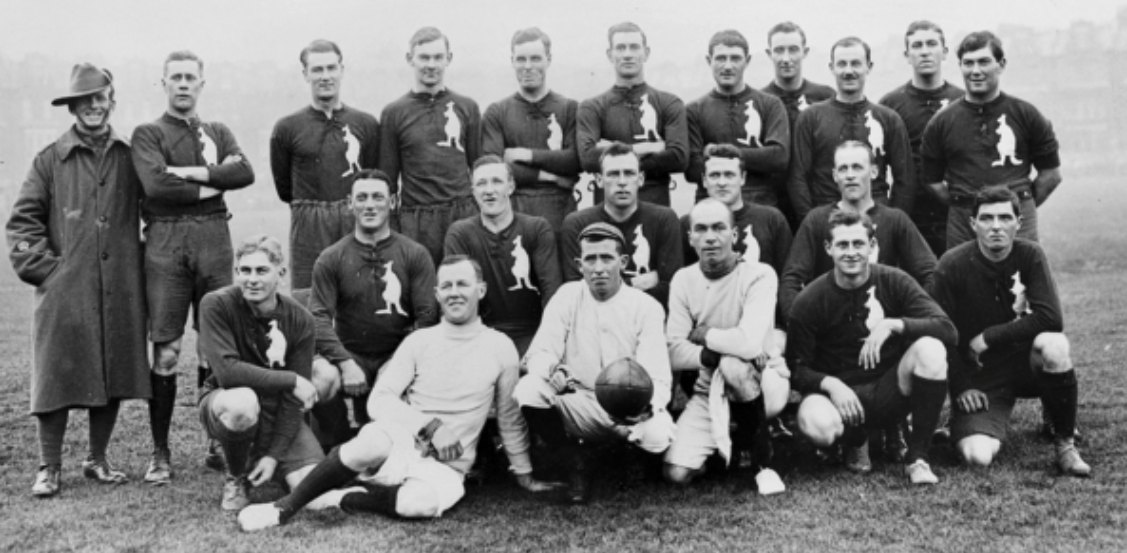
The Australian Training Units Team: 28 October 1916. Clyde Donaldson is the fourth man (third player) from the left, in the back row.

=== Training Units team (AIF) ===
While in London he took part in the famous "Pioneer Exhibition Game" of Australian Rules football, held in London, in October 1916, representing the Australian Training Units team. A news film was taken at the match.

=== Essendon (VFL) ===
In 1919 he returned to Essendon and became a regular Victorian interstate representative throughout the 1920s. A back pocket specialist, Donaldson was tough to beat in an aerial contest and was a long kick of the ball. He was a member of Essendon's 1923 and 1924 premiership teams.

== Journalist ==
After retiring in 1926, Donaldson became a noted football journalist for the Truth newspaper.

== Death ==
He died in East St Kilda on 23 May 1979.

== See also ==
- 1916 Pioneer Exhibition Game
