= Steve Donnellan =

Australian rules footballer

Personal information
- Full name: Steve Donnellan
- Born: 12 November 1900
- Died: 29 June 1934 (aged 33)
- Original team: Cohuna
- Height: 178 cm (5 ft 10 in)
- Weight: 76 kg (168 lb)

Playing career^{1}
Years	Club	Games (Goals)
1922–1925	Fitzroy	27 (12)
- ^{1} Playing statistics correct to the end of 1925.

Steve Donnellan (12 November 1900 – 29 June 1934) was an Australian rules footballer who played with Fitzroy in the Victorian Football League (VFL).

== Football ==
Donnellan came to Fitzroy from Cohuna and played 16 games in his debut season in 1922.

He was the centre half-forward in Fitzroy's premiership team that year but made just 11 more appearances over the next three seasons.

He played with Echuca in the Bendigo Football League after leaving Fitzroy.
