= Jimmy Sullivan (footballer) =

Australian rules footballer (1896–1983)

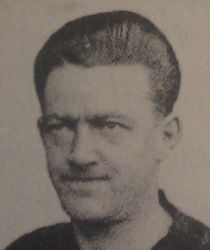

Personal information
- Full name: James Andrew Sullivan
- Born: 8 April 1896; Maryborough
- Died: 1 May 1983 (aged 87); Brunswick West, Victoria
- Original teams: Williamstown juniors, Maryborough
- Height: 168 cm (5 ft 6 in)
- Weight: 58 kg (128 lb)
- Positions: Winger, half-forward flank

Playing career^{1}
Years	Club	Games (Goals)
1918–1925	Essendon	90 (20)
1925	Melbourne	6 (0)
Total		96 (20)

Representative team honours^{2}
Years	Team	Games (Goals)
1920, 1923	Victoria	2
- ^{1} Playing statistics correct to the end of 1925.^{2} Representative statistics correct as of 1923.

James Andrew Sullivan (8 April 1896 – 1 May 1983) was an Australian rules footballer who played for Essendon and Melbourne in the Victorian Football League (VFL).

Sullivan was one of the small players in the Essendon team of the 1920s which earned them the nickname "mosquito fleet". A wingman of considerable pace, he vice captained Essendon in 1923 but was not selected in premiership side that year. He did however become a premiership player the following season in the league's new round robin finals format before finishing his career with a stint at Melbourne.
