= Charlie Hardy =

Australian rules footballer & coach (1887–1968)

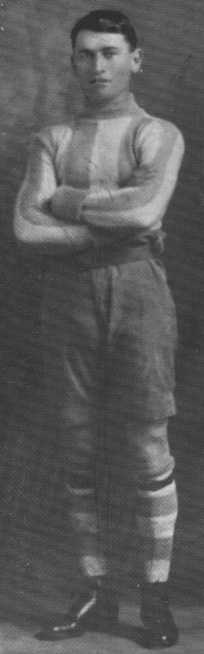

Personal information
- Full name: Charles Hardy
- Born: 1 April 1887; Yea, Victoria
- Died: 19 May 1968 (aged 81); Fitzroy, Victoria
- Original team: Gippsland
- Debut: Round 10, 1921, Essendon vs. Melbourne, at the MCG
- Height: 157 cm (5 ft 2 in)
- Weight: 54 kg (119 lb)

Playing career^{1}
Years	Club	Games (Goals)
1908–1921	North Melbourne (VFA)	224
1921–1925	Essendon (VFL)	36 (21)

Coaching career
Years	Club	Games (W–L–D)
1928–1930	Essendon	54 (30–23–1)
1931–1932	St Kilda	25 (9–16–0)
Total		79 (39–39–1)
- ^{1} Playing statistics correct to the end of 1925.

Charles Hardy (1 April 1887 – 19 May 1968) was an Australian rules footballer who played for North Melbourne in the Victorian Football Association (VFA) during the 1910s and Essendon in the Victorian Football League (VFL) during the early 1920s.

== VFA ==
Hardy played with North Melbourne in the VFA for over a decade where he formed a strong ruck combination with Syd Barker. At just 157 cm and 54 kg Hardy is one of the smallest players to ever play at a top level.

He captained the club in 1914, and served as a brilliant rover helping North to premiership victories in 1910, 1914, 1915 and 1918. He was also a member of the famous "invincibles" side that went undefeated in a record 58 games. Hardy left the club along with many of his teammates upon the temporary disbanding of North Melbourne in 1921, and joined Essendon in the VFL.

== Essendon ==
Hardy made his senior VFL debut in Round 10 of the 1921 season; he was aged 34 and became the oldest player in the history of the league to make his debut. In 1921, he also represented Victoria at the Perth Carnival. Hardy continued to be a leading player for Essendon, playing in both the 1923 and the 1924 premiership teams. Hardy retired at the end of the 1925 VFL season, aged 38, becoming the oldest player to play a League match for Essendon; this record was overtaken by Dustin Fletcher, who played his final game in 2015 at 40 years and 21 days.

== Coaching ==
Hardy started his coaching career at VFA club Coburg and coached them to premierships in 1926 and 1927, the club's first two. This effort saw him rejoin Essendon in 1928 as their non-playing coach and he spent three years in this role with the Bombers, narrowly missing the finals on each occasion. In 1931 he crossed to St Kilda and was coach for two seasons, with little success. During the First World War recess in the VFA, he went to Williamstown Juniors in the VJFA as captain-coach during 1916 when the incumbent coach, former Williamstown player Reg Wallis, was badly injured early in the season and ruled out for the remainder of the year. Williamstown Juniors won the premiership in that season and followed it up with another in 1917 before Hardy returned to North Melbourne.
