= Jack Garden =

Australian rules footballer

Personal information
- Full name: John Neagle Garden
- Born: 3 March 1895; Kerang, Victoria
- Died: 1 December 1955 (aged 60); Deepdene, Victoria
- Original team: Melbourne District
- Height: 170 cm (5 ft 7 in)
- Weight: 70 kg (154 lb)

Playing career^{1}
Years	Club	Games (Goals)
1915, 1920–26	Essendon	116 (42)
- ^{1} Playing statistics correct to the end of 1926.

Jack Garden (3 March 1895 – 1 December 1955) was an Australian rules footballer who played with Essendon in the VFL.

A wingman, Garden debuted for Essendon in 1915 but did not play again until 1920 due to war service. He won the Essendon Best and Fairest award in his first year back and the following season made his first appearance for Victoria. Garden won back-to-back premierships in 1923 and 1924.
