= Syd Barker Sr. =

Australian rules footballer (1887–1930)

Syd Barker
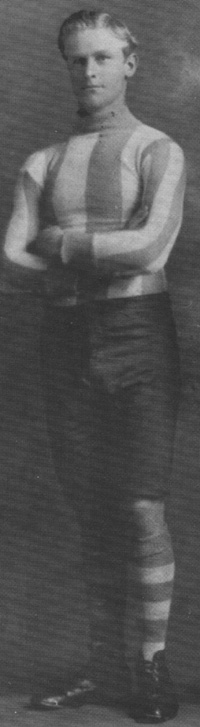

Personal information
- Full name: Sydney Quinton Barker Sr.
- Born: 26 November 1887; Collingwood, Victoria
- Died: 23 March 1930 (aged 42); Abbotsford, Victoria
- Height: 183 cm (6 ft 0 in)
- Weight: 95 kg (209 lb)
- Position: Ruckman

Playing career^{1}
Years	Club	Games (Goals)
1907	Essendon Association (VFA)	7 (4)
1908	Richmond (VFL)	2 (1)
1908	Williamstown Football Club	2 (0)
1909–1921	North Melbourne (VFA)	161 (61)
1921–1924	Essendon (VFL)	57 (23)
1927	North Melbourne (VFL)	9 (1)
Total		238 (90)

Coaching career
Years	Club	Games (W–L–D)
1922–1924	Essendon (VFL)	43 (31–11–1)
1927	North Melbourne (VFL)	18 (3–15–0)
Total		61 (34–26–1)
- ^{1} Playing statistics correct to the end of 1927.

Career highlights
- North Melbourne premiership player: 1910, 1914, 1915, 1918; Essendon premiership player-coach: 1923, 1924

Sydney Quinton Barker Sr. (26 November 1887 – 23 March 1930) was an Australian rules footballer who played with Richmond, Essendon and North Melbourne in the Victorian Football League (VFL). His son, also named Syd Barker, had a brief league career with North Melbourne.

Barker's long footballing career began at Essendon 'A' in the Victorian Football Association (VFA) with whom he played before joining Richmond in 1908 for their inaugural VFL season. He managed just a couple of games and decided to return to the VFA, this time with North Melbourne.

A ruckman, Barker was a player in North's "invincibles" side that won premierships in 1910, 1914, 1915 and 1918. He captained the club in their last two premierships and through a record 58-game unbeaten streak from 1914 to 1919.

In 1921, North disbanded as part of a plan to merge with Essendon and join the VFL in 1922. Barker moved to Essendon's VFL side in mid-1921 in good faith that the merger would go ahead, but it ended up being blocked by the State Government, and Barker was unable to return to the VFA, having been suspended for crossing without a clearance. He became captain-coach at Essendon in 1922 and led the club to back to back premierships in 1923 and 1924 before announcing his retirement.

Barker came out of retirement in 1927 and returned to his old club North Melbourne, who were in their third VFL season. As captain-coach he could only manage three wins and the club finished the season second last.

Barker was a fireman by profession and less than three years after his last VFL match he died suddenly while at work at the Abbotsford Fire Station.

North Melbourne best and fairest winners are awarded the Syd Barker Medal.
