= Greg Stockdale =

Australian rules footballer and coach

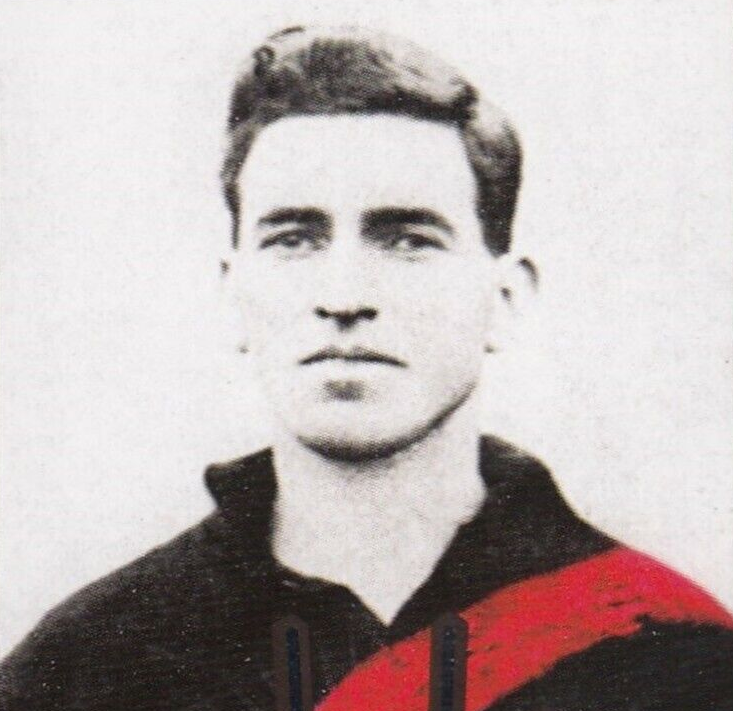

Personal information
- Full name: Francis Gregory Stockdale
- Born: 30 July 1899; Kilmore, Victoria
- Died: 14 May 1949 (aged 49); Kew, Victoria
- Original teams: Kilmore, Rushworth, Corowa
- Height: 178 cm (5 ft 10 in)
- Weight: 73 kg (161 lb)
- Position: Forward

Playing career^{1}
Years	Club	Games (Goals)
1920–1928	Essendon	106 (189)
1929–1931	Northcote	55 (20)
1932-1933	Coburg	45 (44)
Total		205 (253)
- ^{1} Playing statistics correct to the end of 1928.

Career highlights
- VFL leading goalkicker: 1923; 3× Essendon leading goalkicker: 1921, 1924, 1926

Francis Gregory Stockdale (30 July 1899 – 14 May 1949) was an Australian rules footballer who played with Essendon in the Victorian Football League (VFL) during the 1920s. A noted goalkicker, in the 1923 VFL season Stockdale broke the league record for the most goals kicked by a player in a season (when including finals matches), finishing with 68 goals from his 18 appearances.

== Early life ==
The son of William Hallett Stockdale (1859–1927), and Agnes Stockdale (?–1925), née Heavy (or Heavey or Harvey), Francis Gregory Stockdale was born at Kilmore, Victoria, on 30 July 1899.

== Football career ==
=== Local football beginnings ===
Stockdale played with the Kilmore Football Club in 1917 and 1918 before transferring to Rushworth Football Club in the Kyabram and District Football League in 1919. He then moved to Corowa to work (at Stockdale & Skehan Motor Garage) and played football with one of his older brothers, Chas Stockdale, in the powerful Ovens and Murray Football League from 1920 to 1922. It was at Corowa Football Club that Stockdale's football started to excel. He was a member of Corowa's 1921 O&MFA grand final side that lost to Lake Rovers. Stockdale managed to play seven games with Essendon between 1920 and 1922, before moving down to Melbourne permanently after the 1922 O&MFA season to play with Essendon.

=== Individual accolades at Essendon ===
A left footer, Stockdale started his career at Essendon as a half back flanker in 1920. After playing a full season for Corowa in 1922, Stockdale played his first match for the season with Essendon in round 15, then played as a forward in the 1922 preliminary final against Fitzroy. Playing at full-forward, he kicked five of Essendon's six goals — one of them, in the third quarter with his opposite foot — in a losing match. He remained a forward for most of his career.

In the opening match of the 1923 season, against St Kilda, Stockdale kicked 10 goals. By the end of the 1923 season, he had kicked 68 goals and was the VFL league's leading goalkicker, breaking the record for the most goals kicked by a player in a season after finals. Stockdale was Essendon's leading goalkicker in 1923 (68 goals), 1926 (36 goals), and 1928 (39 goals).

He won Essendon's best and fairest award in 1925; was the team's vice-captain in 1928, and served as captain for one match in 1928. Stockdale also represented Victoria in interstate football on 8 occasions (1923, 1925, 1927, and 1928). In 1928, during what would be his final season at Essendon, Stockdale was reported for striking South Melbourne's Bill Berryman in the third quarter of his side's Round 3 match at Windy Hill. Having heard evidence that Stockdale had struck Berryman four times in the back, the VFL Tribunal suspended Stockdale for eight matches.

=== Team success in the VFA ===
For the 1929 season, Stockdale joined Northcote in the Victorian Football Association (VFA), where he would eventually play for three seasons (1929 to 1931). Stockdale was part of Northcote's first premiership side in 1929. Although Stockdale was not released to Brunswick in 1931, he was cleared from Northcote in February 1932. Stockdale then served as captain-coach of Coburg for two seasons (1932 to 1933).

== Personal life ==
One of Stockdale's older brothers, William Hallett Stockdale (1887–1915), was killed in action at Gallipoli on 8 May 1915.

Stockdale married Ivy Gladys Lobb (1894–1947) in 1936.

== Death ==
Stockdale died at a private hospital in Kew, Victoria, on 14 May 1949.

== See also ==
- 1927 Melbourne Carnival
