= 1922 VFL season =

26th season of the Victorian Football League (VFL)

1922 VFL premiership season
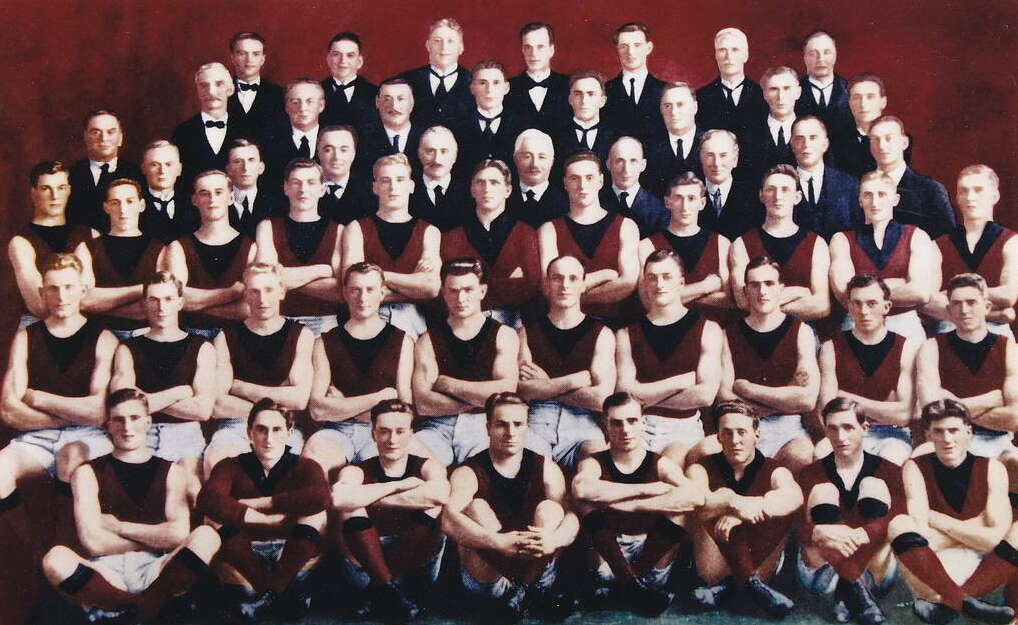
- Fitzroy 1922 VFL premiership team

Overview
- Date: 6 May – 14 October 1921
- Teams: 9
- Premiers: Fitzroy; 7th premiership
- Runners-up: Collingwood; 7th runners-up result
- Minor premiers: Collingwood; 7th minor premiership
- Leading goalkicker medallist: Horrie Clover (Carlton); 54 goals

Attendance
- Matches played: 76
- Total attendance: 1,532,070 (20,159 per match)
- Highest (H&A): 40,000 (round 5, Richmond v Essendon)
- Highest (finals): 64,148 (semi-final, Essendon v Carlton)

The 1922 VFL season was the 26th season of the Victorian Football League (VFL), the highest-level senior Australian rules football competition in Victoria. The season featured nine clubs and ran from 6 May to 14 October, comprising a 16-match home-and-away season followed by a four-week finals series featuring the top four clubs.

Fitzroy won the premiership, defeating Collingwood by eleven points in the 1922 VFL grand final; it was Fitzroy's seventh VFL premiership. Collingwood won the minor premiership by finishing atop the home-and-away ladder with a 12–4 win–loss record. Carlton's Horrie Clover won the leading goalkicker medal as the league's leading goalkicker.

== Background ==
In 1922, the VFL competition consisted of nine teams of 18 on-the-field players each, with no "reserves", although any of the 18 players who had left the playing field for any reason could later resume their place on the field at any time during the match.

Each team played each other twice in a home-and-away season of 18 rounds (i.e., 16 matches and 2 byes).

Once the 18 round home-and-away season had finished, the 1922 VFL Premiers were determined by the specific format and conventions of the amended "Argus system".

== Home-and-away season ==
=== Round 1 ===
Home team	Home team score	Away team	Away team score	Venue	Crowd	Date
South Melbourne	7.13 (55)	Melbourne	8.12 (60)	Lake Oval	15,000	6 May 1922
St Kilda	8.8 (56)	Fitzroy	10.9 (69)	Junction Oval	12,000	6 May 1922
Richmond	10.13 (73)	Collingwood	8.8 (56)	Punt Road Oval	27,000	6 May 1922
Essendon	11.14 (80)	Carlton	9.8 (62)	Windy Hill	22,000	6 May 1922

=== Round 2 ===
Home team	Home team score	Away team	Away team score	Venue	Crowd	Date
Melbourne	13.10 (88)	Richmond	12.13 (85)	MCG	23,902	13 May 1922
Collingwood	9.12 (66)	South Melbourne	10.12 (72)	Victoria Park	20,000	13 May 1922
Carlton	10.13 (73)	Fitzroy	9.9 (63)	Princes Park	25,000	13 May 1922
Geelong	6.6 (42)	Essendon	8.16 (64)	Corio Oval	12,000	13 May 1922

=== Round 3 ===
Home team	Home team score	Away team	Away team score	Venue	Crowd	Date
Fitzroy	14.13 (97)	Geelong	10.12 (72)	Brunswick Street Oval	12,000	20 May 1922
Essendon	12.12 (84)	South Melbourne	8.13 (61)	Windy Hill	20,000	20 May 1922
St Kilda	12.12 (84)	Melbourne	11.8 (74)	Junction Oval	10,000	20 May 1922
Collingwood	10.18 (78)	Carlton	10.11 (71)	Victoria Park	25,000	20 May 1922

=== Round 4 ===
Home team	Home team score	Away team	Away team score	Venue	Crowd	Date
Geelong	11.9 (75)	Richmond	11.7 (73)	Corio Oval	12,000	27 May 1922
Carlton	14.12 (96)	Melbourne	8.16 (64)	Princes Park	15,000	27 May 1922
South Melbourne	8.13 (61)	St Kilda	12.5 (77)	Lake Oval	20,000	27 May 1922
Fitzroy	6.15 (51)	Essendon	7.9 (51)	Brunswick Street Oval	26,000	27 May 1922

=== Round 5 ===
Home team	Home team score	Away team	Away team score	Venue	Crowd	Date
Collingwood	15.14 (104)	St Kilda	4.11 (35)	Victoria Park	30,000	3 June 1922
South Melbourne	8.15 (63)	Carlton	4.11 (35)	Lake Oval	25,000	3 June 1922
Melbourne	9.12 (66)	Geelong	9.6 (60)	MCG	16,189	5 June 1922
Richmond	7.12 (54)	Essendon	9.10 (64)	Punt Road Oval	40,000	5 June 1922

=== Round 6 ===
Home team	Home team score	Away team	Away team score	Venue	Crowd	Date
Fitzroy	9.18 (72)	Richmond	7.9 (51)	Brunswick Street Oval	30,000	10 June 1922
Essendon	12.21 (93)	Melbourne	5.12 (42)	Windy Hill	15,000	10 June 1922
Carlton	13.19 (97)	St Kilda	12.14 (86)	Princes Park	15,000	10 June 1922
Geelong	8.9 (57)	Collingwood	19.6 (120)	Corio Oval	12,000	10 June 1922

=== Round 7 ===
Home team	Home team score	Away team	Away team score	Venue	Crowd	Date
Collingwood	15.10 (100)	Fitzroy	10.8 (68)	Victoria Park	30,000	17 June 1922
Carlton	8.15 (63)	Geelong	9.19 (73)	Princes Park	12,000	17 June 1922
South Melbourne	10.14 (74)	Richmond	12.7 (79)	Lake Oval	20,000	17 June 1922
St Kilda	13.11 (89)	Essendon	15.7 (97)	Junction Oval	20,000	17 June 1922

=== Round 8 ===
Home team	Home team score	Away team	Away team score	Venue	Crowd	Date
Geelong	7.12 (54)	St Kilda	10.5 (65)	Corio Oval	12,000	24 June 1922
Fitzroy	9.13 (67)	South Melbourne	8.8 (56)	Brunswick Street Oval	20,000	24 June 1922
Melbourne	9.13 (67)	Collingwood	7.17 (59)	MCG	17,496	24 June 1922
Richmond	10.6 (66)	Carlton	12.11 (83)	Punt Road Oval	30,000	24 June 1922

=== Round 9 ===
Home team	Home team score	Away team	Away team score	Venue	Crowd	Date
Richmond	11.13 (79)	St Kilda	7.12 (54)	Punt Road Oval	25,000	1 July 1922
Geelong	16.18 (114)	South Melbourne	4.6 (30)	Corio Oval	8,000	1 July 1922
Fitzroy	5.19 (49)	Melbourne	4.9 (33)	Brunswick Street Oval	12,000	1 July 1922
Essendon	7.14 (56)	Collingwood	10.5 (65)	Windy Hill	30,000	1 July 1922

=== Round 10 ===
Home team	Home team score	Away team	Away team score	Venue	Crowd	Date
Melbourne	15.10 (100)	South Melbourne	9.18 (72)	MCG	9,850	15 July 1922
Fitzroy	13.11 (89)	St Kilda	8.14 (62)	Brunswick Street Oval	17,000	15 July 1922
Collingwood	6.14 (50)	Richmond	3.13 (31)	Victoria Park	25,000	15 July 1922
Carlton	11.19 (85)	Essendon	7.10 (52)	Princes Park	30,000	15 July 1922

=== Round 11 ===
Home team	Home team score	Away team	Away team score	Venue	Crowd	Date
Essendon	12.10 (82)	Geelong	13.16 (94)	Windy Hill	15,000	22 July 1922
Richmond	11.14 (80)	Melbourne	10.17 (77)	Punt Road Oval	18,000	22 July 1922
South Melbourne	7.14 (56)	Collingwood	8.16 (64)	Lake Oval	20,000	22 July 1922
Fitzroy	11.13 (79)	Carlton	9.7 (61)	Brunswick Street Oval	30,000	22 July 1922

=== Round 12 ===
Home team	Home team score	Away team	Away team score	Venue	Crowd	Date
Melbourne	13.10 (88)	St Kilda	11.10 (76)	MCG	14,929	29 July 1922
Carlton	12.16 (88)	Collingwood	11.17 (83)	Princes Park	34,000	29 July 1922
Geelong	5.9 (39)	Fitzroy	5.19 (49)	Corio Oval	15,000	29 July 1922
South Melbourne	14.15 (99)	Essendon	11.8 (74)	Lake Oval	20,000	29 July 1922

=== Round 13 ===
Home team	Home team score	Away team	Away team score	Venue	Crowd	Date
St Kilda	10.15 (75)	South Melbourne	11.9 (75)	Junction Oval	15,000	5 August 1922
Essendon	15.7 (97)	Fitzroy	12.16 (88)	Windy Hill	20,000	5 August 1922
Richmond	12.17 (89)	Geelong	11.13 (79)	Punt Road Oval	15,000	5 August 1922
Melbourne	10.4 (64)	Carlton	8.13 (61)	MCG	25,220	5 August 1922

=== Round 14 ===
Home team	Home team score	Away team	Away team score	Venue	Crowd	Date
Geelong	11.6 (72)	Melbourne	5.16 (46)	Corio Oval	8,000	19 August 1922
Essendon	15.13 (103)	Richmond	10.6 (66)	Windy Hill	25,000	19 August 1922
Carlton	14.19 (103)	South Melbourne	10.15 (75)	Princes Park	17,000	19 August 1922
St Kilda	6.10 (46)	Collingwood	8.9 (57)	Junction Oval	18,000	19 August 1922

=== Round 15 ===
Home team	Home team score	Away team	Away team score	Venue	Crowd	Date
Collingwood	8.20 (68)	Geelong	6.8 (44)	Victoria Park	8,000	26 August 1922
Richmond	5.10 (40)	Fitzroy	3.14 (32)	Punt Road Oval	5,000	26 August 1922
Melbourne	3.10 (28)	Essendon	6.8 (44)	MCG	19,206	26 August 1922
St Kilda	4.16 (40)	Carlton	5.19 (49)	Junction Oval	10,000	26 August 1922

=== Round 16 ===
Home team	Home team score	Away team	Away team score	Venue	Crowd	Date
Richmond	13.8 (86)	South Melbourne	9.10 (64)	Punt Road Oval	15,000	2 September 1922
Essendon	8.15 (63)	St Kilda	8.7 (55)	Windy Hill	15,000	2 September 1922
Fitzroy	8.14 (62)	Collingwood	11.13 (79)	Brunswick Street Oval	25,000	2 September 1922
Geelong	11.10 (76)	Carlton	16.15 (111)	Corio Oval	15,000	2 September 1922

=== Round 17 ===
Home team	Home team score	Away team	Away team score	Venue	Crowd	Date
Collingwood	11.16 (82)	Melbourne	7.11 (53)	Victoria Park	15,000	9 September 1922
Carlton	14.10 (94)	Richmond	7.8 (50)	Princes Park	25,000	9 September 1922
St Kilda	18.18 (126)	Geelong	10.11 (71)	Junction Oval	10,000	9 September 1922
South Melbourne	11.12 (78)	Fitzroy	14.9 (93)	Lake Oval	10,000	9 September 1922

=== Round 18 ===
Home team	Home team score	Away team	Away team score	Venue	Crowd	Date
Collingwood	6.11 (47)	Essendon	6.7 (43)	Victoria Park	32,000	16 September 1922
St Kilda	7.22 (64)	Richmond	5.7 (37)	Junction Oval	4,000	16 September 1922
South Melbourne	21.10 (136)	Geelong	8.10 (58)	Lake Oval	3,000	16 September 1922
Melbourne	7.13 (55)	Fitzroy	8.15 (63)	Princes Park	5,000	16 September 1922

== Ladder ==
(P)	Premiers
	Qualified for finals

#	Team	P	W	L	D	PF	PA	%	Pts
1	Collingwood	16	12	4	0	1178	922	127.8	48
2	Essendon	16	10	5	1	1147	1028	111.6	42
3	Fitzroy (P)	16	10	5	1	1091	1003	108.8	42
4	Carlton	16	10	6	0	1232	1092	112.8	40
5	Richmond	16	7	9	0	1039	1129	92.0	28
6	Melbourne	16	7	9	0	1005	1131	88.9	28
7	St Kilda	16	5	10	1	1090	1164	93.6	22
8	Geelong	16	5	11	0	1080	1285	84.0	20
9	South Melbourne	16	4	11	1	1127	1235	91.3	18

Rules for classification: 1. premiership points; 2. percentage; 3. points for
Average score: 69.4
Source: AFL Tables

== Finals series ==
All of the 1922 finals were played at the MCG, so the home team in the semi-finals and preliminary final is purely the higher-ranked team from the ladder; however, in the Grand Final, the home team was the team that won the preliminary final.

=== Semi-finals ===
Home team	Score	Away team	Score	Venue	Crowd	Date
Essendon	5.9 (39)	Carlton	4.10 (34)	MCG	64,148	23 September
Collingwood	5.12 (42)	Fitzroy	6.10 (46)	MCG	43,045	30 September

=== Preliminary final ===
Home team	Score	Away team	Score	Venue	Crowd	Date
Fitzroy	9.14 (68)	Essendon	6.9 (45)	MCG	50,021	7 October

== Season notes ==
- Essendon began playing its home games at the Essendon Recreation Reserve (known today as Windy Hill) from this season, after the closure of the East Melbourne Cricket Ground at the end of 1921.
- Boundary umpires became responsible for bringing the ball back to the centre after a goal has been scored.
- Angry Richmond fans invaded the field after Richmond's 10-point loss against Essendon in Round 5. Field umpire Arthur Norden, later received a letter threatening his life, and he retired.
- The first issue of the "pink paper", the Saturday evening newspaper The Sporting Globe, was published on 22 July 1922.
- In the Round 17 match against Geelong, St Kilda's centre half-forward Dave McNamara had 12 kicks for the match. From the twelve kicks he scored ten goals, nine of them with place kicks (one 70 yards, another 65 yards), and the tenth was scored with a punt kick. By contrast with that accurate kicking, on the following Saturday, in the Round 18 match against Richmond, McNamara kicked 1.13 (19).
- South Melbourne's percentage of 91.3% is the highest ever by the team finishing last.

== Awards ==
- The 1922 VFL Premiership team was Fitzroy.
- The VFL's leading goalkicker was Horrie Clover of Carlton with 54 goals (56 after finals).
- South Melbourne took the "wooden spoon" in 1922.
- The Victorian Junior League premiership, which is today recognised as the VFL reserves premiership, was won by Collingwood District (main: 1922 VJFL season).

== Sources ==
- 1922 VFL season at AFL Tables
- 1922 VFL season at Australian Football
