= George Shorten =

Australian rules footballer

Personal information
- Full name: George William Shorten
- Born: 19 March 1901; Kensington, Victoria
- Died: 26 June 1973 (aged 72); Parkville, Victoria
- Original team: Essendon Juniors
- Height: 163 cm (5 ft 4 in)
- Weight: 51 kg (112 lb)

Playing career^{1}
Years	Club	Games (Goals)
1923–1926	Essendon	52 (26)
- ^{1} Playing statistics correct to the end of 1926.

George William "Tich" Shorten (19 March 1901 – 26 June 1973) was an Australian rules footballer who played for Essendon in the VFL during the 1920s.

Shorten was the lightest player in Essendon's famed "Mosquito Fleet", with estimates on his weight ranging from 47 to 51 kg, making him the lightest player in league history.

Although primarily a rover he was also seen on the half forward flanks, where he played the 1923 VFL Grand Final and was named "Best on Ground".

He also participated in Essendon's premiership the following season and in 1925 represented Victoria in three interstate matches.

Shorten finished equal second in the 1924 Brownlow Medal, one vote behind the inaugural winner Edward Greeves.

Shorten was appointed coach of St. Patrick's Football Club in the Ovens and Murray Football League in May, 1927 and lead them to a premiership in his first year. Shorten played with St. Patrick's Football Club, but did not coach them in 1928.
