= Richmond premiership teams =

Australian rules football teams

The Grand Final teams for all senior Victorian Football League premierships for the Richmond Football Club.

1920 Richmond 7.10.52 v. Collingwood 5.5.35 October 2, 1920 Melbourne Cricket Ground Attendance 53,908.
B:	R.Hede	V.Thorp	E.Taylor
HB:	J.Smith	M.Hislop	G.Parkinson
C:	S.Morris	F.Hughes	R.Carew
HF:	D.Don	R.Weatherill	F.Harley
F:	H.James	D.Minogue (C/C)	W.James
Foll:	B.Herbert	D.Moffatt	C.Hall
Coach:	Dan Minogue		

1921 Richmond 5.6.36 v. Carlton 4.8.32 October 15, 1921 Melbourne Cricket Ground Attendance 43,122.
B:	E.Taylor	V.Thorp	G.Weatherill
HB:	N.McIntosh	M.Hislop	J.Smith
C:	F.Harley	M.Morris	R.Carew
HF:	D.Don	R.Weatherill	N.Turnbull
F:	B.Herbert	G.Bayliss	C.Hall
Foll:	D.Minogue (C/C)	H.James	F.Hughes
Coach:	Dan Minogue		

1932 Richmond 13.14.92 v. Carlton 12.11.83 October 1, 1932 Melbourne Cricket Ground Attendance 69,724.
B:	M.Bolger	M.Sheahan	K.O'Neill
HB:	J.Baggott	J.Murdoch	B.McCormack
C:	S.Judkins	E.Zschech	A.Geddes
HF:	J.Twyford	G.Strang	J.Titus
F:	F.Heifner	D.Strang	M.Hunter
Foll:	P.Bentley (Capt)	T.O'Halloran	R.Martin
Int:	J.Anderson		
Coach:	Frank 'Checker' Hughes		

1934 Richmond 19.14.128 v. South Melbourne 12.17.89 October 13, 1934 Melbourne Cricket Ground Attendance 65,335.
B:	M.Bolger	M.Sheahan	K.O'Neill
HB:	J.Baggott	G.Strang	B.McCormack
C:	S.Judkins	E.Zschech	A.Geddes
HF:	T.O'Halloran	D.Baxter	J.Murdoch
F:	R.Harris	J.Titus	B.Foster
Foll:	P.Bentley (C/C)	J.Dyer	R.Martin
Int:	H.Edmonds		
Coach:	Percy Bentley		

1943 Richmond 12.14.86 v. Essendon 11.15.81 September 25, 1943 Princes Park Attendance 42,100.
B:	J.Scott	R.Durham	R.Steele
HB:	R.Hunt	L.Maguire	B.Perkins
C:	L.Merrett	B.Waldron	B.Edwards
HF:	R.Quinn	J.Broadstock	B.Randall
F:	L.Cahill	B.Bawden	R.Harris
Foll:	J.Dyer (C/C)	A.Barr-Kemp	M.Oppy
Int:	L.Ablett		
Coach:	Jack Dyer		

1967 Richmond 16.18.114 v. Geelong 15.15.105 September 23, 1967 Melbourne Cricket Ground Attendance 109,396.
B:	R.Dean	F.Swift (Capt)	T.Jewell
HB:	G.Burgin	M.Perry	G.Strang
C:	F.Bourke	W.Barrot	R.Clay
HF:	J.Northey	P.Guinane	B.Richardson
F:	J.Ronaldson	R.Hart	W.Brown
Foll:	M.Patterson	A.Richardson	K.Bartlett
Int:	J.Perry	M.Green	
Coach:	Tom Hafey		

1969 Richmond 12.13.85 v. Carlton 8.12.60 September 27, 1969 Melbourne Cricket Ground Attendance 119,165.
B:	K.Sheedy	B.Richardson	C.Beard
HB:	G.Strang	G.Burgin	I.Owen
C:	F.Bourke	W.Barrot	R.Clay
HF:	R.Dean (Capt)	R.Hart	J.Northey
F:	J.Ronaldson	E.Moore	W.Brown
Foll:	M.Green	M.Bowden	K.Bartlett
Int:	G.Bond	R.Hunt	
Coach:	Tom Hafey		

1973 Richmond 16.20.116 v. Carlton 12.14.86 September 29, 1973 Melbourne Cricket Ground Attendance 116,956.
B:	L.Fowler	R.Clay	R.Hunt
HB:	F.Bourke	R.McGhie	M.Keane
C:	W.Walsh	I.Stewart	B.Wood
HF:	S.Rae	R.Hart (Capt)	K.Sheedy
F:	N.Carter	N.Balme	M.Green
Foll:	B.Roberts	P.Sproule	K.Bartlett
Int:	K.Morris	C.McKellar	
Coach:	Tom Hafey		

1974 Richmond 18.20.128 v. North Melbourne 13.9.87 September 28, 1974 Melbourne Cricket Ground Attendance 113,839.
B:	M.Keane	R.Clay	G.Andrews
HB:	F.Bourke	R.McGhie	K.Morris
C:	B.Wood	D.Thorpe	W.Walsh
HF:	D.Cloke	R.Hart (Capt)	P.Sproule
F:	D.Cumming	B.Richardson	N.Balme
Foll:	M.Green	K.Sheedy	K.Bartlett
Int:	C.Clayton	B.Roberts	
Coach:	Tom Hafey		

1980 Richmond 23.21.159 v. Collingwood 9.24.78 September 27, 1980 Melbourne Cricket Ground Attendance 113,461.
B:	M.Malthouse	F.Bourke	E.Dunne
HB:	G.Strachan	S.Mount	T.Smith
C:	P.Welsh	G.Raines	B.Wood
HF:	B.Rowlings	J.Jess	K.Bartlett (NS)
F:	D.Cloke	M.Roach	D.Weightman
Foll:	M.Lee	M.Keane	R.Wiley
Int:	B.Monteath (Capt)	D.Freame	
Coach:	Tony Jewell		

2017 Richmond 16.12.108 v. Adelaide 8.12.60 September 30, 2017 Melbourne Cricket Ground Attendance 100,021.
B:	N.Broad	A.Rance	D.Grimes
HB:	B.Houli	D.Astbury	N.Vlastuin
C:	K.Mcintosh	T.Cotchin (Capt)	J.Townsend
HF:	K.Lambert	D.Martin (NS)	J.Caddy
F:	D.Butler	J.Riewoldt	D.Rioli
Foll:	T.Nankervis	D.Prestia	S.Grigg
Int:	B.Ellis	S.Edwards	J.Graham
Int:	J.Castagna		
Coach:	Damien Hardwick		

2019 Richmond 17.12.114 v. GWS 3.7.25 September 28, 2019 Melbourne Cricket Ground Attendance 100,014.
B:	David Astbury	Nathan Broad	Dylan Grimes
HB:	Bachar Houli	Nick Vlastuin	Jayden Short
C:	Brandon Ellis	Dion Prestia	Josh Caddy
HF:	Daniel Rioli	Trent Cotchin (Capt)	Kane Lambert
F:	Jason Castagna	Tom Lynch	Jack Riewoldt
Foll:	Toby Nankervis	Shane Edwards	Dustin Martin (NS)
Int:	Shai Bolton	Ivan Soldo	Liam Baker
Int:	Marlion Pickett		
Coach:	Damien Hardwick		

2020 Richmond 12.9.81 v. Geelong 7.8.50 October 24, 2020 The Gabba Attendance 29,707.
B:	David Astbury	Dylan Grimes	Noah Balta
HB:	Bachar Houli	Nick Vlastuin	Liam Baker
C:	Kamdyn McIntosh	Dion Prestia	Marlion Pickett
HF:	Kane Lambert	Dustin Martin (NS)	Jason Castagna
F:	Daniel Rioli	Tom Lynch	Jack Riewoldt
Foll:	Toby Nankervis	Trent Cotchin (Capt)	Shane Edwards
Int:	Jayden Short	Jack Graham	Shai Bolton
Int:	Nathan Broad		
Coach:	Damien Hardwick		

(Capt) = Captain, (C/C) = Captain/Coach (NS) = Norm Smith Medal
