= 1920 VFL grand final =

Grand final of the 1920 Victorian Football League season

1920 VFL Grand Final

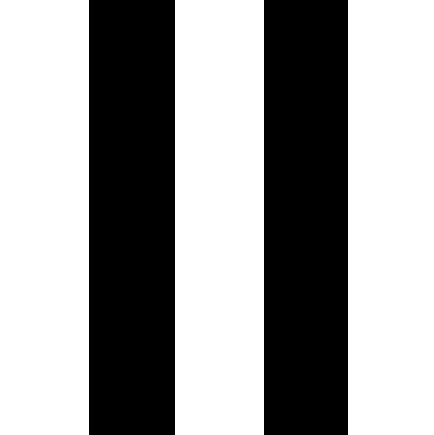
Richmond	Collingwood
7.10 (52)	5.5 (35)
	1	2	3	4
RICH	1.2 (8)	2.5 (17)	4.7 (31)	7.10 (52)
COLL	1.2 (8)	1.2 (8)	3.4 (22)	5.5 (35)
- Date: 2 October 1920
- Stadium: Melbourne Cricket Ground
- Attendance: 53,908

The 1920 VFL Grand Final was an Australian rules football game contested between the Richmond Football Club and Collingwood Football Club, held at the Melbourne Cricket Ground in Melbourne on 2 October 1920. It was the 23rd annual Grand Final of the Victorian Football League, staged to determine the premiers for the 1920 VFL season. The match, attended by 53,908 spectators, was won by Richmond by a margin of 17 points, marking that club's first VFL/AFL premiership victory.

== Score ==
Team	1	2	3	Final
Richmond	1.2	2.5	4.7	7.10 (52)
Collingwood	1.2	1.2	3.4	5.5 (35)

== Teams ==
Richmond	Collingwood

Richmond
B:	Reg Hede	Vic Thorp	Ernest Taylor
HB:	George Parkinson	Max Hislop	James Smith
C:	Stan Morris	Checker Hughes	Robert Carew
HF:	Donald Don	Bob Weatherill	Frank Harley
F:	Hugh James	Dan Minogue (c)	Billy James
Foll:	Barney Herbert	David Moffatt	Clarrie Hall
Coach:	Dan Minogue		

Collingwood
B:	Gus Dobrigh	Harry Saunders	Bert Colechin
HB:	Charlie Brown	Percy Rowe	Charlie Tyson
C:	Tom Drummond	Charlie Pannam	Bill Twomey
HF:	Ernie Wilson	Gordon Coventry	Maurie Sheehy
F:	Ernie Lumsden (c)	Harry Curtis	Percy Wilson
Foll:	Les Hughes	Con McCarthy	Charlie Laxton
Coach:	Jock McHale		

- Umpire – Jack Elder

== Statistics ==
=== Goalkickers ===
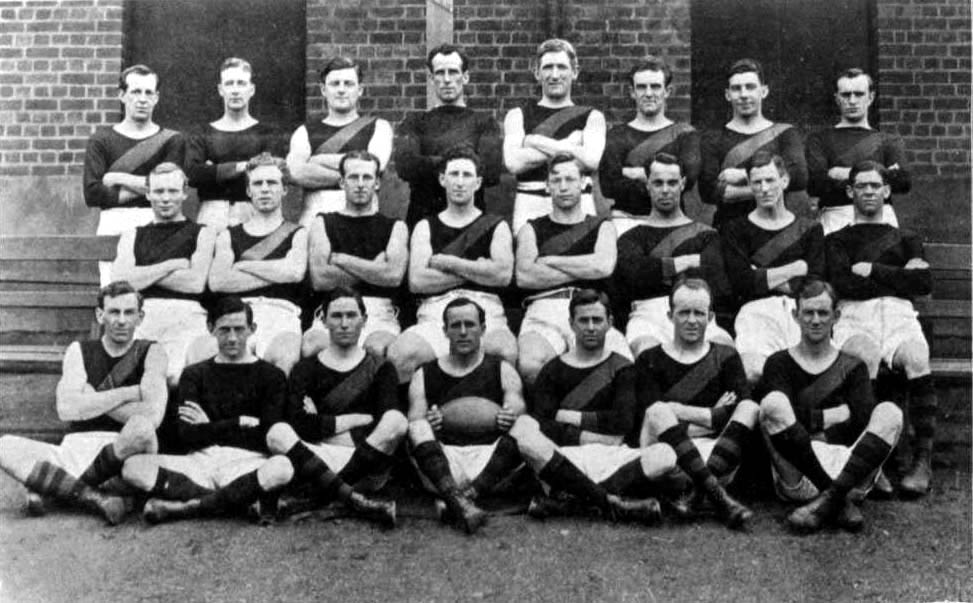
Richmond FC, premiers

Richmond:

- C Hall 1
- F Harley 1
- B James 1
- H James 1
- B Weatherill 1

Runners Up:

- G Coventry 3
- E Lumsden 1
- M Sheehy 1

== See also ==
- 1920 VFL season
