= 1919 VFL grand final =

Grand final of the 1919 Victorian Football League season

1919 VFL Grand Final
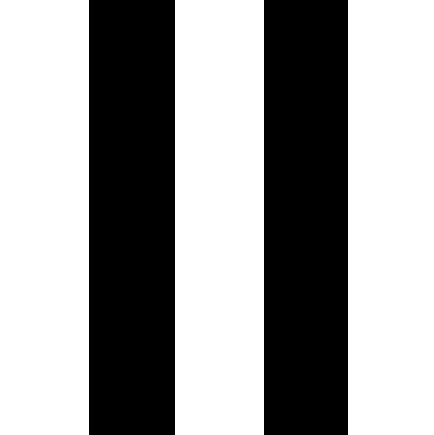

Collingwood	Richmond
11.12 (78)	7.11 (53)
	1	2	3	4
COLL	1.5 (11)	5.5 (35)	8.8 (56)	11.12 (78)
RICH	1.2 (8)	4.7 (31)	5.10 (40)	7.11 (53)
- Date: 11 October 1919
- Stadium: Melbourne Cricket Ground
- Attendance: 45,413

The 1919 VFL Grand Final was an Australian rules football game contested between the Collingwood Football Club and Richmond Football Club, held at the Melbourne Cricket Ground in Melbourne on 11 October 1919. It was the 22nd annual Grand Final of the Victorian Football League, staged to determine the premiers for the 1919 VFL season. The match, attended by 45,413 spectators, was won by Collingwood by a margin of 25 points, marking that club's fifth premiership victory.

== Teams ==
Collingwood	Richmond

Collingwood
B:	Wally Haysom	Harry Saunders	Maurie Sheehy
HB:	Alec Mutch	Bill Walton	Bert Colechin
C:	Tom Drummond	Charlie Pannam	Bill Twomey
HF:	Ernie Wilson	Harry Curtis	Mal Seddon
F:	Pen Reynolds	Dick Lee	Ernie Lumsden
Foll:	Les Hughes	Con McCarthy (c)	Charlie Laxton
Coach:	Jock McHale		

Richmond
B:	Artie Bettles	Vic Thorp	Paddy Abbott
HB:	Frank Huggard	Max Hislop	George Parkinson
C:	Stan Morris	Checker Hughes	Reg Hede
HF:	George Bayliss	Percy Maybury (c)	Frank Harley
F:	James Smith	Hugh James	Donald Don
Foll:	Barney Herbert	David Moffatt	Clarrie Hall
Coach:	Norm Clark		

- Umpire – Jack Elder

== Statistics ==
=== Goalkickers ===
Collingwood:

- D Lee 3
- M Seddon 2
- H Curtis 1
- L Hughes 1
- C Laxton 1
- E Lumsden 1
- B Twomey 1
- B Walton 1

Richmond:

- G Bayliss 2
- D Don 2
- H James 2
- F Harley 1

== See also ==
- 1919 VFL season
