= 1921 VFL grand final =

Grand final of the 1921 Victorian Football League season

1921 VFL Grand Final
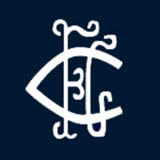

Carlton	Richmond
4.8 (32)	5.6 (36)
	1	2	3	4
CAR	2.2 (14)	3.4 (22)	3.6 (24)	4.8 (32)
RICH	1.2 (8)	1.3 (9)	3.4 (22)	5.6 (36)
- Date: 15 October 1921
- Stadium: Melbourne Cricket Ground
- Attendance: 43,122

The 1921 VFL Grand Final was an Australian rules football game contested between the Carlton Football Club and Richmond Football Club, held at the Melbourne Cricket Ground in Melbourne on 15 October 1921. It was the 24th annual Grand Final of the Victorian Football League, staged to determine the premiers for the 1921 VFL season. The match, attended by 43,122 spectators, was won by Richmond by a margin of 4 points, marking that club's second VFL/AFL premiership victory and second in succession.

== Score ==
Team	1	2	3	Final
Richmond	1.2	1.3	3.4	5.6 (36)
Carlton	2.2	3.4	3.6	4.8 (32)

== Teams ==
Richmond	Carlton

Richmond
B:	George Weatherill	Vic Thorp	Ernest Taylor
HB:	Norm McIntosh	Max Hislop	James Smith
C:	Frank Harley	Mel Morris	Robert Carew
HF:	Donald Don	Robert Weatherill	Norm Turnbull
F:	Barney Herbert	George Bayliss	Clarrie Hall
Foll:	Dan Minogue (c)	Hugh James	Checker Hughes
Coach:	Dan Minogue		

Carlton
B:	Harry Toole	Ernie Jamieson	Croft McKenzie
HB:	Wally Raleigh	Paddy O'Brien	Jack Greenhill
C:	Jack Stephenson	Billy Blackman	Newton Chandler
HF:	Alex Duncan	Horrie Clover	Bert Boromeo
F:	Percy Daykin	Gordon Green (c)	Charlie Fisher
Foll:	Frank Martin	Rupe Hiskins	Stewart McLatchie
Coach:	Norm Clark		

- Umpire – Jack McMurray

== Statistics ==
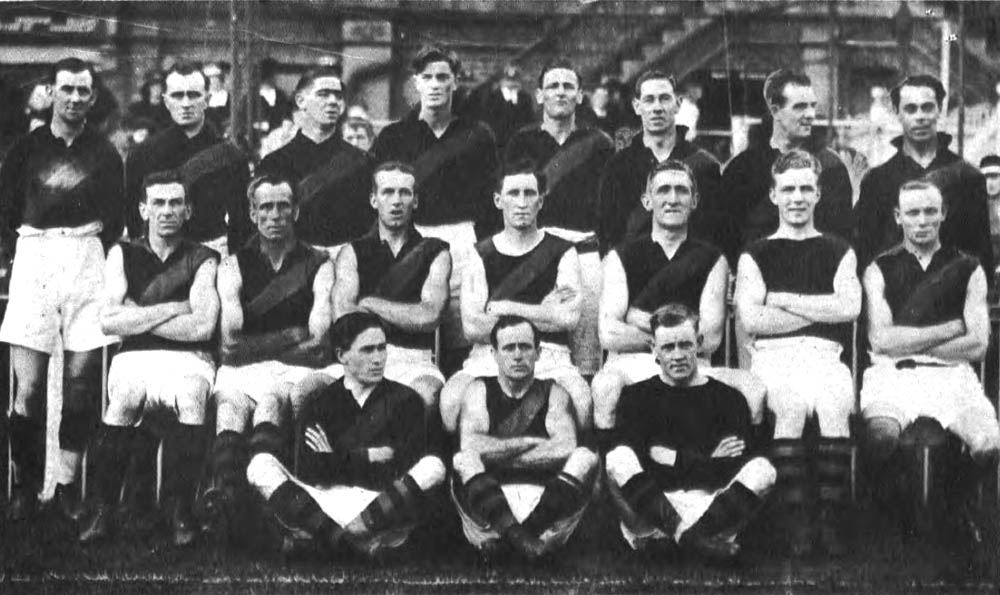
Richmond FC, premiers

=== Goalkickers ===
Richmond:

- G Bayliss 2
- H James 1
- M Morris 1
- N Turnbull 1

Carlton:

- B Boromeo 1
- A Duncan 1
- S McLatchie 1
- J Stephenson 1

== See also ==
- 1921 VFL season
