= Donald Don =

Australian rules footballer (1900–1982)

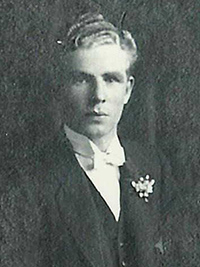

Personal information
- Full name: Donald McKenzie Don
- Born: 17 August 1900; Collingwood, Victoria
- Died: 31 May 1982 (aged 81); Fairfield, Victoria
- Original team: Richmond Ramblers United
- Height: 175 cm (5 ft 9 in)
- Weight: 76 kg (168 lb)

Playing career^{1}
Years	Club	Games (Goals)
1917–1928	Richmond	158 (157)
- ^{1} Playing statistics correct to the end of 1928.

Career highlights
- Richmond Premiership Player 1920, 1921; Richmond Leading Goalkicker 1918, 1919; Interstate Games:- 2; Richmond Hall of Fame, inducted 2015

Donald McKenzie Don (17 August 1900 – 31 May 1982) was an Australian rules footballer who played in the Victorian Football League (VFL) between 1917 and 1928 for the Richmond Football Club. He played in both the 1920 and 1921 Richmond premiership teams.

== Family ==
The seventh, and last child of Collingwood-born Robert Balfour Don (1862–1941), and Tasmanian Johanna Mary Frances "Annie" Don (1858–1948), born Guppy, who along with a number of her siblings later assumed the family name James, Donald McKenzie Don was born at Collingwood, Victoria, on 17 August 1900.

He married Matilda Maud Goodfellow (1900–1968), at St. Michael's Church of England, at Prince's Hill, on 30 June 1925. They had two children. One of his sons, Kenneth Robert McKenzie Don (1926–2014), tried out with Richmond in 1945.

== Football ==
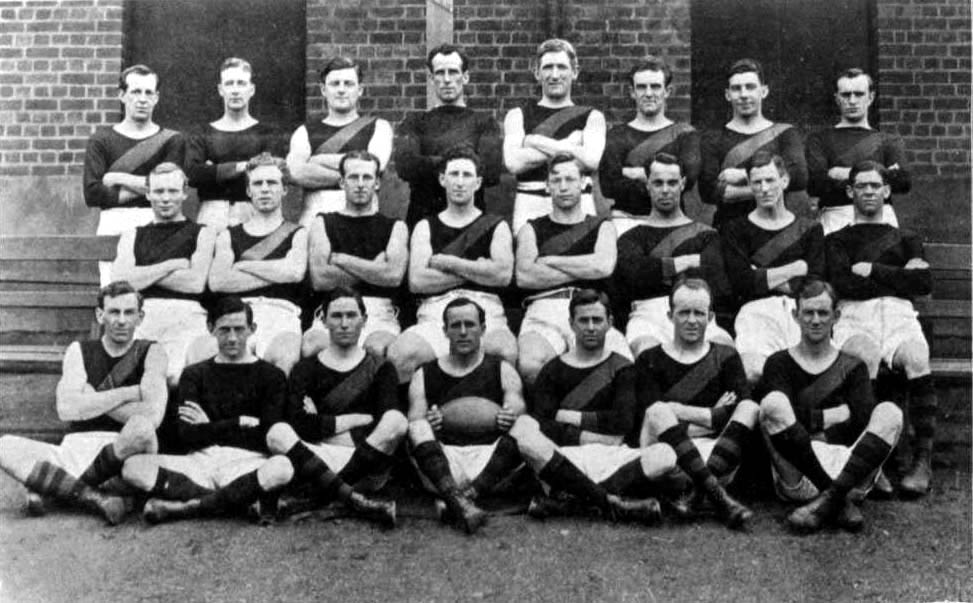
Richmond's 1920 Premiership Team: Don, second from left, middle row.

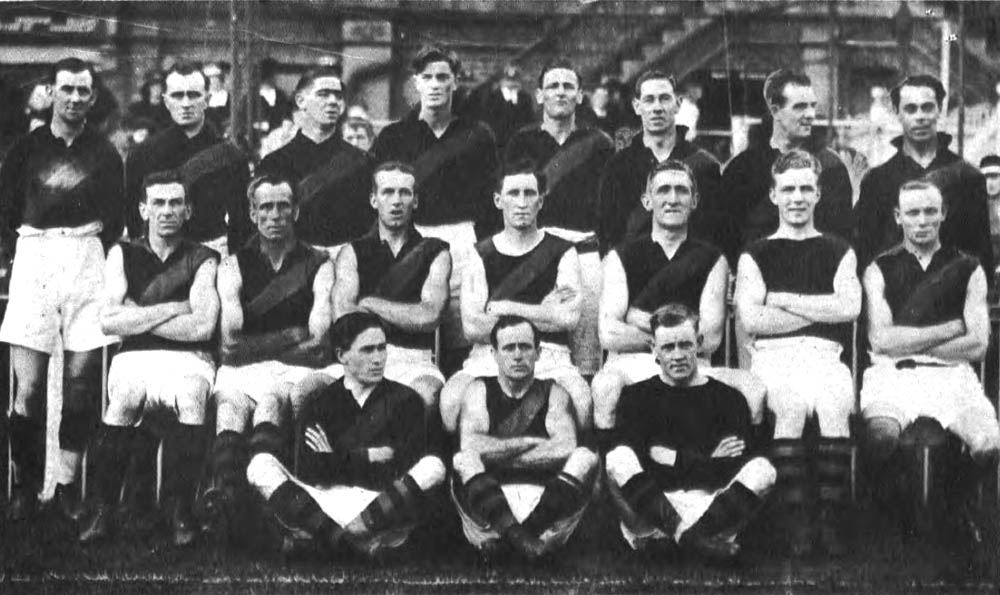
Richmond's 1921 Premiership Team: Don, second from right, middle row.

=== Richmond (VFL) ===
Recruited from a local church football team, Don made his debut, at the age of 16, against Fitzroy, at the Brunswick Street Oval, on 4 June 1917 as the resting forward-pocket rover, having already played in a torrid game two days earlier:

"Don, a fair-haired boy from the Richmond United team, did fairly well up forward.
More will be heard of him.
On the previous Saturday he roved right through a very rough game at the City Reserve between the Surrey and Richmond United, and was quite the best man-on the ground.
After playing such a hard game, he would hardly be in condition to do himself justice in a League match two days later, but he came out very well indeed." — The Richmond Guardian, 9 June 1917.

He played in 158 games, and kicked 157 goals — the club's leading goal-kicker in 1918 (19 goals) and 1919 (31 goals) — for Richmond over 12 seasons.

"He was a skilful, talented player who knew where the goals were when playing on the forward line.
Although not a tall player [at 5ft 9in], he was a fine mark, glorious long drop kick and relied on anticipation rather than pace to win the ball." — Paul Hogan, The Tigers of Old (1996).

Originally selected as a rover, once Vic Thorp had retired, he became a champion full-back.

"When Richmond had their great premiership sides of 1920 and 1921 in full swing young Don was a valuable member of the side.
The first ruck consisted of Bernie Herbert, Dave Moffatt and Clarrie Hall, who were three grand players.
Then the second ruck, consisting of Dan Minogue, Hughie James and Donald Don, was little, if at all, inferior to the first ruck.
Don was a strong, tenacious rover who had great stamina.
He also had speed and was clever when in possession of the ball, as he could turn quickly and kick accurately over distances or when passing.
. . .
When he was disqualified by the Tribunal, Don was inclined to give the game up.
He felt that he had had enough, and it was only the repeated persuasions of the Richmond committeemen which induced him to change his mind.
In addition to roving and playing forward he figured prominently across the centreline when played there.
The retirement of that great full-back, Victor Thorpe [sic], was a big blow to Richmond, and they were somewhat dubious as to the possibility of filling his position satisfactorily.
Hitherto Don had felt a great dislike for the full-back position, and once refused to play there.
In 1927, however, he conceived a strong liking for the position, and began practising there.
His good kicking and sound judgment soon fitted him admirably for the position, and Richmond selectors had no hesitation in placing him full-back." — The Sporting Globe, 28 April 1928.

=== VFL Representative ===
He played at full-back for Victoria in the 13 August 1927 Carnival match against South Australia; and he was the full-back (and team vice-captain) of the representative VFL side that played against a combined Bendigo League team, at Bendigo, on 25 August 1928.

== Four Grand Finals ==
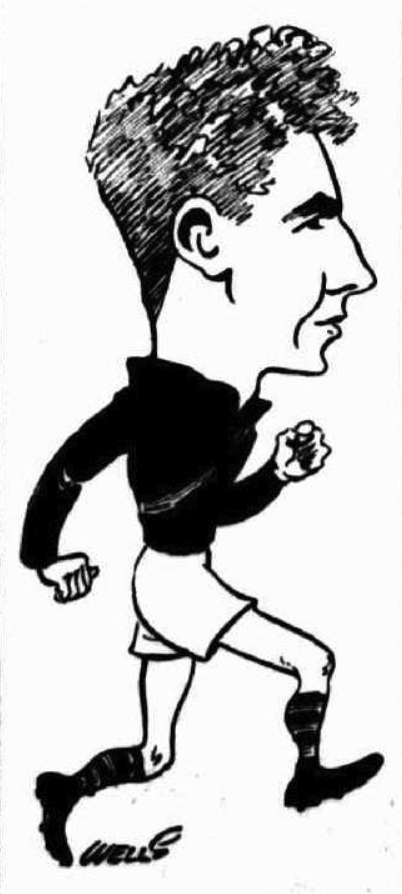
Donald Don (Wells, 1924).

He played 10 Finals games, including four Grand Finals:

- 1919: as the resting forward-pocket rover in the Richmond team that lost the 1919 Grand Final 7.11 (53) to Collingwood's 11.12 (78) (he kicked 2 goals).
- 1920: on the half-forward flank for the Richmond team that beat Collingwood in the 1920 Grand Final 7.10 (52) to 5.5 (35) (he kicked 2 goals).
- 1921: on the half-forward flank for the Richmond team that beat Carlton in the 1921 Grand Final 5.6 (36) to 4.8 (32).
- 1924: unable to play in the Premiership matches in the 1924 "Round Robin" VFL Finals series due to his suspension.
- 1927: unable to play in the Richmond team that lost the 1927 Grand Final 1.7 (13) to Collingwood's 2.13 (25) — a match that was played in the atrocious conditions of torrential rain and freezing winds — due to a shoulder injury he had sustained when playing representative football for Victoria at the 1927 ANFC Carnival.
- 1928: as team captain, and full-back, for the Richmond team that lost the 1928 Grand Final 9.9 (63) to Collingwood's 13.18 (96).

== VFL Tribunal ==
Known to be "a fiery player" at times, he was controversially suspended twice in his career.

=== 8 October 1921 match (8 games) ===
As a consequence of a subsequent, official VFL investigation, that had been independently instigated by the secretary (and VFL delegate) of the rival Collingwood Football Club, Ernest Copeland — it is significant that Don had not been reported by any of the match officials on the day of the match — Don was suspended for eight games following an incident during the first quarter of the 1921 Preliminary Finals game, against Carlton, on 8 October 1921, in which Carlton's Jack Greenhill had been knocked unconscious.

=== 21 June 1924 match ("remainder of the season": 11 games) ===
Following an incident in third quarter of the rough, spiteful, and congested match against Carlton, at Princes Park, on 21 June 1924 — Richmond 5.8 (38) to Carlton's 3.19 (28) — in which he had scored 3 of the team's 5 goals, Don was reported for charging Carlton's full-forward, Newton Chandler.

Two others were reported in the match: Richmond's Reuben Reid was reported for two offences, for charging Carlton's Horrie Clover, and for charging Carlton's Alex Duncan; and Alex Duncan was reported for three offences, for kicking Richmond's George Rudolph, for striking Reuben Reid, and for "making an offensive motion towards Boundary Umpire Johnson" — the match report noted that "at times the game was little better than a scramble, the bumping heavy, and not always fair, and though three players have been reported, it would have occasioned no surprise if at least two others had to face the investigative tribunal".

The tribunal hearing took place on 26 June 1924, under the chairmanship of VFL President (and Carlton delegate) Walter Baldwin Spencer, assisted by the St Kilda delegate, Harry Duigan, and the former champion athlete, George Allen Moir. Reid was disqualified for three games for charging Clover, and was exonerated of the offence of charging Duncan; to the astonishment of many, Duncan was found not guilty of all three charges; in contrast, however, Don was (inexplicably, in light of the conflicting evidence presented) found to be guilty of charging Chandler, and "in view of the fact that he had been previously disqualified [the Tribunal determined that] he would have to stand down for the rest of the season".

Although it had two more scoring shots, Richmond lost to South Melbourne, 5.13 (43) to 9.7 (61), at the Lake Oval, on the Saturday immediately following Don's disqualification (i.e., 28 June 1924).

== Aftermath ==
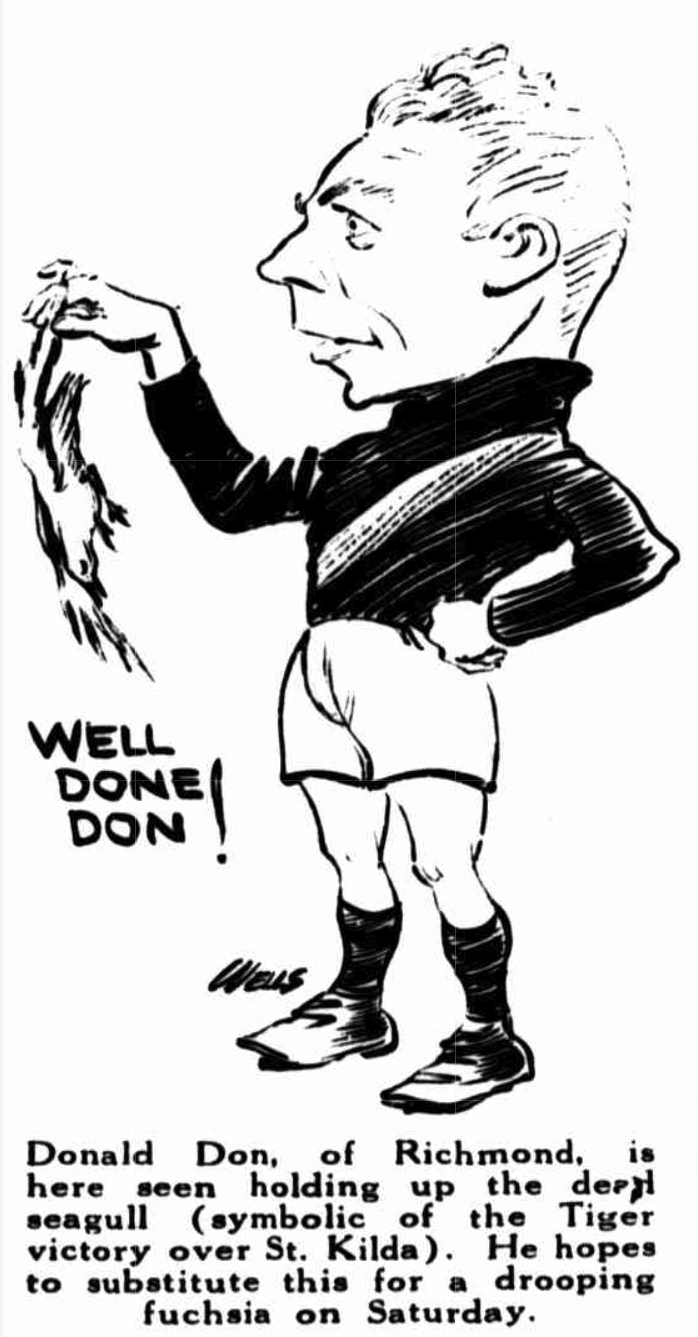
Donald Don (Wells, 1924).

=== Don's Letter ===
On 30 June, the Melbourne Herald published an open letter from Don, dated Saturday, 28 June, in which he announced that, as a consequence of the "injustice" of the Tribunal's characterisation of himself as "a vicious and ruthless player", and from the fact that it seemed that the Richmond Football Club, rather than himself alone, had also been on trial and, also, that "it was quite evident . . . [from the fact that] in less than a minute the verdict was announced . . . that their minds were made up before any evidence was given", he had "definitely decided to take no further part in any match whilst football is governed by the present tribunal".

=== Richmond Football Club ===
At the Tuesday, 1 July 1924 meeting of the Richmond Football Club Committee — i.e., subsequent to both the Tribunal's decision and the publication of Don's letter — there was "long discussion . . . in regard to the severe treatment meted out to some of its players by the League tribunal and the Umpire and Permit Committee". Having accepted the fact that the publication of Don's letter had made any appeal for the re-hearing of his case "inadvisable", the committee passed the following resolution, a copy of which was also sent on to both Don and to the tribunal:

"That in the opinion of this committee Donald Don was entirely innocent of the charge laid against him in the recent Carlton v. Richmond match, and for which he was disqualified."

=== Public opinion ===
There was certainly strong basis for the widely-held views that Richmond had not only been harshly treated by the VFL, but, also (when compared with other VFL clubs), had been treated extremely unfairly — especially in the context of the 1921 Tribunal's extraordinary decision to investigate an unreported incident at the behest of the Collingwood delegate, and its subsequent determination of Don's guilt, and the severity (8 games) of his sentence — and, in particular, in the following ways over the immediately preceding 8 days:

(1) the Permit Committee's outright refusal, on 18 June and 25 June 1924, to endorse the willingly-granted-by-Carlton clearances of three ex-Carlton footballers, now resident in Richmond's territory, George Bolt, Bert Boromeo, and Jack Morrissey, to Richmond.
(2) the Permit Committee's inexplicable and unjust decision, on 25 June 1924 — Paul Hogan (1996, p.135) is most emphatic that this was entirely due to Carlton's Horrie Clover "[having] discovered that [Maxfield] had lived in Carlton's zone, when playing with Northcote in 1921" — to de-register the brilliant "Snowy Maxfield" (see: Maxfield's VFL permit cancelled).
(3) the Tribunal's unreasonable and extraordinary decision, on 26 June 1924, in relation to both the determination of Don's guilt and the severity of his "remainder of season" sentence.

and, from this, it is not fanciful to suppose that, had Bolt, Boromeo, Don, Maxfield, and Morrissey been available for selection, a far stronger Richmond team would not have been the "runner-up" in the "Round Robin" contest for the 1924 VFL Premiership, but would have been the 1924 premiers.

=== "Old Boy" ===
In two separate pieces published in the Melbourne Argus of the morning of 4 July 1924, the eminent and well-respected football authority and journalist, Reginald Wilmot, known as "Old Boy", addressed the issues raised by the cases of Don and Maxfield.

He wrote that, in his view, and in relation to the VFL's treatment of both Maxfield and Don, it certainly was Richmond's "bad luck" to have had these "two debatable decisions so close together". Wilmot, who had been present at Maxfield's hearing, strongly felt that Maxfield — who "had nothing to gain by suppressing information" — had grounds for an appeal, and that his disqualification for, at least, the remainder of the 1924 season was "very drastic".

Applauding the "temperate tone" of the Richmond Committee's resolution in the "Don Case", he went on to vigorously question both the Don verdict and his disqualification: "In Don's case . . . the crime—if crime there was—does not seem to fit the punishment". He continued:

"I have heard on all sides regret that Don should have been disqualified, and not from Richmond people, but from supporters of other clubs, of Carlton especially.
So strong is the feeling that Carlton supporters are indignant, and I am told Carlton players, and Chandler himself, who was supposed to have been charged [by Don], were astounded when they heard the verdict.
In these circumstances [and given the decision of the Richmond Football Club not to lodge an appeal] it would be a graceful and sportsmanlike action for Carlton people to approach the tribunal, and ask for a reopening."

=== "Kickero" ===
In the Melbourne Herald, that afternoon, the equally eminent and well-respected football authority and journalist, Tom Kelynack, known as "Kickero", whilst observing that, in combination, these three separate events, were a "blow [that had fallen] on the club just at a time when the team had run into such improved form that it was winning matches", also emphatically expressed his strong view that the Permit Committee had not been justified in its refusal to grant the clearances of Bolt, Boromeo, and Morrissey from Carlton to Richmond.

== Richmond Football Club Life Membership ==
He was awarded Life Membership of the Richmond Football Club in 1926.

== The Sporting Globe ==
Following his retirement from football at the end of the 1928 season, he was employed by The Sporting Globe as a regular member of its "football staff"; and continued to report for it for, at least, 12 seasons (1929–1941).

== Death ==
He died at Fairfield, Victoria, on 31 May 1982.

== "Hall of Fame" ==
In 2015 he was inducted into the Richmond Football Club's "Hall of Fame".

== See also ==
- 1927 Melbourne Carnival
