= 1921 Perth Carnival =

Tournament information
- Sport: Australian football
- Location: Perth, Australia
- Dates: 6 August 1921–13 August 1921
- Format: Round Robin
- Teams: 3

Final champion
- Western Australia

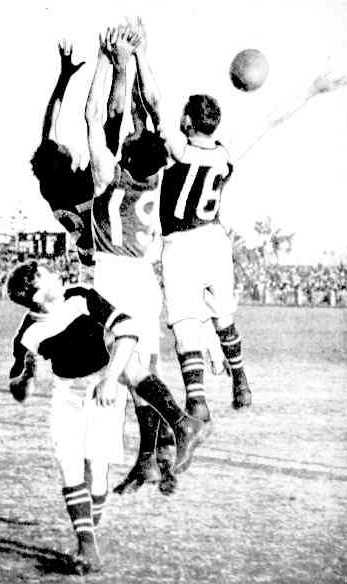
South Australia vs Western Australia Perth Oval 1921

The 1921 Perth Carnival was the fourth edition of the Australian National Football Carnival, an Australian football interstate competition, staged in August 1921. It was the first carnival to take place in Perth and was won by the home state, Western Australia.

The decision to stage the carnival in Perth represented a significant additional expense for the carnival, as the transcontinental travel expenses for the visiting states were much higher. New South Wales and Queensland quickly withdrew, and Tasmania equivocated but ultimately decided likewise, resulting in a small carnival of only three teams. Nevertheless, the council saw benefit in staging the carnival in Perth to consolidate the strength of Australian rules football in the city, as it had seen post-war growth in the popularity of soccer as a rival code.

Ultimately, the carnival made a good profit, with a total gate of £5530 more than covering the visiting teams' travel expenses of £2000. The crowd of 26,461 drawn to the final match between Western Australia and South Australia set a new record for the highest sports attendance in Western Australian history.

In a famous conclusion to the match between Victoria and Western Australia, star Victorian full forward Dick Lee marked within scoring distance, and prepared a place kick which would have given Victoria the lead. He then played on (gathering the placed ball as he ran past it), and was tackled by Nipper Truscott as the final bell sounded.

== Players ==
=== Victoria ===
Victoria Carnival Squad
Manager: E. W. Copeland (Collingwood)
Carlton: A. Boromeo, H. Clover, J. Greenhill, R. Hiskins

Collingwood: C. Brown, T. Drummond, W. H. Lee, J. C. McCarthy (capt.), C. Pannam
Essendon: P. Ogden
Fitzroy: G. Taylor
Geelong: A. Eason, L. Hagger, A. Rankin (vice-capt.), C. Rankin
Melbourne: G. Haines
Richmond: M. Hislop, J. Smith, G. Thorp
St Kilda: W. Cubbins
South Melbourne: R. Cazaly, M. Tandy

=== Western Australia ===
Western Australian Carnival Squad
East Fremantle: L. Cinoris, F. Ion, R. Mudie, W. Truscott

East Perth: E. Allen, R. Brentnall, W. Hebbard, W. Thomas
Perth: A. Hewby, C. Hoft
South Fremantle: W. Adams, H. Campbell, W. Gunnyon, W. Heindrichs
Subiaco: C. Bahen, N. Ford, A. Green, T. Outridge, W. Steele
West Perth: H. Boyd, A. Sheedy, F. Wimbridge

=== South Australia ===
South Australian Carnival Squad
Manager: C. V. Tyler (Port Adelaide)
Glenelg: J. Hanley

North Adelaide: J. Hamilton, T. Leahy (capt.), P. Lewis, G. Trescowthick
Norwood: T. Hart, C. Packham, W. Scott
Port Adelaide: C. Adams, S. Hosking, H. W. Oliver (vice-capt.)
South Adelaide: W. Allen, J. Daly, S. McKee, D. Moriarty, J. Vickers
Sturt: O. Beatty, F. H. Golding
West Adelaide: J. Bishop, L. Cossey, V. Peters
West Torrens: E. Daviess, J. Karney

== Results ==
	1921 Perth Carnival
Saturday, 6 August (3:00pm)	Victoria 11.12 (78)	def.	South Australia 6.7 (43)	Fremantle Oval (crowd: 15,000)
Wednesday, 10 August (3:00pm)	Western Australia 6.16 (52)	def.	Victoria 6.11 (47)	Subiaco Oval (crowd: 18,200)
Saturday, 13 August (3:00pm)	Western Australia 12.3 (75)	def.	South Australia 9.11 (65)	Perth Oval (crowd: 26,461)

=== Ladder ===
1921 Perth Carnival ladder
Pos	Team	Pld	W	L	D	Pts
1	Western Australia	2	2	0	0	8
2	Victoria	2	1	1	0	4
3	South Australia	2	0	2	0	0
