= 1920 VFL season =

24th season of the Victorian Football League (VFL)

1920 VFL premiership season
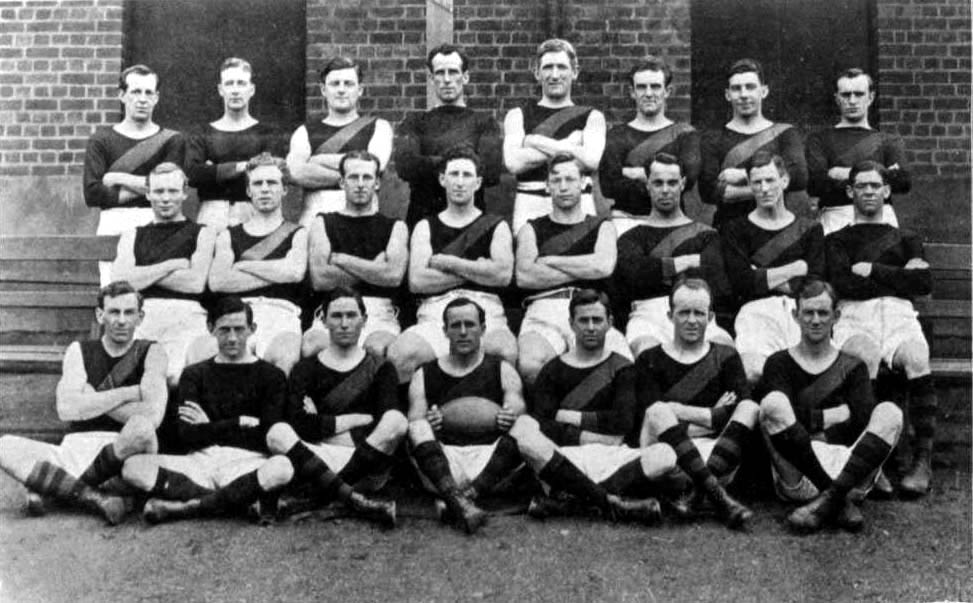
- Richmond 1920 VFL premiership team
- Date: 1 May – 2 October 1920
- Teams: 9
- Premiers: Richmond; 1st premiership
- Minor premiers: Richmond; 1st minor premiership
- Leading goalkicker medallist: George Bayliss (Richmond); 62 goals
- Matches played: 76

The 1920 VFL season was the 24th season of the Victorian Football League (VFL), the highest-level senior Australian rules football competition in Victoria. The season featured nine clubs and ran from 1 May to 2 October, comprising a 16-match home-and-away season followed by a four-week finals series featuring the top four clubs.

Richmond won the premiership, defeating Collingwood by 17 points in the 1920 VFL grand final; it was Richmond's first VFL premiership. Richmond also won the minor premiership by finishing atop the home-and-away ladder with a 14–2 win–loss record. Richmond's George Bayliss won the leading goalkicker medal as the league's leading goalkicker.

== Background ==
In 1920, the VFL competition consisted of nine teams of 18 on-the-field players each, with no "reserves", although any of the 18 players who had left the playing field for any reason could later resume their place on the field at any time during the match.

Each team played each other twice in a home-and-away season of 18 rounds (i.e., 16 matches and 2 byes).

Once the 18 round home-and-away season had finished, the 1920 VFL Premiers were determined by the specific format and conventions of the amended "Argus system".

== Home-and-away season ==
=== Round 1 ===
Home team	Home team score	Away team	Away team score	Venue	Date
Melbourne	9.13 (67)	South Melbourne	8.7 (55)	MCG	1 May 1920
Fitzroy	8.11 (59)	Richmond	11.13 (79)	Brunswick Street Oval	1 May 1920
Collingwood	5.6 (36)	Essendon	7.12 (54)	Victoria Park	1 May 1920
Carlton	10.10 (70)	St Kilda	5.11 (41)	Princes Park	1 May 1920

=== Round 2 ===
Home team	Home team score	Away team	Away team score	Venue	Date
Essendon	9.11 (65)	Melbourne	12.8 (80)	EMCG	8 May 1920
South Melbourne	6.13 (49)	Fitzroy	12.7 (79)	Lake Oval	8 May 1920
Geelong	7.8 (50)	Collingwood	7.13 (55)	Corio Oval	8 May 1920
Richmond	14.13 (97)	Carlton	9.14 (68)	Punt Road Oval	8 May 1920

=== Round 3 ===
Home team	Home team score	Away team	Away team score	Venue	Date
Essendon	7.13 (55)	South Melbourne	9.9 (63)	EMCG	15 May 1920
Collingwood	4.20 (44)	Melbourne	3.5 (23)	Victoria Park	15 May 1920
Carlton	3.11 (29)	Fitzroy	5.8 (38)	Princes Park	15 May 1920
St Kilda	11.12 (78)	Geelong	8.8 (56)	Junction Oval	15 May 1920

=== Round 4 ===
Home team	Home team score	Away team	Away team score	Venue	Date
Melbourne	11.15 (81)	St Kilda	5.11 (41)	MCG	22 May 1920
Geelong	10.4 (64)	Richmond	9.19 (73)	Corio Oval	22 May 1920
Fitzroy	9.7 (61)	Collingwood	7.11 (53)	Brunswick Street Oval	22 May 1920
Essendon	7.13 (55)	Carlton	14.17 (101)	EMCG	22 May 1920

=== Round 5 ===
Home team	Home team score	Away team	Away team score	Venue	Date
Fitzroy	13.18 (96)	Geelong	8.8 (56)	Brunswick Street Oval	26 May 1920
St Kilda	8.6 (54)	Essendon	8.15 (63)	Junction Oval	26 May 1920
Richmond	11.12 (78)	Collingwood	10.11 (71)	Punt Road Oval	26 May 1920
South Melbourne	8.10 (58)	Carlton	4.15 (39)	Lake Oval	26 May 1920

=== Round 6 ===
Home team	Home team score	Away team	Away team score	Venue	Date
Richmond	9.7 (61)	South Melbourne	5.4 (34)	Punt Road Oval	5 June 1920
Carlton	7.24 (66)	Melbourne	13.6 (84)	Princes Park	5 June 1920
Essendon	13.26 (104)	Geelong	12.13 (85)	EMCG	7 June 1920
Collingwood	12.11 (83)	St Kilda	7.10 (52)	Victoria Park	7 June 1920

=== Round 7 ===
Home team	Home team score	Away team	Away team score	Venue	Date
St Kilda	7.11 (53)	South Melbourne	13.10 (88)	Junction Oval	12 June 1920
Melbourne	10.8 (68)	Richmond	12.16 (88)	MCG	12 June 1920
Fitzroy	6.7 (43)	Essendon	14.9 (93)	Brunswick Street Oval	12 June 1920
Geelong	9.16 (70)	Carlton	11.13 (79)	Corio Oval	12 June 1920

=== Round 8 ===
Home team	Home team score	Away team	Away team score	Venue	Date
Richmond	19.15 (129)	St Kilda	8.6 (54)	Punt Road Oval	19 June 1920
South Melbourne	16.23 (119)	Geelong	5.16 (46)	Lake Oval	19 June 1920
Melbourne	6.10 (46)	Fitzroy	16.12 (108)	MCG	19 June 1920
Collingwood	12.13 (85)	Carlton	10.6 (66)	Victoria Park	19 June 1920

=== Round 9 ===
Home team	Home team score	Away team	Away team score	Venue	Date
Geelong	16.17 (113)	Melbourne	6.12 (48)	Corio Oval	26 June 1920
St Kilda	4.4 (28)	Fitzroy	14.18 (102)	Junction Oval	26 June 1920
Richmond	13.17 (95)	Essendon	11.9 (75)	Punt Road Oval	26 June 1920
South Melbourne	9.9 (63)	Collingwood	10.7 (67)	Lake Oval	26 June 1920

=== Round 10 ===
Home team	Home team score	Away team	Away team score	Venue	Date
South Melbourne	12.13 (85)	Melbourne	5.11 (41)	Lake Oval	3 July 1920
Richmond	8.12 (60)	Fitzroy	12.6 (78)	Punt Road Oval	3 July 1920
Essendon	8.7 (55)	Collingwood	9.8 (62)	EMCG	3 July 1920
St Kilda	8.9 (57)	Carlton	11.15 (81)	Junction Oval	3 July 1920

=== Round 11 ===
Home team	Home team score	Away team	Away team score	Venue	Date
Fitzroy	9.13 (67)	South Melbourne	8.14 (62)	Brunswick Street Oval	10 July 1920
Collingwood	11.17 (83)	Geelong	5.11 (41)	Victoria Park	10 July 1920
Carlton	8.11 (59)	Richmond	3.8 (26)	Princes Park	10 July 1920
Melbourne	5.13 (43)	Essendon	7.18 (60)	MCG	10 July 1920

=== Round 12 ===
Home team	Home team score	Away team	Away team score	Venue	Date
Geelong	16.17 (113)	St Kilda	9.8 (62)	Corio Oval	17 July 1920
South Melbourne	8.14 (62)	Essendon	7.7 (49)	Lake Oval	17 July 1920
Melbourne	8.11 (59)	Collingwood	10.15 (75)	MCG	17 July 1920
Fitzroy	11.9 (75)	Carlton	8.14 (62)	Brunswick Street Oval	17 July 1920

=== Round 13 ===
Home team	Home team score	Away team	Away team score	Venue	Date
Essendon	7.9 (51)	St Kilda	10.10 (70)	EMCG	31 July 1920
Collingwood	5.6 (36)	Richmond	5.8 (38)	Victoria Park	31 July 1920
Carlton	11.14 (80)	South Melbourne	7.11 (53)	Princes Park	31 July 1920
Geelong	4.9 (33)	Fitzroy	7.13 (55)	Corio Oval	31 July 1920

=== Round 14 ===
Home team	Home team score	Away team	Away team score	Venue	Date
Collingwood	7.15 (57)	Fitzroy	10.11 (71)	Victoria Park	7 August 1920
Carlton	13.11 (89)	Essendon	8.14 (62)	Princes Park	7 August 1920
St Kilda	3.3 (21)	Melbourne	11.17 (83)	Junction Oval	7 August 1920
Richmond	16.16 (112)	Geelong	5.14 (44)	Punt Road Oval	7 August 1920

=== Round 15 ===
Home team	Home team score	Away team	Away team score	Venue	Date
South Melbourne	9.7 (61)	Richmond	14.8 (92)	Lake Oval	14 August 1920
Geelong	14.10 (94)	Essendon	10.13 (73)	Corio Oval	14 August 1920
St Kilda	8.7 (55)	Collingwood	17.11 (113)	Junction Oval	14 August 1920
Melbourne	3.7 (25)	Carlton	12.15 (87)	MCG	14 August 1920

=== Round 16 ===
Home team	Home team score	Away team	Away team score	Venue	Date
Essendon	10.7 (67)	Fitzroy	12.11 (83)	EMCG	21 August 1920
Carlton	15.14 (104)	Geelong	6.5 (41)	Princes Park	21 August 1920
South Melbourne	11.17 (83)	St Kilda	3.14 (32)	Lake Oval	21 August 1920
Richmond	20.14 (134)	Melbourne	8.12 (60)	Punt Road Oval	21 August 1920

=== Round 17 ===
Home team	Home team score	Away team	Away team score	Venue	Date
Geelong	11.10 (76)	South Melbourne	8.25 (73)	Corio Oval	28 August 1920
Fitzroy	16.12 (108)	Melbourne	6.9 (45)	Brunswick Street Oval	28 August 1920
Carlton	16.13 (109)	Collingwood	7.15 (57)	Princes Park	28 August 1920
St Kilda	7.10 (52)	Richmond	12.15 (87)	Junction Oval	28 August 1920

=== Round 18 ===
Home team	Home team score	Away team	Away team score	Venue	Date
Fitzroy	22.17 (149)	St Kilda	11.3 (69)	Brunswick Street Oval	4 September 1920
Essendon	6.5 (41)	Richmond	15.14 (104)	EMCG	4 September 1920
Collingwood	16.12 (108)	South Melbourne	13.13 (91)	Victoria Park	4 September 1920
Melbourne	12.15 (87)	Geelong	17.14 (116)	MCG	4 September 1920

== Ladder ==
(P)	Premiers
	Qualified for finals

#	Team	P	W	L	D	PF	PA	%	Pts
1	Richmond (P)	16	14	2	0	1353	924	146.4	56
2	Fitzroy	16	14	2	0	1272	888	143.2	56
3	Carlton	16	10	6	0	1189	924	128.7	40
4	Collingwood	16	10	6	0	1085	966	112.3	40
5	South Melbourne	16	7	9	0	1099	1012	108.6	28
6	Essendon	16	5	11	0	1022	1164	87.8	20
7	Geelong	16	5	11	0	1098	1301	84.4	20
8	Melbourne	16	5	11	0	940	1266	74.2	20
9	St Kilda	16	2	14	0	819	1432	57.2	8

Rules for classification: 1. premiership points; 2. percentage; 3. points for
Average score: 68.6
Source: AFL Tables

== Finals series ==
All of the 1920 finals were played at the MCG so the home team in the semi-finals and preliminary final is purely the higher ranked team from the ladder but in the Grand Final the home team was the team that won the preliminary final.

=== Semi-finals ===
Home team	Score	Away team	Score	Venue	Date
Collingwood	4.17 (41)	Fitzroy	3.5 (23)	MCG	11 September
Carlton	7.11 (53)	Richmond	4.6 (30)	MCG	18 September

=== Preliminary final ===
Home team	Score	Away team	Score	Venue	Date
Collingwood	12.11 (83)	Carlton	8.11 (59)	MCG	25 September

== Season notes ==
- All Round 5 games were played on Wednesday, 26 May, to coincide with a visit by the Prince of Wales.
- After only three VFL games, Carlton's half-forward Horrie Clover was selected in the Victorian team that narrowly beat South Australia 10.11 (71) to 9.12 (66) in a match played at the Melbourne Cricket Ground in front of the Prince of Wales.
- Richmond's recruit from Kyabram, Billy James, aged 20, played his first senior game in the Grand Final, and kicked the final goal of the match (his only goal) in the last quarter. He badly injured his foot in a rabbit shooting accident before the start of the 1921 season, and never played again.
- At the end of the season, tired with the constant internal dissent at St Kilda, Roy Cazaly was granted a clearance to South Melbourne.
- Vic Cumberland, after four years away from football (he had been wounded three times in World War I), played 10 senior games for St Kilda in 1920, aged 43, making him the oldest player in VFL/AFL history.
- In Round 17, in the process of kicking 8.25 (73) in its 3-point loss to Geelong, South Melbourne hit the post nine times.
- Unable to tolerate the increasing levels of assaults, thrown projectiles, and ground invasions, umpires threatened to go on strike unless given stronger police protection.

== Awards ==
- The 1920 VFL Premiership team was Richmond.
- The VFL's leading goalkicker was George Bayliss of Richmond with 63 goals.
- St Kilda took the "wooden spoon" in 1920.
- The Victorian Junior League premiership, which is today recognised as the reserves premiership, was won by Collingwood District for the second straight year (see: 1920 VJFL season).

== Sources ==
- 1920 VFL season at AFL Tables
- 1920 VFL season at Australian Football
