= 1921 VFL season =

25th season of the Victorian Football League (VFL)

1921 VFL premiership season
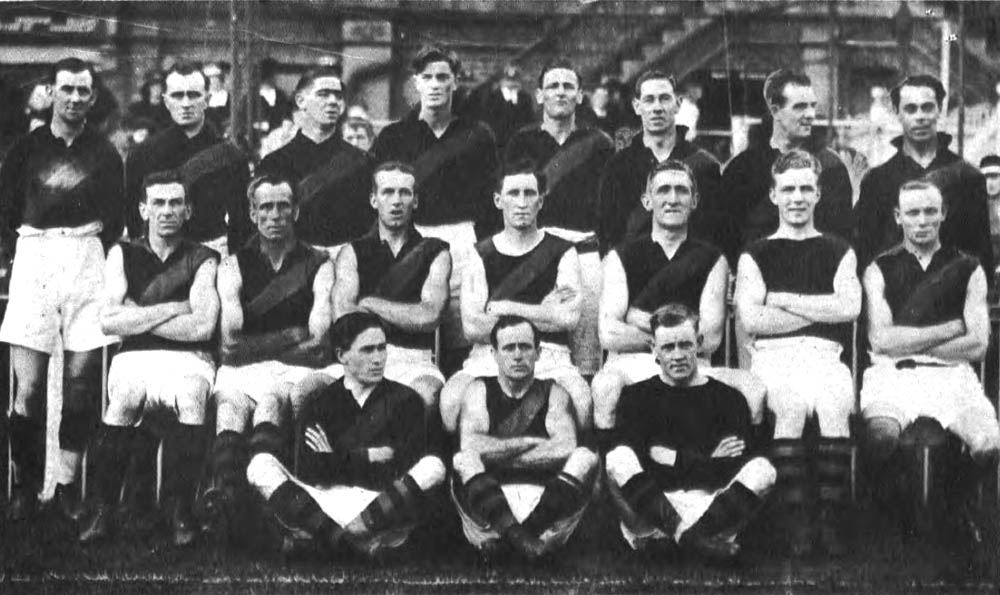
- Richmond 1921 VFL premiership team

Overview
- Date: 7 May – 15 October 1921
- Teams: 9
- Premiers: Richmond; 2nd premiership
- Runners-up: Carlton; 5th runners-up result
- Minor premiers: Carlton; 7th minor premiership
- Leading goalkicker medallist: Cliff Rankin (Geelong); 61 goals

Attendance
- Matches played: 76
- Total attendance: 1,340,858 (17,643 per match)
- Highest (H&A): 42,000 (round 10, Carlton v Richmond)
- Highest (finals): 43,122 (grand final, Carlton v Richmond)

The 1921 VFL season was the 25th season of the Victorian Football League (VFL), the highest-level senior Australian rules football competition in Victoria. The season featured nine clubs and ran from 7 May to 15 October, comprising a 16-match home-and-away season followed by a four-week finals series featuring the top four clubs.

Richmond won the premiership, defeating Carlton by four points in the 1921 VFL grand final; it was Richmond's second (consecutive and overall) VFL premiership. Carlton won the minor premiership by finishing atop the home-and-away ladder with a 13–1–2 win–loss–draw record. Geelong's Cliff Rankin won the leading goalkicker medal as the league's leading goalkicker.

== Background ==
In 1921, the VFL competition consisted of nine teams of 18 on-the-field players each, with no "reserves", although any of the 18 players who had left the playing field for any reason could later resume their place on the field at any time during the match.

Each team played each other twice in a home-and-away season of 18 rounds (i.e., 16 matches and 2 byes).

Once the 18 round home-and-away season had finished, the 1921 VFL Premiers were determined by the specific format and conventions of the amended "Argus system".

== Home-and-away season ==
=== Round 1 ===
Home team	Home team score	Away team	Away team score	Venue	Crowd	Date
St Kilda	10.6 (66)	South Melbourne	9.13 (67)	Junction Oval	15,000	7 May 1921
Essendon	11.12 (78)	Melbourne	12.6 (78)	EMCG	3,500	7 May 1921
Collingwood	10.13 (73)	Fitzroy	9.3 (57)	Victoria Park	20,000	7 May 1921
Richmond	7.11 (53)	Carlton	8.14 (62)	Punt Road Oval	32,000	7 May 1921

=== Round 2 ===
Home team	Home team score	Away team	Away team score	Venue	Crowd	Date
Fitzroy	7.11 (53)	St Kilda	8.15 (63)	Brunswick Street Oval	25,000	14 May 1921
South Melbourne	7.9 (51)	Richmond	11.16 (82)	Lake Oval	27,000	14 May 1921
Geelong	11.19 (85)	Essendon	10.16 (76)	Corio Oval	15,000	14 May 1921
Melbourne	7.11 (53)	Collingwood	14.13 (97)	MCG	14,994	14 May 1921

=== Round 3 ===
Home team	Home team score	Away team	Away team score	Venue	Crowd	Date
Fitzroy	5.6 (36)	Richmond	5.14 (44)	Brunswick Street Oval	18,000	21 May 1921
Collingwood	16.9 (105)	Geelong	13.9 (87)	Victoria Park	10,000	21 May 1921
Carlton	15.11 (101)	St Kilda	11.12 (78)	Princes Park	30,000	21 May 1921
South Melbourne	4.14 (38)	Essendon	11.15 (81)	Lake Oval	12,000	21 May 1921

=== Round 4 ===
Home team	Home team score	Away team	Away team score	Venue	Crowd	Date
Melbourne	10.10 (70)	South Melbourne	9.15 (69)	MCG	8,892	28 May 1921
Geelong	11.13 (79)	Richmond	9.8 (62)	Corio Oval	10,000	28 May 1921
Carlton	5.20 (50)	Fitzroy	6.14 (50)	Princes Park	28,000	28 May 1921
Essendon	7.12 (54)	Collingwood	9.17 (71)	EMCG	18,000	28 May 1921

=== Round 5 ===
Home team	Home team score	Away team	Away team score	Venue	Crowd	Date
Richmond	7.11 (53)	Collingwood	6.16 (52)	Punt Road Oval	30,000	4 June 1921
South Melbourne	10.10 (70)	Carlton	10.10 (70)	Lake Oval	25,000	4 June 1921
Fitzroy	8.14 (62)	Geelong	12.12 (84)	Brunswick Street Oval	35,000	6 June 1921
St Kilda	12.18 (90)	Melbourne	13.12 (90)	Junction Oval	20,000	6 June 1921

=== Round 6 ===
Home team	Home team score	Away team	Away team score	Venue	Crowd	Date
Geelong	11.13 (79)	St Kilda	5.5 (35)	Corio Oval	12,000	11 June 1921
Collingwood	9.13 (67)	South Melbourne	6.8 (44)	Victoria Park	20,000	11 June 1921
Richmond	14.11 (95)	Melbourne	13.14 (92)	Punt Road Oval	12,000	11 June 1921
Essendon	7.18 (60)	Carlton	18.9 (117)	EMCG	18,000	11 June 1921

=== Round 7 ===
Home team	Home team score	Away team	Away team score	Venue	Crowd	Date
Collingwood	17.12 (114)	St Kilda	9.10 (64)	Victoria Park	10,000	18 June 1921
Carlton	11.15 (81)	Geelong	8.13 (61)	Princes Park	40,000	18 June 1921
Melbourne	9.15 (69)	Fitzroy	4.17 (41)	MCG	11,214	18 June 1921
Richmond	12.14 (86)	Essendon	10.11 (71)	Punt Road Oval	12,000	18 June 1921

=== Round 8 ===
Home team	Home team score	Away team	Away team score	Venue	Crowd	Date
St Kilda	5.12 (42)	Richmond	13.11 (89)	Junction Oval	15,000	25 June 1921
South Melbourne	10.14 (74)	Geelong	8.5 (53)	Lake Oval	15,000	25 June 1921
Fitzroy	12.13 (85)	Essendon	6.10 (46)	Brunswick Street Oval	10,000	25 June 1921
Melbourne	7.13 (55)	Carlton	8.14 (62)	MCG	19,889	25 June 1921

=== Round 9 ===
Home team	Home team score	Away team	Away team score	Venue	Crowd	Date
Geelong	11.10 (76)	Melbourne	8.16 (64)	Corio Oval	9,000	2 July 1921
Essendon	5.12 (42)	St Kilda	11.17 (83)	EMCG	6,000	2 July 1921
Carlton	12.16 (88)	Collingwood	10.4 (64)	Princes Park	35,000	2 July 1921
South Melbourne	8.18 (66)	Fitzroy	6.12 (48)	Lake Oval	12,000	2 July 1921

=== Round 10 ===
Home team	Home team score	Away team	Away team score	Venue	Crowd	Date
Carlton	14.15 (99)	Richmond	6.12 (48)	Princes Park	42,000	9 July 1921
South Melbourne	13.9 (87)	St Kilda	11.8 (74)	Lake Oval	20,000	9 July 1921
Melbourne	7.12 (54)	Essendon	11.14 (80)	MCG	7,783	9 July 1921
Fitzroy	8.18 (66)	Collingwood	8.8 (56)	Brunswick Street Oval	12,000	9 July 1921

=== Round 11 ===
Home team	Home team score	Away team	Away team score	Venue	Crowd	Date
Richmond	9.12 (66)	South Melbourne	8.13 (61)	Punt Road Oval	15,000	16 July 1921
Essendon	2.15 (27)	Geelong	9.18 (72)	EMCG	6,000	16 July 1921
Collingwood	3.14 (32)	Melbourne	7.7 (49)	Victoria Park	4,500	16 July 1921
St Kilda	0.18 (18)	Fitzroy	6.8 (44)	Junction Oval	6,000	16 July 1921

=== Round 12 ===
Home team	Home team score	Away team	Away team score	Venue	Crowd	Date
Essendon	8.13 (61)	South Melbourne	5.13 (43)	EMCG	15,000	23 July 1921
Richmond	8.12 (60)	Fitzroy	14.13 (97)	Punt Road Oval	27,000	23 July 1921
Geelong	10.12 (72)	Collingwood	6.11 (47)	Corio Oval	14,000	23 July 1921
St Kilda	5.14 (44)	Carlton	22.10 (142)	Junction Oval	17,000	23 July 1921

=== Round 13 ===
Home team	Home team score	Away team	Away team score	Venue	Crowd	Date
Collingwood	10.11 (71)	Essendon	2.11 (23)	Victoria Park	4,000	30 July 1921
South Melbourne	8.21 (69)	Melbourne	7.11 (53)	Lake Oval	5,000	30 July 1921
Richmond	9.15 (69)	Geelong	5.6 (36)	Punt Road Oval	10,000	30 July 1921
Fitzroy	4.15 (39)	Carlton	3.6 (24)	Brunswick Street Oval	15,000	30 July 1921

=== Round 14 ===
Home team	Home team score	Away team	Away team score	Venue	Crowd	Date
Melbourne	6.20 (56)	St Kilda	5.19 (49)	MCG	6,488	20 August 1921
Collingwood	6.10 (46)	Richmond	10.12 (72)	Victoria Park	25,000	20 August 1921
Carlton	11.15 (81)	South Melbourne	7.14 (56)	Princes Park	25,000	20 August 1921
Geelong	13.8 (86)	Fitzroy	9.10 (64)	Corio Oval	16,000	20 August 1921

=== Round 15 ===
Home team	Home team score	Away team	Away team score	Venue	Crowd	Date
Melbourne	8.11 (59)	Richmond	12.6 (78)	MCG	13,832	27 August 1921
Carlton	7.19 (61)	Essendon	7.11 (53)	Princes Park	10,000	27 August 1921
St Kilda	11.16 (82)	Geelong	9.9 (63)	Junction Oval	9,000	27 August 1921
South Melbourne	5.10 (40)	Collingwood	8.7 (55)	Lake Oval	25,000	27 August 1921

=== Round 16 ===
Home team	Home team score	Away team	Away team score	Venue	Crowd	Date
Fitzroy	9.8 (62)	Melbourne	9.9 (63)	Brunswick Street Oval	8,000	3 September 1921
Essendon	5.15 (45)	Richmond	11.14 (80)	EMCG	14,000	3 September 1921
St Kilda	10.7 (67)	Collingwood	12.7 (79)	Junction Oval	16,000	3 September 1921
Geelong	6.11 (47)	Carlton	8.15 (63)	Corio Oval	24,000	3 September 1921

=== Round 17 ===
Home team	Home team score	Away team	Away team score	Venue	Crowd	Date
Richmond	14.11 (95)	St Kilda	7.5 (47)	Punt Road Oval	15,000	10 September 1921
Geelong	10.7 (67)	South Melbourne	3.10 (28)	Corio Oval	14,000	10 September 1921
Essendon	10.14 (74)	Fitzroy	11.8 (74)	EMCG	6,000	10 September 1921
Carlton	14.16 (100)	Melbourne	10.16 (76)	Princes Park	16,000	10 September 1921

=== Round 18 ===
Home team	Home team score	Away team	Away team score	Venue	Crowd	Date
Fitzroy	10.19 (79)	South Melbourne	6.9 (45)	Brunswick Street Oval	8,000	17 September 1921
Melbourne	16.19 (115)	Geelong	10.11 (71)	MCG	9,789	17 September 1921
St Kilda	14.12 (96)	Essendon	13.16 (94)	Junction Oval	10,000	17 September 1921
Collingwood	5.7 (37)	Carlton	9.10 (64)	Victoria Park	30,000	17 September 1921

== Ladder ==
(P)	Premiers
	Qualified for finals

#	Team	P	W	L	D	PF	PA	%	Pts
1	Carlton	16	13	1	2	1265	891	142.0	56
2	Richmond (P)	16	12	4	0	1132	975	116.1	48
3	Collingwood	16	9	7	0	1066	953	111.9	36
4	Geelong	16	9	7	0	1118	1054	106.1	36
5	Fitzroy	16	6	8	2	957	921	103.9	28
6	Melbourne	16	6	8	2	1096	1149	95.4	28
7	South Melbourne	16	5	10	1	908	1073	84.6	22
8	St Kilda	16	4	11	1	998	1295	77.1	18
9	Essendon	16	3	11	2	965	1194	80.8	16

Rules for classification: 1. premiership points; 2. percentage; 3. points for
Average score: 66.0
Source: AFL Tables

== Finals series ==
All of the 1921 finals were played at the MCG so the home team in the semi-finals and preliminary final is purely the higher ranked team from the ladder but in the grand final the home team was the team that won the preliminary final.

=== Semi-finals ===
Home team	Score	Away team	Score	Venue	Crowd	Date
Richmond	16.19 (115)	Geelong	6.18 (54)	MCG	41,649	24 September
Carlton	9.11 (65)	Collingwood	7.10 (52)	MCG	37,813	1 October

=== Preliminary final ===
Home team	Score	Away team	Score	Venue	Crowd	Date
Richmond	10.7 (67)	Carlton	7.17 (59)	MCG	42,866	8 October

== Season notes ==
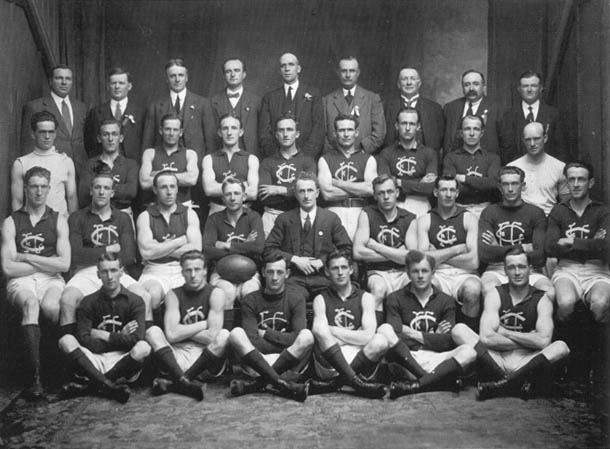
Carlton, the minor premier of the season

- Umpires demand that the VFL provides greater protection, including the wire netting of the umpire's race to the ground (in order to protect them from fists, projectiles and, particularly, ladies' hat-pins) and a stronger police guard.
- In the last quarter of the Round 7 match between Richmond and Essendon at the Punt Road Oval, Richmond had kicked a point. The ball was returned from the crowd to the Essendon full-back Bert Day who was on the boundary line, not the goal line. The ball had been stabbed by someone in the crowd. Day, noticing the deflated condition of the ball, kicked it idly from the boundary line over to the field Umpire (E. P. Williamson) to inspect. Richmond full-forward George Bayliss pounced on the ball and kicked a goal with it. Day's kick from the boundary line was mistakenly treated as if it had been a kick out from the goal line and, despite all of Essendon's protests, a goal was awarded to Bayliss.
- In Round 10 Charlie Hardy Debuted for Essendon Football Club at the age of 34 years 100 days old making him the oldest debutant in VFL/AFL History.
- In Round 11, St Kilda failed to score a goal, and lost badly to a Fitzroy team that had four fewer scoring shots: Fitzroy 6.8 (44) to St Kilda 0.18 (18).
- Prior to the Round 12 match between St Kilda and Carlton, a "ladies" football match was played between two female teams, "The Chorleys" and "The Fleetwoods", to the delight of the crowd. The Fleetwoods won 4.2 (26) to 2.4 (16). Whilst the women played in men's guernseys, shorts, socks, boots, etc. the (male) field umpire wore a dress.
- The fourth Australian Football Carnival was held in Perth. Western Australia were the Australian Champions.
- In Round 17, Essendon played its last match at the East Melbourne Cricket Ground, before the ground was closed to make way for an expansion of the Flinders Street railyards. During the season, the club made arrangements to find a new home base for 1922, initially looking to move to the North Melbourne Recreation Reserve, and finally settling on the Essendon Recreation Reserve when a move to North Melbourne was blocked.
- The Preliminary Final on 8 October, played between Richmond and Carlton, was played in deep mud, and the second half was delayed until a driving hail-storm, that had turned the Melbourne Cricket Ground's playing surface white, had passed. The second half was played with the surface covered with pools of water six inches deep. (The VFA preliminary final, played at the nearby East Melbourne Cricket Ground, was abandoned in the third quarter and replayed the following week due to the same hail-storm). Despite being behind at half-time, Carlton led by 2 points at three-quarter time, but then in a unique move, Richmond brought every big man on the ball and they claimed the victory.
- The five drawn matches during the 1921 season remains a VFL/AFL record for most draws in one season.

== Awards ==
- The 1921 VFL Premiership team was Richmond.
- The VFL's leading goalkicker was Cliff Rankin of Geelong with 61 goals.
- Essendon took the "wooden spoon" in 1921.
- The Victorian Junior League premiership, which is today recognised as the VFL reserves premiership, was won by Essendon Juniors (main: 1921 VJFL season).

== Sources ==
- 1921 VFL season at AFL Tables
- 1921 VFL season at Australian Football
