= Bill Walton (footballer) =

Australian rules footballer (1894–1953)

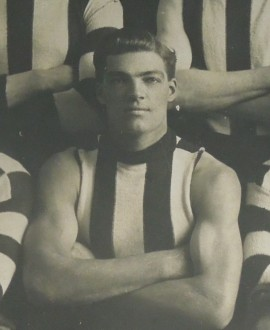
- Walton in 1919

Personal information
- Full name: William Henry Walton
- Nickname: Chinga
- Born: 3 September 1894; Abbotsford, Victoria
- Died: 24 July 1953 (aged 58); St. Kilda
- Original team: Port Melbourne
- Height: 178 cm (5 ft 10 in)
- Weight: 82 kg (181 lb)
- Position: Forward

Playing career^{1}
Years	Club	Games (Goals)
1918–1919	Collingwood	27 (17)
- ^{1} Playing statistics correct to the end of 1919.

William Henry Walton (3 September 1894 – 24 July 1953) was an Australian rules footballer who played with Collingwood in the Victorian Football League (VFL).

== Family ==
William Henry Waghorne was born at Collingwood on 3 September 1894 to Winifred Waghorne. Winifred later married William Daniel Walton (1853-1930) and William Henry used the Walton surname during his football career.

William married Eleanor May Moody (1895-1972) on 30 December 1914 at the Holy Trinity Church in Port Melbourne. They had two children together, James George Waghorne (born 1916) and Nellie Winifred Waghorne (born 1918). They subsequently divorced in 1935.

== Football ==
Walton started his career at Victorian Football Association (VFA) club Port Melbourne and was their leading goal-kicker in 1914. When the VFA went into recess due to WWI, Walton agreed to captain South Melbourne District in the VJFA for 1916. Enticed to join Collingwood in 1918, Walton appeared in Grand Finals in both his seasons with Collingwood. He played centre half forward in the 1918 VFL Grand Final loss to South Melbourne and centre half back in the 1919 premiership team.

Walton returned to Port Melbourne in 1920 and was appointed captain-coach of Hawthorn (then playing in the VFA) in 1922. He was however refused a clearance by Port Melbourne and as a result spent the season playing for them, while coaching Hawthorn during the week. Twice that season, he had the unusual situation of playing a VFA game against the club that he coached. In one of those matches a Port Melbourne teammate had to be restrained from striking Walton over Walton's vocal support for the player's opponent. In 1923 he was granted his clearance and steered Hawthorn into the finals.

In 1925 he accepted a position to captain-coach Stawell in the Wimmera District Football League. He led the team to a premiership but left town the following year.

Walton then became the captain-coach of the Castlemaine Football Club for 3 years, from 1926 to 1928, leading them to a Bendigo Football League premiership in 1926, and runner up in 1927.

Walton then moved to Albury as captain-coach of East Albury in 1929 in the Ovens and Murray Football League. East Albury were runners up in 1929.

== Hotel licensee ==
In 1930 he retired as a player and took up being the licensee for the Rising Sun Hotel in South Melbourne. Later on he was the licensee of the Sir Henry Loch Hotel in Collingwood.

== Death ==
He died at his St Kilda residence after a short illness on 24 July 1953.

== Sources ==
- Atkinson, G. (1982) Everything you ever wanted to know about Australian rules football but couldn't be bothered asking, The Five Mile Press: Melbourne. ISBN 0 86788 009 0.
- Holmesby, Russell and Main, Jim (2007). The Encyclopedia of AFL Footballers. 7th ed. Melbourne: Bas Publishing.
