= Bert Colechin =

Australian rules footballer

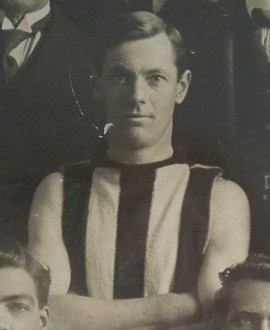
- Colechin in 1919

Personal information
- Full name: Albert Burton Colechin
- Born: 19 June 1887; Collingwood, Victoria
- Died: 25 August 1947 (aged 60); Tremont, Victoria
- Original team: Prahran
- Height: 178 cm (5 ft 10 in)
- Weight: 73 kg (161 lb)

Playing career^{1}
Years	Club	Games (Goals)
1916–1921	Collingwood	57 (2)
- ^{1} Playing statistics correct to the end of 1921.

Albert Burton Colechin (19 June 1887 – 25 August 1947) was an Australian rules footballer who played with Collingwood in the Victorian Football League (VFL).

Colechin was just a week shy of his 29th birthday when he made his Collingwood debut in the 1916 VFL season. He had previously played with the Fitzroy Juniors and Prahran.

He was a half back flank in Collingwood's 1919 premiership team. He also appeared in their 1918 and 1920 grand final losses, as a half back flanker and back pocket respectively.

In 1921 he represented the VFL in an interstate fixture against South Australia.
