= Mal Seddon =

Australian rules footballer

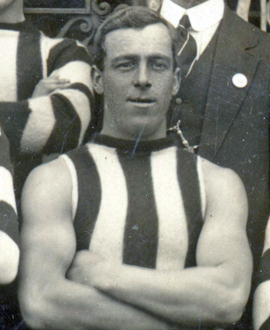
- Seddon in 1914

Personal information
- Full name: Malcolm Seddon
- Born: 31 May 1888; Collingwood, Victoria
- Died: 30 August 1955 (aged 67); Abbotsford, Victoria
- Original team: Collingwood District
- Debut: 18 July 1911, Collingwood vs. Geelong, at Corio Oval
- Height: 182 cm (6 ft 0 in)
- Weight: 81 kg (179 lb)

Playing career^{1}
Years	Club	Games (Goals)
1911–15, 1919–21	Collingwood	102 (56)
- ^{1} Playing statistics correct to the end of 1921.

Career highlights
- 1919 Premiership Team

Malcolm "Doc" Seddon (31 May 1888 – 30 August 1955) was an Australian rules footballer who played with Collingwood in the Victorian Football League (VFL).

Seddon was also a veteran of World War I, where he fought in Europe and spent time in the Middle East from 1915 to 1919. Seddon survived the war and returned to play for Collingwood in 1919.

Controversially, Seddon's drill sergeant, a supporter of rival VFL club Carlton, put Seddon and Collingwood teammate Paddy Rowan through a 10-mile route march on the morning of the 1915 Grand Final.

Whilst overseas, Seddon sent back a horseshoe made from a German bomb along with the remnants of a German aircraft shot down by Australian soldiers at the Battle of the Somme. Seddon sent them to the club as a gesture of good luck. In Seddon's absence, Collingwood won the 1917 Premiership.

Items sent back from Seddon during the war can be seen on display at Collingwood's Holden Centre in Melbourne.

In Seddon's first season back after the war, he was a part of the 1919 Collingwood premiership team that defeated Richmond.
