= Wally Haysom =

Australian rules footballer

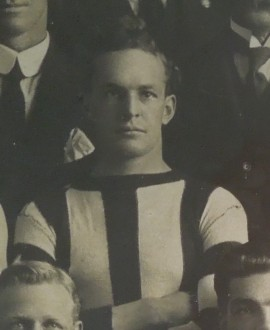
- Haysom in 1919

Personal information
- Full name: Wally Haysom
- Born: 17 December 1897
- Died: 1 November 1982 (aged 84)
- Original team: Prahran
- Height: 173 cm (5 ft 8 in)
- Weight: 73 kg (161 lb)
- Position: Back pocket

Playing career^{1}
Years	Club	Games (Goals)
1919–1920	Collingwood	23 (1)
- ^{1} Playing statistics correct to the end of 1920.

Wally Haysom (17 December 1897 – 1 November 1982) was an Australian rules footballer who played with Collingwood in the Victorian Football League (VFL).

Haysom was a back pocket defender in Collingwood's 1919 premiership team, one of 16 appearances he made that season. He played another seven games in 1920.

Haysom was the last survivor of the Collingwood 1919 premiership team.
