= Charlie Curtis (Australian footballer) =

Australian rules footballer

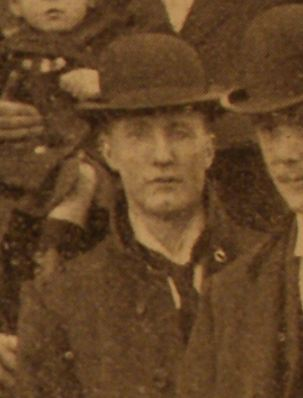
- Curtis in 1899

Personal information
- Full name: Charles Ernest Curtis
- Born: 17 December 1878; Carlton, Victoria
- Died: 8 May 1959 (aged 80); St Vincent's Hospital; Fitzroy, Victoria
- Height: 170 cm (5 ft 7 in)
- Weight: 68 kg (150 lb)
- Position: rover

Playing career^{1}
Years	Club	Games (Goals)
1896	Carlton (VFA)	3 (0)
1898–1900	Carlton (VFL)	21 (2)
1901	Richmond (VFA)	14 (0)
Total		38 (2)
- ^{1} Playing statistics correct to the end of 1901.

Charlie Curtis (17 December 1878 – 8 May 1959) was an Australian rules footballer who played with Carlton in the Victorian Football League (VFL).

== Family ==
The son of John Richard Curtis, J.P. (1853-1945), and Elizabeth Curtis (1855-1931), née Harry, Charles Ernest Curtis was born at Carlton, Victoria on 17 December 1878.

One of his brothers, Harry Richard Curtis (1892-1968), played VFL football for both Carlton and Collingwood.

He married Alice Louisa Atkinson (1882-1906) in 1904. He married Maud May Ratcliff (1887-1948) in 1911.

== Death ==
He died at St Vincent's Hospital in Fitzroy, Victoria on 8 May 1959.
