= Tom Drummond (footballer) =

Australian rules footballer

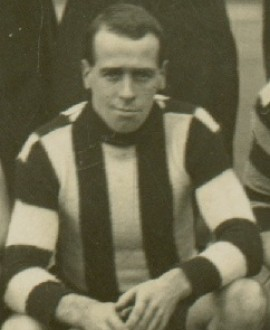

Personal information
- Full name: Thomas Taylor Drummond
- Born: 6 August 1897; Collingwood, Victoria
- Died: 26 May 1970 (aged 72); Fairfield, Victoria
- Original team: Collingwood District
- Debut: Round 5, 1916, Collingwood vs. Carlton, at Princes Park
- Height: 170 cm (5 ft 7 in)
- Weight: 68 kg (150 lb)

Playing career^{1}
Years	Club	Games (Goals)
1916–1922	Collingwood	94 (6)
1926	South Melbourne	5 (1)
Total		99 (7)
- ^{1} Playing statistics correct to the end of 1926.

Thomas "Chick" Taylor Drummond (6 August 1897 – 26 May 1970) was an Australian rules footballer who played with Collingwood and South Melbourne in the Victorian Football League (VFL).

Drummond was a member of Collingwood premiership teams in 1917 and 1919 and their runner up team in 1920.

He represented Victoria at interstate football in 1921 at the Western Australian Football Carnival and again in 1922 against South Australia at the Melbourne Cricket Ground.

A wingman, he captained Collingwood in the 1922 VFL season and led the club to the 1922 VFL Grand Final which they lost by 11 points to Fitzroy Football Club.

Drummond was initially appointed as coach of the Williamstown Football Club in March, 1923, but owing to a delay in the permit being granted, Charlie Laxton was appointed instead.

Drummond was then appointed as coach of Benalla Football Club in late March 1923.

In March 1924, it was reported that Drummond would be coaching the Murtoa Football Club in the Wimmera Football League. Concerned Benalla officials were able to intercept Drummond at the Benalla Railway Station on his way back from Queensland and told him he would not be cleared to Murtoa. Drummond then committed to coaching Benalla again in 1924 in the Ovens and Murray Football League. Benalla finished 6th on the O&MFL ladder in 1924 under Drummond.

Drummond then coached the St. Patrick's Football Club, Albury, NSW in the Ovens and Murray Football League in 1925.

Drummond returned to VFL football in 1926 with the South Melbourne Football Club.

In March 1927, Drummond was cleared to the Rushworth Football Club and coached them in the Goulburn Valley Football League.

In early 1928, Drummond trained with the West Adelaide Football Club.

Drummond later captain-coached Benalla again to the 1932 Euroa & District Football Association premiership.
