= Artie Bettles =

Australian rules footballer

Personal information
- Full name: Arthur James Bettles
- Born: 25 March 1891; Bright, Victoria
- Died: 10 July 1971 (aged 80); Thornbury, Victoria
- Original team: South Melbourne Districts
- Height: 178 cm (5 ft 10 in)
- Weight: 75 kg (165 lb)

Playing career^{1}
Years	Club	Games (Goals)
1914–1920	Richmond	74 (0)
- ^{1} Playing statistics correct to the end of 1920.

Arthur James Bettles (25 March 1891 – 10 July 1971) was an Australian rules footballer who played in the Victorian Football League (VFL) between 1914 and 1920 for the Richmond Football Club.
