= Con McCarthy =

Australian rules footballer (1893–1975)

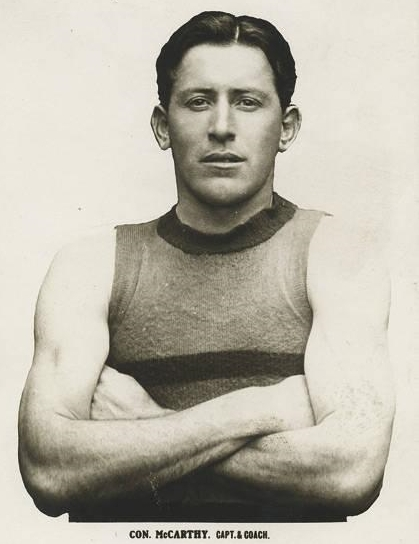

Personal information
- Full name: John Cornelius McCarthy
- Born: 10 February 1893; Collingwood, Victoria
- Died: 19 June 1975 (aged 82); St Kilda East, Victoria
- Original team: Fairfield
- Height: 180 cm (5 ft 11 in)
- Weight: 89 kg (196 lb)

Playing career^{1}
Years	Club	Games (Goals)
1915–1921	Collingwood	101 (22)
1922–1924	Footscray (VFA)	62 (51)
1925–1926	Footscray	30 (17)
Total		193 (90)

Coaching career^{3}
Years	Club	Games (W–L–D)
1925	Footscray	17 (4–13–0)
- ^{1} Playing statistics correct to the end of 1926.^{3} Coaching statistics correct as of 1925.

Career highlights
- Collingwood premiership player 1917; Collingwood premiership captain 1919; Collingwood captain 1919; Footscray captains 1922–1926

John Cornelius "Con" McCarthy (10 February 1893 – 19 June 1975) was an Australian rules footballer who played with Collingwood and Footscray in the VFL. He was known during his career as Con McCarthy.

== Family ==
The third of the five children of Cornelius John McCarthy (1866-1946), and Sarah Amelia McCarthy (1873-1945), née Cruell, John Cornelius McCarthy was born at Collingwood, Victoria on 10 February 1893. He married Martha Violet Miller (1895-1976) in 1918.

== Football ==
Originally from Western Australia, McCarthy was a ruckman and started his league career in 1915 with Collingwood. He was a premiership player with them in 1917 and 1919, the latter as captain. He also captained Victoria during his career, leading the VFL to victory at the 1921 Perth Carnival.

In 1922, McCarthy joined Footscray in the VFA in 1922 as captain-coach on a lucrative deal, which saw him earn £10 per week, compared with the £2/10/– per week he had earned at Collingwood. Footscray at the time was a rich and ambitious club attempting to gain admission to the VFL, and it made several aggressive recruiting plays like this to further its case; the Sporting Globe commented that McCarthy was the first "big money" player in the game.

As captain-coach, McCarthy led Footscray to back-to-back VFA premierships in 1923 and 1924. McCarthy won the VFA best and fairest award, the Woodham Cup in 1923.

When Footscray was admitted to the VFL in 1925, McCarthy was their inaugural captain and coach; he continued as captain in 1926, before retiring at the end of the 1926 season.

== See also ==
- 1921 Perth Carnival
- 1924 Championship of Victoria
