= Les Hughes =

Australian rules footballer

Les "Flapper" Hughes
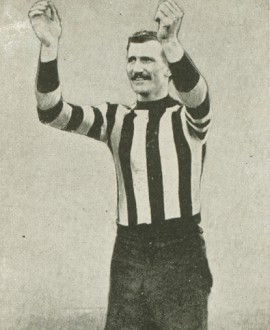
- Hughes in 1910

Personal information
- Full name: Leslie Horace Hughes
- Nicknames: Flapper, Lofty
- Born: 18 April 1884; Northcote, Victoria
- Died: 27 September 1962 (aged 78); Parkville, Victoria
- Original team: Collingwood Trades
- Height: 188 cm (6 ft 2 in)
- Weight: 93 kg (205 lb)
- Position: Ruck/Forward

Playing career^{1}
Years	Club	Games (Goals)
1908–1922	Collingwood	225 (175)
- ^{1} Playing statistics correct to the end of 1922.

Career highlights
- VFL/AFL: Australian Football League Life Member; Collingwood: 3x VFL premiership player: 1910, 1917, 1919; 2× Gordon Coventry Trophy - Leading Goal Kicker: 1912, 1913; Collingwood Football Club Most Consistent Player: 1912; Collingwood Football Club Life Member: 1919; Collingwood Football Club Hall of Fame: 2009; Representative: Victorian (VFL) Captain: 1919

Leslie Horace "Flapper" Hughes (18 April 1884 – 27 September 1962) was an Australian rules footballer who played for Collingwood in the Victorian Football League (VFL).

Hughes is said to be Melbourne's first AFL/VFL football celebrity publican (TBC). In 1927, Hughes was the owner and Licensee of the Royal Derby Hotel in Fitzroy. He rebranded the hotel as the 'Les Hughes Royal Derby Hotel' whilst he was the publican. Following his time at the Royal Derby, Hughes was later the Publican at the Aberdeen Hotel in Fitzroy North, and the Gasometer Hotel in Collingwood.
