= Hugh James (footballer) =

Australian rules footballer (1890–1967)

Personal information
- Full name: John Hugh James
- Born: 4 May 1890; Sale, Victoria
- Died: 23 April 1967 (aged 77); Wellington, New Zealand
- Original team: Preston (VFA)
- Height: 185 cm (6 ft 1 in)
- Weight: 89 kg (196 lb)

Playing career^{1}
Years	Club	Games (Goals)
1907	Preston (VFA)	11 (0)
1908	Essendon (VFA)	2 (0)
1909–1916	Richmond (VFL)	114 (51)
1919–1923	Richmond (VFL)	74 (68)
Total		201 (119)
- ^{1} Playing statistics correct to the end of 1923.

Career highlights
- AIF Pioneer Exhibition Game, London, 28 October 1916; Richmond Premiership Player 1920, 1921; Interstate Games: 1912, 1913, 1914, 1920; Richmond – Hall of Fame – inducted 2005

John Hugh James MC & Bar (4 May 1890 – 23 April 1967) was an Australian rules footballer who served overseas in the First AIF, who played in the 1916 Pioneer Exhibition Game, and played with the Preston and the Essendon in the Victorian Football Association (VFA), and with Richmond in the Victorian Football League (VFL).

== Family ==
The eldest son of Margaret Rankin James (1865–1947), née Gracie, John Hugh James was born at Sale, Victoria on 4 May 1890.

He married Ethel May Condron (b.1890) in Maribyrnong, Victoria on 11 November 1913. They had three children, Sylvia (1915-2008), Marjorie (b.1920), and Laurie (b.1923).

== Football ==
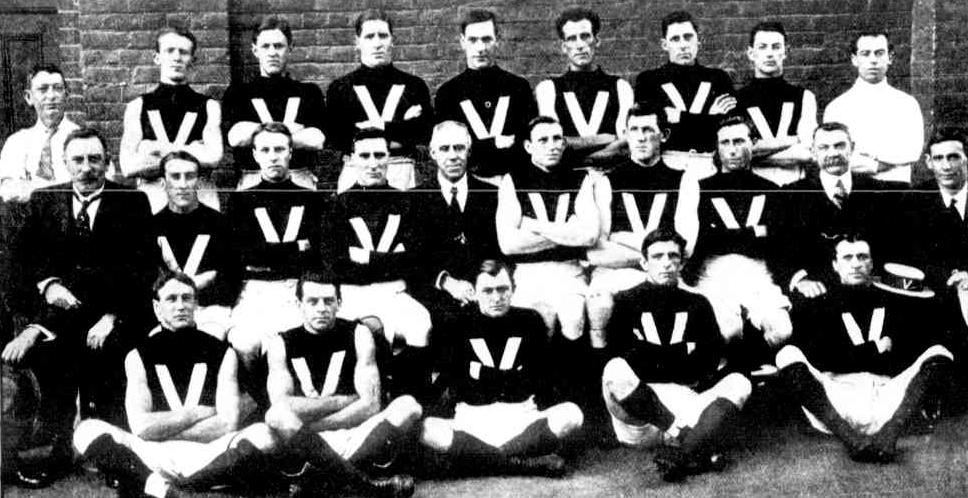
Victorian Team: 1914 ANFC Carnival. James is third player from right, back row.

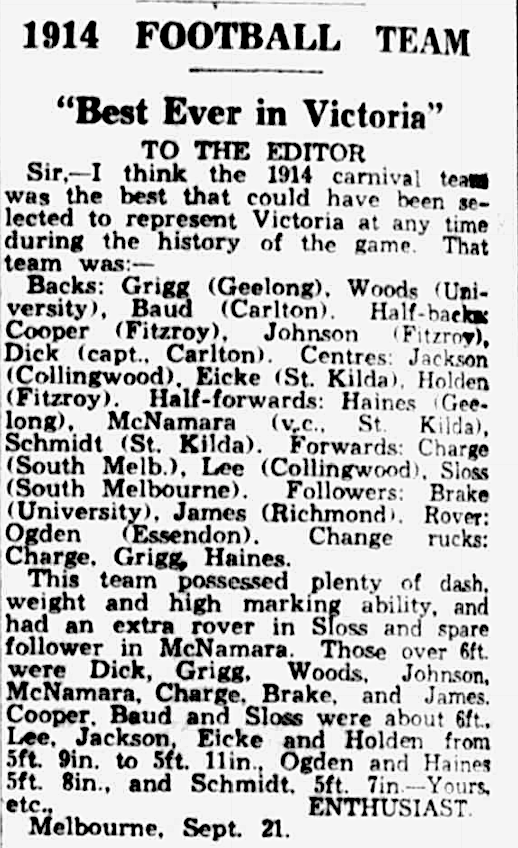
Enthusiast's Letter to the Editor The Herald, 21 Sept. 1934.

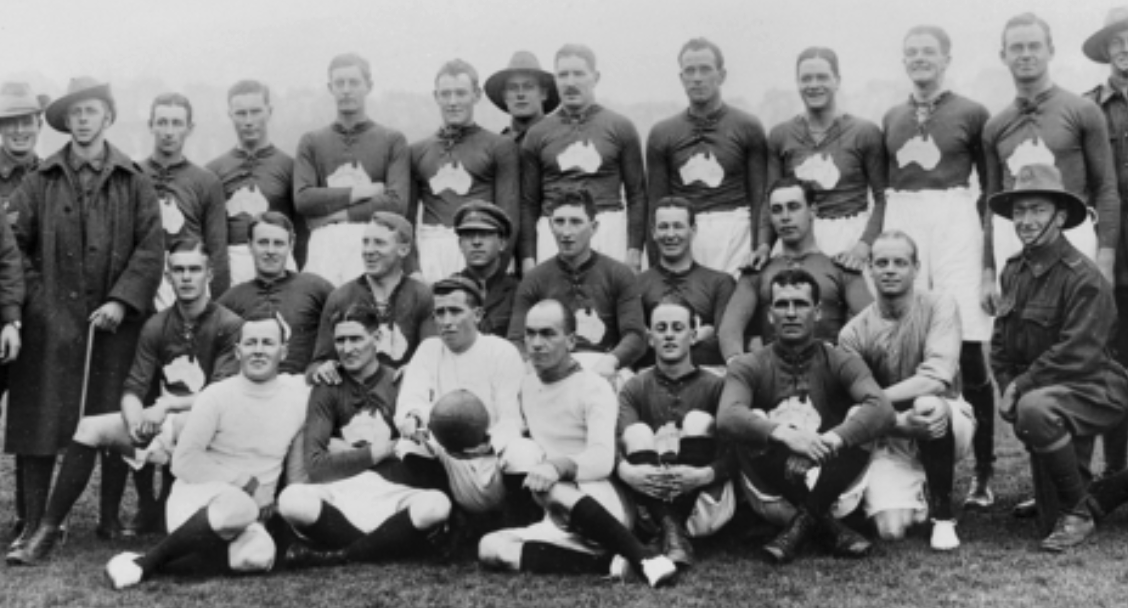
The Third Australian Divisional Team: 28 October 1916. James is fourth player from right, back row.

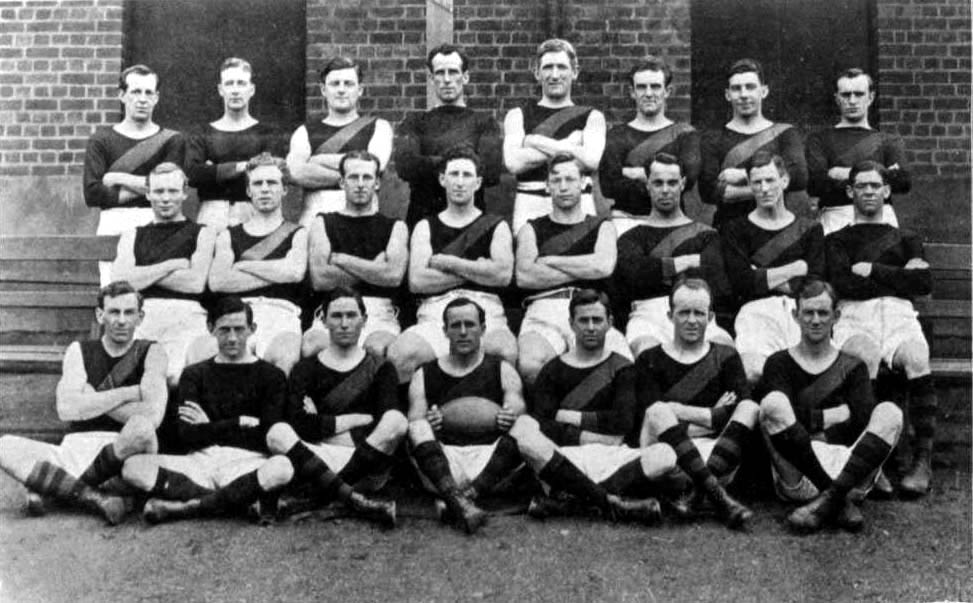
1920 Richmond Premiership Team. James is fourth player from left, back row.

"A champion ruckman during Richmond’s formative years in the VFL[, Hughie James] was a strongly-built man who was courageous, skilful, and very fair. He was fine team man who partnered Bernie Herbert in what was a very formidable rucking combination. He was also a very adept palmer of the ball and never became flustered during a tense situation."

=== Preston (VFA) ===
He played in 11 games with the Preston Football Club in the Victorian Football Association (VFA) in 1907. He made his debut, against Richmond, in the first round of the 1907 season.

=== Essendon (VFA) ===
Playing the season with the "Junior" club, Maribyrnong, he played in two matches for the Essendon Association Football Club in the VFA in 1908: against North Melbourne on 8 June 1908, and against Northcote on 13 June 1908.

=== Richmond (VFL) ===
He was cleared from Essendon (Association) to Richmond on 14 April 1909. He made his debut for Richmond, against St Kilda, at the Junction Oval, on 29 May 1909.

=== Third Divisional team (AIF) ===
He played for the (winning) Third Australian Divisional team in the famous "Pioneer Exhibition Game" of Australian Rules football, held in London, in October 1916. A news film was taken at the match.

=== Richmond (VFL) ===
Having returned to Melbourne from his war service a week earlier, he played his first game with Richmond, against Melbourne, at the Punt Road Oval, on 26 July 1919. He played in 74 games (68 goals) from 1919 to 1923, including the 1919 VFL Grand Final loss to Collingwood, the 1920 VFL Grand Final victory over Collingwood, and the 1921 VFL Grand Final victory over Carlton.

== Military service ==
League Footballer Enlists
A notable recruit entered the room [at the Melbourne Town Hall Depot] during the evening [of 28 January 1916] in an unassuming manner peculiar to himself. He was Hugh James, for many years a burly and indefatigable follower with the Richmond football team in League premiership competitions. He gave his age as 25 and stated that he was a married man with one child. They were going to turn me down he said when questioned, "and said my eyesight was not good; but it seems that they mixed me up with another chap. Anyhow, I objected and told them that I would submit to a test on the other side of the street. The doctor was very nice when he found out how matters were. It was all over in a moment or two. I thought it was up to me to do my share. You see I'm young and in good condition. And--who knows?--I might be on the ball again in a season or two." So be it. A great many admirers of this popular player will devoutly hope so, at any rate. — The Argus, 28 January 1916.

He served in the First AIF from 1916 to 1919. Rising to the rank of Lieutenant, he was twice wounded on active duty in France, and was twice awarded the Military Cross for bravery in the battlefield, "making him the most decorated senior footballer of the Great War".

=== Military Cross ===
In December 1917 he was awarded a Military Cross:

2nd Lieutenant John Hugh James, Infantry.
For conspicuous gallantry and devotion to duty in reconnoitring and repairing a road and constructing a bridge over a river under heavy shell fire. His gallantry under the most trying circumstances was a fine example, and inspired his men with the greatest confidence.

The original recommendation for the award read as follows:

2nd Lieut. John Hugh JAMES.,
3rd Aust. Pioneer Battalion.
On the 7th and 8th June 1917, at MESSINES ROAD he reconnoitred and repaired this road, and constructed a bridge over the river DOUVE under heavy shell fire. His devotion to duty under the most trying circumstances, was a fine example, and inspired his men with confidence.

=== Bar to Military Cross ===
In May 1919 he was awarded a Bar to his Military Cross:

Lieutenant John Hugh James., M.C., 3rd Pioneer Battalion.
For conspicuous gallantry and devotion to duty. This officer led his platoon against a strongly defended line, suffering heavy casualties from machine-gun fire, but he reached his objective and captured thirty prisoners. He superintended and encouraged the men in the consolidation of the position, exposed to constant machine-gun and rifle fire. His determination contributed largely to the success of the operation.

The original recommendation for the award, dated 5 September 1918, by Lieutenant Colonel William Henry Sanday, read as follows:

On the 22nd. August, 1918, during the attack West of BRAY, Lieut. JAMES led his platoon with great gallantry and skill. Although the enemy line was strongly held by machine-guns which caused many casualties among his men, he succeeded in reaching his objective and capturing 30 prisoners.
Throughout the consolidation his men were subject to heavy machine-gun and rifle fire, and it was only by his courage, cheerful disposition and total disregard of danger that the consolidation was successful.
His fine example, great gallantry and devotion to duty was an inspiration to all ranks and contributed largely to the success of the operation.

=== Return to Australia ===
He returned to Australia on the troopship Rio Pardo, arriving in Adelaide on 17 July 1919, and in Melbourne (via interstate rail at Spencer Street Railway Station) on 18 July 1919.

== Death ==
He died in Wellington, New Zealand, on 23 April 1967.

== See also ==
- 1914 Sydney Carnival
- 1916 Pioneer Exhibition Game
