= Frank Hughes (footballer, born 1894) =

Australian rules footballer and coach

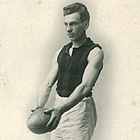

Personal information
- Full name: Francis Vane Hughes
- Nickname: Checker
- Born: 26 February 1894; Myrtleford, Victoria
- Died: 23 January 1978 (aged 83); East Melbourne, Victoria
- Original team: Burnley
- Height: 175 cm (5 ft 9 in)
- Weight: 70 kg (154 lb)

Playing career^{1}
Years	Club	Games (Goals)
1914–1923	Richmond	87 (51)

Coaching career^{3}
Years	Club	Games (W–L–D)
1927–1932	Richmond	120 (87–31–2)
1933–1941	Melbourne	173 (108–64–1)
1945–1948	Melbourne	84 (49–34–1)
1965	Melbourne	1 (0–1–0)
Total		378 (244–130–4)
- ^{1} Playing statistics correct to the end of 1923.^{3} Coaching statistics correct as of 1965.

Career highlights
- Club: 2× VFL premiership player: 1920, 1921; 5× VFL premiership coach: 1932, 1939, 1940, 1941, 1948; Australian Football Hall of Fame; Melbourne Hall of Fame; Richmond Hall of Fame

Francis Vane Hughes (26 February 1894 – 23 January 1978), nicknamed Checker, was an Australian rules footballer and coach in the Victorian Football League (now the Australian Football League). He coached Richmond to premiership success once and the Melbourne Football Club to premiership success four times, and he was responsible for the club changing its nickname to the Demons. He also had a war-interrupted playing career that resulted in two premierships.

Hughes served in the 57th battalion of the Australian Imperial Force during World War I, was made a company quartermaster sergeant, and was awarded a Meritorious Service Medal in recognition of his significant contribution in France and Belgium. In 2021, the AFL honoured Hughes' combined merits as a soldier, football player, and football coach by having the Frank ‘Checker’ Hughes medal named in his honour for the player judged best afield in the Anzac Day Eve match between Melbourne and Richmond.

== Playing career ==
A small and quick player with brilliant skills in stab passing and handball, Hughes played in two Richmond Football Club premiership sides (1920, 1921) during his 87-game career, although his playing career was stalled for 3½ years due to his war service.

== Coaching career ==
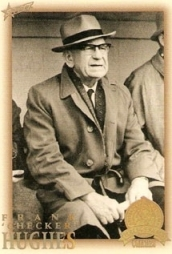

Hughes coached over an extended period with a great deal of success, securing 5 VFL premierships. When his friend and former Richmond secretary Percy Page went to the Melbourne Football Club, Hughes followed him. He renamed the "Fuchsias" to Demons, sacked 13 players, and instilled discipline in the club.

- Ulverstone (Tasmania) 1924–1926
- Richmond 1927–1932 (120 games, 87 wins, 31 losses, 2 draws)
- Melbourne 1933–1941, 1945–1948, 1965 (254 games, 157 wins, 95 losses, 2 draws)
  - 5 Premierships: 1932 (Richmond); 1939, 1940, 1941, 1948 (Melbourne).

Hughes was inducted to the Australian Football Hall of Fame in 1996, with his citation reading:

Took Richmond to premiership success in 1932 then went to Melbourne and landed another four flags. A tough and disciplined coach.

== Sources ==
- Ross, John (1999). The Australian Football Hall of Fame. Australia: HarperCollinsPublishers. p. 79. ISBN 0-7322-6426-X.
- Hogan P: The Tigers Of Old, Richmond FC, Melbourne 1996
