= Billy James (Australian footballer) =

Australian rules footballer, born 1900

William James

Personal information
- Full name: William Roy James
- Born: 10 May 1900; Fryerstown, Victoria
- Died: 27 December 1966 (aged 66); South Melbourne, Victoria
- Original team: Kyabram
- Debut: Grand Final, 2 October 1920, Richmond vs. Collingwood, at MCG
- Height: 165 cm (5 ft 5 in)
- Weight: 60 kg (132 lb)

Playing career^{1}
Years	Club	Games (Goals)
1920	Richmond	1 (1)
- ^{1} Playing statistics correct to the end of 1920.

Career highlights
- Richmond Premiership Player 1920; Kyabram Premiership Player 1919, 1921 & 1922.

William Roy James (10 May 1900 – 27 December 1966) was an Australian rules footballer who played one game with the Richmond Football Club in the Victorian Football League—the 1920 VFL Grand Final.

James came from Kyabram and was the eldest of seven brothers and after playing in their 1919 Goulburn Valley Football League premiership team and then after "starring" in Kyabram's losing 1920 first semi final match, James played his only VFL game in Richmond's 1920 VFL grand final premiership side. He helped Richmond earn the Tigers their inaugural VFL premiership, with his only goal late in the last quarter sealing the victory.

James was retrospectively awarded a Richmond FC life membership for his contribution in 2017.

According to legend, James was accidentally shot in the foot whilst out hunting prior to the commencement of the 1921 season, an injury which supposedly ended his football career. However, he actually returned to Kyabram where he had farming responsibilities, and played with Kyabram for several more years, including their 1921 and 1922 Goulburn Valley Football League premiership teams, before the hunting injury, which actually occurred in January, 1925.

James was elected as the secretary of the Kyabram Football Club in 1926, a position he held until 1928, after the shooting injury ended his playing career.
