= Ernie Wilson =

Australian rules footballer, born 1900

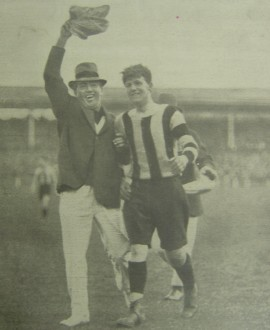
- Wilson (right) in 1925

Personal information
- Full name: Ernest George Wilson
- Born: 18 October 1900; Collingwood, Victoria
- Died: 7 June 1982 (aged 81); Sandringham, Victoria
- Original team: South Yarra
- Height: 170 cm (5 ft 7 in)
- Weight: 73 kg (161 lb)
- Position: Half back

Playing career^{1}
Years	Club	Games (Goals)
1919–1928	Collingwood	126 (9)
- ^{1} Playing statistics correct to the end of 1928.

Ernest George 'Ernie' Wilson (18 October 1900 – 7 June 1982) was an Australian rules footballer who played for Collingwood in the Victorian Football League (VFL).

Wilson was featured on the Collingwood side during a strong era, playing in no less than six Grand Finals. He was on a half forward flank in their 1919 premiership but was used mostly as a defender. His other Grand Final appearances came in 1920, 1922, 1925 and 1926 while he was a half back flanker in the Collingwood premiership team of 1927. He could have added another in 1928, but lost his place in the side after the drawn semi final against Melbourne which would be his last game. In 1929 he played with Northcote in the VFA. He was reported in the last few minutes of the Grand Final which Northcote won by 5 points. He received a 12-month suspension for the offense and returned to Collingwood in 1930 where he captain coached the reserve team until the end of the 1933 season. He also represented Victoria at interstate football, a total of nine times, including in the 1924 Hobart Carnival. He remains the only player to have represented Victoria whilst under suspension from the VFL.
