= George Parkinson (footballer, born 1892) =

Australian rules footballer

Personal information
- Full name: Walter George Parkinson
- Born: 30 March 1892; Kyabram, Victoria
- Died: 11 September 1959 (aged 67); Caulfield, Victoria
- Original team: Kyabram
- Height: 183 cm (6 ft 0 in)
- Weight: 84 kg (185 lb)

Playing career^{1}
Years	Club	Games (Goals)
1919–1921	Richmond	12 (0)
- ^{1} Playing statistics correct to the end of 1921.

Career highlights
- Richmond Premiership Player 1920

Walter George Parkinson (30 March 1892 – 11 September 1959) was an Australian rules footballer who played in the VFL between 1919 and 1921 for the Richmond Football Club.

Between 1900 and 1940 the Goulburn Valley Football League matches were played on a Wednesday afternoon and some of the better players who were based in and around the Shepparton and Kyabram area would also play VFL football on a Saturday, which Parkinson did from 1919 to 1921.

Parkinson was a member of Richmond's 1920 VFL premiership side.
