= Charlie Pannam (footballer, born 1897) =

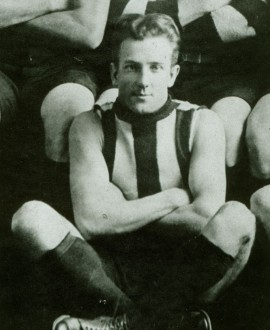
- Pannam during his Collingwood career

Personal information
- Full name: Charles Elliott Pannam
- Born: 21 April 1897; Collingwood, Victoria, Australia
- Died: 25 November 1961 (aged 64); Box Hill, Victoria
- Height: 174 cm (5 ft 9 in)
- Weight: 69 kg (152 lb)

Playing career^{1}
Years	Club	Games (Goals)
1917–1922	Collingwood	97 (12)
1926–1928	South Melbourne	45 (31)
Total		142 (43)

Coaching career
Years	Club	Games (W–L–D)
1923–1928	South Melbourne	108 (54–54–0)
- ^{1} Playing statistics correct to the end of 1928.

Charles Elliott Pannam (21 April 1897 – 25 November 1961) was an Australian rules footballer and VFL umpire who played for Collingwood and South Melbourne in the Victorian Football League (VFL). He was the son of a Greek-Australian Aussie rules footballing legend Charlie Pannam and the brother of Alby Pannam, and he was a grandfather to Australian Football Hall of Fame player and media personality Lou Richards.

== Football career ==
Pannam spent six seasons with Collingwood and played in Grand Finals in all but one of them, winning premierships in 1917 and 1919. He played mostly in the middle of the ground, as either a wingman or centreman. In 1923, he joined South Melbourne as coach, and for his first three years in charge he did so in a non-playing capacity, but from 1926 to 1928 took the field as captain. His tally of 108 games as South Melbourne coach remained a record for more than half a century until passed by Ian Stewart in 1981.

In later years, Pannam returned to Collingwood and filled a range of administrative roles including team manager of the under-nineteens and secretary of the Old Players' Association.

At the completion of the 1928 season, Pannam took up the captain-coach position with Brunswick in the VFA. Brunswick finished fourth in the home and away rounds and fell seven points short of Port Melbourne in the first semi-final. Pannam had been reported in July and suspended for three matches but was back for the run to the finals and was amongst Brunswick's best in the final. The following year was not successful. Pannam moved to coaching only during the season for health reasons and the club finished ninth, being one of the bottom four eliminated two rounds prior to the finals.

Pannam captained-coach again in 1931, leading Brunswick to an improved seventh position, but in 1932 he was replaced by Vic Belcher.

== Umpiring ==
Following his playing-coaching career, Pannam took up field umpiring and was immediately placed on the VFL field umpires list. After an indifferent start, he found his feet and must have had the confidence of the Umpires' Appointment Board given that for much of the second half of 1932 he officiated in the Bendigo League, one of the prime weekly appointments.

Over the ensuing two seasons, he umpired all over Victoria and accumulated 45 country matches in all. The first finals match he umpired was the 1933 Peninsula Football Association Second Semi Final. So impressive was he that the association requested and received him for the following week's final. These were to be his only finals.

Pannam retired at the close of the 1934 season.
