= Harry Curtis (footballer) =

Australian rules footballer

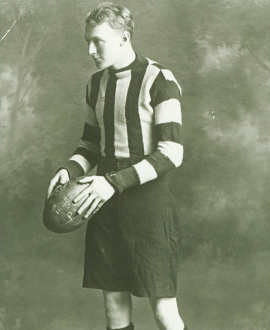
- Curtis during his Collingwood career

Personal information
- Full name: Harry Richard Curtis
- Born: 3 October 1892; Carlton, Victoria
- Died: 31 March 1968 (aged 75); South Melbourne, Victoria
- Original team: Carlton Collegians
- Debut: Round 14, 1913, Carlton vs. University, at Princes Park
- Height: 189 cm (6 ft 2 in)
- Weight: 79 kg (174 lb)

Playing career^{1}
Years	Club	Games (Goals)
1913	Carlton	2 (1)
1914–1923	Collingwood	122 (149)
Total		124 (150)
- ^{1} Playing statistics correct to the end of 1923.

Harry Richard Curtis (3 October 1892 – 31 March 1968) was an Australian rules footballer who played for Carlton and Collingwood in the VFL.

== Biography ==
Curtis started his career as a ruckman at Carlton, the club his older brother, Charles Ernest Curtis (1878-1959), had played for.

He could only manage two senior appearances in the 1913 season and the following year debuted for Collingwood. Although he was a ruckman in Collingwood's losing 1915 Grand Final side, he was used mostly by the club as a centre half-forward. It was in that position that he played in both the 1917 and 1919 premierships at Collingwood. He was one of the key players in the 1917 Grand Final with three goals and played in another losing Grand Final in 1920.

In 1923, his final season, Curtis captained the Magpies before retiring due to business commitments. He served at Collingwood's president from 1924 to 1950, a record stretch by a president of any VFL/AFL club. In 2007 he was inducted into Collingwood's Hall of Fame.
