= Bob Weatherill =

Australian rules footballer

Personal information
- Full name: Robert Roy Weatherill
- Born: 20 July 1897; Hawthorn, Victoria
- Died: 18 July 1992 (aged 94); Melbourne, Victoria
- Original team: Camberwell Juniors
- Height: 180 cm (5 ft 11 in)
- Weight: 70 kg (154 lb)

Playing career^{1}
| Years | Club | Games (Goals) |
| 1917–1923 | Richmond | 72 (44) |
- ^{1} Playing statistics correct to the end of 1923.

Career highlights
- Richmond Premiership Player 1920, 1921; Interstate Games:- 1

Robert Roy Weatherill (20 July 1897 – 18 July 1992) was an Australian rules footballer who played in the VFL between 1917 and 1923 for the Richmond Football Club.
