= Stan Morris =

Australian rules footballer

Personal information
- Full name: Stanley Henry Morris
- Born: 1 October 1893
- Died: 3 December 1948 (aged 55); Hawthorn, Victoria
- Original team: St Kilda CBC/Hawthorn (VFA)
- Height: 170 cm (5 ft 7 in)
- Weight: 66 kg (146 lb)

Playing career^{1}
| Years | Club | Games (Goals) |
| 1919–1922 | Richmond | 52 (4) |
- ^{1} Playing statistics correct to the end of 1922.

Career highlights
- Richmond premiership player: 1920; Interstate games: 2

Stan Morris (1 October 1893 – 3 December 1948) was an Australian rules footballer who played in the Victorian Football League (VFL) between 1919 and 1922 for the Richmond Football Club.
