= Dan Minogue =

Australian rules footballer and coach

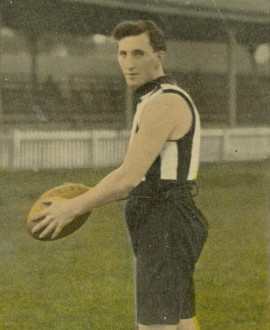
- Dan Minogue, holding a Sherrin football, during his Collingwood career

Personal information
- Full name: Daniel Thomas Minogue
- Born: 4 September 1891; Bendigo, Victoria
- Died: 27 July 1961 (aged 69); Repatriation General Hospital, Heidelberg, Victoria
- Original teams: St Killian's; California Gully
- Height: 180 cm (5 ft 11 in)
- Weight: 87 kg (192 lb)

Playing career^{1}
Years	Club	Games (Goals)
1911–1916	Collingwood	85 (37)
1920–1925	Richmond	94 (38)
1926	Hawthorn	1 (2)
Total		180 (77)

Coaching career^{3}
Years	Club	Games (W–L–D)
1920–1925	Richmond	105 (59–45–1)
1926–1927	Hawthorn	36 (4–31–1)
1929–1934	Carlton	117 (85–32–0)
1935–1937	St Kilda	54 (30–24–0)
1940–1942	Fitzroy	51 (25–26–0)
Total		363 (203–158–2)
- ^{1} Playing statistics correct to the end of 1926.^{3} Coaching statistics correct as of 1942.

Career highlights
- AIF Pioneer Exhibition Game, London, 28 October 1916; Richmond premiership captain-coach 1920, 1921; Collingwood captain 1914–1916; Richmond captain 1920–1925; Hawthorn captain 1926; Australian Football Hall of Fame, inducted 1996; Richmond Hall of Fame, inducted 2002

Daniel Thomas Minogue (4 September 1891 – 27 July 1961) was an Australian rules footballer, who played with three clubs in the (then) Victorian Football League (VFL), and who was the coach of five VFL clubs.

== Family ==
The son of Matthew Minogue (1868-1899), and Ellen Minogue (1868-1896), née Madden, Daniel Thomas Minogue was born at Bendigo on 4 September 1891.

He married Ann Marion Morrison (1893-1968) on 30 March 1921.

== Education ==
He was educated at the Marist Brothers' College, Bendigo.

== Football ==
=== Collingwood (VFL) ===
Minogue was considered a courageous, or perhaps reckless, centre half-back. On one occasion he sustained a broken collarbone playing for Collingwood Football Club in the first minute of the 1911 VFL Grand Final and then played out the entire match.

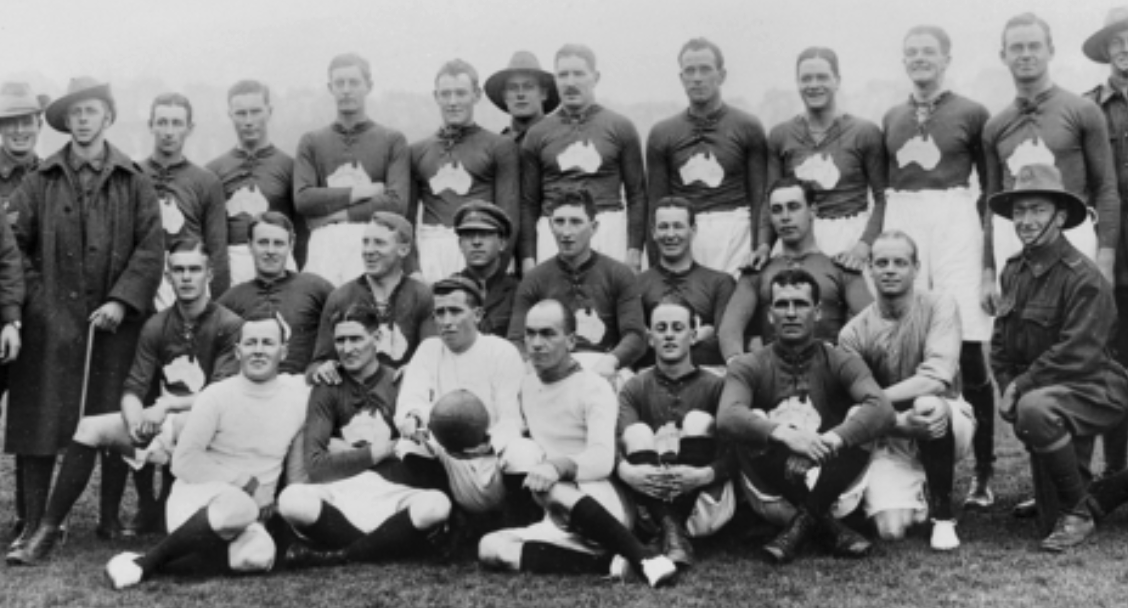
The Third Australian Divisional Team: 28 October 1916. Minogue is the fifth player from left, in the middle row.

=== Third Divisional team (AIF) ===
While serving in World War I, Minogue vice-captained the (winning) Third Australian Divisional team in the famous "Pioneer Exhibition Game" of Australian Rules football, held in London, in October 1916. A news film was taken at the match.

=== Richmond (VFL) ===
Unhappy at Collingwood's treatment of his friend and former teammate, Jim Sadler, during the war, Minogue demanded a transfer to Richmond on his return from AIF service during World War I

Former skipper Dan Minogue, a close friend who worked with Sadler at the South Melbourne gasworks, had become intensely unhappy with what he felt had been the club’s unfair treatment of his mate. It was never clearly articulated, but he seems to have believed that Sadler wasn’t given the opportunities he deserved across 1916-17. So even though Sadler’s retirement letter betrayed no bitterness, Minogue was furious. And his fury festered while serving his country in France during the First World War. So deep-seated was Minogue’s anger that, when he came home in 1919, he stunned the football world by refusing to play with Collingwood, opting instead for Richmond.

Minogue's choice of Richmond was also due to a VFL rule stating that returning soldiers had to play for the club in whose district they took up residence after returnkgn to Australia, even when that was not the club they previously played with. This created ill feeling and he had to stand out of competition for twelve months in order to secure the transfer.

== Coach ==
In addition to playing at three VFL clubs (Collingwood, Richmond, and Hawthorn) he also coached at five VFL clubs (Richmond, Hawthorn, Carlton, St Kilda, and Fitzroy) — a record which (as of June 2022) is yet to be equalled.

== VFL players' advocate ==
In August 1947, he was appointed as the official VFL players's advocate; a position he held until his death.

== Death ==
He died at the Repatriation General Hospital, in Heidelberg, Victoria, on 27 July 1961.

== Hall of fame ==
In 1996 Minogue was inducted into the Australian Football Hall of Fame.

== See also ==
- 1916 Pioneer Exhibition Game
