= Reg Hede =

Australian rules footballer

Personal information
- Full name: Reginald Thomas Hede
- Born: 9 October 1894; Ballarat East, Victoria
- Died: 16 April 1970 (aged 75); Prahran, Victoria
- Original teams: Christian Brothers, Abbotsford/Beverley
- Height: 173 cm (5 ft 8 in)
- Weight: 66 kg (146 lb)

Playing career^{1}
Years	Club	Games (Goals)
1914–1921	Richmond	85 (1)
- ^{1} Playing statistics correct to the end of 1921.

Career highlights
- Richmond Premiership Player 1920

Reginald Thomas Hede (9 October 1894 – 16 April 1970) was an Australian rules footballer who played in the VFL between 1914 and 1921 for the Richmond Football Club.

== Family ==
The son of Francis Hede (1852–1907), and Mary Hede (1856–1922), née Brennan, Reginald Thomas Hede was born in East Ballarat on 9 October 1894.

== Football ==
Midway through the 1921 season Hede transferred from Richmond to the Camberwell Football Club (prior to its admission to the VFA) in the Victorian Sub District League, and played in premiership winning teams for the next three seasons.
