= Robert Carew (footballer) =

Australian rules footballer

Personal information
- Full name: Robert Edmund Carew
- Born: 1 December 1898; Williamstown, Victoria
- Died: 5 September 1969 (aged 70); Malvern East, Victoria
- Original team: East Melbourne CBC/Middle Park CYMS (CYMSFA)/Taxation
- Height: 173 cm (5 ft 8 in)
- Weight: 72.5 kg (160 lb)

Playing career^{1}
Years	Club	Games (Goals)
1919–1922	Richmond	45 (6)
- ^{1} Playing statistics correct to the end of 1922.

Career highlights
- Richmond Premiership Player 1920, 1921; Interstate Games: 1

Robert Edmund Carew (1 December 1898 – 5 September 1969) was an Australian rules footballer who played in the VFL between 1919 and 1922 for the Richmond Football Club.
