= David Moffatt =

Australian rules footballer

Personal information
- Full name: David John Thomas Moffatt
- Born: 18 May 1892; South Melbourne, Victoria
- Died: 8 November 1950 (aged 58); Richmond, Victoria
- Original team: Carlton Districts
- Height: 188 cm (6 ft 2 in)
- Weight: 92 kg (203 lb)

Playing career^{1}
Years	Club	Games (Goals)
1912–1917, 1919–1920	Richmond	95 (25)
- ^{1} Playing statistics correct to the end of 1920.

Career highlights
- Richmond Premiership Player 1920

David John Thomas Moffatt (18 May 1892 – 8 November 1950) was an Australian rules footballer who played in the VFL between 1912 and 1917 and finally in 1919 and 1920 for the Richmond Football Club.
