= Frank Harley =

Australian rules footballer

Personal information
- Born: 29 June 1895; Albert Park, Victoria
- Died: 14 December 1978 (aged 83); Glen Iris, Victoria
- Original team: Fortrose / Leopold
- Height: 178 cm (5 ft 10 in)
- Weight: 73 kg (161 lb)

Playing career^{1}
Years	Club	Games (Goals)
1915–1917, 1919–1925	Richmond	114 (66)
- ^{1} Playing statistics correct to the end of 1925.

Career highlights
- Richmond Premiership Player 1920, 1921; Richmond Life Member 1924; Victorian Representative Team Games: 3; Prahran Leading Goalkicker 1926 Goals 72, 1927 Goals 74; Alphington Leading Goalkicker 1928 Goals 80, 1929 Goals 37

Frank Harley (29 June 1895 – 14 December 1978) was an Australian rules footballer who played in the VFL between 1915 and 1917 and then from 1919 to 1925 for the Richmond Football Club.
