= Vic Thorp =

Australian rules footballer

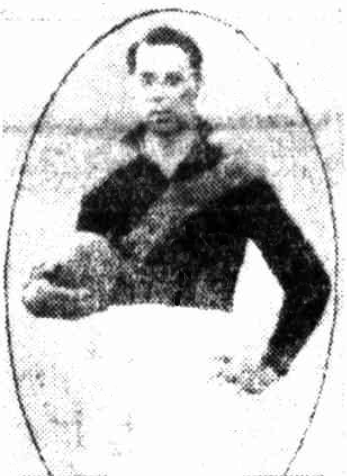

Personal information
- Full name: Victor Charles Thorp
- Born: 25 October 1890; Fitzroy, Victoria
- Died: 1 October 1941 (aged 50); Mordialloc, Victoria
- Original team: Beverley FC
- Height: 178 cm (5 ft 10 in)
- Weight: 82.5 kg (182 lb)
- Position: full-back

Playing career^{1}
Years	Club	Games (Goals)
1910–1925	Richmond	263 (7)
- ^{1} Playing statistics correct to the end of 1925.

Career highlights
- Richmond Premiership Player 1920, 1921; Interstate Games: 14; Richmond – Team of the Century; Richmond Hall of Fame, inducted 2002; Richmond "Immortal", conferred 2015; Australian Football Hall of Fame

Victor Charles Thorp (25 October 1890 – 1 October 1941) was an Australian rules footballer for the Richmond Football Club in the Victorian Football League between 1910 and 1925.

Nicknamed "Flippa", Thorp was the first true champion player to emerge at Richmond after their admission to the VFL in 1908. A natural defender who showed great judgement, superior ball skills and fierce concentration, Thorp was considered the best player in the game at his position, full back. His battles with Collingwood forward Dick Lee were a highlight of the era. Thorp was one of many great players who grew up in the shadow of the Tigers' Punt Road Oval and served the club loyally for many years, thus influencing the development of the parochial culture of the Richmond club.

== Family ==
The fifth and youngest child of Charles Frederick Thorp (1855–1928), and Emma Florance "Amy" Thorp (1858–1942), née Brandon, Victor Charles Thorp was born at Fitzroy, Victoria on 25 October 1890.

=== Marriage ===
He married Rita Nichol Davies (1910—2000), in New Town, Tasmania, on 17 April 1938.

=== Question of "Aboriginality" ===
Because Thorp had a noticeably dark complexion, it has been speculated, by some, in modern times that Thorp was aboriginal. Yet, although Colin Tatz (academia's 'authority' on aboriginal sportspeople) listed Thorp as "possibly" an aborigine (Tatz, 1995), there is no evidence that Thorp ever identified as aboriginal. In fact, there's a far simpler explanation for Thorp's dark complexion: Thorp's maternal grandfather, George Bryden Brandon (1824—1896), was born in Jamaica, to a Sephardic Jewish father, Moses Brandon (1786—1835), and an African former-enslaved mother, Susannah Andrews (1793–1875).

== Formative years ==
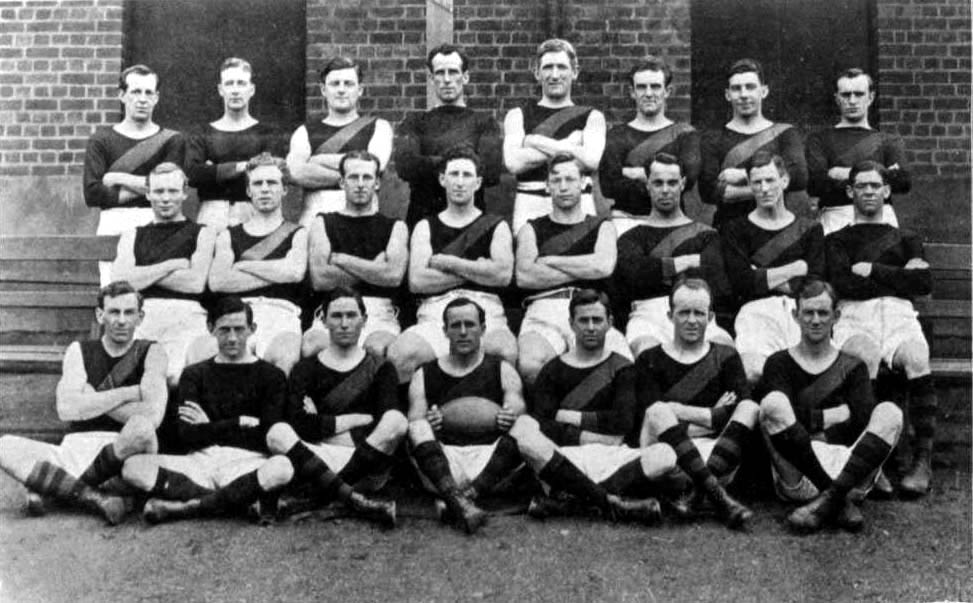
Richmond's 1920 Premiership Team: Thorp, third from right, middle row.

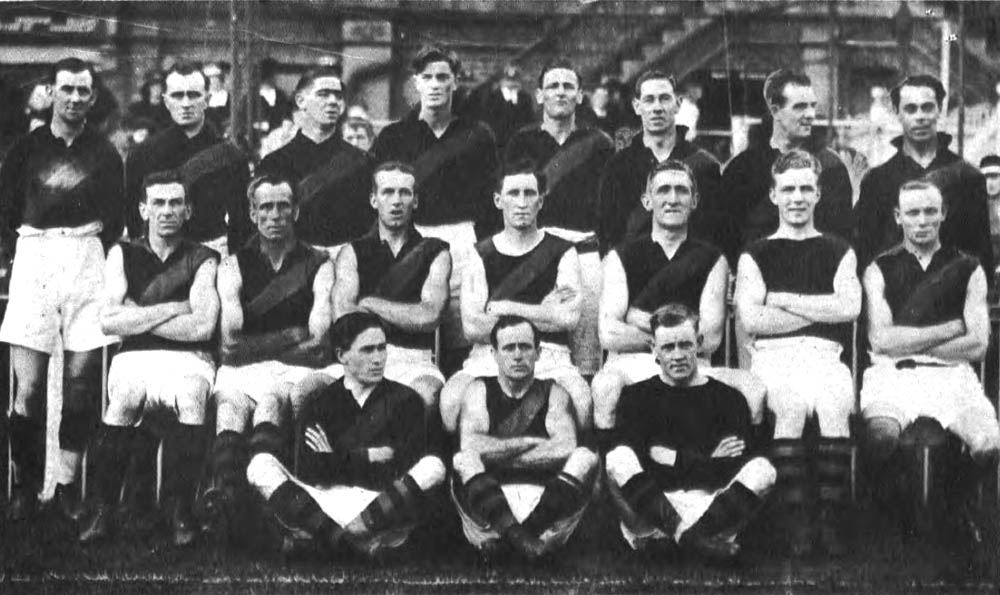
Richmond's 1921 Premiership Team: Thorp, extreme right, back row.

As a child, Thorp attended the Yarra Park School (now defunct), just a few hundred metres to the north of Punt Road Oval and played his early football there. After leaving school in 1907, he joined Beverley, a club in the Metropolitan Football Association. At this time, the VFL didn't conduct a reserves competition, so district clubs (such as Beverley) acted as a de facto reserves teams. Also non-existent was any form of zoning, so Thorp was free to accept an invitation to trial with St Kilda. The Saints made one of the great errors in rejecting Thorp, who went to Richmond in 1910. In its early seasons in the VFL, Richmond frantically turned over dozens of players looking for a combination that could compete with the best in the competition. It would prove a long, drawn out process. While most failed and disappeared quickly, the Tigers knew immediately they had a find in the nineteen-year-old with the swarthy complexion.

In his debut season, Thorp walked straight into the team and played all eighteen games. As a full back, he impressed with his fine judgement when going for the ball. He seemed to instinctively know when to play from behind and when to position himself in front. Although only of average height (178 cm), Thorp was very solidly built at 83 kg and his kicking skills stood out. Charged with the duty of kicking in after the opposition had scored a behind, Thorp regularly thrilled the crowd with long drop kicks to clear the Tigers' defensive area.

== The War era ==
When numbers were first used on players' guernseys in 1912, Thorp received the number 5. By the outbreak of World War I he was a veteran of five seasons, during which he had missed just four matches. Although considered one of the best defenders in the game, Thorp had not yet been chosen for Victoria when state matches went into recess because of the war. Perhaps Thorp's failure to win representative honours was influenced by the mediocre performances of his team. Despite producing a number of brilliant individuals, the best of whom was Thorp, the club couldn't create a synergy between its off-field and on-field personnel, and constantly turned over its leadership positions and endured several take-overs at committee level.

Unlike many of his teammates, Thorp decided against enlistment for the war. In 1916, the VFL competition was reduced to just four clubs, but still played a finals series. Richmond decided to compete and were guaranteed a place in the finals for the first time, and went on to an unlucky semi final loss to Carlton by three points.

In another truncated season, the Tigers finished the season last of the six teams. The following year was little better for the team, but at least the war finally ended on 11 November and football could look forward to a return to normal.

== Success at last ==
With the appointment of ex-Carlton premiership coach Norm Clark and many of Richmond's best players returning from military service in Europe, 1919 proved to be the turning point for Richmond. Thorp was in career-best form, gaining life membership of the club and representing Victoria, for the first time, when interstate fixtures were resumed. Richmond made the Grand Final to the surprise of many, only to lose to Collingwood. In the following year, Richmond stirred the rivalry with the Magpies by appointing ex-Collingwood skipper Dan Minogue as playing coach. After winning the minor premiership, Richmond went on to defeat Collingwood for the flag. With Dick Lee injured and unable to take his place in the Magpies side, Thorp was able to easily blanket his replacement, Harry Curtis, and contribute significantly to the result.

Richmond followed up with a second flag in 1921. At the business end of the season, Thorp dominated the semi-final thrashing of Geelong and was instrumental in two upset victories over Carlton by winning his duels with the Blues' captain Gordon Green. The team slipped backwards in 1922–23, due to retirements and transfers, but a highlight came on 22 June 1922, when in a match at Fitzroy, Vic Thorp became the first Tiger to play 200 VFL games.

Richmond returned to finals action in 1924. The Tigers won their last final, against Essendon, but didn't win the premiership as the Grand Final was abolished and a round robin tournament played in its stead. This controversial system was never used again to decide the premiership, which was little consolation to the disenfranchised Richmond players.

== Retirement and after ==
After the belated start to his representative career, Thorp had racked up an amazing fourteen appearances in the Big V in only six years. Heading into the 1925 season aged 34, Thorp played every week and then decided to retire, still on top of his game. In sixteen seasons, he had missed just ten matches, with his worst injury a broken wrist that cost him three games in 1914. Overall, it was a tribute to his sportsmanship and integrity as a player. During his career he had played a major part in the Tigers' rise from mediocrity to the dizzy heights of winning successive premierships that cemented their place as one of the powerhouses of the competition. Thorp appeared in every big game and final the Tigers played, and was always a steady influence when the chips were down. Unfortunately for the Tigers, they couldn't find an adequate replacement for him until the early 1930s, by which time they had lost a succession of Grand Finals when the weakness at full back was often exposed.

Thorp was elected to the Richmond committee in 1927, after a brief sojourn at the VFA club Prahran, where he ironically played as a forward and led the club's goalkicking. Thorp remained a stalwart of Richmond all his life, running a tea merchant business in the suburb and serving as committeeman until 1935. He also wrote regular articles for Melbourne's Sporting Globe.

== Death ==
Thorp died at Mordialloc, Victoria on 1 October 1941, aged only 50; and, at the time of his death, he was still held Richmond's record for the number of games played.

== Australian Football Hall of Fame ==
In 1996, Thorp was elected as an inaugural member of the Australian Football Hall of Fame, the only Richmond player of the pre-World War I era to receive the honour.

== Richmond "Team of the Century" ==
In 1998, Thorp was selected at full-back in Richmond's "Team of the Century".
