= Clarrie Hall =

Australian rules footballer

Personal information
- Full name: Clarence Herbert Hall
- Born: 18 January 1890; Melbourne, Victoria
- Died: 3 September 1976 (aged 86); Melbourne, Victoria
- Original team: Leopold/Prahran
- Height: 160 cm (5 ft 3 in)
- Weight: 63.5 kg (140 lb)

Playing career^{1}
Years	Club	Games (Goals)
1912–1922, 1924	Richmond	150 (169)
- ^{1} Playing statistics correct to the end of 1924.

Career highlights
- Richmond Premiership Player 1920, 1921; Richmond Leading Goalkicker 1914, 1915; Richmond Captain 1918; Interstate Games:- 2; Richmond - Hall of Fame - inducted 2006

Clarence Herbert Hall (18 January 1890 – 3 September 1976) was an Australian rules footballer who played in the VFL between 1912 and 1922 and then one game in 1924 for the Richmond Football Club.
