= Max Hislop =

Australian rules footballer and coach

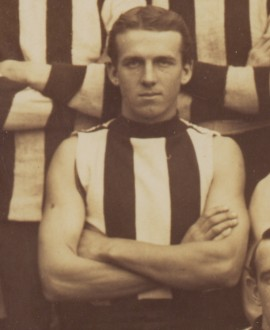
- Hislop in 1914

Personal information
- Full name: Andrew McEwan Hislop
- Born: 25 August 1895; Swan Hill, Victoria
- Died: 10 July 1964 (aged 68); Victoria, Australia
- Original team: Swan Hill
- Height: 178 cm (5 ft 10 in)
- Weight: 82.5 kg (182 lb)

Playing career^{1}
| Years | Club | Games (Goals) |
| 1914 | Collingwood | 9 (4) |
| 1915 | Melbourne | 1 (0) |
| 1917–24; 1927 | Richmond | 128 (4) |
| Total | | 138 (8) |

Representative team honours
| Years | Team | Games (Goals) |
| | Victoria | 6 |
- ^{1} Playing statistics correct to the end of 1927.

Career highlights
- Richmond premiership player 1920, 1921

Andrew McEwan "Max" Hislop (25 August 1895 – 10 July 1964) was an Australian rules footballer who played in the Victorian Football League (VFL) in 1914 for the Collingwood Football Club, one game in 1915 for the Melbourne Football Club and then between 1917 and 1924 and finally in 1927 for the Richmond Football Club, after moving to Tasmania to coach New Town in 1925 and 1926.
