= James Smith (Australian rules footballer) =

Australian rules footballer (1899–1974)

Personal information
- Full name: Cyril James Smith
- Born: 25 January 1899; Richmond, Victoria
- Died: 11 January 1974 (aged 74); Preston, Victoria
- Original team: Yarra Park School
- Height: 178 cm (5 ft 10 in)
- Weight: 76 kg (168 lb)

Playing career^{1}
Years	Club	Games (Goals)
1917–1926	Richmond	132 (40)
- ^{1} Playing statistics correct to the end of 1926.

Career highlights
- Richmond Premiership Player 1920, 1921; Interstate Games:- 5

Cyril James 'Jimmy' Smith (25 January 1899 – 11 January 1974) was an Australian rules footballer who played in the VFL between 1917 and 1926 for the Richmond Football Club.

Smith also served on the Richmond Football Club Committee between 1927 and 1931.
