= George Bayliss =

Australian rules footballer

Personal information
- Born: 30 March 1895; Coburg, Victoria
- Died: 2 July 1935 (aged 40); Royal Park, Melbourne
- Original team: Balmain Church of Christ
- Height: 179 cm (5 ft 10 in)
- Weight: 74.5 kg (164 lb)

Playing career^{1}
Years	Club	Games (Goals)
1914–23	Richmond	89 (217)
1925	Footscray	9 (18)
Total		98 (235)
- ^{1} Playing statistics correct to the end of 1925.

Career highlights
- Richmond Premiership Player 1921; Richmond Leading Goalkicker 1920, 1921, 1922; VFL Leading Goalkicker Medal 1920

George Bayliss (30 March 1895 – 2 July 1935) was an Australian rules footballer who played in the Victorian Football League (VFL) and the Victorian Football Association (VFA) over three decades.

== Football ==
He played for the Richmond Football Club in 1914 and then again from 1916 to 1923 (inclusive).

He then played for the Footscray Football Club in the Victorian Football Association (VFA) in 1924 then in the VFL in 1925.

He played one game for Camberwell Football Club, in Round 6, 1930.

== Death ==
He died at the Victorian Benevolent Home, at Royal Park, Melbourne, on 2 July 1935.
