= Barney Herbert =

Australian rules footballer (1889–1949)

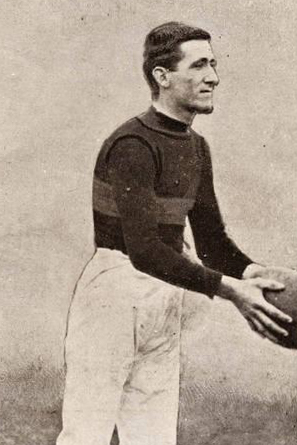
- Herbert in 1910

Personal information
- Full name: Bernard Vincent Herbert
- Born: 20 February 1889; Collingwood, Victoria
- Died: 14 December 1949 (aged 60); Coburg, Victoria
- Original team: Collingwood Trades/Beverley FC
- Height: 188 cm (6 ft 2 in)
- Weight: 95.5 kg (211 lb)

Playing career^{1}
| Years | Club | Games (Goals) |
| 1909–1921 | Richmond | 192 (90) |
- ^{1} Playing statistics correct to the end of 1921.

Career highlights
- Richmond Premiership Player 1920, 1921; Interstate Games:- 4; Richmond – Hall of Fame – inducted 2004

Bernard Vincent Herbert (20 February 1889 – 14 December 1949) was an Australian rules footballer who played in the VFL between 1909 and 1921 for the Richmond Football Club. He served as Richmond's President from 1932 to 1935 and again in 1939.

He later became an inspector in the Victorian Police Force, and was awarded the 'Valour' award for bravery while on duty.
