= 1924 VFL season =

28th season of the Victorian Football League (VFL)

1924 VFL premiership season
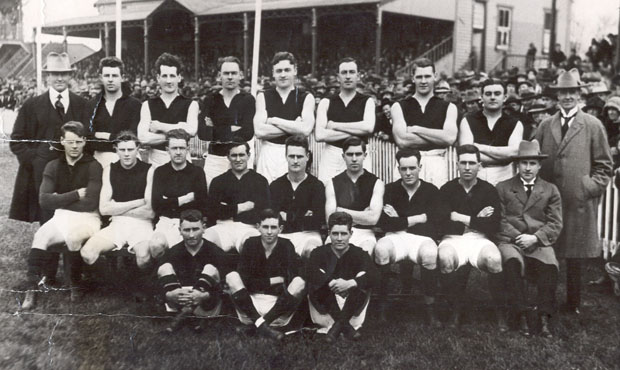
- Essendon 1924 VFL premiership team

Overview
- Date: 26 April – 27 September 1924
- Teams: 9
- Premiers: Essendon; 6th premiership
- Runners-up: Richmond; 2nd runners-up result
- Minor premiers: Essendon; 4th minor premiership
- Brownlow Medallist: Carji Greeves (Geelong); 7 votes
- Leading goalkicker medallist: Jack Moriarty (Fitzroy); 75 goals

Attendance
- Matches played: 78
- Total attendance: 1,646,273 (21,106 per match)
- Highest (H&A): 40,000 (round 2, Carlton v Essendon)
- Highest (finals): 44,522 (semi-final, Essendon v Fitzroy)

The 1924 VFL season was the 28th season of the Victorian Football League (VFL), the highest-level senior Australian rules football competition in Victoria. The season featured nine clubs and ran from 26 April to 27 September, comprising a 16-match home-and-away season followed by a three-week finals series featuring the top four clubs.

Essendon won the premiership by finishing atop the finals ladder at the end of the round-robin series with a 2–1 win–loss record and superior percentage to runners-up Richmond; it was Essendon's second consecutive premiership and sixth VFL premiership overall. Essendon also won the minor premiership by finishing atop the home-and-away ladder with an 11–4–1 win–loss–draw record. Geelong's Carji Greeves won the inaugural Brownlow Medal as the league's best and fairest player, and Fitzroy's Jack Moriarty won the leading goalkicker medal as the league's leading goalkicker.

== Background ==
In 1924, the VFL competition consisted of nine teams of 18 on-the-field players each, with no reserves, although any of the 18 players who had left the playing field for any reason could later resume their place on the field at any time during the match. Each team played each other twice in a home-and-away season of 18 rounds (i.e., 16 matches and 2 byes); once the 18 round home-and-away season had finished, the 1924 VFL premiership was determined by an experimental 1924 finals system, which the VFL used in this season only. The format was similar to the round-robin format used in 1897 Finals System, but included the minor premier's right to challenge, which existed under the amended Argus System.

In 1924, the VFL dispensed with the amended Argus system and adopted a new finals system initially proposed by Carlton delegate Reg Hunt. The new scheme saw the top four clubs play a round-robin semi-finals series over three weeks, with two matches played each Saturday. Then, if the minor premiers did not finish on top of the round-robin ladder, a Grand Final would be played between the minor premiers and round-robin winner. Essendon ultimately finished on top of the finals ladder on the basis of its greater percentage than Richmond; and, as minor premier, Essendon won the premiership without a Grand Final.

The scheme was developed primarily as a result of demand for entry to finals matches in the early 1920s exceeding the capacity of the Melbourne Cricket Ground. It was noted that while an average of 80,000 spectators attended a four-game home-and-away round, the capacity of the Melbourne Cricket Ground was limited to about 55,000; and, as such, under the Argus system, in which only one final was played each day, many spectators were turned away. However, playing two semi-finals on each day would allow more spectators to attend.

The original intent of the system was partially realised, with 65,000 spectators attending the first week of semi-finals, and 60,000 attending the second week; although, only 42,000 attended the third week, when the dead rubber between South Melbourne and Fitzroy was played at the Melbourne Cricket Ground and the premiership-deciding Richmond–Essendon match was played on the smaller South Melbourne Cricket Ground. However, even the weeks with higher spectator numbers did not translate to better financial performance: extra competing teams meant more clubs whose members were entitled free admission and fewer neutral spectators paying at the gate. As a result, the new scheme was abandoned at the end of the year and the amended Argus system resumed from 1925.

== Home-and-away season ==
=== Round 1 ===
Home team	Home team score	Away team	Away team score	Venue	Crowd	Date
Richmond	10.7 (67)	South Melbourne	13.16 (94)	Punt Road Oval	20,000	26 April 1924
St Kilda	12.12 (84)	Melbourne	11.16 (82)	Junction Oval	15,000	26 April 1924
Essendon	8.15 (63)	Collingwood	12.7 (79)	Windy Hill	25,000	26 April 1924
Fitzroy	16.9 (105)	Carlton	15.13 (103)	Brunswick Street Oval	30,000	26 April 1924

=== Round 2 ===
Home team	Home team score	Away team	Away team score	Venue	Crowd	Date
Geelong	10.15 (75)	Richmond	7.11 (53)	Corio Oval	13,000	3 May 1924
Collingwood	10.17 (77)	St Kilda	7.15 (57)	Victoria Park	19,000	3 May 1924
Carlton	7.14 (56)	Essendon	7.14 (56)	Princes Park	40,000	3 May 1924
South Melbourne	7.15 (57)	Fitzroy	12.14 (86)	Lake Oval	28,000	3 May 1924

=== Round 3 ===
Home team	Home team score	Away team	Away team score	Venue	Crowd	Date
Fitzroy	14.13 (97)	Geelong	10.14 (74)	Brunswick Street Oval	20,000	10 May 1924
Essendon	12.13 (85)	South Melbourne	8.11 (59)	Windy Hill	25,000	10 May 1924
Melbourne	8.13 (61)	Collingwood	8.14 (62)	MCG	18,211	10 May 1924
St Kilda	9.22 (76)	Carlton	13.12 (90)	Junction Oval	26,000	10 May 1924

=== Round 4 ===
Home team	Home team score	Away team	Away team score	Venue	Crowd	Date
Carlton	11.10 (76)	Melbourne	14.25 (109)	Princes Park	23,000	17 May 1924
South Melbourne	12.9 (81)	St Kilda	7.11 (53)	Lake Oval	22,000	17 May 1924
Richmond	5.18 (48)	Fitzroy	10.14 (74)	Punt Road Oval	22,000	17 May 1924
Geelong	8.12 (60)	Essendon	12.8 (80)	Corio Oval	12,000	17 May 1924

=== Round 5 ===
Home team	Home team score	Away team	Away team score	Venue	Crowd	Date
Melbourne	10.16 (76)	South Melbourne	10.9 (69)	MCG	22,072	24 May 1924
Essendon	13.16 (94)	Richmond	3.13 (31)	Windy Hill	22,000	24 May 1924
St Kilda	13.24 (102)	Geelong	11.10 (76)	Junction Oval	16,000	24 May 1924
Collingwood	19.17 (131)	Carlton	16.11 (107)	Victoria Park	25,000	24 May 1924

=== Round 6 ===
Home team	Home team score	Away team	Away team score	Venue	Crowd	Date
Richmond	9.19 (73)	St Kilda	8.6 (54)	Punt Road Oval	20,000	31 May 1924
Geelong	9.19 (73)	Melbourne	9.9 (63)	Corio Oval	12,000	31 May 1924
Fitzroy	10.8 (68)	Essendon	8.13 (61)	Brunswick Street Oval	35,000	31 May 1924
South Melbourne	9.15 (69)	Collingwood	8.8 (56)	Lake Oval	25,000	31 May 1924

=== Round 7 ===
Home team	Home team score	Away team	Away team score	Venue	Crowd	Date
Collingwood	10.16 (76)	Geelong	11.16 (82)	Victoria Park	14,000	7 June 1924
Carlton	10.12 (72)	South Melbourne	11.12 (78)	Princes Park	29,000	7 June 1924
Melbourne	11.17 (83)	Richmond	13.9 (87)	MCG	27,533	9 June 1924
St Kilda	12.13 (85)	Fitzroy	14.9 (93)	Junction Oval	30,000	9 June 1924

=== Round 8 ===
Home team	Home team score	Away team	Away team score	Venue	Crowd	Date
Fitzroy	12.15 (87)	Melbourne	5.11 (41)	Brunswick Street Oval	15,000	14 June 1924
Essendon	16.17 (113)	St Kilda	3.13 (31)	Windy Hill	20,000	14 June 1924
Richmond	12.23 (95)	Collingwood	10.10 (70)	Punt Road Oval	21,000	14 June 1924
Geelong	9.12 (66)	Carlton	6.15 (51)	Corio Oval	12,000	14 June 1924

=== Round 9 ===
Home team	Home team score	Away team	Away team score	Venue	Crowd	Date
Collingwood	7.9 (51)	Fitzroy	9.14 (68)	Victoria Park	22,000	21 June 1924
Carlton	3.10 (28)	Richmond	5.8 (38)	Princes Park	21,000	21 June 1924
South Melbourne	7.6 (48)	Geelong	7.3 (45)	Lake Oval	20,000	21 June 1924
Melbourne	5.12 (42)	Essendon	10.11 (71)	MCG	18,769	21 June 1924

=== Round 10 ===
Home team	Home team score	Away team	Away team score	Venue	Crowd	Date
Melbourne	8.15 (63)	St Kilda	6.15 (51)	MCG	14,286	28 June 1924
Collingwood	4.10 (34)	Essendon	8.12 (60)	Victoria Park	20,000	28 June 1924
Carlton	15.14 (104)	Fitzroy	8.8 (56)	Princes Park	27,770	28 June 1924
South Melbourne	9.7 (61)	Richmond	5.13 (43)	Lake Oval	30,000	28 June 1924

=== Round 11 ===
Home team	Home team score	Away team	Away team score	Venue	Crowd	Date
Fitzroy	4.17 (41)	South Melbourne	9.10 (64)	Brunswick Street Oval	20,000	5 July 1924
Richmond	10.20 (80)	Geelong	9.8 (62)	Punt Road Oval	18,000	5 July 1924
St Kilda	16.16 (112)	Collingwood	6.16 (52)	Junction Oval	13,000	5 July 1924
Essendon	10.19 (79)	Carlton	8.14 (62)	Windy Hill	28,000	5 July 1924

=== Round 12 ===
Home team	Home team score	Away team	Away team score	Venue	Crowd	Date
Collingwood	11.10 (76)	Melbourne	7.11 (53)	Victoria Park	8,000	12 July 1924
Carlton	14.15 (99)	St Kilda	8.8 (56)	Princes Park	17,000	12 July 1924
Geelong	9.14 (68)	Fitzroy	9.11 (65)	Corio Oval	15,000	12 July 1924
South Melbourne	9.8 (62)	Essendon	6.13 (49)	Lake Oval	33,000	12 July 1924

=== Round 13 ===
Home team	Home team score	Away team	Away team score	Venue	Crowd	Date
St Kilda	13.14 (92)	South Melbourne	12.16 (88)	Junction Oval	25,000	19 July 1924
Fitzroy	7.12 (54)	Richmond	8.16 (64)	Brunswick Street Oval	26,000	19 July 1924
Essendon	10.14 (74)	Geelong	8.14 (62)	Windy Hill	20,000	19 July 1924
Melbourne	7.13 (55)	Carlton	9.8 (62)	MCG	17,931	19 July 1924

=== Round 14 ===
Home team	Home team score	Away team	Away team score	Venue	Crowd	Date
Geelong	18.15 (123)	St Kilda	7.6 (48)	Corio Oval	12,000	26 July 1924
Carlton	10.12 (72)	Collingwood	12.12 (84)	Princes Park	30,000	26 July 1924
South Melbourne	12.13 (85)	Melbourne	5.8 (38)	Lake Oval	16,000	26 July 1924
Richmond	7.14 (56)	Essendon	12.13 (85)	Punt Road Oval	38,000	26 July 1924

=== Round 15 ===
Home team	Home team score	Away team	Away team score	Venue	Crowd	Date
Essendon	9.19 (73)	Fitzroy	9.7 (61)	Windy Hill	26,000	2 August 1924
Collingwood	9.16 (70)	South Melbourne	6.15 (51)	Victoria Park	18,000	2 August 1924
St Kilda	5.9 (39)	Richmond	11.12 (78)	Junction Oval	10,000	2 August 1924
Melbourne	5.9 (39)	Geelong	8.8 (56)	MCG	7,382	2 August 1924

=== Round 16 ===
Home team	Home team score	Away team	Away team score	Venue	Crowd	Date
Fitzroy	16.13 (109)	St Kilda	6.10 (46)	Brunswick Street Oval	10,000	23 August 1924
Richmond	17.19 (121)	Melbourne	9.21 (75)	Punt Road Oval	14,000	23 August 1924
Geelong	9.19 (73)	Collingwood	5.6 (36)	Corio Oval	15,600	23 August 1924
South Melbourne	13.19 (97)	Carlton	4.7 (31)	Lake Oval	22,000	23 August 1924

=== Round 17 ===
Home team	Home team score	Away team	Away team score	Venue	Crowd	Date
Collingwood	6.13 (49)	Richmond	8.13 (61)	Victoria Park	21,000	30 August 1924
Carlton	9.7 (61)	Geelong	6.18 (54)	Princes Park	15,000	30 August 1924
Melbourne	9.13 (67)	Fitzroy	16.14 (110)	MCG	12,487	30 August 1924
St Kilda	9.5 (59)	Essendon	11.17 (83)	Junction Oval	20,000	30 August 1924

=== Round 18 ===
Home team	Home team score	Away team	Away team score	Venue	Crowd	Date
Geelong	9.13 (67)	South Melbourne	9.14 (68)	Corio Oval	16,500	6 September 1924
Essendon	12.10 (82)	Melbourne	14.12 (96)	Windy Hill	10,000	6 September 1924
Fitzroy	6.14 (50)	Collingwood	11.20 (86)	Brunswick Street Oval	13,000	6 September 1924
Richmond	12.16 (88)	Carlton	8.12 (60)	Punt Road Oval	30,000	6 September 1924

== Ladder ==
(P)	Premiers
	Qualified for finals

#	Team	P	W	L	D	PF	PA	%	Pts
1	Essendon (P)	16	11	4	1	1208	918	131.6	46
2	South Melbourne	16	11	5	0	1131	971	116.5	44
3	Fitzroy	16	10	6	0	1224	1092	112.1	40
4	Richmond	16	10	6	0	1083	1057	102.5	40
5	Geelong	16	8	8	0	1116	1041	107.2	32
6	Collingwood	16	8	8	0	1089	1134	96.0	32
7	Carlton	16	5	10	1	1134	1228	92.3	22
8	Melbourne	16	4	12	0	1043	1252	83.3	16
9	St Kilda	16	4	12	0	1045	1380	75.7	16

Rules for classification: 1. premiership points; 2. percentage; 3. points for
Average score: 70.0
Source: AFL Tables

== Finals series ==
=== Finals week 1 ===
Home team	Home team score	Away team	Away team score	Venue	Crowd	Date
Essendon	8.10 (58)	Fitzroy	2.6 (18)	MCG	42,522	13 September 1924
Richmond	13.7 (85)	South Melbourne	9.3 (57)	Windy Hill	22,300	13 September 1924

=== Finals week 2 ===
Home team	Home team score	Away team	Away team score	Venue	Crowd	Date
Fitzroy	11.10 (76)	Richmond	8.8 (56)	Princes Park	26,000	20 September 1924
Essendon	10.12 (72)	South Melbourne	4.15 (39)	MCG	35,407	20 September 1924

=== Finals week 3 ===
Home team	Home team score	Away team	Away team score	Venue	Crowd	Date
Richmond	9.13 (67)	Essendon	6.11 (47)	Lake Oval	25,000	27 September 1924
South Melbourne	13.8 (86)	Fitzroy	10.13 (73)	MCG	17,503	27 September 1924

=== Finals ladder ===
Because Essendon had won the minor premiership and the round-robin competition, it was awarded the premiership without the need for a grand final.

Won the premiership

#	Team	P	W	L	D	PF	PA	%	Pts
1	Essendon	3	2	1	0	177	124	142.7	8
2	Richmond	3	2	1	0	208	180	115.6	8
3	Fitzroy	3	1	2	0	167	200	83.5	4
4	South Melbourne	3	1	2	0	182	230	79.1	4

Rules for classification: 1. premiership points; 2. percentage; 3. points for
Source: AFL Tables

=== Finals team squads ===
As there was no designated grand final, this also meant that there were no grand final teams in 1924; instead there was an "Essendon finals squad", a "Fitzroy finals squad", a "Richmond finals squad", and a "South Melbourne finals squad". Listed in alphabetical order the four squads were:

- Essendon squad: Fred Baring, Syd Barker, Sr. (captain), Norm Beckton, Clyde Donaldson, Charlie Farrell, Tom Fitzmaurice, Jack Garden, Harry Gregory, Charlie Hardy, Harry Hunter, Tommy Jenkins, Roy Laing, Frank Maher, Charlie May, Justin McCarthy, George Rawle, George Shorten, Greg Stockdale, Jimmy Sullivan, and Rowley Watt.
- Fitzroy squad: Bill Adams, Jim Atkinson (captain), Arthur Batchelor, Les Bryant, Charlie Chapman, Goldie Collins, Tommy Corrigan, Arch Dickens, Steve Donnellan, Ern Elliott, Clive Fergie, Jimmy Freake, Len Gale, Tom Hickey, Horrie Jenkin, Gordon McCracken, Stan Molan, Jack Moriarty, Gordon Rattray, Jim Tarbotton, Len Wigraft, and Fred Williams.
- Richmond squad: Jack Barnett, Ted Bourke, Ralph Empey, Clarrie Hall, Joe Harrison, Doug Hayes, Gordon Hislop, Max Hislop, Jim Karthaus, Bob McCaskill, Norm McIntosh, Angus MacIsaac, Keith Millar, Dan Minogue (captain), Mel Morris, Reuben Reid, George Rudolph, James Smith, Jim Spain, Ernie Taylor, Vic Thorp, and George Valentine.
- South Melbourne squad: Harry Alexander, Bobby Allison, Phil Brooks, Martin Brown, Roy Cazaly (captain), Bill Condon, Fred Fleiter, Arthur Hando, Jacky Harris, Ted Johnson, Tom Joyce, Frank Laird, Harold Mahony, Herb Matthews, Bob McDonald, Charles McDonald, Gil Miller, Charlie Nicholls, Jack O'Connell, Ted O'Meara, Frank Ross, Joe Scanlan, Paddy Scanlan, Mark Tandy, and Les Woodfield.

== Season notes ==
- Administrator Charles Brownlow died on 23 January 1924; the Charles Brownlow Trophy, more commonly known as the Brownlow Medal, was instituted in his memory. The trophy was to be awarded to the "best and fairest player" in the VFL as determined by the votes of the field umpire at the end of each home-and-away match; from 1924 to 1930, there was a single vote cast per match.
- The VFL started fixing the schedule from 1924 to ensure that neither South Melbourne and St Kilda nor Melbourne and Richmond played home matches on the same day due to the heavy transport and labour burden associated with running the two nearby venues at the same time. This arrangement continued as long as the clubs played at nearby locations.
- Bill Twomey, Sr. who played for Collingwood (1918–1922) and would play for Hawthorn (1933–1934), the father of Collingwood's Bill Twomey, Jr. (1945–1958), Pat Twomey (1947–1949; 1952–1953), and Mick Twomey (1951–1961), and the grandfather of Collingwood's David Twomey (1979–1985) wins the 1924, 130-yard Stawell Gift in 12.1 seconds, off a handicap of 8½ yards.
- The Fitzroy versus Carlton match in the opening round was the first VFL match in which both teams scored 100 points.
- The VFL adopted the convention of home teams wearing black shorts and away teams wearing white shorts.
- Because the 1924 premiership was determined by a round-robin system, Essendon won the premiership despite being beaten by runners-up Richmond 9.13 (67) to 6.11 (47) in the last round-robin match; this is the only time in VFL/AFL history that the premiers lost their last match of the season. Richmond would have needed to win by at least 43 points to challenge Essendon to a grand final.
- Many of the Essendon players were unhappy at the poor performances of some of their teammates in the final round robin match against Richmond, and there were heated arguments and fist-fights in the rooms after the match and after a post-match function later that evening, related to accusations of match fixing and receiving bribes.
- On the Saturday after the VFL grand final, Essendon (in its role as 1924 VFL premiers) was challenged by 1924 VFA premiers, Footscray, to a match in aid of Dame Nellie Melba's Limbless Soldiers' Appeal, purportedly (but not officially) for the championship of Victoria. Footscray unexpectedly defeated Essendon 9.10 (64) to 4.12 (36). Again there were accusations of match fixing, and champion centre half-back Tom Fitzmaurice was so disgusted with many of his teammates having, in his view, deliberately lost the match, he never played again for Essendon.
- The Seconds grand final, to have been staged between Geelong and minor premiers Essendon on 4 October, was originally scheduled to be played at Geelong's home ground, Corio Oval, but after Essendon raised its objections, the Seconds League rescheduled the match for Kardinia Park, which was a neutral venue, but still located in Geelong. Essendon again objected, and after the league dismissed their complaint, refused to travel to Geelong. Consequently, the match was scratched and the Seconds premiership was awarded to Geelong.

== Awards ==
- The 1924 VFL premiership team was Essendon.
- The VFL's leading goalkicker was Jack Moriarty of Fitzroy with 82 goals, a VFL record. (Moriarty had played 13 senior games for Essendon in 1922, and after playing in Essendon's Second Eighteen for 1923, and was released to Fitzroy).
- The winner of the 1924 (inaugural) Brownlow Medal was Edward "Carji" Greeves of Geelong with 7 votes.
- St Kilda took the wooden spoon in 1924.
- The Victorian Junior League grand final was scratched and the premiership was awarded to Geelong after minor premiers Essendon refused to travel to Geelong for the grand final (main: 1924 VJFL season)

== Sources ==
- 1924 VFL season at AFL Tables
- 1924 VFL season at Australian Football
