= 1924 Brownlow Medal =

Victorian Football League player award

- Date: 17 September
- Location: VFL Headquarters
- Winner: Edward 'Carji' Greeves(Geelong); 7 votes

The 1924 Brownlow Medal was the inaugural year the award was presented to the player adjudged the fairest and best player during the Victorian Football League (VFL) home and away season. Edward 'Carji' Greeves of the Geelong Football Club won the medal by polling seven votes during the 1924 VFL season.

== Creation ==
Charles Brownlow, a long-serving secretary and former captain of the Geelong Football Club, died on 23 January 1924. When the VFL committee met on 29 February 1924, the below motion moved by Collingwood Football Club secretary Ern Copeland was passed unanimously:

To perpetuate the memory of the late Charles Brownlow [for] his many years of most valuable service to the Australian game both as a player, Club Secretary, Delegate and Vice President of the League, and President of the Australasian Football Council, a gold and enamel medal of the value of £10 shall be presented annually by the League to the best and fairest player in premiership matches each season, the medal to be called the Brownlow Medal.

== Voting system ==
The voting system used in the 1924 Brownlow Medal was as follows:

- The field umpire awarded one vote to whom he adjudged the best player on the field.
- The player who finished with the most votes would be awarded the 1924 Brownlow Medal.
- In the event of a tie, the umpiring panel would meet and agree upon a winner among the tied players.

== Votes ==
=== Leading vote-getters ===
The following list shows the leading vote-getters for the 1924 Brownlow Medal. Edward 'Carji' Greeves was the winner, with George Shorten and Bert Chadwick runners-up.

| | Player | Votes |
|---|---|---|
| 1st | Edward Greeves, Jr. (Geelong) | 7 |
| =2nd | George Shorten (Essendon) | 6 |
| =2nd | Bert Chadwick (Melbourne) | 6 |
| 4th | Doug Hayes (Richmond) | 4 |
| =5th | Paddy O'Brien (Carlton) | 3 |
| =5th | Jack Moriarty (Fitzroy) | 3 |
| =5th | Arthur Pink (Geelong) | 3 |
| =5th | Mark Tandy (South Melbourne) | 3 |
| =9th | Maurie Beasy (Carlton) | 2 |
| =9th | Norm Beckton (Essendon) | 2 |
| =9th | Les Bryant (Fitzroy) | 2 |
| =9th | Jim Spain (Richmond) | 2 |
| =9th | Colin Watson (St Kilda) | 2 |
| =9th | Wels Eicke (St Kilda) | 2 |
| =9th | Jack O'Connell (South Melbourne) | 2 |
| =9th | Roy Cazaly (South Melbourne) | 2 |

Greeves' outstanding season is further outlined by the fact that he is one of the youngest players to win the award, aged just 20 years 312 days at the time.

Greeves' seven best-on-ground awards in just fourteen games played is another outstanding statistic. With vote inflation included (where 1 vote in 1924 equals 3 votes), Greeves is one of the most consistent vote-getters of all time, with an average of 0.81 votes per game throughout his 10-season career.

=== Team totals ===
The following list shows the teams whose players polled the most votes. Geelong topped the list with 11 votes, 7 of them made up by 'Carji' Greeves.

| | Team | Votes |
|---|---|---|
| 1st | Geelong | 11 |
| = 2nd | Richmond; Essendon | 10 |
| 4th | Fitzroy | 9 |
| 5th | South Melbourne | 8 |
| 6th | Melbourne | 7 |
| = 7th | St Kilda; Carlton | 6 |
| 9th | Collingwood | 5 |

The team that polled the most votes, Geelong, missed the 1924 VFL finals by two games, finishing 5th.

=== Leading vote-getters by team ===
The following list shows the players who topped their team for the most votes polled.

| Team | Player | Votes |
|---|---|---|
| Carlton | Paddy O'Brien | 3 |
| Collingwood | Syd Coventry; Reg Baker; Joe Poulter; Charlie Tyson; Gordon Coventry | 1 |
| Essendon | George Shorten | 6 |
| Fitzroy | Jack Moriarty | 3 |
| Geelong | Edward 'Carji' Greeves | 7 |
| Melbourne | Bert Chadwick | 6 |
| Richmond | Doug Hayes | 4 |
| South Melbourne | Mark Tandy | 3 |
| St Kilda | Colin Watson; Wels Eicke | 2 |

== Presentation ==
The Brownlow Medal was presented to the player at League Headquarters, without the fanfare, glitz and glamour of the award today.
