= Reuben Reid (Australian footballer) =

Australian rules footballer, born 1903

Personal information
- Full name: Reuben John Reid
- Nickname: Chum
- Born: 16 January 1903; Northdown, Tasmania
- Died: 31 July 1987 (aged 84); Caulfield South, Victoria
- Original team: Latrobe (NWFU], Tasmania
- Height: 185 cm (6 ft 1 in)
- Weight: 88 kg (194 lb)

Playing career^{1}
Years	Club	Games (Goals)
1924–26	Richmond	13 (1)
- ^{1} Playing statistics correct to the end of 1926.

Reuben John Reid (16 January 1903 – 31 July 1987) was an Australian rules footballer who played with Richmond in the Victorian Football League (VFL).

== Family ==
The son of John Reid (1852–1937), and Rhoda Reid (1873–1931), née King, Reuben John Reid was born at Northdown, Tasmania on 16 January 1903.

He married Dorothy Rubeena Francis Shepherd (1908–1983) in 1929. His grandson, Scott Anthony Reid (1967–2018), a lawyer, made considerable contribution to the development of Australian rules football in Papua New Guinea and in Samoa.

== Football ==
=== Richmond (VFL) ===
A Centre half-back, Reid was recruited from the Latrobe Football Club in Tasmania's North West Football Union. His career at Richmond was interrupted twice: by a three week suspension in 1924, and by a leg injury he sustained in the match against the Ararat Football Club of the Ballarat Football League at Ararat on 25 July 1925, which kept him out of the last six home-and-away games of the 1925 season.

=== 21 June 1924 ===
Following the rough, spiteful, and congested match against Carlton, at Princes Park, on 21 June 1924 — Richmond 5.8 (38) to Carlton's 3.19 (28) — Richmond's Donald Don was reported for charging Carlton's full-forward, Newton Chandler, Reid was reported for two offences, for charging Carlton's Horrie Clover, and for charging Carlton's Alex Duncan; and Alex Duncan was reported for three offences, for kicking Richmond's George Rudolph, for striking Reid, and for "making an offensive motion towards Boundary Umpire Johnson". The match report noted that "at times the game was little better than a scramble, the bumping heavy, and not always fair, and though three players have been reported, it would have occasioned no surprise if at least two others had to face the investigative tribunal".

The tribunal hearing took place on 26 June 1924, under the chairmanship of VFL President (and Carlton delegate) Walter Baldwin Spencer, assisted by the St Kilda delegate, Harry Duigan, and the former champion sprinter (100 yards in 10 seconds) and lawyer George Allen Moir. Don was disqualified for the rest of the season; Reid was disqualified for three games for charging Clover, and was exonerated of the offence of charging Duncan; and, to the astonishment of many, Duncan was found not guilty of all three charges.

=== Brunswick (VFA) ===
During the 1926 season he transferred to VFA side Brunswick. He later played and coached the Tramways team and worked as a tram driver.

== Death ==
He died at the Little Company of Mary Hospice in South Caulfield on 31 July 1987.
