= Thomas Hickey =

Thomas or Tom Hickey may refer to:

- Tom Hickey (actor) (1944–2021), Irish actor
- Tom "Bo" Hickey (born 1945), American football player who played for the Denver Broncos
- Tom Hickey (footballer, born 1901) (1901–1935), Australian rules footballer who played for Fitzroy
- Tom Hickey (footballer, born 1991), Australian rules footballer who plays for Sydney (formerly for Gold Coast, St Kilda and West Coast)
- Tom Hickey (hurler) (born 1975), Irish hurler
- Tom Hickey (politician) (1933–2020), politician in Newfoundland, Canada
- Thomas Hickey (ice hockey) (born 1989), Canadian professional ice hockey defenceman
- Thomas Hickey (painter) (1741–1824), Irish painter
- Thomas Hickey (soldier) (died 1776), executed for mutiny during the American Revolution
- Thomas J. Hickey (1930–2016), American politician in Nevada
- Thomas Francis Hickey (bishop) (1861–1940), Roman Catholic Bishop of Rochester
- Thomas Francis Hickey (general) (1898–1983), United States Army Lieutenant General
- Thomas "TJ" Hickey, Australian Aboriginal teenager whose death led to the 2004 Redfern riots
