= Jim Maxfield =

Australian rules footballer

Personal information
- Full name: James Vivian Maxfield
- Nickname: Snowy
- Born: 27 August 1893; Bendigo, Victoria
- Died: 23 August 1953 (aged 59); Parkville, Victoria
- Height: 163 cm (5 ft 4 in)
- Weight: 63 kg (139 lb)

Playing career^{1}
Years	Club	Games (Goals)
1915	Bendigo City (BFL)	3 (6)
1916	Training Units (AIF)	1 (1)
1920–1923	Morwell (CGFL)	35
1921	Northcote (VFA)	2
1924–25	Richmond	10 (2)
1926	Maffra (CGFL)	
1927–1930	Traralgon (CGFL)	

Coaching career^{3}
Years	Club	Games (W–L–D)
1926	Maffra (CGFL)	
1927	Traralgon (CGFL)	
- ^{1} Playing statistics correct to the end of 1930.^{3} Coaching statistics correct as of 1927.

Career highlights
- AIF Pioneer Exhibition Game, London, 28 October 1916; 1922 Morwell (CGFL) premiership team; 1923 Captain C.G.F.L. representative team; 1926 Maffra (CGFL) premiership captain-coach

James Vivian "Snowy" Maxfield (27 August 1893 – 23 August 1953) was an Australian rules footballer who played with Richmond in the Victorian Football League (VFL).

== Family ==
James Vivian Maxfield was born at Bendigo, Victoria, on 27 August 1893. He married Kathleen Ursula O'Rourke in 1924.

== Education ==
He was educated at the Marist Brothers' College in Bendigo.

== Military service ==
He enlisted in the First AIF in February 1916, and served overseas, returning to Australia in June 1919.

== Football ==
=== Bendigo City (BFL) ===
A talented local footballer in the Newbridge district, in 1915, he played three matches with the Bendigo City Football Club in the Bendigo Football League.

=== Training Units (AIF) ===
He played for the (losing) Australian Training Units team in the famous "Pioneer Exhibition Game" of Australian Rules football, held in London, in October 1916. He was one of the team's best players, he scored one of its four goals.

=== Morwell (CGFL) ===
He played with the Morwell Football Club, in the Central Gippsland Football League (CGFL), for four seasons (1920-1923).

=== Northcote (VFA) ===
In 1921, he played two games with the VFA club Northcote.

=== Richmond (VFL) ===
on 28 May 1924, he was granted a clearance from Morwell to Richmond, and he played his first senior match, against St Kilda, at the Punt Road Oval, on 31 May 1924.

Having played well in his first three matches, he was omitted from the Richmond side that met Carlton, at Princes Park, on 21 June 1924, on the grounds of that he was (allegedly) injured. Within days, however, it became clear that he had been stood down (i.e., rather than being "omitted"), due to Richmond's concerns in relation to the status of the clearance that Maxfield had been granted a month earlier.

==== Maxfield's VFL permit cancelled ====
On 25 June 1924, both the Richmond Football Club's Secretary, Percy Page, and Maxfield attended the VFL's Permit and Umpire Committee meeting.

In his presentation to the meeting, Page revealed that it had been brought to his attention over the preceding week that, rather than coming to Richmond as a free agent from the "unallotted territory" of Morwell, Maxfield "had played two games with Northcote in 1921"; and that, as soon as he [Page] became aware of that fact, he had communicated with the Northcote club, and had obtained a clearance for Maxfield (the clearance had been subsequently endorsed by the VFA); and that, on those grounds, "[Page] asked that the League should put the matter in order by granting Maxfield a permit".

In response, the VFL secretary, E.L. Wilson, "pointed out that in evidence given by Maxfield when his permit was granted [a month earlier], [Maxfield] had said that he had played at Morwell and Traralgon for four years, and had not played with any other club".

Giving evidence in support of his application, Maxfield stated that he had been "on holiday from Morwell" at the time of his two matches with Northcote, that he had obtained a clearance from Northcote back to Morwell at the time, and that "he had no intention of deceiving the League … when asked [a month earlier] when he got his permit", and had simply "forgotten about it".

In conclusion, the chairman, Mr. R. Hunt, noting that the committee "did not consider the explanation [offered by Maxfield] satisfactory", refused the application for a permit and, as well, suspended Maxfield indefinitely.

"After deliberating, the chairman of the committee said the committee had decided to cancel the clearance previously granted Maxfield to Richmond, and to refuse the application [for a new permit that had been] under consideration that night. In addition, it had decided that under a rule of the League Maxfield should be "suspended during the pleasure of the umpire and permit committee"."

Notwithstanding the fact that the Permit Committee's decision was final, and that there was no means through which an appeal could be made, Richmond attempted to bring the matter before the committee's consideration, once again, three weeks later. The committee refused to re-open the case. Although unable to play any further for Richmond in 1924, Maxfield continued to train with the Richmond team.

==== Maxfield's VFL permit restored ====
On 1 April 1925, Maxfield and the Richmond secretary, Percy Page, attended a meeting of the VFL's Permit and Umpire Committee. Page informed the committee that Maxfield wanted to present his case in person for the lifting of his disqualification. The committee "decided that it was not necessary to hear [Maxfield]", "went into committee to discuss the matter" and, "after a long discussion … decided to take no action"; and, as a consequence, Maxfield remained disqualified.

On 20 May 1925, and just before the fourth round of the 1925 VFL season, Percy Page, attended yet another meeting of the VFL's Permit and Umpire Committee and re-opened Maxfield's case, arguing that, because "Maxfield had now missed 15 matches, it was considered by the Richmond club that he had been adequately punished"; the committee considered the application "in private", and its chairman, Mr. R. Hunt, "announced that the disqualification would stand".

At the 3 June 1925 meeting of the VFL's Permit and Umpire Committee Maxfield's case "was again discussed, and it was decided to permit him to apply in another month for reinstatement". Maxfield lodged his application for reinstatement on 1 July 1925, and at the committee's 8 July 1925 meeting, and "without any discussion", and after having been disqualified for 21 matches, Maxfield's request to have his suspension lifted was granted.

He was immediately selected to play in Richmond's First XVII against North Melbourne, at the Arden Street Oval, on 11 July 1925, his first game since 14 June 1924.

=== Maffra (CGFL) ===
In 1926, he was captain-coach of Maffra in the Central Gippsland Football League (CGFL). Maffra won the 1926 premiership.

=== Traralgon (CGFL) ===
In 1927, he was captain-coach of the Traralgon Football Club in the Central Gippsland Football League (CGFL). He played with the club for four seasons, only one as captain-coach, and retired from football at the end of the 1930 season.

== Athlete ==
He was a talented sprinter who did not begin running competitively until he was nearly 30.

On 26 February 1927, he won the 130-yard 1927 Sale Gift, running off 12 yards, narrowly beating the favourite, champion sprinter Tim Banner.

== Death ==
He died at Parkville, Victoria on 23 August 1953.

== See also ==
- Confusion over "[14] Maxfield", of Fremantle (in 1916 Exhibition match programme) at "Talk:1916 Pioneer Exhibition Game"
