= Arthur Pink (footballer) =

Australian rules footballer (1900–1986)

Personal information
- Full name: Arthur John Pink
- Born: 15 November 1900; Beeac, Victoria
- Died: 5 June 1986 (aged 85); Geelong, Victoria
- Original team: Newtown
- Height: 169 cm (5 ft 7 in)
- Weight: 65 kg (143 lb)

Playing career^{1}
Years	Club	Games (Goals)
1923–1925	Geelong	34 (22)
- ^{1} Playing statistics correct to the end of 1925.

Arthur John Pink (15 November 1900 – 5 June 1986) was an Australian rules footballer who played with Geelong in the Victorian Football League (VFL).

== Football ==
Pink, who was born in Beeac, went to Geelong High School and was recruited from the Newtown Football Club.

A lightly built rover, Pink started his Geelong career in 1923 when he played 15 league games. This included Geelong's semi final loss to Fitzroy, during which he received a knock to the head that left him temporarily unconscious. He was given the award for Geelong's best junior player at the club awards that October.

Pink appeared in all 16 games Geelong played in the 1924 VFL season. Towards the end of the season he was a VFL representative at the Hobart Carnival and was named amongst the state's best players in a win over Western Australia, with four goals. He polled three votes in the 1924 Brownlow Medal, which were enough to finish equal fifth.

A knee injury sustained in the opening round of the 1925 season kept Pink out of the team until round 13, a win over Richmond. The following week, against St Kilda at Junction Oval, Pink again injured his knee. The club doctor gave Pink the unfortunate news that the knee cartilage was damaged so badly his football career was over.

== War service ==
Pink volunteered for part time service in the Volunteer Defence Corps during World War II, serving for three years in the Geelong area.
