= Geelong College =

The Geelong College

Location
- Newtown, Victoria; Australia; 38°9′5″S 144°20′18″E

Information
- Type: Independent, co-educational, day and boarding, Christian school
- Motto: Latin: Sic itur ad astra (Thus one goes to the stars)
- Denomination: in association with the Uniting Church
- Established: 1861; 165 years ago
- Founder: Alexander James Campbell
- Chairman: Richard Page
- Principal: Simon Young
- Chaplain: Stephen Wright
- Gender: Co-educational
- Enrolment: 1,200–1,300 (K–12)
- Colour
- Affiliation: Associated Public Schools of Victoria
- Alumni: Old Geelong Collegians
- Website: www.geelongcollege.vic.edu.au

The Geelong College is an Australian independent and co-educational, Christian day and boarding school located in Newtown, an inner-western suburb of Geelong, Victoria.

Established in 1861 by Alexander James Campbell, a Presbyterian minister, the Geelong College was formerly a school of the Presbyterian Church of Australia and is now operated in association with the Uniting Church in Australia but is not governed or managed by the church. The school has a non-selective enrolment policy and currently caters for over 1,200 students from kindergarten to Year 12, including around 100 boarding students from Years 7 to 12. The boarding students are accommodated in two boarding houses at the senior school campus: Mackie House for boys, Mossgiel House for girls.

The college is affiliated with the Headmasters' and Headmistresses' Conference, the Association of Heads of Independent Schools of Australia, the Junior School Heads Association of Australia, the Association of Independent Schools of Victoria, the Australian Boarding Schools Association, and has been a member of the Associated Public Schools of Victoria since 1908.

== History ==
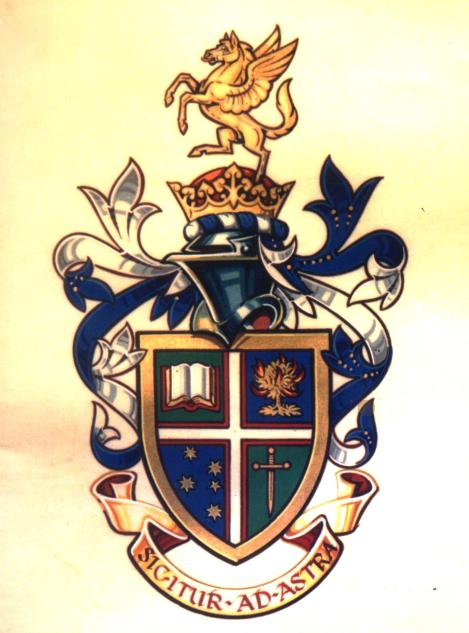
Early version of the college crest

Following the closure of the first Geelong Grammar, Campbell established a committee to found a new Presbyterian school. On 8 July 1861, Geelong College was officially established. The school year later started with an enrolment of 62. George Morrison was appointed the first principal and three years later became the owner of the school. The school moved to its present location in 1871. The architects Alexander Davidson and George Henderson designed its main building.

In 1908, the college returned to the ownership of the Presbyterian Church of Australia and became a member of the Associated Public Schools of Victoria (APS). St David's Presbyterian Church at the corner of Talbot St and Aphrasia St, Newtown is currently used by the School for religious services. Traditionally, the school used St George's Presbyterian Church on Latrobe Terrace for Presbyterian Services. Anglican services, when required, were provided at All Saints Church on Noble St. Presbyterian Services however, were transferred to St David's Church in 1962. The Geelong College Chapel was dedicated on 8 March 1989 as the centre of the school's spiritual life. It was formerly the school's House of Music, designed by Philip Hudson, built c. 1936 and opened in 1937.

Land was acquired in 1946 for a new preparatory campus, which did not open until 1960. This particular campus became co-educational in 1974, with co-education being extended to the senior campus in 1975. The college undertook an extensive redevelopment and refurbishment of the middle school, which is on the preparatory campus, in 2012. In 2015, Principal Andrew Barr resigned after he was photographed watching adult pornography in his office.

== Principals ==
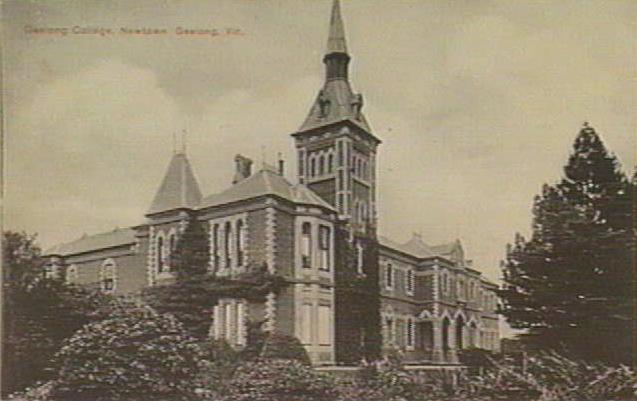
The college building in 1906

Period	Principal
1861–1898	G. Morrison
1898–1909	N. Morrison
1910–1914	W. R. Bayly
1915–1919	W. T. Price
1920–1945	F. W. Rolland
1946–1960	M. A. Buntine
1960–1975	P. N. Thwaites
1976–1985	S. P. Gebhardt
1986–1995	A. P. Sheahan
1996–2012	P. C. Turner
2013–2015	A. M. Barr
2016–2025	P. D. Miller
2025–present	S. Young

== Campuses ==
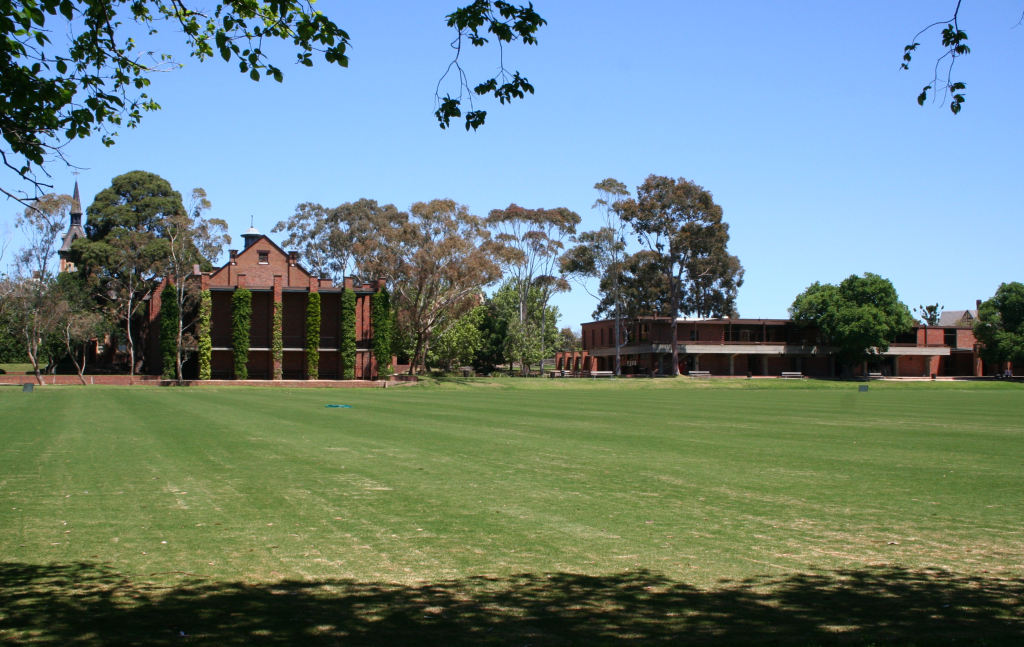
Main oval at the senior school

- Senior School – Years 9 to 12

Talbot Street, Newtown

- Middle School – Years 4 to 8

Aberdeen Street, Newtown

- Junior School – Kindergarten to Year 3

Minerva Road, Newtown

- Cape Otway Campus – all years

Cape Otway (since 2015)

== Curriculum ==
Geelong College offers its senior students the Victorian Certificate of Education (VCE).

The Geelong College VCE results 2012-2020
Year	Rank	Median study score	Scores of 40+ (%)	Cohort size
2012	46	34	18.1	276
2013	49	34	17.0	254
2014	58	34	15.1	234
2015	46	34	18.7	280
2016	53	34	17.8	263
2017	49	34	19.1	243
2018	65	33	15.2	230
2019	63	33	16.3	246
2020	85	32	13.0	254

== Sport ==
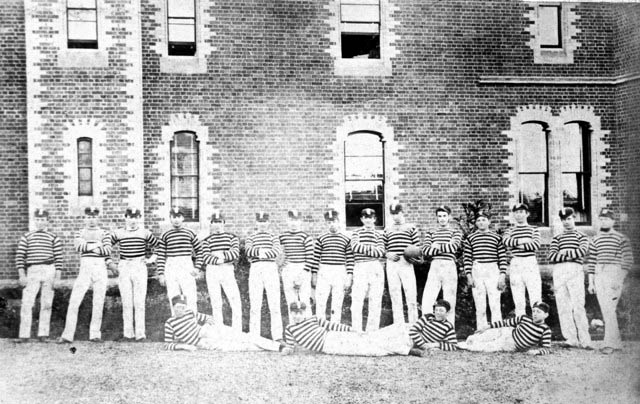
Geelong College football team, 1878

Secondary students of the college participate in the summer, winter and spring seasons of the Associated Public Schools of Victoria (APS)/Associated Grammar Schools of Victoria (AGSV) sport competition. Choices offered for summer sports include badminton, cricket (boys only), softball (girls only), tennis and rowing. Winter sports include Australian rules football (boys only), netball (girls only), soccer and basketball. Students may also participate in a number of local competitions and the college is particularly known for rowing competitions.

=== APS and AGSV/APS premierships ===
Geelong College has won the following APS and AGSV/APS premierships:

Boys:

- Cricket (7) – 1946, 1947, 1963, 1979, 1982, 1995, 2011
- Football (6) – 1925, 1927, 1932, 1963, 1964, 2006
- Rowing (13) – 1936, 1944, 1955, 1956, 1957, 1959, 1960, 1976, 1990, 1993, 2000, 2001, 2003

Girls:

- Athletics (5) – 1995, 1998, 1999, 2002, 2005
- Hockey (2) – 1995, 1996
- Netball (4) – 1993, 1994, 1996, 1998
- Rowing (10) – 1981, 1982, 1983, 1989, 1992, 1999, 2002, 2003, 2006, 2011
- Tennis (6) – 1995, 1996, 1999, 2002, 2004, 2005

== Geelong College Challenge ==
The Geelong College Challenge is a competition run by the college at the preparatory school campus in which government schools in the region can enter. The challenge started in 1993. Participating schools send in an entry based on the set theme, and the teams with the 16 best entries are accepted. These schools then form a team of four Year 6 students (two boys and two girls). On the weekend of the challenge, the teams participate in various challenges, which include art, music, drama, technology, information technology, physical education and mathematics challenges.

== Notable alumni ==
Alumni of the school are known as Old Geelong Collegians and may elect to join the alumni association, the Old Geelong Collegians' Association (OGCA). Some notable Old Geelong Collegians include:

=== Academic ===
- Sir Robert Honeycombe – scientist and metallurgist, emeritus Professor of Metallurgy at Cambridge University, UK.
- John Marden – first headmaster of the Presbyterian Ladies' College, Sydney (1888–1919) and Pymble Ladies' College (1916–1919); pioneer of women's education; Presbyterian elder

=== Business ===
- Bill Dix – former managing director of Ford Australia and Chairman of Qantas
- Don Kendell – founder of Kendell Airlines

=== Entertainment, media and the arts ===
- Russell Boyd – cinematographer: Picnic at Hanging Rock, Gallipoli, Crocodile Dundee.
- John Duigan – film director and writer
- Gideon Haigh – journalist and author
- Robert Ingpen – artist, writer and illustrator
- Rebecca Maddern – journalist
- Veronica Milsom – comedian and triple j radio presenter
- George Ernest Morrison – Australian adventurer; correspondent for The Times Peking (Beijing)
- Guy Pearce – actor
- Sean Sowerby – journalist
- Nathan Templeton – journalist

=== Medicine and science ===
- Sir Frank Macfarlane Burnet – biologist and winner of the Nobel Prize for Medicine

=== Politics, public service and the law ===
- Lionel Aingimea – President of Nauru since 2019
- John Button – senior Federal Minister in the Hawke and Keating Governments
- Sir Arthur Coles – retail founder, MP, Lord Mayor of Melbourne; first Chairman of Australian National Airlines (TAA)
- Robert Doyle – Lord Mayor of Melbourne, politician; Member for Malvern in the Legislative Assembly (1992–2006); Leader of the Victorian Opposition (2002–2006)
- Major General Sir James Harrison, KCMG, CB, CBE – former Governor of South Australia
- Sarah Henderson, MP – Member for Corangamite (Liberal Party) from 2013 to 2019, Senator for Victoria since 2019
- Barry James Maddern – Australian barrister and jurist
- Fergus Stewart McArthur, MP – Member for Corangamite (Liberal Party) from 1984 to 2007
- Sir Gordon Stewart McArthur – Liberal Party politician, President of the Victorian Legislative Council (1958–1965), grazier and barrister
- James Nimmo CBE – public servant

=== Religion ===
- Thomas Henry Armstrong – first Bishop of Wangaratta

=== Sport ===
- Tom Atkins – AFL footballer for Geelong
- Jaxson Barham – AFL footballer for Collingwood
- Alec Boswell Timms – VFA footballer for Geelong and Scottish international rugby union player from 1896 to 1905
- Tim Callan – AFL footballer for the Western Bulldogs
- Alex Cincotta- AFL footballer for Carlton
- David A. Clarke – AFL footballer for Geelong and Carlton
- David E. Clarke – AFL footballer for Geelong and Carlton
- Georgie Clarke – Olympian (athletics)
- Tim Clarke – former AFL footballer for Hawthorn
- Richard Colman – Paralympic athletics gold medallist
- Ayce Cordy – AFL footballer for the Western Bulldogs
- Zaine Cordy – AFL footballer for the Western Bulldogs; premiership player in the 2016 AFL Grand Final
- Ed Curnow – current AFL footballer for Carlton
- Charlie Curnow – current AFL footballer for Carlton
- Josh Dunkley-Smith – 2012 Olympic rowing silver medallist
- Edward 'Carji' Greeves – winner of the inaugural Brownlow Medal for the best and fairest player in the Victorian Football League (later known as AFL) (1924)
- Lindsay Hassett – captain of the Australian Test cricket team from 1949 to 1953
- John "Jack" Bailey Hawkes – Australian tennis champion
- Lachlan Henderson – current AFL footballer for Geelong
- Steve Horvat – Australian international soccer player
- Jack Iverson – Australian Test cricketer
- Charlie Lazzaro – AFL footballer for North Melbourne
- Bowen Lockwood – AFL footballer for Port Adelaide
- Ned McHenry – AFL footballer for Adelaide
- Edward Russell Mockridge – dual gold medallist for cycling at the 1952 Summer Olympics
- David Ramage – two-time Olympic rower
- Ian Redpath – Australian Test cricketer
- Josh Saunders – former AFL footballer for St Kilda
- Will Schofield – former AFL footballer for the West Coast Eagles
- Paul Sheahan – Australian Test cricketer; former headmaster of The Geelong College and Melbourne Grammar School
- Alex Witherden – AFL footballer for the Brisbane Lions and West Coast Eagles
- Mason Wood – AFL footballer for North Melbourne and St Kilda

== See also ==
- Geelong Grammar School
- List of schools in Victoria
- List of boarding schools
