= Senator Hickey (disambiguation) =

Joe Hickey (1911–1970) was a U.S. Senator from Wyoming from 1961 to 1962. Senator Hickey may also refer to:

- Jimmy Hickey Jr. (born 1966), Arkansas State Senate
- Martin Hickey (fl. 2020s–present), New Mexico State Senate
- Theodore M. Hickey (1910–1993), Louisiana State Senate
- Thomas J. Hickey (1930–2016), Nevada State Senate
- Vivian Hickey (1916–2016), Illinois State Senate
- William F. Hickey Jr. (1929–2016), Connecticut State Senate
- William J. Hickey (1873–1953), New York State Senate
