= Jack Barnett =

Jack Barnett may refer to:

- Jack Barnett (baseball) (1879–1923), American baseball player
- Jack Barnett (footballer) (1899–1979), Australian rules footballer
- Jack Barnett (politician) (1869–1945), full name John "Jack" Septimus Barnett, deputy mayor of Christchurch from 1938 to 1941
- John Barnett (rugby) (1881–1918), known as Jack, Australian rugby union and rugby league player
- Jack Barnett, member of the English band These New Puritans
