= St David's Uniting Church, Newtown =

Uniting church in Newtown, Victoria, Australia

St David's Uniting Church
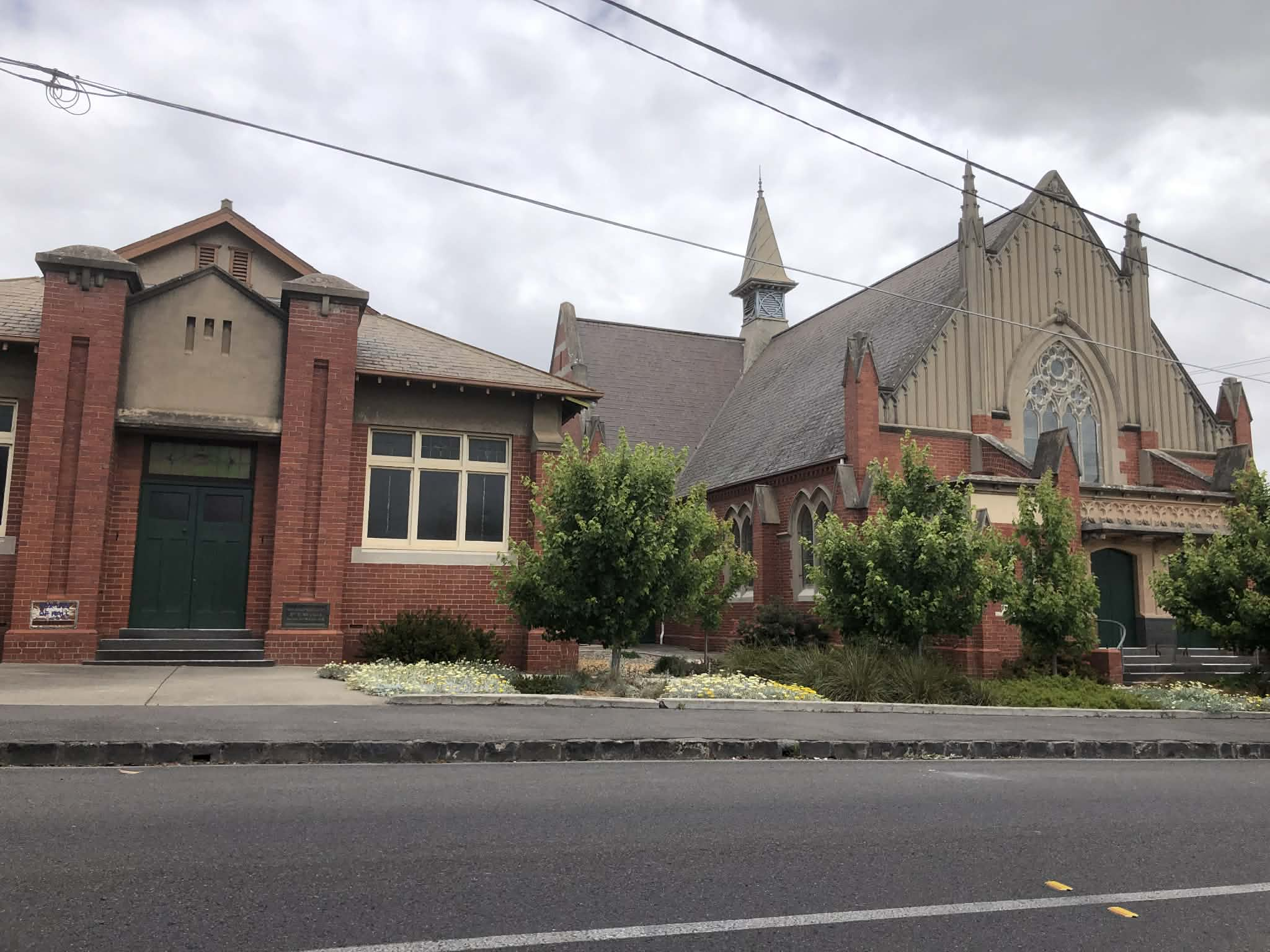
- St David's Uniting Church, Newtown, Victoria, Australia
- St David's Uniting Church
- 38°9′2″S 144°20′26.9″E
- Address: 43 Aphrasia Street, Newtown, Victoria
- Country: Australia
- Denomination: Uniting (since 1977)
- Website: https://newtownuniting.org/

History
- Former name: St David's Presbyterian Church
- Founded: 1914

Architecture
- Architect(s): Dew Brothers & Ebbels
- Architectural type: Church
- Style: Federation Gothic

Administration
- Parish: Barrabool

St David's Uniting Church is a historic Uniting Church congregation and church building located in the corner of Aphrasia Street and Talbot Street in Newtown, a suburb of Geelong, Victoria, Australia. Built on the site of an earlier 1850s church to serve the growing Presbyterian community in Newtown, the church has remained an active place of worship and community gathering for over a century, since 1914. The building is recognised for its architectural character, and it is listed on the Victorian Heritage Register.

== History ==
The roots of St David's Church lie in the development of a Presbyterian congregation in Newtown from 1851. Little is known about records of the original church. The foundation stone for the present church was laid on 28 February 1914 by Reverend Arthur Davidson, marking the beginning of construction. Later that same year, the congregation formally moved into the new premises, moving from the sold-off Ryrie Street Presbyterian Church.

The church was constructed in a Federation Gothic or Decorated Gothic style, typical of early 20th-century ecclesiastical architecture in Victoria. The design reflects the stylistic preferences of the time, with Gothic-inspired elements suited to a suburban Protestant congregation. It was built by local builders Dew Brothers & Ebbels, based on plans prepared by the local architects Laird and Buchan, who were responsible for a number of prominent buildings in the region.

In 1916, the church hall was erected adjacent to the main building, with its foundation stone laid by Reverend C. Neville, providing space for Sunday School activities and community functions.

Throughout the 20th century, the church maintained close links with The Geelong College, an adjacent independent school with Presbyterian heritage. From the early 1960s, Presbyterian services for college students and staff were regularly held at St David's, following the transfer of religious services from the older St George's Presbyterian Church to the Newtown church in 1962.

With the formation of the Uniting Church in Australia in 1977, St David's Presbyterian Church became part of the new Uniting Church denomination.
