= Geelong Arts Centre =

Performing arts venue in Geelong, Victoria, Australia

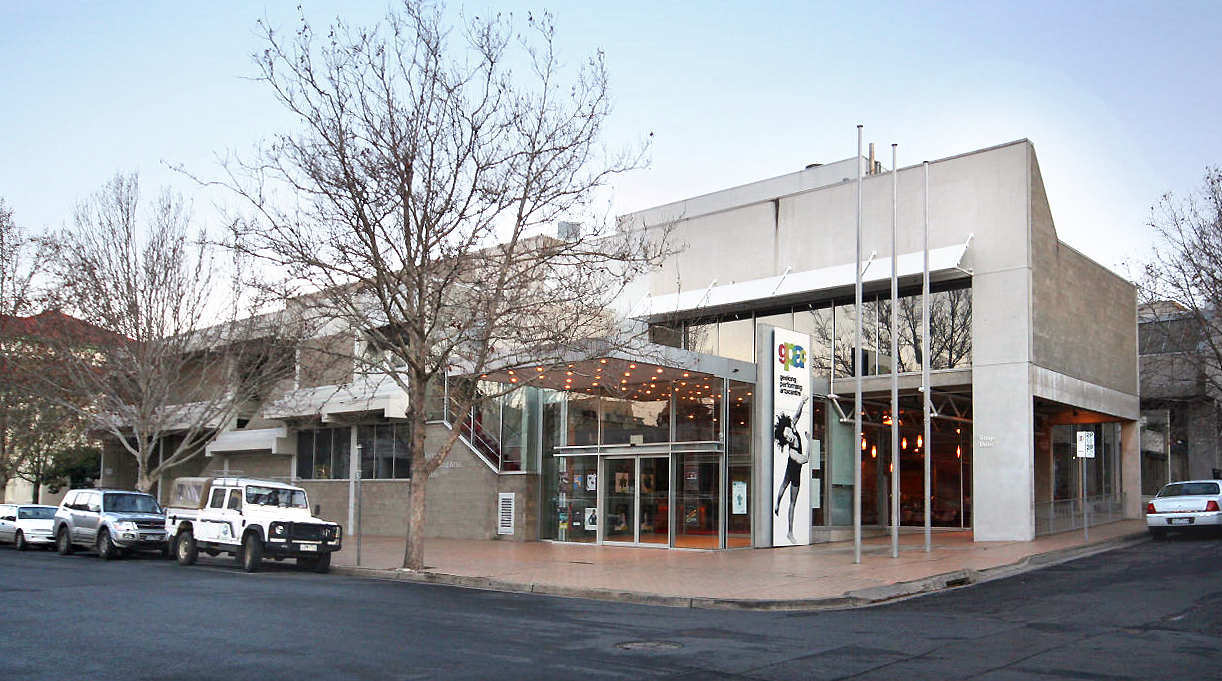
- Little Malop Street entry to the Geelong Performing Centre
- Interactive map of Geelong Arts Centre
- Former names: Geelong Performing Arts Centre
- Address: 50 Little Malop Street, Geelong VIC 3220
- Coordinates: 38.1474°S 144.3544°E
- Operator: Geelong Performing Arts Centre Trust
- Capacity: 797 (The Playhouse); 325 (Drama Theatre)
- Type: Performing arts centre
- Events: Theatre, musical theatre, comedy, classical music, ballet and dance

Construction
- Groundbreaking: 1978
- Opened: 1981
- Renovated: 2017-2023

Website
- geelongartscentre.org.au

Geelong Arts Centre, formerly the Geelong Performing Arts Centre (GPAC), is a performing arts, functions, and events venue located in Geelong, Victoria, Australia. The complex is located between Little Malop and Ryrie Streets in central Geelong, and comprises a number of venues. It also hosts Creative Engine, a sector of the organisation that runs programs such as Community Fuel.

== History ==
Proposals for a performing arts centre in Geelong were first made in the 1970s. The site chosen had a number of existing buildings on it:

=== Temperance hall ===
A temperance hall was located on the corner of Little Malop Street and Aitchison Place. It was erected in 1858/59, the foundation stone being laid on 15 November 1858. This distinctive conservative classical building with Barrabool freestone facade, ornate central parapet entablature supported on Tuscan Doric pilasters and matching entrance portal was designed by an unknown architect for the Geelong Total Abstinence Society. The hall was later used as a grammar school in 1864. The hall was demolished in 1978 to enable the construction of GPAC. The stones were numbered and put into storage for future rebuilding, the current location being unknown.

=== Mechanics' Institute ===
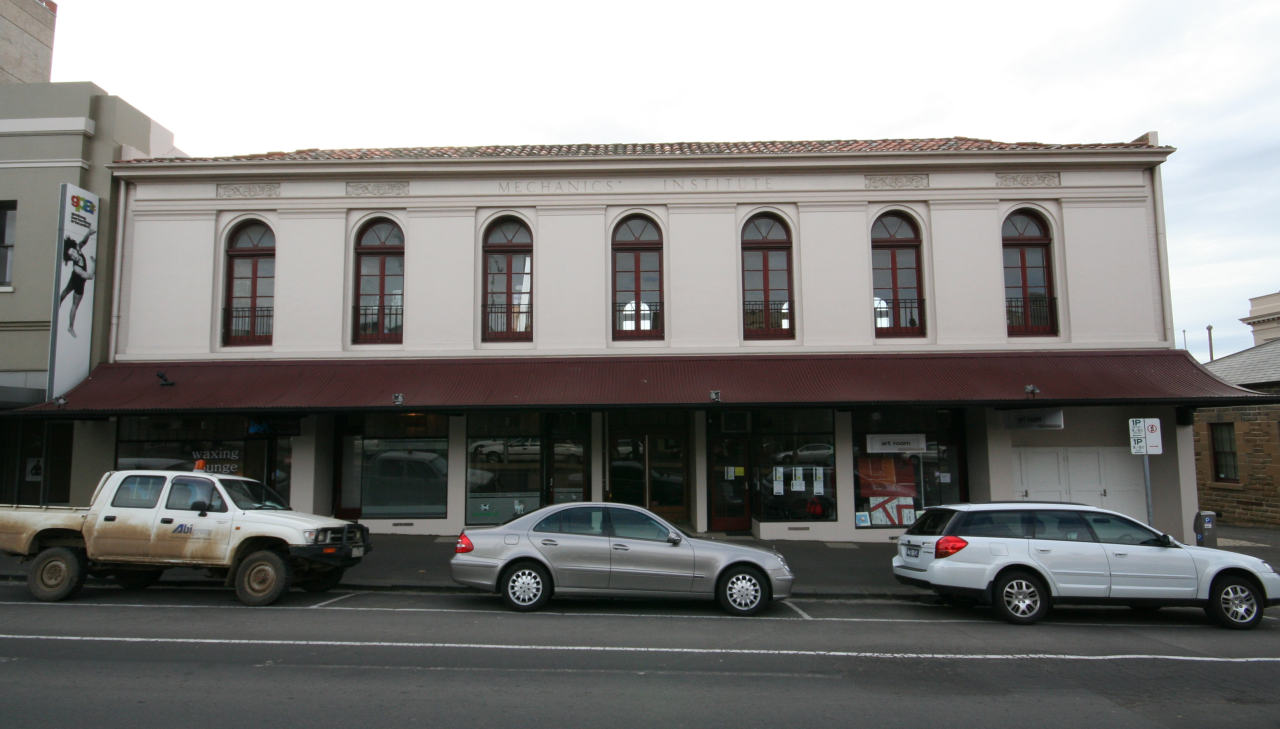
Mechanics Institute building on Ryrie Street, 2007

A meeting was held in 1842 to investigate the opening of a Mechanics' Institute in Geelong. The first building was opened in 1846, with a new building opening on the current site on Ryrie Street on March 3, 1856. At some point the building gained a 2nd storey, before it was destroyed by fire in 1926. A new hall was built on site, and was known as the Plaza Theatre. The facade of this building was retained in GPAC.

=== Steeple Church ===
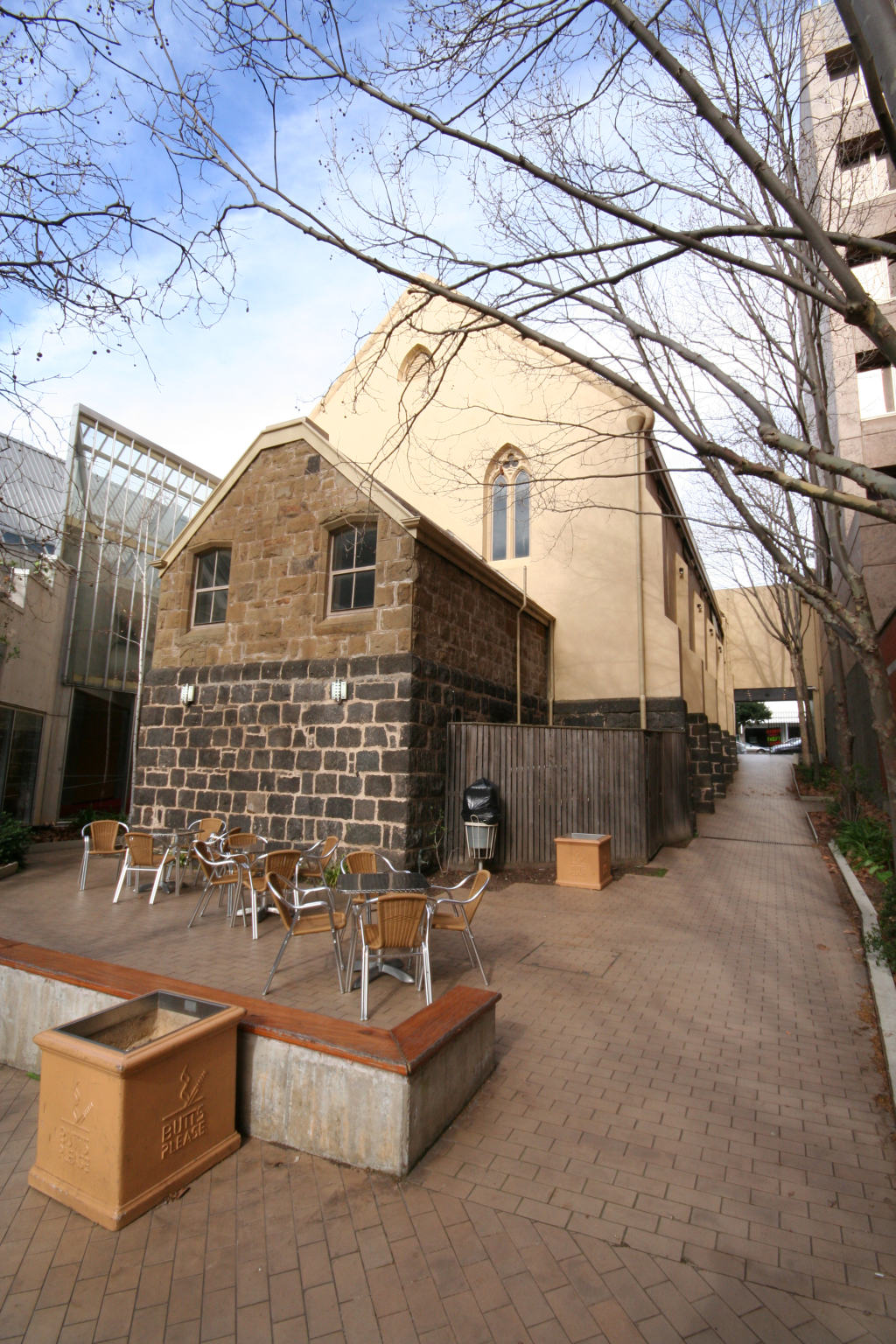
Rear of the former 'Steeple Church', 2007

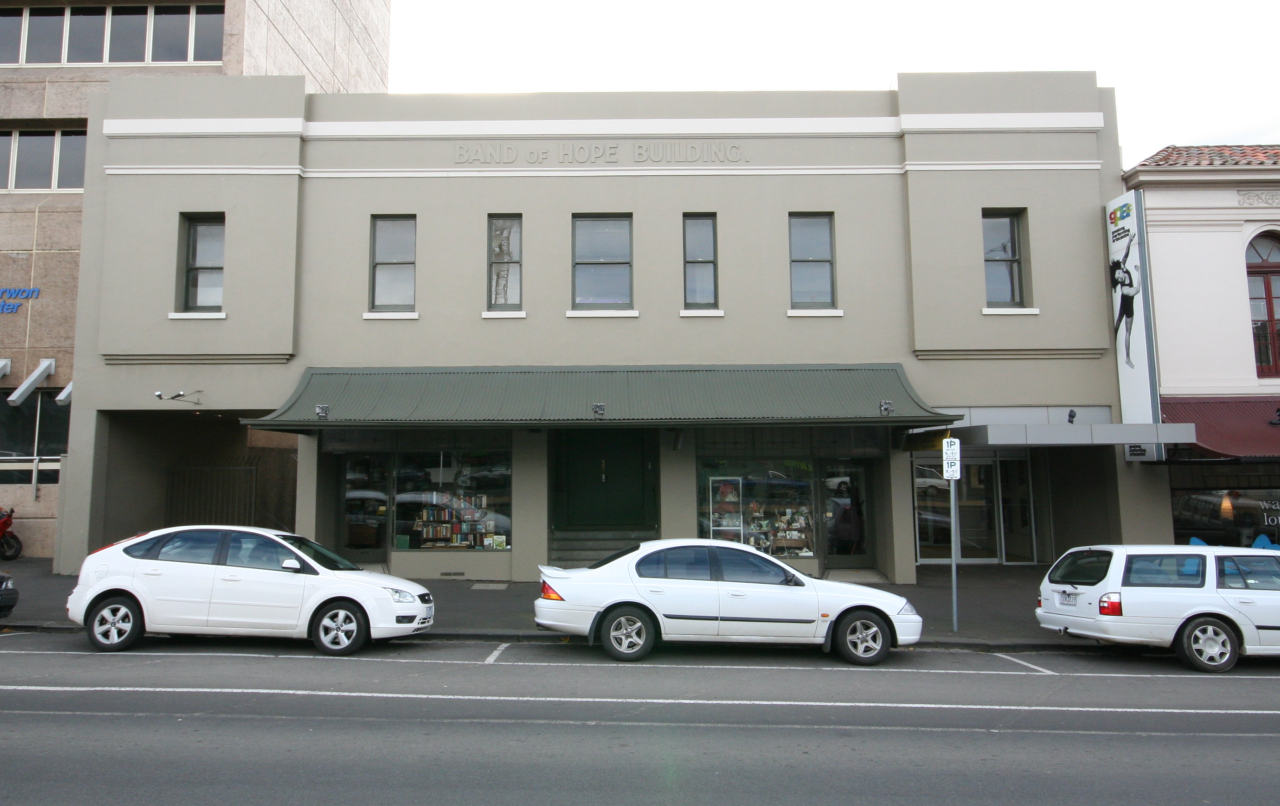
Band of Hope building on Ryrie Street, formerly the 'Steeple Church', 2007

The Ryrie Street Presbyterian Church opened in 1857, and was known as the 'Steeple Church'. It was designed by John Young in 1856 and built in bluestone in an Early English Gothic style. In 1914 the congregation moved to Newtown and became St. David's Presbyterian Church. The steeple was dismantled in 1913, and the present row of two-storey shops along Ryrie Street were built, although the main body of the church still exists today as part of the performing arts centre.

=== Arts centre ===
Construction of the centre commenced in 1978 with the demolition of the Temperance Hall. The centre was designed in a Brutalist style with exposed concrete. It was officially opened in 1981.

Geelong Performing Arts Centre is a statutory authority and was established by the Geelong Performing Arts Centre Trust Act 1980 (No. 9406).

=== Redevelopments ===
The Geelong Performing Arts Centre has undergone redevelopments, including physical changes to their entertainment spaces, including new theatres, public buildings and hospitality and branding changes, including renaming the centre to Geelong Arts Centre.

Some of its venues have been temporarily closed during a redevelopment of the Little Malop Street building, with the project funded to the tune of A$140 million, and scheduled to be completed in late 2023. ARM Architecture is principal architect on the project, with Lendlease appointed by the Victorian Government to lead the delivery of the project.

With the completion of the redevelopment, there will be a 500-seat theatre, 250-seat theatre, and black box theatre. There will be more facilities for the general public, including an outdoor atrium and more restaurants, and the new building will have an office and other administration facilities.

== Sponsorship ==
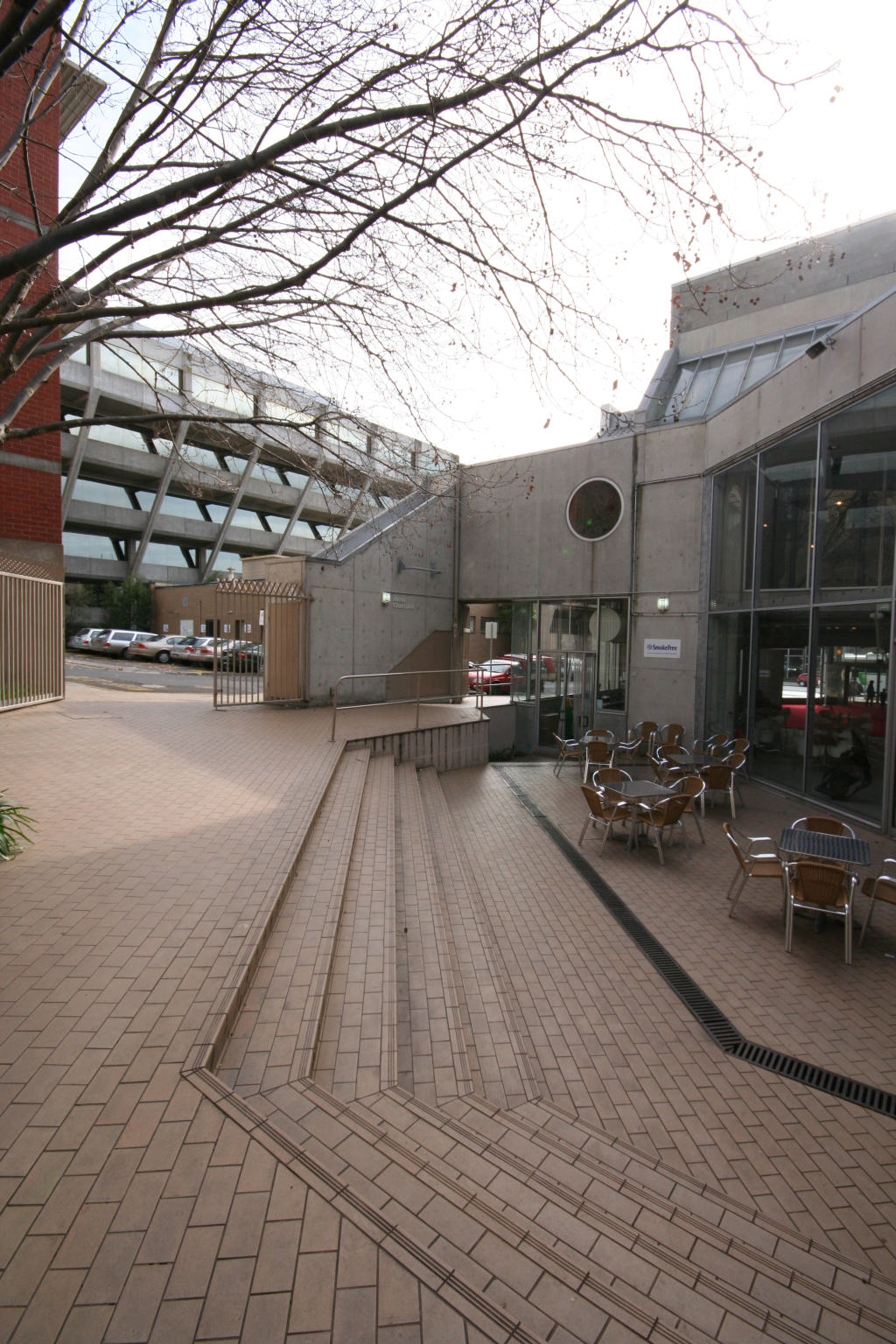
Alcoa Courtyard

In order to raise funds for the construction of the centre corporate sponsorship was sought. A number of Geelong companies pledged funds and had sections of the centre named after them. The main theatre was named after major sponsor Ford. The second theatre was named after Blakistons, a local transport company; the main foyer after Shell; and the courtyard after Alcoa.

Sponsors of 2021 include:

- Government partner: Creative Victoria
- Major artistic partner: Deakin University
- Innovation partner: Costa Hall Asset Management
- Family magic program partner: Geelong Connected Communities

== Description and governance ==
The Geelong Arts Centre is a state-owned cultural agency that receives funding through the financial assistance of the Victorian Government through Creative Victoria. The complex is located between Little Malop and Ryrie Streets in central Geelong, and comprises a number of venues.

The original arts centre consisted of a number of separate venues:

- The Playhouse (known as Ford Theatre until 2011): 797 seat proscenium arch theatre with dress circle and fly tower.
- Drama Theatre (known as Blakiston Theatre until 2011): 325 seat studio-style theatre.
- Alcoa Studio: 20.5m x 10m dance studio with a sprung floor, stage and mirrors, located in the former Steeple Church
- Ballet Studio 2: 15m x 9m dance studio with a sprung floor, ballet bars and mirrors, located in the upstairs area of the former Mechanics' Institute

The centre is managed by the members of the Geelong Performing Arts Centre Trust, which was established under the Geelong Performing Arts Centre Trust Act 1980. The trust is comprised by persons nominated by the local councils; experienced in the fields of education, business administration, finance or the performing arts; or having an active interest and leadership role in the performing arts.

Other venues include:

=== Costa Hall ===
Costa Hall is located on Gheringhap Street and is part of the Deakin University's Waterfront Campus. It has a capacity of 1397 in a seated concert auditorium layout, and contains an orchestra pit, stalls, choir stalls, side balconies and a central balcony. Costa Hall also features a bar and box office within the foyer. It has hosted a variety of live entertainment including the orchestra, comedy acts, circus arts and musical theatre.

=== Ryrie Street ===
- Studio 1: Multipurpose Studio Space with a 30-person capacity
- Studio 2: Multipurpose Studio Space with a 30-person capacity
- Studio 3: Small rehearsal space with a 30-person capacity
- Studio 4: Rehearsal and Performance Studio Space, hosting multiple productions from the Geelong Arts Centre's theatre season, with a capacity of 120 patrons under general admission

== Programs ==
=== Theatre season ===
Geelong Arts Centre has an annual theatre season curated by the organisation.

=== Parrwang Community Arts ===
"Connecting with culture & creativity" is the youth arts program for the local Aboriginal and Torres Strait Islander community. Most of the programs are targeted at the youth but are all-ages inclusive. The name comes from the Wadawurrung language for magpie.

Workshops have included Short Black Opera, Extraordinary Artists, National Reconciliation Week, Geelong Arts Centre's Reconciliation Action Plan, The Australian Ballet Dance Workshop and NAIDOC Week.

=== Creative Engine ===
Creative Engine is on level 2 of the Ryrie Street building. Known as a collaborative space for local creatives. This includes their networking events such as Spark Starter and Community Fuel which aim to promote local arts programs within the community. There are also Grants & Supports Initiative available

== Workplace ==
Roles beyond the trust include administration, marketing, human resources, operational and hospitality teams within the entertainment sector.

In June 2021, it was reported that Geelong Arts Centre had 88 total employees or 33 full-time equivalent (FTE). Of those 88 staff, 22 were full-time, 11 were part-time and 55 were fixed-term casual.
