= Ernest Taylor =

Ernest Taylor may refer to:

- Ernest Taylor (Australian rules footballer) (1898–1980), played for the Richmond Football Club between 1920 and 1926
- Ernie Taylor (footballer, born 1925) (1925–1985), English footballer with Newcastle United, Blackpool, Manchester United and Sunderland
- Ernie Taylor (footballer, born 1871) (1871–1944), English footballer with Southampton
- Ernest Taylor (rugby union) (1869–?), English rugby union footballer and captain of the national side
- Sir Ernest Taylor (Royal Navy officer) (1876–1971), British Royal Navy officer and politician
- Mervyn Taylor (artist) (Ernest Mervyn Taylor, 1906–1964), New Zealand engraver, commercial artist and publisher
