= Len Gale =

Australian rules footballer

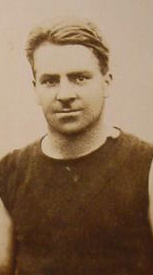

Personal information
- Full name: Leonard George Gale
- Born: 18 April 1897; Hawthorn
- Died: 25 June 1948 (aged 51); Fitzroy, Victoria
- Height: 168 cm (5 ft 6 in)
- Weight: 70 kg (154 lb)

Playing career^{1}
Years	Club	Games (Goals)
1920–1924	Fitzroy	58 (54)
- ^{1} Playing statistics correct to the end of 1924.

Leonard George "Len" Gale (18 April 1897 – 25 June 1948) was an Australian rules footballer who played with Fitzroy in the Victorian Football League (VFL).

Gale was one of many present and future footballers who fought in World War I. He enlisted with the Australian Army on 24 April 1917 and on November of that year embarked for overseas deployment. After serving as a Gunner with the 7th Field Artillery Brigade, Gale returned home in 1919.

His football career was delayed by the war, but he would make his VFL debut in 1920, as a 23-year-old. Gale, who worked as a potter, played his football as a rover. He was a rover in Fitzroy's 1922 premiership team, but started the game in a forward pocket. The following year he kicked 26 goals, to finish second in the Fitzroy goal-kicking. He would likely have kicked more if not for a six-week suspension that he received in round 16, for attempting to strike St Kilda's fullback Bill Cubbins. This cost him a spot in the 1923 VFL Grand Final, which Fitzroy lost to Essendon.

He looked to have played his last game for Fitzroy when he left for Horsham in 1924, as playing coach. However, Gale returned for the 1924 VFL finals series and appeared in two semi finals. He was then made captain-coach of Echuca in 1925.

Gale served his country again in World War II, enlisted in 1942 and being discharged in 1944.

He died on 25 June 1948 at St Vincent's Hospital, from injuries sustained in a hit and run accident the previous night in Kew.
