= Fred Wimbridge =

Australian rules footballer

Personal information
- Full name: Fredrick John Wimbridge
- Born: 9 March 1893; Broomehill, Western Australia
- Died: 4 December 1977 (aged 84); Perth, Western Australia
- Height: 188 cm (6 ft 2 in)
- Weight: 82 kg (181 lb)
- Position: Utility

Playing career^{1}
Years	Club	Games (Goals)
1911–16, 1919, 1928–29	Perth	105
1920–1924	West Perth	47 (56)
1925	South Melbourne	8 (12)
- ^{1} Playing statistics correct to the end of 1929.

Fredrick John "Fred" Wimbridge (9 March 1893 – 4 December 1977) was an Australian rules footballer who played in the West Australian Football League (WAFL) and with South Melbourne in the Victorian Football League (VFL).

== Family ==
The son of David Arthur Wimbridge (1860–1926), and Eliza Wimbridge (1863-1934), née Gorman, Fredrick John Wimbridge was born at Broomehill, Western Australia on 9 March 1893.

He married Robina Vera Millikan (1898–1959) on 10 August 1920.

== Football ==
Wimbridge started his career at Perth and was their leading goal-kicker in 1915 when he kicked 36 goals.

He then spent two seasons away from the League on war service but returned to Perth in 1919.

The following year he joined West Perth and topped their goal-kicking in 1921 with 30 goals. Despite playing as a forward that season, he made two appearances for Western Australia at the Perth Carnival as a fullback. He represented Western Australia on one further occasion.

He was already 32 when he made his way to South Melbourne, with whom he would play eight games in the 1925 VFL season. His best performance was a five-goal haul in a win over Footscray at Lake Oval.

After two years playing elsewhere in Victoria, Wimbridge returned to his original club Perth. He participated in the 1928 and 1929 seasons and then retired, having played 105 games for Perth.

== Military service ==
He enlisted in the First AIF in October 1916, served overseas, and returned to Australia in June 1919.

== Bravery award ==
Wimbridge was awarded a Bronze Medal by the Royal Humane Society of Australasia in 1925, for conspicuous bravery when he risked his life in assisting the eventual rescue of four women from drowning.

The four women, none of whom could swim, had been swept out to sea by the strong undertow of a rip at a beach in Mandurah, south of Perth, on Sunday, 23 March 1924. Three men were involved in the rescue: Wimbridge, Arthur Donald Lakeman (1896-1924), and Redvers Henry Buller Huxtable (1899-1985). Lakeman drowned in the process of the rescue; one of the four women rescued was his wife, another was his sister.

== Death ==
He died at Perth, Western Australia on 4 December 1977.

== See also ==
- 1921 Perth Carnival
