= Ryrie Street Presbyterian Church =

Former Presbyterian church in Victoria, Australia

- Steeple Church
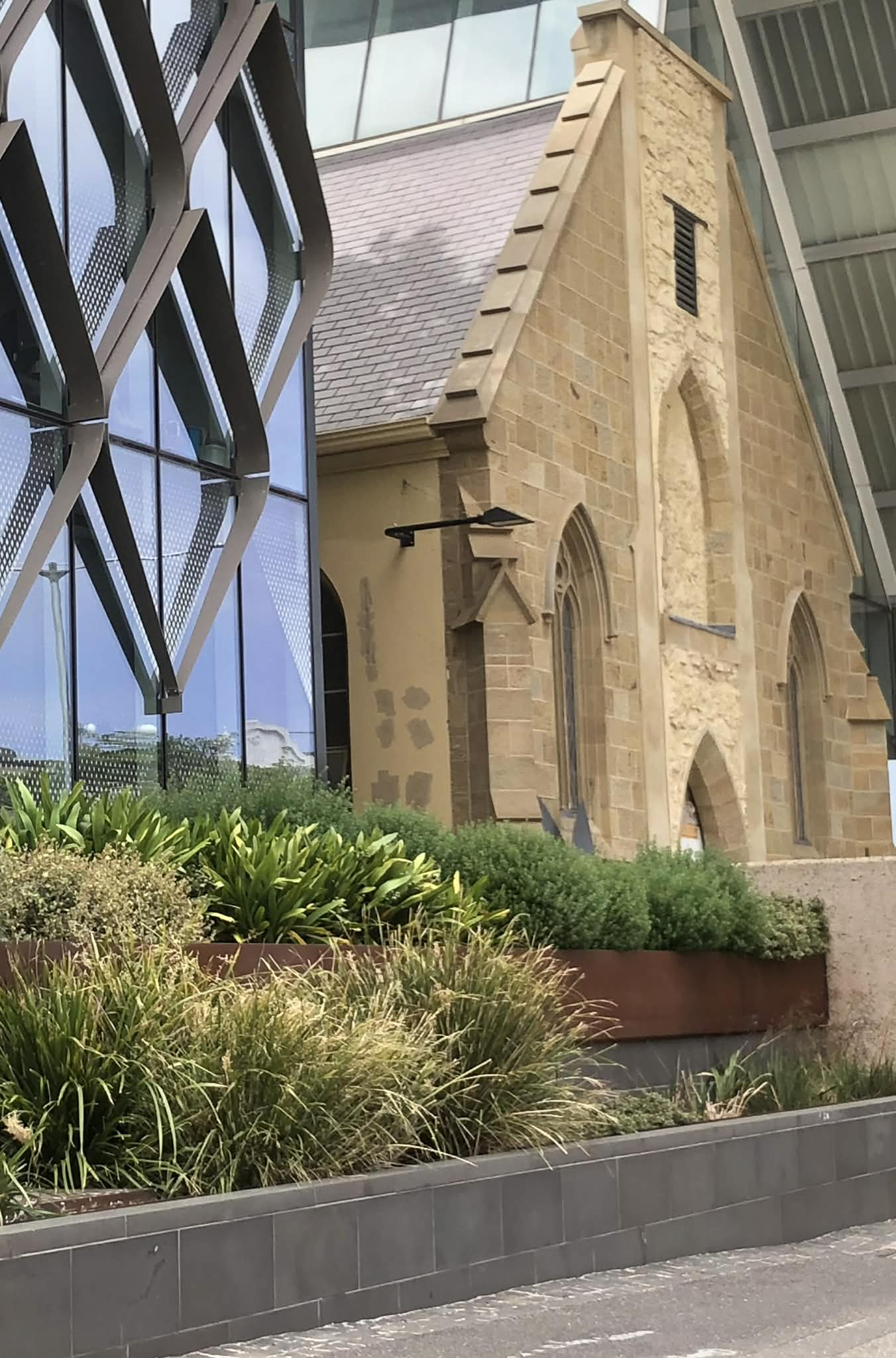
- Ryrie Street Presbyterian Church
- Ryrie Street Presbyterian Church
- 38°08′53″S 144°21′22″E
- Location: 73 Ryrie Street, Geelong, Victoria
- Country: Australia
- Denomination: Presbyterian

History
- Status: Closed

Architecture
- Architect: John Young
- Architectural type: Church
- Style: Gothic Revival
- Years built: 1856-1857
- Completed: 1857
- Closed: 1914

Ryrie Street Presbyterian Church, also known as the Steeple Church, was a Presbyterian church located in Geelong, Victoria, Australia. The church opened in 1857, and closed in 1914, with the building later being absorbed into the Geelong Arts Centre.

== History ==
The United Presbyterians first congregated in 1851 in the masonic hall. An under-construction church that the congregation had begun in McKillop Street was destroyed in a storm, and it was decided to move to the Mechanics Institute in Ryrie Street. The church was constructed between 1856-1857 adjacent to the Mechanics Institute. As the numerous Presbyterian churches in the Geelong city centre began to reunite, the decision was made to sell the church to the Band of Hope Union in 1914. The steeple was pulled down, and shops built along the frontage of Ryrie Street. With the congregation subsequently moving to St David's Presbyterian Church, Newtown. The church building has since become part of the Geelong Arts Centre.

== See also ==
- Geelong Arts Centre
