= Ernest Taylor (Australian rules footballer) =

Australian rules footballer

Personal information
- Full name: Ernest William Taylor
- Born: 10 June 1898; Richmond, Victoria
- Died: 23 November 1980 (aged 82); Camberwell, Victoria
- Original team: Burnley
- Height: 180 cm (5 ft 11 in)
- Weight: 82 kg (181 lb)

Playing career^{1}
Years	Club	Games (Goals)
1920–1926	Richmond	58 (2)
- ^{1} Playing statistics correct to the end of 1926.

Career highlights
- Richmond Premiership Player 1920, 1921

Ernest William Taylor (10 June 1898 – 23 November 1980) was an Australian rules footballer who played in the VFL between 1920 and 1926 for the Richmond Football Club.

== Family ==
The son of the former Richmond (VFA) captain, Charles Henry Taylor (1872–1951), and Annie Ethel Maud Taylor (1877–1938), née Mitchell, Ernest William Taylor was born at Richmond, Victoria on 10 June 1898.

He married Amelia Jane Comans (1896–1927) in 1920. He married his second wife, Mary Evelyn "Mae" Grace (1908–1991), in 1932.

== Football ==
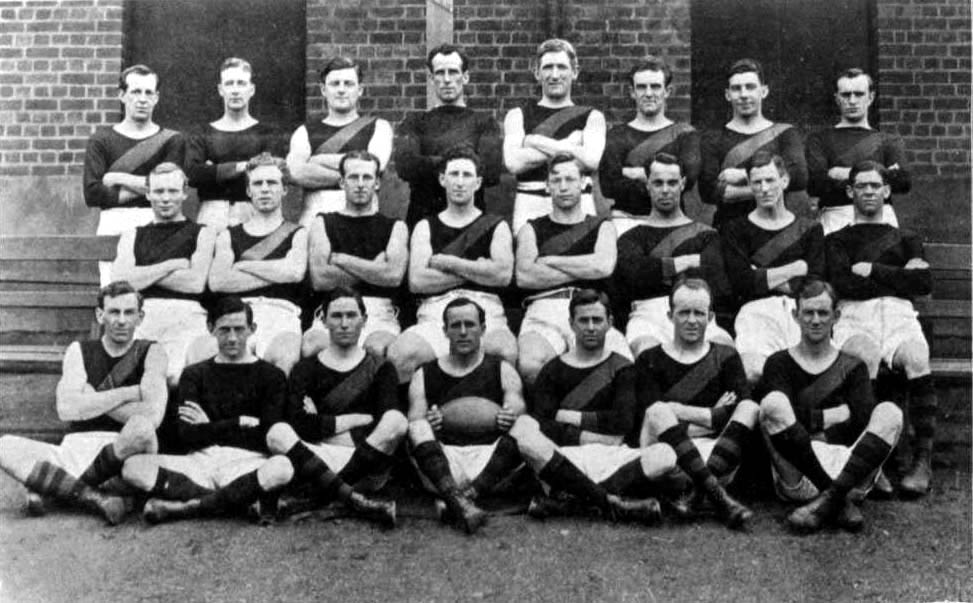
Richmond's 1920 Premiership Team: Taylor, extreme right, back row.

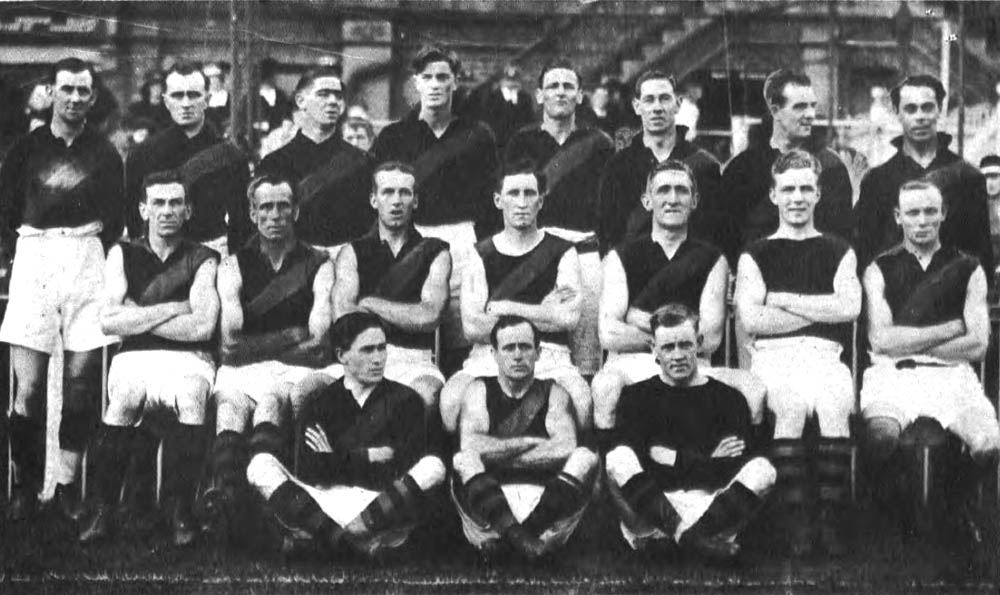
Richmond's 1921 Premiership Team: Taylor, second from left, back row.

A back-pocket and half-back flanker, he was recruited from the Burnley Football Club, and made his senior debut with Richmond against South Melbourne, at the Lake Oval, on 14 August 1920.

In his fifth First XVIII match he played in the back pocket for Richmond in its 1920 Grand Final win over Collingwood, 7.10 (52) to 5.5 (35). In his seventeenth match he played in the back-pocket for Richmond in its 1921 Grand Final win over Carlton, 5.6 (36) to 4.8 (32).

In what was thought, at the time, to be his last game for Richmond, he played in the back-pocket for Richmond against South Melbourne, at Windy Hill, on 13 September 1924 as part of the VFL's one-year-only experiment with a "round-robin tournament" in place of the regular "Argus system". He was badly injured during the last quarter of the match, and was in hospital for a number of weeks. South Melbourne's Bill Condon was charged with elbowing Taylor; however, due to the severity of Taylor's injury (fractured skull and two facial fractures), the hearings were controversially suspended for a considerable time, with, eventually, the case being dismissed on the grounds of the considerable delay raising doubts about the reliability of the participants' recall of the events in question.

After retiring as a player Taylor served on the Richmond Football Club Committee between 1925 and 1936, and then later in 1941 and 1942, being elected vice president in 1935 and 1936.

Although he had declared his retirement, following his 1924 injuries, at the beginning of the 1925 season, he went on to play another four senior games — two in 1925, and two in 1926 — to help Richmond out when it was short of players.

== Death ==
He died at Camberwell, Victoria on 23 November 1980.
