= Harold Mahony (footballer) =

Australian rules footballer

Personal information
- Full name: Harold Roy Mahony
- Born: 24 August 1900; Geelong, Victoria
- Died: 14 March 1973 (aged 72); Nunawading, Victoria
- Original team: South District
- Height: 173 cm (5 ft 8 in)
- Weight: 65 kg (143 lb)

Playing career^{1}
Years	Club	Games (Goals)
1924–1926	South Melbourne	18 (14)
- ^{1} Playing statistics correct to the end of 1926.

Harold Roy Mahony (24 August 1900 – 14 March 1973) was an Australian rules footballer who played with South Melbourne in the Victorian Football League (VFL).
