= Harry Duigan =

Australian rules footballer

Personal information
- Full name: Henry Mcleod Black Duigan
- Born: 24 December 1875; Richmond, Victoria
- Died: 6 August 1931 (aged 55); Caulfield, Victoria
- Height: 180 cm (5 ft 11 in)
- Weight: 72 kg (159 lb)
- Position: Half forward

Playing career^{1}
Years	Club	Games (Goals)
1897–98	St Kilda	8 (1)
- ^{1} Playing statistics correct to the end of 1898.

Henry Mcleod Black Duigan (24 December 1875 – 6 August 1931) was an Australian rules footballer who played with St Kilda in the Victorian Football League (VFL).
