= Charlie Farrell (footballer) =

Australian rules footballer and coach

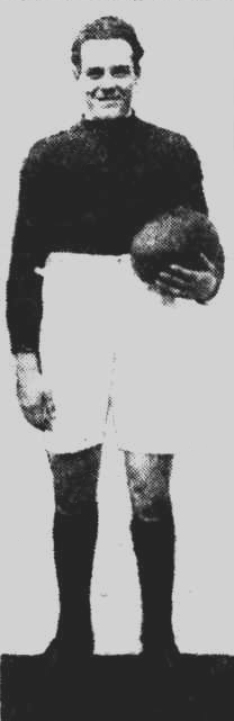

Personal information
- Full name: Charles James Farrell
- Born: 28 June 1898; Footscray, Victoria
- Died: 14 March 1972 (aged 73); Seddon, Victoria
- Original team: Williamstown Juniors
- Height: 178 cm (5 ft 10 in)
- Weight: 74 kg (163 lb)
- Position: Half back flank

Playing career^{1}
Years	Club	Games (Goals)
1919–25	Essendon	69 (20)
- ^{1} Playing statistics correct to the end of 1925.

Charles James "Chooka" Farrell (28 June 1898 – 14 March 1972) was an Australian rules footballer who played for Essendon in the Victorian Football League (VFL).

Farrell was a half back flanker, recruited from Williamstown Juniors. He represented the VFL interstate team in both 1921 and 1922. Farrell missed out on a spot in the 1923 VFL Grand Final, despite participating in the finals series, but was an Essendon premiership player in 1924.

Farrell was captain-coach of St. Patrick's Football Club when they won the 1926 Ovens & Murray Football League premiership.

He later captain-coached Yarraville in the Victorian Football Association (VFA).
