= Charlie Nicholls =

Australian rules footballer

Personal information
- Full name: Lester Cecil Nicholls
- Born: 11 September 1899; Geelong, Victoria
- Died: 20 November 1944 (aged 45); Melbourne, Victoria
- Height: 183 cm (6 ft 0 in)
- Weight: 83 kg (183 lb)
- Position: Defence

Playing career^{1}
Years	Club	Games (Goals)
1923–27	South Melbourne	56 (10)
- ^{1} Playing statistics correct to the end of 1927.

Lester Cecil "Charlie" Nicholls (11 September 1899 – 20 November 1944) was an Australian rules footballer who played with South Melbourne in the Victorian Football League (VFL).
