= Bob McDonald (Australian footballer) =

Australian rules footballer

Personal information
- Full name: Bob McDonald
- Born: 14 December 1895
- Died: 1 July 1979 (aged 83)
- Height: 175 cm (5 ft 9 in)
- Weight: 70 kg (154 lb)

Playing career^{1}
Years	Club	Games (Goals)
1921–24	South Melbourne	33 (4)
- ^{1} Playing statistics correct to the end of 1924.

Bob McDonald (14 December 1895 – 1 July 1979) was an Australian rules footballer who played with South Melbourne in the Victorian Football League (VFL).
