= Les Woodfield =

Australian rules footballer

Personal information
- Full name: Les Woodfield
- Born: 27 August 1899
- Died: 1 April 1974 (aged 74)
- Height: 179 cm (5 ft 10 in)
- Weight: 80 kg (176 lb)

Playing career^{1}
Years	Club	Games (Goals)
1921–22	Essendon	15 (15)
1923–27	South Melbourne	76 (11)
Total		91 (26)
- ^{1} Playing statistics correct to the end of 1927.

Les Woodfield (27 August 1899 – 1 April 1974) was a former Australian rules footballer who played with Essendon and South Melbourne in the Victorian Football League (VFL). Woodfield commenced playing with Williamstown in the VFA in 1920 and played in the last 13 games of the season from rounds 6–18. He then transferred to the Bombers in 1921 (after initially attracting interest from South Melbourne but he was residentially bound to Essendon) before returning to Williamstown during 1922 after four games that season with Essendon. He played just one game with 'Town against Port Melbourne in round 12 and then crossed to South Melbourne in 1923 and went on to play 76 games and kick 11 goals up until the end of 1927. Woodfield played a total of 14 senior games and kicked two goals with Williamstown.
