= Joe H. Harrison =

Australian rules footballer, born 1903

Joe Harrison

Personal information
- Full name: Joseph Henry Harrison
- Born: 6 March 1903; Collingwood, Victoria
- Died: 10 June 1960 (aged 57); Hawthorn, Victoria
- Original team: Collingwood Districts
- Height: 178 cm (5 ft 10 in)
- Weight: 80 kg (176 lb)

Playing career^{1}
Years	Club	Games (Goals)
1923–25	Richmond	19 (1)
- ^{1} Playing statistics correct to the end of 1925.

Joseph Henry Harrison (6 March 1903 – 10 June 1960) was an Australian rules footballer who played with Richmond in the Victorian Football League (VFL).
