= Newton Chandler =

Australian rules footballer

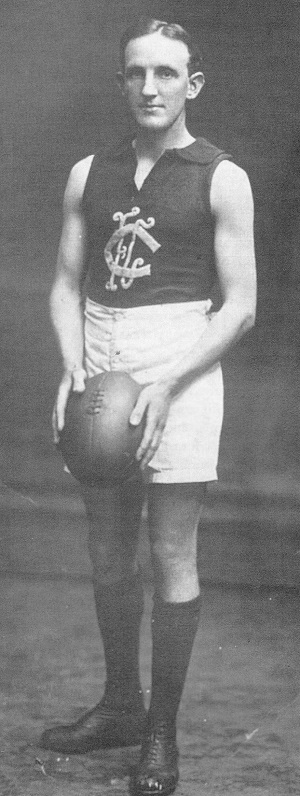
- Chandler in 1921

Personal information
- Born: 19 September 1893; Euroa, Victoria, Australia
- Died: 24 March 1997 (aged 103); Melbourne, Victoria, Australia
- Original team: Brunswick Football Club
- Height: 175 cm (5 ft 9 in)
- Weight: 73 kg (161 lb)
- Position: Forward

Playing career^{1}
Years	Club	Games (Goals)
1919–1924	Carlton	69 (11)
- ^{1} Playing statistics correct to the end of 1924.

Newton Chandler (19 September 1893 – 24 March 1997) was an Australian rules footballer who played with Carlton in the Victorian Football League (VFL) from 1919 until 1924.

== Biography ==
Chandler was a member of the Brunswick Football Club prior to being recruited to Carlton at the age of 19, but his debut for the team was delayed by the onset of World War I. He played a total of 69 games, including the 1921 VFL Grand Final, where his team lost to Richmond. After retiring from active competition in 1924, he served as the club's secretary (1934–1939, 1956), vice-president (1940–1943), and treasurer (1944–1958). His long life – he lived to the age of 103 – and dedication to the club earned him the nickname "The Grand Old Man of Carlton".
