= Bobby Allison (footballer) =

Australian rules footballer

Personal information
- Full name: Robert Allison
- Born: 3 December 1895; Albert Park, Victoria
- Died: 19 November 1948 (aged 52); Glen Iris, Victoria
- Original team: Port Melbourne
- Height: 168 cm (5 ft 6 in)
- Weight: 65 kg (143 lb)
- Position: Forward

Playing career^{1}
Years	Club	Games (Goals)
1920–21, 1923–26	South Melbourne	54 (81)
- ^{1} Playing statistics correct to the end of 1926.

Robert Allison (3 December 1895 – 19 November 1948) was an Australian rules footballer who played with South Melbourne in the Victorian Football League (VFL).
