= Ted O'Meara =

Australian rules footballer (1903–1941)

Personal information
- Full name: Edward Patrick O'Meara
- Born: 26 March 1903; Toongabbie, Victoria
- Died: 1 August 1941 (aged 38); East Melbourne, Victoria
- Original team: Leopold Football Club (MJFA)
- Height: 178 cm (5 ft 10 in)
- Weight: 68 kg (150 lb)

Playing career^{1}
Years	Club	Games (Goals)
1924–1926	South Melbourne	13 (15)
- ^{1} Playing statistics correct to the end of 1926.

Edward Patrick O'Meara (26 March 1903 – 1 August 1941) was an Australian rules footballer who played with South Melbourne in the Victorian Football League (VFL).

== Family ==
The son of Cornelius O'Meara (1853-1944), and Mary O'Meara (1866-1940), née O'Sullivan, Edward Patrick O'Meara was born at Toongabbie, Victoria 26 March 1903.

== Football ==
Recruited from the Leopold Football Club in the Metropolitan Junior Football Association (MJFA).

== Death ==
He died at East Melbourne, Victoria on 1 August 1941.
