= George Valentine (footballer) =

Australian rules footballer

Personal information
- Full name: George Heinrich Valentine
- Born: 20 June 1899; Long Gully, Victoria
- Died: 24 December 1980 (aged 81); Mitcham, Victoria
- Original team: Williamstown
- Height: 173 cm (5 ft 8 in)
- Weight: 76 kg (168 lb)

Playing career^{1}
Years	Club	Games (Goals)
1924–26	Richmond	24 (4)
1927–28	Footscray	8 (0)
Total		32 (4)
- ^{1} Playing statistics correct to the end of 1928.

George Heinrich Valentine (20 June 1899 – 24 December 1980) was an Australian rules footballer who played with Richmond and Footscray in the Victorian Football League (VFL).
