= Gordon Hislop =

Australian rules footballer (1901–1985)

Personal information
- Full name: David Gordon Hislop
- Born: 1 June 1901; Swan Hill, Victoria
- Died: 12 September 1985 (aged 84); Tasmania
- Original team: Balmain
- Height: 180 cm (5 ft 11 in)
- Weight: 83 kg (183 lb)

Playing career^{1}
Years	Club	Games (Goals)
1923–24	Richmond	22 (0)
- ^{1} Playing statistics correct to the end of 1924.

David Gordon Hislop (1 June 1901 – 12 September 1985) was an Australian rules footballer who played with Richmond in the Victorian Football League (VFL).

Hislop died in Tasmania on 12 September 1985.
