= St George's Presbyterian Church, Geelong =

Presbyterian church in Victoria, Australia

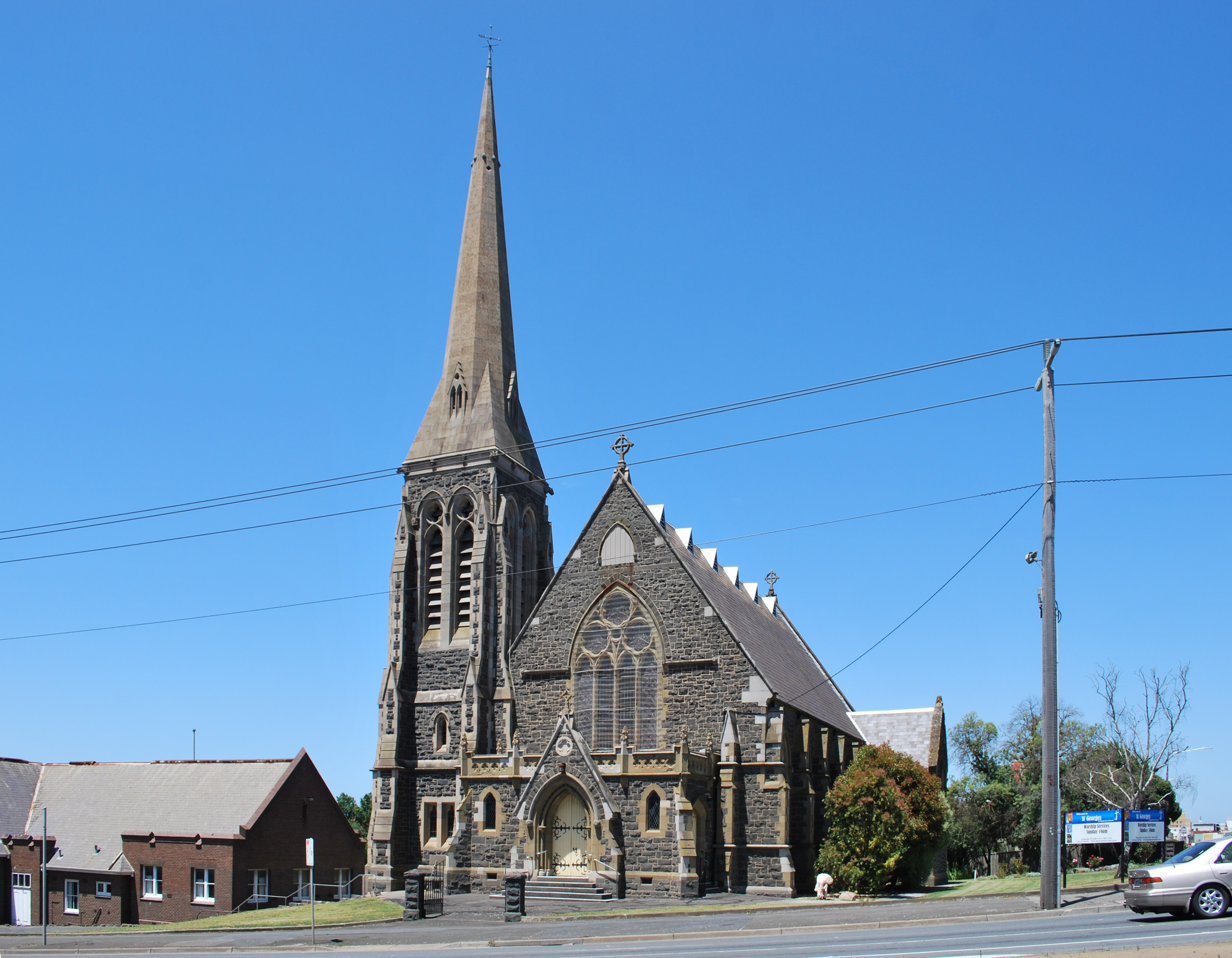
- St George's Presbyterian Church
- St George's Presbyterian Church, Geelong
- 38°08′49″S 144°21′11″E
- Location: 13 Ryrie Street, Geelong, Victoria
- Country: Australia
- Denomination: Presbyterian

History
- Status: Closed
- Founded: 12 June 1861
- Founder: Dr. Alexander James Campbell

Architecture
- Architect: Nathaniel Billing
- Architectural type: Church
- Style: Gothic Revival
- Years built: 1860, 1908, 1936
- Closed: January 2015

St George's Presbyterian Church is a former Presbyterian church located on the corner of Latrobe Terrace and Ryrie Street in Geelong, Victoria, Australia. Constructed in 1861, the church is noted for its Victorian Gothic Revival architecture and its association with prominent early local figures in Geelong and its surrounds. The site also includes an adjacent former manse designed in matching style.

== History ==
St George's Presbyterian Church was built in 1861 by members who separated from St Andrew's Presbyterian Church in Yarra Street, reflecting both the growth of Geelong's Presbyterian population and a desire for a larger place of worship. The foundation stone was officially laid on 12 June 1861, and the church was constructed by contractors Brown and Gibson to designs by architect Nathaniel Billing. Built in an Early English Gothic Revival style, the church was constructed of bluestone with freestone dressings, reflecting the prosperity of its early patrons, which included philanthropist Francis Ormond and other Western District pastoralists.

The first minister of St George's was Dr. Alexander James Campbell, a prominent figure in Geelong's religious and educational life. Campbell played a key role in the early development of The Geelong College, and close connections existed between the church and the school, with students and staff attending services regularly.

Several major additions were made during the late nineteenth and early twentieth centuries. In 1908, transepts and a narthex were added to the original nave, expanding the capacity of the building. In 1936, a tower and spire were added to commemorate the congregation's 75th anniversary, funded by James McPhillimy and his sister Louise. Memorial stained glass windows were installed throughout the building, including World War I memorial windows unveiled in 1921, commemorating members of the congregation who served in the conflict.

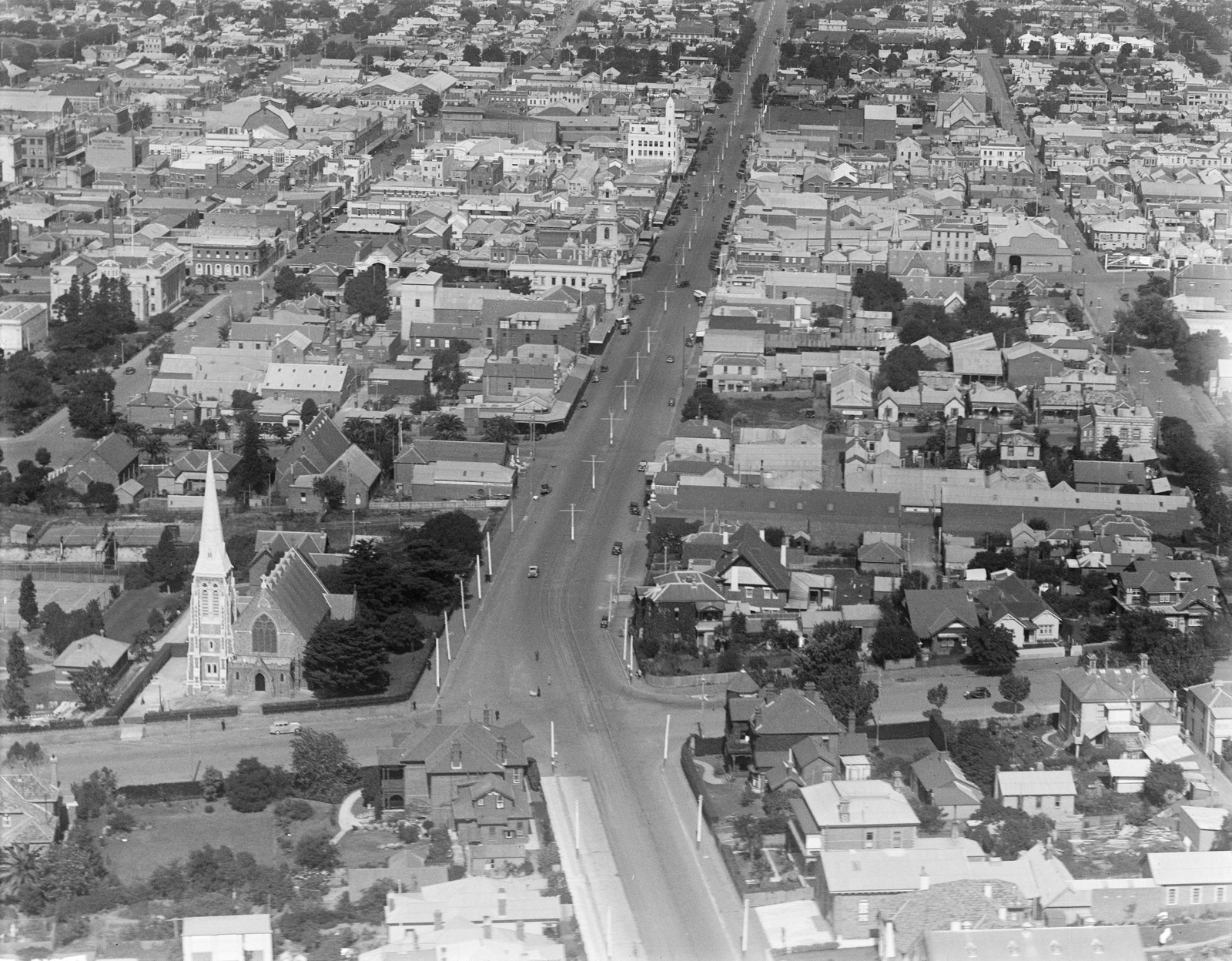
An aerial view of St. George's Presbyterian Church, Geelong including part of the Geelong City Centre

Regular worship services at St George's Presbyterian Church ceased in January 2015, following declining congregation numbers and increasing maintenance costs. The closure was initially described as temporary, but services were not resumed in subsequent years. In later years, the building was placed on the market, attracting interest for adaptive reuse due to its prominent location and heritage status.

== See also ==
- List of Presbyterian churches in Victoria
