= Keith Millar =

Australian sportsman

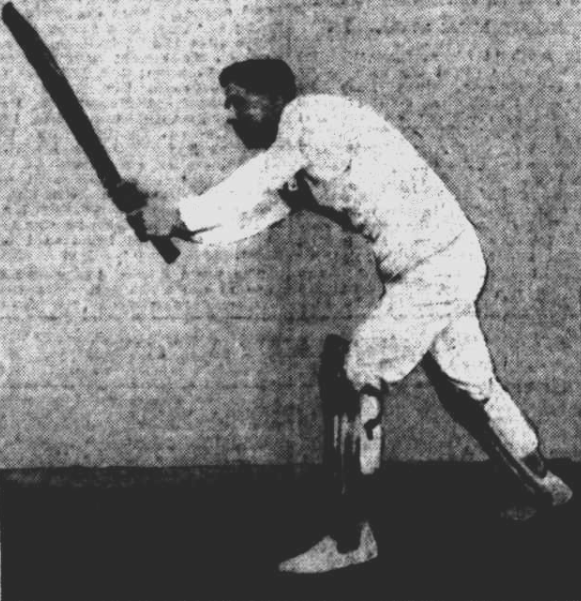

Personal information
- Full name: Keith James Millar
- Born: 15 August 1906; Richmond, Victoria
- Died: 13 July 1971 (aged 64); Camberwell, Victoria
- Height: 183 cm (6 ft 0 in)
- Weight: 82 kg (181 lb)
- Position: Half forward

Playing career^{1}
Years	Club	Games (Goals)
1924–27, 1930	Richmond	37 (38)
- ^{1} Playing statistics correct to the end of 1930.

Career highlights
- 5th (equal) in the 1926 Brownlow Medal

Keith James Millar (15 August 1906 – 13 July 1971) was an Australian sportsman who played Australian rules football with Richmond in the Victorian Football League (VFL) during the 1920s and first-class cricket for Victoria. Not to be confused with Australian Test cricketer Keith Miller, who played in the Victorian Football League as well.

Millar, a half forward, took part in the 1924 round-robin finals series, where Richmond missed out on the premiership by percentage. He had his best season in 1926 when he finished equal fifth in the Brownlow Medal count and represented Victoria three times in interstate matches. After retiring in 1930, Millar returned to the league as a field umpire six years later and umpired three games during the 1936 VFL season.

His cricket career was played mostly while he was a Richmond footballer, between the 1924/25 and 1932/33 summers. An all-rounder, Millar appeared in 14 first-class matches as a right-handed batsman and right-arm fast-medium pace bowler. Millar made 382 runs at 19.10 with two half centuries and took 14 wickets at 36.28. He took nine of those wickets during a 1925 tour of New Zealand by the Victorians and included the scalp of Test cricketer Stewie Dempster. They took on New Zealand in a match at Basin Reserve, Wellington in the same tour and, despite batting at ten, Millar scored 56 in his first innings. His highest first-class score came in a Sheffield Shield match against Queensland in 1927 at the Brisbane Cricket Ground where he batted up the order and made 64 runs.

Keith was the son-in-law of long-time Richmond champion Jack Titus after marrying his daughter Mabel.

== See also ==
- List of Victoria first-class cricketers
