= Frank Ross (Australian footballer) =

Australian rules footballer

Personal information
- Full name: Frank Conrad Hope Ross
- Born: 2 July 1900; Rochester, Victoria
- Died: 25 November 1975 (aged 75); Malvern, Victoria
- Original team: University
- Height: 178 cm (5 ft 10 in)
- Weight: 76 kg (168 lb)

Playing career^{1}
Years	Club	Games (Goals)
1922–1924	South Melbourne	32 (2)
- ^{1} Playing statistics correct to the end of 1924.

Frank Conrad Hope Ross (2 July 1900 – 25 November 1975) was an Australian rules footballer who played with South Melbourne in the Victorian Football League (VFL).
