= Jacky Harris =

Australian rules footballer

Personal information
- Full name: John Harris
- Born: 17 November 1900; Albert Park, Victoria
- Died: 25 November 1943 (aged 43); Kiama, New South Wales
- Height: 165 cm (5 ft 5 in)
- Weight: 64 kg (141 lb)

Playing career^{1}
| Years | Club | Games (Goals) |
| 1924–1925 | South Melbourne | 6 (10) |
- ^{1} Playing statistics correct to the end of 1925.

Jacky Harris (17 November 1900 – 25 November 1943) was an Australian rules footballer who played with South Melbourne in the Victorian Football League (VFL).
