= Gil Miller =

Australian rules footballer

Personal information
- Full name: Gilbert Henry Miller
- Born: 17 August 1903; Carlton, Victoria
- Died: 14 October 1944 (aged 41); Armadale, Victoria
- Height: 182 cm (6 ft 0 in)
- Weight: 86 kg (190 lb)

Playing career^{1}
| Years | Club | Games (Goals) |
| 1924 | South Melbourne | 1 (1) |
- ^{1} Playing statistics correct to the end of 1924.

Gilbert Henry Miller (17 August 1903 – 14 October 1944) was an Australian rules footballer who played with South Melbourne in the Victorian Football League (VFL).
