= Phil Brooks (footballer) =

Australian rules footballer

Personal information
- Full name: Phillip Henry Albert Brookes
- Born: 11 October 1901; South Melbourne, Victoria
- Died: 19 August 1963 (aged 61); South Melbourne, Victoria
- Original team: Waterside Workers
- Height: 178 cm (5 ft 10 in)
- Weight: 76 kg (168 lb)

Playing career^{1}
Years	Club	Games (Goals)
1924	South Melbourne	2 (1)
1931	Hawthorn	2 (2)
Total		4 (3)
- ^{1} Playing statistics correct to the end of 1931.

Phil Brooks (11 October 1901 – 19 August 1963) was an Australian rules footballer who played with South Melbourne and Hawthorn in the Victorian Football League (VFL).
