= Tom Joyce (footballer) =

Australian rules footballer

Personal information
- Full name: Tom Joyce
- Born: 1 May 1901
- Died: 15 January 1987 (aged 85)
- Original team: Yarraville
- Height: 168 cm (5 ft 6 in)
- Weight: 67 kg (148 lb)
- Position: Wing

Playing career^{1}
Years	Club	Games (Goals)
1923–1925	South Melbourne	28 (6)
- ^{1} Playing statistics correct to the end of 1925.

Tom Joyce (1 May 1901 – 15 January 1987) was an Australian rules footballer who played with South Melbourne in the Victorian Football League (VFL).
