= Sean Sowerby =

Australian sports presenter and reporter

- Born: 28 June 1983 (age 43); Geelong, Victoria
- Occupations: Sport Presenter & Reporter
- Spouse: Bianca
- Children: 3

Sean Sowerby (born 28 June 1983) is an Australian sports presenter and reporter.

== Career ==
Sowerby's media career began at 3AW as a producer and reporter after graduating from Melbourne University and Australian Catholic University. He produced a number of programs at the station including Sports Today, Glossing Over as well as majoring sporting events such as the 2006 Melbourne Commonwealth Games and 2004 Athens Olympic Games.

In 2006, Sowerby allowed an incorrect attribution of himself as a Melbourne Victory fan in a TV interview for Nine News, withholding that he was in fact a producer at 3AW at the time. He provided mobile phone video footage of fans singing as proof of "violence" in the crowd that he alleged.

In December 2006, Sowerby moved to WIN TV where he held a number of positions on WIN News including head sports reporter, sports presenter and bureau chief. He also worked as host of the popular country football show Off The Bench alongside Danny Frawley, Liam Pickering, Wayne Schwass, Terry Wallace and Craig Hutchison. In July 2012, Sowerby resigned from WIN TV after 5 years with the station before joining Network Ten in Melbourne to become a senior news reporter on Ten News. In December 2012, Sowerby moved to the Seven Network to join Seven News as a sports reporter before being appointed to be a weekend sport presenter on Seven News Melbourne replacing Tim Watson. He remained in the position until September 2018, when he was replaced by Jacqueline Felgate. Sowerby remains a sport reporter and fill in sport presenter.

It announced in the early 2021, that Andrew McCormack is going to take-over Sowerby's space to present sport from the Seven Network.

In May 2021, Sowerby resigned from the Seven Network after almost 9 years.

== Personal life ==
In January 2012, Sowerby married Bianca Earle at St Peter's Anglican Church in Brighton. They have three children. Sean is a keen golfer and a two-time winner of the annual Mosh McKew championship.
