= Harry Alexander (footballer) =

Australian rules footballer

Personal information
- Full name: Henry Morris Alexander
- Born: 20 July 1939 (age 87)
- Original team: Sale
- Height: 179 cm (5 ft 10 in)
- Weight: 76 kg (168 lb)
- Position: Wing

Playing career^{1}
Years	Club	Games (Goals)
1962–64	South Melbourne	29 (3)
- ^{1} Playing statistics correct to the end of 1964.

Harry Alexander (born 20 July 1939) is a former Australian rules footballer who played with South Melbourne in the Victorian Football League (VFL).
