= Carji Greeves =

Australian rules footballer, born 1903

- Carji Greeves

Personal information
- Full name: Edward Goderich Greeves, Junior
- Nickname: Carji
- Born: 1 November 1903; Warragul, Victoria, Australia
- Died: 15 April 1963 (aged 59); Ararat, Victoria, Australia
- Original teams: Berrybank, Geelong College
- Height: 175 cm (5 ft 9 in)
- Weight: 76 kg (168 lb)
- Position: Midfield

Playing career^{1}
Years	Club	Games (Goals)
1923–33	Geelong	124 (17)
- ^{1} Playing statistics correct to the end of 1933.

Career highlights
- 2x VFL premiership player (1925, 1931); Brownlow Medallist (1924); Geelong Team of the Century; Inducted into the Australian Football Hall of Fame

Edward Goderich "Carji" Greeves Jr. (1 November 1903 – 15 April 1963) was an Australian rules footballer who played for the Geelong Football Club in the Victorian Football League (VFL), now known as the Australian Football League (AFL). He won the inaugural Brownlow Medal in 1924, awarded to the VFL/AFL player adjudged fairest and best during the home-and-away season. He is the son of Ted Greeves, who also played with the Geelong Football Club.

Greeves is the namesake of the Carji Greeves Medal, the Geelong Football Club's best and fairest award.

== Family and personal life ==
In the 1860s, Greeves' grandmother Julie (née Anderson) was briefly engaged to Tom Wills, the famed cricketer and founder of Australian rules football. Historian Col Hutchinson noted that "If Tom Wills had married Julie, we wouldn't have had Carji Greeves".

Greeves was given the nickname "Carji" as a baby by a friend of the family, the New South Wales golfer Michael Scott, most likely after a character in A Country Girl, a popular musical play of the day.

Greeves also attended The Geelong College after receiving his early education at the Struan Dam School, South of Lismore, Victoria, where he was a schoolmate of Geelong champion Reg Hickey.

== VFL career ==
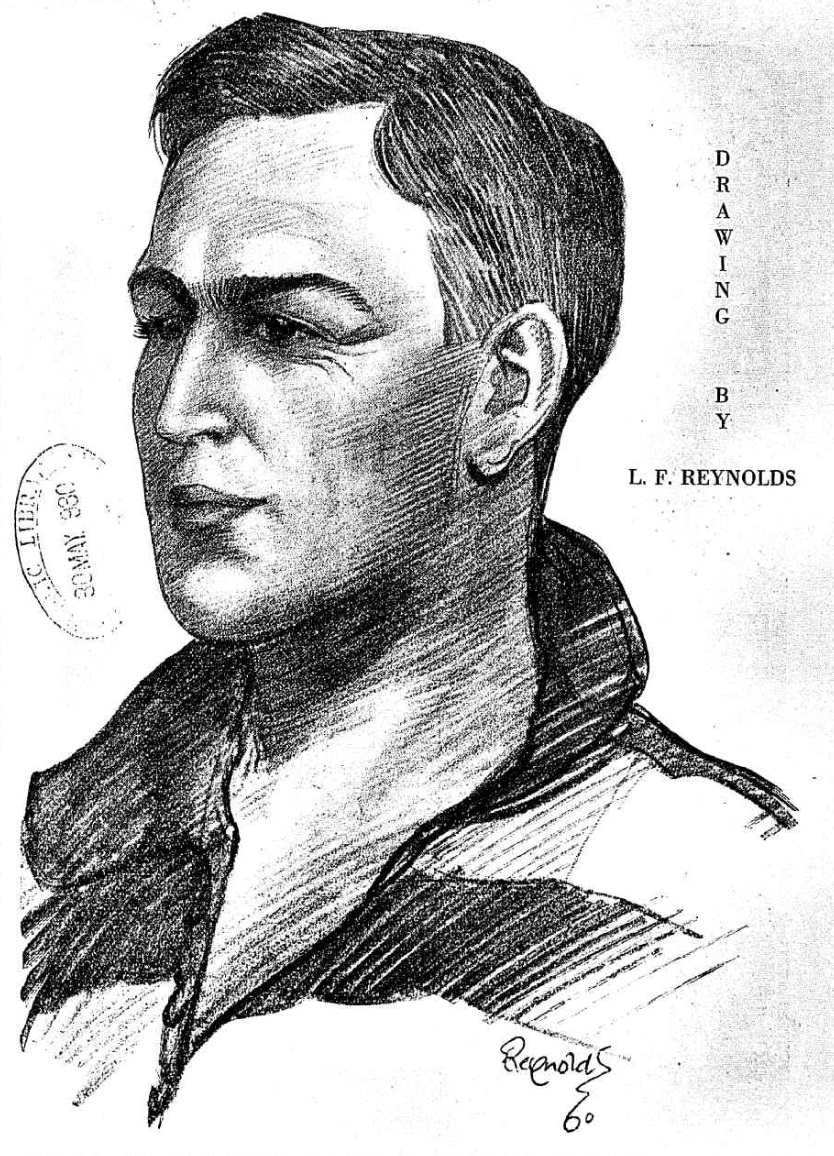
A sketch of Greeves by Len Reynolds (1930)

Greeves played with the Geelong Football Club from 1923 to 1931 and wore jumper number 20.

Greeves was honoured with having the Geelong Football Club's best-and-fairest award named after him, the Carji Greeves Medal. In 1996, Greeves was inducted into the Australian Football Hall of Fame. He also won the first Brownlow Medal, the award given to the player deemed to be the "fairest and best." "Best" refers to the players being voted upon by officials for who was best on ground, and "fairest" means that the player did not serve a suspension during the competition.

Greeves represented Victoria in interstate matches seven times.

== Post Football ==
Greeves kicking prowess had him head hunted by college football club UCLA in 1928 as a kicking coach and he moved to the United States. He would study at Stanford University, where he coached students there in Australian Rules.

From the 1930s, Greeves suffered from pulmonary tuberculosis and emphysema. He died on 15 April 1963 at the age of 59.

Since 2004, The 'Carji' Greeves Club is the name of the Football Parents' Support Club at The Geelong College.
