= Jim Karthaus =

Australian rules footballer

Personal information
- Full name: James Stoddart Karthaus
- Born: 23 June 1898; Bairnsdale, Victoria
- Died: 20 October 1989 (aged 91)
- Original team: Richmond United Team
- Height: 173 cm (5 ft 8 in)
- Weight: 67 kg (148 lb)
- Position: Wing

Playing career^{1}
Years	Club	Games (Goals)
1920–24	Richmond	26 (2)
- ^{1} Playing statistics correct to the end of 1924.

James Stoddart Karthaus (23 June 1898 – 20 October 1989) was a former Australian rules footballer who played with Richmond in the Victorian Football League (VFL).

Karthaus later played with Camberwell in the Victorian Football Association (VFA).
