= Mark Tandy (footballer) =

Australian rules footballer

Personal information
- Full name: Mark Henry Tandy
- Born: 3 September 1892; Newport, Victoria
- Died: 19 May 1965 (aged 72); South Melbourne, Victoria
- Original team: Yarraville (VJFA)
- Height: 173 cm (5 ft 8 in)
- Weight: 70 kg (154 lb)

Playing career^{1}
| Years | Club | Games (Goals) |
| 1911–1926 | South Melbourne | 207 (47) |
- ^{1} Playing statistics correct to the end of 1926.

Career highlights
- South Melbourne captain 1922; South Melbourne premiership 1918; South Melbourne/Sydney Swans Team of the Century; Victorian representative (13 matches, 8 goals)

Mark Henry "Napper" Tandy (3 September 1892 – 19 May 1965) was an Australian rules footballer in the (then) Victorian Football League in the early 20th century.

== Family ==
The son of Henry Thomas Tandy, and Catherine Lucy Tandy (1860–1945), née Williams, Mark Henry Tandy was born in Newport, Victoria on 3 September 1892.

He married Lily Ford in 1917.

== Football ==
His quiet and easy-going nature led to Roy Cazaly calling him "Napper" – "the inglorious nickname "Napper" ... apparently arose because of his alleged propensity for "switching off" during games" (John Devaney, Full Points Footy Publications).

An accomplished rover/wingman, Mark Tandy early in his career brought South Melbourne their second premiership in the 1918 Grand Final. With South trailing by a point, Tandy made an inspired run down the wing to deliver the ball into the forward lines where Laird kicked the winning goal.

== Team of the Century ==
On 8 August 2003, he was selected as an interchange in the Sydney Swans "Team of the Century".

== Hall of Fame ==
One of the initial 136 inductees, Tandy was inducted into the Australian Football Hall of Fame in 1996.

== See also ==
- 1921 Perth Carnival
- 1924 Hobart Carnival
