= Tom Hickey (footballer, born 1901) =

Australian rules footballer, born 1901

Personal information
- Full name: Thomas Arthur Hickey
- Born: 20 December 1901; Carlton, Victoria
- Died: 14 September 1935 (aged 33); Macleod, Victoria
- Height: 180 cm (5 ft 11 in)
- Weight: 76 kg (168 lb)

Playing career^{1}
Years	Club	Games (Goals)
1924–29	Fitzroy	35 (24)
- ^{1} Playing statistics correct to the end of 1929.

Thomas Arthur Hickey (20 December 1901 – 14 September 1935) was an Australian rules footballer who played with Fitzroy in the Victorian Football League (VFL).
