= Thomas J. Hickey =

American politician (1930–2016)

Thomas Joseph Hickey

Member of the Nevada General Assembly
- In office 1972–1982

Member of the Nevada Senate from the 2nd district
- In office 1982–1994

Personal details
- Born: January 4, 1930 Omaha, Nebraska, U.S.
- Died: October 19, 2016 (aged 86) Las Vegas, Nevada, U.S.
- Party: Democratic
- Spouse: Liliam Lujan
- Children: Liliam, Silvia, Mary

Military service
- Branch/service: United States Army
- Battles/wars: Korean War

Thomas Joseph Hickey (January 4, 1930 – October 19, 2016), was an American politician who was a Democratic member of the Nevada General Assembly (1973–1982) and the Nevada Senate (1983–1994). An alumnus of the University of Nebraska, he was a former brakeman with the Union Pacific Railroad.
