= Bill Condon (footballer) =

Australian rules footballer

Personal information
- Full name: William Thomas Condon
- Born: 14 July 1901; South Melbourne, Victoria
- Died: 30 August 1963 (aged 62); St Kilda East, Victoria
- Height: 173 cm (5 ft 8 in)
- Weight: 70 kg (154 lb)

Playing career^{1}
Years	Club	Games (Goals)
1923–1927	South Melbourne	72 (32)
- ^{1} Playing statistics correct to the end of 1927.

William Thomas Condon (14 July 1901 – 30 August 1963) was an Australian rules footballer who played with South Melbourne in the Victorian Football League (VFL).
