= Jim Spain =

Australian rules footballer, born 1902

Personal information
- Full name: Jim Spain
- Born: 17 September 1902
- Died: 19 June 1983 (aged 80)
- Original team: Beverley
- Height: 183 cm (6 ft 0 in)
- Weight: 76 kg (168 lb)

Playing career^{1}
Years	Club	Games (Goals)
1923–25, 1927	Richmond	40 (2)
- ^{1} Playing statistics correct to the end of 1927.

Jim Spain (17 September 1902 – 19 June 1983) was a former Australian rules footballer who played with Richmond in the Victorian Football League (VFL).
