= Jack Barnett (footballer) =

Australian rules footballer

Personal information
- Full name: Henry John Barnett
- Born: 25 July 1899; Auckland, New Zealand
- Died: 31 January 1979 (aged 79); New South Wales
- Height: 165 cm (5 ft 5 in)
- Weight: 66 kg (146 lb)

Playing career^{1}
Years	Club	Games (Goals)
1924–26	Richmond	13 (11)
- ^{1} Playing statistics correct to the end of 1926.

Henry John Barnett (25 July 1899 – 31 January 1979) was an Australian rules footballer who played with Richmond in the Victorian Football League (VFL).

Barnett enlisted in the Royal Australian Air Force in August 1928 and served until July 1954, being stationed at RAAF Base Richmond for most of that time.

Barnett first played senior football on the west coast of Tasmania with the Gormanston Football Club, which played in the Lyell Miners Football Association, based in Queenstown. The large mines in the region supplied sufficient players for 9 teams.
