= List of Michael Roach Medal recipients =

The Michael Roach Medal is an Australian rules football award given each season to the leading goalkicker (or goalkickers) for the Richmond Football Club.

The award is now named in honour of Michael Roach, Richmond's "best post-war full forward". Roach won the goalkicking award at Richmond on seven occasions; in 1980 kicked the highest individual season goal tally in Tiger history and became only the second Richmond full forward to kick over 100 goals in a season; and was the first Richmond player to win the VFL/AFL goalkicking award twice (Jack Riewoldt winning it for the second time in 2012).

Richmond's best pre-war full forward, Jack Titus, led the goalkicking at Richmond on eleven occasions. Retiring in 2009, Richmond forward Matthew Richardson was the club's leading goalkicker on thirteen occasions.

Former Richmond captain Jeff Hogg won the award five times, while and Kevin Bartlett has won the award four times. Jack Riewoldt won the award twelve times and won the Coleman Medal a club-record three times. A number of players were the club's leading goalkicker for the season on three occasions – George Bayliss, Doug Strang, Dick Harris, Ray Poulter, Bob Dummett, Ted Langridge.

== Leading goalkickers by season ==
The following is a list of Richmond leading goalkickers in each season.

^	Denotes current player
+	Player won Coleman Medal in same season

=== VFA era ===
Season	Player(s)	Goals
1885	Jack Conlon	6
1885	William Wells	6
1886	Alf Hill	10
1887	Alf Hill (2)	11
1888	Billy Brown	53
1889	Billy Brown (2)	25
1890	Alf Elder	8
1891	Alf Elder (2)	15
1892	George Sparrow	19
1893	George Sparrow (2)	23
1894	Fred Alsop	21
1895	Fred Alsop (2)	19
1896	Richard Kelly	12
1897	Alf Elder (3)	28
1898	Alf Elder (4)	20
1899	Hector Milne	16
1900	George Backhouse	15
1901	James Douglas	13
1902	R. Duncan	17
1903	Jack Main	34
1904	Jack Hutchinson	40
1905	Dick Knell	46
1906	Jack Hutchinson (2)	55
1907	Jack Hutchinson (3)	67

=== VFL era ===
Season	Player(s)	Goals
1908	Bill Bourke	25
1909	Bill Bourke (2)	20
1910	Michael Maguire	20
1911	Michael Maguire (2)	29
1912	Ted Keggin	24
1913	Percy Martyn	32
1914	Clarrie Hall	32
1915	Clarrie Hall (2)	25
1916	Percy Martini	22
1917	Charlie Fehring	14
1918	Donald Don	19
1919	Donald Don (2)	31
1920	George Bayliss+	63
1921	George Bayliss (2)	53
1922	George Bayliss (3)	32
1923	Don Fraser, Sr.	18
1924	Mel Morris	44
1925	Mel Morris (2)	25
1926	Dave Lynch	31
1927	Jack Baggott	37
1928	Jack Baggott (2)	61
1929	Jack Titus	54
1930	Jack Titus (2)	50
1931	Doug Strang	68
1932	Doug Strang (2)	49
1933	Doug Strang (3)	51
1934	Jack Titus (3)	80
1935	Jack Titus (4)	83
1936	Jack Titus (5)	83
1937	Dick Harris+	65
1937	Jack Titus (6)	65
1938	Jack Titus (7)	72
1939	Jack Titus (8)	48
1940	Jack Titus+ (9)	100
1941	Jack Titus (10)	87
1942	Jack Titus (11)	67
1943	Dick Harris (2)	63
1944	Dick Harris (3)	63
1945	Fred Burge	55
1946	Arthur Mooney	49
1947	Jack Dyer	46
1948	Jack Dyer (2)	64
1949	Ray Poulter	51
1950	Ray Poulter (2)	56
1951	Jack O'Rourke	58
1952	Jack O'Rourke (2)	43
1953	Ron Branton	22
1954	Ron Branton (2)	33
1955	Ray Poulter (3)	49
1956	Bob Dummett	32
1957	Bob Dummett (2)	41
1958	Ted Langridge	28
1959	Bob Dummett (3)	45
1960	Graeme Wilkinson	21
1961	Ted Langridge (2)	29
1962	Ted Langridge (3)	42
1963	Ian Hayden	25
1964	Roger Dean	23
1965	Mick Erwin	32
1966	Paddy Guinane	50
1967	Royce Hart	55
1968	Paddy Guinane (2)	41
1969	Rex Hunt	55
1970	Eric Moore	41
1971	Royce Hart (2)	59
1972	Neil Balme	55
1972	Ricky McLean	55
1973	Neil Balme (2)	34
1974	Kevin Bartlett	47
1975	Kevin Bartlett (2)	42
1976	Robert Lamb	38
1977	Kevin Bartlett (3)	55
1978	Bruce Monteath	55
1979	Michael Roach	90
1980	Michael Roach+ (2)	112
1981	Michael Roach+ (3)	86
1982	Brian Taylor	71
1983	Kevin Bartlett (4)	37
1983	Michael Roach (4)	37
1984	Brian Taylor	61
1985	Michael Roach (5)	80
1986	Michael Roach (6)	62
1987	Michael Roach (7)	43
1988	Jeff Hogg	57
1989	Jeff Hogg (2)	34

=== AFL era ===
Season	Player(s)	Goals
1990	Stephen Ryan	28
1991	Jeff Hogg (3)	68
1992	Jeff Hogg (4)	45
1993	Jeff Hogg (5)	57
1994	Matthew Richardson	56
1995	Nick Daffy	45
1996	Matthew Richardson (2)	91
1997	Matthew Richardson (3)	47
1998	Matthew Richardson (4)	55
1999	Matthew Richardson (5)	67
2000	Matthew Rogers	37
2001	Matthew Richardson (6)	59
2002	Matthew Richardson (7)	36
2003	Matthew Richardson (8)	33
2004	Matthew Richardson (9)	65
2005	Matthew Richardson (10)	65
2006	Matthew Richardson (11)	45
2007	Matthew Richardson (12)	53
2008	Matthew Richardson (13)	48
2009	Mitch Morton	41
2010	Jack Riewoldt+	78
2011	Jack Riewoldt (2)	62
2012	Jack Riewoldt+ (3)	65
2013	Jack Riewoldt (4)	58
2014	Jack Riewoldt (5)	61
2015	Jack Riewoldt (6)	54
2016	Jack Riewoldt (7)	48
2017	Jack Riewoldt (8)	54
2018	Jack Riewoldt+ (9)	70
2019	Tom Lynch^	63
2020	Jack Riewoldt (10)	33
2021	Jack Riewoldt (11)	51
2022	Tom Lynch^ (2)	63
2023	Jack Riewoldt (12)	32
2024	Shai Bolton	34
2025	Seth Campbell	28
2026	Mykelti Lefau	23

== Multiple winners ==
Number of Wins	Player	Seasons
13	Matthew Richardson	1994, 1996–99, 2001–08
12	Jack Riewoldt	2010–18, 2020–21, 2023
11	Jack Titus	1929–30, 1934–42
7	Michael Roach	1979–81, 1983, 1985–87
5	Jeff Hogg	1988–89, 1991–93
4	Kevin Bartlett	1974–75, 1977, 1983
3	George Bayliss	1920–22
3	Doug Strang	1931–33
3	Dick Harris	1937, 1943–44
3	Ray Poulter	1949–50, 1955
3	Bob Dummett	1956-57, 1959
3	Ted Langridge	1958, 1960–61
2	Bill Bourke	1908–09
2	Michael Maguire	1910–11
2	Clarrie Hall	1914–15
2	Donald Don	1918–19
2	Mel Morris	1924–25
2	Jack Baggott	1927–28
2	Jack O'Rourke	1951–52
2	Paddy Guinane	1966, 1968
2	Royce Hart	1967, 1971
2	Neil Balme	1972–73
2	Tom Lynch^	2019, 2022

VFL–AFL Era Inclusive

== AFL Women's ==
Season	Leading goalkicker	Goals
2020	Courtney Wakefield	4
2021	Katie Brennan^	14
2022 (S6)	Katie Brennan^ (2)	14
2022 (S7)	Courtney Wakefield (2)	14
2023	Katie Brennan^ (3)	14
2024	Katie Brennan^ (4)	13
2024	Caitlin Greiser^	13
2025	Caitlin Greiser (2)	10
