= Michael Roach (footballer) =

Australian rules footballer, born 1958

Personal information
- Nickname: Disco
- Born: 9 October 1958 (age 68); Longford, Tasmania
- Original team: Longford (NTFL)
- Height: 193 cm (6 ft 4 in)
- Weight: 92 kg (14 st 7 lb)

Playing career^{1}
Years	Club	Games (Goals)
1975–1976	Longford	36 (79)
1977–1989	Richmond	200 (607)
Total		236 (686)
- ^{1} Playing statistics correct to the end of 1989.

Career highlights
- Richmond premiership player: 1980; Richmond Leading Goalkicker: 1979–81, 1983, 1985–87; Coleman Medal: 1980–81; Interstate games: 3; All-Australian: 1979; Richmond Hall of Fame – inducted 2002; 100 Tiger Treasures: "Mark of the Century"

Michael Terrence Roach (born 9 October 1958) is a former Australian rules football player who represented Richmond in the Victorian Football League (VFL) from 1977 to 1989.

Remembered for his long, accurate kicking for goal and strong marking, for a brief period Roach was the best forward in Australian football. The second of four key forwards recruited by Richmond from Tasmania (the others being Royce Hart, Matthew Richardson and Jack Riewoldt), Roach was an enormously popular player whose career did not quite live up to expectation because of injury and constant shuffling of his position by the club. Nevertheless, he achieved many honours in the game and became one of the first players from Tasmania to play 200 VFL games.

== Early career ==
As a junior player at Westbury in Tasmania, Roach won state representation and he was selected to play senior football for Longford in 1975, aged only 16. He impressed by winning the club's goalkicking award in his two seasons and was selected to represent both the league and Tasmania, in two interstate fixtures. Richmond talent scout Harry Jenkins, who had discovered the by-then legendary Royce Hart, rang the Tigers with a succinct message: "I got another one for you."

Richmond rushed the young Roach over to Melbourne for the 1977 season. Expectations of the 18-year-old recruit were high. Initially, Roach's rise in the game was much quicker than Royce Hart's had been. At 193 cm, Roach was taller than Hart and had a much more developed physique. In addition, he was very mobile and agile for his size. With Hart in his last season, the Tigers decided to ease Roach into the game slowly and he played nine senior games on the wing, thus emphasising his athleticism. At season's end, he played well on a forward flank in Richmond's reserves Grand Final win over Footscray. But 1978 proved a big let down, and injuries and ordinary form kept him to just three games.

== Star goalkicker ==
In the off-season, new Tiger coach Tony Jewell urged Roach to continue his weight training with the lure of the regular full-forward position. Hart tutored the right-footed tyro in the art of kicking the long, accurate drop punt. By now mature and filled out to 92 kg, Roach took the game by storm in the opening half of the new season. To his brilliant contested marking he added an excellent lead and was a revelation when shooting for goal, rarely missing. Capable of goaling from a long way out, Roach raised standards among key forwards by regularly employing his non-preferred foot when kicking and often handballed to a teammate in a better position even when within scoring range. Previously, these actions were anathema to most forwards, who were expected to shoot for goal no matter how difficult the opportunity. Roach left an indelible imprint on the game with an amazingly high mark in a match against Hawthorn on 5 May 1979. In the ensuing years, video of the mark has been played countless times on television while a photograph of Roach sitting atop a pack of Hawk defenders was reproduced as posters, bags, men's ties and even as a carpet pattern.

Even though Roach was dominating and kicking goals, the team was struggling to win. He was picked to play for Victoria, but an injury in the game cut into his performance and he missed three games mid-season. These missed games proved costly on two counts at season's end – he finished ten goals short of a century and lost the VFL goalkicking honour to Kelvin Templeton by just one goal. In round 18 against St Kilda, Roach became the first Richmond player to kick ten goals in a match since 1945. Richmond improved markedly in the second half of the year and looked eagerly to the next year with their brilliant key forward combination of Roach and David Cloke. Both players were voted All-Australian after a post-season state of origin carnival.

In 1980, with Richmond heading toward the record for the highest aggregate in a season, Roach was the key to the Tigers' attack. Scoring eleven goals in one game and twice booting ten, he surged toward the first century of goals in a season for the club since Jack Titus in 1940. The milestone was reached two games before the finals against Melbourne at the MCG, typically, with a long drop punt from inside the centre square that followed a strong mark on the lead. He finished the day with nine, but Roach's form tapered after that point. Richmond went into the finals placed third and won three finals in a row to take their tenth premiership. In the three finals, he managed just five goals, and was overshadowed by veteran Kevin Bartlett, who booted 21 goals. Regardless, Roach was a premiership player and set a still unbeaten club record of 112 goals for the year. Continuing this form the next year, Roach won the inaugural Coleman Medal for the VFL's highest goalkicker during the regular season. However, his 86 goals failed to lift the Tigers into the finals in a disappointing follow up to the flag.

== Roach and Taylor ==
Richmond faced a dilemma. For several years, they had several outstanding full-forward prospects in their minor teams who could not progress with Roach in the way. One was Mark Jackson, who was cleared to Melbourne in 1981 and became the eccentric comedian/forward of the 1980s, now better remembered for his off-field career. Another was West Australian Brian Taylor, a less athletic player than Roach who favoured the strong lead and set shot for goal, and liked to ruffle the feathers of opposition players. His fiery temperament and confrontational style was the complete opposite of Roach's phlegmatic personality.

Richmond solved the problem in 1982 by playing Taylor at full-forward and using Roach around the ground, including the ruck. This worked very well until Taylor, seemingly set to kick a century for the year, was injured mid-season in a meaningless night fixture. Richmond covered the loss and finished the home-and-away season on top for the first time in eight years. In the semi-final against Carlton, Roach was switched to centre half-forward at the start of the game, catching the Blues off-guard and he was a great player in a strong win. Unfortunately, he was one of several Richmond players who failed to live up to reputation when the Tigers went down in the Grand Final to the Blues a fortnight later. Taylor was not selected for the game.

With the club plunged into turmoil by player discontent and numerous transfers, Roach stayed loyal to Richmond, but Taylor was preferred as the full-forward for 1983–1984 with only moderate success. During this period, Roach received a bad back injury that severely affected his mobility and effectiveness. Finally, it was decided to solve the Roach–Taylor impasse by clearing Taylor to Collingwood for 1985.

== Return to full-forward – final years ==
Returned to full-forward at last, Roach enjoyed one of his finest seasons in 1985. He equalled his career-best effort by booting 11 goals against Hawthorn on 27 April in probably his best-ever game for the club, and scored eight of the team's eleven goals in the grudge match with Collingwood late in the year. Although the Tigers struggled badly, Roach tied for fourth place (coincidentally with Brian Taylor) on the VFL's goalkicking table with 80 goals. Had he not missed five games, he may have topped the century again. Roach followed that with 62 goals in 20 games during 1986, but he lost the head-to-head with Taylor, who scored a century for the only time in his career. Roach received Richmond life membership that year.

Chronic injury blighted the final three years of Roach's playing career. In 1988, under new coach Kevin Bartlett, Roach played just three games for the year as a defender, and his key forward position was given to youngster Jeff Hogg. It disappointed the Richmond fans to see one of the club's greatest forwards vainly trying to hold back the tide as the opposition booted huge scores against the undermanned Richmond defence. In 1989, his final season, Roach was given seven games to make his 200-game career milestone, and then retired. He remained at the club though, taking up a position as a skills coach.

== Comparisons ==
Roach's average of 3.03 goals per game rates with the best, but he never placed in the club's best and fairest award. Although player depth is a must for a strong team, the situation with Taylor and Roach competing for the one position ultimately worked against both players and the club. Fatefully for Roach, he was too often played away from full-forward, by far his best position. In the five seasons when he was fit and exclusively the full-forward (1979–1981 and 1985–1986), he scored 430 goals in 102 matches, over four per game. This included ten bags of eight or more goals in a game. He was leading goalkicker for the club seven times and today the club awards the "Michael Roach Medal" to its highest goal scorer for the season.

Throughout the 1990s, Roach worked at Punt Road as a specialist coach, was team manager of the reserves and a highly visible figure in the Save our Skins campaign of 1989–1990 that saved the club from bankruptcy. Controversially omitted from Richmond's Team of the Century in 1998, he was inducted into the club's Hall of Fame four years later. All the while he continued to maintain strong links with Richmond, living in the suburb and he had a great thrill when his son Thomas was drafted to the Tigers under the father–son rule, in 2004. Unfortunately for the younger Roach, he was delisted at the end of the 2006 season after only a handful of senior games.

== Statistics ==
Legend
G	Goals	K	Kicks	D	Disposals	T	Tackles
B	Behinds	H	Handballs	M	Marks

Led the league for the season only
Led the league after finals only
Led the league after the season and finals

Season	Team	No.	Games	Totals							Averages (per game)						
Season	Team	No.	Games	G	B	K	H	D	M	T	G	B	K	H	D	M	T
1977	Richmond	8	9	7	2	93	45	138	43	—N/a	0.8	0.2	10.3	5.0	15.3	4.8	—N/a
1978	Richmond	8	3	2	1	17	10	27	8	—N/a	0.7	0.5	5.7	3.3	9.0	2.7	—N/a
1979	Richmond	8	19	90	34	174	53	227	109	—N/a	4.7	1.8	9.2	2.8	11.9	5.7	—N/a
1980	Richmond	8	25	112	42	208	50	258	134	—N/a	4.5	1.7	8.3	2.0	10.3	5.4	—N/a
1981	Richmond	8	21	86	31	188	55	243	107	—N/a	4.1	1.5	9.0	2.6	11.6	5.1	—N/a
1982	Richmond	8	22	35	28	270	81	351	128	—N/a	1.6	1.3	12.3	3.7	16.0	5.8	—N/a
1983	Richmond	8	19	37	24	183	62	245	112	—N/a	1.9	1.3	9.6	3.3	12.9	5.9	—N/a
1984	Richmond	8	19	36	30	177	30	207	87	—N/a	1.9	1.6	9.3	1.6	10.9	4.6	—N/a
1985	Richmond	8	17	80	39	165	24	189	109	—N/a	4.7	2.3	9.7	1.4	11.1	6.4	—N/a
1986	Richmond	8	20	62	26	148	29	177	94	—N/a	3.1	1.3	7.4	1.5	8.9	4.7	—N/a
1987	Richmond	8	16	43	35	133	22	155	85	7	2.7	2.2	8.3	1.4	9.7	5.3	0.4
1988	Richmond	8	3	8	2	20	7	27	10	2	2.7	0.7	6.7	2.3	9.0	3.3	0.7
1989	Richmond	8	7	9	12	34	8	42	20	0	1.3	1.7	4.9	1.1	6.0	2.9	0.0
Career			200	607	306	1810	476	2286	1046	9	3.0	1.5	9.1	2.4	11.4	5.2	0.0
