= Poulter =

A poulter is a person who looks after, sells or prepares poultry.

Poulter may also refer to:

== People ==
- Arthur Poulter (1893–1956), British Victoria Cross recipient
- Caleb Poulter (born 2002), Australian rules footballer
- Dan Poulter (born 1978), British MP
- Gary Poulter (1959–2013), American street performer and actor
- Harry Poulter (1910–1985), English footballer
- Hayden Poulter (1961–2018), New Zealand serial killer
- Horatio Poulter (1877–1963), British sport shooter
- Ian Poulter (born 1976), English golfer
- Isaac Poulter (born 2001), Canadian ice hockey player
- Joe Poulter (1902–1947), Australian rules footballer
- John Poulter (died 1754), British robber
- John Sayer Poulter (1790–1847), British politician
- Jordyn Poulter (born 1997), American Olympic volleyball player
- Keith Poulter, American game designer
- Leeroy Poulter (born 1981), South African racing driver
- Marlene Clark Poulter, American television soap opera writer
- Max Poulter (1913–1962), Australian educator and politician
- Paul Poulter, British Pickup Truck Racing driver
- Ray Poulter (1929–1999), Australian rules football player
- Sebastian Poulter, British legal scholar
- Stephen Poulter (disambiguation), list of people
- Steven Poulter (born 1954), British former cyclist
- Stuart Poulter (1889–1956), Australian long-distance runner
- Thomas Poulter (1897–1978), American Antarctic explorer
- Will Poulter (born 1993), British actor

== Other uses ==
- River Poulter, a tributary of the River Idle, Nottinghamshire, England
- Poulter (officer), an officer in a mediaeval household responsible for poultry
