= Guinane =

Guinane is a surname. Notable people with the surname include:

- Danny Guinane (1911–1992), Australian rules footballer
- Paddy Guinane (1939–2019), Australian rules footballer
