= Matthew Rogers (Australian rules footballer) =

Australian rules footballer

Personal information
- Born: 25 November 1973 (age 52)
- Original team: South Adelaide (SANFL)
- Debut: Round 1, 26 March 1994, Richmond vs. Footscray, at Western Oval
- Height: 187 cm (6 ft 2 in)
- Weight: 82 kg (181 lb)

Playing career^{1}
Years	Club	Games (Goals)
1994–2004	Richmond	197 (163)
- ^{1} Playing statistics correct to the end of 2004.

Career highlights
- Richmond: Best First Year Player 1994; Richmond Leading Goalkicker: 2000; AFL Rising Star nominee 1994

Matthew Rogers (born 25 November 1973) is a former Australian rules football player who played in the AFL from 1994 to 2004 for the Richmond Football Club.

Rogers was drafted in the 1992 AFL draft, at no. 37 pick (Richmond's fourth). He didn't play his first league game until 1994, playing mainly on the wing and half-forward line kicking 26 goals in that season. His best goal-scoring season was 2000 when he kicked 37 goals and led the club in goalkicking, during the absence of Matthew Richardson due to injury in that year. He also had two children.
