= Keggin =

Keggin is a surname. Notable people with the surname include:

- Ruth Keggin (born 1989), Manx Gaelic singer-songwriter and activist
- Ted Keggin (1891–1968), Australian rules footballer
