= Riewoldt =

Riewoldt is a surname. Notable people with the surname include:

- Jack Riewoldt (born 1982), Australian rules footballer
- Nick Riewoldt (born 1988), Australian rules footballer
