= Jack Riewoldt =

Australian rules footballer (born 1988)

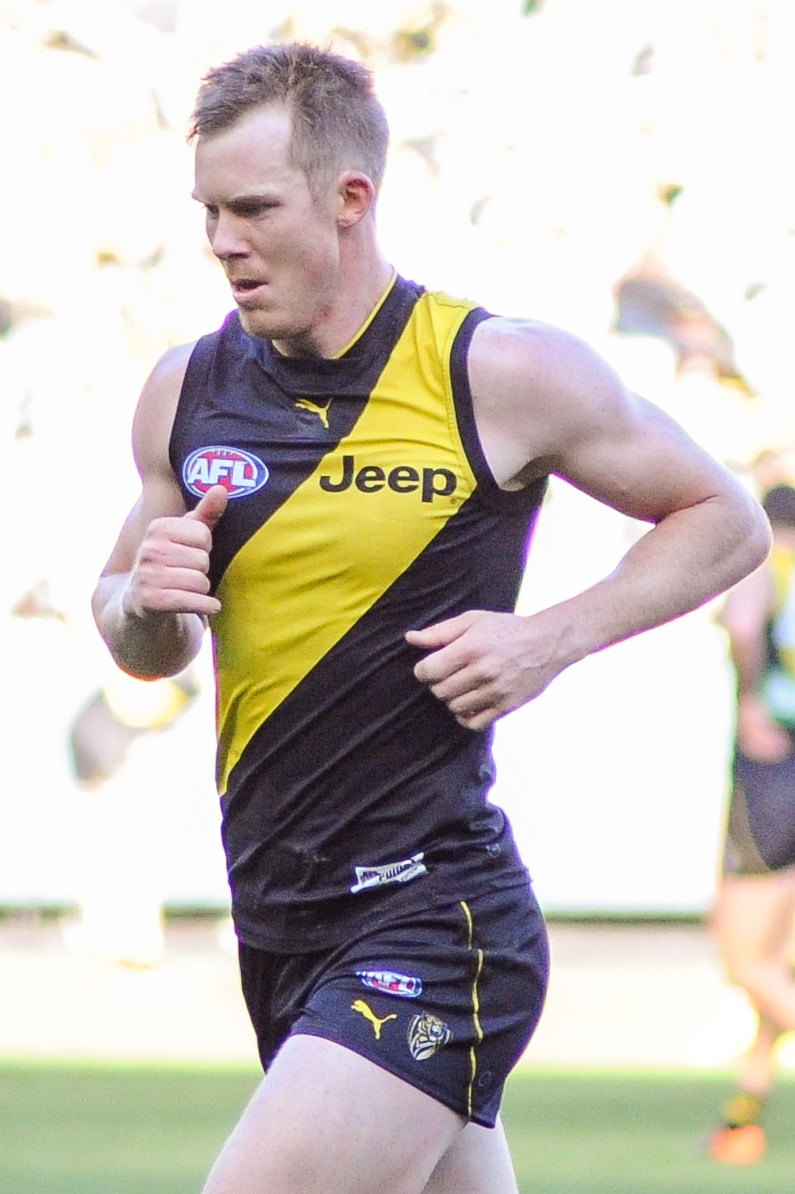
- Riewoldt playing for Richmond in June 2017

Personal information
- Full name: Jack Riewoldt
- Nicknames: Pup, Jumping Jack
- Born: 31 October 1988 (age 38); Hobart, Tasmania
- Original teams: Tassie Mariners (TAC Cup); Clarence (SFL)
- Draft: No. 13, 2006 AFL National Draft: Richmond
- Debut: Round 9, 2007, Richmond vs. Essendon, at MCG
- Height: 195 cm (6 ft 5 in)
- Weight: 93 kg (205 lb)
- Position: Key forward

Playing career^{1}
| Years | Club | Games (Goals) |
| 2007–2023 | Richmond | 347 (787) |

Representative team honours
| Years | Team | Games (Goals) |
| 2020 | All Stars | 1 (2) |
- ^{1} Playing statistics correct to the end of 2023.

Career highlights
- AFL: 3× AFL premiership player: 2017, 2019, 2020; 3× All-Australian team: 2010, 2015, 2018; 3× Coleman Medal: 2010, 2012, 2018; 2× Ian Stewart Medal: 2010, 2012; AFL Rising Star nominee: 2008; Richmond: Richmond vice-captain: 2017–2021; 12× Richmond leading goalkicker: 2010–2018, 2020–2021, 2023; 2× Jack Dyer Medal : 2010, 2018; Fred Swift Medal (4th RFC B&F): 2016; 3× Kevin Bartlett Medal (5th RFC B&F): 2014, 2015, 2021

Jack Riewoldt (/ˈriːvoʊlt/ REE-volt; born 31 October 1988) is a former professional Australian rules footballer who played for the Richmond Football Club in the Australian Football League (AFL). He is a three-time premiership player, a three-time Coleman Medallist, a three-time All-Australian, an 12-time Richmond club leading goalkicker, a two-time Jack Dyer Medallist and a Tasmanian Football Hall-of-Famer. He served as Richmond's vice captain during all three premiership seasons.

== Early life and junior football ==
Riewoldt was born in Hobart, Tasmania, to parents Chris and Lesley Riewoldt.

He was raised in the east Hobart suburb of Bellerive and played junior football for Clarence in Tasmania's SFL. He briefly relocated to the Gold Coast early in his life when his father accepted an offer to play for the Coolangatta Blues with his three brothers in the GCAFL, but the family would return to Hobart a year later. In 2005, Riewoldt made his senior debut with Clarence at age 16, then went on to play with the club through its finals series including a losing grand final where he kicked four goals. The following year he again played in a senior grand final with Clarence, this time a member of the club's victorious side.

He later played and trained with the Tassie Mariners at TAC Cup level and represented his state at the 2006 AFL Under 18 Championships. In three matches at the championships, he kicked a total of eight goals and was named in his side's best players on two occasions.

In 2006, he played eight matches for the Tasmanian Devils in the VFL. One particularly noteworthy game came against Bendigo, where he kicked four goals and took 13 marks.

He attended high school at St Virgil's and Rosny College in Hobart.

Prior to the draft, AFL Media's Matt Burgen labelled him a "goal-kicking forward who is extremely strong overhead." He was however considered both short and slow for his position, with North Melbourne recruiting manager Neville Stibbard later remarking that he did not believe Riewoldt was "athletic or tall enough to play key position at either end (of the field)." Richmond recruiting manager Francis Jackson later recalled Riewoldt's impressive football smarts and his ability to read the flight of the ball as key factors in his recruitment.

== AFL career ==
=== 2007 season ===
Riewoldt was drafted by Richmond with the club's first selection and the 13th selection overall in the 2006 AFL National Draft.

He made his AFL debut in round 9 of the 2007 season, in the Dreamtime at the 'G match against Essendon at the MCG. He did not play the following week, next appearing in the senior side in round 14. He kicked his first career goal as part of a three-goal performance against Port Adelaide in round 16. He would go on to play in five of the final six games of the season, finishing with seven goals from his eight senior matches that year.

=== 2008 season ===
In 2008 Riewoldt established himself as a regular member of Richmond's senior team. He played his first match of the season in round 4 and missed just one more match that season, finishing with 18 matches played. His round 15 bag of five goals against West Coast was a then career-best. He kicked a total of 18 goals, good for fifth best at the club that season.

=== 2009 season ===
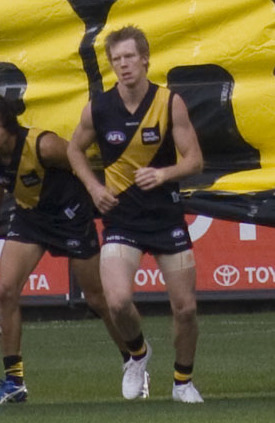
Riewoldt enters the MCG in round 4, 2009

Riewoldt opened a season in Richmond's best-22 for the first time in season 2009, playing against Carlton's in the clubs' round 1 match-up. In the first seven rounds of the season he booted seven goals, before missing the club's rounds 8 and 9 matches. He returned with two goals against Fremantle in round 10, before adding three more in round 11 against the Western Bulldogs. Over the nine games following his absence he would score 20 goals, besting his season total from the year before. Included in this run was a six-goal performance in Richmond's round 17 victory over Essendon. Riewoldt was lauded by The Age's Jake Niall that week for his "footy smarts" and marking ability. He did not miss another game that season, finishing with 20 matches played and a team-second 32 goals. He also placed eighth in the club's best and fairest count.

=== 2010 season ===
2010 was a breakout year for Riewoldt. He started the season strongly, kicking 15 goals in his first seven matches. In the next eight matches between rounds 8 and 15, Riewoldt kicked a league-best 43 goals. It was the highest total over that many games since Matthew Lloyd nine years earlier. He kicked a career best 10 goals in round 12 in a victory over West Coast. The haul included five first-quarter goals, with four coming within the first 11 minutes of play. He became the first player to kick 10 goals in a match since Jonathan Brown in 2007, and the first Richmond player since Matthew Richardson did so in 2004. In round 21 Riewoldt was named best-on-ground for his 17 disposal, 11 mark and seven goal performance against St Kilda at Docklands Stadium. He thus became the first Richmond player to win the Ian Stewart Medal in its seven-year history. For the first time in four-year career, Riewoldt finished the season having played every possible match. His 78 goals was the most by any player in the league, earning him the Coleman Medal and the Michael Roach Medal as the league, and the club leading goalkicker respectively. Four days after winning the Coleman, Riewoldt secured the Jack Dyer Medal as Richmond's best and fairest player. He was also named to the All-Australian team in the position of full forward.

Riewoldt was later selected to tour Ireland and represent Australia in the 2010 International Rules Series.

=== 2011 season ===
Prior to the start of the 2011 season Riewoldt was added to the Richmond's six man leadership group.

Following a six-goal start to the season against Carlton in round 1, he suffered a tougher fortnight to follow. He suffered a concussion early in the club's round 2 match with St Kilda and was substituted before he was able to record an impact in any major statistical category. He was seen crawling up the stairs connecting the change rooms to the field and arguing forcefully to be returned to the match. Riewoldt earned criticism from coach Damien Hardwick in April, told he needed to change his on-field demeanour after being seen yelling at teammate Dustin Martin and giving the finger to the Hawthorn bench in round 3. He was also fined $1,200 by the AFL for the hand gesture. He was criticised by Robert Walls in The Age for selfish play; Walls said Riewoldt had "become an individual in a team sport."

He is one of those players that can turn games in the blink of an eye. He deserves his rating as one of the premier forwards in the competition.

— Sydney coach John Longmire, June 2011

He worked his way into unprecedented form in the following six matches however, kicking four goals four times and bags of five on two occasions. His form remained strong for the rest of the season, despite lower goal kicking tallies the result of Hardwick enacting his pre-season plan to play Riewoldt further up the ground. For the second straight year he won the club leading goalkicker award and played in each of the club's 22 matches. Riewoldt's 62 goals saw him place second in the race for the Coleman Medal behind Lance Franklin. Riewoldt placed ninth in the club's best and fairest count that season.

In September it was revealed Riewoldt had played through injuries all season and would require four surgeries; one on each hip, one on his finger and another on his left ankle. He was also dealing with rib cartilage damage suffered after a training accident.

=== 2012 season ===
Following an off-season of surgeries and recovery, Riewoldt started the season inaccurately, kicking five goals and nine behinds through his first three matches. He was back to his best by mid-season through, kicking bags of six and eight goals in back-to-back matches in round 9 and 10 against Hawthorn and St Kilda respectively. The round 10 victory was Riewoldt's 100th career match and Richmond's first win over St Kilda since 2003. He also kicked bags of five goals in rounds 16 and 20 matches against Gold Coast and the Western Bulldogs. For the second time in three years Riewoldt topped the league's goal scoring race at season's end, securing the Coleman Medal for the 2012 season. He entered the club's final match of the season three goals behind tied-leaders Matthew Pavlich (Fremantle) and Tom Hawkins (Geelong), but booted six goals to finish with 65 on the season and two clear of the pair. Riewoldt became just the second Richmond player to win multiple Coleman Medals and tied Michael Roach's club record in doing so. Through he was selected in the initial nominees, Riewoldt ultimately went unnamed in the year's All-Australian team. He was considered a controversial omission according to Warwick Green and Matt Windley of the Herald Sun. He placed ninth at the club in the season's best and fairest award.

=== 2013 season ===
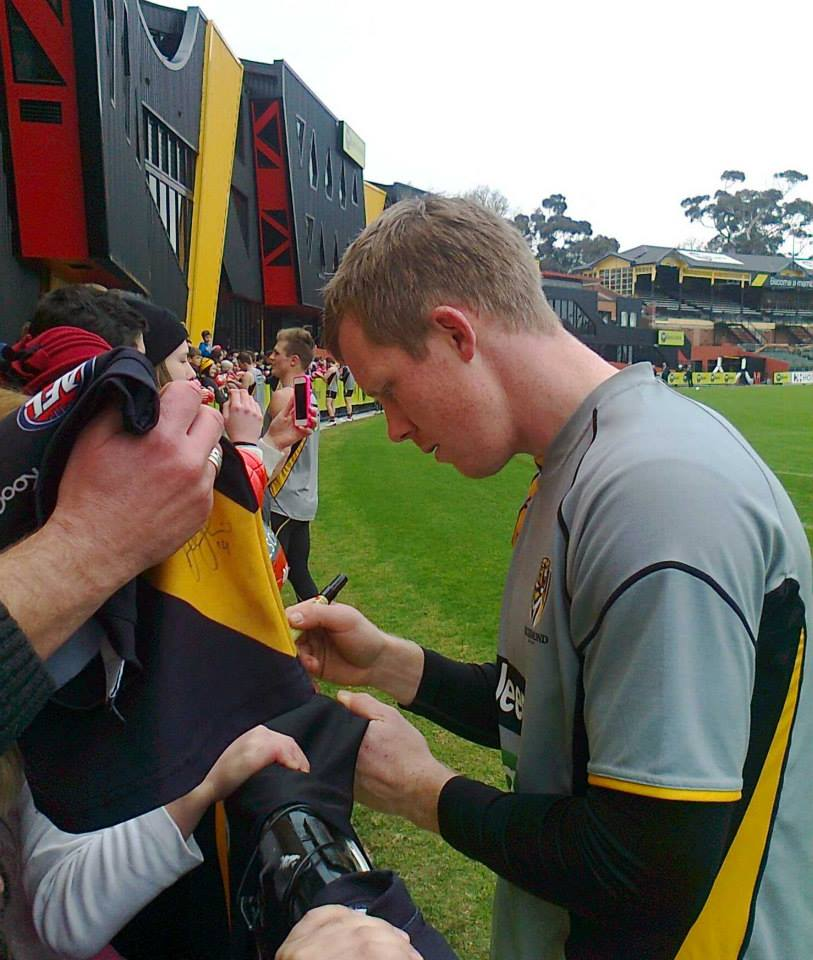
Riewoldt at Richmond training in June 2013

The 2012–13 off-season again saw Riewoldt going under the knife for minor surgeries, the recovery of which forced him onto a limited training load. Before the season had officially begun Riewoldt had already shown his worth, kicking a goal after the siren to win Richmond's pre-season match-up with Hawthorn. During that series he also captained Richmond for the first time, doing so against Essendon in an eight-point victory.

While he was held goal-less in round 1's win over Carlton, Riewoldt responded the following week with a seven-goal haul against St Kilda. He backed up the performance the following week, kicking five more goals in a victory over the Western Bulldogs. Riewoldt attracted media criticism during round 5's one point loss to Fremantle, labelled "a primma donna" by Mark Maclure after he reacted angrily to teammates following the close loss.

All season Riewoldt had been the subject of media speculation concerning his contract and playing future. He was reported to have received offers from Fremantle, but preempted trade approaches by signing a new three-year deal with Richmond in late July.

After 17 rounds Riewoldt was placed third on the league's goal-kicking tally, having amassed 47 to that point. He finished the season with 57 goals, his lowest tally since 2009 but still managed to win a fourth straight club leading goalkicker award. He played in his first career final in September, when Richmond lost to Carlton in an elimination final at the MCG. Riewoldt placed equal seventh in the club's best and fairest count at season's end. He placed third in the league for goal assists.

=== 2014 season ===
In February 2014, Riewoldt was dropped from Richmond's five-player leadership group, replaced by defender Troy Chaplin. This, along with a plan by the coach to play him in a "traditional centre half forward role", saw Riewoldt approaching the season differently than he had in some time. He reduced his playing weight in the off-season, increasing his fitness base while also recovering from minor off-season surgery to his knee and hip.

Riewoldt's performance in the round 1 loss to Gold Coast was labelled "relatively poor" by the coach, with the forward recording less than 10 disposals and only one goal for the first time since round 8, 2012. He was reported for tripping in round 3, but escaped with only a reprimand after the AFL Match Review panel deeming the offence unworthy of suspension.

He was chastised by club officials in May, when he spoke out publicly against the effectiveness of the team's new short-kicking game style. Hardwick jokingly explained to the media that the club had "moved (Riewoldt's) foot from his mouth and my foot from his arse". He publicly apologised via Twitter, and avoided the selection axe as a result. His on-field response was significant, when he booted a career-high 11 goals in Richmond's 113 point win over the GWS Giants in Sydney.

In July, Riewoldt was named at full-forward in AFL Tasmania's Tasmanian Team of the Decade.

For the second straight season, Riewoldt and the Tigers would qualify for the AFL finals, but were again eliminated after just one match. He finished the season having kicked 61 goals and winning Richmond's goalkicking award for the fifth consecutive year. He became just the second player in the club's history to kick 50 goals in five straight seasons, following Jack Titus in 1934–1938.

=== 2015 season ===
After an emotional off-season which included the death of his cousin Maddie, Riewoldt endured an equally emotional round 1. He kicked four goals in Richmond's win over Carlton and was seen dedicating his performance to her memory by pointing to the sky after each of his goals. He hit a strong run of form in rounds 5 to 8, kicking 14 goals and averaging more than seven marks over the four week period. In round 13 he would kick his biggest tally of the season, with six goals against Sydney at the SCG. round 16's match-up with St Kilda was marked as "Maddie's match," raising funds for the Riewoldt cousins' cause Maddie's Vision. He kicked two goals in Richmond's winning side.

All-in-all 2015 proved an excellent year for Riewoldt, winning a sixth straight club leading goalkicker award (54) and setting then career highs for marks and disposals. For the second time in his career Riewoldt earned selection to the AFL's All-Australian team, this time in the position of centre-half forward. He also placed fifth in Richmond's best and fairest, securing the Kevin Bartlett medal. Riewoldt also broke a Richmond record in 2015, surpassing Jack Titus to become the first Richmond player to kick more than 50 goals in six consecutive seasons.

Riewoldt signed a contract extension in late June, keeping him contracted to Richmond through at least the end of the 2019 season.

=== 2016 season ===
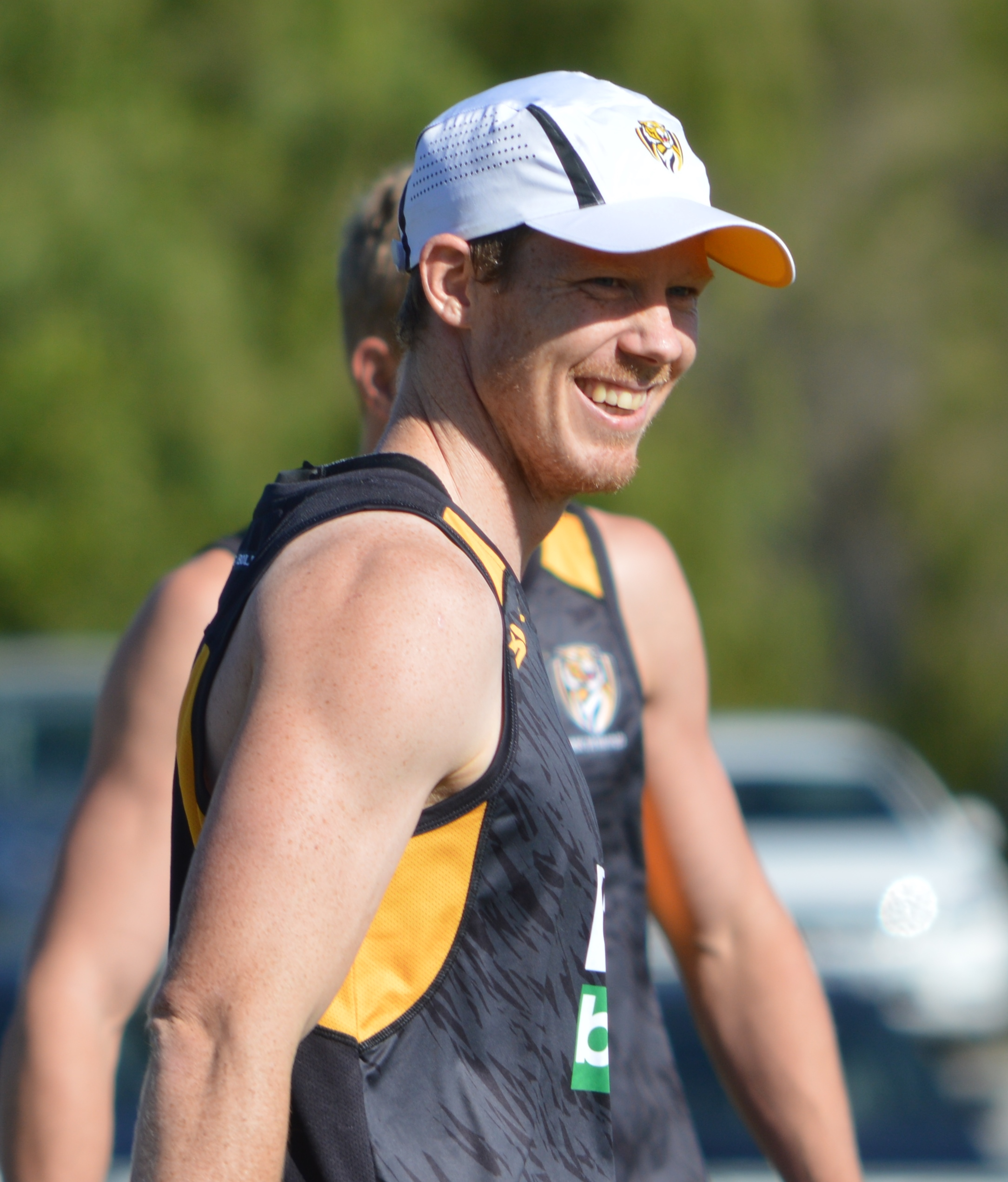
Riewoldt in December 2016

When Richmond captain Trent Cotchin faced calls to resign the position in late 2015, Riewoldt was named as a possible replacement. He quashed the speculation, explaining "I can't even entertain the question (of becoming captain) because in my eyes I think (Cotchin) is the best person to captain our football club."

On-field, the season saw Riewoldt continue his transition to the centre-half forward position. He improved his endurance, agility and leaping ability by shedding weight and focusing on the game further from the goal line. He suffered a minor ankle injury in round 5 and required an intense program of icing and rehabilitation to be ready for his club's round 6 match with Port Adelaide. He played in his 200th career game in round 21's loss to Geelong at the MCG. Riewoldt ultimately played in each of Richmond's 22 games in 2016, kicking a team-leading 48 goals. It was the first time he went without kicking a bag of five goals in a match since his eight-game debut season. He did however set a new personal best in total and average disposals, playing his new role closer to the midfield. Riewoldt placed fourth at the club's best and fairest count, securing the Fred Swift medal as a result.

After what was a year labelled a backward step by the club's coach, Riewoldt was surrounded by trade speculation by media outlets. He reiterated his commitment to the club, claiming he was "yellow and black all the way" despite confirming in later years that he had begun to doubt he would ever achieve significant team success with the club.

=== 2017 season ===
Riewoldt's 2017 pre-season was hampered by lingering injury concerns. He underwent what was expected to be minor ankle surgery in September 2016, before the procedure was changed to a full ankle reconstruction midway through as a result of the surgeon uncovering more severe damage. In November he went under the knife again, this time to repair damage to a previously broken finger. He was appointed Richmond's co-vice-captain in March 2017. He was to share the role with defender Alex Rance, while both served under continuing captain Trent Cotchin

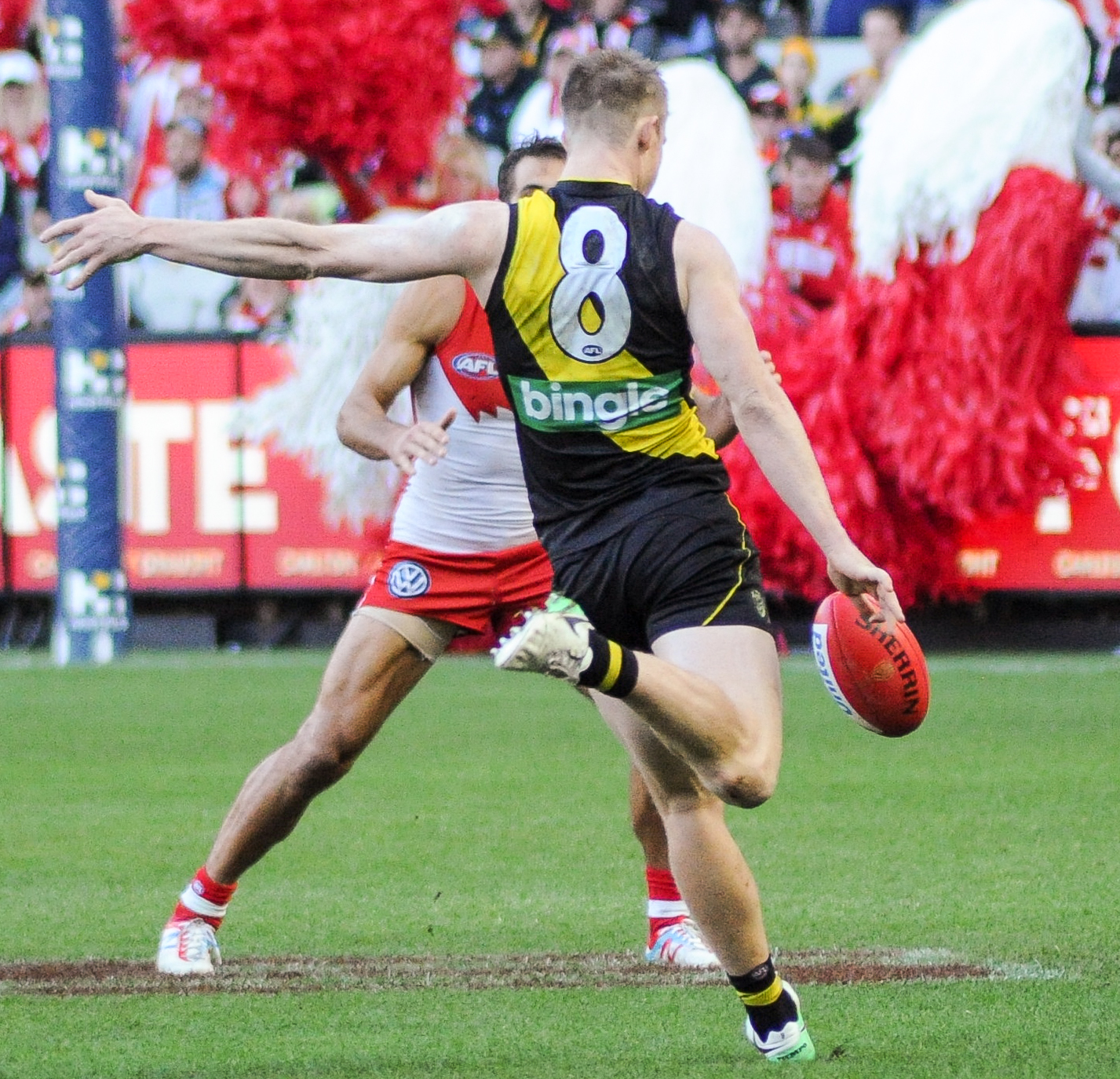
Riewoldt kicks for goal in round 13, 2017

With the free-agency departure of full forward Ty Vickery in the off-season, Riewoldt would necessarily see more game-time in deep forward positions in 2017. In round 1, 2017 he recorded a career best seven tackles in Richmond's victory over Carlton. round 5's Anzac Day eve clash with Melbourne saw Riewoldt kick six goals in wet weather play. He kicked his 500th career goal in round 7, 2017 in a match against the Western Bulldogs at Etihad Stadium. He was the fifth fastest to the milestone in the history of the club. After 11 games and at the mid-season bye, Riewoldt had kicked 29 goals. In round 13 he notched his 214th AFL match, passing Dick Clay for the most games played by a Richmond player in the number eight guernsey. His two and three goal games in rounds 13 and 14 brought his streak of consecutive games with multiple goals to 10. He was the only player in the competition to hold that streak at the time and held fifth place in the year's goalkicking tally. Riewoldt was one of a number of poor performer's in Richmond's round 16 loss to St Kilda, kicking just one goal and gathering seven possessions in the 67 point loss. What's more, Riewoldt's first possession did not come until the eighth minute of the game's second quarter. An accidental poke in the eye from teammate Mabior Chol during training caused Riewoldt to suffer a cut cornea and bleeding behind the eye. The injury resulted in him missing Richmond's round 19 match against the Gold Coast and brought to an end Riewoldt's streak of 86 consecutive games played. He missed a further match in round 20 before returning in round 21 against Geelong. In round 23, Riewoldt played against his cousin Nick in the St Kilda forward's retirement match. He, along with St Kilda forward Josh Bruce, chaired Nick from the ground in a move that was controversial given a second St Kilda player was passed over for the honour. Following finals victories against Geelong and GWS, Riewoldt and Richmond would qualify for the Grand Final, the club's first since 1982. They would ultimately win the match against minor-premiers Adelaide by 48 points, with Riewoldt contributing two goals, six marks and seven tackles. During the post-match celebrations a free concert was performed on the MCG by American rock band the Killers, whom Riewoldt is a fan of. After raising the proposition with club and AFL media managers in the week prior, Riewoldt was famously invited to join the band on-stage to sing their 2005 single "Mr. Brightside". For his performance in the 2017 season, Riewoldt received an eighth-straight club leading goal-kicker award, placed seventh in the club's best and fairest count, first in the league for marks inside 50 and became a premiership player.

=== 2018 season ===
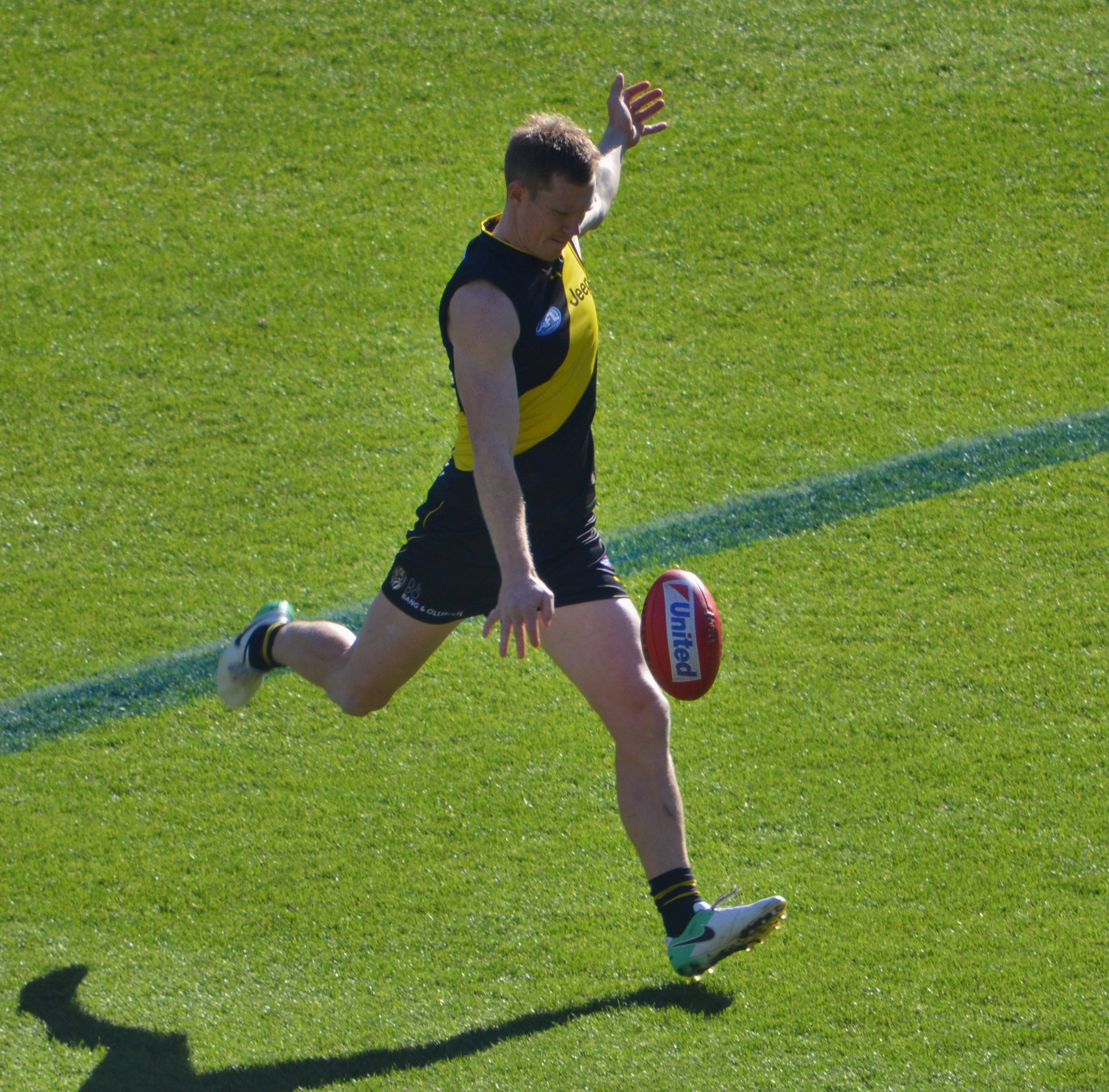
Riewoldt kicks in a pre-match warm up in May 2018

Leading into the 2018 season Riewoldt showed strong goal-kicking form, booting seven goals for Richmond's seniors in an intra-club match against the club's VFL side. From there he went on to play in each of the club's two pre-season matches before kicking four goals in the opening round of the season proper. Riewoldt added another four more a fortnight later, helping his side to a 13-point victory over Hawthorn. In round 7 Riewoldt captained Richmond in a home and away match for the first time in his career after Trent Cotchin was a late withdrawal due to injury. Two weeks later he kicked five goals in a match against West Coast at Optus Stadium. In that same game he laid a bump on West Coast's Liam Duggan late in the third quarter, the result of which saw him coughing up blood at the next break. He had to be medically cleared to fly back to Melbourne with the team that night after concerns were expressed for his health. To that point he ranked third in the competition for total goals kicked (24) behind only Ben Brown (31) and Jack Darling (28). Though he made a full recovery to play the following week, he was unable to make any meaningful contribution after being concussed by a hit to the head during an errant spoil from St Kilda defender Jake Carlisle just five minutes into the first quarter of that round 10 match. Richmond managed a victory despite his absence and Carlisle received a two-match suspension for the strike. Riewoldt did not miss a full match as a result of the concussion, lining up the following week in his side's Dreamtime at the 'G victory over Essendon. In the week that followed, Riewoldt was named in Fox Footy's mid-year All-Australian squad. He was also lauded by Fox commentator Paul Roos for his efforts in blocking, creating space and crashing packs, with Roos labeling him "the most selfless player in the competition." At the end of June he was inducted into the Tasmanian Football Hall of Fame in a gala event in Hobart. Following the mid-season bye, Riewoldt put in one of the performances of his career during a win over Sydney at Etihad Stadium. He tallied career bests in marks (21) and contested marks (seven) as well as kicking three goals and recording 21 disposals in what was a best-on-ground performance rewarded by three Brownlow Medal votes and a perfect 10 votes in the Coaches Association award. Riewoldt received one more vote in that award in round 16's win over Adelaide before attracting another two votes for a four-goal performance against St Kilda in round 18. The following week he set a new personal best with nine inside 50s in his side's win over Adelaide. At the end of July, Riewoldt signed a new three-year contract with Richmond, keeping him committed to the club until at least the end of the 2021 season. Speaking in his regular panelist role on Fox Footy's AFL360, Riewoldt claimed to have taken a pay cut in what was restructuring of his existing contract formerly in place until the end of 2019. In round 20 he kicked four goals, his fifth such total that year. With that match, his 244 career appearance, Riewoldt set the all time VFL/AFL record for games played wearing a number eight guernsey. Riewoldt followed that with his third career ten-goal haul in a round 21 win over the Gold Coast in which he also gathered a career-high 26 disposals and vaulted into league-leading position for goals kicked that season. He added another five goals to his tally in round 23, passing the 600 career goal milestone and earning his third Coleman Medal after finishing the home and away season with 65 goals. He became the eighth player in league history and the first player in Richmond club history to win the award for a third time. He was named in the forward pocket in the AFL's Player Ratings team of the year as well as being named All-Australian for the third time. In Richmond's first final, a win over Hawthorn at the MCG, Riewoldt failed to kick a goal for just the third time that year. He rectified that performance with five goals in the club's preliminary final. Despite his efforts, Richmond would be eliminated from the finals series in what was a shock 39-point loss to Collingwood. Following the conclusion of the 2018 finals series, Riewoldt ranked first in the league for goal and marks inside 50 as well as ranking second for score involvements and fifth for contested marks. He was also named by Herald Sun chief football writer Mark Robinson as the league's best forward and the third best player overall, during the 2018 season. Riewoldt collected a career-best 10 Brownlow Medal votes for his fantastic season and also received his second Jack Dyer Medal as Richmond's best and fairest player.

=== 2019 season ===
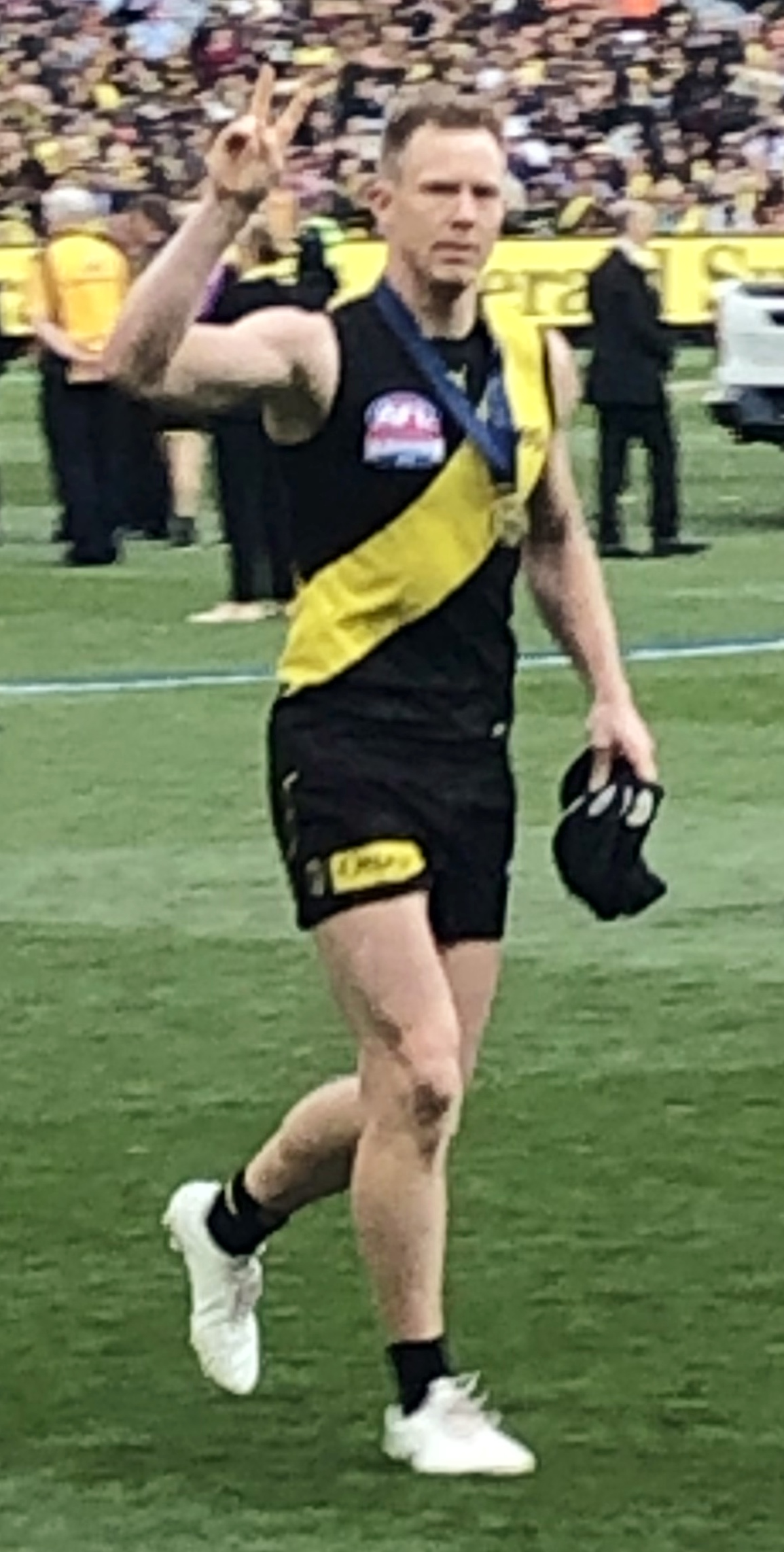
Riewoldt celebrates a second AFL premiership in 2019

In the months immediately following the 2018 season, Riewoldt underwent minor shoulder surgery. He was restricted to running drills in the early weeks of the off-season before returning to full training in December. Riewoldt was at that time labelled by AFL statistics partner Champion Data as the second best key position forward and the 34th best player in the league overall. Over the same off-season the club recruited former Gold Coast forward Tom Lynch to play alongside Riewoldt in the Richmond forward line. Riewoldt' first footballing appearance of 2019 was as captain of the 'Rampage' team at the 2019 AFLX tournament in February. Riewoldt led Rampage to a championship at the tournament, after personally selecting his team at a televised draft earlier that month. Riewoldt followed that with appearances in each of Richmond's two pre-season matches in late February and early March before playing his 250th AFL game in the season-opening match against Carlton at the MCG in late March. He kicked one goal in the match, bringing his career total to 608 and passing Michael Roach for outright fourth place on Richmond's all-time goalkicking leaderboard. In a round 2 loss to Collingwood, Riewoldt suffered an apparently minor wrist injury. He played out the remainder of the match despite the injury, including stints in the ruck. Scans completed the following day revealed Riewoldt had suffered a small un-displaced fracture of the radius and some wrist ligament damage. In the same match Riewoldt also suffered a sprain to the medial cruciate ligament in his left knee. After missing three matches due to those injuries, Riewoldt returned to football and kicked two goals in Richmond's round 6 ANZAC Day eve win over Melbourne. He would suffer another knee injury in the match however, sustaining high-grade damage to the posterior cruciate ligament in his left knee. Richmond club officials said the injury would not require surgery to repair but that Riewoldt would still miss between six and eight weeks as a result. During that match he was also reported for a dangerous tackle on Melbourne's Bayley Fritsch for which he was offered a $1,000 fine. Riewoldt challenged the charge at the AFL Tribinal where he was unsuccessful, with the fine ultimately increased to $1,500. Riewoldt had resumed running by the first week of June, targeting an AFL return against St Kilda later that month in round 15. He missed that target by two weeks, returning in a round 17 victory over the Giants in which he kicked one goal. He added three more goals the following week in his best output of the season thus far, while coach Damien Hardwick praised his unselfish play in support of in-form teammate Lynch through the rest of July. In round 22's win over West Coast, Riewoldt was twice called for a free kick against, after putting his foot into the back of his opponent's back in two separate marking contests. In the week that followed, the AFL announced the rule would be relaxed to only include more dangerous acts likely to cause harm, so that free kicks of the type paid against Riewoldt would no longer be paid. In the final round of the home and away season, Riewoldt kicked four first quarter goals on Brisbane Lions defender Marcus Adams but managed no further goals when later defended by Darcy Gardiner for the rest of the match. After Richmond finished the season in third place, Riewoldt kicked three goals in a 47-point qualifying final victory over the Brisbane Lions. He was considerably less impactful in the preliminary final that followed, recording just one handball as his only disposal in the first half and ultimately going goalless as his side defeated Geelong and won through to a grand final matchup against Greater Western Sydney. In the grand final, Riewoldt kicked a match-high five goals as Richmond won a second premiership in three years, exploiting the lack of speed of Giants defender Phil Davis who was almost a late withdrawal with a calf injury. His haul included three second-quarter goals that had him be the number one statistically rated player on the ground at half time and eventually earned him fourth place in Norm Smith Medal voting for the player of the match. Riewoldt's five goals and one behind (31 points) made him the fourth player in AFL/VFL history and the first player in 59 years to single-handedly outscore the opposition team (25 points) in a grand final.

=== 2020 season ===
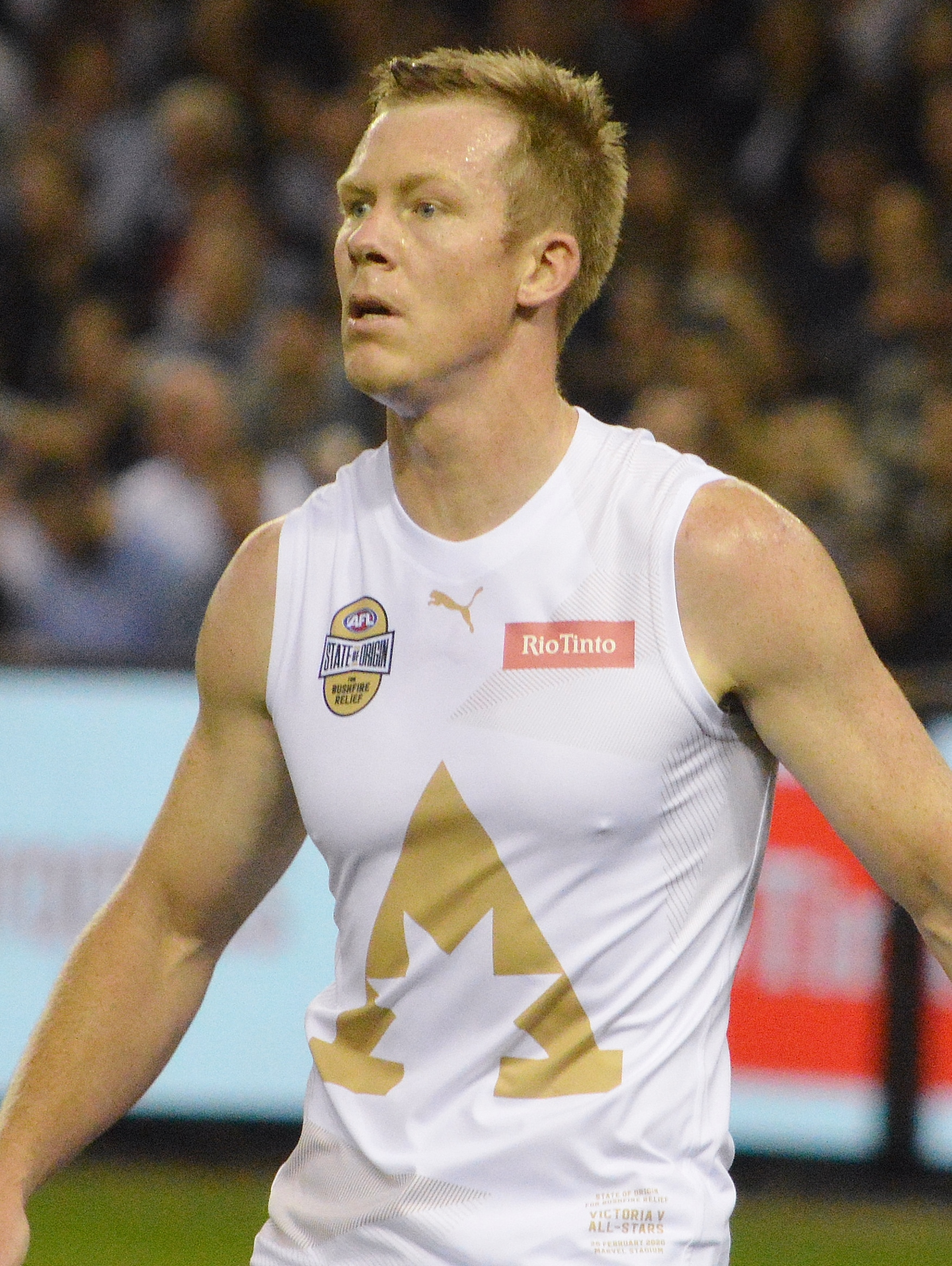
Riewoldt with the All-Stars in the 2020 State of Origin for Bushfire Relief match

Riewoldt played his first match for 2020 in the AFL's fundraising State of Origin for Bushfire Relief Match in February, kicking two goals while representing his home state of Tasmania as part of the allied All-Stars side. He sat out Richmond's first pre-season match that same weekend but returned for the club's final pre-season match against Greater Western Sydney a week later. Despite an uninterrupted pre-season, the rapid progression of the coronavirus pandemic into Australia by mid-March saw the future of the season in doubt, including Riewoldt and Richmond's premiership defence. The AFL commission eventually announced the start of the season would proceed as scheduled, but without fans in attendance due to public health prohibitions on group gatherings. With the expectation that a significant break would be necessary mid-season, the league also announced the season would be completed with a modified 17-round fixture and with quarter lengths reduced by one fifth in order to reduce the load on players who would be expected to play multiple matches with short breaks in the back half of the year. Under those conditions, Riewoldt kicked an equal team-high three goals in a round 1 win over Carlton which saw him named in AFL Media's Team of the Week. Just three days later however, the AFL commission suspended the season for an indefinite period after multiple states enforced quarantine conditions on their borders. Riewoldt attracted media scrutiny for poor performances when the season resumed in early-June after an 11-week hiatus, following goalless matches in rounds 2 and 3. He began a seven-week unbroken goalkicking run the following round, during which time he and the club were relocated to the Gold Coast in response to a virus outbreak in Melbourne. Riewoldt served as club captain for a three-week stretch between rounds 6 and 8, in place of the injured Trent Cotchin. In round 10 he kicked a personal season-best four goals in a win over the Brisbane Lions, before adding another three while captaining the side for a one-off game in Cotchin's absence in round 11. He was one of Richmond's best in round 12, earning one Coaches Award vote for a two-goal contribution in that win over Gold Coast. He earned another nine votes as equal best on ground in round 17's win over Geelong, kicking four goals. Riewoldt finished the regular season having kicked 28 goals, ultimately securing equal-sixth place in the Coleman Medal race. He kicked two goals in the opening match of the club's finals campaign, a qualifying final loss to the Brisbane Lions, before being held goalless and to a season-low four disposals in a semi-final victory over St Kilda one week later. Despite that poor statistical showing, Riewoldt was praised by coach Damien Hardwick for that performance during the week that followed, in particular for an ability to negate opposition intercept defenders in marking contests. Likewise in a preliminary final win over Port Adelaide, Riewoldt earned Hardwick's public praise for splitting marking packs despite kicking only one goal and going without a mark for the first time since 2015. Riewoldt earned more scoreboard recognition the following week, becoming a three-time premiership player while kicking two goals in a 31-point grand final victory over Geelong. Riewoldt also earned a tenth club leading goalkicker award for his 33 goals that year, while placing equal-14th in the club's best and fairest count for a season in which he features in all 21 possible matches.

=== 2023 season ===
On 15 August 2023, Riewoldt announced that he would retire at the end of the season. He, along with fellow retiree Trent Cotchin, played his final match in round 23 against North Melbourne at the Melbourne Cricket Ground.

== Player profile ==
Riewoldt played as a goalkicking full forward and centre-half forward. He was undersized at the position, measuring just 193 centimetres tall. Across the 2010s, he took the most marks inside 50 of any player in the league and scored more goals than any player other than Lance Franklin, while matching Franklin with three Coleman Medals over that time.

In the 2019/20 off-season, Riewoldt was labelled the 13th best player overall in the Herald Sun's list of the best players of the 2010s. In 2020, Riewoldt was named by the Herald Sun as Richmond's fourth best player of the AFL era.

== AFL playing statistics ==
Legend
| G | Goals | K | Kicks | D | Disposals | T | Tackles |
| B | Behinds | H | Handballs | M | Marks |
| # | Played in that season's premiership team | † | Led the league for the season |

| Season | Team | No. | Games | Totals | | | | | | | Averages (per game) | | | | | | | Votes |
| Season | Team | No. | Games | G | B | K | H | D | M | T | G | B | K | H | D | M | T | Votes |
|---|---|---|---|---|---|---|---|---|---|---|---|---|---|---|---|---|---|---|
| 2007 | Richmond | 8 | 8 | 7 | 3 | 34 | 19 | 53 | 25 | 12 | 0.9 | 0.4 | 4.3 | 2.4 | 6.6 | 3.1 | 1.5 | 0 |
| 2008 | Richmond | 8 | 18 | 18 | 8 | 143 | 51 | 194 | 87 | 37 | 1.0 | 0.4 | 7.9 | 2.8 | 10.8 | 4.8 | 2.1 | 1 |
| 2009 | Richmond | 8 | 20 | 32 | 27 | 185 | 73 | 258 | 127 | 48 | 1.6 | 1.4 | 9.3 | 3.7 | 12.9 | 6.4 | 2.4 | 3 |
| 2010 | Richmond | 8 | 22 | 78^{†} | 39 | 219 | 37 | 256 | 123 | 68 | 3.5 | 1.8 | 10.0 | 1.7 | 11.6 | 5.6 | 3.1 | 7 |
| 2011 | Richmond | 8 | 22 | 62 | 26 | 185 | 59 | 244 | 102 | 48 | 2.8 | 1.2 | 8.4 | 2.7 | 11.1 | 4.6 | 2.2 | 2 |
| 2012 | Richmond | 8 | 22 | 65^{†} | 48 | 211 | 80 | 291 | 114 | 57 | 3.0 | 2.2 | 9.6 | 3.6 | 13.2 | 5.2 | 2.6 | 6 |
| 2013 | Richmond | 8 | 22 | 58 | 33 | 215 | 69 | 284 | 112 | 42 | 2.6 | 1.5 | 9.8 | 3.1 | 12.9 | 5.1 | 1.9 | 4 |
| 2014 | Richmond | 8 | 23 | 61 | 38 | 219 | 74 | 293 | 136 | 48 | 2.7 | 1.7 | 9.5 | 3.2 | 12.7 | 5.9 | 2.1 | 7 |
| 2015 | Richmond | 8 | 23 | 54 | 30 | 224 | 76 | 300 | 144 | 52 | 2.3 | 1.3 | 9.7 | 3.3 | 13.0 | 6.3 | 2.3 | 3 |
| 2016 | Richmond | 8 | 22 | 48 | 34 | 227 | 89 | 316 | 141 | 42 | 2.2 | 1.5 | 10.3 | 4.0 | 14.4 | 6.4 | 1.9 | 2 |
| 2017^{#} | Richmond | 8 | 23 | 54 | 37 | 221 | 84 | 305 | 138 | 57 | 2.3 | 1.6 | 9.6 | 3.7 | 13.3 | 6.0 | 2.5 | 6 |
| 2018 | Richmond | 8 | 24 | 70^{†} | 36 | 253 | 88 | 341 | 149 | 60 | 2.9 | 1.5 | 10.5 | 3.7 | 14.2 | 6.2 | 2.5 | 10 |
| 2019^{#} | Richmond | 8 | 13 | 24 | 14 | 115 | 26 | 141 | 55 | 22 | 1.8 | 1.1 | 8.8 | 2.0 | 10.8 | 4.2 | 1.7 | 0 |
| 2020^{#} (Note: The 2020 season was played with 17 home-and-away matches per team (down from 22) and 16-minute quarters with time on (down from 20-minute quarters with time on) due to the impact of the COVID-19 pandemic.) | Richmond | 8 | 21 | 33 | 20 | 136 | 37 | 173 | 75 | 27 | 1.6 | 1.0 | 6.5 | 1.8 | 8.2 | 3.6 | 1.3 | 2 |
| 2021 | Richmond | 8 | 22 | 51 | 29 | 187 | 53 | 240 | 107 | 38 | 2.3 | 1.3 | 8.5 | 2.4 | 10.9 | 4.9 | 1.7 | 8 |
| 2022 | Richmond | 8 | 21 | 40 | 30 | 172 | 59 | 231 | 104 | 40 | 1.9 | 1.4 | 8.2 | 2.8 | 11.0 | 5.0 | 1.9 | 1 |
| 2023 | Richmond | 8 | 21 | 32 | 28 | 139 | 49 | 188 | 94 | 43 | 1.5 | 1.3 | 6.6 | 2.3 | 9.0 | 4.5 | 2.0 | 0 |
| Career | | | 347 | 787 | 480 | 3085 | 1023 | 4108 | 1833 | 741 | 2.3 | 1.4 | 8.9 | 2.9 | 11.8 | 5.3 | 2.1 | 62 |

== Honours and achievements ==
- AFL
  - 3× AFL premiership player (Richmond): 2017, 2019, 2020
  - McClelland Trophy (Richmond): 2018
  - 3× Coleman Medal: 2010, 2012, 2018
  - 3× All-Australian team: 2010, 2015, 2018
  - All-Stars representative honours in State of Origin for Bushfire Relief Match: 2020
  - All-Australian Squad: 2012
  - AFL Rising Star nominee: 2008
  - 2× Ian Stewart Medal: 2010, 2012
- Richmond
  - 2× Jack Dyer Medal (1st RFC B&F): 2010, 2018
  - 11× Michael Roach Medal (Leading goalkicker): 2010, 2011, 2012, 2013, 2014, 2015, 2016, 2017, 2018, 2020, 2021
  - Fred Swift Medal (4th RFC B&F): 2016
  - 2× Kevin Bartlett Medal (5th RFC B&F): 2014, 2015
  - Richmond vice-captain: 2017–2021
- State-league
  - Tasmanian Football Hall of Fame: inducted 2018
  - Tasmanian Football League premiership player (Clarence): 2006

== Personal life ==
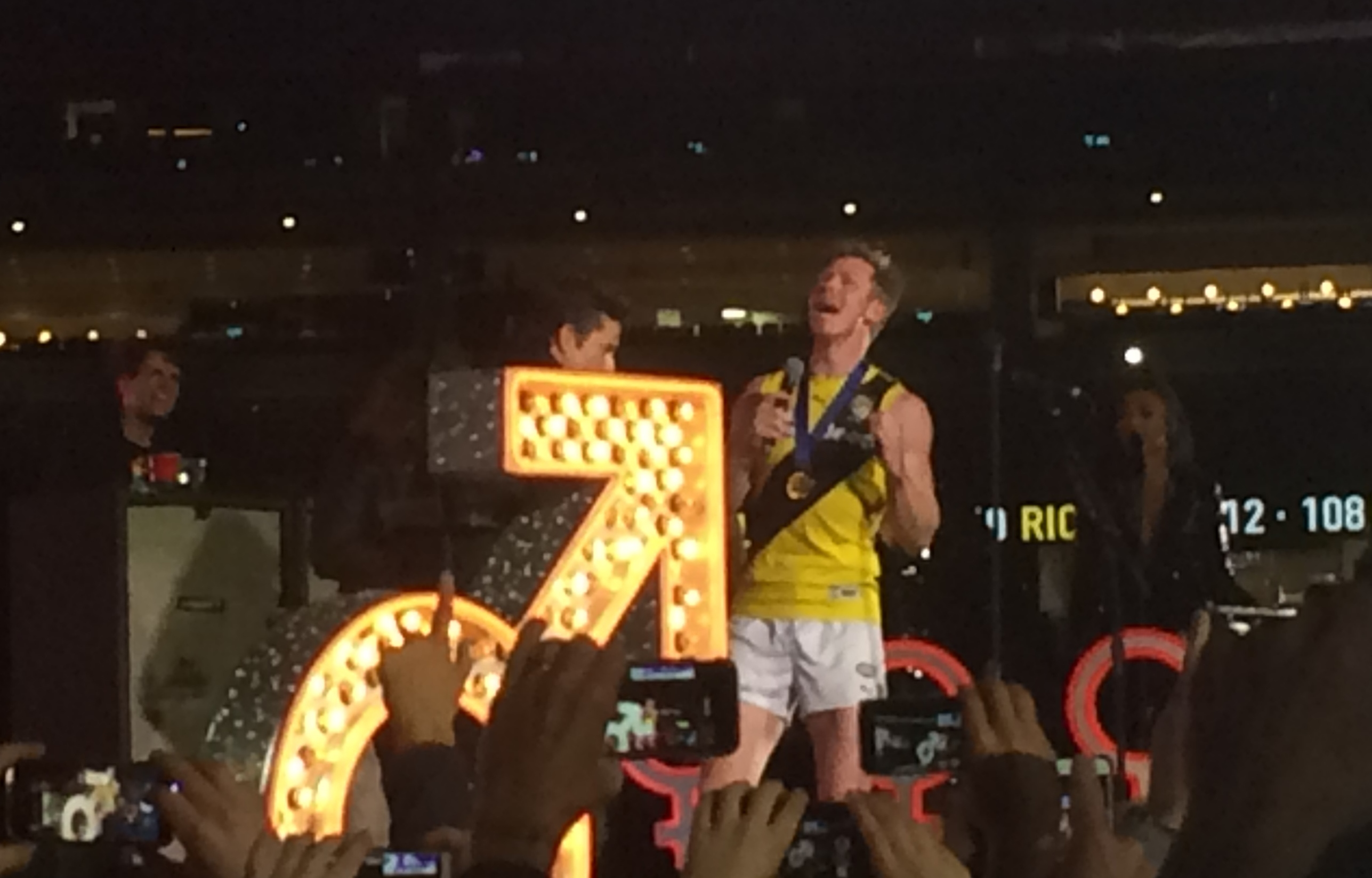
Riewoldt performs on-stage with The Killers following Richmond's 2017 grand final victory

Riewoldt is of German heritage with his paternal grandparents Heinz and Helga immigrated from the European nation in 1950. His father Chris was a 298-game player at Clarence in the Tasmanian Football League, a representative player for the state as well as an inductee to the Tasmanian Football Hall of Fame. Riewoldt's two younger brothers, Harry and Charlie, both played for Tasmania at junior state level. He is the first cousin of former St Kilda AFL footballer Nick Riewoldt.

Riewoldt became engaged to long-time girlfriend Carly Ziegler in 2016, and they were married at a ceremony in Riewoldt's home state of Tasmania in November 2017. The pair's first child, a girl, was born in 2019. In 2021, the couple announced the birth of their second daughter and in 2023 they announced the birth of their son.

Away from the football field, Riewoldt is a keen golfer, once playing off a handicap as low as 0.6. He is also a fan of American rock band the Killers, with whom he performed on stage after Richmond's premiership victory in 2017.

=== Media career ===
Riewoldt appears as a weekly guest on Fox Footy's AFL 360. He appeared as a host on Australian TV show, The Great Weekend in 2019 and in 2020 he hosted his own radio hour on Monday nights on 1116SEN. Riewoldt also appears regularly on Nova 100 Melbourne breakfast radio show Chrissie, Sam & Browny.

=== Cancer scare ===
In 2007 Riewoldt had a cancerous mole removed from his back. He had further tissue removed after the 0.9 millimetre melanoma was confirmed to be cancerous and has since undergone regular check-ups to prevent reoccurrence.

In 2014 he led a campaign by the AFL Players Association and Cancer Council Victoria to "convince men to have difficult conversations about cancer."

=== Maddie's Vision ===
When Riewoldt's cousin Maddie (sister to Nick) died in early 2015 as a result of the blood disease aplastic anaemia, he and the Riewoldt family became public spokespeople for a charity set up in her honour, Maddie's Vision.
