= Ted Langridge =

Australian rules footballer and commentator

Personal information
- Born: 22 October 1936
- Died: 27 July 2016 (aged 79); Adelaide
- Original team: Richmond Citizens
- Height: 171 cm (5 ft 7 in)
- Weight: 76 kg (168 lb)

Playing career^{1}
Years	Club	Games (Goals)
1955–1962	Richmond	94 (149)
1963–1965	Sturt	54 (80)
- ^{1} Playing statistics correct to the end of 1965.

Career highlights
- Richmond Leading Goalkicker 1958, 1961, 1962; Richmond Seconds Premiership Player 1955

Edward "Ted" Langridge (22 October 1936 – 27 July 2016) was an Australian rules football player who played in the VFL between 1955 and 1962 for the Richmond Football Club, and in the SANFL between 1963 and 1965 for the Sturt Football Club.

Following his retirement as a player, Ted was a football commentator on Adelaide TV stations NWS 9 and ADS 7.
