= Courtney Wakefield =

Australian rules footballer

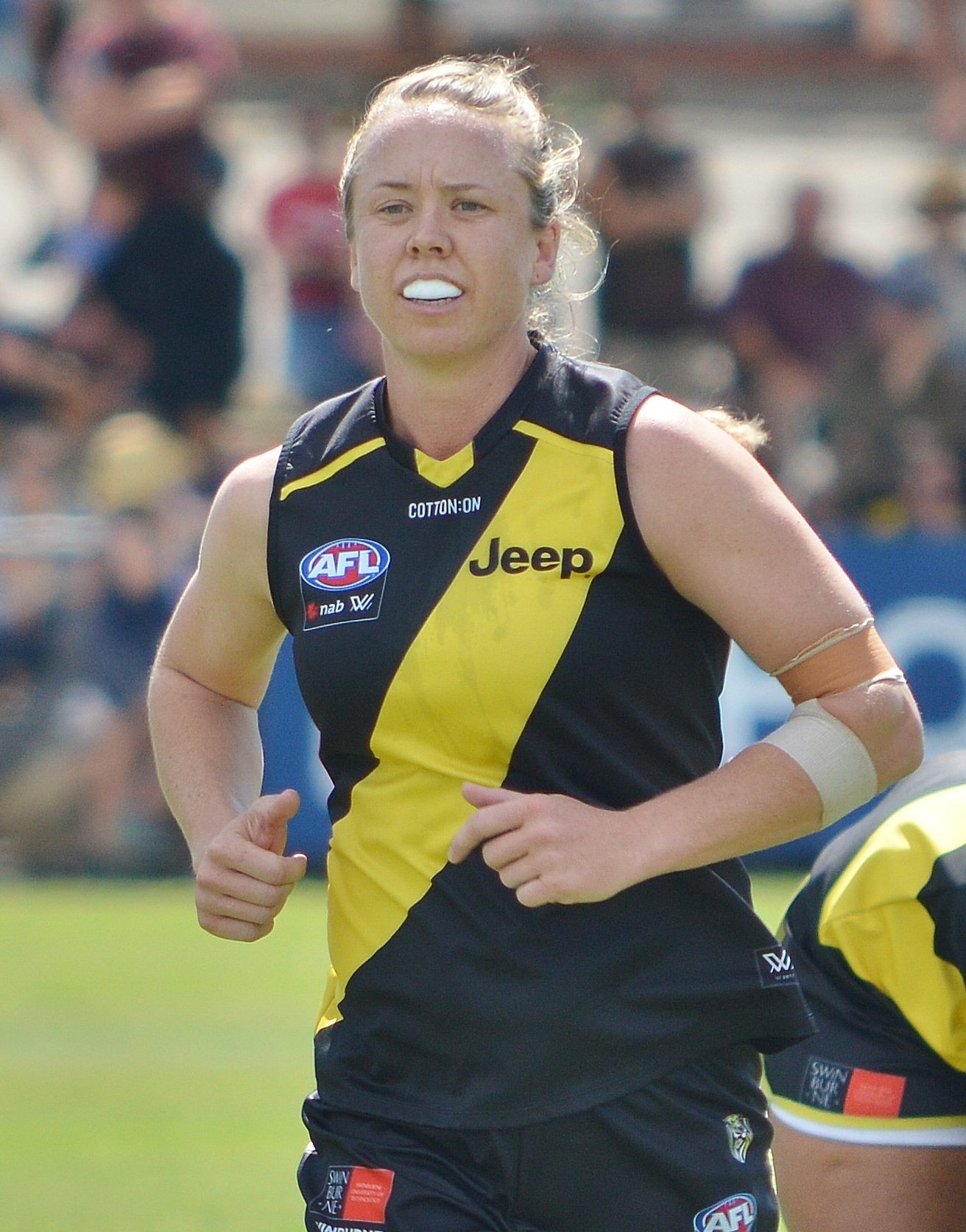
- Wakefield with Richmond in February 2020

Personal information
- Born: 29 March 1987 (age 39)
- Original team: Richmond (VFLW)
- Debut: Round 1, 2020, Richmond vs. Carlton, at Ikon Park
- Height: 180 cm (5 ft 11 in)
- Position: Forward

Playing career^{1}
Years	Club	Games (Goals)
2020–2022 (S7)	Richmond	30 (31)
Total		30 (31)
- ^{1} Playing statistics correct to the end of 2022 season 7.

Career highlights
- 2× Richmond leading goalkicker: 2020, 2022 (S7); AFL Women's All-Australian team: 2022 (S7)

Courtney Wakefield (born 29 March 1987) is a former Australian rules footballer who played for the Richmond Football Club in the AFL Women's (AFLW). Wakefield signed with Richmond during the first period of the 2019 expansion club signing period in May. She made her debut against Carlton at Ikon Park in the opening round of the 2020 season. Wakefield won the team's inaugural goalkicking award, after kicking four goals over the six-match season. Wakefield achieved selection in Champion Data's 2021 AFLW All-Star stats team, after leading the league for average tackles inside 50 in the 2021 AFL Women's season, totalling 2.2 a game. In November 2022, Wakefield announced her retirement from football.

== Statistics ==
Legend
G	Goals	K	Kicks	D	Disposals	T	Tackles
B	Behinds	H	Handballs	M	Marks

Season	Team	No.	Games	Totals							Averages (per game)						
Season	Team	No.	Games	G	B	K	H	D	M	T	G	B	K	H	D	M	T
2020	Richmond	8	5	4	1	27	5	32	19	13	0.8	0.2	5.4	1.0	6.4	3.8	2.6
2021	Richmond	8	9	10	6	49	18	67	23	26	1.1	0.7	5.4	2.0	7.4	2.6	2.9
2022 (S6)	Richmond	8	4	3	2	17	9	26	9	15	0.8	0.5	4.3	2.3	6.5	2.3	3.8
2022 (S7)	Richmond	8	12	14	10	70	34	104	36	42	1.2	0.8	5.8	2.8	8.7	3.0	3.5
Career			30	31	19	163	66	229	87	96	1.0	0.6	5.4	2.2	7.6	2.9	3.2
