= Tom Roach (footballer) =

Australian rules footballer (born 1985)

Thomas Roach

Personal information
- Born: 2 September 1985 (age 41)
- Original team: Carey Grammar/Oakleigh Chargers
- Draft: 37th overall, 2003 National Draft (F/S)
- Height: 183 cm (6 ft 0 in)
- Weight: 93 kg (205 lb)
- Position: Midfielder

Playing career^{1}
Years	Club	Games (Goals)
2004–2006	Richmond	11 (1)
- ^{1} Playing statistics correct to the end of 2006.

Career highlights
- VFL Premiership Player: 2008, 2009; WAFL Premiership Player: 2010

Thomas Roach (born 2 September 1985) is a former Australian rules footballer who played in the Australian Football League (AFL).

Roach is the son of former Richmond champion Michael Roach and was drafted to the Richmond Football Club at pick 37 in the 2003 AFL draft under the father–son rule.

Roach, an on-baller, managed eight games in 2004, his debut season, but played just one game in 2005, mostly playing in the Victorian Football League (VFL) with Richmond's affiliate Coburg. Despite solid form, he struggled to push for selection and managed just two senior games for the 2006 season, both against the West Coast Eagles. In these two games, he collected a total of fourteen possessions – 9 in round 3, and 5 in round 22. These two games took his career total of games to 11, as at the end of the 2006 season. In these 11 games, he had a total of 80 possessions.

At Richmond, Thomas wore the number 8 guernsey of his legendary father for the 2005 and 2006 seasons. The Tigers had hoped for his potential to develop, but after he had struggled to win a place in the senior side in 2006, they decided to delist him.

Thomas Roach grew up in Richmond, Victoria and played for Richmond Junior Football Club up to and including the Under 15s level. He completed the final two years of his junior career with the Greythorn Falcons Football Club where in 2001 he was named the Best and Fairest player in the Colts competition of the Yarra Junior Football League; he was the first and so far only AFL player to have played for RJFC. Which an award is named after him, for being the first AFL player. It is presented to a player in tackers who shows attributes of becoming an AFL player.

In 2007 he joined the North Ballarat Football Club in the VFL, winning two premierships in 2008 and 2009. He then moved to play for the Swan Districts Football Club in the West Australian Football League (WAFL) in 2010, winning a third consecutive premiership in 2010.
