= Dave Lynch =

Australian rules footballer, born 1902

Personal information
- Full name: David Lynch
- Born: 13 March 1902
- Died: 19 March 1958 (aged 56)
- Original teams: Christian Brothers, Abbotsford
- Height: 179 cm (5 ft 10 in)
- Weight: 78 kg (172 lb)

Playing career^{1}
Years	Club	Games (Goals)
1922–1929	Richmond	20 (77)
- ^{1} Playing statistics correct to the end of 1929.

David Lynch (13 March 1902 – 19 March 1958) was an Australian rules footballer who played with Richmond in the Victorian Football League (VFL).

Lynch, a full-forward from Christian Brothers Old Boys, averaged 3.9 goals a game for Richmond, but could only amass 20 senior appearances in his eight years at the club. He began in 1922 with four goals on debut, against St Kilda. After playing in two more fixtures that year and just one in 1923, he didn't return to the team until 1926. He was Richmond's leading goal-kicker in the 1926 VFL season, despite not appearing until round 12 and featuring in just six games. His 31 goals consisted of, in order, 7, 6, 5, 5, 5 and 3 goal hauls. Lynch played in the opening nine rounds of the 1927 season and kicked 32 goals, which found see him finish second in the goal-kicking, behind Jack Baggott. He didn't play a single VFL game in 1928 and played just once in 1929, when he ended his career as he had begun, with four goals.
