= Paddy Guinane =

Australian rules footballer (1939–2019)

- Guinane with Richmond in 1963

Personal information
- Full name: Patrick Guinane
- Born: 31 January 1939
- Died: 8 December 2019 (aged 80)
- Original team: Parade College/St Ignatius YCW
- Height: 191 cm (6 ft 3 in)
- Weight: 95.5 kg (211 lb)

Playing career^{1}
Years	Club	Games (Goals)
1958–1968	Richmond	146 (216)
1969-1970	Dandenong	28 (56)
1972-1974	Caulfield	39 (63)
Total		213 (335)
- ^{1} Playing statistics correct to the end of 1968.

Career highlights
- VFL premiership player: 1967; 2x Richmond leading goalkicker: 1966, 1968; Interstate Games: 2

Patrick Guinane (31 January 1939 – 8 December 2019) was an Australian rules football player who played in the Victorian Football League (VFL) between 1958 and 1968 for the Richmond Football Club.

== Football career ==
Paddy Guinane was a powerfully built key position player who mainly played as a forward. He was vice-captain of Richmond's 1967 premiership team and was the club's leading goalkicker in 1966 and 1968.

From 1969 he spent two seasons with Victorian Football Association (VFA) 1st division side Dandenong. Invited by his former teammate Tony Jewell in 1971 to join him at Caulfield, Guinane was at centre half forward as the Bears defeated Brunswick in the 1973 VFA's 2nd division grand final.

On retirement as a player Guinane coached the Richmond under-19s in 1978-79 and then the reserves in 1980–81, before serving as a Club Board member from 1985 to 1987, and again in 1989.

=== Dimattina incident ===
In the round 15 match against Collingwood, at the Melbourne Cricket Ground (MCG). on Saturday, 6 August 1966, Richmond player Frank Dimattina was chasing the ball somewhere between the forward-flank and centre-half forward, bent over, with his head down, concentrating on the ball, and his hands nearly at ground level, when Guinane, running at full tilt from full-forward, bounced off Collingwood's Mick Erwin, and smashed into Dimattina's head with one of his massive thighs at full force. It was obvious that, for some inexplicable reason, Guinane had not seen Dimattina; and because Guinane was having one of his intermittent bad days, it is most likely he was running to get to centre-half forward, and was looking up the ground into the distance.

Guinane nearly killed him; Dimattina was very, very badly concussed, and had a broken nose. He was replaced by the 19th man, Kevin Bartlett.

== Family ==
Paddy's father Danny Guinane, played 103 senior games with Richmond from 1934 to 1939 and 1942–43. In 2014, Richmond named its Reserves Best and Fairest award the Guinane Medal, in honour of both Paddy and Danny.

== Later life ==
During the 1970s, Guinane was a science teacher at Richmond Technical College, later becoming Vice-Principal. He died in 2019, aged 80.
