= Full-forward =

Playing position in Australian rules football

Full-forward is a position in Australian rules football and Gaelic football with a key focus on kicking goals.

The Coleman Medal is awarded to the player, often a full-forward, who has kicked the most goals in an Australian Football League season.

In modern Australian rules football and Gaelic football, in which players do not strictly stick to a single position, the full-forward is often referred to as a "Key Forward" and can often switch positions with the centre half-forward for "team balance" reasons.

The frequency of players kicking 100 goals in a season has decreased in recent years. According to modern great Leigh Matthews, due to contact penalties protecting intercepting defenders, modern tactics and an endurance style of play, the power forward or stay at home lead-up role of the 1980s and 1990s that was capable of kicking 100 goals a season is no longer a feature of the game at the elite level. In the AFL Women's with 2 less players on the ground, provides additional space for more traditional full forward to lead into, however the reduced game duration and season lowers the overall number of goals they can kick. In Gaelic Football, goals don’t come too often with an average of 1 goal per game in a single match.

== Notable full-forwards ==
=== Present key forwards ===
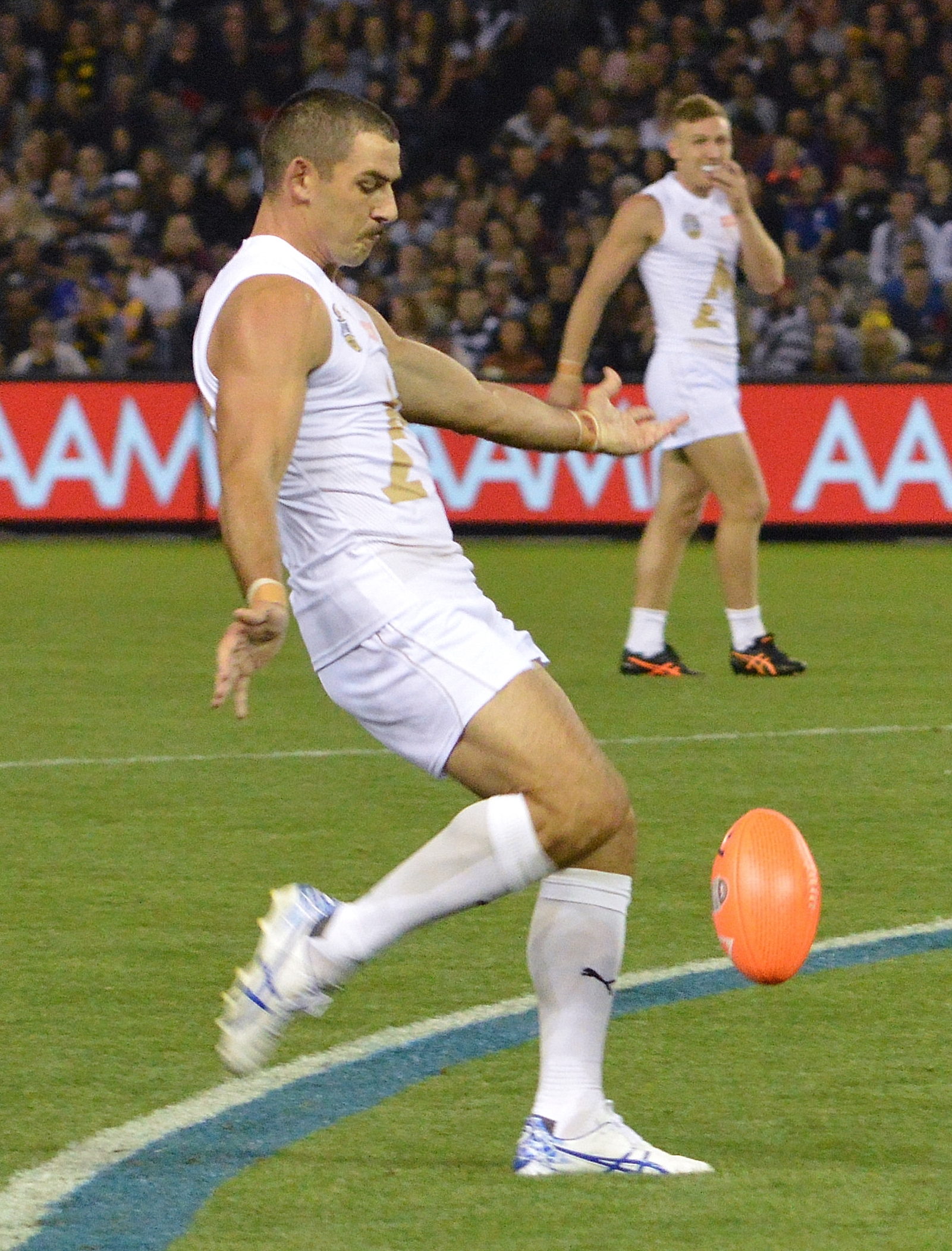
All Stars full forward Taylor Walker kicks for goal from the 50 metre line during the State of Origin for Bushfire Relief Match.

- Charlie Curnow
- Jeremy Cameron
- Jack Darling
- Darcy Fogarty
- Jesse Hogan
- Kate Hore
- Harry McKay
- Jesse Tawhiao-Wardlaw
- Taylor Walker
- Ashleigh Woodland

=== Past great full-forwards ===
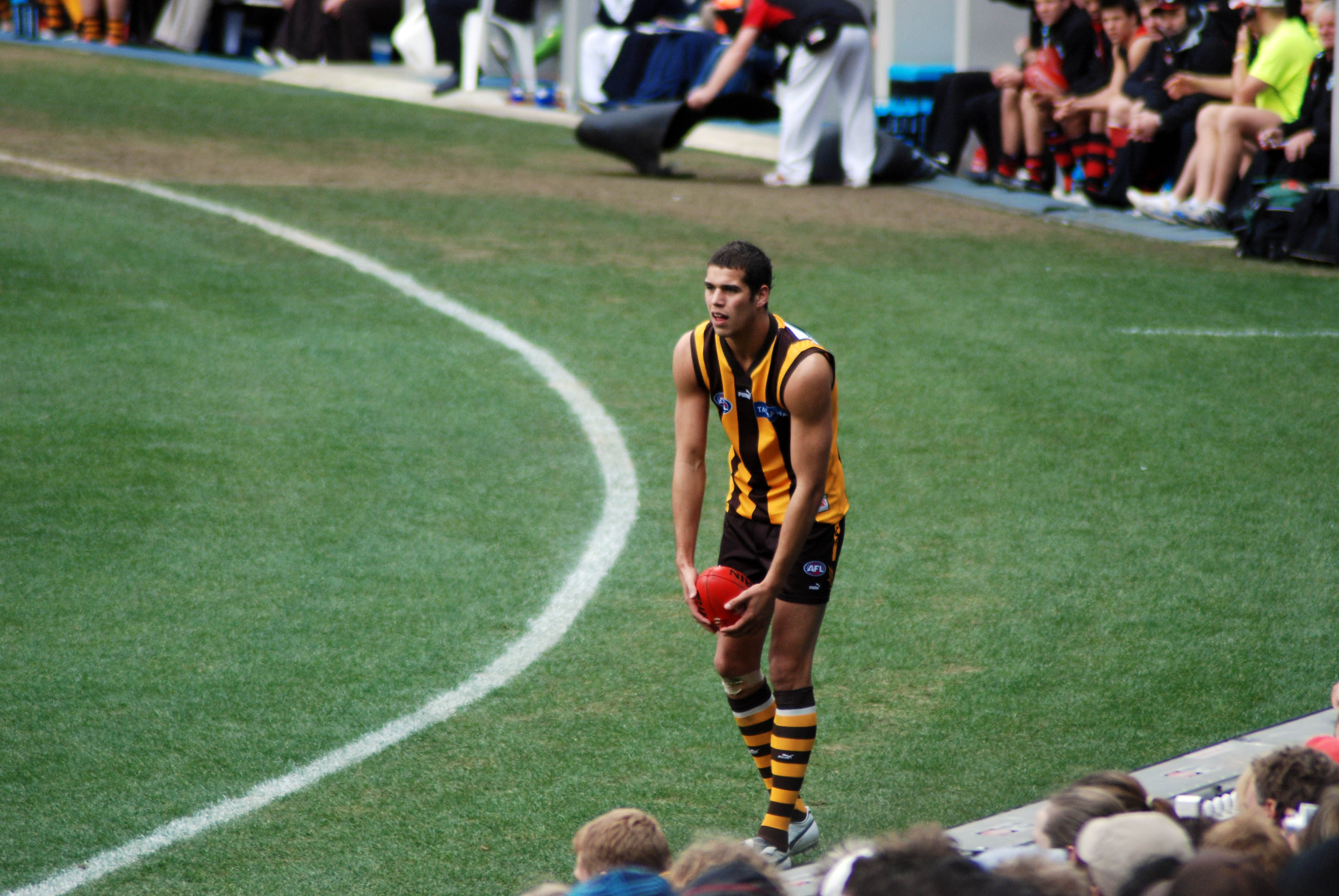
Lance Franklin, the dominant full-forward of the modern era, attempting a difficult kick for goal from outside the boundary beyond the 50 metre line. With more than 1,000 goals, he is 6th-highest all-time VFL/AFL goal kicker.

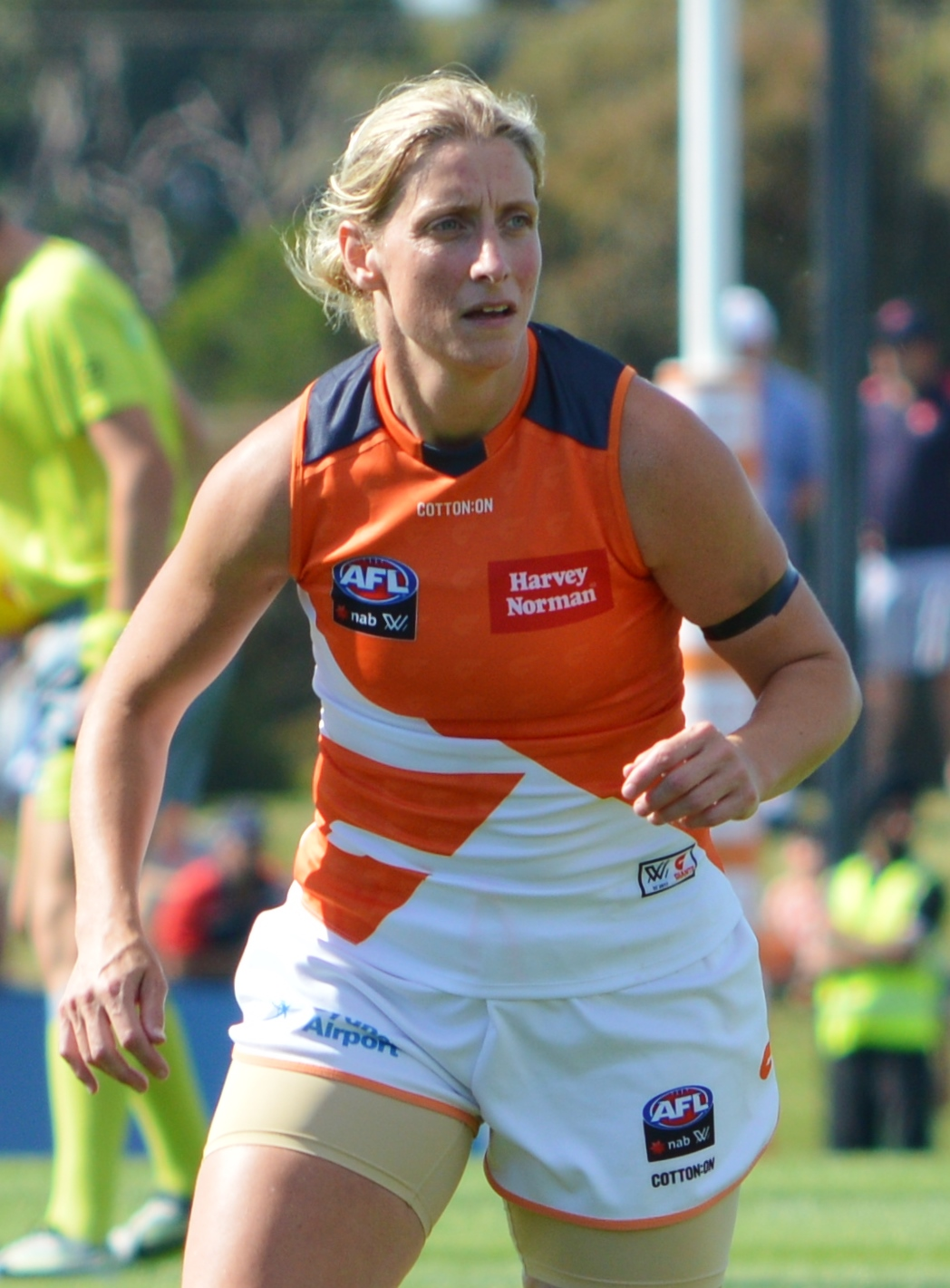
Cora Staunton, one of the all-time great AFLW full forwards.

These are the more notable full-forwards who played in the AFL, SANFL, WAFL and TFL:

- Gary Ablett Sr.
- Malcolm Blight
- Ben Brown
- Bonny Campbell
- John Coleman
- Fred Cook
- Gordon Coventry
- Rick Davies
- Charlie Dixon
- George Doig
- Jason Dunstall
- Tim Evans
- Ken Farmer
- Brendan Fevola
- Lance Franklin
- Fraser Gehrig
- Barry Hall
- Tom Hawkins
- Scott Hodges
- Peter Hudson
- Josh Kennedy
- Dick Lee
- Matthew Lloyd
- Tony Lockett
- John Longmire
- Alastair Lynch
- Peter McKenna
- Jim "Frosty" Miller
- Tony Modra
- Bernie Naylor
- Matthew Pavlich
- Fred Phillis
- Bob Pratt
- Rino Pretto
- Alan Rait
- Matthew Richardson
- Michael Roach
- Austin Robertson, Jr.
- Jack Riewoldt
- Anthony Rocca
- Saverio Rocca
- Bruce Schultz
- Jamie Shaw
- Norm Smith
- Cora Staunton
- Peter Sumich
- Jack Titus
- Doug Wade

== Field Positions ==
Positions on the Australian rules football field
B:	Back pocket	Fullback	Back pocket
HB:	Half-back flank	Centre half-back	Half-back flank
C:	Wing	Centre	Wing
HF:	Half-forward flank	Centre half-forward	Half-forward flank
F:	Forward pocket	Full-forward	Forward pocket
Foll:	Ruckman	Ruck rover	Rover
Int:	Interchange	Interchange	Interchange
Coach:	Coach		
