= Jack O'Rourke (footballer, born 1928) =

Australian rules footballer

Personal information
- Full name: Jack O'Rourke
- Born: 13 July 1928
- Died: 11 April 2008 (aged 79)
- Original team: Richmond United/St Ignatius YCW
- Height: 178 cm (5 ft 10 in)
- Weight: 73.5 kg (162 lb)
- Position: Forward

Playing career^{1}
Years	Club	Games (Goals)
1949–1953	Richmond	44 (134)
- ^{1} Playing statistics correct to the end of 1953.

Career highlights
- Richmond leading goalkicker: 1951, 1952; Interstate games: 1

Jack O'Rourke (13 July 1928 – 11 April 2008) was an Australian rules footballer who played in the Victorian Football League (VFL) in between 1949 and 1953 for the Richmond Football Club.
