= Joe Poulter =

Australian rules footballer, born 1902

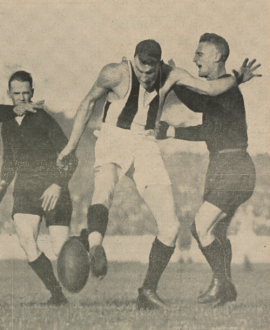
- Poulter during his Collingwood career

Personal information
- Full name: Joseph Leroy Poulter
- Born: 27 March 1902; Greensborough, Victoria
- Died: 28 March 1947 (aged 45); Heidelberg, Victoria
- Original team: Clifton Hill Police
- Height: 188 cm (6 ft 2 in)
- Weight: 86 kg (190 lb)
- Position: Ruckman

Playing career^{1}
Years	Club	Games (Goals)
1923–1928	Collingwood	83 (31)
1928–29, 1931	South Melbourne	37 (23)
Total		120 (54)
- ^{1} Playing statistics correct to the end of 1931.

Joseph Leroy Poulter (27 March 1902 – 28 March 1947) was an Australian rules footballer who played for Collingwood and South Melbourne in the Victorian Football League (VFL).

A regular in the Collingwood side of the 1920s, Poulter was a member of their 1927 premiership team and also played in a losing Grand Final in 1926. He finished his career at South Melbourne, whom he crossed to during the 1928 season. In 1930, before returning to South Melbourne for one final season, Poulter had a stint as captain-coach of Brighton. His son Ray was a successful forward for Richmond.
