= Jeff Hogg =

Australian rules footballer

Personal information
- Born: 15 October 1966 (age 60)
- Original team: Mount Waverley High School
- Height: 190 cm (6 ft 3 in)
- Weight: 88 kg (194 lb)

Playing career^{1}
Years	Club	Games (Goals)
1986–1993	Richmond	144 (306)
1994–1996	Fitzroy	40 (41)
Total		184 (347)
- ^{1} Playing statistics correct to the end of 1996.

Career highlights
- Richmond Captain 1993; Richmond Leading Goalkicker 1988, 1989, 1991, 1992, 1993; Interstate Games:- 1

Jeff Hogg (born 15 October 1966) is a former Australian rules football player who played for Richmond and Fitzroy Football Clubs in the Victorian Football League (VFL) and the Australian Football League (AFL) between 1986 and 1996.

Recruited from Mount Waverley, Hogg played with Richmond's junior teams, and was the Leading Goalkicker for Richmond's Under 19s premiership side in 1985. He made his senior VFL debut in 1986, and played at full forward, winning Richmond's Leading Goalkicker award in 1988, 1989, 1991, 1992 and 1993 and which included a 10-goal haul against Collingwood Football Club in 1991.

Hogg was traded to Fitzroy at the end of 1993 but due to ongoing injury problems, he was limited to 40 games in his three seasons at Fitzroy.

== Career ==
In 2002, Jeff started a company called "BizHealth Consultants" in the corporate health field located in Melbourne, Australia, helping companies in providing a better and a healthy workplace in Australia.
