= Mick Erwin =

Australian rules football player and coach (1943–2026)

Personal information
- Born: 8 June 1943; Stawell, Victoria, Australia
- Died: 11 April 2026 (aged 82)
- Original team: West Heidelberg YCW
- Height: 187 cm (6 ft 2 in)
- Weight: 85.5 kg (188 lb)

Playing career^{1}
Years	Club	Games (Goals)
1962–1965	Collingwood	29 (4)
1965–1968	Richmond	33 (37)
Total		62 (41)

Coaching career
Years	Club	Games (W–L–D)
1982	Collingwood	12 (3–9–0)
- ^{1} Playing statistics correct to the end of 1968.

Career highlights
- Richmond Leading Goalkicker 1965; Richmond Reserves Premiership Player 1966

Michael Erwin (8 June 1943 – 11 April 2026) was an Australian rules football player who played in the VFL between 1962 and 1964 for the Collingwood Football Club and from 1965 to 1968 for the Richmond Football Club.

== Early life ==
Michael Erwin was born in Stawell, Victoria on 8 June 1943.

== Career ==
Erwin crossed to Coburg in the VFA during the 1968 season and was captain/coach from 1969 to 1972, leading the Lions to the 1970 2nd Division premiership. Erwin stepped down as coach for the 1973 season, but remained as captain under new coach John Dugdale. Ahead of the 1974 season, Coburg traded Erwin to Port Melbourne for Peter Smith. Both players won premierships with their new clubs in 1974.

In 1975 Erwin was appointed captain-coach of Diamond Valley Football League club Templestowe, but Port Melbourne refused a clearance and he played a second season for the Borough.

Retiring as a player, Erwin returned to Richmond as a specialist coach for two seasons.

In 1978 he returned to the VFA, as coach of Prahran, taking the Two Blues to the 1978 VFA premiership. He commenced the 1982 season as reserves coach at Collingwood before taking over as senior coach from Tom Hafey after he was sacked in the middle of the 1982 season. He coached the Magpies for the final twelve games of the 1982 season. Erwin, however was not retained as Collingwood Football Club senior coach at the end of the 1982 season and was replaced by John Cahill as Collingwood Football Club senior coach.

== Death ==
Erwin died on 11 April 2026, at the age of 82.

== Sources ==
- Hogan P: The Tigers Of Old, Richmond FC, Melbourne 1996
- Fiddian M: Of Lions and Liniment, Coburg FC, Melbourne 1979
- Fiddian M: The Blue Boys, Prahran FC, Melbourne 1986
