= Ted Keggin =

Australian rules footballer

Personal information
- Full name: Edward Keggin
- Born: 28 July 1891; Richmond, Victoria
- Died: 15 November 1968 (aged 77); Newtown, New South Wales
- Original team: Leopold (MJFA)
- Height: 188 cm (6 ft 2 in)
- Weight: 83 kg (183 lb)

Playing career^{1}
Years	Club	Games (Goals)
1912–1917	Richmond	59 (87)
- ^{1} Playing statistics correct to the end of 1917.

Edward Keggin (28 July 1891 – 15 November 1968) was an Australian rules footballer who played with Richmond in the Victorian Football League (VFL).

== Football ==
Recruited in 1912, by Richmond, from the Leopold Football Club in the Metropolitan Junior Football Association (MJFA), where he had played for two seasons (1910 and 1911), and played in its 1911 premiership team, Keggin, at 6ft.2in. and 13 stone, was a strong mark and a long kick, who played in the forward-pocket and in the ruck.

He was Richmond's leading goal-kicker in the 1912 VFL season, when he appeared in all 18 rounds and kicked 24 goals. He kicked 27 goals in both 1913 and 1914, finishing second in the goal-kicking to Percy Martyn and Clarrie Hall respectively. After not featuring in the 1915 and 1916 seasons due to his naval duties during World War I, Keggin returned in 1917 and played seven games.

He was still actively playing football in 1925, as the captain of the Naval Depot team that competed in the Peninsula Football Association.
