= Danny Guinane =

Australian rules footballer

Daniel Joseph Guinane

Personal information
- Full name: Danny Guinane
- Born: 18 May 1911
- Died: 28 August 1992 (aged 81)
- Original team: South Ballarat
- Height: 179 cm (5 ft 10 in)
- Weight: 100 kg (220 lb)

Playing career^{1}
Years	Club	Games (Goals)
1934–1943	Richmond	102 (1)
- ^{1} Playing statistics correct to the end of 1943.

Danny Guinane (18 May 1911 – 28 August 1992) was an Australian rules footballer who played with Richmond in the Victorian Football League (VFL).

Guinane, a defender, came to Richmond from South Ballarat. He polled eight Brownlow Medal votes in 1939, the second most by a Richmond player behind Jack Dyer.

He was a back pocket in the 1942 VFL Grand Final, which Richmond lost. Richmond were premiers in both his first and last seasons, but he wasn't selected for either side.

Off the field he worked as a tram driver.

He was the father of Richmond player Paddy Guinane.
