= Ray Poulter =

Australian rules footballer

Personal information
- Full name: Ramon Leroy Poulter
- Born: 10 March 1929; Greensborough, Victoria
- Died: 14 June 1999 (aged 70); Surfers Paradise, Queensland
- Original team: Greensborough
- Height: 183 cm (6 ft 0 in)
- Weight: 91.5 kg (202 lb)

Playing career^{1}
Years	Club	Games (Goals)
1946–1956	Richmond	170 (351)
- ^{1} Playing statistics correct to the end of 1956.

Career highlights
- Richmond Leading Goalkicker 1949, 1950, 1955; Interstate Games:- 3

Ramon Leroy Poulter (10 March 1929 – 14 June 1999) was an Australian rules football player who played in the Victorian Football League between 1946 and 1956 for the Richmond Football Club. He was then the captain-coach of Castlemaine in the Bendigo Football League.

The son of Collingwood player Joseph Leroy Poulter (1902–1947) and Vera Daphne Poulter (1905–1971), nee Roy, Ramon Leroy Poulter was born at Greensborough in March 1929.
