= Sebastian Poulter =

American legal scholar

Dr. Sebastian Poulter, who died in 1998, was a distinguished legal scholar, and an advocate of ethnic diversity and its recognition and warning against discrimination and islamophobia.

== Early work ==
After studying law at Oxford, he qualified in 1967 as a solicitor in London. Later in 1967, he was appointed as lecturer (and later senior lecturer) in law in the University of Botswana, Lesotho and Swaziland located in Lesotho. The period from 1967 to 1971 saw the establishment of Sebastian's reputation as a dedicated teacher and the start of his long and distinguished record of research and writing, leading to seven books and some 40 articles.

His early work was about the legal system of Lesotho, especially Lesotho family law. In 1971 Sebastian was appointed lecturer at the University of Sussex and then was reader in law at the University of Southampton, where he remained until 1998. In 1977 he contributed to the drafting of Lesotho's legislation, directed a research project and acted again as Chairman of the Pardons Committee.

== Contributions ==
He influenced the development of law in Lesotho by contributing to the establishment of a legal structure and to the training of many local lawyers.

=== England ===
In England he studied the legal and social position of ethnic minorities, covering civil liberties, family law, criminal and employment law as well as philosophical and political aspects.

The focus on ethnic minority law led to many publications, to advice and expertise being sought by the Commission for Racial Equality and the Runnymede Trust. In 1996 he contributed to debates and discussions about extending the Race Relations Act to cover discrimination on grounds of religion. In 1997 he was co-author of a report of a Commission of the Runnymede Trust on discrimination resulting from unfounded hostility to Islam ("Islamophobia").

About his views, he warned both against islamophobia and against "multi-cultural tolerance'", seen as a shield for oppression and injustice within the minority communities themselves. He argued that the (British and other European/Western) states had to recognize ethnic diversity in the interests of social peace, albeit within the limits of the fundamental principles of the secular democracy. Poulter also strongly condemned all forms of female genital cutting as female genital mutilation.

Starting from the '70's, Muslim organizations in the UK requested that Muslim personal law should be formally recognized as part of the British legal system. Poulter was asked for advice in this by the British authorities. He concluded that this would be impossible for several reasons, among others that it would severely jeopardize the equal rights of women.
