= Percy Martyn =

Personal information
- Full name: Percy James Martyn
- Born: 11 May 1891; Portland, Victoria
- Died: 13 January 1962 (aged 70); Melbourne, Victoria
- Original team: Inglewood
- Positions: Forward, Defender

Playing career^{1}
Years	Club	Games (Goals)
1912	St Kilda	9 (11)
1913–15	Richmond	21 (50)
1915, 1918–21	Essendon	45 (7)
Total		75 (68)
- ^{1} Playing statistics correct to the end of 1921.

Percy James Martyn (11 May 1891 – 13 January 1962) was an Australian rules footballer who played with St Kilda, Richmond and Essendon in the Victorian Football League (VFL).

Originally from Warrnambool, Martyn began his football career with the Inglewood Football Club in 1909, featuring in the team's 1910 Premiership in the Korong Central District Association. Martyn then moved to the city where he started his league career at St Kilda with three goals in both round one and two of the 1912 VFL season. He crossed to Richmond in 1913 and managed 32 goals from just 12 appearances, including a six-goal haul against University (the equal highest match tally for Richmond to that time), to top their goal-kicking. Martyn's 32 goals saw him become the first Richmond player to pass the 30 goal mark in a season. He was noted as one of the best exponents of the place-kick in the game. After playing the opening two rounds in the 1915 season, Martyn transferred to Essendon where he was used as a defender and earned VFL interstate selection in 1920.

The next stage of Martyn's football career took place in Tasmania, starting in 1922 when he was captain-coach of North Launceston for the year and led them to a NTFA Grand Final. In 1923, Martyn joined North Hobart in the same role, and in 1924 he was appointed coach of Devonport.

Martyn then returned to Victoria where he played for and coached Bendigo league teams Eaglehawk and South Bendigo. In 1939 he returned to his original club of Inglewood as coach, even pulling the boots on for a few games at the age of 47. By 1947 he had settled in Inglewood and was again asked to coach the local team, as well as acting as a local councillor from 1955 to 1960. He died in 1962 at the age of 70.

A noted sportsman, Percy also excelled at cricket, where he was a wicketkeeper for the Tasmanian State team as well as a Bendigo representative side which played the English XI in a tour match. He was also proficient at Bowls and Golf.
