= Jack Titus =

Australian rules footballer, born 1908

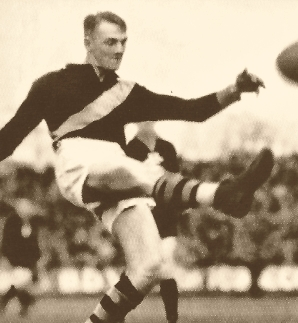

Personal information
- Full name: William John Titus
- Born: 9 March 1908; Maldon, Victoria
- Died: 19 April 1978 (aged 70); North Melbourne, Victoria
- Original team: Castlemaine
- Height: 175 cm (5 ft 9 in)
- Weight: 65.5 kg (144 lb)
- Position: Forward

Playing career^{1}
Years	Club	Games (Goals)
1926–1943	Richmond	294 (970)
1945–1946	Coburg	23 (139)
Total		317 (1109)

Coaching career
Years	Club	Games (W–L–D)
1937, 1941, 1965	Richmond	17 (11–6–0)
- ^{1} Playing statistics correct to the end of 1943.

Career highlights
- Richmond premiership player: 1932, 1934; Richmond best and fairest: 1929, 1941; Richmond leading goalkicker: 1929–30, 1934–42; VFL leading goalkicker: 1940 (100 goals); Coburg: 119 goals: 1945; Interstate games: 14; Australian Football Hall of Fame: 1996; Richmond Team of The Century; Richmond Hall of Fame: 2002; Richmond HOF – Immortal Status: 2019

Jack "Skinny" Titus (9 March 1908 – 19 April 1978) was an Australian rules football player who played in the Victorian Football League (VFL) between 1926 and 1943 for the Richmond Football Club. In the 1930s, Titus was one of the great forwards who regularly thrilled the crowds with his goalkicking feats. A lightly built player who seemed at first glance to be too frail for the robust game of Australian football, Titus proved to be one of the great survivors of the game as he set the record for durability (most consecutive games played) that remained unbeaten for half a century. Titus continued to serve Richmond for decades after his retirement, a fact acknowledged by the Australian Football League (AFL), which annually presents the "Jack Titus Service Award" for outstanding service to the game.

== Playing career ==
Titus originally played football with the Castlemaine Technical School in the early 1920's, prior to playing with Castlemaine. After the death of his father, Syd in 1916, Titus later moved to Melbourne with his mother when he was 14 years old and he was noticed by the Tigers' brilliant committeeman, Tommy Gaughwin and in 1925 at age 17 and was invited to play with the Richmond reserves, then known as 'The Cubs'. However, Titus' build caused concern. At just 175 cm and a bit more than 60 kg, Titus would not be considered a potential talent in the modern AFL, let alone play a key forward position as he did then. The Tigers persevered with Titus in "The Cubs" because of his excellent ball-winning ability and innate goal sense, and hoped that he would gain size as he got older.

Titus' early career was a battle for recognition at a powerful club with a number of excellent forwards. He played five senior games in 1926, and a single game in round one, the following year in 1927, but missed selection in the finals as the team finished runner-up in the 1927 VFL Grand Final.

He attracted notice by winning the reserves best and fairest in 1928, a performance that won him a place in the Tigers' semi-final team. He booted six goals in a match-winning performance and then kicked two goals in the 1928 VFL grand final when Richmond went down to Collingwood for the second consecutive time.

By 1929, Titus had established himself in the senior side's forward line, playing alongside Jack Baggott. He won the club best and fairest award, the Mallee Johnson Cup and led the club's goalkicking for the first time, but was held goalless in the 1929 VFL Grand Final as the Tigers lost yet again. The Tigers used him as a flanker or in the pocket during the next few years as they desperately sought a combination that could break the jinx of a succession of grand final losses. Finally, Richmond broke through for a premiership in the 1932 VFL Grand Final and Titus was a member of the team.

In 1933 and 1934, Richmond faced South Melbourne in two Grand Finals, billed as a battle of the best defence (Richmond) against the best attack (South Melbourne). The Swans triumphed the 1933 VFL Grand Final, but Titus was instrumental in his team gaining revenge in the 1934 VFL Grand Final, with both Titus and his rival Bob Pratt, full-forward both kicking six goals in the match.

For the remainder of his career, Titus was a consistent goalkicker and the team's full-forward, even though he regularly conceded several inches to taller opponents and his weight never exceeded 66 kg. His record emphasises consistency rather than big "bags" of goals, although he did have a number of notable individual performances.

As Richmond's success rate slowed, he maintained his output, scoring 83 goals in 1935, 84 in 1936, 65 in 1937, 72 in 1938 and 48 in 1939. As a veteran member of the team, he provided experienced leadership to younger players. Although supported by larger teammates such as Jack Dyer, Titus played consistently and maintained a durable playing record. His continuous availability and regular selection each week became notable elements of his career.

Titus' golden season came in 1940. He led the VFL goalkicking for the first time as Richmond headed into the grand final for the first time in six years. Needing three goals to become the first Tiger to boot one hundred in a season, he duly got them, but it was little consolation as his team lost the 1940 VFL grand final by 39 points to Melbourne. The next season, he dazzled by twice kicking ten goals in a match (equalling his best personal effort) and winning the 1941 best and fairest and kicking 87 goals, but the Tigers were bundled out in the semi-final. A similar story unfolded in 1942 when Richmond lost the 1942 VFL Grand Final and Titus set a record (still unbeaten) of playing in his sixth losing grand final team.

Season 1943 loomed as a record-breaking year for the veteran forward. He was poised to become the second player to reach 300 games and 1000 goals, and break the record streak of 191 consecutive appearances. He did the latter, but sustained serious injury for the first time, causing him to miss playing in Richmond's fifth and 1943 VFL premiership.

The club then decided that, at 35, his career was over. Without Titus, the Tigers stumbled in their 1944 VFL grand final loss against Fitzroy, when Titus could have offered experience and another forward option. Titus accepted the decision gracefully, even though he was left stranded five games short of 300 and 26 goals from 1000.

Titus joined Victorian Football Association (VFA) club Coburg in 1945 and kicked 119 goals in 1945, where they won all their home and away matches, but then lost both finals. Titus kicked a total of 139 goals for Coburg and then retired in the middle of the 1946 season. In all, he held the following Richmond records at his retirement:

- Most games (since broken)
- Most goals (since broken)
- Most finals games (since broken)
- Most grand finals
- Most finals goals
- Most consecutive games (since broken)
- Most goalkicking awards (since broken)
- Most grand final losses

Titus averaged 3.3 goals per game, and just six players in VFL/AFL history have kicked more goals. Titus's record in finals, where he kicked 74 goals, has been bettered by only two men, Gordon Coventry (Collingwood) and Jason Dunstall (Hawthorn).

== Later career and recognition ==
Following his retirement, Titus served on the Richmond committee from 1944 onwards. Mid-season in 1948 the Richmond seconds were caught short and needed an extra player. Aged 39, Titus stepped up and scored 12 goals, then retired from playing for the last time. He continued to serve the club loyally as a selector, vice president and VFL delegate for the next three decades until his untimely death. In an emergency during 1965, Titus coached the team from Round 4 onwards after the incumbent, Len Smith, suffered a heart attack. He guided the team to fifth place, an important contribution to the Richmond renaissance of the late 1960s. It was his only coaching effort at any level.

A dapper man never seen without a bow tie, Titus maintained his lean physique and always looked younger than his years. Among the recognition for his 50 years service to the Tigers was VFL life membership in 1970 and when the VFL decided to inaugurate an annual award for long and outstanding service to the game, Titus was the first winner. A non-smoker and teetotaller, Titus spent virtually his entire working life running various pubs around Melbourne. He died in 1978 after intervening in an altercation at his pub the Limerick Castle in North Melbourne. (The pub was run by another Richmond player Kevin Morris during the 1980s). The VFL immediately named the recognition of service award after him. Also named in his honour is Richmond's runner-up best and fairest award, the "Jack Titus Medal".

In 1995, much interest centred on Jim Stynes' effort to finally break Titus' mark of 202 [originally thought to be 204] consecutive matches. Some had believed the record invincible, but Stynes eventually extended the mark to 244. Titus' playing number 12 was inherited by Matthew Richardson in the 1990s, who eventually broke Titus' record of eleven club goalkicking awards, another record thought to be safe.

Titus was elected to the Australian Football Hall of Fame in 1996, and in 1998 he was named as full-forward in the Richmond Team of the Century. He was an inaugural inductee into the Richmond Hall of Fame in 2002, where in 2019 he was elevated to 'Immortal' status.
