= Matthew Richardson (footballer) =

Australian rules footballer (born 1975)

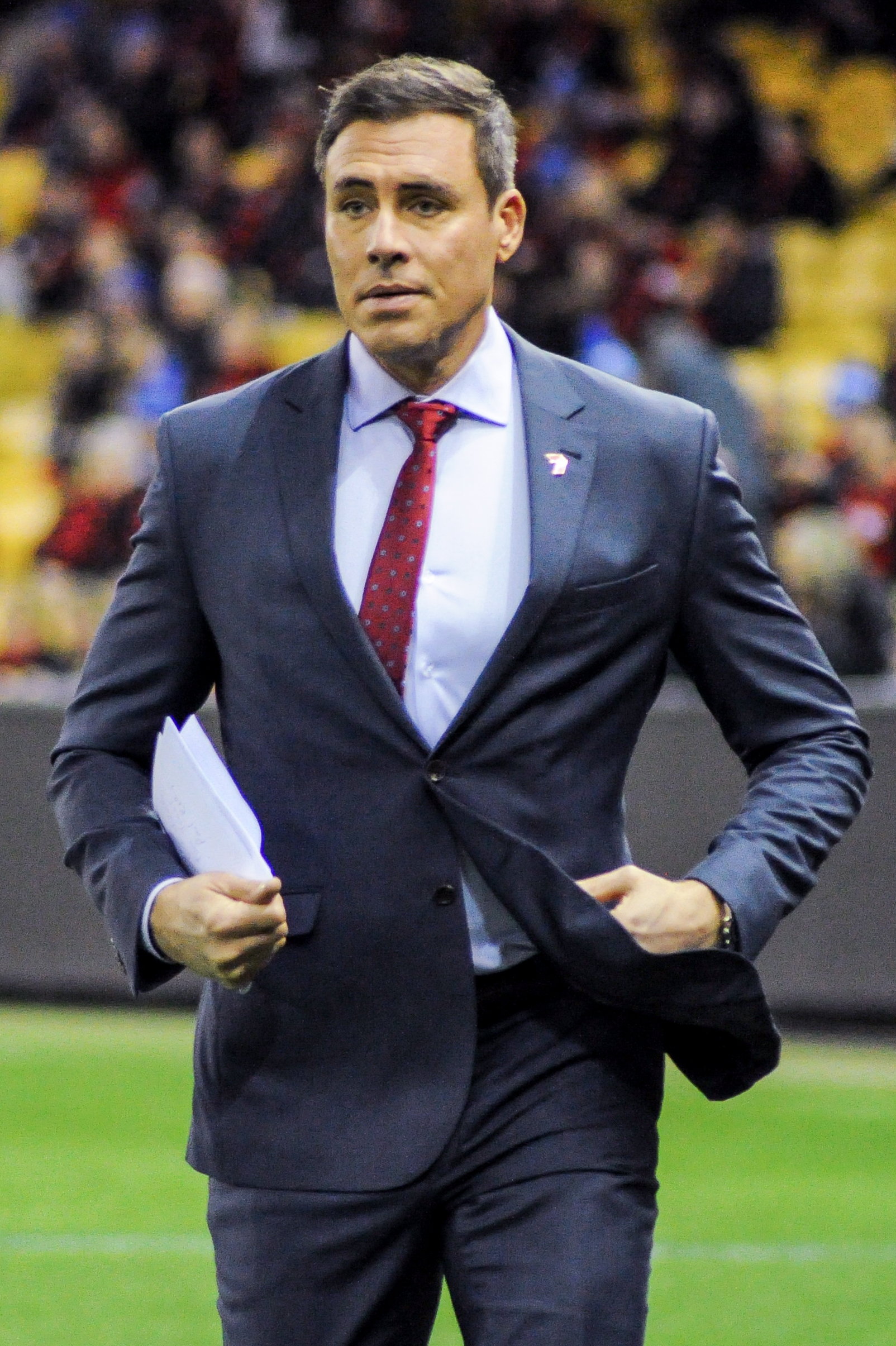
- Richardson working with Seven Network in June 2017

Personal information
- Full name: Matthew Richardson
- Nicknames: Richo, Ricky
- Born: 19 March 1975 (age 51); Devonport, Tasmania
- Original team: Devonport (TFL)
- Draft: Father–Son Selection, 1992; Richmond
- Height: 197 cm (6 ft 6 in)
- Weight: 103 kg (227 lb)
- Position: Full-forward-Wing

Playing career
Years	Club	Games (Goals)
1993–2009	Richmond	282 (800)

Representative team honours
Years	Team	Games (Goals)
1993	Tasmania	1 (1)
1996–1997	Allies	2 (5)
2008	Dream Team	1 (1)

International team honours
1999	Australia	2 (1)

Career highlights
- AFL: 3× All-Australian team: 1996, 1999, 2008; AFL Rising Star Nominee: 1993; Australian Football Hall of Fame; Tasmanian Team of the Century; AFL Life Membership; Most goals kicked at the MCG 464; Richmond: Jack Dyer Medal: 2007; 13× Richmond Leading Goalkicker: 1994, 1996–99, 2001–08; Richmond Team of the Century; Richmond Hall of Fame, inducted 2015; Richmond Life Membership; Representative: Alex Jesaulenko Medal: 1996

Matthew Richardson (born 19 March 1975) is a former professional Australian rules footballer and current media personality who represented Richmond in the Australian Football League (AFL).

On 4 March 2014, Richardson became a member of the AFL's All Australian selection committee.

== Background ==
Richardson is known for his marking prowess, speed and work rate. He was the club's key forward through the mid-1990s and the 2000s. He led the club's goalkicking for thirteen seasons, and was selected in the All-Australian Team three times – in 1996, 1999 and 2008.

Richardson's 800 career goals currently see him ranked second behind Jack Titus at Richmond, and twelfth on the all-time list of AFL/VFL goalkickers. He also holds the record for most goals kicked without winning a Coleman Medal. He currently holds the record for the most goals kicked at the Melbourne Cricket Ground. Richardson was one of the most popular players in the competition; this was shown when the crowd at the 2008 Brownlow Medal cheered every vote he got. Mark Robinson from the Herald Sun wrote "M. Richardson... I'm sure there wouldn't have been a more popular winner".

== AFL career ==
Educated at St. Brendan-Shaw and Don Colleges in Devonport, Tasmania, Richardson was the fourth pick (a father–son selection) in the 1992 AFL draft, and was recruited from Devonport, Tasmania. He is the son of former Richmond and South Melbourne player Alan "Bull" Richardson.

Combining a 197 centimetre frame with speed and athletic capacity, he was a dominant presence for the Tigers. He suffered a torn left ACL in Round 9, 1995, against Sydney at the SCG after he hyper-extended his left knee while landing as he was running out of bounds and crashed hard into the fence and missed the rest of the season after reconstructive surgery on his knee, including the Tigers' finals series – the Sydney Cricket Ground was forced to increase the distance between the boundary line and the fence (which at the time was as short as 2.5m in places) in response to the injury. In 1996 he came back strongly, playing all 22 games and finished with 91 goals (49 behinds), earning All Australian selection for the first time. He sustained another knee injury in the pre-season of 2001, but recovered to play 22 games and kick 59 goals.

In 2004, a decision to step down from the Tigers' leadership group (the small group of senior players who help lead the club on and off-field) and focus on additional strength training paid off, with good goal-kicking form in the early part of the season including a career best 10 against the Western Bulldogs. Richardson finished with a tally of 65 goals for the season. In 2005 he kicked 65 goals again, this time with much more consistency throughout the season.

In 2007, in the Dreamtime at the 'G match against Essendon, Richardson played the game with a fractured eye socket and broken nose sustained only a week before. He still managed to kick four goals, and was denied a potentially match-winning fifth when he was penalised for a push-in-the-back against his opponent, Mal Michael. In the same year, he won his first ever club best-and-fairest, beating young teammate Nathan Foley by a single vote. He averaged 15.1 disposals & 9 marks per game, he also kicked 53 goals for the season.

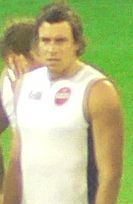
Richardson representing the Dream Team in 2008

Richardson spent a large part of the 2008 season playing on the wing, rather than in the forward line, which allowed him to have a much larger part in the play than previously. Although he did not win the club best-and-fairest, he was selected on the bench in the All-Australian team and finished third in the Brownlow Medal, polling 22 total votes. The 2008 season saw Richardson take 222 marks for the season, including 21 against Hawthorn in Round 20. He averaged 18.2 disposals per game, along with 11.1 marks per game, in which lead the entire AFL for the season and finals. Matthew also managed to kick 48 goals for the season.

In Round 6, 2009 against Sydney at the SCG, Richardson kicked his 800th and last career goal, becoming the eleventh player to reach the milestone in VFL/AFL history. Later in the same match, he partially tore his hamstring off the bone; he missed the remainder of the season with the injury, and announced his retirement after the season. He received a rousing send-off in Round 1, 2010, appearing before the match in Richmond's season opener against Carlton.

Richardson retired in 2009 after 282 senior games for Richmond; he became a Richmond Football Club life member after playing more than 150 games for the club and an Australian Football League life member after playing more than 300 games, including representative and pre-season matches. His career tally of 800 goals was the eleventh-highest at the time of his retirement, and it remained so until Lance Franklin passed him in Round 6 of the 2017 season. Richardson took a total of 2,270 marks during his AFL career, which was the second-highest of any player at the time of his retirement (since the statistic was recorded, starting in 1974).

== Media career ==
It's over, Darce, and it is just an unbelievable feeling...75,000 members and 100,000 here today...(Siren sounds) The Tiges are in the Grand Final! Can you believe it? I can't! But they are!

— Richardson commentating for Seven Network during the end of Richmond's 2017 preliminary final victory against GWS

Following his retirement at the end of the 2009 AFL Season and during parts of the 2009 AFL Season when he was injured, Richardson was an AFL expert commentator for telecast matches and a panellist on the review show 'One Week at a Time', both Network Ten shows.

In 2010, Richardson became part of the Seven Network AFL telecast team, initially as a boundary rider and then as a member of the Friday and Saturday night commentary teams, providing expert comments. He also appears on the Thursday night edition of Seven News Melbourne, to preview the weekend's AFL action, and as a panellist on Channel 7's AFL Game Day. He also is the colour commentator in AFL Evolution alongside Dennis Cometti.

Richardson also works for Richmond's media department, presenting their ‘Talking Tigers’ weekly podcast show and other videos on the club's website.

In September 2017, Richardson became a father for the first time when partner Genevieve Holliday gave birth to their daughter Zoey. The same month, Richardson worked the 2017 Grand Final pitting Richmond against Adelaide as a boundary rider and presented the Premiership cup to Richmond captain Trent Cotchin and coach Damien Hardwick following the Tigers' victory. The following year, Richardson and fellow Richmond legend Kevin Bartlett featured on an official recording of We're From Tigerland.

== Statistics ==
Legend
G	Goals	K	Kicks	D	Disposals	T	Tackles
B	Behinds	H	Handballs	M	Marks

Led the league for the season only
Led the league after finals only
Led the league after season and finals

Season	Team	No.	Games	Totals							Averages (per game)						
Season	Team	No.	Games	G	B	K	H	D	M	T	G	B	K	H	D	M	T
1993	Richmond	12	14	31	24	112	53	165	92	5	2.2	1.7	8.0	3.8	11.8	6.6	0.4
1994	Richmond	12	19	56	40	153	32	185	108	4	2.9	2.1	8.1	1.7	9.7	5.7	0.2
1995	Richmond	12	9	27	3	94	21	115	60	6	3.0	0.3	10.4	2.3	12.8	6.7	0.7
1996	Richmond	12	22	91	49	254	77	331	177	6	4.1	2.2	11.5	3.5	15.0	8.0	0.3
1997	Richmond	12	19	47	35	197	49	246	148	8	2.5	1.8	10.4	2.6	12.9	7.8	0.4
1998	Richmond	12	16	55	41	158	41	199	113	9	3.4	2.6	9.9	2.6	12.4	7.1	0.6
1999	Richmond	12	20	67	41	247	75	322	172	5	3.4	2.1	12.4	3.8	16.1	8.6	0.3
2000	Richmond	12	3	13	8	41	9	50	29	0	4.3	2.7	13.7	3.0	16.7	9.7	0.0
2001	Richmond	12	22	59	36	249	54	303	182	9	2.7	1.6	11.3	2.5	13.8	8.3	0.4
2002	Richmond	12	13	36	21	126	26	152	91	7	2.8	1.6	9.7	2.0	11.7	7.0	0.5
2003	Richmond	12	19	33	34	215	77	292	173	11	1.7	1.8	11.3	4.1	15.4	9.1	0.6
2004	Richmond	12	18	65	50	188	44	232	130	10	3.6	2.8	10.4	2.4	12.9	7.2	0.6
2005	Richmond	12	22	65	46	247	49	296	166	13	3.0	2.1	11.2	2.2	13.5	7.6	0.6
2006	Richmond	12	18	45	40	202	67	269	150	13	2.5	2.2	11.2	3.7	14.9	8.3	0.7
2007	Richmond	12	22	53	40	261	72	333	197	14	2.4	1.8	11.9	3.3	15.1	9.0	0.6
2008	Richmond	12	20	48	30	262	102	364	222	11	2.4	1.5	13.1	5.1	18.2	11.1	0.6
2009	Richmond	12	6	9	13	76	31	107	60	3	1.5	2.2	12.7	5.2	17.8	10.0	0.5
Career			282	800	551	3082	879	3961	2270	134	2.8	2.0	10.9	3.1	14.0	8.0	0.5

== Achievements & Honours ==
AFL

- AFL Rising Star Nominee (1993)
- All Australian (1996, 1999, 2008)
- All-Australian Squad: 2007
- Alex Jesaulenko Medal (1996)
- International rules football (1999)
- Tasmanian State of Origin Representative (1993)
- The Allies Representative (1996), (1997)
- Dream Team Representative (2008)
- Third in 2008 Brownlow Medal [Polled 22 votes]
- AFL Life Membership 2009
- Australian Football Hall of Fame Inductee as Player 2014

Richmond

- Richmond Leading Goalkicker (1994, 1996, 1997, 1998, 1999, 2001, 2002, 2003, 2004, 2005, 2006, 2007, 2008)
- Richmond Team of the Century (Half-forward flank)
- Richmond Life Membership 2002
- Richmond Best and Fairest (2007)
- 100 Tiger Treasures "The Strong & the Bold" Nominee (2008)
- 100 Tiger Treasures "Brave Act of the Century" Nominee (2008)
- 100 Tiger Treasures "Mark of the Century" Nominee (2008)

Other

- Tasmanian Team of the Century (Interchange Bench)

== Personal life ==
His sister, Samantha, was married to retired Hawthorn, Western Bulldogs and North Melbourne footballer Jade Rawlings.

Matthew also has an older sister, Tracey, and a younger brother, Andrew.

In April 2017, Matthew Richardson and fiancée of eight years, Genevieve Holliday, announced they were expecting their first child a daughter. Their daughter, Zoey Isabella Richardson was born on Sunday 3 September 2017.
