= 2013 Richmond Football Club season =

Richmond Football Club
2013 season
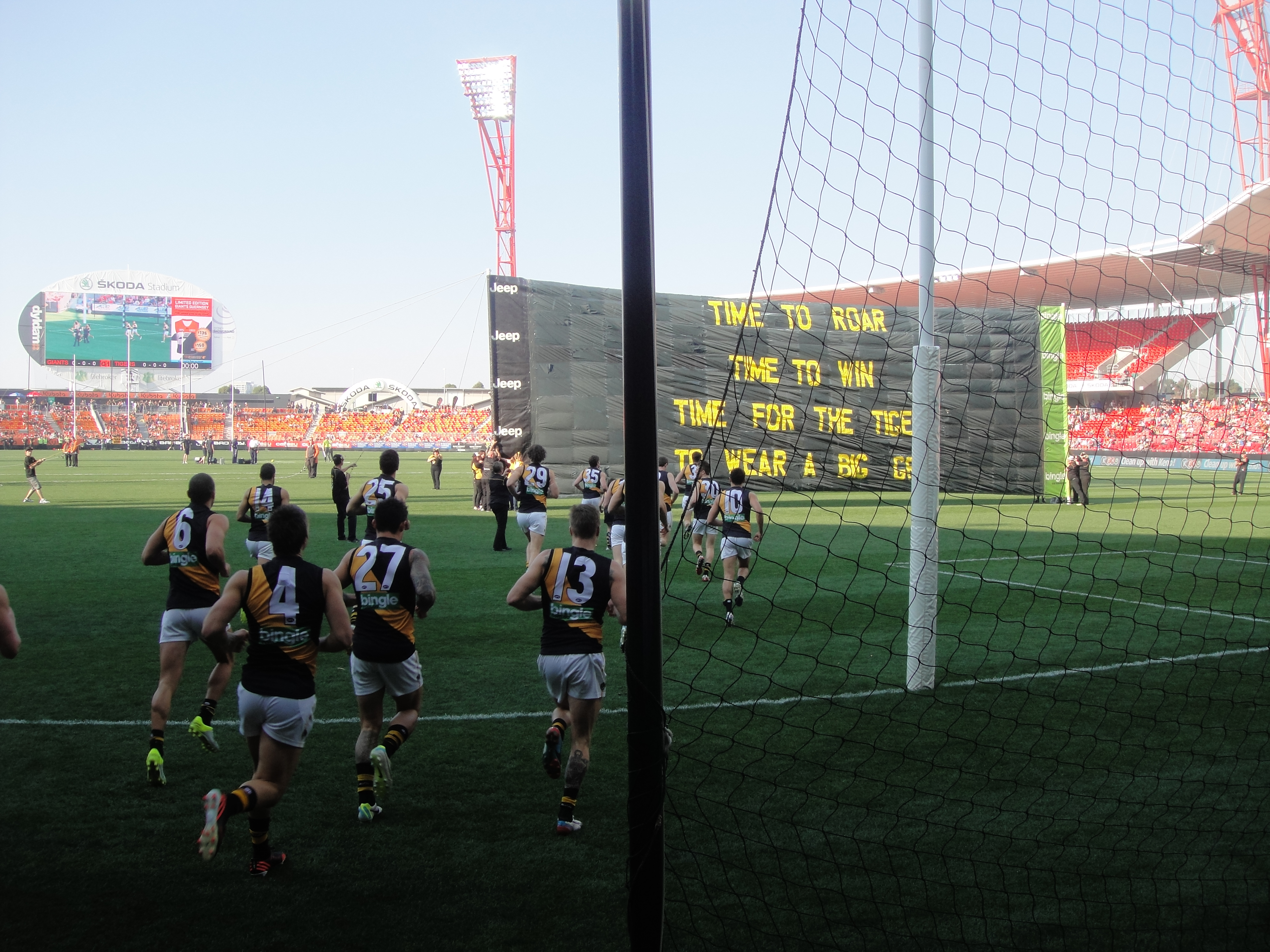
- Richmond players enter Škoda Stadium in Round 22
- President: Gary March^{(8th season)}
- Coach: Damien Hardwick^{(4th season)}
- Captains: Trent Cotchin^{(1st season)}
- Home ground: MCG
- Pre-season: 5th^{(3-1)}
- AFL season: 5th^{(15-7)}
- Finals series: 7th^{(0-1)}
- Jack Dyer Medal: Daniel Jackson
- Leading goalkicker: Jack Riewoldt^{(58)}
- Highest home attendance: 94,690^{(elim. final vs Carlton)}
- Lowest home attendance: 11,197^{(round 16. vs Gold Coast}
- Average home attendance: 50,901^{(▲9,582 / ▲23.2%)}
- Club membership: 60,321^{(▲7,294 / ▲13.8%)}

The 2013 season marked the 106th season in which the Richmond Football Club participated in the AFL/VFL.

== 2012 off-season list changes ==
=== Retirements and delistings ===
Player	Reason	Club games	Career games	Ref.
Kelvin Moore	Retired	87	87	
Brad Miller	Delisted	24	157	
Jeromey Webberley	Delisted	16	16	
Andrew Browne	Delisted	12	12	
Addam Maric	Delisted	10	31	
Dean MacDonald	Delisted	0	0	
Gibson Turner	Delisted	0	0	
Piva Wright	Delisted	0	0	

=== Free agency ===
Date	Player	Free agent type	Former club	New club	Compensation	Ref
1 October	Troy Chaplin	Restricted	Port Adelaide	Richmond	Second round	
1 October	Chris Knights	Delisted	Adelaide	Richmond	-	

Note: Compensation picks are awarded to a player's previous team by the league and not traded from the destination club

=== Trades ===
Date	Gained	Lost	Trade partner	Ref
19 October	Pick 40	Angus Graham; Pick 50	Adelaide	
26 October	Aaron Edwards	Pick 74	North Melbourne	

Note: All traded picks are indicative and do not reflect final selection position

=== National draft ===
Round	Overall pick	Player	State	Position	Team from	League from	Ref
1	9	Nick Vlastuin	VIC	Midfielder/Defender	Northern Knights	TAC Cup	
2	31	Kamdyn McIntosh	WA	Defender	Peel Thunder	WAFL	
2	33	Liam McBean	VIC	Tall Forward	Calder Cannons	TAC Cup	
2	42	Matt McDonough	SA	Small Forward	Woodville-West Torrens	SANFL	

=== Rookie draft ===
Round	Overall pick	Player	State	Position	Team from	League from	Ref
1	7	Ricky Petterd	VIC	Midfielder	Melbourne	AFL	
2	22	Sam Lonergan	VIC	-	Essendon	AFL	
3	33	Orren Stephenson	VIC	-	Geelong	AFL	
3	40	Cadeyn Williams	VIC	-	Murray Bushrangers	TAC Cup	

== 2013 squad ==
Richmond Football Club
Senior list		Rookie list	Coaching staff
1 Chris Newman; 2 Dylan Grimes; 3 Brett Deledio(vc); 4 Dustin Martin; 5 Brandon Ellis; 6 Shaun Grigg; 7 Matt Dea; 8 Jack Riewoldt; 9 Trent Cotchin(c); 10 Shane Edwards; 11 Jake Batchelor; 12 David Astbury; 14 Bachar Houli; 15 Chris Knights; 16 Luke McGuane; 18 Alex Rance; 19 Daniel Connors; 20 Ivan Maric; 21 Shane Tuck; 23 Daniel Jackson	24 Ben Griffiths; 25 Troy Chaplin; 26 Robin Nahas; 27 Aaron Edwards; 28 Jake King; 29 Ty Vickery; 30 Reece Conca; 32 Brad Helbig; 33 Kamdyn McIntosh; 34 Liam McBean; 35 Matthew White; 36 Matthew McDonough; 38 Steve Morris; 39 Tom Derickx; 41 Nathan Foley; 43 Todd Elton; 44 Matthew Arnot; 45 Brett O'Hanlon	13 Ricky Petterd; 22 Sam Lonergan; 37 Orren Stephenson; 40 Cadeyn Williams; 48 Ben Darrou; 49 Steven Verrier; 50 Gideon Simon(B)	Head coach: Damien Hardwick; Legend: (c) Captain(s); (vc) Vice-captain(s); Long-term injury list; Upgraded rookie; (B) Category B rookie; (vet) Veterans list; (ret) Retired; Updated: 18 August 2016; Source(s): Playing list, Coaching staff

== 2013 season ==
=== Pre-season ===
Round	Date	Score	Opponent	Opponent's score	Result	Home/away	Venue	Attendance
1	Friday, 22 February 7:50 pm	1.2.9 (30)	Melbourne	0.2.3 (15)	Won by 15 points	Away	Etihad Stadium	20,309
1	Friday, 22 February 8:55 pm	0.6.8 (44)	North Melbourne	0.7.6 (48)	Lost by 4 points	Home	Etihad Stadium	20,309
2	Saturday, 2 March 5:10 pm	2.8.20 (86)	Essendon	1.10.9 (78)	Won by 8 points	Away	Wangaratta Showgrounds	7,884
3	Saturday, 9 March 1:10 pm	0.13.7 (85)	Hawthorn	0.13.6 (84)	Won by 1 point	Away	York Park	8,601
4	Saturday, 16 March 2:00 pm	14.8 (92)	Western Bulldogs	12.11 (83)	Won by 9 points	Home	Princes Park	2,000 est.

Note: Round 4 matches were conducted under normal AFL Premiership season rules and did not count towards the NAB Cup Ladder.

=== Home and away season ===
Round	Date	Score	Opponent	Opponent's score	Result	Home/away	Venue	Attendance	Ladder
1	Thursday, 28 March 7:45 pm	14.22 (106)	Carlton	14.17 (101)	Won by 5 points	Away	MCG	80,971	9th
2	Friday, 5 April 7:50 pm	14.15 (99)	St Kilda	12.10 (82)	Won by 17 points	Away	MCG	56,783	6th
3	Sunday, 14 April 1:10 pm	20.15 (135)	Western Bulldogs	10.8 (68)	Won by 67 points	Home	Etihad Stadium	44,045	4th
4	Saturday, 20 April 2:10 pm	11.13 (79)	Collingwood	16.17 (113)	Lost by 34 points	Home	MCG	81,950	6th
5	Friday, 26 April 6:45 pm	12.8 (80)	Fremantle	12.9 (81)	Lost by 1 point	Away	Subiaco Oval	36,365	6th
6	Saturday, 4 May 7:40 pm	13.19 (87)	Geelong	20.11 (131)	Lost by 44 points	Home	MCG	55,625	9th
7	Saturday, 11 May 1:15 pm	18.16 (114)	Port Adelaide	10.13 (73)	Won by 41 points	Away	Football Park	25,372	7th
8	Sunday, 19 May 3:20 pm	15.16 (106)	Melbourne	11.6 (72)	Won by 34 points	Home	MCG	39,148	7th
9	Saturday, 25 May 7:45 pm	9.8 (62)	Essendon	13.13 (91)	Lost by 29 points	Home	MCG	84,234	10th
10	Monday, 3 June 5:40 pm	16.7 (103)	West Coast	8.14 (62)	Won by 41 points	Away	Subiaco Oval	37,781	7th
11	BYE								9th
12	Saturday, 15 June 1:40 pm	16.14 (110)	Adelaide	10.12 (72)	Won by 38 points	Home	MCG	43,615	7th
13	Saturday, 22 June 7:40 pm	17.19 (121)	Western Bulldogs	8.13 (61)	Won by 60 points	Away	Etihad Stadium	29,788	6th
14	Sunday, 30 June 4:40 pm	17.17 (119)	St Kilda	8.7 (55)	Won by 64 points	Home	MCG	52,184	6th
15	Saturday, 6 July 2:10 pm	8.18 (66)	North Melbourne	19.14 (128)	Lost by 62 points	Away	Etihad Stadium	45,966	6th
16	Saturday, 13 July 4:40 pm	6.17 (53)	Gold Coast	6.8 (44)	Won by 9 points	Home	Cazaly's Stadium	11,197	6th
17	Sunday, 21 July 1:10 pm	12.12 (84)	Fremantle	8.9 (57)	Won by 27 points	Home	MCG	40,125	6th
18	Sunday, 28 July 4:40 pm	9.9 (63)	Sydney	16.14 (110)	Lost by 47 points	Away	Sydney Cricket Ground	29,738	6th
19	Saturday, 3 August 2:10 pm	16.11 (107)	Hawthorn	9.12 (66)	Won by 41 points	Away	MCG	64,324	7th
20	Saturday, 10 August 1:45 pm	14.13 (97)	Brisbane Lions	11.8 (74)	Won by 23 points	Home	MCG	46,961	6th
21	Saturday, 17 August 1:45 pm	14.12 (96)	Carlton	16.10 (106)	Lost by 10 points	Home	MCG	60,825	5th
22	Sunday, 25 August 3:20 pm	25.13 (163)	Greater Western Sydney	6.6 (42)	Won by 121 points	Away	Showground Stadium	12,314	5th
23	Saturday, 31 August 7:40 pm	15.14 (104)	Essendon	9.11 (65)	Won by 39 points	Away	MCG	60,979	5th

Source: AFL Tables

=== Finals ===
Match	Date	Score	Opponent	Opponent's Score	Result	Home/Away	Venue	Attendance
Elimination Final	Sunday, 8 September 3:20 pm	14.12 (96)	Carlton	18.8 (116)	Lost by 20 points	Home	MCG	94,690

Source: AFL Tables

== Ladder ==
2013 AFL ladder
Pos	Team	Pld	W	L	D	PF	PA	PP	Pts	
1	Hawthorn (P)	22	19	3	0	2523	1859	135.7	76	Finals series
2	Geelong	22	18	4	0	2409	1776	135.6	72	Finals series
3	Fremantle	22	16	5	1	2035	1518	134.1	66	Finals series
4	Sydney	22	15	6	1	2244	1694	132.5	62	Finals series
5	Richmond	22	15	7	0	2154	1754	122.8	60	Finals series
6	Collingwood	22	14	8	0	2148	1868	115.0	56	Finals series
7	Port Adelaide	22	12	10	0	2051	2002	102.4	48	Finals series
8	Carlton	22	11	11	0	2125	1992	106.7	44	Finals series
9	Essendon	22	14	8	0	2145	2000	107.3	56 (Note: Essendon was relegated to ninth due to irregularities in its supplements program during the 2012 season.)	
10	North Melbourne	22	10	12	0	2307	1930	119.5	40	
11	Adelaide	22	10	12	0	2064	1909	108.1	40	
12	Brisbane Lions	22	10	12	0	1922	2144	89.6	40	
13	West Coast	22	9	13	0	2038	2139	95.3	36	
14	Gold Coast	22	8	14	0	1918	2091	91.7	32	
15	Western Bulldogs	22	8	14	0	1926	2262	85.1	32	
16	St Kilda	22	5	17	0	1751	2120	82.6	20	
17	Melbourne	22	2	20	0	1455	2691	54.1	8	
18	Greater Western Sydney	22	1	21	0	1524	2990	51.0	4	

Source: AFL Tables
Rules for classification: 1) points; 2) percentage; 3) number of points for.
(P) Premiers

== Awards ==
=== League awards ===
==== Rising Star ====
Nominations:

Round	Player	Ref
7	Nick Vlastuin	

==== 22 Under 22 team ====
	Player	Position	Appearance
Named	Dustin Martin	Half forward	2nd
Named	Brandon Ellis	Back pocket	1st

==== Brownlow Medal tally ====
Player	3 vote games	2 vote games	1 vote games	Total votes	Place
Trent Cotchin	5	2	0	19	9th
Dustin Martin	3	2	3	16	13th
Brett Deledio	1	3	1	10	30th
Daniel Jackson	2	1	1	9	35th
Brandon Ellis	1	1	0	5	73rd
Shaun Grigg	1	1	0	5	73rd
Bachar Houli	0	2	1	5	73rd
Jack Riewoldt	1	0	1	4	93rd
Alex Rance	0	0	2	2	134th
Shane Edwards	0	0	2	2	134th
Matt White	0	1	0	2	134th
Nick Vlastuin	0	0	1	1	178th
Ty Vickery	0	0	1	1	178th
Total	14	13	13	81	-

=== Club awards ===
==== Jack Dyer Medal ====
Position	Player	Votes	Medal
1st	Daniel Jackson	264	Jack Dyer Medal
2nd	Dustin Martin	255	Jack Titus Medal
3rd	Troy Chaplin	241	Maurie Fleming Medal
4th	Brett Deledio	238	Fred Swift Medal
5th	Trent Cotchin	237	Kevin Bartlett Medal
6th	Alex Rance	231	Fred Swift Medal
7th	Steven Morris	211	
7th	Jack Riewoldt	211	
9th	Shaun Grigg	191	
10th	Bachar Houli	187	

==== Michael Roach Medal ====
Position	Player	Goals
1st	Jack Riewoldt	58
2nd	Ty Vickery	27
3rd	Dustin Martin	23
4th	Jake King	21
5th	Luke McGuane	20
