= Havlík =

Havlík (feminine: Havlíková) is a Czech and Slovak surname, a diminutive of Havel. Notable people with the surname include:

- Adam Havlík (born 1991), Czech ice hockey player
- Ferdinand Havlík (1928–2013), Czech clarinetist and composer
- Herbert Havlik (born 1946), Austrian sprint canoer
- Ján Havlík (1928–1965), Slovak Catholic seminarian
- Pavla Havlíková (born 1983), Czech racing cyclist
- Štefan Havlík (born 1975), Slovak bodybuilder and soldier
- Vladimír Havlík (born 1959), Czech action artist
- Vlastimil Havlík (born 1957), Czech basketball player

== See also ==
- Havlík's law, a linguistic paradigm dealing with the reduced vowels in Proto-Slavic
- Havlíček
