= Havlíček =

Havlíček (feminine: Havlíčková) is a Czech surname, a diminutive of Havel. Anglicized and Germanized forms of the name are Havlicek and Hawlicek. Notable people with the surname include:

- Aneta Havlíčková (born 1987), Czech volleyball player
- Barbora Havlíčková (born 2000), Czech skier
- Bedřich Havlíček (1922–1994), Czech historian
- Daniela Havlíčková (1946–1999), Czech printmaker
- Eduard Havlicek (1912–?), Austrian football player and coach
- Hilde Hawlicek (born 1942), Austrian politician
- Iveta Havlíčková (born 1961), Czech rhythmic gymnast
- Jan Havlíček, Czech canoeist
- Jaroslav Havlíček (1896–1943), Czech novelist
- Jiří Havlíček (born 1976), Czech economist and politician
- John Havlicek (1940–2019), American basketball player
- Karel Havlíček (artist) (1907–1988), Czech artist
- Karel Havlíček (politician) (born 1969), Czech politician
- Karel Havlíček Borovský (1821–1856), Czech writer and journalist
- Kateřina Havlíčková (born 1985), Czech slalom canoeist
- Lucie Havlíčková (born 2005), Czech tennis player
- Marián Havlíček (1953–1972), Slovak slalom canoeist
- Maxim Havlíček, Czech-American painter
- Peter Havlicek (born 1963), Austrian musician

== See also ==
- Havlík
