= Radek Havel =

Radek Havel may refer to:

- Radek Havel (ice hockey) (born 1994), Czech ice hockey player
- Radek Havel (swimmer) (born 1961), Czech swimmer
