= Hevel =

Hevel may refer to:

- A variant of Abel (given name)
  - Abel of Cain and Abel
- Hector Hevel (born 1996), Dutch footballer
- Johannes Hevel or Johannes Hevelius (1611–1687), Polish astronomer and politician
- Jules Van Hevel or Jules Vanhevel (1895–1969), Belgian cyclist
- A Hebrew word found in Ecclesiastes
- Hevel, a 1989–1990 artwork by Larry Abramson

== See also ==
- Havel (disambiguation)
- Heval, documentary film on Michael Enright
- Walther Hewel, personal friend of Adolf Hitler
