= Bodybuilding at the 2001 World Games – Men's +80 kg =

Bodybuilding men's +80 kg at the World Games
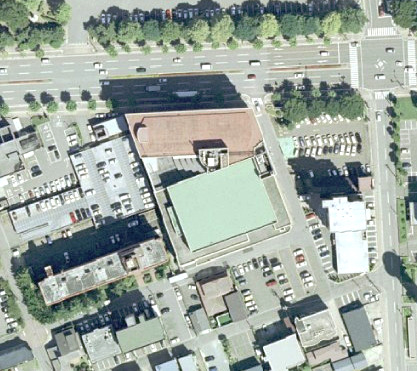
- Akita City Culture Hall
- Venue: Akita City Culture Hall, Akita, Japan
- Date: 18–19 August 2001
- Competitors: 9 from 9 nations

Medalists
1st place, gold medalist(s)		Olegas Žuras	Lithuania
2nd place, silver medalist(s)		Thomas Scheu	Germany
3rd place, bronze medalist(s)		Manfred Petautschnig	Austria

The men's +80 kg event in bodybuilding at the 2001 World Games in Akita was played from 18 to 19 August. The bodybuilding competition took place at Akita City Culture Hall.

== Competition format ==
A total of 9 athletes entered the competition.

== Results ==
Rank	Athlete	Nation
1st place, gold medalist(s)	Olegas Žuras	Lithuania
2nd place, silver medalist(s)	Thomas Scheu	Germany
3rd place, bronze medalist(s)	Manfred Petautschnig	Austria
4	Stefan Havlik	Slovakia
5	Carlton La Cour	United States
6	Hiroshi Inoue	Japan
7	Winston Green	Canada
8	Augustine Lee Kong Seong	Singapore
	Oleg Protas	Ukraine
