= Havel (name) =

Havel (feminine: Havlová) is a Czech surname and given name. The given name was derived from the Latin name Gallus, meaning 'inhabitant of Gaul', and the surname was derived from the given name. Notable people with the name include:

== Surname ==
- Dagmar Havlová (born 1953), Czech actress, First Lady of the Czech Republic
- Daniel Havel (born 1991), Czech sprint canoeist
- Gustav Havel (1930–1967), Czech motorcycle road racer
- Hippolyte Havel (1871–1950), Czech-American anarchist
- Ivan M. Havel (1938–2011), Czech scientist and philosopher
- Jan Havel (born 1942), Czech ice hockey player
- Jana Havlová (born 1978), Czech volleyball player
- Joseph Havel (born 1954), American sculptor
- Lukáš Havel (footballer) (born 1996), Czech footballer
- Lukáš Havel (ice hockey) (born 1981), Czech ice hockey player
- Milan Havel (born 1994), Czech footballer
- Miloš Havel (1899–1968), Czech film producer and studio executive
- Miroslav Havel (1922–2008), Czech designer
- Olga Havlová (1933–1996), Czech dissident and activist, First Lady of the Czech Republic
- Radek Havel (ice hockey) (born 1994), Czech ice hockey player
- Radek Havel (swimmer) (born 1961), Czech swimmer
- Václav Havel (1936–2011), Czech writer and politician, president of Czechoslovakia and the Czech Republic
- Václav Havel (canoeist) (1920–1979), Czech canoeist

== Given name ==
- Havel of Markvartice (flourished 1230–1280), Czech nobleman
- Havel Medek of Valdek (died 1410), Czech nobleman
- Havel Rowe (1928–2019), Australian rules footballer

== See also ==
- Havel (disambiguation)
- Václav Havel Airport Prague
- Havell, an English surname
