= Bill Wilson (footballer) =

Australian rules footballer

Personal information
- Full name: William Wilson
- Born: 18 October 1924
- Died: 11 July 1969 (aged 44); Manila, Philippines
- Original team: Richmond Recruits
- Height: 173 cm (5 ft 8 in)
- Weight: 75 kg (165 lb)

Playing career^{1}
Years	Club	Games (Goals)
1944–1954	Richmond	185 (225)
1955–1957	Glenelg	39 (45)
Total		224 (270)
- ^{1} Playing statistics correct to the end of 1954.

Career highlights
- Richmond Best and Fairest 1947; Interstate Games:- 10

William Wilson (18 October 1924 – 11 July 1969) was an Australian rules footballer who played in the VFL in between 1944 and 1954 for the Richmond Football Club.

After leaving Richmond he had three seasons with Glenelg in the SANFL, coming equal third for the Magarey Medal in 1955.

He then returned to Richmond and coached the Under 19 side from 1958 to 1960, leading them to the premiership in his first year. He was a Richmond committeeman between 1966 and 1968, when he retired. He died in Manila in July 1969.
