= Dave Cuzens =

Australian rules footballer (1932–2021)

Personal information
- Full name: David Yule Cuzens
- Born: 11 December 1932
- Died: 22 October 2021 (aged 88)
- Original team: Kalgoorlie City/Glenhuntly
- Height: 182 cm (6 ft 0 in)
- Weight: 84 kg (185 lb)

Playing career^{1}
| Years | Club | Games (Goals) |
| 1957–1961 | Richmond | 69 (3) |
- ^{1} Playing statistics correct to the end of 1961.

Career highlights
- Richmond Best and Fairest 1958, 1959; Interstate Games:- 4

David Yule Cuzens (11 December 1932 – 22 October 2021) was an Australian rules football player who played in the VFL between 1957 and 1961 for the Richmond Football Club.

After leaving Richmond he returned to his home town of Perth where he played for and was senior coach of Subiaco in 1962 and 1963. In 1964 he played for one last season in the WAFL, this time for East Perth.
