= Brett Deledio =

Australian rules footballer (born 1987)

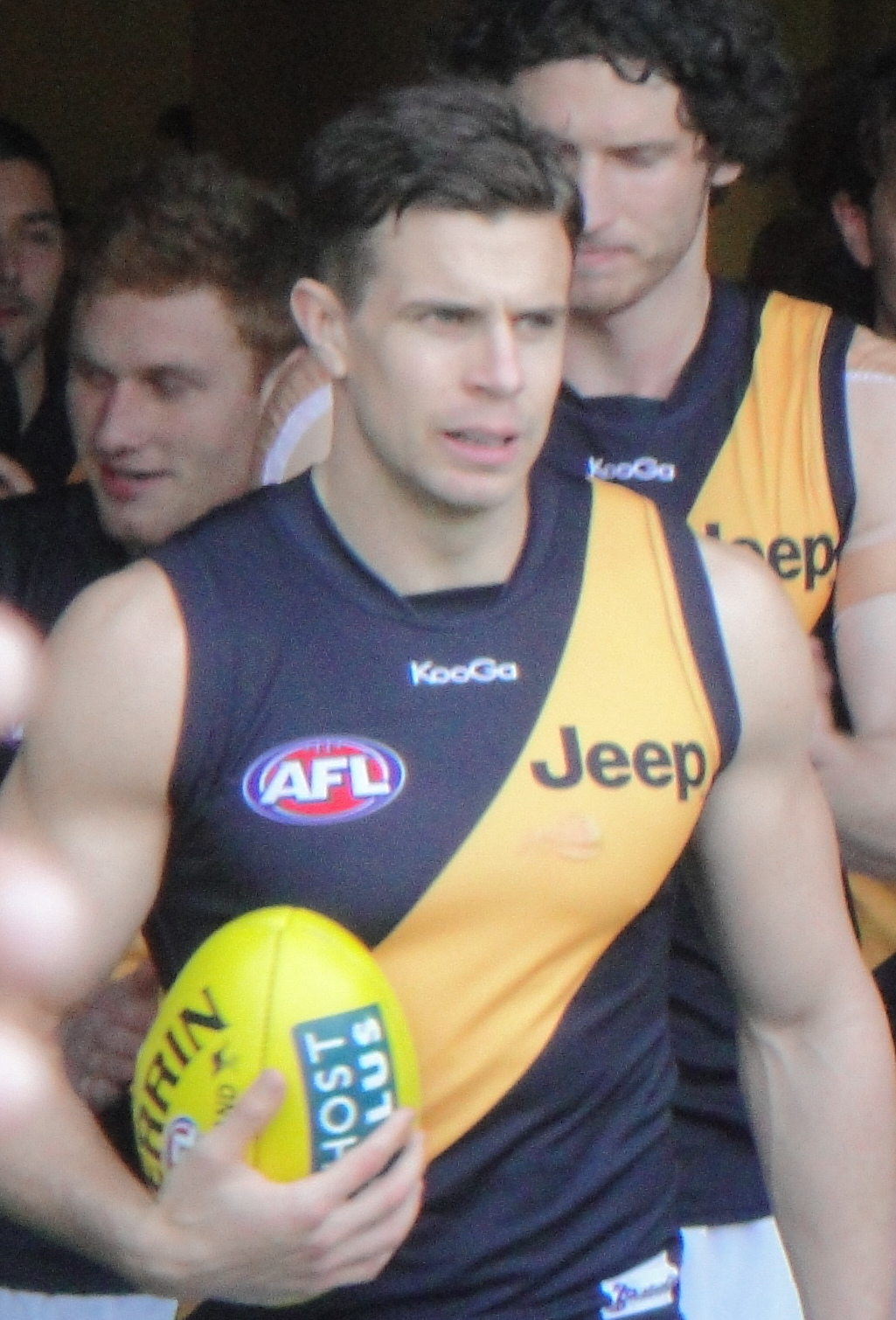
- Deledio with Richmond in August 2013

Personal information
- Full name: Brett Edward Deledio
- Nickname: Lids
- Born: 18 April 1987 (age 39); Kyabram, Victoria
- Original teams: Kyabram (GVFL); Murray Bushrangers (TAC Cup)
- Draft: No. 1, 2004 national draft
- Height: 189 cm (6 ft 2 in)
- Weight: 88 kg (194 lb)
- Position: Midfielder

Playing career^{1}
Years	Club	Games (Goals)
2005–2016	Richmond	243 (182)
2017–2019	Greater Western Sydney	32 (15)
Total		275 (197)

International team honours^{2}
Years	Team	Games (Goals)
2005	Australia	2 (0)
- ^{1} Playing statistics correct to the end of 2019.^{2} Representative statistics correct as of 2005.

Career highlights
- AFL: 2× All-Australian: 2012, 2015; AFL Rising Star: 2005; AFLPA Best First-Year Player: 2005; AFL Army Award: 2008; 2× Ian Stewart Medal: 2011, 2015; Yiooken Award: 2012; Richmond: 2× Jack Dyer Medal: 2008, 2009; 2× Jack Titus Medal (2nd RFC B&F): 2011, 2012; 2× Maurie Fleming Medal (3rd RFC B&F): 2010, 2015; Fred Swift Medal (4th RFC B&F): 2013; Kevin Bartlett Medal (5th RFC B&F): 2007; Richmond Best First Year Player: 2005; Richmond Life Member; Richmond Vice-Captain 2013–2016

Brett Edward Deledio (born 18 April 1987) is a former professional Australian rules footballer who played 243 games over 12 seasons with the Richmond Football Club in the Australian Football League (AFL), and a further 32 matches over three seasons with the Greater Western Sydney Giants. He was a two-time All-Australian, two-time Richmond best and fairest winner and recipient of the league's Rising Star award in his debut year in 2005. Between 2013 and 2016, he served as Richmond's vice-captain. Deledio was drafted to Richmond with the number one overall pick in the 2004 AFL draft and made his debut in round 1 of the 2005 season.

== Early life and junior career ==
Deledio was born in Kyabram, Victoria, in 1987 to Judy and Wayne Deledio. His father played a single game for Carlton in 1975, then spent a season with Brunswick in the Victorian Football Association before heading back to the country.

Deledio began playing competitive football at age 8. Playing well above his age bracket, Deledio starred alongside future Richmond teammate Troy Chaplin, who was one year his senior, in the local under-13 competition. At age 15, Deledio played his first game of senior football for the Kyabram Bombers in the Goulburn Valley Football League. He won best-afield honours for his performance in the match.

In 2003 Deledio was a joint winner of the Kevin Sheehan Medal as the best player in the under-16 national championships.

Deledio played for the Murray Bushrangers in the TAC Cup in 2003 and 2004, the leading junior competition in the country. In 2004, his final season, he kicked 21 goals from just 11 games and averaged 23.9 disposals as well. He was also named as a half-forward in the 2004 TAC Cup team of the year.

He went on to represent the Victorian Country side at the under-18 national championships, winning All-Australian honours in the process.

Deledio attended Kyabram High School prior to his AFL draft selection and subsequent move to Melbourne. He enrolled at Caulfield Grammar School to complete his year 12 studies in 2005, but pulled out after just two days.

Instead, he would complete his studies at Richmond, in private tutoring sessions alongside fellow underage club recruits Richard Tambling and Luke McGuane.

In addition to his footballing prowess, Deledio was also a promising young cricket player. A fast-bowler, he represented Victoria at the 2003–04 under-17 national championships. He was also highly capable with the bat, scoring an 85 in the competition's final and leading the Victorians to a national championship. Following this performance, the then coach of the Victorian Bushrangers David Hookes invited Deledio to join the state men's team. Deledio would however decline the offer, instead leaving cricket behind to focus on the prospect of a future career in the AFL.

== AFL career ==
=== Richmond ===
==== Debut year (2005) ====
Deledio was selected by the Richmond Football Club with the first overall pick in the 2004 National Draft.

He made his debut at age 17 years and 343 days in Round 1 the following year, in a Richmond loss to Geelong. He recorded 9 disposals and 6 marks for the match.

He kicked his first career goal in a Round 4 game at the MCG against Fremantle. Deledio was nominated for the Rising Star award following his Round 8 match against Collingwood in which he recorded 13 disposals.

He played all 22 games in his debut season and on 31 August 2005, he was rewarded with the AFL Rising Star award, receiving 43 of a possible 45 votes. Deledio followed this by also winning the Richmond Best First-Year player award and AFL Players' Association Best First-Year Player Award as voted by his peers.

He also represented the club at the 2005 AFL Grand Final Sprint and won.

Capping off his debut season, Deledio was chosen to represent Australia in the International Rules series for 2005, becoming the youngest Australian player in the competition's history.

==== An emerging talent (2006–2007) ====
Deledio played 21 out of 22 matches in 2006 and was again a consistent performer, only missing the one game with an injured knee. He was often the target of attention from opposition taggers due to his abilities, and found it difficult to break the tag. However he still produced impressive figures, averaging 18.8 possessions and 6.5 marks a game.

In 2007 Deledio developed into a highly versatile player, who often provided difficult match-ups for the opposition. He played multiple roles across the season, including stints in the midfield and on both the forward and back flanks. In the forward line he used his speed and judgement well to lead into space and take strong marks, kicking 21 goals for the season and placing third on the club's goal-kicking tally. Out of defence, he often used his electric pace to provide run and carry and deliver pinpoint passes into the forward line. Deledio's best game of the 2007 season came in Tigers' Round 19 win against Collingwood, where he kicked a career-high five goals and earned three Brownlow Medal votes. Deledio averaged 18.4 possessions and 5.4 marks a game for the season and placed fifth in the club's best-and-fairest, earning the Kevin Bartlett Medal.

==== Jack Dyer Medalist (2008–2009) ====
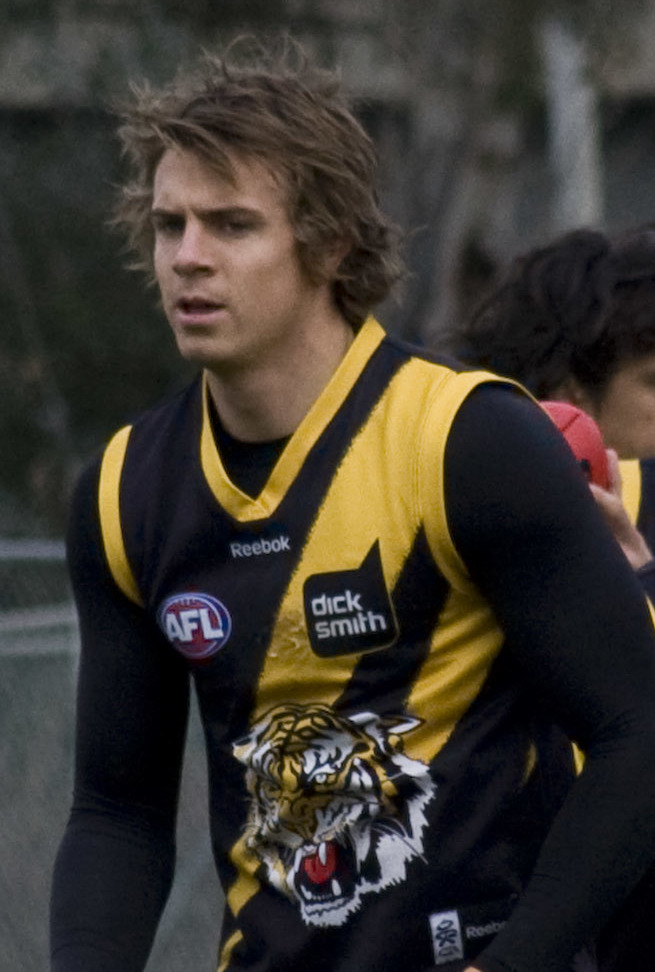
Deledio in August 2009

Deledio began the 2008 season in the forward line for the Tigers, but pushed up the ground later in the season. He surpassed 30 possessions for the first time in Round 6 against Hawthorn before doing so again in Round 10 against Sydney and in round 11 against Adelaide. He won the AFL Army Award for his courage shown in round 7 against the Saints when he flew backwards into a pack to take a mark and heavily collided with a Saints player. He topped the club for inside 50s that year, and averaged a club second 24.6 disposals per game. Deledio was rewarded for his consistent season with his first Jack Dyer Medal as the club's best-and-fairest player, polling 250 votes to take out the award. He was also announced in the 40-man All-Australian squad for 2008 though did not make the final team.

Deledio had another great year in 2009. His best game for the year came against Adelaide in Round 14, where he racked up 31 disposals and kicked one goal. He was the club leader for disposals and inside 50s that year, as well as placing second in tackles and third in clearances. He was rewarded with a second consecutive Jack Dyer Medal. Deledio finished with a total of 190 votes just ahead of Daniel Jackson (175) and skipper Chris Newman (162), thus becoming the youngest player to win the award back-to-back (at the age of 22 years and 5 months) since Kevin Bartlett in 1967–1968, and the youngest player in the AFL to win a best-and-fairest award back-to-back since Michael Voss at Brisbane in 1995–96. He signed a new 3-year contract in 2009, keeping him at Richmond until the end of the 2012 season.

==== A star of the club (2010–2012) ====
2010 saw Deledio have another solid year as he became a solid defence playmaker for Richmond alongside his captain, Chris Newman, averaging 25.3 disposals. Richmond began the 2010 season horribly, losing 10 of their first 11 games, their only win being in round 10 against Port Adelaide. The Tigers soon turned their season around, however, going on to win five of their next seven games, with Deledio playing a vital role in these wins.

Deledio was included in the 40 man All-Australian Squad for the second time in his career. He missed out on selection in the side to Collingwood's Harry O'Brien.

Deledio had his most consistent year to date in 2011, playing all 22 games and averaging 26.3 disposals, becoming acknowledged as an elite half back. Deledio was once again picked in the 40-man All-Australian squad.

Despite his fantastic year, Deledio missed out on an All-Australian side selection.

On 21 December 2011, at the club's Annual General Meeting, Deledio became the youngest life member in Richmond's history. Deledio qualified for the honour when he reached the 150-game milestone in Round 24, 2011 (at 24 years and 139 days old).

With his contract set to expire at the end of the 2012 season, Deledio was among the first to be able to explore free agency, with the midfielder being named by Richmond a restricted free agent prior to the 2012 season; however in March 2012, he signed a new five-year deal believed to be worth more than $3 million, keeping him contracted to the Tigers until the end of the 2017 season.

The 2012 season saw Deledio become one of the AFL's most valuable players, averaging 28 possessions per game. In the Dreamtime at the 'G clash against Essendon in Round 8, Deledio starred for the Tigers in the loss, racking up 35 possessions to win the Yiooken Award as the best player on the ground.

Apart from early in 2009, Deledio had consistently played good football, despite some critics citing that he has not lived up to expectations. However, after the Round 8 "Dreamtime at the G" Clash between Essendon and Richmond, Former Tigers head coach Damien Hardwick stated that he felt that Brett had finally become a “true AFL elite player” and was quoted as saying that: "His contested ball work has come on in leaps and bounds," [and] "That was probably the one area of his game that I thought needed work but he's just been enormous in that area this year. He's become an elite player of the competition."

==== Leadership and a first final (2013) ====
Deledio played all 23 games in 2013, averaging 23.8 possessions per game. He finished fourth in the club's best and fairest, winning the 'Fred Swift Medal'.

In Round 3 against the Western Bulldogs, Deledio kicked a goal within 8.9 seconds of the match starting, making it the fastest goal in AFL history, beating the former record of 9.1 seconds held by Gary Ablett, Jr. After 194 matches, Deledio finally played his first AFL final in Richmond's elimination final loss to Carlton at the Melbourne Cricket Ground. His 194-match wait until a maiden final is the longest of any current player in the AFL.

==== Injuries and a move to half forward (2014–2016) ====
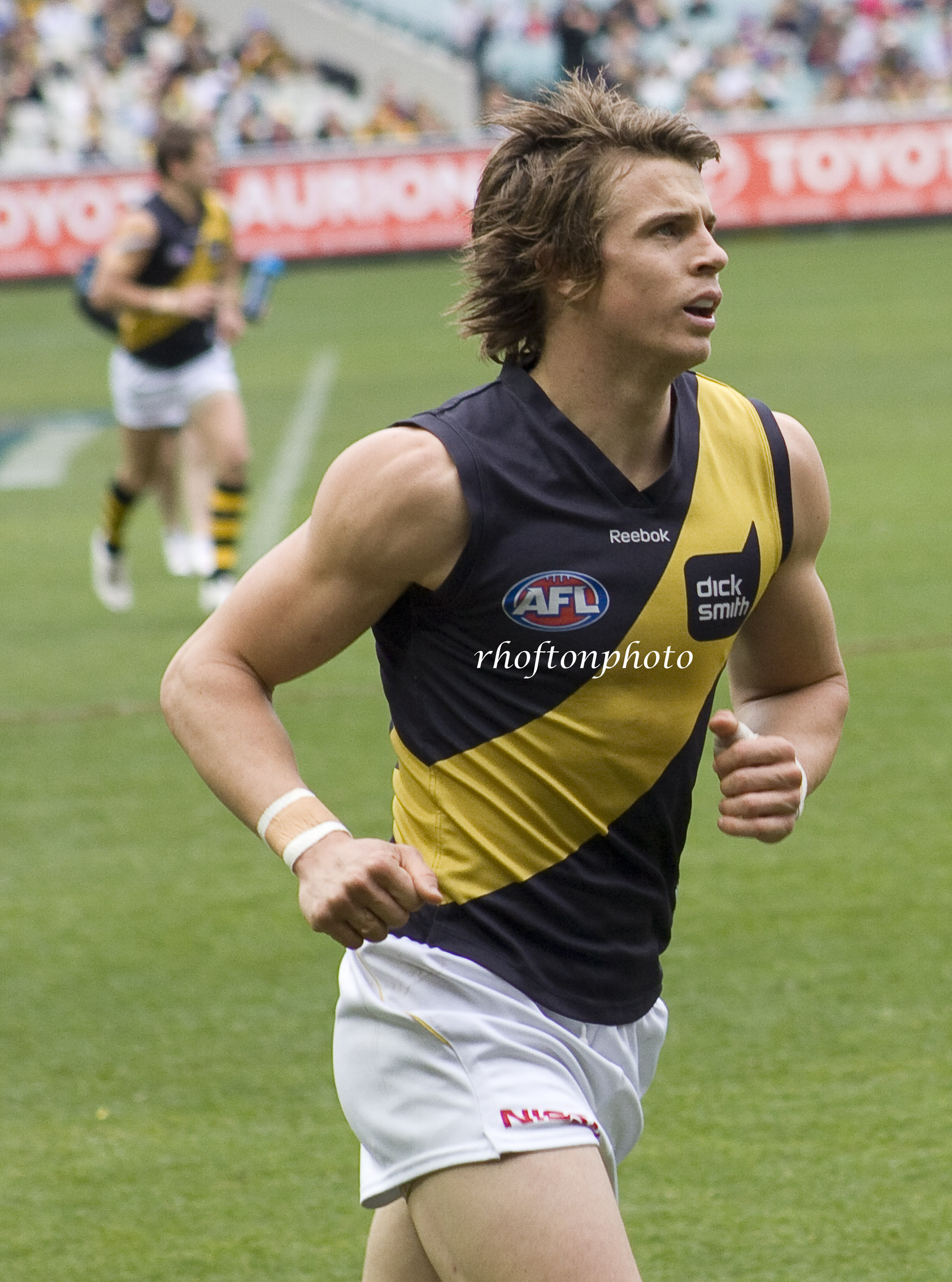
Deledio in August 2009

Deledio had a slow start to the year due to an ongoing lower leg injury he was trying to nurse while playing, but as his fitness improved, so did he and so did Richmond as a whole. He played across the half-forward line in the latter half of the year and from round 15 and onwards he averaged 27 disposals per game, 1.4 goals per game, 6.2 marks per game, 5.5 inside 50s per game and least importantly he averaged 1.2 brownlow votes per game. His new position meant he had easier access to goals, kicked 11 goals in the last 5 Home & Away games of the year, and was a key figure in the Tigers rise from the lower rungs of the ladder to narrowly making the finals after nine consecutive wins to close out the season. He was a part of the team that lost to Port Adelaide by 57 points despite a very good individual performance of 29 disposals and 1 goal in the Elimination Final, just the second finals match of his career. He finished seventh in Richmond's best and fairest count.

In January 2015, Deledio was appointed joint vice-captain for the 2015 season, along with Ivan Maric. For the second year running Deledio went into the season carrying an injury. After struggling through the team's Round 1 clash victory over Carlton he faced four weeks recovery on the sidelines. He would return to the side for the team's Round 6 match against North Melbourne.

Deledio's second match back from injury against Collingwood earned him much praise as he helped Richmond get across the line to defeat Collingwood by 5 points, the first time they had defeated Collingwood since 2007. Deledio continued his varied role of midfield/forward, racking up 30 disposals, 13 marks and 2 goals/2 behinds, being arguably the best on ground. A talking point rose as Deledio now had 2 goals and 4 behinds for the season, fairly rare for Deledio who was known for his accurate kicking. The result of this was possibly due to a new kicking style he had been practicing in the off-season.

Deledio continued the season in fantastic form, stamping himself in as 'Richmond's most important player' as stated by many commentators, some of them being Bruce McAvaney and ex-player commentators Matthew Richardson and Matthew Lloyd. At the time of the Adelaide crows loss where Deledio was absent through illness, many experts also noted that statistics proved that Richmond had a significant winning advantage when Deledio was in the side. Stats read that Richmond played 9 games without Deledio over the 14 and 15 seasons, only managing to win 2. On the other hand, the 32 matches with Deledio had resulted in 21 wins.

Deledio's most notable performance was against in form top 4 side Hawthorn. Deledio booted 3 goals in the first quarter and then sealed the win with a goal at the start of the final quarter. It was the first time he had kicked more than 3 goals since the 2008 season, yet had many 3 goal games since then.

During the H&A season Deledio averaged 21.9 disposals, 6.2 marks, 1.5 goals, 0.9 behinds, 2.9 tackles, finishing off arguably his best season in his career despite an injury riddled start to the year.

Between Rd 7 and Rd 23, Deledio averaged 8.7 score involvements per game, ranked second in the league only to the 2015 Coleman Medal winner Joshua Kennedy.

Deledio was selected in the 2015 All-Australian team and the 2015 AFLCA All-Australian team.

Deledio was nursed through the 2016 pre-season, only making a half-game appearance against Port Adelaide in the NAB CUP. In this match he kicked a 9-point Super goal, meaning $500 worth of Sherrin footballs were donated to his junior club.

Deledio suffered a quad injury that put him out until Round 6 vs. Port Adelaide. In his return match he showed similar form to previous seasons, racking up 22 disposals, laying 6 tackles and kicking a goal.

Deledio continued to play good football, making the most of his versatility and playing numerous roles throughout the season. During the Rd 17 match vs. the Essendon Bombers his potential best on ground performance was cut short at half time due to a sharp pain in his calf muscle – a problem that had hindered his fitness for the third season straight. He sat out the remainder of the 2016 season as a precaution, deciding to rest and concentrate on remaining healthy for the 2017 season.

Deledio finished 2016 as the club's then all-time career tackles record holder, with 688 recorded across his 243 games. He also ranked 11th for games played for the club at this time.

=== Greater Western Sydney ===
At the conclusion of the 2016 season, he was traded to Greater Western Sydney. He struggled to overcome a calf injury early in the season, failing to play a match at any level through the first 19 matches until finally making his debut for the Giants in round 20 where he kicked a goal.

In 2019, Deledio began serving as a development coach with the Giants' AFL Women's team.

== Player profile ==
Deledio is a versetile player who has played in several positions during his career.

As a junior, he played predominantly in the forward line, but he was shifted to the midfield in his latter days of junior football.

Early on at Richmond he alternated between playing as a midfielder and as a half-forward. In 2008 and 2009 he won Jack Dyer Medals in a predominantly midfield role. Upon Damien Hardwick's arrival in the 2010 season, Deledio had a move to the half-back line. In 2012 though, Deledio was moved again into the midfield where he earned All-Australian selection for the first time. Since 2014 Deledio has been contained to a mostly half-forward role. He won All-Australian selection on half-forward after a 1.5 goal per game season in 2015.

He was rated as Richmond's best kick by his peers and by numerous media pundits.

== Statistics ==
Legend
G	Goals	K	Kicks	D	Disposals	T	Tackles
B	Behinds	H	Handballs	M	Marks

Season	Team	No.	Games	Totals							Averages (per game)						
Season	Team	No.	Games	G	B	K	H	D	M	T	G	B	K	H	D	M	T
2005	Richmond	3	22	14	10	186	159	336	86	37	0.6	0.4	8.4	6.8	15.3	3.9	1.7
2006	Richmond	3	21	5	12	241	154	395	137	35	0.2	0.6	11.5	7.2	18.8	6.5	1.7
2007	Richmond	3	19	21	10	188	161	349	102	36	1.1	0.5	9.9	8.5	18.4	5.4	1.9
2008	Richmond	3	22	28	10	255	283	538	155	48	1.3	0.4	11.6	12.7	24.4	7.0	2.2
2009	Richmond	3	22	20	15	254	279	533	118	78	0.9	0.7	11.6	12.9	24.2	5.4	3.6
2010	Richmond	3	22	2	4	302	254	556	116	54	0.1	0.2	13.7	11.6	25.3	5.3	2.4
2011	Richmond	3	22	9	11	281	282	563	91	65	0.4	0.5	12.8	12.8	25.6	4.1	3.0
2012	Richmond	3	22	17	15	339	266	605	110	102	0.8	0.7	15.4	12.1	27.5	5.0	4.6
2013	Richmond	3	23	10	15	317	230	547	118	86	0.4	0.6	13.8	10.0	23.8	5.1	3.7
2014	Richmond	3	19	20	16	258	225	483	102	52	1.0	0.8	13.6	11.8	25.4	5.4	2.7
2015	Richmond	3	17	26	15	213	159	372	105	50	1.5	0.9	12.5	9.4	21.9	6.2	2.9
2016	Richmond	3	11	9	7	124	130	254	58	39	0.8	0.6	11.3	11.8	23.1	5.3	3.5
2017	Greater Western Sydney	7	7	5	2	49	49	98	29	24	0.7	0.3	7.0	7.0	14.0	4.1	3.4
2018	Greater Western Sydney	7	11	4	1	109	113	222	59	31	0.4	0.1	9.9	10.3	20.2	5.4	2.8
2019	Greater Western Sydney	7	14	6	6	129	115	244	71	36	0.4	0.4	9.2	8.2	17.4	5.1	2.6
Career			275	197	149	3255	2857	6112	1459	779	0.7	0.5	11.8	10.4	22.2	5.3	2.8

== Personal life ==
In 2013, Deledio married Katie Chivers.

=== Off-field work ===
Deledio competed in Rexona Australia's Greatest Athlete television show and finished 3rd with 1070 points, behind Jamie Whincup on 1085 points and Billy Slater on 1385.

In 2013, during Adidas' promotion for the 'Nitrocharge' boot, Deledio was painted to have his body appear to look like a machine or an engine.

== See also ==
- List of Caulfield Grammar School people
