= Haval =

Haval may refer to

- Haval (marque), a Chinese automobile marque owned by Great Wall Motor
- Haval (rapper) (born 1995), Swedish rapper
- HAVAL, a cryptographic hash function

== See also ==
- Havel (disambiguation)
