= Dave Baxter =

Australian rules footballer, born 1910

Personal information
- Full name: David James Baxter
- Born: 15 December 1910; Clare, South Australia
- Died: 2 December 1978 (aged 67); Edenhope, Victoria
- Original team: Serviceton
- Height: 187 cm (6 ft 2 in)
- Weight: 80.5 kg (177 lb)

Playing career^{1}
Years	Club	Games (Goals)
1934–1936	Richmond	47 (53)
- ^{1} Playing statistics correct to the end of 1936.

Career highlights
- Richmond premiership player 1934

David James Baxter (15 December 1910 – 2 December 1978) was an Australian rules footballer who played in the Victorian Football League (VFL) between 1934 and 1936 for the Richmond Football Club.

Baxter's son, David Junior, was a member of the Tigers' under-19s 1973 premiership side and his brother-in-law, Leo Merrett, was a member of Richmond's 1943 senior premiership team.

Baxter later served in the Volunteer Defence Corps as part of the Australian Army during World War II.
