= Jack Dyer Medal =

Australian football award

The Jack Dyer Medal is an Australian rules football award given each season to the player or players adjudged best and fairest for the Richmond Football Club.

The award is now named in honour of Jack Dyer, a champion ruckman who won the award five times from 1937 to 1946. He was one of the inaugural "Legends" inducted into the Australian Football Hall of Fame in 1996.

Other multiple winners have been Kevin Bartlett (five times); Wayne Campbell and dual Brownlow Medallist Roy Wright (four times each); Ron Branton, Neville Crowe, Geoff Raines, Brownlow Medallist Bill Morris, Trent Cotchin, and most recently Tim Taranto (three times each). Basil McCormack, Jack Titus, Leo Merrett, Des Rowe, Dave Cuzens, Royce Hart, Maurice Rioli, Dale Weightman, Matthew Knights, Tony Free, Joel Bowden, Brett Deledio, Dustin Martin, and most recently Jack Riewoldt have all won the award twice.

Bill Morris, Roy Wright, Ian Stewart, Trent Cotchin and Dustin Martin all won the best and fairest in the same years that they won their Brownlow Medals at Richmond, while Stan Judkins, Brownlow Medallist in 1930, never won the club's award.

The voting system as of the 2023 AFL season, consists of all the team’s players on match day receiving a rating from 0-5 based on their overall performance. The match committee assesses each player’s offensive, defensive and contest impacts on the game. After those game phases have been analysed, the 0-5 rating is given as a joint match committee decision. Votes are not allocated for what the match committee deems a below-average performance.

== Recipients ==
^	Denotes current player
+	Player won Brownlow Medal in same season

Season	Recipient(s)	Ref.
1908 to 1926	—N/a	
1927	Basil McCormack	
1928	Basil McCormack (2)	
1929	Jack Titus	
1930 to 1934	—N/a	
1935	Ray Martin	
1936	—N/a	
1937	Jack Dyer (1)	
1938	Jack Dyer (2)	
1939	Jack Dyer (3)	
1940	Jack Dyer (4)	
1941	Jack Titus (2)	
1942	Leo Merrett	
1943	Ron Durham	
1944	Leo Merrett (2)	
1945	Bill Morris	
1946	Jack Dyer (5)	
1947	Bill Wilson	
1948	Bill Morris+ (2)	
1949	Geoff Spring	
1950	Bill Morris (3)	
1951	Des Rowe	
1951	Roy Wright	
1952	Roy Wright+ (2)	
1953	Havel Rowe	
1954	Roy Wright+ (3)	
1955	Des Rowe (2)	
1956	Laurie Sharp	
1957	Roy Wright (4)	
1958	Dave Cuzens	
1959	Dave Cuzens (2)	
1960	Ron Branton	
1961	Ron Branton (2)	
1962	Ron Branton (3)	
1963	Neville Crowe	
1964	Neville Crowe (2)	
1965	Bill Barrot	
1966	Neville Crowe (3)	
1967	Kevin Bartlett	
1968	Kevin Bartlett (2)	
1969	Royce Hart	
1970	Francis Bourke	
1971	Ian Stewart+	
1972	Royce Hart (2)	
1973	Kevin Bartlett (3)	
1974	Kevin Bartlett (4)	
1975	Kevin Morris	
1976	Kevin Sheedy	
1977	Kevin Bartlett (5)	
1978	Geoff Raines	
1979	Barry Rowlings	
1980	Geoff Raines (2)	
1981	Geoff Raines (3)	
1982	Maurice Rioli	
1983	Maurice Rioli (2)	
1984	Mark Lee	
1985	Trevor Poole	
1986	Dale Weightman	
1987	Dale Weightman (2)	
1988	Michael Pickering	
1989	Tony Free	
1990	Matthew Knights	
1991	Craig Lambert	
1992	Matthew Knights (2)	
1993	Tony Free (2)	
1994	Chris Bond	
1995	Wayne Campbell	
1996	Paul Broderick	
1997	Wayne Campbell (2)	
1998	Nick Daffy	
1999	Wayne Campbell (3)	
2000	Andrew Kellaway	
2001	Darren Gaspar	
2002	Wayne Campbell (4)	
2003	Mark Coughlan	
2004	Joel Bowden	
2005	Joel Bowden (2)	
2006	Kane Johnson	
2007	Matthew Richardson	
2008	Brett Deledio	
2009	Brett Deledio (2)	
2010	Jack Riewoldt	
2011	Trent Cotchin	
2012	Trent Cotchin+ (2)	
2013	Daniel Jackson	
2014	Trent Cotchin (3)	
2015	Alex Rance	
2016	Dustin Martin	
2017	Dustin Martin+ (2)	
2018	Jack Riewoldt (2)	
2019	Dion Prestia	
2020	Jayden Short^	
2021	Dylan Grimes	
2022	Tom Lynch^	
2023	Tim Taranto^	
2024	Daniel Rioli	
2025	Tim Taranto^ (2)	
2026	Tim Taranto^ (3)	

== Multiple winners ==
^	Denotes current player

Player	Medals	Seasons
Jack Dyer	5	1937, 1938, 1939, 1940, 1946
Kevin Bartlett	5	1967, 1968, 1973, 1974, 1977
Wayne Campbell	4	1995, 1997, 1999, 2002
Roy Wright	4	1951, 1952, 1954, 1957
Ron Branton	3	1960, 1961, 1962
Trent Cotchin	3	2011, 2012, 2014
Neville Crowe	3	1963, 1964, 1966
Bill Morris	3	1945, 1948, 1950
Geoff Raines	3	1978, 1980, 1981
Tim Taranto^	3	2023, 2025, 2026
Joel Bowden	2	2004, 2005
Dave Cuzens	2	1958, 1959
Brett Deledio	2	2008, 2009
Dustin Martin	2	2016, 2017
Tony Free	2	1989, 1993
Royce Hart	2	1969, 1972
Matthew Knights	2	1990, 1992
Basil McCormack	2	1927, 1928
Leo Merrett	2	1942, 1944
Jack Riewoldt	2	2010, 2018
Maurice Rioli	2	1982, 1983
Des Rowe	2	1951, 1955
Jack Titus	2	1929, 1941
Dale Weightman	2	1986, 1987

== Removed winners ==
Following a nineteen-year investigation undertaken by members of the Richmond Historical Committee, it was announced in November 2019 that their research into the history of the award had discovered that 18 of the 22 awards between 1911 and 1936 (none had been listed in 1912, 1915, and 1930–1931) were not actually presented at the time but were instead erroneously added retrospectively in 1988 and 1991.

This caused a degree of controversy, as this resulted in Jack Dyer's record tally of six medals being reduced to five (with his 1932 award being removed), equal with Kevin Bartlett. In addition, Ray Martin also had his back-to-back medals reduced to one (his 1934 award was removed), and a further twelve players—including those from the club's earliest years in the VFL/AFL, members of the club's 1920–1921 premiership teams, and teammates of Dyer—had all of their awards removed from the records.

Season	Recipient
1911	William Mahoney
1913	Charlie Ricketts
1914	Sid Reeves
1916	Artie Bettles
1917	Vic Thorp
1918	Barney Herbert
1919	Barney Herbert
1920	Dan Minogue
1921	Hugh James
1922	Mel Morris
1923	Hugh James
1924	Vic Thorp
1925	Thomas O'Halloran
1926	Allan Geddes
1932	Jack Dyer
1933	Maurie Hunter
1934	Ray Martin
1936	Martin Bolger
