= Leo Merrett =

Australian rules footballer and coach

Personal information
- Full name: Leo Frederick Merrett
- Born: 5 April 1920; Nhill, Victoria
- Died: 18 October 1976 (aged 56); Prahran, Victoria
- Original team: Serviceton / Nhill/Glen Iris CYMS (CYMSFA)
- Height: 178 cm (5 ft 10 in)
- Weight: 73 kg (161 lb)

Playing career^{1}
Years	Club	Games (Goals)
1940–1949	Richmond	170 (53)
- ^{1} Playing statistics correct to the end of 1949.

Career highlights
- Richmond Premiership Player 1943; Richmond Best and Fairest 1942, 1944; Interstate Games: 4

Leo Frederick Merrett (5 April 1920 – 18 October 1976) was an Australian rules footballer who played in the VFL in between 1940 and 1949 for the Richmond Football Club.

== Family ==
The son of Frederick Merrett, and Ellen Clarice Merrett, née Buckley, Leo Frederick Merrett was born at Nhill, Victoria, on 5 April 1920.

He married Sheila Nora Etheridge on 22 April 1944.

His brother-in-law was the Richmond footballer Dave Baxter.

He is the great-grandfather of Western Bulldogs player Bailey Smith.

== Football ==
Merrett was a member of Richmond's 1943 VFL Grand Final victory against Essendon.

In November 1946, Merrett was appointed as the captain / coach of the Border United Football Club.

In January, 1947, it was announced that Richmond Football Club refused Merrett a clearance to coach the Border United Football Club.
