= Laurie Sharp =

Australian rules footballer

Personal information
- Full name: Lawrence William Sharp
- Born: 25 August 1935; Carlton, Victoria
- Died: 7 November 1974 (aged 39); Melbourne, Victoria
- Original team: Edithvale-Aspendale
- Height: 178 cm (5 ft 10 in)
- Weight: 82.5 kg (182 lb)

Playing career^{1}
Years	Club	Games (Goals)
1954–1957	Richmond	41 (14)
1959	South Melbourne	11 (5)
Total		52 (19)
- ^{1} Playing statistics correct to the end of 1959.

Career highlights
- Richmond Best and Fairest 1956

Lawrence William Sharp (25 August 1935 – 7 November 1974) was an Australian rules footballer who played in the VFL between 1954 and 1957 for the Richmond Football Club and then in 1959 for the South Melbourne Football Club.
