= Havel (disambiguation) =

The Havel is a river in Germany.

Havel may also refer to:

- Havel (name), a Czech surname and given name
- Havel Canal, a canal in Germany
- Havel (film), a 2020 Czech film about Václav Havel

== See also ==
- Haval (disambiguation)
- Elbe–Havel Canal
- Oder–Havel Canal
- Havell
