= Trent Cotchin =

Australian rules footballer

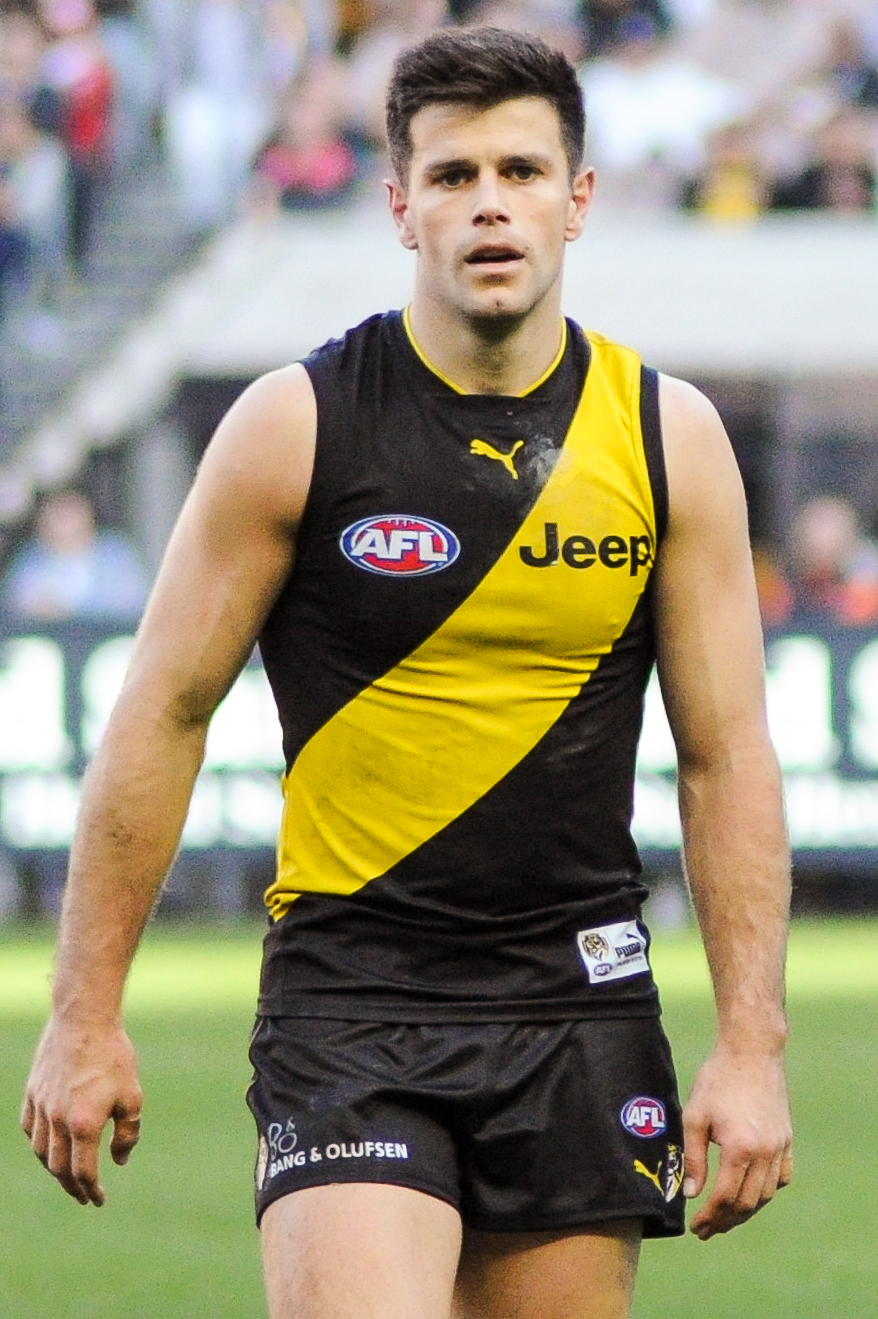
- Cotchin with Richmond in June 2017

Personal information
- Full name: Trent William Cotchin
- Born: 7 April 1990 (age 36); Melbourne, Victoria
- Original teams: Northern Knights (TAC Cup); West Preston Lakeside (NFL)
- Draft: No. 2, 2007 national draft
- Debut: Round 8, 2008, Richmond vs. Geelong, at MCG
- Height: 185 cm (6 ft 1 in)
- Weight: 86 kg (190 lb)
- Position: Midfielder

Playing career^{1}
Years	Club	Games (Goals)
2008–2023	Richmond	306 (141)

Representative team honours
Years	Team	Games (Goals)
2020	Victoria	1 (0)
- ^{1} Playing statistics correct to the end of the 2023 season.

Career highlights
- 3× AFL premiership captain: 2017, 2019, 2020; Richmond captain: 2013–2021; Brownlow Medal: 2012; 3× Jack Dyer Medal: 2011, 2012, 2014; AFLCA Champion Player of the Year: 2012; All-Australian team: 2012; State of Origin – Victoria captain: 2020; AFLPA best captain: 2018; 22under22 team: 2012; AFL Rising Star nominee: 2008; Yiooken Award: 2011; Ian Stewart Medal: 2014

Trent William Cotchin (born 7 April 1990) is a former professional Australian rules footballer who played for the Richmond Football Club in the Australian Football League (AFL). He is an All-Australian, a three-time Richmond best and fairest winner, a Brownlow medallist, and a three-time premiership winning captain. Cotchin represented the Victorian Metro side at the 2007 AFL Under 18 Championships and captained the Vic Metro side at 2006 Under 16 Championships. He played for the Northern Knights in the TAC Cup as a junior, before being drafted to Richmond with the second overall pick in the 2007 national draft. He led the club to a 37-year drought-breaking premiership in 2017 before taking them again to a premiership in 2019 and 2020.

== Early life and junior football ==
Cotchin grew up in the northern Melbourne suburb of Reservoir and spent his later teenage years in the suburb of Wollert, 27 kilometres north of Melbourne. He played his junior football with West Preston Lakeside in the Northern Football League before moving on to play with the Northern Knights in the TAC Cup at the age of 16.

In 2006, Cotchin captained the Victorian Metro side in the under-16 national championships.

In January 2007, Cotchin spent time training with the Richmond Football Club senior list as a member of the AIS/AFL Academy. Cotchin later spoke of being taken under the wing of Richmond player, Brett Deledio. At the time Deledio was his favourite AFL player, with a poster of him hanging on Cotchin's bedroom wall in his family home. At the 2007 AFL Under 18 Championships, Cotchin was a member of the runner-up Victorian Metro side. Cotchin suffered a broken foot while playing with the Northern Knights in the TAC Cup finals in September 2007, which saw him face more than six weeks away from football.

Cotchin attended high school at Parade College and Penleigh and Essendon Grammar School. He was named among the team's best in the latter's 2007 state school championship victory.

=== AFL recruitment ===
Prior to the 2007 AFL draft, Cotchin was notable for his "class, balance, (and) ability to read the play". He was projected to be a high draft pick, with Collingwood recruiter Derek Hine telling the Herald Sun that Cotchin would be his choice for the number one pick had it been in Collingwood's hands. In October that year, Cotchin's father Peter had spoken to the media expressing concern over the possibility that his son may be drafted by West Coast. He cited the club's then-issues with recreational drug use among its playing list.

Cotchin missed most of the AFL's pre-draft camp testing on account of the ankle injury sustained earlier in the year. In the days prior to the draft, Cotchin was heavily linked to Richmond with the second overall selection. The CEO of Carlton, who held the number one pick, confirmed that the club would choose between Cotchin and Northern Knights teammate Matthew Kreuzer with their pick.

== AFL career ==
=== 2008 season ===
Cotchin was drafted by Richmond with the club's first selection and the second overall in the 2007 AFL draft. He was assigned the number nine guernsey, which had remained unused since the retirement of former club captain Wayne Campbell at the end of the 2005 season. Upon joining the club, Cotchin began to rehabilitate his injured foot but suffered the effects of an inflamed Achilles tendon on just his second treadmill run. He missed much of the club's standard pre-season training, forced instead to stick to swimming and exercise bike sessions to maintain fitness. Cotchin returned to full training the week of round 1 but was not declared fit to play for a further four weeks. He subsequently played four matches with Richmond's Victorian Football League (VFL) affiliate side, Coburg. Cotchin made his senior debut in round 8 of the 2008 season in a match against Geelong at the Melbourne Cricket Ground (MCG). He recorded sixteen disposals and an equal team-high two goals, one of which came with his first kick. In round 11, Cotchin recorded 17 possessions in the first half of Richmond's match against Adelaide. He finished the match with 25 disposals and a goal to his name. After further impressive performances, Cotchin received the AFL Rising Star nomination for round 12. He kicked a goal and gathered 14 possessions on his way to the nomination. Cotchin did not miss a game after making his debut, finishing the season having played fifteen games, kicking nine goals and averaging 16.4 disposals per game. He ultimately finished third in the AFL Rising Star Award with 21 votes, behind Hawthorn's Cyril Rioli (37 votes) and Fremantle's Rhys Palmer who topped the poll with 44 votes.

=== 2009 season ===
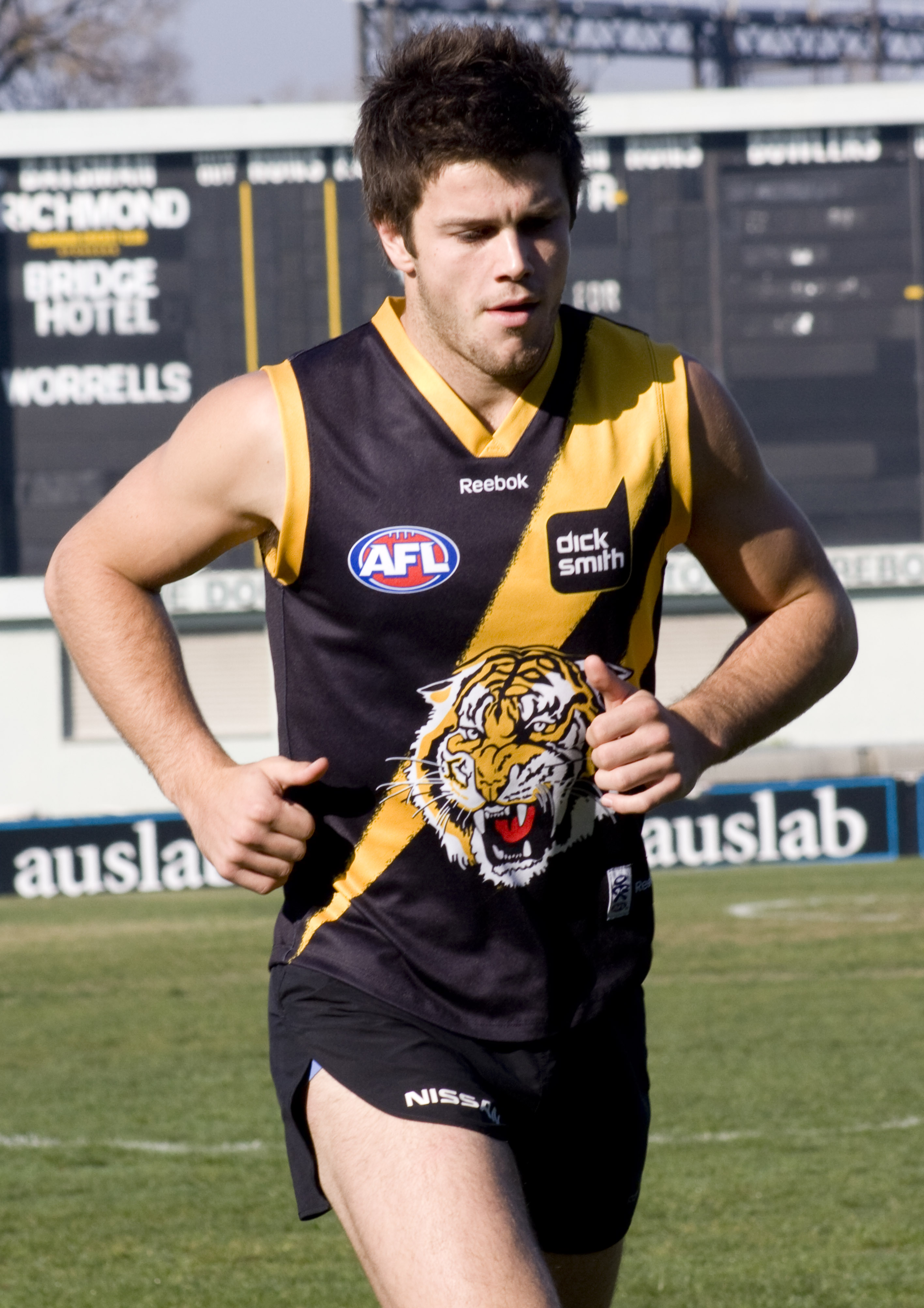
Cotchin in May 2009

Cotchin again struggled with Achilles issues in the pre-season and early stages of his second season. He missed the first seven matches of the season, instead playing limited game-time in VFL games with Coburg. He eventually returned to the club's senior side in Richmond's round 8 match with Port Adelaide. Cotchin's season came to an end after sustaining a hip injury in the round 18 match against Melbourne. He would undergo surgery in August that would keep him from training and playing until late October. He finished the season averaging 17.7 disposals and kicking three goals in ten games.

=== 2010 season ===
In 2010, Cotchin approached the season fully fit for the first time in his career. He spent periods of the pre-season on a limited program however, aiming to build the fitness base that he lacked in his first two seasons. Prior to the season, Cotchin was voted by his teammates into the club's leadership group, a sign of endorsement for his leadership qualities even before reaching his 20th birthday. For the first time in three years Cotchin was a member of Richmond's round 1 side when they played Carlton at the MCG. He went on to play in 15 of the club's first 16 matches, notching more than 20 disposals in seven of those games. When captain Chris Newman missed the club's round 4 match with Melbourne, Cotchin filled in, captaining the club for the first time in his career. In round 16, Cotchin was reported for a late bump on North Melbourne's Sam Wright. Wright was concussed in the incident and the AFL's match review panel judged the hit to be reckless with high contact and of high impact. Cotchin was offered a three-match suspension, which he and the club subsequently challenged. The AFL Tribunal found him guilty, and upgraded him to a four match suspension as a result of the unsuccessful challenge. Cotchin returned to football for Richmond's final two games of the season against St Kilda and Port Adelaide. He recorded twenty-two disposals and kicked two goals in each of the two matches. His season total of 17 matches was his highest to date and was his 19.5 disposals and 4.8 clearances per game. Cotchin finished seventh in the club's best and fairest award that year.

=== 2011 season ===
Building on the fitness he showed the previous year, 2011's pre-season saw Cotchin train with the main group more than ever before. In a profile published in The Age prior to round 1 he cited a previous tendency to fade out late in games due to a low fitness base, but that he believed his first full pre-season would allow him to correct this. It proved to be the case, with Cotchin showing the strong form in the early part of the year. Cotchin had his first career game with 30 disposals in a round 4 loss to Collingwood at the MCG. In round 7, he kicked four goals in a match against Fremantle, his highest tally to date. In round 9, Cotchin received the Yiooken Award as the best on ground in the Dreamtime at the 'G game against Essendon. To that point he had not had a game with less than 20 disposals, averaging 24.4 per game. When captain Chris Newman was ruled out late in the season, Cotchin took over as captain, leading the club in its last five matches of the season. In late-August, Herald Sun journalist Jon Ralph claimed Cotchin was a certainty to be named Richmond's next captain, but that it was unlikely to be so until at the least the end of the 2012 season. Cotchin finished the season having played all 22 matches, a career-first. He topped the club for kicks, inside-50s and clearances during the season. He also received a club-best 15 Brownlow Medal votes at the end of the year award. For his performances during the season Cotchin received his first club best and fairest award, the Jack Dyer Medal.

=== 2012 season ===
Ahead of the 2012 season, Cotchin was officially appointed the club's vice-captain. He spent a week of pre-season away from the main training group, after minor hip surgery underwent at the end of the previous season. He talked in February about a growing confidence in the club's ability to qualify for finals, citing the progress of key draftees in the "developing years" previous.

In round 12, Cotchin recorded 25 disposals in a win against Greater Western Sydney and was awarded six votes in the AFL Coaches Association's player of the year award. The haul moved him into second on the award's leader-board. To that point he had held averages of 26.4 disposals and one goal per game. He was also ranked seventh in the league for total disposals and fourth for inside 50s. He had an equal then-career-best 38 disposals in a match against Gold Coast in round 16. Arguably his best game of the season came in a round 20 victory over the Western Bulldogs. He recorded 35 disposals, seven marks and kicked three goals in a best on ground performance.

By mid-August, Cotchin began to receive significant praise from members of the football media. The Herald Sun's Mark Stevens called Cotchin Richmond's best player since Kevin Bartlett, while The Age's Jake Niall described his attributes as similar to Chris Judd and Gary Ablett Jr. at the same age.

Cotchin is comparable to (Chris) Judd at around the same age and his range of talents – ball-winning, evasion, balance, skills on both sides – are similar to Gary Ablett's. He is en route to becoming the most accomplished player to have represented Richmond since the great Kevin Bartlett.

— Jake Niall, The Age football journalist – 2012

Prior to the season's final match, Chris Newman announced he would be standing aside as captain. At the time Cotchin was earmarked by fans and media as a near-certainty to take up the mantle. The Tigers would ultimately miss out on finals in 2012, with six losses by less than two goals (and one draw) marking a significant opportunity gone missing.

Cotchin received a bevy of awards for his season including a first career selection to the All-Australian team. Cotchin received the most votes in a week-by-week tally to be awarded the AFL Coaches Association's champion player of the year award. In addition Cotchin was anointed The Age's Player of the Year in 2012. He also placed third in the Leigh Matthews Trophy (AFL Players Association most valuable player award). As the club's best player that season, Cotchin was award his second straight Jack Dyer Medal. He led the club in total disposals (606) and placed second in contested possessions (273), inside 50s (116) and clearances (113). He also recorded his best goal-kicking tally to date with 21 across his 22 games.

On the night of the Brownlow Medal count, Cotchin entered as equal favourite alongside Gary Ablett. Though he started the count slowly, Cotchin polled 11 out a possible 12 votes in Richmond's final four matches of the season. He finished the night with a total 25 votes to finish second tied with Hawthorn's Sam Mitchell and behind Essendon's Jobe Watson. Four years later though, in November 2016, the AFL Commission ruled Watson ineligible for the award after his involvement in the Essendon supplements saga. Watson had previously served a 12-month suspension handed down by the World Anti-Doping Agency and four days earlier had voluntarily ceded the medal in anticipation of the AFL's forthcoming decision on its future. Mitchell) was formally presented with the medal in a private ceremony in Melbourne on 13 December 2016.

=== 2013 season ===
On 23 November 2012, the Richmond Football Club announced Cotchin's appointment as club captain for the 2013 season. With this appointment he became the 40th captain in Richmond's VFL/AFL history, and at 22, he became the youngest Richmond captain in more than 100 years. Cotchin broke with recent tradition by choosing to continue wearing his number nine jumper instead of adopting the club's number seventeen guernsey. Former captains Wayne Campbell, Kane Johnson and Chris Newman had all previously adopted the number in honour of club legend Jack Dyer after his death in 2003. Cotchin explained that he held the club's history and Dyer in high regard but he had decided to keep the number nine because he had worn it throughout his football career including his junior years.

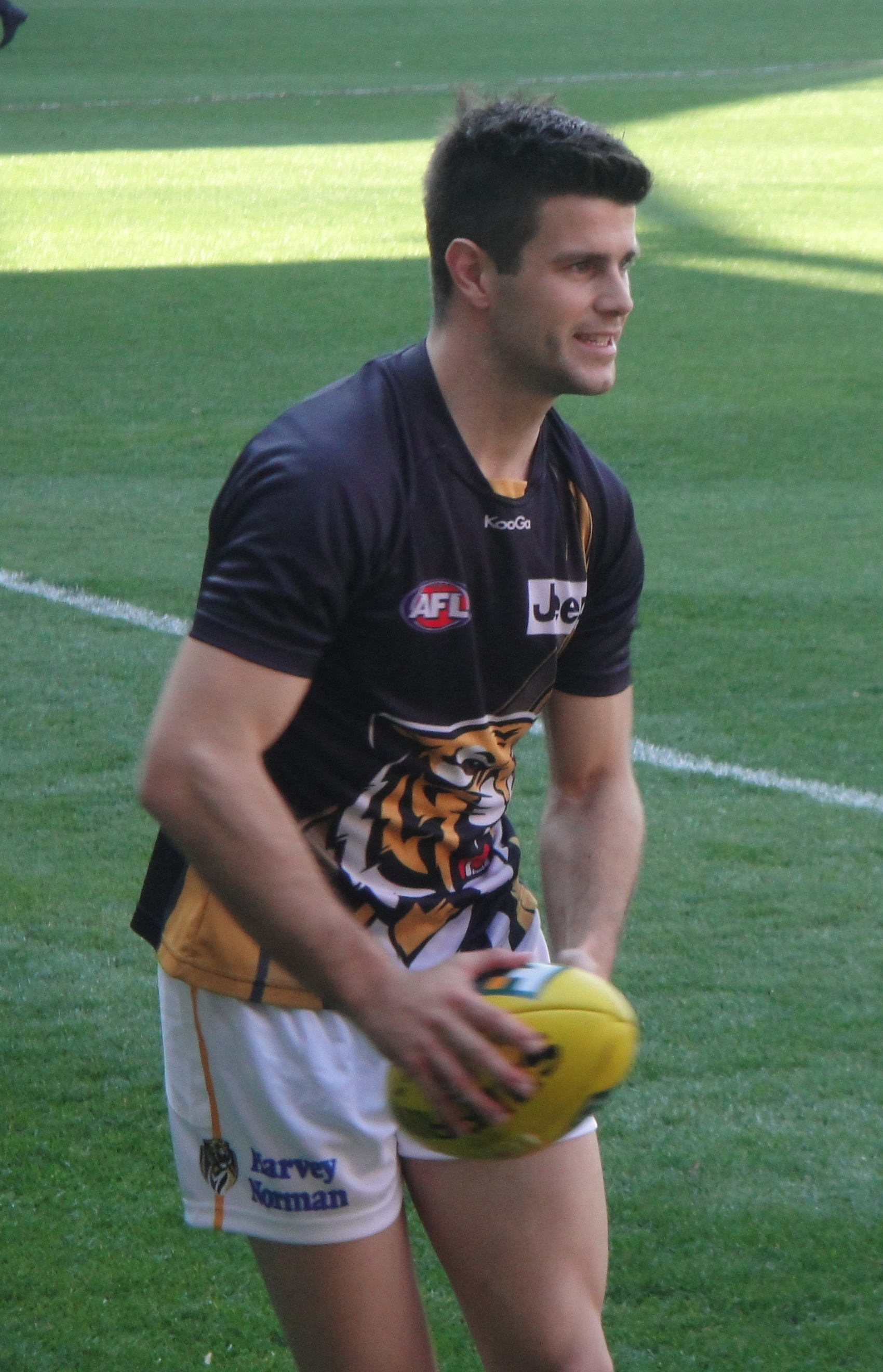
Cotchin warming up before a match in 2013.

Cotchin entered the season with a weight of expectation, picked by the AFL's club captains as the player most likely to win the Brownlow Medal. His performances in the early stages of the season saw him averaging 33.3 disposals and 5.7 clearances per game in his first three appearances. It marked seven consecutive matches with more than 30 disposals (including the previous year's last four matches). Former Brisbane premiership coach turned media commentator Leigh Matthews praised Cotchin's leadership in April 2013. The VFL/AFL legend said he believed Cotchin would "really thrive as captain." In round 5, Cotchin suffered a hyper-extension of the knee. He battled soreness from the minor injury the following week before being ruled out of the club's round 7 match against Port Adelaide. Though he would miss just one game as a result, he later admitted the effects of the injury had lingered and he had suffered bone bruising as a result. Cotchin played his 100th AFL game in round 16 in a match against Gold Coast at Cazaly's Stadium in Cairns. He recorded nine marks and 29 disposals in the match. Across his first hundred games Cotchin racked up 25 or more disposals on 39 occasions.

With a victory in round 19, the Cotchin-led Tigers confirmed a final-series berth for the first time since 2001. The side would eventually finish in fifth place, earning the right to host a home final at the MCG. When the AFL ruled Essendon as disqualified from the finals series due to the ongoing supplements saga, the ninth placed Carlton was elevated to face Richmond in the first elimination final. Cotchin's Richmond side were eventually defeated, giving up a 26-point half-time lead to ultimately go down by 20 points. The captain recorded 26 disposals, five clearances and two goals in the match.

Cotchin led the club for total disposals and clearances that year, finishing fifth in the club's best and fairest count and receiving the Kevin Bartlett Medal for that effort. At the Brownlow Medal, his 19 votes made him the first player in Richmond's history to poll 15 or more votes in three consecutive seasons. He finished equal eighth in the award.

=== 2014 season ===
After a self-described "up and down" season, Cotchin told the media he was focused on maintaining a more consistent personal output in 2014. Cotchin started the season strongly again, kicking a goal again and averaging 30.3 disposals per game in his first three matches. Despite his best efforts, the club won just one of these first three games. The Age's Rohan Connolly labelled Cotchin the Tigers' best across this period but questioned the captain's on-field support. In round 4, Cotchin was subject to a stifling tag by Collingwood's Brent Macaffer. He was held to just 13 disposals (at 46% efficiency), his lowest disposal count in a match since round 16, 2010. Cotchin later appeared on the Seven Network's Game Day program, saying "at times, (he) thought (he) was being held illegally." Brisbane head of coaching Peter Schwab said during the week following that the Lions would also tag Cotchin in the clubs' upcoming round 5 match. Despite this effort, Cotchin had a marked return to form, gathering 32 disposals and kicked a goal in the match against Brisbane. After seven rounds, Cotchin held an average of 25.9 disposals per game.

He suffered a minor ankle injury in the club's round 8 loss to Melbourne. Cotchin did not a miss a game as a result however, passing a fitness test to qualify for the club's round 10 match against Greater Western Sydney. After 13 matches, the club stood at just three wins, making a return to finals nearly impossible. The AFL's statistical partner Champion Data gave the club just a 0.6% chance of making finals.

In round 15, Cotchin kicked a career-best five goals and recorded 31 disposals in a win against St Kilda. He became the first Richmond player to achieve thirty or more disposals and five or more goals in 23 years. He received the Ian Stewart Medal for this best afield performance. After six consecutive wins, Cotchin played down expectations that Richmond could pull off an improbable comeback to play finals, saying "talk about fairytales and so forth. We're not really interested in that." Richmond would eventually complete the fairytale, winning nine straight matches and finishing the season in eighth position.

Richmond would ultimately fall in the first elimination final, losing to Port Adelaide by 57 points at the Adelaide Oval. Cotchin received significant criticism for his decision to kick into the wind when he won the pre-game coin toss. Cotchin was defended publicly by coach Damien Hardwick despite Port Adelaide kicking seven goals in the first seventeen minutes kicking with the wind.

At the end of the season, Cotchin won his third Jack Dyer Medal. He became the equal second youngest player in AFL history to have won three best and fairest awards and the youngest Richmond player to do so. He polled 18 votes in that year's Brownlow Medal count, becoming the first player in Richmond history to record four seasons with 15 or more votes in the award.

=== 2015 season ===
Cotchin stands alongside Luke Hodge as the two best captains this season. Cotchin's ability to deliver in the big moments like Hodge has set the Richmond skipper apart from the rest of the pack this year.

— Jonothan Brown, former Brisbane Lions captain and Fox Footy commentator – 2015

In December 2014 Cotchin signed a 5-year contract extension with Richmond, tying him to the club until the end of the 2020 season. In doing so he shrugged off a reportedly lucrative offer from Hawthorn.

In the 2015 pre-season, Cotchin managed minor hamstring soreness. This saw him on a slightly reduced training workload, with a focus to being available for round 1. He did however miss the first two of the club's pre-season matches as a result.

Cotchin started the season slowly, recording just seventeen disposals and one clearance in the club's round 1 win against Carlton. In April, he received criticism from Herald Sun journalist Mark Robinson for a "safe" play-style. Robinson scolded Cotchin for his inability to impact the scoreboard with goals and goal assists and questioned his recent history of defensive kicking, specifically his average of just five metres gained per kick in round 2. When Coach Hardwick labelled the club's round 4 loss to Melbourne as "insipid", Cotchin responded by promising the media that his team would "make sure we're more consistent." It would prove an empty promise, with the Tigers again falling, this time at the hand of Geelong. To this point, Cotchin ranked 66th in the league for metres gained and 18th for lateral or backward kicks. AFL Media's Peter Ryan suggested this was an underachievement for Cotchin, but more specifically that he was not damaging enough to be considered "a great player".

Cotchin was lauded by Coach Hardwick for a "great captain's game" in the club's round 7 win against Collingwood. Cotchin recorded thirty-two disposals, six clearances and kicked two goals in the match. He was again praised for his on-field leadership in round 14, this time against Greater Western Sydney. In July, former Brisbane premiership player and current Fox Footy commentator Jonathan Brown said Cotchin had "taken his game to another level especially in the leadership stakes." Back soreness kept Cotchin from playing in round 22, his only missed game for the season.

At the end of the home and away season, Richmond finished fifth, qualifying for a home elimination final. Cotchin thus became the first Richmond captain since Royce Hart to lead teams to finals in each of his first three seasons. For the third straight season however, the club would lose its first final, this time by 17 points at the hands of North Melbourne. Held by North Melbourne tagger Ben Jacobs, Cotchin gathered just nine possessions with only four effective disposals. It was the equal lowest disposal count in his 153-game career to-date.

=== 2016 season ===
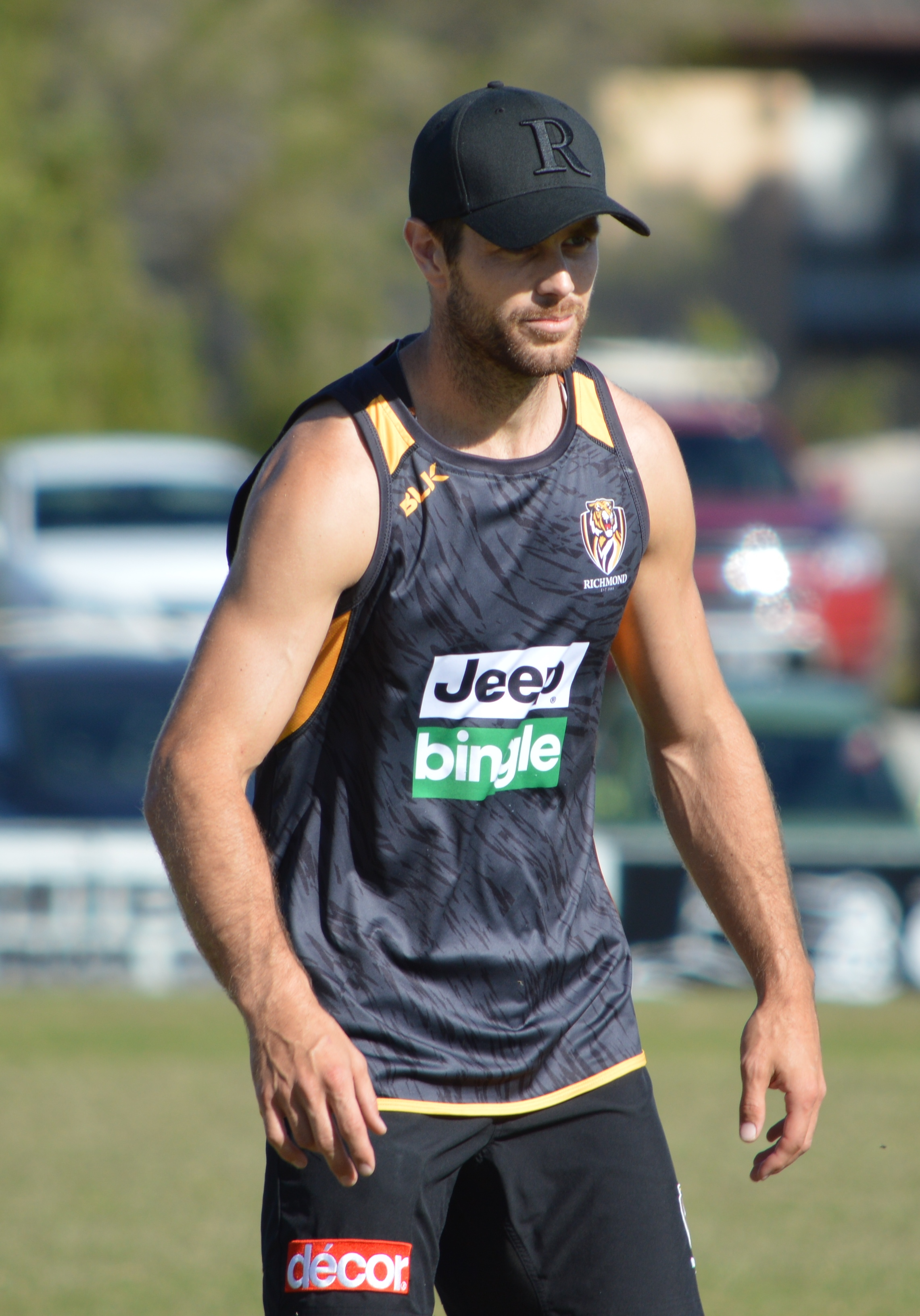
Cotchin at Richmond's family day in December 2016

Prior to the 2016 pre-season, the Herald Sun's Mark Robinson published a criticism of Cotchin's captaincy, suggesting the club's three straight finals losses were reason to remove him from the role, with forward Jack Riewoldt his preferred replacement. Riewoldt rubbished the suggestion, declaring the Richmond leadership group "second to none" and backing Cotchin as the best man for the job. Cotchin ultimately remained in the role, with the club confirming him for a fourth consecutive term as skipper in January 2016.

Going into the season, Hardwick stressed the need to relieve Cotchin of elements of his inside-midfield role. Hardwick claimed the club was asking Cotchin "to fulfil a role for his body size that he is incapable of doing" and that continuing to do so without proper midfield support could see Cotchin's career shortened significantly. Cotchin' captaincy was again criticised in April, this time by Fox Footy's David King. In a television broadcast the day after Richmond's round 2 loss to Collingwood, he said Cotchin's leadership was a detriment to the club and that he should be replaced at season's end.

Cotchin received defence over the repeated comments and praise for his leadership from rival players Luke Hodge and Patrick Dangerfield in the weeks that followed. Hardwick labelled the criticism "unjust and farcical." Cotchin was also defended publicly by his wife Brooke, who took to Instagram to show support for his leadership qualities. She reiterated her support in a Herald Sun interview, sparking a mini-controversy over the public role of footballers' partners.

Meanwhile, Cotchin was quietly having a strong start to the season, averaging 30.4 disposals and 6.8 clearances in each of the club's first five matches. In round 6, Cotchin suffered a fractured cheekbone. Though he sustained the injury in the opening moments of the match, he played on through the end of the 35 point loss. He missed two matches as a result, returning to the club's round 9 side to play Fremantle. Cotchin recorded a career high 39 disposals in his return. He missed a week of training ahead of round 12, forced into hospital for a day after contracting a virus. He did not miss a match however, contributing a goal and 28 disposals (12 in the last quarter) in Richmond's win over Gold Coast. To this point he was averaging career highs in disposals, contested possessions, clearances and uncontested possessions. Despite his strong performances, the club would fail to qualify for the finals for the first time under his captaincy. He finished the season having played 20 matches, topping the club for total clearances and second in disposals per game. Cotchin placed third in the club's best and fairest that year, behind Dustin Martin and Alex Rance.

In a Herald Sun article penned in May the following year, Cotchin referred to 2016 as "the worst season of (his) career and the most challenging year of (his) life" on the back of the club's performance and the self-imposed pressures of success. He revealed he spent the off-season reassessing his leadership style and contemplating whether or not to continue on as Richmond captain.

=== 2017 season ===
Questions over Cotchin's role as captain continued into the 2017 pre-season, this time from departing Richmond development coach Mark Williams. Though Williams described Cotchin as a "wonderful leader," he insisted that Cotchin would become a better player without the added pressure of captaincy. In spite of the outside pressures, he was again appointed to captain the club when a three-man leadership group was announced in mid-March.

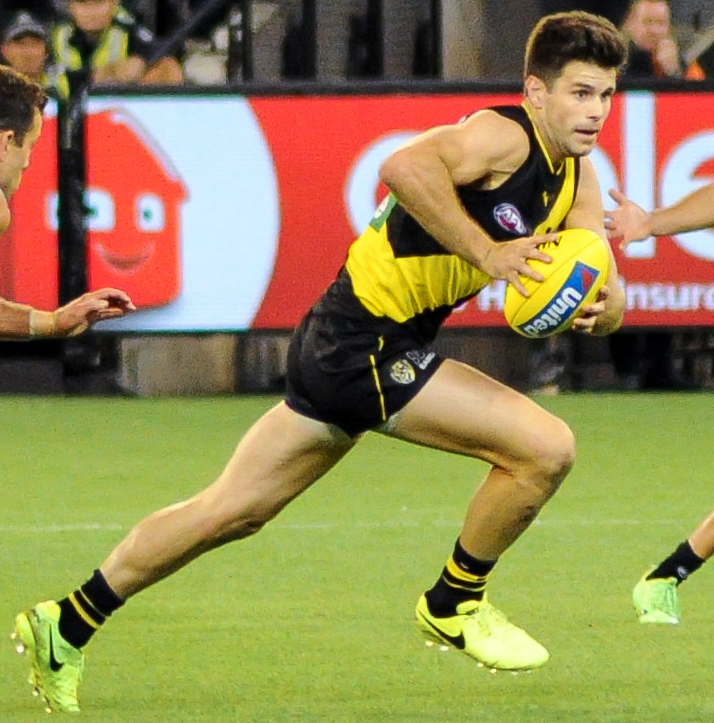
Cotchin wins a clearance in Round 2, 2017

His performance in Round 2 saw him named best-on-ground by Fox Footy, after recording 26 disposals, seven clearances, eight inside 50s, two goals and a game-high seven tackles in the win over Collingwood. After five rounds Richmond remained unbeaten, the best start to a season in Cotchin's time as captain and the best at the club since 1995. In Round 6's loss to Adelaide, Cotchin recorded game-highs in tackles (11) and pressure acts (33) and team-highs for disposals (26), contested possessions (16) and metres gained (502). Cotchin captained Richmond for the 100th time in Round 7, 2017, in a match against the Western Bulldogs. He became just the fifth player in the club's history to do so after Percy Bentley, Jack Dyer, Des Rowe and Matthew Knights. Cotchin's seven tackles recorded in Round 8 that year saw him take the club record for most career tackles (from former teammate Brett Deledio). In the same match he was reported for a jumper-punch on Fremantle midfielder Lachie Neale. He escaped suspension for the incident, accepting a $1,000 fine for his actions. In June Cotchin was named in the top ten midfielders in the competition according to Triple M and Seven Network commentator Wayne Carey. He was also named on the interchange bench in AFL Media's mid-season All Australian team. At the bye following round 11 he was the club leader for tackles, and placed eight in the league for the season.

Cotchin returned from the bye in fine form, recording 28 disposals and a goal in round 13 against Sydney. In round 16 he escaped the Match Review Panel with only a fine, this time for a gut punch to the stomach of St Kilda's Jack Lonie . When the All Australian squad was named in late August, Cotchin was listed as a notable omission by numerous media organisations including The Advertiser, Fox Sports and The Age. Coach Hardwick noted his surprise too, labelling Cotchin's season "phenomenal".

At the end of the home & away season, Cotchin had led Richmond to its first top four finish in 16 years. Facing Geelong in a qualifying final, Cotchin delivered a "blistering captain's performance" to see his side to victory. He finished with 20 disposals, seven clearances, a goal and a game-high nine tackles in what was the club's first finals win under his leadership. Cotchin backed it up the following week when his Tigers won a preliminary final and progressed to the Grand Final for the first time in 35 years. His path to play in the match was under a cloud however, with a bump on Greater Western Sydney's Dylan Shiel coming under some scrutiny after the Giant finished the game with concussion. Having been fined twice prior in the season, a fine of any amount would see Cotchin automatically suspended under the three strike rule. The Match Review Panel ultimately cleared him of all charges however, determining his hit came in the process of contesting the ball and was not eligible for any sanction. It was a highly controversial decision at the time, with media experts and the public-at-large split on the decision. Cotchin's Richmond entered the Grand Final as underdogs the following week, facing minor premiers Adelaide. Despite the odds, Cotchin lead the team to an historic 48 point victory, captaining the club to its first premiership since 1980. He set a new club record for tackles in a season (139), and placed fourth in the club's best and fairest count.

=== 2018 season ===
Just prior to the start of the 2018 season Cotchin was named the league's 23rd best player by a Players Association poll, up 25 spots from the year previous. He opened the season with 24 disposals in a victory over Carlton in round 1 before spending a night in hospital in the lead up to round 2 as the result of a severe migraine. Cotchin recovered fully overnight and traveled with the team to play against Adelaide in what would be the 200th match of his career. The following week he received a maximum 10 Coaches Association Award votes as the coaches' unanimous best-on-ground following 31 disposals and six tackles in a win over Hawthorn. Cotchin repeated the effort in round 6, earning 10 votes after recording a game high 18 contested possessions and 29 disposals in a win over Collingwood. He suffered a minor knock to his left knee during a collision with a goal post during that win however and was considered in some doubt for the club's match against Fremantle the following week. He was named to play in that match during team announcements, but was a late withdrawal just before game was due to begin. It was his first match missed through injury since May 2016. Cotchin's absence was contained to one match, making a return against North Melbourne in round 8 where he was exceptional, recording 22 contested possessions to equal the second-most in a match by any Richmond player in club history. To that point he had recorded the equal-fifth most votes (37) in the AFL Coaches Association's champion player of the year award. After an impressive 32 disposals, nine clearances and eight score involvements against St Kilda in round 10, 3AW commentator Tim Lane labelled Cotchin "the best player in the game" following a superb stretch of form from round 6 onward in particular. At the half-way point of the season Cotchin was named in AFL Media and Fox Footy's mid-year All Australian squads while also being named in the Herald Sun's team of 22 players. Cotchin had a significantly reduced impact statistically in the second half of the season, recording more than 20 disposals only twice in the final 11 weeks of the regular season. His defensive work was impressive though, including when he recorded a game high nine tackles and the highest pressure point count of any player in the league in round 20. A minor hamstring injury in round 21 saw Cotchin play significantly reduced minutes in that match and miss the entirety of the club's round 22 win over Essendon. He returned for the final match of the home and away season in round 23, recording 17 disposals in a win over the Western Bulldogs. At that time, Cotchin was named in the 40-man squad but went ultimately unselected for the All-Australian team. He was also voted as the league's best captain, following a landslide Players Association vote. After finishing the season as minor premiers, Cotchin's side earned a home qualifying final against Hawthorn where he led the team to a win, recording 26 disposals, seven clearances and being named among Richmond's best by AFL Media. Despite being again named among Richmond's best players, Cotchin's finals run would extend just one more match when Richmond was eliminated with a shock preliminary final loss to rivals Collingwood. Following the conclusion of the 2018 finals series, Cotchin attracted his highest Brownlow Medal vote tally in four years (10 votes) and placed seventh in the Richmond club best and fairest award.

=== 2019 season ===
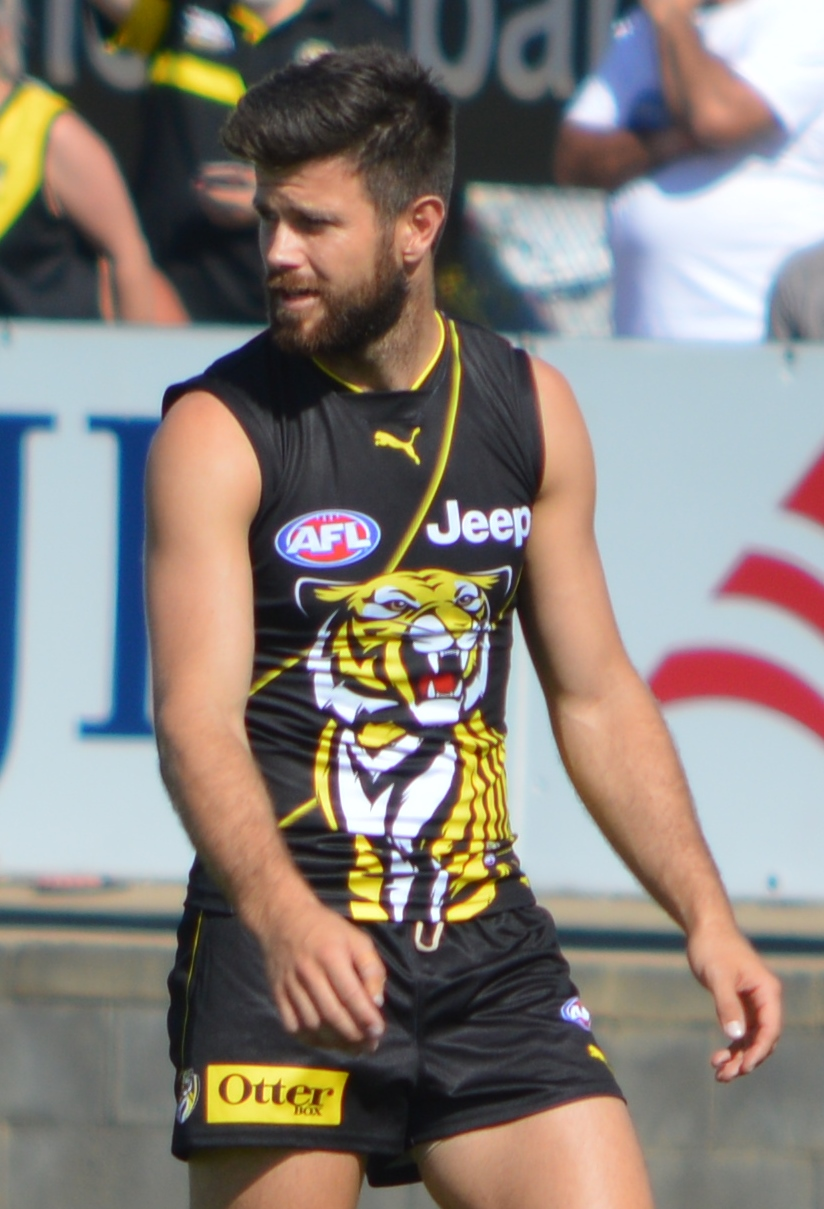
Cotchin during a Richmond pre-season match in March 2019

Cotchin started his 2019 pre-season with a limited training schedule due to his relative seniority among Richmond players and his large playing load over the previous two seasons. During that time, he was ranked the 46th best player in the league in the AFL's official statistical player ratings. Cotchin captained the club in each of its two pre-season matches in February and March before recording 31 disposals and earning the maximum three Brownlow votes and maximum 10 coaches association award votes in round 1's season-opening win over Carlton. In round 3, Cotchin suffered an apparently minor hamstring injury in the third quarter of a loss to Greater Western Sydney. Initial estimations placed a two-to-three week time frame on his recovery, but a setback in mid-April pushed his expected return date to at least round 8. That date continued to be extended in May, before he finally made his return after seven weeks on the sidelines in Richmond's round 11 loss to North Melbourne. Cotchin recorded 15 disposals in the first half of that match, before finishing with 23 disposals from 72 per cent time on ground. He added another 22 disposals the following week before a six-day break forced Cotchin out as a matchday eve withdrawal with hamstring soreness in round 13. After missing that match and following the club's mid-season bye, Cotchin returned to football with 19 disposals in round 15's win over St Kilda. He was exceptional the following week, recording 27 disposals and two goals to earn a place in Richmond's bests that day, five coaches votes and selection to AFL Media's team of the week. In round 18 he played his 150th match as Richmond captain, becoming the third player in club history to do so. One week later he suffered yet another hamstring injury, this time in the opening minutes of his side's round 19 win over Collingwood. Scans returned the following day revealed the injury to be minor, with a two-to-three week time frame placed upon his recovery. Following two weeks of full training, Cotchin made a return to matchplay in round 23 where he recorded 15 disposals in a modest performance. He was named by AFL Media as one of his side's best players in the opening round of the finals, contributing 19 disposals and five clearances in their 47-point qualifying final victory over the Brisbane Lions. In the preliminary final a fortnight later, Cotchin contributed what AFL Media described as "another solid performance" with 14 disposals, six tackles and four clearances. After a poor first half in which Richmond trailed, Cotchin laid a tackle in the opening seconds of the third quarter that the Herald Sun labelled instrumental in sparking a second-half turnaround and an eventual victory over Geelong. In the grand final, Cotchin record 15 disposals and kicked a final-quarter goal as Richmond defeated Greater Western Sydney by 89 points and Cotchin led the club to a second premiership in three years. In doing so, he equaled a club record as one of five players to captain the club to two premierships, for which coach Damien Hardwick said he would "go down as one of the great leaders and great players" of the club and for which Herald Sun chief football reporter Mark Robinson labelled him a "Tigers legend" and "arguably the best captain in the AFL". At the end of the year, Cotchin placed 19th in the club's best and fairest count after playing 14 matches in total that season.

=== 2020 season ===
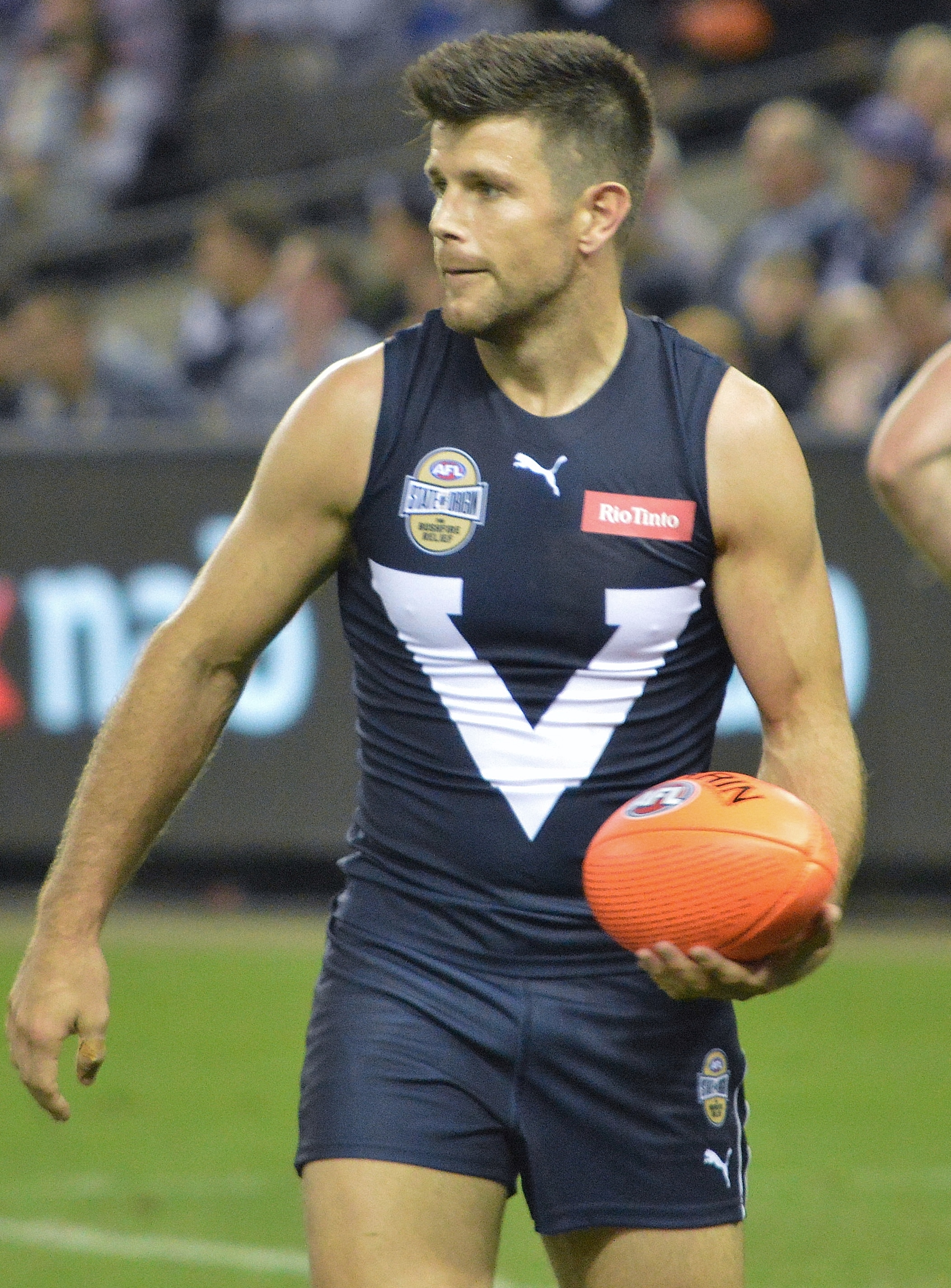
Cotchin captaining Victoria in the 2020 State of Origin for Bushfire Relief match

Cotchin played his first match for the year in the AFL's fundraising State of Origin for Bushfire Relief Match in February, being named among his side's best players by AFL Media after captaining Victoria to a 46-point victory over the All-Stars. He sat out Richmond's first pre-season match that same weekend but returned for the club's final pre-season match against Greater Western Sydney a week later. Cotchin captained Richmond to a round 1 win over Carlton when the season began a fortnight later, but under extraordinary conditions imposed on the league as a result of the rapid progression of the coronavirus pandemic into Australia. In what the league planned would be the first of a reduced 17-round season, the match was played without crowds in attendance due to public health prohibitions on large gatherings and with quarter lengths reduced by one fifth in order to reduce the physical load on players who would be expected to play multiple matches with short breaks in the second half of the year. Just three days later, the AFL Commission suspended the season after multiple states enforced quarantine conditions on their borders that effectively ruled out the possibility of continuing the season as planned. After an 11-week hiatus, Cotchin led Richmond to a round 2 draw with Collingwood in early-June in which he was among the best players on the field, recording 23 disposals and receiving four Coaches' votes. He received another one vote for 23 disposals and six score involvements in round 4, before suffering a minor hamstring injury in round's 5 win over Melbourne. Cotchin began rehabilitating the injury over the week that followed, during which time he and the club were relocated to the Gold Coast in response to a virus outbreak in Melbourne. After three matches on the sidelines, Cotchin returned with 17 disposals and six tackles in a win over the Western Bulldogs in which he also received three coaches votes as the fourth best player in the game. The following week, Cotchin passed club legend Jack Dyer to claim outright second place on the club record list for games played as captain (161). Cotchin was rested for one match in round 11, but returned with a best on ground performance against the Gold Coast, earning nine coaches votes for a performance that included a game-high nine clearances and a team-high 26 disposals. He was once again best on ground in a win over West Coast two weeks later, receiving another nine coaches votes for another 26 disposal performance. After leading his side to a third place regular season finish, Cotchin contributed his first and only goal of the season in a qualifying loss to the Brisbane Lions in the opening week of the finals. Tying Percy Bentley's club record for most games as captain in that match, he broke it one week later during his 169th game in charge, a semi-final victory over St Kilda. He hit another milestone in the preliminary final that followed, playing his 250th career match and contributing a game-high 13 contested possessions in a six-point win over Port Adelaide. Cotchin became Richmond's first ever three-time premiership captain the following week, adding 19 disposals in what AFL Media described as a "typically fierce" performance, lifting his side to a 31-point Grand Final victory over Geelong. Capping another premiership season in which he played 17 of a possible 21 matches, Cotchin earned tenth place in the club's best and fairest count.

=== 2021 season ===
Cotchin participated in Richmond's sole pre-season match, before being named in the club's round 1 side to play Carlton and then later ruled out as a late change due to a stomach illness. He recovered fully over the week that followed and featured in round 2's win over Hawthorn with 27 disposals, seven inside 50s and a career-high 634 metres gained. Cotchin suffered some minor hamstring soreness late in round 3's loss to Sydney, but was fit to play the following week, where he was named among Richmond's best players by AFL Media despite the close loss to Port Adelaide. He was recognised with two coaches votes for a 21 disposal and five clearance performance against St Kilda in round 5, before injuring his hamstring in another vote-getting performance during round 7's win over the Western Bulldogs. Cotchin would miss three matches with the injury, returning in round 11's match against Adelaide, which was played in Sydney due to a minor COVID-19 outbreak and lockdown in Melbourne. He played in all of the club's matches over the next month, including during a three-week period where they were relocated to Sydney and Perth.

On 14 September 2021, Cotchin stepped down as Richmond captain, stating that the time was right to do.

=== 2023 season ===
On 10 August 2023, Cotchin announced that he would retire at the end of the 2023 season. He, along with fellow retiree Jack Riewoldt, played his final match in round 23 against North Melbourne at the Melbourne Cricket Ground.

== Post-playing career ==
After retiring, Cotchin joined the Brisbane Lions in March 2024 as a leadership mentor. Cotchin was a part of the club as they enjoyed triple premiership success in 2024, 2025 and 2026.

== Player profile ==
Cotchin plays as a ball-winning inside midfielder. He is capable of playing as a resting forward after long periods of play on-ball.

In the 2019/20 off-season Cotchin was labelled the 23rd best player overall in the Herald Sun's list of the best players of the 2010s. In 2020, Cotchin was named by the Herald Sun as Richmond's fifth best player of the AFL era and following his 2020 premiership victory, he became the club's first three-time premiership winning captain.

At the end of the 2020 season, Cotchin was ranked the season's 46th best player in the Herald Sun's list of the best players of the year.

== Statistics ==
Updated to the end of the 2023 season.

Legend
G	Goals	K	Kicks	D	Disposals	T	Tackles
B	Behinds	H	Handballs	M	Marks
#	Played in that season's premiership team	±	Won that season's Brownlow Medal

Season	Team	No.	Games	Totals							Averages (per game)							Votes
Season	Team	No.	Games	G	B	K	H	D	M	T	G	B	K	H	D	M	T	Votes
2008	Richmond	9	15	9	5	134	112	246	73	32	0.6	0.3	8.9	7.5	16.4	4.9	2.1	2
2009	Richmond	9	10	3	2	86	91	177	40	21	0.3	0.2	8.6	9.1	17.7	4	2.1	1
2010	Richmond	9	17	4	6	202	130	332	40	66	0.2	0.4	11.9	7.7	18.6	2.4	3.9	2
2011	Richmond	9	22	18	18	372	158	530	80	73	0.8	0.8	16.9	7.2	24.1	3.6	3.3	15
2012	Richmond	9	22	21	16	372	234	606	92	107	1.0	0.7	16.9	10.6	27.5	4.2	4.9	26^{±}
2013	Richmond	9	22	6	9	365	206	571	86	75	0.3	0.4	16.6	9.4	26.0	3.9	3.4	19
2014	Richmond	9	23	18	11	360	237	597	80	95	0.8	0.4	15.7	10.3	26.0	3.5	4.1	18
2015	Richmond	9	22	12	13	313	227	540	71	74	0.5	0.6	14.2	10.3	24.5	3.2	3.4	17
2016	Richmond	9	20	10	6	291	248	539	56	92	0.5	0.3	14.6	12.4	27.0	2.8	4.6	9
2017^{#}	Richmond	9	25	17	8	347	243	590	85	139	0.7	0.3	13.9	9.7	23.6	3.4	5.6	8
2018	Richmond	9	22	5	13	255	230	485	49	103	0.2	0.6	11.6	10.5	22.0	2.2	4.7	10
2019^{#}	Richmond	9	14	3	2	159	118	277	37	44	0.2	0.1	11.4	8.4	19.8	2.6	3.1	6
2020^{#} (Note: The 2020 season was played with 17 home-and-away matches per team (down from 22) and 16-minute quarters with time on (down from 20-minute quarters with time on) due to the impact of the COVID-19 pandemic.)	Richmond	9	17	1	3	176	135	311	39	55	0.1	0.2	10.4	7.9	18.3	2.3	3.2	5
2021	Richmond	9	17	2	0	206	147	353	53	57	0.1	0.0	12.1	8.6	20.8	3.1	3.4	3
2022	Richmond	9	19	5	3	220	211	431	59	54	0.3	0.2	11.6	11.1	22.7	3.1	2.8	5
2023	Richmond	9	19	7	8	161	150	311	53	45	0.4	0.4	8.5	7.9	16.4	2.8	2.4	2
Career			306	141	123	4019	2877	6896	993	1132	0.5	0.4	13.1	9.4	22.5	3.2	3.7	148

== Honours and achievements ==
**Brownlow Medal votes**
Season	Votes
2008	2
2009	1
2010	2
2011	15
**2012**	**26**
2013	19
2014	18
2015	17
2016	9
2017	8
2018	10
2019	6
2020	5
2021	3
2022	5
2023	2
**Total**	**148**
Key:
Green / **Bold** = Won

Team

- 3× AFL premiership player (Richmond): 2017, 2019, 2020
- McClelland Trophy (Richmond): 2018

Individual

- AFL
  - 3× AFL premiership captain: 2017, 2019, 2020
  - Brownlow Medal: 2012
  - AFLCA Champion Player of the Year: 2012
  - All-Australian team: 2012
  - All-Australian Squad: 2018
  - AFLPA best captain: 2018
  - 22under22 team: 2012
  - AFL Rising Star nominee: 2008
  - The Age Player of the Year: 2012
  - Yiooken Award: 2011
  - Ian Stewart Medal: 2014
- Richmond
  - 3× Jack Dyer Medal (1st RFC B&F): 2011, 2012, 2014
  - Maurie Fleming Medal (3rd RFC B&F): 2016
  - Fred Swift Medal (4th RFC B&F): 2017
  - Kevin Bartlett Medal (5th RFC B&F): 2013
  - Richmond captain: 2013–2021
  - Most single season tackles record holder: 2017
  - **Most career tackles record holder**
  - **Most games as Richmond captain record holder**
- Junior
  - U/16 Vic Metro captain: 2006

== Personal life ==
In December 2013, Cotchin married his high school sweetheart, long-term girlfriend and daughter of former Western Bulldogs player Rick Kennedy, Brooke Kennedy in a ceremony at Flinders, Victoria. They have two daughters and a son, born March 2014, June 2016 and July 2019.

=== The Draft: Inside the AFL's Search for Talent ===
Cotchin was one of five teenage footballers whose final year of junior football and first five seasons in the AFL were chronicled in the book The Draft: Inside the AFL's Search for Talent by Emma Quayle.
