= Geoff Spring =

Australian rules footballer

Personal information
- Born: 20 April 1925
- Died: 3 October 1997 (aged 72)
- Original team: Balwyn/Williamstown (VFA)
- Height: 170 cm (5 ft 7 in)
- Weight: 68 kg (150 lb)

Playing career^{1}
Years	Club	Games (Goals)
1948–1957	Richmond	147 (63)
- ^{1} Playing statistics correct to the end of 1957.

Career highlights
- Richmond Best and Fairest 1949; Interstate Games: 4

Geoff Spring (20 April 1925 – 3 October 1997) was an Australian rules football player who played in the Victorian Football League (VFL) in between 1948 and 1957 for the Richmond Football Club.
