= Adam Havlík =

Czech ice hockey forward

- Born: January 14, 1991 (age 34); Znojmo, Czechoslovakia
- Height: 5 ft 9 in (175 cm)
- Weight: 165 lb (75 kg; 11 st 11 lb)
- Position: Forward
- Shoots: Left
- Czech 2.liga team Former teams: Orli Znojmo; HC Dynamo Pardubice; PSG Berani Zlín; Herning Blue Fox; Scorpions de Mulhouse
- Playing career: 2008–present

Adam Havlík (born January 14, 1991) is a Czech professional ice hockey forward for Orli Znojmo of the Czech 2.liga.

Havlík previously played for Orli in the Czech Extraliga and the Erste Bank Eishockey Liga. He also played for HC Dynamo Pardubice and PSG Berani Zlín as well in the Metal Ligaen for Herning Blue Fox and the Ligue Magnus for Scorpions de Mulhouse.
