= Sid Reeves =

Australian rules footballer

Personal information
- Full name: Sydney William Reeves
- Born: 29 August 1891; Williamstown, Victoria
- Died: 22 May 1962 (aged 70); Melbourne, Victoria
- Original team: Korumburra
- Height: 177 cm (5 ft 10 in)
- Weight: 67 kg (148 lb)

Playing career^{1}
Years	Club	Games (Goals)
1910–1919	Richmond	110 (7)
- ^{1} Playing statistics correct to the end of 1919.

Sydney William Reeves (29 August 1891 – 22 May 1962) was an Australian rules footballer who played in the VFL between 1910 and 1919 for the Richmond Football Club.

After leaving Richmond he played with Hawthorn in the Victorian Football Association, making 39 appearances between 1920 and 1922.
