= Vladimír Havlík =

- Born: 7 February 1959 (age 67); Nové Město na Moravě, Czechoslovakia
- Occupations: Action artist, painter, pedagogue
- Writing career
- Years active: 1977–present

Vladimír Havlík (born 7 February 1959) is a Czech action artist, painter and pedagogue.

== Education ==
Havlík was educated at Palacký University (1978–1983) under the tutelage of Prof. Alena Nádvorníková, and at Jan Evangelista Purkyně University (1999).

== Action art ==
Art historian Pavlína Morganová has described Havlík's key role in the early days of Czechoslovak action art:

Perceiving nature and establishing bodily contact with it appears in the 1980s in a number of actions by Vladimír Havlík. A longing for people to be together on the first day of spring led to the organization of several actions to welcome spring. The first vítání jara (Welcoming Spring) took place in 1978. The playful atmosphere, the launching of paper boats down a river and a simple ritual in which a group of the artist's friends sat in a circle and used little mirrors to reflect the sun's rays onto the seeds planted in a flowerpot, is essentially an ingenious happening. It was actually about nothing more than being together for a while and being aware of the sprouting and budding that happens each year around us, whether we notice it or not. Another of Havlík's actions took place a year later, entitled Zahřívání stromu—Vítání jara (Tree Warming—Welcoming Spring). The ground was covered with snow, and it did not seem like the first spring day, which is probably why none of Havlík's friends came. Nevertheless, he went through with the action in a park where he warmed the trunk of one small tree with his bare hands.

According to Czech curator and art historian Tomáš Pospiszyl,

Vladimír Havlík of Moravia would organize parties for friends. Sometimes it was difficult to distinguish whether it was a party or a happening or a performance. Or maybe it was a strategy to endure the bad times and find a way to express creativity and build a small niche where one could live under the conditions we had.

In 2015, on being awarded the annual Umělec má cenu prize in Olomouc, where he lives, Havlík reflected that he is always interested in "experiencing actions again" in the same places where he had initially practiced action art under the Czech communist regime during the 1980s. Moreover, nowadays he enjoys doing so in collaboration with younger artists such as Barborou Klímovou.
