= Havel Rowe =

Australian rules footballer (1928–2019)

- Rowe with Richmond

Personal information
- Full name: Stuart Havel Rowe
- Born: 8 May 1928
- Died: 30 March 2019 (aged 90)
- Original team: Geelong College/Ormond (VAFA)
- Height: 178 cm (5 ft 10 in)
- Weight: 73 kg (161 lb)

Playing career^{1}
| Years | Club | Games (Goals) |
| 1948–1957 | Richmond | 124 (43) |
- ^{1} Playing statistics correct to the end of 1957.

Career highlights
- Richmond Best and Fairest 1953; Richmond Hall of Fame, inducted 2015

Stuart Havel Rowe (8 May 1928 – 30 March 2019) was an Australian rules football player who played for the Richmond Football Club in the VFL from 1948 to 1957.

== Biography ==
Rowe played school football at Geelong College before moving to Melbourne, where he played with amateur club Ormond before joining the Tigers.

He won Richmond's Best and Fairest award in 1953, and received life membership of the club immediately after retiring at the end of the 1957 season. In 2015 he was inducted into the Richmond Hall of Fame.

== Sources ==
- Hogan P: The Tigers Of Old, Richmond FC, Melbourne 1996
- Vale Havel Rowe
