= Radek Havel (ice hockey) =

Czech ice hockey player

- Born: May 30, 1994 (age 30); Chomutov, Czech Republic
- Height: 6 ft 2 in (188 cm)
- Weight: 212 lb (96 kg; 15 st 2 lb)
- Position: Defence
- Shoots: Left
- Czech Extraliga team: Piráti Chomutov
- NHL draft: Undrafted
- Playing career: 2013–present

Radek Havel (born May 30, 1994) is a Czech professional ice hockey defenceman. He currently plays with Piráti Chomutov in the Czech Extraliga.

== Playing career ==
Havel made his Czech Extraliga debut playing with Piráti Chomutov during the 2012–13 Czech Extraliga season.
