= Havell =

Havell in an English surname. Notable people with the surname include:

- Havell family, an English family which produced notable artists
- Ernest Binfield Havell (1861–1934), English arts administrator, art historian and author
- Paul Havell (born 1980), Australian-born English cricketer
- William Havell (1782–1857), English landscape painter
