= Stefan Havlik =

Slovak bodybuilder and soldier

- Professional bodybuilder

Personal info
- Born: September 10, 1975 (age 51); Košice, Czechoslovakia

Best statistics
- Contest weight: 105 kg
- Height: 175 cm (5 ft 9 in)
- Off-season weight: 115 kg

Professional (Pro) career
- Pro-debut: Wings of Strength Chicago; 2013

Stefan Havlik (born September 10, 1975) is a Slovak professional bodybuilder in the IFBB and a soldier. He is the founder and CEO of the fitness website Workoutic.

Born in Košice, he currently resides in Miami. He is a World Champion in Amateur Bodybuilding (2003), and a quintuple European Champion in the same category (2001, 2006 + mix pair, 2010, 2011).

== Bodybuilding competition overview ==
- 2000:
  - European Amateur Championships – IFBB, Light-HeavyWeight, 6th
- 2001:
  - European Amateur Championships – IFBB, Light-HeavyWeight, 1st
  - World Amateur Championships – IFBB, Light-HeavyWeight, 8th
  - World Games, HeavyWeight, 4th
- 2002:
  - World Amateur Championships – IFBB, Light-HeavyWeight, 10th
- 2003:
  - World Amateur Championships – IFBB, MiddleWeight, 1st
- 2005:
  - European Amateur Championships – IFBB, Light-HeavyWeight, 3rd
  - World Amateur Championships – IFBB, Light-HeavyWeight, 4th
- 2006:
  - European Amateur Championships – IFBB, Light-HeavyWeight, 1st
  - World Amateur Championships – IFBB, HeavyWeight, 2nd
- 2007:
  - World Amateur Championships – IFBB, HeavyWeight, 2nd
- 2009:
  - World Amateur Championships – IFBB, HeavyWeight, 10th
- 2010:
  - European Amateur Championships – IFBB, Light-HeavyWeight, 1st
  - European Amateur Championships – IFBB, Light-HeavyWeight, Overall Winner
- 2011:
  - European Amateur Championships – IFBB, Light-HeavyWeight, 1st
- 2012:
  - Havlik was the overall winner of the Arnold Amateur Bodybuilding Competition held in Columbus, Ohio, March 3–5
- International GP Overall Winner:
  - GP SLOVAKIA - SLOVAKIA 2001, 2005, 2006, 2007
  - CUP TATRA MOUNTAIN - SLOVAKIA 2005, 2006, 2007, 2009
  - INT. GROSSER PREIS VON ÖSTERREICH - AUSTRIA 2005
  - GP ALL STARS FIBO - GERMANY 2003
  - AMINOSTAR CUP 05- CZECH REPUBLIC 2005
  - GP PEPA - CZECH REPUBLIC 2005
  - LOADED CUP - DENMARK 2006
  - GP CHARLEROI XV - BELGIUM 2006
  - STAVANGER OPEN - NORWAY 2009
  - SANDEFJORD OPEN - NORWAY 2010,2011
  - ALEXANDER THE GREAT - GREECE 2011
- IFBB PRO results:
  - Wings of Strength Chicago 2013 7th place
  - Ferrigno Legacy - Santa Barbara 2014 6th place
  - Vancouver Pro 2015 4th place
  - Tampa Pro 2015 4th place
  - Sacramento Pro 2015 3rd place
  - Texas Pro 2015 5th place
  - Europa Games 2015 5th place

== Proportions ==
- Height: 175 cm
- Weight: 115 kg
- Weight (in season): 105 kg
