= Luke McGuane =

Australian rules footballer

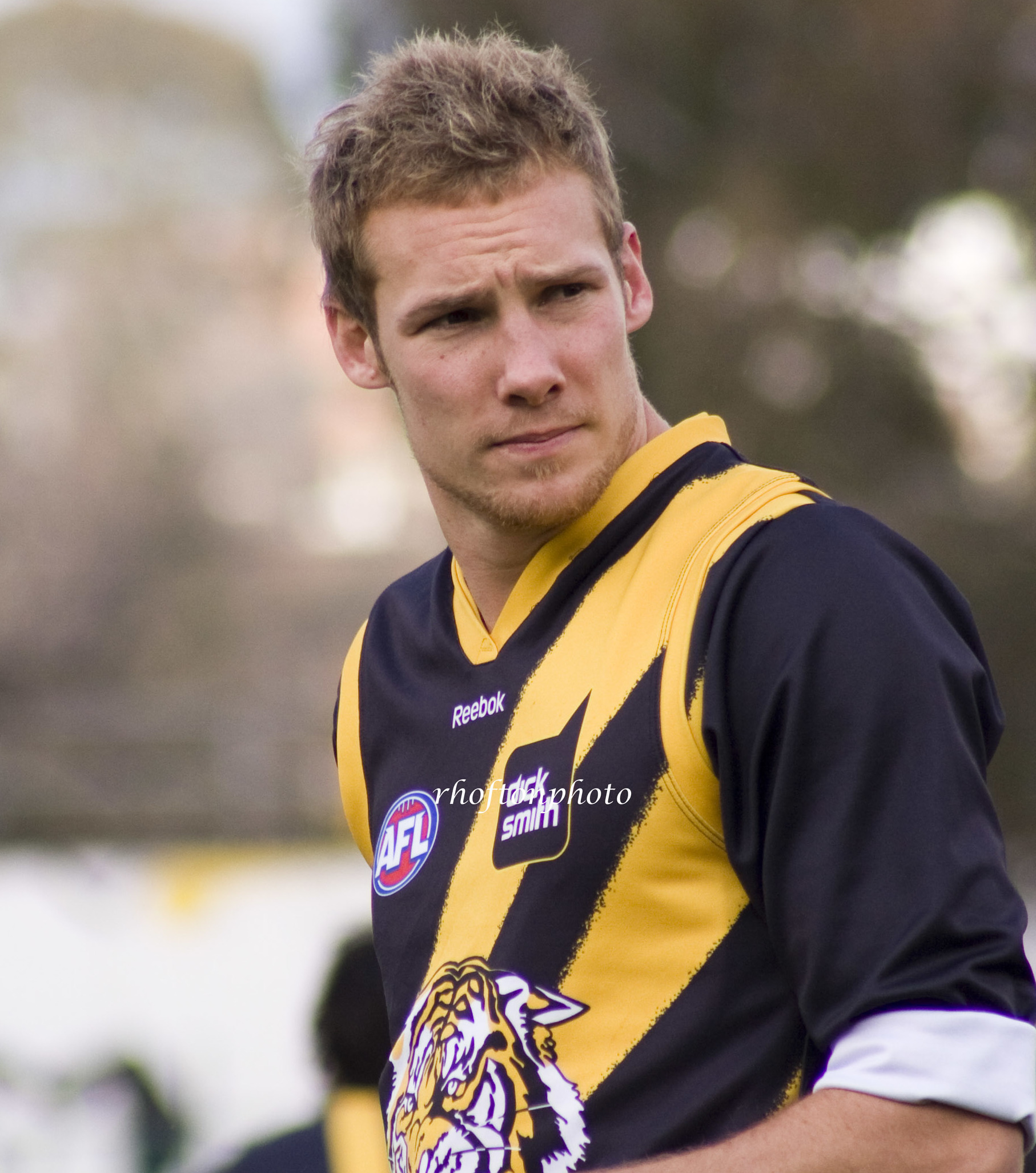
- McGuane in August 2009

Personal information
- Full name: Luke McGuane
- Born: 12 February 1987 (age 39); Gold Coast, Queensland, Australia
- Original team: Broadbeach (QAFL)
- Draft: 36th overall, 2004; Richmond
- Height: 192 cm (6 ft 4 in)
- Weight: 90 kg (198 lb)
- Position: Key Defender/Forward

Playing career^{1}
Years	Club	Games (Goals)
2005–2013	Richmond	105 (39)
2014–2015	Brisbane Lions	7 (7)
Total		112 (46)
- ^{1} Playing statistics correct to the end of 2015.

Luke McGuane (born 12 February 1987) is a former professional Australian rules footballer who played for the Richmond Football Club and Brisbane Lions in the Australian Football League (AFL).

McGuane is a key position player. He was drafted by Richmond with pick 36 in the 2004 national draft. He was recruited from Broadbeach in the (AFL Queensland State League).

In a VFL game in 2007, playing for Coburg, he was struck by a falling goalpost in a bizarre incident.

McGuane is the cousin of dual Collingwood best and fairest winner Mick McGuane.

At the end of the 2013 season, he was delisted by Richmond. He then signalled an intention to return to Queensland under former Richmond assistant coach, Justin Leppitsch at the Brisbane Lions. On 4 November 2013, the Brisbane Lions signed McGuane as a delisted free agent.

He announced his immediate retirement from the AFL in September 2015, citing a knee injury.

== Statistics ==
Legend
G	Goals	K	Kicks	D	Disposals	T	Tackles
B	Behinds	H	Handballs	M	Marks

Season	Team	No.	Games	Totals							Averages (per game)						
Season	Team	No.	Games	G	B	K	H	D	M	T	G	B	K	H	D	M	T
2005	Richmond	38	0	—	—	—	—	—	—	—	—	—	—	—	—	—	—
2006	Richmond	38	2	0	1	5	4	9	4	0	0.0	0.5	2.5	2.0	4.5	2.0	0.0
2007	Richmond	38	14	0	0	89	69	158	53	31	0.0	0.0	6.4	4.9	11.3	3.8	2.2
2008	Richmond	16	16	0	0	105	80	185	81	38	0.0	0.0	6.6	5.0	11.6	5.1	2.4
2009	Richmond	16	22	2	3	144	151	295	127	37	0.1	0.1	6.6	6.9	13.4	5.8	1.7
2010	Richmond	16	16	2	2	84	113	197	62	34	0.1	0.1	5.3	7.1	12.3	3.9	2.1
2011	Richmond	16	14	0	0	66	106	172	49	34	0.0	0.0	4.8	7.6	12.3	3.5	2.1
2012	Richmond	16	9	15	10	53	43	96	31	31	1.7	1.1	5.9	4.8	10.7	3.4	3.4
2013	Richmond	16	12	20	10	83	45	128	45	25	1.7	0.8	6.9	3.8	10.7	3.8	2.1
2014	Brisbane Lions	1	3	0	1	7	9	16	4	1	0.0	0.3	2.3	3.0	5.3	1.3	0.3
2015	Brisbane Lions	1	4	7	4	25	20	45	14	7	1.8	1.0	6.3	5.0	11.3	3.5	1.8
Career			112	46	31	661	640	1301	470	238	0.4	0.3	5.9	5.7	4.2	11.6	2.1
