= Daniel Jackson (footballer) =

Australian rules footballer (born 1986)

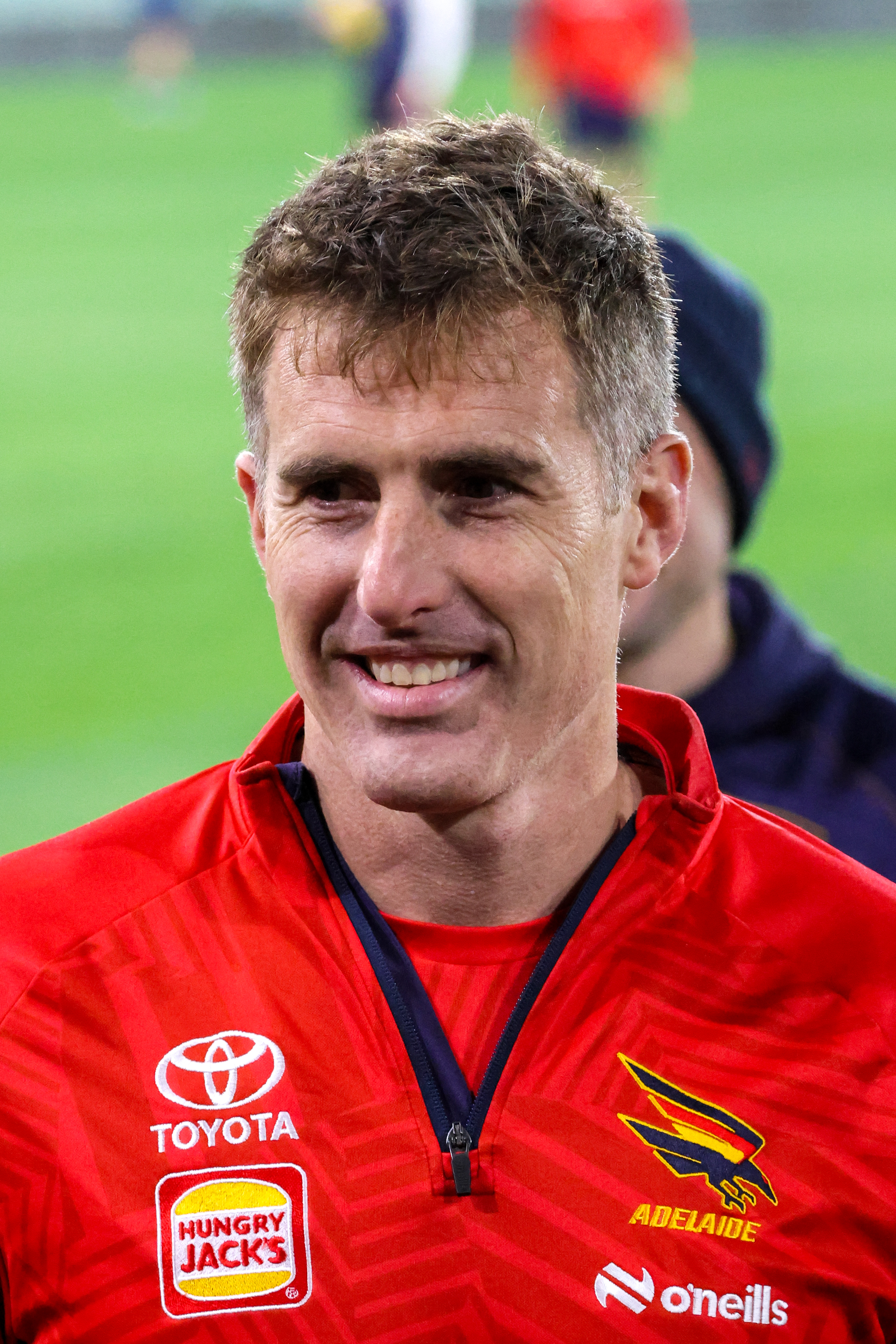
- Jackson with Adelaide in 2026

Personal information
- Born: 25 April 1986 (age 40)
- Original teams: Carey Grammar (APS); Oakleigh Chargers (TAC Cup)
- Draft: No. 53, 2003 national draft
- Height: 188 cm (6 ft 2 in)
- Weight: 92 kg (203 lb)
- Position: Midfielder

Playing career^{1}
Years	Club	Games (Goals)
2004–2014	Richmond	156 (61)
- ^{1} Playing statistics correct to the end of 2014.

Career highlights
- Inaugural Jim Stynes Community Leadership Award: 2012; Jack Dyer Medal: 2013

Daniel Jackson (born 25 April 1986) is a former Australian rules footballer who played for the Richmond Football Club in the Australian Football League (AFL).

Originally from Carey Grammar, Jackson was drafted to Richmond from the Oakleigh Chargers in the TAC Cup with the 53rd selection in the 2003 AFL draft. He went on to play 156 games for the Tigers, predominantly as a midfielder and lockdown player, and was a member of the club's leadership group from 2009 to 2014.

In 2013, Jackson won the Jack Dyer Medal, making him the oldest player to win the club's Best and Fairest for the first time since Matthew Richardson in 2007. He also won the club's Jack Titus Medal for runner-up Best and Fairest in 2009.

Jackson was awarded the inaugural Jim Stynes Community Leadership Award in 2012 for his work with a number of community programs. Jackson was also an active delegate and board member of the AFL Players Association throughout his career.

On 5 September 2014, Jackson announced his immediate retirement from AFL football, citing the toll injuries had taken on his body.

Continuing with his passion of helping people and community work, Jackson has created Foundation Performance to maximise individual performance capabilities. He also travelled and volunteered in Nepal with THISWORLDEXISTS, an Australian nonprofit to hike to Everest Base Camp and support educational improvements in Nepalese communities.

Jackson achieved an ENTER score of 96.65, and has completed Commerce studies at the University of Melbourne.

== Statistics ==
Legend
G	Goals	K	Kicks	D	Disposals	T	Tackles
B	Behinds	H	Handballs	M	Marks

Season	Team	No.	Games	Totals							Averages (per game)						
Season	Team	No.	Games	G	B	K	H	D	M	T	G	B	K	H	D	M	T
2004	Richmond	23	6	0	0	31	21	62	9	21	0.0	0.0	5.2	3.5	10.3	1.5	3.5
2005	Richmond	23	10	0	2	43	31	74	21	11	0.0	0.2	4.3	3.1	7.4	2.1	1.1
2006	Richmond	23	5	4	3	20	12	32	19	5	0.8	0.6	4.0	2.4	6.4	3.8	1.0
2007	Richmond	23	15	7	6	129	81	210	79	22	0.5	0.4	8.6	5.4	14.0	5.3	4.4
2008	Richmond	23	11	4	2	105	88	193	49	38	0.4	0.2	9.6	8.0	17.6	4.5	3.5
2009	Richmond	23	22	4	7	286	221	507	107	107	0.2	0.3	13.0	10.0	23.0	4.9	4.9
2010	Richmond	23	14	3	5	161	149	310	41	83	0.2	0.3	11.5	10.6	22.1	2.9	5.9
2011	Richmond	23	21	7	20	236	171	407	58	105	0.3	1.0	11.2	8.1	19.2	2.8	5.0
2012	Richmond	23	19	10	13	197	158	355	74	66	0.5	0.7	10.4	8.3	18.7	3.9	3.5
2013	Richmond	23	23	18	9	316	197	513	100	90	0.8	0.4	13.7	8.6	23.3	4.4	3.9
2014	Richmond	23	10	4	4	119	100	219	35	43	0.4	0.4	11.9	10.0	21.9	3.5	4.3
Career			156	61	71	1643	1229	2872	592	591	0.4	0.5	10.5	7.9	18.4	3.8	3.8
