= Mark Lee (Australian rules footballer) =

Australian rules footballer

Personal information
- Born: 29 March 1959 (age 67); Mildura, Victoria
- Original team: Mildura
- Debut: 1977, Richmond vs. Essendon, at MCG
- Height: 199 cm (6 ft 6 in)
- Weight: 96 kg (212 lb)

Playing career^{1}
Years	Club	Games (Goals)
1977–1991	Richmond	233 (94)
- ^{1} Playing statistics correct to the end of 1991.

Career highlights
- VFL debut with Richmond on 30 July 1977 v Essendon at MCG; Richmond Premiership Player 1980; Richmond Captain 1985–1986; Richmond Best & Fairest 1984; 6 State games for Victoria; All Australian 1980, 1983, 1985

Mark Lee (born 29 March 1959 in Mildura, Victoria), father to Alice Springs Netball great Tahlia Lee, is known affectionately as "The General" and is a former Australian rules football player for the Richmond Football Club. Recruited from Richmond's country zone in Mildura, Lee played a couple of games in 1977 but took off the following year as the team's regular ruckman, allowing David Cloke to become a centre-half-forward and solving a problem the team had had since the loss of Michael Green and Brian Roberts a few years beforehand. He remained static in 1979, but the following year Lee moved into the elite of Australian Rules as his ability as a knock ruckman combined with the running power of fellow Mildura recruit Dale Weightman, Robert Wiley, Geoff Raines and Bryan Wood to give one of the most potent forward lines in Australian Rules history an abundance of ball.

The Tigers won eleven successive matches early in the 1980 VFL season and, after a slump as injuries took toll late on the home-and-away rounds, returned to their most devastating form in the finals. They easily beat Carlton in the Qualifying Final, withstood a powerful Geelong defence in the Second Semi, and set a record winning margin against a jaded Collingwood side in the Grand Final. Although Kevin Bartlett unanimously won the Norm Smith Medal, Lee's form in annihilating reigning Brownlow Medallist Peter Moore in the ruck was widely praised and Lee was seen as a "superstar" for the 1980s.

However, as it turned out Lee never lived up to what was expected of him during the 1980s. 1981 was a mediocre season, and 1982 began with Lee hit by a succession of injuries. He broke his wrist in a practice match and did not play until the eighth round, then hamstring trouble kept him idle after one match until the thirteenth round. When Lee did return for good, Michael Roach had been so successful in the ruck that Lee was used initially at full forward; but though he kicked nine goals against St Kilda in Round 17 that experiment did not last. In the 1982 VFL Grand Final against Carlton Lee's nullification by Warren "Wow" Jones was a decisive factor in Richmond's loss.

1983 and 1984 saw Lee back to his 1980 form as unchallenged Number One ruckman for the Tigers, in spite of the club declining to near the bottom of the ladder with only seven wins in 1983 and ten in 1984. Lee was regarded as a leading candidate for the Brownlow in both seasons and in 1984 won his club's best-and-fairest by a record margin, in the process being listed as one of the VFL "Players of the Year". However, 1985 saw a succession of major injuries begin to decimate the remainder of Mark Lee's career: he missed the second half of 1985 with medial ligament damage to his left knee and from 1986 to 1991 played just eighty-seven senior games. After two games in 1991, Lee was dropped to the reserves and he retired officially mid-season. Lee then switched to Burnie Tigers in Tasmania as captain-coach for two seasons in 1992 and 1993 and continued as non-playing coach for one more year after merging with Burnie Hawks.

He is now a Senior Constable within Victoria Police and is currently based in his home town of Mildura.
