= John Sheahan (footballer) =

Australian rules footballer

Personal information
- Full name: John Sheahan
- Born: 19 September 1942
- Original team: East Ballarat
- Height: 184 cm (6 ft 0 in)
- Weight: 76 kg (168 lb)

Playing career^{1}
Years	Club	Games (Goals)
1962, 1965–66	Richmond	17 (11)
- ^{1} Playing statistics correct to the end of 1966.

John Sheahan (born 19 September 1942) is a former Australian rules footballer who played with Richmond in the Victorian Football League (VFL).

== Family ==
The son of Richmond footballer, Maurie Sheahan.

== Football ==
He represented the VFA in 1964.
