= Ray Dunn =

Raymond Hudson Dunn (21 June 1910 – 26 August 1971) was a noted lawyer and football administrator with VFL club Richmond. Ray Dunn was one of the towering figures at Richmond who laid the foundations for the club's greatest era of success. An immensely successful defence lawyer who won many significant cases, Dunn devoted much of his spare time and energy to the Tigers over a period of almost forty years.

== The son of a cop ==
Born at Geelong, Victoria, he was the second son of Victorian-born parents, police constable Thomas Dunn (1884–1953) and his wife Mary Ellen (née Hudson). Tom Dunn had a distinguished police career after joining the force in 1906. Intelligent and efficient, he was transferred to Russell Street headquarters in 1924, and for the decade from 1927, he successively worked as a special adviser and assistant to (Sir) Thomas Blamey and to Alexander Duncan. Awarded the Royal Victorian medal in 1934, Tom Dunn retired as the state's second-ranking policeman in June 1944 after 34 years' service.

His son Ray was sent to schools in Geelong and Essendon, and attended the University of Melbourne on a scholarship. He received an LL.B. in 1930, an LL.M. two years later and in his final year was awarded the Supreme Court judges' prize. Dunn married Marie Ellen Whelan at St Teresa's Catholic Church, Essendon, in June 1934. Together, the couple had two daughters. They later divorced and Dunn remarried in Sydney during 1951. With his second wife, Kathleen Monica Patricia (née Foster-Wightman), Dunn had a son, Michael, but this marriage also ended in divorce.

== The Great Defender ==
Dunn was a distinctive figure around the magistrates' courts of Melbourne - he was balding, plump, wore glasses and had a memorable, gravelly voice. He chose to remain a solicitor and declined all inducements to become a barrister. Despite this decision, Dunn built a reputation as one of the outstanding defence lawyers of his time. A man of stunning mental agility, he defended clients against police prosecutions of any type and specialised in gaming legislation. In 1967, he forced the Victorian government to amend the Motor Car Act of 1958, when he secured an acquittal for a truck driver accused of exceeding the blood alcohol limit.

Throughout his life, Dunn was closely associated with the police force, both in and out of the courtroom. He lectured on prosecution and criminal law in courses at the Detective Training School and the Victoria Police College, and acted as legal counsel for the police many times. Engaged by the Victoria Police Association to defend members who had been counter-summonsed by people that they had arrested, Dunn only lost twice in more than eighty such cases during the mid-1960s. For more than a decade, he worked part-time as a lecturer in criminal procedure at Melbourne University as well as the new law school at Monash University and at the Royal Melbourne Institute of Technology's articled clerks' course. He was highly sought after as an after-dinner speaker.

== Long association with Richmond ==
However, it was Dunn's long service to the Richmond Football Club that brought him the most fame. He first became involved with the club in the 1930s through railwayman and Tiger player Martin Bolger. A vice-president from 1940, Dunn formed Richmond's first coterie group in 1963. The following year, he was elected president with the specific brief to negotiate the move of the club's home games to the Melbourne Cricket Ground for 1965. From there, Dunn oversaw an era of great success, underwritten by the extra finances gained from the move and the efforts of the coterie. Under his administration, the Tigers broke a 24-year premiership drought in 1967 and followed up with another triumph two years later. Unfortunately, Dunn's health then began to fail. He had battled diabetes since the early 1960s, and finally succumbed to a coronary occlusion on 26 August 1971 at his Metung holiday home. Survived by the three children of his two marriages, Dunn was buried in St Kilda Cemetery and his estate was sworn for probate at $239,264. Dunn was granted life membership at Richmond in 1946, and elected to the club's hall of fame in 2002.
