= Wheelchair Australian rules football =

Football played by people in wheelchairs

The first organised game of competitive wheelchair Australian rules football was played at the RAAF base in Adelaide, South Australia on 8 November 2015. The game involved a team of wounded Australian Defence Force (ADF) personnel undergoing rehabilitation at Darwin's soldier Recovery Centre and a Disability Sports Australia (DSA) team made up of players from South Australia. The game was organized by the ADF, Australian Football League and DSA. The final score was: DSA team 16.8.104 defeated the ADF team 14.5.89.

In April 2015, Prince Harry whilst visiting Darwin, Northern Territory raised the profile of this new sport by participating in a game of wheelchair AFL. The game involved wounded Australian soldiers.

In November 2015, there were plans to create a national league.

== Rules ==
Rules of the game have some similarity to AFL rules for Australian rules football and include:

- Game is started by throwing up the ball in the centre of the field.
- Six points for a goal, and one point for a behind.
- Kicks are replaced with handballs, and handballs replaced with underarm throws.
- A red Sherrin football is used, with the game split into four quarters.
- Game is played on a basketball court with plastic posts at each end of the court.
- Only five players from each team can be on the field at any given time.
- Team is divided in backs, centres and forwards but only forwards can score.

== Leagues ==
Every state in Australia provides access to play wheelchair Australian rules football. Select states have organised leagues where clubs compete.

List of State Leagues:

- Queensland Wheelchair Football League
- Victorian Wheelchair Football League
- WA Wheelchair Football League
- Northern Territory Wheelchair Football League
- South Australian Wheelchair Football League
- NSW/ACT Wheelchair Football League

== See also ==
- Wheelchair sports
- Wheelchair rugby
- Wheelchair rugby league
