= Maurie Sheahan =

Australian rules footballer

Personal information
- Full name: Maurice Edward Sheahan
- Born: 24 December 1905; Narraport, Victoria
- Died: 17 September 1956 (aged 50); Ballarat, Victoria
- Original team: St Patrick's College/Narraport/South Ballarat
- Height: 180 cm (5 ft 11 in)
- Weight: 90.5 kg (200 lb)
- Position: Full back

Playing career^{1}
Years	Club	Games (Goals)
1929–1936	Richmond	121 (3)
- ^{1} Playing statistics correct to the end of 1936.

Career highlights
- Richmond Premiership Player 1932, 1934

Maurice Edward Sheahan (24 December 1905 – 17 September 1956) was an Australian rules footballer who played in the VFL between 1929 and 1936 for the Richmond Football Club.

== Family ==
His son, John Sheahan (b.1942), played seventeen games for Richmond in the early and mid-1960s.

== Football ==
Originally from Ballarat, Sheahan was already twenty-three when he joined the Tigers, but his hard and tough defensive play transformed a team renowned for its attacking power in the 1920s into a rock-like defensive unit that defied the powerful attacks of Collingwood and later South Melbourne to make the Grand Final every year from 1931 to 1934 and have the meanest defence every year from 1932 to 1935.

Sheahan was a member of Richmond's legendary "Three Musketeers" backline of Bolger, Sheahan and O'Neill. He played in the premiership teams of 1932 and 1934 as well as the losing Grand Final sides of 1929 and 1933.

In an incident that was remembered for decades after it occurred, Sheahan was famously penalised for time-wasting in the dying minutes of the close top-of-the-ladder South Melbourne–Richmond match in Round 8, 1933 after setting up to kick in after a behind with a place kick – despite the fact that time was off until the kick-in was executed. South Melbourne's subsequent goal narrowed the deficit to five points, but the final bell sounded soon afterwards and Richmond still won the game.

Injuries, however, affected Sheahan's career quite badly: he was kept out of seven games early in the 1931 season by a broken arm and weight problems caused Sheahan to lose form so badly that he was actually omitted from the club's two 1931 finals. He recovered well until 1936, when Richmond omitted Sheahan for the third game upon his announcement he would not play against Carlton in the fourth round due to his marriage. Sheahan never recovered his form and retired at the end of the season, but was awarded Life Membership of the Richmond Football Club in 1938 and went on to serve as the club secretary in 1939.

== Death ==
Sheahan died at Ballarat, Victoria, on 17 September 1956.
