= Maurie Fleming =

Richmond Football Club administrator

James Maurice "Maurie" Fleming MBE (1902 – 6 October 1980) was a long time administrator of the Richmond Football Club in Victoria, Australia.

He served as club secretary from 1940 until 1954 and then as president from 1958 to 1963.

Fleming was made a life member of the Richmond Football Club in 1942 and was awarded an MBE in 1959 "in recognition of service to charities in Victoria."

The Maurie Fleming Medal was awarded each season to the player who finishes third in the Richmond Football Club's best and fairest count.
