= Allan Cooke =

Australian rules footballer

Personal information
- Born: 9 April 1930
- Died: 12 May 2010 (aged 80)
- Original team: Mitcham Juniors
- Height: 185 cm (6 ft 1 in)
- Weight: 84.5 kg (186 lb)

Playing career^{1}
Years	Club	Games (Goals)
1949–1958	Richmond	116 (54)
- ^{1} Playing statistics correct to the end of 1958.

Career highlights
- Richmond - Hall of Fame - inducted 2006

Allan Cooke (9 April 1930 – 12 May 2010) was an Australian rules football player who played in the Victorian Football League (VFL) between 1949 and 1958 for the Richmond Football Club. He was also a long time Committee member of the club.

He was made a life member of Richmond in 1958 and was inducted into the club's Hall of Fame in 2006.
