= Kevin O'Neill (Australian footballer) =

Australian rules footballer

Edward Kevin O'Neill

Personal information
- Full name: Edward Kevin O'Neill
- Born: 20 March 1908; Echuca, Victoria
- Died: 12 July 1985 (aged 77); Echuca, Victoria
- Original teams: Echuca/St Mary's, (Echuca)
- Height: 175 cm (5 ft 9 in)
- Weight: 79 kg (174 lb)

Playing career^{1}
Years	Club	Games (Goals)
1930–1941	Richmond	209 (12)
- ^{1} Playing statistics correct to the end of 1941.

Career highlights
- Richmond Premiership Player 1932, 1934; Interstate Games:- 10; Richmond - Hall of Fame - inducted 2008

Edward Kevin O'Neill (20 March 1908 – 12 July 1985) was an Australian rules footballer who played in the VFL between 1930 and 1941 for the Richmond Football Club.

The son of a former Richmond player from its days in the VFA, O'Neill was a member of the Tigers' legendary "Three Musketeers" backline of Bolger, Sheahan and O'Neill. He played in four straight senior Grand Finals from 1931 to 1934, winning the premiership in 1932 and 1934. He also played in Richmond's losing Grand Final side of 1940.

O'Neill represented Victoria on ten occasions, as State vice-captain for an Interstate Carnival, and was awarded Life Membership of the Richmond Football Club in 1939.

During the Second World War he served in the RAAF.

He returned to the Tigers briefly in 1944 as Captain/Coach of the Seconds side.
