= Charlie Callander =

Australian rules football administrator

Charlie Callander was a long time Property Steward and Committee member of the Richmond Football Club.

He served as Richmond's Property Steward/Consultant for sixty-three seasons, from 1924 until 1986. During this time he also acted as the VFL Property Steward from 1946 to 1964 and served on the Richmond Football Club Committee from 1945 to 1974. He was Patron of Richmond from 1975 until 1986.

He was made a life member of the Richmond Football Club in 1941 and was inducted into the club's Hall of Fame in its inaugural year, 2002.
