= Richmond Football Club =

Australian rules football club

Names
- Full name: Richmond Football Club Limited
- Nickname(s): Tigers, Tiges

2026 season
- After finals: DNQ
- Home-and-away season: 17th
- Leading goalkicker: Mykelti Lefau (23 goals)
- Jack Dyer Medal: Tim Taranto

Club details
- Founded: 1885; 141 years ago
- Colours: Black Yellow
- Competition: AFL: Senior men AFLW: Senior women VFL: Reserves men VWFL: Wheelchair (mixed)
- President: John O'Rourke
- CEO: Shane Dunne
- Coach: AFL: Adem Yze; AFLW: Jarrad Donders; VFL: Jack Madgen
- Captain(s): AFL: Toby Nankervis; AFLW: Gabby Seymour & Ellie McKenzie; VFL: Lachlan Street
- Premierships: VFL/AFL (13): 1920; 1921; 1932; 1934; 1943; 1967; 1969; 1973; 1974; 1980; 2017; 2019; 2020; VFA (2): 1902; 1905; McClelland Trophy (8): 1967; 1972; 1973; 1974; 1975; 1977; 1982; 2018; Championship of Australia (3): 1969; 1973; 1974; Reserves/VFL (10): 1929; 1946; 1954; 1955; 1966; 1971; 1973; 1977; 1997; 2019; Thirds/Under-19s (11): 1958; 1967; 1968; 1969; 1970; 1973; 1975; 1977; 1980; 1985; 1989; VWFL (3): 2019; 2022; 2024; VWFL Reserves/Development (1): 2022
- Ground: AFL: Melbourne Cricket Ground (100,024); Ninja Stadium (20,000); AFLW/VFL: Punt Road Oval (2,800)
- Training ground: Punt Road Oval

Uniforms
Home	Away	Clash

Other information
- Official website: richmondfc.com.au

The Richmond Football Club, nicknamed the Tigers or colloquially the Tiges, is a professional Australian rules football team competing in the Australian Football League (AFL). Founded in 1885 in the Melbourne suburb of Richmond, the club competed in the Victorian Football Association (VFA) from 1885 to 1907, winning two premierships. Richmond then joined the Victorian Football League (now known as the AFL) from the 1908 season and has since won 13 premierships, most recently in 2020.

From 1885 to 1964, Richmond's home ground was the Punt Road Oval, (formerly named Richmond Cricket Ground), which is still utilised as their headquarters, training facility and hosting AFL Women's (AFLW) and reserves matches. Since the 1965 season, the Melbourne Cricket Ground (MCG) has been the club's official home ground.

Richmond traditionally wears a black guernsey with a yellow sash. The club song, "We're From Tigerland", is well known for its "yellow and black" refrain.

The club is coached by former Melbourne assistant coach Adem Yze, and is captained by Toby Nankervis. Five Richmond players have been inducted into the Australian Football Hall of Fame as "Legends" of the sport: Kevin Bartlett, Jack Dyer, Royce Hart, Kevin Sheedy and Ian Stewart.

== History ==
=== Origins and VFA years (1885–1907) ===
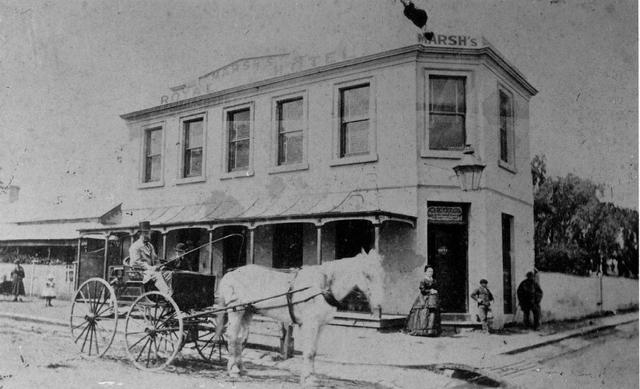
The Richmond Football Club was formed at a meeting at the Royal Hotel in Richmond in 1885

A short-lived football club named Richmond formed in 1860 with Tom Wills, one of the founders of Australian rules football, serving as its inaugural secretary and captain. Wills' cousin H. C. A. Harrison captained Richmond briefly in the early 1860s before moving to Geelong. This club was disbanded in 1871 and has no continuity to the present club. A number of teams formed in Richmond during the game's rapid expansion in the 1870s and early 1880s. However, all played at a junior level and it was considered an anomaly that Richmond, one of Melbourne's most prominent suburbs, did not boast a senior side. The wait ended when the Richmond Football Club was officially formed at the Royal Hotel in Richmond on 20 February 1885. A successful application for immediate admission to the Victorian Football Association (VFA) followed. The club shared the Punt Road Oval with the Richmond Cricket Club, one of the strongest cricket clubs in Australia which had been playing on the ground since 1856.

At first the team wore blue guernseys and caps with yellow and black stripes in the style of the Richmond Cricket Club. The football club soon adopted yellow and black as its official colours. From the 1890s the supporters and players were often referred to as "Richmondites" and, according to The Age in 1890, The Leader in 1899 and former club secretary William Maybury the team were occasionally called "Wasps." The moniker by which they are now known, the "Tigers", was first adopted around 1908–10 period through the newspapers Punch and The Richmond Guardian.

During the late 1880s, Richmond struggled to make an impression in the VFA, and after a promising season in 1888 (when they finished fifth with eleven wins), the club slipped backwards, in the process losing players to more successful sides. As the local economy slipped into severe depression in the early 1890s and the crowds began to dwindle, some of the VFA's strongest clubs began to agitate for a reform of the competition. Richmond was not considered part of this elite group, which usually voted as a bloc at VFA meetings.

In 1896, Richmond walked off the field in a match against South Melbourne to protest the umpiring, and later in the season, the Tigers had their half-time score annulled against Essendon when it was discovered that they had too many men on the ground. In the closing three weeks of the season, Richmond's cut of the gate takings amounted to just five pounds, and they finished the season with the wooden spoon.

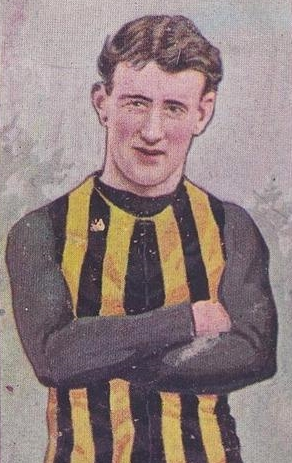
Alec Edmond captained Richmond from 1901 to his retirement in 1907

In October 1896, the cabal of six strong clubs broke with the association to form the Victorian Football League (VFL). As a struggling club with a poor following, Richmond was not invited to join the new league. Richmond's performances did not immediately improve in the depleted VFA until the turn of the century.

The Tigers were boosted by a significant country recruit in 1901. George "Mallee" Johnson was an instant sensation and the first true star player at the club. Richmond leapt to third place and then in 1902, with Johnson dominating the ruck, Richmond entered the closing weeks of the season neck and neck with Port Melbourne at the head of the ladder, but Port Melbourne faltered against Williamstown to hand Richmond its first flag. Having missed a potential bonanza from a premiership play-off, the VFA decided to emulate the VFL and introduce a finals series in 1903, a fateful decision for the Tigers. After recruiting the competition's leading goalkicker, Jack Hutchinson, and finishing the season as minor premier, Richmond lost both finals and were runner-up.

The following season, the club became embroiled in a feud with umpire Allen, whom the Tigers accused of failing to curb field invasions and, in particular, the dubious tactics of arch-rival North Melbourne. In the 10 September 1904 match, during which a significant number of Richmond players sustained serious gashes, and despite the earnest requests of the Richmond players, field umpire Allen refused to exercise his legitimate, official power to check the boots of the North Melbourne players for "spikes" on the soles of their boots. When the two clubs were scheduled to meet in the 1904 VFA Grand Final, Richmond announced that they wouldn't play with Allen as umpire. The VFA called Richmond's bluff, and appointed Allen as umpire for the match, meaning that the Grand Final was scratched and North Melbourne won the premiership on forfeit.

Richmond were now openly at odds with the VFA, and matters failed to improve in the next few years. The club was campaigning against violence (both on-field and among the crowd), ungentlemanly conduct and poor sportsmanship, issues that plagued the VFA to a far greater extent than the rival VFL since the 1896 split. Richmond cultivated links with some VFL clubs by playing practice matches against them. Richmond knew that they were a major asset to the VFA, had built up a large following and played on one of the best grounds in the competition, where they remained unbeaten for five years. In 1905, Richmond confirmed their status with a second premiership, this time overcoming bitter rivals North Melbourne, "Mallee" Johnson had moved to Carlton, but youngster Charlie Ricketts dominated the season and won plaudits among the pressmen, who voted him the best player in the VFA.

However, Ricketts was also lost to the VFL and injury hit the club hard. In 1906–07, the Tigers played finals without looking likely to win the flag. The club earned a rebuke from the VFA for scheduling a practice match against Geelong before the 1907 season, then went ahead with the commitment and earned further censure. Later in the year it became clear that the VFL wanted to expand its competition and Richmond won a place ahead of North Melbourne, which had been strengthened by an amalgamation with the bankrupt West Melbourne as part of their bid. Richmond were granted admission to the VFL on 18 October 1907.

=== Entry into the VFL (1908–1944) ===
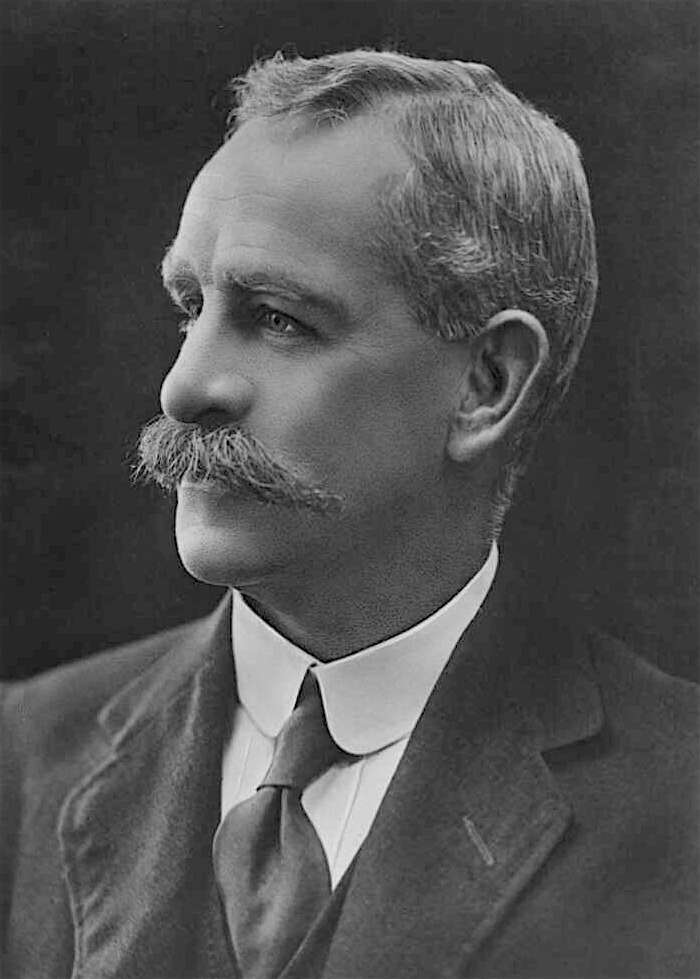
The Hon. Frank Tudor, federal leader of the ALP, was president of Richmond during World War I

The first few seasons in the VFL were less than spectacular. Although the club turned up some star players, it let a lot of talent leave and the administration was unstable after George Bennett's death at the end of the 1908 season. In 1916, the side won its first wooden spoon while also playing in the finals for the first time – World War I having reduced the competition to just four clubs, finals qualification was automatic.

Finally, in 1919, Richmond made their first Grand Final appearance, losing to Collingwood. Richmond stoked a rivalry with Collingwood by recruiting their former skipper Dan Minogue as playing coach and gained vengeance by beating Collingwood in the 1920 VFL Grand Final to secure a first flag in the big league. This was followed by an even better performance the next year. The only club that continued to beat Richmond on a regular basis was Carlton. Finishing minor premier with only one loss for the season in 1921, Carlton were the hottest premiership favourite, yet Richmond managed to beat them in two classic finals matches played over successive weeks to go back-to-back.

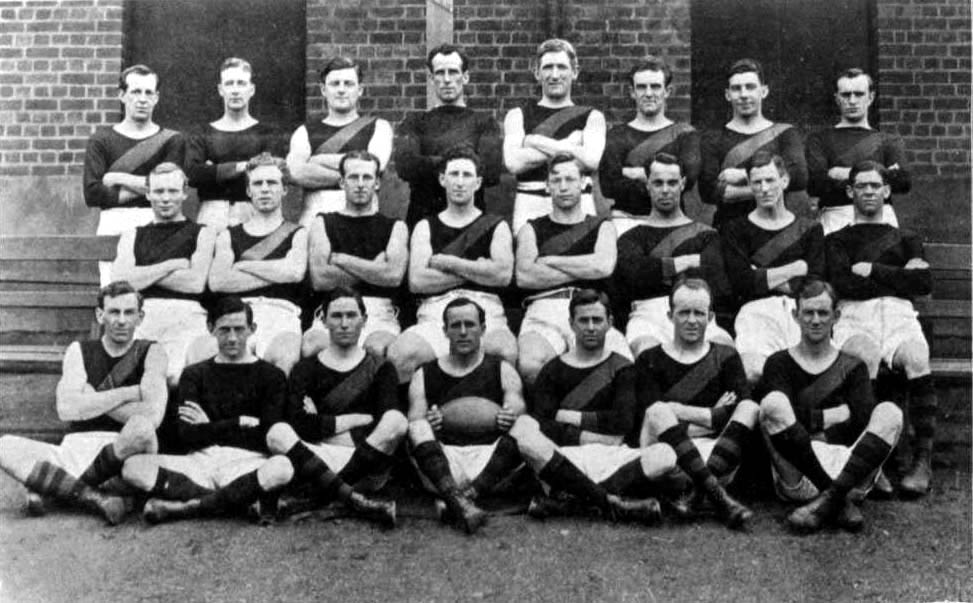
Richmond team that won its first VFL premiership in 1920

The rest of the decade saw four more Grand Final appearances, all of which would end in frustration. From 1927 to 1929 Richmond became the first club in the VFL to lose three consecutive Grand Finals, all of which were to neighbouring archrivals, Collingwood.

Chart of yearly ladder positions for Richmond in VFL/AFL

The next VFL flag came in 1932, with Richmond's triumph over Carlton in a tough encounter which saw Richmond wingman Allan Geddes play the second half with a broken jaw. Another premiership came in 1934, this time against South Melbourne's famed "Foreign Legion", avenging Richmond's loss in the 1933 VFL Grand Final.

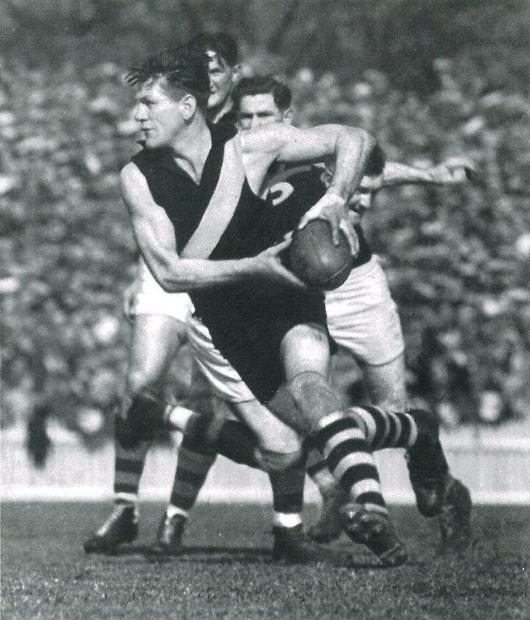
Richmond legend Jack Dyer played 19 consecutive seasons for the club, scoring 443 goals

Prior to the commencement of the 1940 season, internal problems were brewing between the key personalities at the club. Some felt that the uneven performance of the team was due to Percy Bentley's coaching methods, and that he should be replaced. Jack Dyer walked out on the club and threatened to play in the VFA after his father, a committeeman who was involved with the anti-Bentley faction, lost his position at the board elections. Finally, the matter was resolved and Bentley kept his job, while Dyer returned to training on the eve of the season. The problems appeared to have been solved when Richmond won the semi-final against Melbourne to go straight into the 1940 VFL Grand Final. However, Melbourne reversed this result with a crushing win to pinch the premiership. Richmond had been out-thought by their old mentor Frank 'Checker' Hughes, who had assigned a tagger to negate Dyer. Dyer was furious that Bentley had done nothing to prevent his opponent taking him out of the game. The Richmond committee agreed with this assessment, so when Bentley (after retiring as a player) attempted to negotiate a higher fee to continue his coaching tenure, he was rebuffed. Incensed, Bentley quit Punt Road and moved to Carlton as coach, adding further spice to an already fierce rivalry between the two clubs.

Despite the tribulations created by the Second World War, Richmond was able to maintain a commendable level of consistency on the field. The club had quite a lot of players in reserved occupations who remained at home, while the administration became adept at securing star players who were temporarily in Melbourne on war service. Dyer was a fearsome presence in his role as playing coach, but he was unable to improve Richmond's ability to win finals matches. A loss in the 1942 VFL Grand Final to Essendon (after starting as favourite) meant that over the previous 18 years, Richmond had won two flags but been runner-up eight times. Jack Titus set a still unbeaten record of playing in six losing Grand Final teams. In 1943, Richmond broke through to beat Essendon in a thrilling Grand Final by five points, a win that the club dedicated to ex-player Bill Cosgrove, an RAF pilot who had been killed in action a few weeks before the match. But another Grand Final loss followed in 1944, when Dyer's team failed against Fitzroy on a very hot day.

=== Tough times at Tigerland (1945–1965) ===
In the immediate post-war era, despite an influx of excellent new players, Richmond struggled to make the four, appearing in the finals only once, in 1947. Dyer continued on as coach for three years after his playing retirement at the end of 1949, but was asked to retire by the committee who felt the club needed a shake up. Under a succession of coaches in the 1950s, With the demands of potential players increasing with each passing year, the club refused to allocate sufficient funds to recruit and they failed to replace star players as they retired. When stalwarts such as Des Rowe and dual-Brownlow Medallist Roy Wright left, the team slumped dramatically and finished with a wooden spoon in 1960.

In 1962 Graeme Richmond was appointed Secretary of the club, Richmond was the under 19's coach who had been around the club since the early 1950s as a junior player until knee injury stopped him from playing so he took on coaching. Graeme understood that for Richmond to improve so would the recruiting. A shrewd businessman, Richmond was able to sign young recruits for bargain like fees. Royce Hart was given a suit and six shirts, and Kevin Bartlett simply walked in off the street. Graeme kept a close eye on the success former player Tom Hafey was having with Shepparton in the Goulburn Valley Football League. When coach Len Smith had a heart attack in 1965, the club appointed Jack Titus to serve as interim coach until a replacement could be found. Hafey was encouraged to apply, and the decision came down to Hafey and former club captain Ron Branton. Many expected Branton to get the job. However, Graeme Richmond saw something special in Hafey and he was appointed coach for the 1966 season.

=== Success through Hafey Era (1966–1982) ===
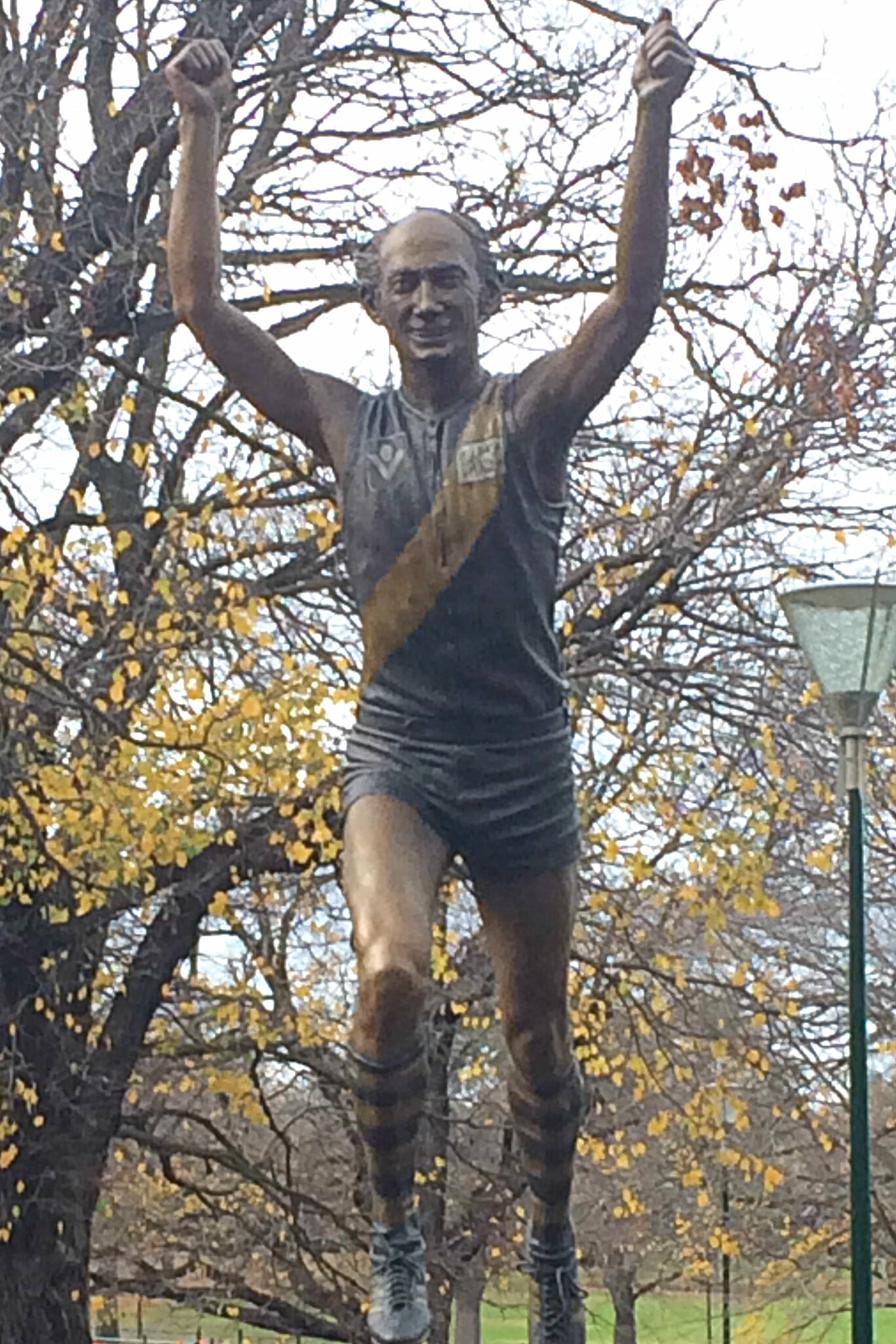
Statue of Kevin Bartlett outside the MCG

1966 heralded the start of the Tom Hafey era. Hafey, a former player of the club, was appointed coach and brought with him a couple of quality young footballers from northern Victoria. Out of the Goulburn Valley came Dick Clay from Kyabram and Francis Bourke from Nathalia. Further afield were Doug Strang and John Perry from Albury and Wodonga.

On his return to Richmond, Hafey found the team had acquired a number of young, high quality players, Kevin Bartlett was a skinny 17 year old who lived locally and had walked in and asked for a tryout. Mike Green followed Kevin a year later. Even so, he quickly put his stamp on the club, bringing intensity and desire to reach the top. Although he acknowledged the ideas and tactical approach of Len Smith (who remained at the club as a selector and consultant), Hafey opted for what became his trademark style: kick the ball long and quickly into the forward line. He raised the bar for fitness among his players,[4] extending pre-season training and introducing a third training night during the week. Richmond quickly became known for being the fittest team in the competition.

Richmond began 1966 strongly. A month before the finals, they hit the top of the ladder for the first time since 1951 and seemed certain to play in September. However, two losses dropped the Tigers to fifth place with thirteen wins and a draw. Richmond dismissed a number of players, replacing them with new players such as Royce Hart, Kevin Sheedy and Francis Bourke.

Richmond dominated the 1967 season, running out winners in a classic Grand Final against Geelong. In his first two years, the team lost only seven games and Hafey had gone from an unknown coach in the bush to the toast of the football world. In hindsight, the 1967 premiership marked a turning point for the game. The Tigers were fitter than any team that had gone before and were the highest scoring team since 1950. Australian football, after two decades of defensive-based play, was about to enter an era of high scoring, aided by rule changes, new tactics and better standards of fitness. They won the 1967 flag in a thrilling encounter with Geelong, ending a 24-year premiership drought.

The Tigers started the 1968 season slowly. They rallied to win the last six games, but missed the finals. When the Tigers were again lethargic in mid-1969, accusations of under-achievement arose and rumours that Hafey was on the way out circulated. The players rallied behind Hafey and finished the season strong, taking fourth place. The team won all three finals, beat the much fancied Carlton in the 1969 VFL Grand Final by 25 points.

After missing the playoffs in 1970, Hafey took the Tigers to the finals for the next five years. Basing the team's strategy around all-out attack had drawbacks. Richmond were dominant in 1972 and were hot favourites in the 1972 VFL Grand Final against Carlton. However, Carlton stunned Richmond in a game of ridiculous high scoring. Even Richmond equalled the then record highest score in a Grand Final of 22.18 (150), but Carlton beat it with 28.9 (177). Richmond got their revenge in an intensely physical clash in the 1973 VFL Grand Final and went back-to-back in 1974 with a strong win against a resurgent North Melbourne.

By now, the aggressive attitude of the club both on and off the field had created resentment toward the club. A number of incidents during the 1973 Grand Final – the Windy Hill brawl, the attempted recruitment of John Pitura from South Melbourne and a poor reaction to Kevin Bartlett's failure to win the Brownlow medal – all focussed negative attention on the club. Hafey, however, used the resentment to his advantage, telling his players "it's Richmond against the world".

Richmond showed signs of ageing in 1975, when they lost in the preliminary final. Triple Brownlow medallist, Ian Stewart retired, Paul Sproule returned to Hobart, Brian Roberts and two others were part of the John Pitura trade. A raft of other player departures made for a poor 1976 season, Hart spent most of the year nursing a knee and Dick Clay opted to retire. The Tigers finishing seventh, Hafey's worst ever result. Internally the Richmond board bickering had flared into the public domain. It took a majority vote for Hafey to be reappointed for 1977, but not unanimously (he had no contract with Richmond, instead being appointed on a year-to-year basis). When it leaked that Graeme Richmond, the club's powerbroker, had voted against Hafey's reappointment Hafey immediately resigned.

The club appointed dual premiership player Barry Richardson as coach for two seasons before he was replaced by Tony Jewell. Richmond won its next premiership under Jewell with a then record-breaking margin of 81 points over arch-rivals Collingwood in 1980. After reaching and losing the 1982 VFL Grand Final, it has been a rocky road for Richmond who have struggled to come to grips with the rules and regulations of a modernised VFL, including the draft and salary cap. The successes of the early 1980s were bought at high financial cost through expensive recruiting, and were followed by severe cut backs that saw several top players depart.

=== Recruiting war (1983–1986) ===
Still smarting from the loss of star players to Collingwood, Richmond set themselves for war with Collingwood in 1984 by signing three of their players: John Annear, Craig Stewart and Phil Walsh. Not only were there big contracts and transfer fees to pay, but the costs of an expensive court action as well.

Richmond also signed a number of mediocre players on big contracts, and the club's financial situation took a battering. With the team failing to improve, a challenge to the committee was brewing and Richmond's traditional political stability threatened. The rebel group, organised by long-time servant Bill Durham, convinced former player and coach Barry Richardson to be leader. An election in late 1984 failed to clarify the situation.

Ian Wilson held on to the presidency into the new year. When the one hundredth birthday of the club arrived in February 1985, there was too much dissension to mark the moment fittingly. Eventually, Wilson handed over to Richardson, who had selected his former premiership teammate Paul Sproule to return from Tasmania and take over the coaching position on a guaranteed contract.

As the season progressed with Richmond still struggling, Sproule came under pressure. Richardson guaranteed his position, but at the end of the year, the committee overruled Richardson and sacked Sproule. Incensed, Richardson walked out of Punt Road, which was in turmoil again. Desperately, Richmond turned back to Tony Jewell, who was appointed coach for a second time, the only man in the club's history to get a second go at the job. Jewell later commented on the destruction wrought on the club during his four-year absence: "the supporters were gone, the members were gone, the money was gone, ... a real shame."

With the competition set to expand, Richmond made a number of misguided moves in 1986. To fill the vacancy left by Richardson, Richmond wooed high-flying West Australian entrepreneur Alan Bond to become president. Bond came with an agenda to raise money for the club by listing on the stockmarket and relocating to Brisbane. When the latter plan was revealed in the media, a furious reaction from supporters and high-profile club personalities buried the proposal almost immediately. Early in 1987, Bond's tenure at the club ended in farce when he resigned without presiding over a single game. The off-field confusion was reflected in the players' performance as Richmond slumped to only its second wooden spoon in 70 years.

=== Save Our Skins and a return to the finals (1987–1995) ===
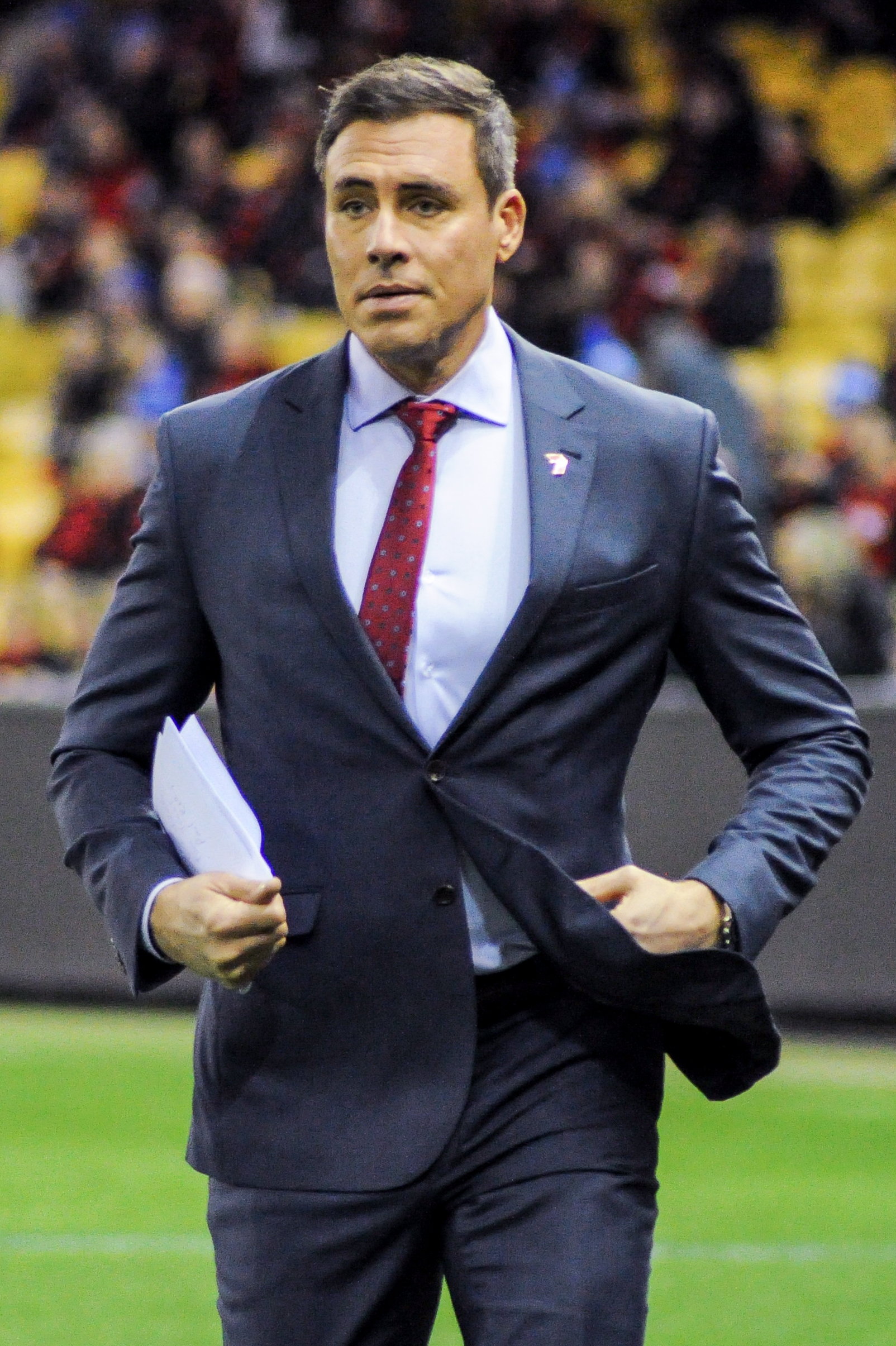
Debuting for Richmond in 1993, Matthew Richardson went on to become one of the league's leading goal kickers.

Although the new president, ex-captain Neville Crowe, had stabilised the club and scored a coup by persuading club legend Kevin Bartlett to coach, the club only managed to stay solvent by cutting expenses to the bone and paying only two-thirds of the allowable salary cap, meaning there was no money for recruiting to improve an impoverished playing list. The club struggled to come to terms with the draft after its inception in 1986, and made a number of poor choices—notably, 1987's number one draft pick, Richard Lounder, only managed four games at the club.

Finally, with the economy in serious recession and interest rates touching seventeen per cent, Richmond's creditors came knocking. At one point, an attempt was made to seize the club's 1973 and 1974 premiership trophies as securities for unpaid debts, an embarrassing situation. For a number of years, the exact amount that the club owed was not publicly known. After Bartlett came Allan Jeans, who then passed the job to ex-Richmond premiership player John Northey for 1993. Northey returned the team to the simple long-kicking style of the halcyon days under the legendary Tom Hafey. Along with some draft concessions granted by the AFL, Northey's efforts gradually improved Richmond. The team fumbled an opportunity to make the 1994 finals, then opened 1995 with its best start to a season in 75 years and eventually made it to the preliminary final. With a talented playing list and a strong administration led by Leon Daphne (Richmond's first president from the corporate world, the Alan Bond farce aside), Richmond looked set to become regular finalists again.

=== Lost opportunities (1996–2004) ===
The anticipated success failed to materialise, partly because Richmond allowed the coaching position to again become unstable. With over a year still to run on his contract, John Northey demanded a contract extension that the club refused. This was because of a rumour that some people with an association with the club were pursuing Essendon coach and former Richmond premiership player Kevin Sheedy. So Northey walked out on Richmond and accepted a longer-term contract to coach the Brisbane Bears. Richmond, caught short, appointed the Bears' ex-coach Robert Walls for 1996. After several humiliating thrashings in 1997, Robert Walls became the first Richmond coach to be sacked mid-season. After two-and-a-half seasons under Jeff Gieschen, the club appointed ex-St Kilda captain Danny Frawley. After a Preliminary Final appearance in Frawley's second season, Richmond overestimated the strength of the list and settled for trading for established players rather than drafting youth. Over the next three seasons, the team managed just 18 wins. The administration continued to support Frawley and ensured that he would see out his contract, a far cry from the way many of his predecessors were treated. However, midway through the 2004 season (a season in which Richmond only managed 4 wins, and lost their last 14 H&A matches), Frawley announced he would be relinquishing his role as Richmond coach at seasons' end.

=== Beginning to rebuild and another wooden spoon (2005–2007) ===
Under newly appointed head coach, Terry Wallace, the 2005 pre-season brought renewed optimism at the club. The Tigers held the no. 1 draft pick, selecting Brett Deledio who was touted as a future star and leader. However, the Tigers' first match of the season (against Geelong), quickly dashed that hope, as they were thrashed by 62 points. However, this loss would spark a change in the Tigers, and in the next 8 weeks of the season, they would go on to win 7 matches (the one exception being a 68-point loss at the hands of St Kilda in Round 5). This included wins over the then-reigning premiers, Port Adelaide, and over then-runners up, the Brisbane Lions. Sitting pretty at 7 wins and 2 losses, and 3rd on the ladder, the impossible prospect of finals football loomed large. However, in the Round 10 match against Melbourne, star player Nathan Brown suffered a horrible leg injury, that would sideline him for the rest of the season. They went on to lose the match by 57 points, and would only register 3 more wins for the season (one of those was against eventual premiers the Sydney Swans by one point, who had a one-point win against Collingwood the round before), eventually finishing 12th.

2006, a year which many experts predicted continued improvement for the Tigers, saw them lose their first H&A match by 115 points, against the Western Bulldogs, after which followed losses to St Kilda and West Coast. By the end of Round 3, things were looking grim for the Tigers once again. However, just as they did in 2005, the Tigers would respond to their poor start by winning 8 of their next 11 matches, and by the end of Round 14, the Tigers were in the Top 8 by a game and percentage. However, their spot in the Top 8 would be short lived, as 4 straight losses between Rounds 15 and 18 would effectively end their finals chances. They finished the 2006 season in 9th place, with 11 wins and 11 losses.

After promising seasons in 2005 and 2006, it was expected that the Tigers would take the next step in 2007, and play finals football. After massive hype in the off-season, the Tigers had a terrible start to the 2007 season, losing their first 9 matches (this included suffering their biggest ever defeat, at the hands of eventual premiers Geelong, by a whopping 157 points). Their first premiership points came in a draw against the Brisbane Lions in Round 10, and their first win of the season didn't come until Round 12 against fellow straggler Melbourne. After Round 18 of the season, the Tigers had registered a mere 1 win, 1 draw, and 16 losses, and were looking like recording their worst ever recorded season. However, late-season victories over old rivals Collingwood in Round 19, and Essendon in Round 21, saved them from this fate. They would eventually finish the year as wooden-spooners, with 3 wins, 1 draw, and 18 losses.

=== Centenary (2008) ===
After the end of the 2007 season, Richmond elected to delist Patrick Bowden, Brent Hartigan, Andrew Krakouer and Carl Peterson. These four joined another four players in leaving Punt Road—veteran Darren Gaspar, Kent Kingsley, Trent Knobel and Ray Hall. While these players left the club Jake King and Angus Graham were elevated off the rookie list.

Next up came the 2007 AFL draft, in which the Tigers recruited highly rated midfielder Trent Cotchin with their first pick (No. 2 overall), backman Alex Rance (pick No. 18 overall) and ruckman Dean Putt (pick No. 51 overall). Then, in the pre-season draft, they elected to pick David Gourdis with the number one pick. The Tigers also picked Clayton Collard, Jarrod Silvester, Tristan Cartledge and Cameron Howat for the rookie list. Cam Howat had previously been on the rookie list but was delisted then picked up again.

Richmond began the 2008 season with a surprise win over Carlton, but from Rounds 2 to 11, registered only two more wins (and a controversial draw against the Western Bulldogs). The club fought back in the latter half of the season, winning eight of its last 11 matches. However, this was not enough to reach the finals, as Richmond finished two premiership points short (and percentage) of 8th placed Collingwood.

=== Wallace era ends (2009) ===
At the start of 2009, Richmond was said to be rising as a team, and they would be in the eight . They had recruited former Brownlow Medal winner Ben Cousins – who had previously been released by the West Coast Eagles due to drug trouble – and they had rising stars in Brett Deledio and Trent Cotchin. However, the club was beaten by 83 points in Round 1 by Carlton, and did not register a win until Round 5, against North Melbourne. With a record of 2–9 after eleven weeks, Terry Wallace stepped down as coach, having announced his intention during the previous week. Jade Rawlings was announced as caretaker senior coach; he adopted a youth policy for the remainder of the year, which saw experienced players Joel Bowden and Matthew Richardson retire by the end of the year. Rawlings led Richmond to three wins and a draw from eleven games. Richmond finished fifteenth with a record of 5–16–1. On 25 August, Damien Hardwick was appointed to be the senior coach from 2010.

As Jade Rawlings, Craig McRae and Brian Royal left the Tigers assistant coaching panel, Brendon Lade and Justin Leppitsch were appointed as assistant coaches, leaving only Wayne Campbell as a previous Richmond assistant coach. Brendon Gale was also appointed CEO of the Tigers.

=== New coach, new list and a new beginning (2010–2012) ===
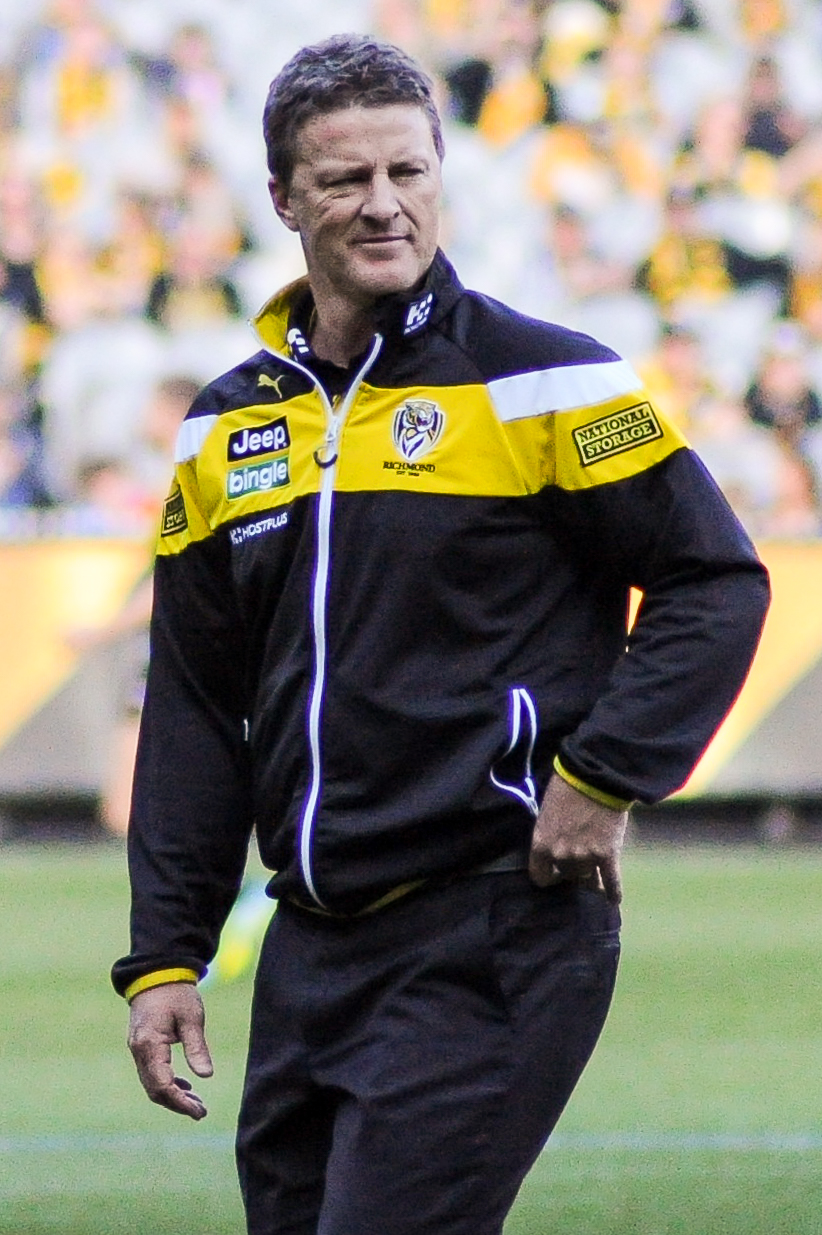
Damien Hardwick coached Richmond from 2010 to 2023.

Richmond was not expected to be competitive in 2010, with many commentators predicting the team would win no more than four games. From the 2009 AFL draft, the Tigers drafted seven new players, which included midfielder Dustin Martin. At the 2010 Pre-season Draft, Richmond recruited young key defender Dylan Grimes, brother of Melbourne defender Jack Grimes.

Damien Hardwick selected a young team at the start of the season, with four debutants, and only three players (Ben Cousins, Chris Newman and Troy Simmonds) over 25 in the Round 1 loss against Carlton. Richmond was winless after nine games, before a scrappy win over Port Adelaide in Round 10. This was the start of a turnaround in Richmond's form, with the team winning six out of eight games, to sit with a record of 6–12 after eighteen rounds. After losing the final four matches, Richmond finished fifteenth out of sixteen with a record of 6–16. Young key forward Jack Riewoldt finished the season with 78 goals, to win the Coleman Medal.

Very early in the season, Richmond were criticised for "partying too much" in the wake of its winless start to the season; after the Round 3 loss to the Sydney Swans, Richmond players were reported to be at the bar drinking and acting in a disorderly manner.

Richmond continued to show improvement to finish 12th out of 17 teams in 2011 with eight wins and a draw.

Jack Riewoldt again led the goalkicking with 62 majors, down on his previous year's tally of 78. Young midfielder Trent Cotchin won his first Jack Dyer Medal with 236 votes. Cotchin also polled the most votes of any Richmond player in the 2011 Brownlow Medal count with 15 votes. Dustin Martin was next best, polling 12 votes.

Richmond's 2012 season did not see an improvement from the previous three years, as they lost 6 games by 12 points or less and finished 12th for the second year running. Gold Coast also beat them, while trailing by ten points with less than a minute remaining, the Tigers produced what former Sydney Swans coach Paul Roos labelled "the worst 47 seconds in footy" to lose by two points. They did, however, defeat both of the eventual grand finalists Hawthorn and Sydney during the season, the only team to do so the entire year. 2012 also saw Richmond have its first Brownlow Medallist in over 40 years when Trent Cotchin polled 26 votes to be the joint winner with Hawthorn's Sam Mitchell, due to a countback 4 years later after disqualified winner Jobe Watson was stripped of his medal due to the Essendon Football Club supplements saga.

=== Return to finals (2013–2016) ===
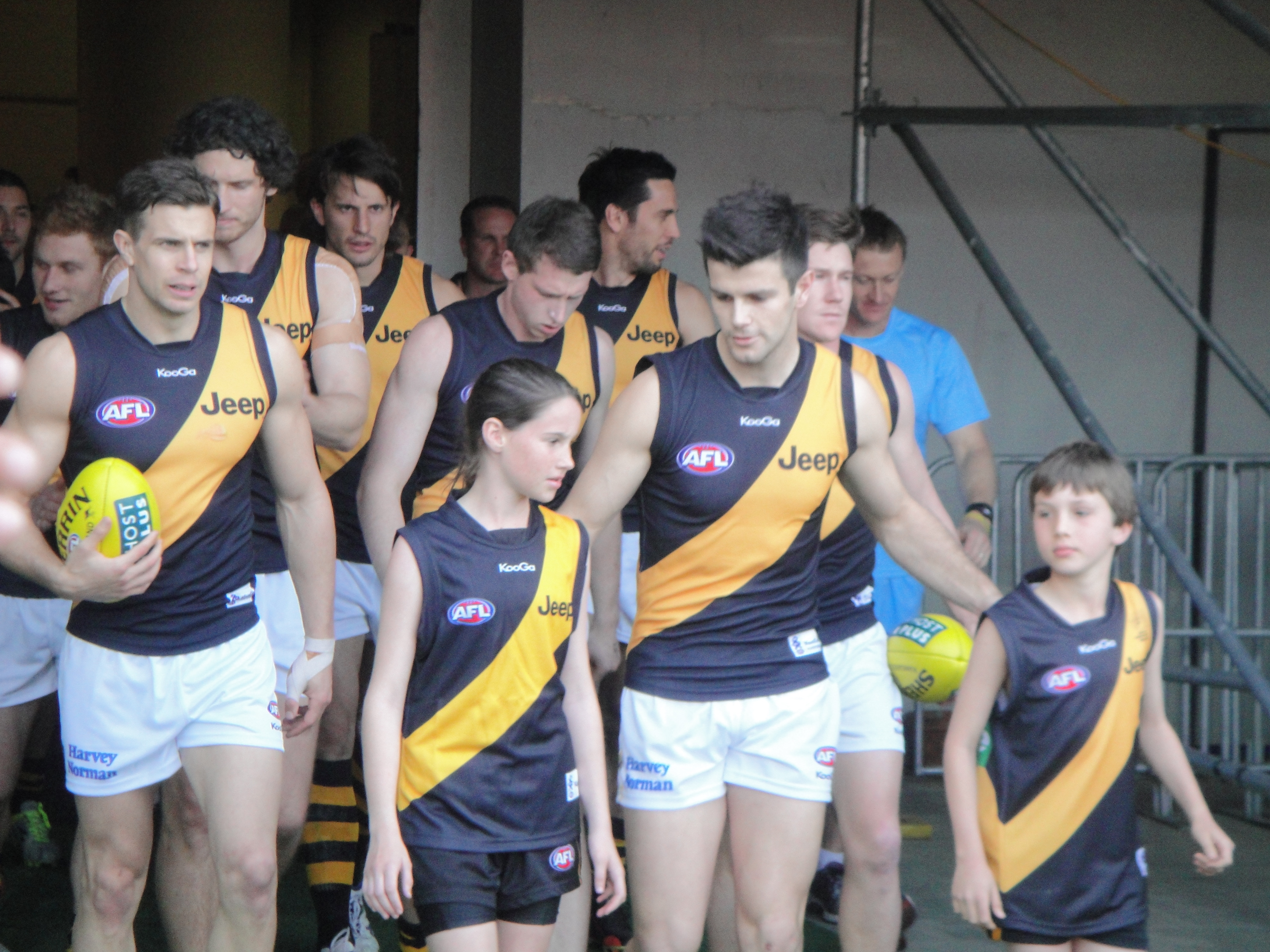
Captain Trent Cotchin leads Richmond out onto the ground before a match against Greater Western Sydney late in the 2013 season.

2013 saw Richmond claim a victory over Hawthorn (making it one of only two clubs that season to defeat the eventual premiers) and go on to qualify for its first finals series in over a decade. However, before 94,690 fans—the largest week-one crowd since the VFL/AFL adopted its current finals system—Richmond lost to Carlton in the first elimination final. Also that year, Peggy O'Neal, an American-born lawyer, became the AFL's first female club president when she got the position at Richmond.

After its drought-breaking finals appearance the previous year, Richmond failed to live up to expectations in the first half of the 2014 season, losing 10 of its first 13 matches and dropping to 16th place on the ladder. Despite public sentiment that the season was lost, the club rallied behind a five-goal performance by Cotchin to win against St Kilda. It catalysed a nine-match winning streak, with a Round 23 victory against eventual grand-finalists Sydney raising Richmond to 8th on the ladder and putting the club into its first back-to-back finals appearance since 1975. A 57-point loss to Port Adelaide in an elimination final knocked Richmond out in the first week of the finals. Cotchin won the Jack Dyer Medal for the third time in four years, making him the youngest Richmond player to win three club best and fairest awards.

Richmond faced the prospect of another disappointing season in 2015, losing 4 of its first 6 games. In the following weeks, however, the club registered 4 straight wins, including an upset victory over the previously undefeated Fremantle in Perth, and went on to defeat top-four teams Sydney and reigning premiers Hawthorn. Richmond would go on to win the final four games of the home and away season to finish fifth on the ladder. Facing North Melbourne in an elimination final, Richmond lost by 17 points in front of a crowd of 90,186, making it the club's third consecutive first weeks finals loss.

In 2016, Richmond failed to qualify for the finals for the first time in four years. Following a comprehensive Round 3 loss to Adelaide, coach Hardwick said the team would have to "take a little half-step back to go two steps forward." It would go on to be the story of the season with several major defeats including one against Greater Western Sydney in which Richmond registered its lowest score since 1961. The club debuted six players and brought in two recruits for their first games in the yellow and black.

=== Premiership success (2017–2020) ===
During the preseason period for 2016/17, Richmond made a number of changes to its playing list and coaching staff. Among these changes was the departure of Brett Deledio to Greater Western Sydney, in a three-way deal involving Geelong that saw the Tigers receive a 2017 first-round draft selection from the Cats, as well as a 2017 third-round selection from the Giants. Richmond also attained the services of Gold Coast Suns midfielder Dion Prestia, Geelong player Josh Caddy, and young Sydney Swans ruckman Toby Nankervis in preparation for the 2017 season.

2017 AFL Grand Final	G	B	Total
Richmond	16	12	108
Adelaide	8	12	60
Venue: Melbourne Cricket Ground	Crowd: 100,021

37 years and the Tigers are kings of the jungle again – it is Tiger Time, Bruce. There is no doubt about it at all... The Tigers are going to win the Premiership (siren sounds) in 2017! The Tigers have got home for the first time in 37 years!

— Brian Taylor's TV call of the Grand Final final siren on Seven Network

Richmond began 2017 with 5 straight wins, a feat it had not achieved since 1995. A series of close losses hampered the Tigers throughout the middle of the season, including a 5-point loss to the Western Bulldogs, 2-point loss to Fremantle, and a 3-point loss to the Giants. Richmond ended the season strongly with convincing victories over Fremantle and St Kilda in the final two rounds, elevating the club to 3rd on the ladder. Richmond's first final of the season – their qualifying final against the Cats at the MCG – attracted a record qualifying final crowd of 95,028; the Tigers won by 51 points. This sent them to their first preliminary final since 2001, in which Richmond defeated Greater Western Sydney by 36 points in front of a crowd of 94,258 to progress to the Grand Final against Adelaide, their first Grand Final appearance since 1982. The attendance was 100,021, the largest crowd for a Grand Final since 1986. The Crows led at quarter time and were in front by as much as 13, but the Tigers took over the game as it progressed and kicked seven straight goals at one point with former South Australian U-19 captain Jack Graham finishing as the game's leading goalscorer after kicking three despite playing only his fifth game at AFL level. They eventually would win by 48 points – 16.12 (108) to Adelaide's 8.12 (60) – to end their 37-year flag drought. Dustin Martin also became the first player to win a Premiership medal, the Brownlow Medal and the Norm Smith Medal in the same season, while Damien Hardwick was named AFL Coaches Association Coach of the Year. Richmond's jump from 13th to premiers also marked the biggest jump from one AFL season to the next.

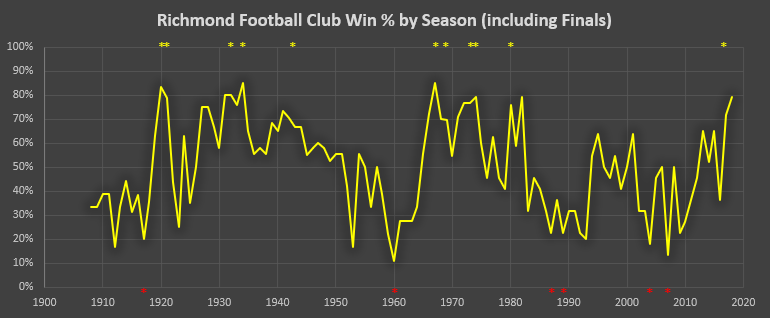
Richmond Football Club Win % by Season (including Finals)Gold * denotes Premiership Red * denotes Wooden Spoon

The reigning premiers were dominant throughout the 2018 season, winning their first minor premiership since 1982 with an 18–4 win–loss record. Richmond won all 17 of their games in Victoria during the home-and-away season, and broke the record for most consecutive wins at the MCG, winning 22 games at the venue (starting from round 14, 2017) and eclipsing the record of 17 set by Melbourne in 1955–56.

The Tigers defeated Hawthorn by 31 points in the first qualifying final at the MCG and were seemingly destined to win a second consecutive flag. However, they were stunningly denied a repeat Grand Final appearance after Collingwood defeated them by 39 points in the first preliminary final.

Jack Riewoldt had a successful year for Richmond, winning his third Coleman Medal after kicking 65 goals during the regular season, his second Jack Dyer Medal and receiving his third All-Australian selection. Three other Tigers received All-Australian honours: Alex Rance (fullback), Dustin Martin (centre) and Shane Edwards (interchange), and four more were shortlisted in the initial 40-man squad: captain Trent Cotchin, Josh Caddy, Dylan Grimes and Kane Lambert. Forward/midfielder Jack Higgins won Goal of the Year for a scissor-kick goal against Collingwood in Round 19.

At the conclusion of the season, Richmond acquired former Gold Coast co-captain Tom Lynch via free agency on 8 October. Five players departed the club during the free agency and trade periods: Reece Conca left to Fremantle as a free agent on 5 October, Anthony Miles and Corey Ellis were traded to Gold Coast along with a third round draft pick on 8 October in exchange for another third round pick, Tyson Stengle was traded to Adelaide in exchange for its fourth round pick on 15 October, and Sam Lloyd was sent to the Western Bulldogs for pick 64 on 15 October. In addition, Ben Griffiths retired in January to pursue a college football career in the United States and Shaun Hampson retired on 26 June, citing a chronic back condition.

Richmond were looking to rebound in 2019 after the bitter disappointment of their unexpected preliminary final exit. They suffered various setbacks during the first half of the season, with several of their best players sidelined, most notably Alex Rance who suffered a career-ending ACL injury in Round 1 against Carlton. The Tigers were resilient in spite of their misfortune, winning six games in a seven-game stretch from round four to round 10. Despite a midseason slump where three losses on the trot dislodged them from the top eight, the Tigers re-emerged from the mid-year bye a different team and would not lose again for the rest of the season. They won their last nine games of the home-and-away season and finished third on the ladder with a 16–6 win–loss record, trailing minor premiers Geelong and second-placed Brisbane on percentage.

2019 AFL Grand Final	G	B	Total
Richmond	17	12	114
Greater Western Sydney	3	7	25
Venue: Melbourne Cricket Ground	Crowd: 100,014

They would defeat both teams en route to their second grand final in three years, dispatching the Lions by 47 points in the second qualifying final at the Gabba (marking their first interstate finals victory) before coming from 21 points down at half time to beat the Cats by 19 points in the second preliminary final at the MCG. They met Greater Western Sydney in the 2019 AFL Grand Final on 28 September, thrashing the Giants by 89 points – their biggest ever win in a grand final, eclipsing their 81-point victory over Collingwood in 1980. Martin won his second Norm Smith Medal, becoming just the fourth to win multiple Norm Smith Medals after Gary Ayres, Andrew McLeod and Luke Hodge. Cotchin equaled Dan Minogue, Percy Bentley and Royce Hart with his second Premiership as Richmond captain while Hardwick became the Tigers' first multiple Premiership coach since Tom Hafey – whose widow Maureen presented the two of them with the Premiership cup. Richmond also chose to debut Marlion Pickett, who they had drafted midseason following Grigg's retirement and who had won the Norm Goss Medal in the VFL Grand Final against Williamstown the previous week. Pickett not only became the first player to make his senior debut in an AFL or VFL Grand Final since Keith Batchelor for Collingwood in 1952, but he also kicked his first AFL goal in the third quarter and finished with four Norm Smith Medal votes.

2020 AFL Grand Final	G	B	Total
Richmond	12	9	81
Geelong	7	8	50
Venue: The Gabba	Crowd: 29,707

Despite some off-field indiscretions during the 2020 season and playing most of the season interstate due to the COVID-19 pandemic, the reigning premiers finished in the top four for the fourth consecutive season, qualifying in third place with 12 wins, four losses and a draw after a shortened 17-match home-and-away season. Richmond faltered against the Brisbane Lions in the qualifying final, but recovered to play in their third Grand Final in four years after defeating St Kilda by 31 points in the semi-final and pipping minor premiers Port Adelaide by six points in the preliminary final. The Tigers would meet Geelong at the Gabba in the first VFL/AFL Grand Final to be played outside Victoria, and despite trailing the Cats by 22 points deep in the second term, Richmond scored 10 of the final 12 goals of the match to run out 31-point winners. It marked their third premiership in four years and also made them the first team since Hawthorn completed their three-peat in 2015 to win consecutive premierships. Martin, who kicked four goals, became the first-ever three-time Norm Smith Medalist, while Cotchin became the club's first-ever three-time Premiership captain.

=== End of a dynasty (2021–present) ===
The Tigers' four-year era of success would come to a halt in 2021. Despite a decent start to the year, winning seven of their first 12 matches, the reigning premiers would fall away rapidly to win just two of their last 10. With a season record of nine wins, 12 losses and a draw, Richmond finished 12th and missed the finals for the first time since 2016. The Tigers became the fourth team in five years to miss the finals after playing in the previous year's grand final, following 2016 premiers the Western Bulldogs, 2017 runners-up Adelaide and 2019 runners-up Greater Western Sydney.

At the conclusion of the season, triple-premiership captain Trent Cotchin relinquished his role as skipper, and Dylan Grimes and Toby Nankervis were appointed as co-captains for the 2022 season.

Richmond were looking to rebound quickly from their poor 2021 season. Despite some inconsistent form throughout the 2022 season, which included dispiriting losses to also-rans Gold Coast and North Melbourne, and a low-scoring draw against Fremantle, the Tigers were able to secure an eighth finals berth in 10 seasons, finishing seventh on the ladder with 13 wins, eight losses and one draw. However, their finals campaign came to an early end after a heart-breaking two-point loss to Brisbane in a high scoring elimination final. Three time premiership player and 300 gamer Shane Edwards announced his retirement at the conclusion of the season.

The 2023 season truly was the end of the Dynasty Era at Tigerland. Three time premiership coach Damien Hardwick announced he would be resigning from his position after a 1-point defeat to Essendon in Round 10. This shocked the football world as Hardwick sited 'burnout' as his reasoning for departing the club prior to his contract ending. Later in the year he would sign a 6-year deal as coach of the Gold Coast Suns, confusing many of the Richmond faithful.

Andrew McQualter took the reins as interim coach for the remainder of the season with mixed success. The club would eventually finish 13th and miss the finals with 10 wins, 12 losses and a draw. Late in the season, club legends Trent Cotchin & Jack Riewoldt announced they would be retiring after the clubs Round 23 fixture against North Melbourne at the MCG. Over 60,000 supporters turned out to farewell the retiring champions as the Tigers won the match by 29 points.

The season finished with Richmond suffering a loss at Adelaide Oval against Port Adelaide, with many of the clubs young players being showcased – showing promising signs for the seasons ahead. The club announced on 21 September that Adem Yze would be taking over as the clubs new Senior Coach, beating Andrew McQualter to win the position.

Richmond finished last on the AFL ladder in 2024, claiming its eighth wooden spoon only four years after winning its most recent premiership. Premiership players Dylan Grimes, Dustin Martin and Marlion Pickett all retired following the conclusion of the season.

== Club identity and culture ==
Initially, Richmond saw itself as a gentlemanly and sportsman-like club; it even went to the extent of sacking a player who used poor language. During the early 1900s, the club used the press as a forum to publicise a campaign against violence in the game, which earned the derision of some rival clubs. This image followed the club into the VFL in 1908 and during the First World War the club emphasised the number of men associated with the club who had enlisted and served overseas. But the club's actions in 1916, when it voted with three other clubs seen as representative of the working class (Collingwood, Fitzroy and Carlton) to continue playing football, left no doubt as to which side of the class divide that the Tigers belonged. The club's self-consciously non-confrontational image can be partly attributed to two of its long serving presidents—George Bennett (1887–1908) and Frank Tudor (1909–1918). Both were Richmond men and respected parliamentarians who took the view that how the game was played was more important than whether the game was won.

After World War I, the club's attitude hardened as they attempted to match it with the then power clubs Collingwood and Carlton. Eventually, the Tigers became more prosaic in their approach to recruiting and training.

The Hafey era transformed Richmond into one of the most feared combinations in the then VFL. The club's football administrator, Graeme Richmond, drove the "win at all costs" mentality across the whole club, making Richmond a formidable force, winning five premierships from 1967 to 1980.

Since the Tigers' grand final appearance in 1982, the club appeared in five finals series (1995, 2001, 2013, 2014 and 2015) before winning another preliminary final and eventually breaking their Premiership drought as board and coaching instability during the 1980s and 1990s distracted the club and forced its focus away from becoming an on-field force.

The club also hosts the Korin Gamadji Institute (KGI) at Punt Road, which has delivered highly-unique and innovative leadership and well-being programming for young Indigenous boys and girls since 2008. In 2018, Richmond became the first sports club to present at the United Nations Permanent Forum on Indigenous Issues.

=== Guernseys ===
The club's current home jumper design is black and features a yellow sash running from the top left of the jumper to the bottom right. For away games against teams with dark coloured jumpers, the club wears a clash strip with a reverse of this design, a black sash on a yellow base. In its first season, Richmond wore a blue jumper with a thin yellow-and-black sash running from right to left. Between 2011 and 2016, the club guernseys were manufactured by sportswear company BLK, who were known as KooGa Australia prior to 2014, before it went into receivership in November 2016. Puma manufactures the club's on-and-off field apparel. With the change to Puma, the yellow used is reasonably lighter than the sash seen in the past few years.

==== Uniform evolution ====
Richmond's uniform changes throughout their history.

1885–86	1887–1900	1900–06	1907	1908–09	1910–13

1914–18	1919–23	1924–28	1929–77	1978–2000	2001–03

2004–2016	2017–present

=== Theme song ===
Prior to 1962, the Richmond Football Club did not have an official club song. Instead, on away trips players would sing from a large collection of well-known ditties like "With a Hat on One Side", and "Barefoot Days". A record, endorsed or officially adopted by the club, was released in the 1950s by The Thinmen and The Party Allstars called "Onward the Tigers" (before 1962), set to the tune of the traditional Australian bush ballad "Waltzing Matilda". In 1962, Jack Malcomson, a cabaret singer, tapdancer, and bit actor, who was performing regularly at the Richmond Football Club Pleasant Sunday Morning events, was approached by committeeman Alf Barnett to write an official club song, so he adapted "Row, Row, Row" (Monaco/Jerome), a show tune from the Ziegfeld Follies of 1912, to create "We're From Tigerland". The current version of the song used by the club is a modified version of the 1972 recording performed by the Fable Singers, released for the start of season 2018; Richmond Team of the Century players Kevin Bartlett and Matthew Richardson's voices were incorporated into the new mix. The song replaces "skin" with "shin", which was Malcomson's original lyric. In 2014, the Herald Sun named it the top club song of any AFL team. "Tigerland" is noted for the line "Yellow and black", which fans of the club shout when the song is performed at games.

Oh, we're from Tigerland
A fighting fury, we're from Tigerland
In any weather, you will see us with a grin
Risking head and shin
If we're behind, then never mind
We'll fight and fight and win
For we're from Tigerland
We never weaken 'till the final siren's gone
Like the tiger of old
We're strong and we're bold
For we're from Tiger
Yellow and black
We're from Tigerland

== Home ground and Training and administration base ==
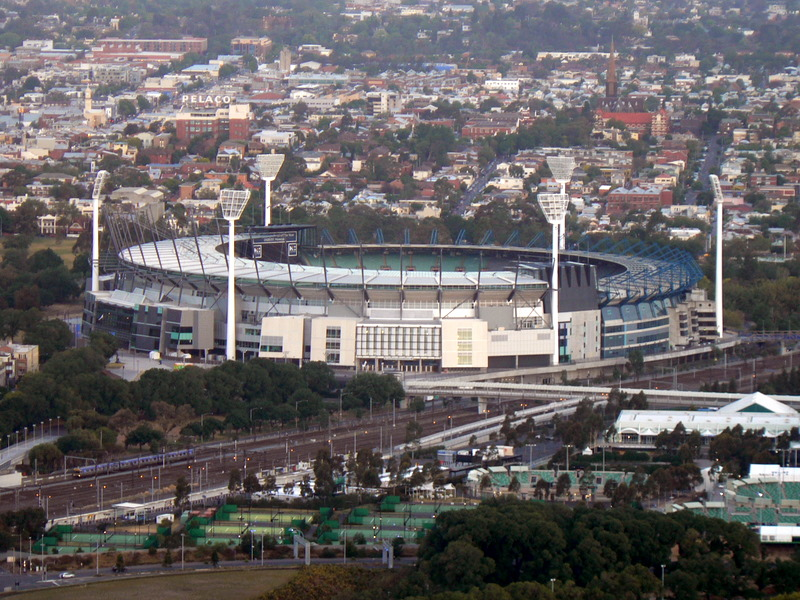
The MCG, Richmond's home ground since 1965

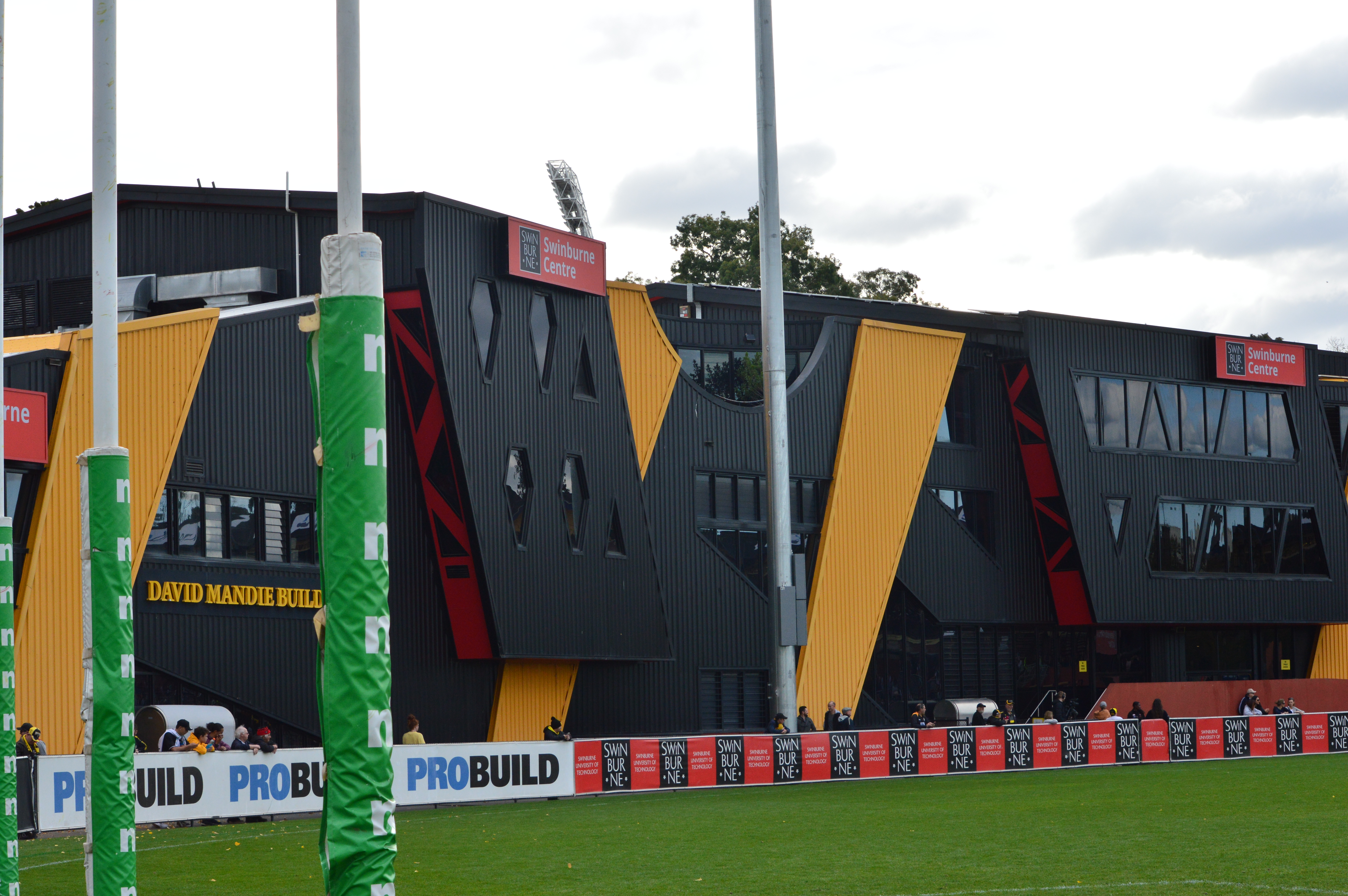
The David Mandie building at Punt Road Oval is home to Richmond's training facilities and administrative headquarters.

The club's home ground is the Melbourne Cricket Ground (MCG), where the team plays most of their home matches in the regular season. The MCG has a capacity of 100,024 and the club usually draws large attendances against Victorian clubs, particularly rivals such as Essendon, Collingwood, Carlton and Hawthorn.

The club also played select home games against local and interstate clubs with smaller supporter bases at Docklands Stadium in Melbourne. Between 2011 and 2025 it played one home game per year at the ground. In 2026 the club moved its Docklands Stadium home game to Bellerive Oval in Hobart, Tasmania.

The club has been historically based at Punt Road Oval, a smaller-capacity ground in the Yarra Park precinct several hundred metres away from the MCG. Punt Road hosted 544 VFL/AFL premiership matches between 1908 and 1964, until the club shifted home matches to the MCG ahead of the 1965 season.

Richmond continued to base its training and administrative facilities at Punt Road Oval, which has been the home ground for the club's reserves-grade team in the Victorian Football League (VFL) and women's team in the AFL Women's (AFLW). The club has temporarily shifted its training facilities to Waverley Park, and VFL/AFLW matches to other grounds, whilst Punt Road undergoes an extensive redevelopment expected to conclude in late 2027.

== Administration and corporate ==
Club administration since 1908

Richmond Football Club administration since 1977
Year	President	Chief Executive Officer	Treasurer
2025-	John O'Rourke	Shane Dunne	Tina De Young
2023-2024	John O'Rourke	Brendon Gale	Tina De Young
2018–2022	Peggy O'Neal	Brendon Gale	Tina De Young
2013–2018	Peggy O'Neal	Brendon Gale	Robert Dalton
2010–2012	Gary March	Brendon Gale	Robert Dalton
Year	President	General manager	Treasurer
2006–2009	Gary March	Steve Wright	Garry Cameron
2005	Clinton Casey Gary March	Steve Wright	Garry Cameron
2004	Clinton Casey	Ian Campbell; Steve Wright	Garry Cameron
2003	Clinton Casey	Ian Campbell	Garry Cameron
2001–2002	Clinton Casey	Mark Brayshaw	Garry Cameron
2000	Clinton Casey	Mark Brayshaw	Terry Grigg
1999	Leon Daphne	Jim Malone	Terry Grigg
1995–1998	Leon Daphne	Jim Malone	Keith Miller
1994	Leon Daphne	Cameron Schwab Mal Brown, Jim Malone	Keith Miller
1993	Neville Crowe; Leon Daphne	Cameron Schwab	Keith Miller
1991–1992	Neville Crowe	Cameron Schwab	Keith Miller
1989–1990	Neville Crowe	Cameron Schwab	Michael Humphris
1988	Neville Cowe	Richard Doggett Cameron Schwab	Michael Humphris
1987	Alan Bond; Neville Crowe	Richard Doggett	Michael Humphris
1986	Bill Durham	Kevin Dixon; Richard Doggett	John McCormack; Michael Humphris
1985	Ian Wilson; Barry Richardson	Kevin Dixon	John McCormack
1981–1984	Ian Wilson	Kevin Dixon	Ron Carson
1980	Ian Wilson	Richard Doggett	Richard Doggett
1979	Ian Wilson	Gareth Andrews; Richard Doggett	Gareth Andrews; Richard Doggett
1978	Ian Wilson	Gareth Andrews	Gareth Andrews

Richmond Football Club administration until 1977
Year	President	Secretary	Treasurer
1977	Ian Wilson	Max Scales,Gareth Andrews	Max Scales, Gareth Andrews
1974–1976	Ian Wilson	Alan Schwab	Alan Schwab
1973	Al Board	Alan Schwab	Alan Schwab
1972	Al Board	Alan Schwab	Pat Kennelly; Alan Schwab
1971	Ray Dunn; Al Board	Alan Schwab	Pat Kennelly
1970	Ray Dunn	Alan Schwab	Ron Carson
1969	Ray Dunn	Alan Schwab	Graeme Richmond
1968	Ray Dunn	Graeme Richmond; Alan Schwab	Ron Carson; Graeme Richmond
1966–1967	Ray Dunn	Graeme Richmond	Ron Carson
1965	Ray Dunn	Graeme Richmond	Graeme Richmond
1964	Ray Dunn	Graeme Richmond	I Cameron
1963	Maurie Fleming	Graeme Richmond	Bill Tymms
1962	Maurie Fleming	Bill Tymms; Graeme Richmond	Bill Tymms
1960–1961	Maurie Fleming	Bill Tymms	Bill Tymms
1959	Maurie Fleming	Bill Tymms	Bill Quinn
1958	Harry Dyke; Maurie Fleming	Bill Tymms	Bill Quinn
1956–1957	Harry Dyke	Bill Tymms	Bill Quinn
1955	Harry Dyke	Hector Lingwood-Smith; Bill Tymms	Bill Quinn
1953–1954	Harry Dyke	Maurie Fleming	Bill Quinn
1952	Harry Dyke	Maurie Fleming; Hector Lingwood-Smith	Bill Quinn
1950–1951	Harry Dyke	Maurie Fleming	Bill Quinn
1949	Harry Dyke	Maurie Fleming	Jack Smith; Bill Quinn
1947–1948	Harry Dyke	Maurie Fleming	Jack Smith
1940–1946	Harry Dyke	Maurie Fleming	Charlie Turner
1939	Barney Herbert	Maurie Sheahan	Charlie Turner
1938	Lou Roberts	John Smith	Charlie Turner
1937	Lou Roberts	John Smith	George Smith
1936	Lou Roberts	John Smith	Jos Langdon
1932–1935	Barney Herbert	John Smith	Jos Langdon
1925–1931	Jack Archer	Percy Page	Jos Langdon
1924	Jack Archer	Percy Page	Abe Aarons
1921–1923	Alf Wood	Bill Maybury	Abe Aarons
1919–1920	Alf Wood	Bill Maybury	Jack Archer
1917–1918	Frank Tudor	Bill Maybury	Jack Archer
1913–1916	Frank Tudor	Bill Lohse	Jack Archer
1912	Frank Tudor	George Beachcroft	James MacDermott
1909–1911	Frank Tudor	Andrew Manzie	Archie McNair
1908	George Bennett	Andrew Manzie	Archie McNair

=== Supporter base ===
Richmond has a large supporter base which is known for its dedication, including its personal cheer squad, who attend both home and away matches for the club.

The building of the fan base was a slow process for Richmond. In the 1890s, the club never sold more than 300 season tickets, but the following was built up with success in the VFA and membership numbered about 2,000 at the time of admission to the VFL in 1908. Between the wars, the club captured the imagination of the residents of Richmond. The successful Tigers were a positive motif for the oppressed working class community which suffered deprivation during the Great Depression. At this time, the Richmond community was almost half Catholic, and this demographic was reflected in the club among the players and officials.

As Melbourne dramatically spread out in the post-war years, so too did the Richmond supporters. Many were now concentrated in the eastern suburbs, which eventually formed the club's metropolitan recruiting zone. Indeed, at one point during the early development of the Waverley Park ground, the Tigers considered making the stadium its home for this reason. Following the barren period of the 1950s, Richmond was able to tap into the large number of fans by moving home matches to the MCG and almost doubled attendance figures. The Tigers maintained this advantage over the other clubs until the mid-1980s, when poor administration led to a downturn in every area of the club. As the club struggled for funds, the membership plummeted from over 10,000 to under 3,000.

The greatest display of loyalty from the fans occurred during 1990. Threatened by liquidation, the supporters rallied to pay off the multimillion-dollar debt via the "Save Our Skins" campaign. In 2011, the club launched the Fighting Tiger Fund to reduce the club's debt and to allow it to increase spending on the football department in order to be more competitive on field.

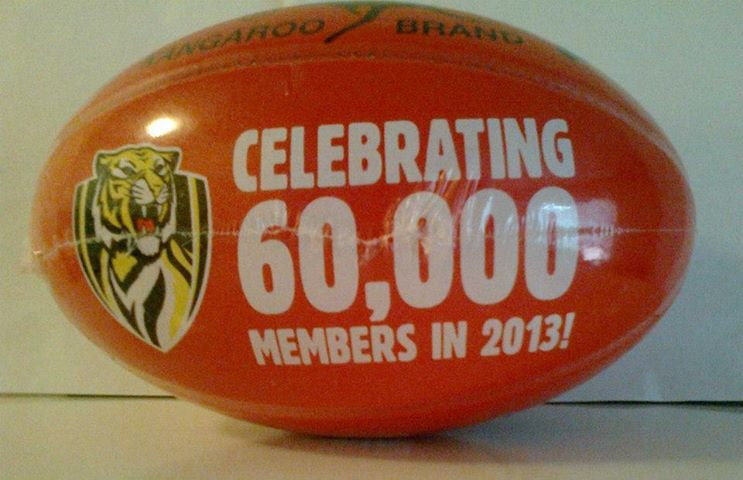
RFC commemorative football 2013

In 2013, the club launched The Roar is Back membership promotion aiming at signing up 60,000 members in a season for the first time ever. Following a successful campaign, on 24 June 2013, Richmond chief executive Brendon Gale confirmed that membership had passed 60,000. The club created a limited edition commemorative Sherrin football to celebrate the achievement, and it was distributed free to families at the 'Thank you for 60,000 members BBQ/Training Morning' at Punt Road Oval on 29 June 2013. The official membership total for 2013 was 60,321.

For statistical purposes, 30 June is the cut-off date for membership numbers, although it does continue to sell memberships. In 2013, after 30 June, the club commenced bundling 2013 and 2014 membership years into a special "Sign up as a member for 2014 and get the rest of 2013 free!" offer. The 2014 membership total of 66,122 gave Richmond the 3rd-biggest membership base in the AFL, behind Collingwood and Hawthorn (80,793 and 68,650, respectively). This record was again broken in 2015 with the club signing up 70,809 members, still ranking 3rd in total membership numbers. The club averaged the highest crowds in the AFL of 49,841 in 2015; the home crowd averaged 53,236 the highest in the 2015 AFL season.

Following Richmond's 2017 premiership, the club shattered its membership record by more than 28,000 for season 2018 and became the first team to get over 100,000 members when it registered 100,726 members. It also had the most members of any Australian sporting team until West Coast eclipsed it in 2022. Richmond surpassed the 100,000-member mark for six years running, between 2018 and 2023.

==== Membership ====
Attendance for Richmond Football Club games
Season	Ticketed Members	Ladder Position	Finals	Premiers	Average Home Attendance	Average Away Attendance	Average Finals Attendance	Average Season Attendance	Total Season Attendance
2026	92,648 ▲	17			41,717	38,697		40,141	923,247
2025	92,531 ▼	17			41,534	39,807		40,708	936,278
2024	98,489 ▼	18			44,403	42,912		43,691	1,004,886
2023	101,349 ▲	13			50,646	47,581		49,180	1,131,144
2022	100,535 ▼	7	Yes		46,485	39,465	35,013	42,975	980,456
2021	**105,084** ▲	12			30,116***	37,243***		33,705***	606,081***
2020	100,420 ▼	3	Yes	Yes	3,850**	8,125**	22,470**	10,108**	161,735**
2019	103,358 ▲	3	Yes	Yes	59,987	41,682	77,305	54,011*	1,350,275*
2018	100,726 ▲	1	Yes		**61,175**	47,452	93,203	**57,554***	**1,381,298***
2017	72,669 ▲	3	Yes	Yes	55,958	37,201	**96,436**	52,562*	1,314,058*
2016	72,278 ▲	13			41,155	40,684		40,920	900,237
2015	70,809 ▲	5	Yes		49,877	45,974	90,186	49,841*	1,146,335*
2014	66,122 ▲	8	Yes		43,196	33,147	49,886	38,712*	890,377*
2013	60,321 ▲	5	Yes		50,901	43,671	94,690	49,477*	1,137,980*
2012	53,027 ▲	12			41,319	37,909		39,614	871,504
2011	40,184 ▲	12			42,784	38,606		40,695	895,290
2010	35,960 ▼	15			37,452	38,434		37,943	834,744
2009	36,985 ▲	15			43,165	35,822		39,493	868,855
2008	30,820 ▲	9			43,548	41,452		42,500	935,002
2007	30,044 ▲	16			38,255	44,400		41,327	909,203
2006	29,406 ▲	9			42,929	34,849		38,889	855,556
2005	28,029 ▲	12			35,800	37,189		36,495	802,885
2004	27,133 ▲	16			35,378	32,984		34,181	751,982
2003	25,101 ▼	13			35,630	39,901		37,766	830,841
2002	27,251 ▲	14			32,796	37,759		35,278	776,113
2001	26,501 ▼	4	Yes		46,129	42,532	66,203	46,955*	1,173,875*
2000	26,869 ▼	9			44,012	33,617		38,814	853,916
1999	29,047 ▲	12			40,533	39,936		40,235	885,159
1998	27,092 ▲	9			44,307	**48,768**		46,537	1,023,821
1997	24,975 ▲	13			34,515	36,713		35,614	783,517
1996	20,308 ▲	9			38,624	38,737		38,680	850,966
1995	14,647 ▲	3	Yes		41,952	37,844	75,168	44,184*	1,104,607*
1994	8,229 ▼	9			33,968	24,787		29,377	646,301
1993	9,918 ▲	14			24,853	23,552		24,202	484,041
1992	8,158	13			20,888	22,255		21,572	474,575

Club records in bold text.

^{*} Includes three finals in 1995, 2001, 2017, 2019; two finals in 2018 and one final in 2013, 2014, 2015.
^{**} 2020 crowds were significantly affected due to the COVID-19 pandemic.
^{***} Crowds during the second half of the 2021 season were also significantly affected by the COVID-19 pandemic, excluding matches in Perth.

==== Cheer squad ====
The Official Richmond Cheer Squad is an organised group of passionate supporters who attend every Richmond game whether in Melbourne or interstate. There are also supporter groups located in each state of Australia.

== Club honour board ==
=== Premiership teams ===
See Richmond premiership teams

=== Richmond Team of the Century ===
In 1998, Richmond announced its Team of the 20th Century. The selection of the 22 players shows an even spread of champions from all the eras of the club: Thorp from the club's first premiership wins of 1920–21; McCormack, Strang, Titus and Dyer from the inter-war years; Rowe, Morris and Wright from the battling era after the war; Richardson and Knights from recent times. But the great days from the late 1960s to the early 1980s provide the bulk of the side: Sheedy, Green, Keane, Bourke, Barrot, Clay, Hart, Dean and Bartlett who made up the core of Tom Hafey's teams, and later success stories Weightman and Raines. Ian Stewart, named on the bench, managed selection in a team of the century at two clubs—he was named in the centre of St Kilda's team as well. Richmond has four players denoted below with an asterisk who are also members of AFL Team of the Century. This is the second-most of any club.

Richmond Team of the Century
B:	Kevin Sheedy 1967–79, 180 cm 81k, 251 games 91 goals	Vic Thorp 1910–25, 178 cm 83k, 263 games 7 goals	Michael Green 1966–75, 193 cm 94k, 146 games 83 goals
HB:	Basil McCormack 1925–36, 180 cm 80k, 199 games 1 goal	Gordon Strang 1931–38, 185 cm 83k, 116 games 108 goals	Mervyn Keane 1972–84, 185 cm 82k, 238 games 36 goals
C:	Francis Bourke * 1967–81, 185 cm 83k, 300 games 71 goals	Bill Barrot 1961–70, 180 cm 76k, 120 games 91 goals	Dick Clay 1966–76, 185 cm 85k, 213 games 80 goals
HF:	Matthew Richardson 1993–2009 , 197 cm 103k, 282 games 800 goals	Royce Hart * 1967–77, 187 cm 86k, 187 games 369 goals	Roger Dean 1957–73, 175 cm 73k, 245 games 204 goals
F:	Dale Weightman 1978–93, 170 cm 69k, 274 games 344 goals	Jack Titus 1926–43, 175 cm 66k, 294 games 970 goals	Bill Morris 1942–51, 188 cm 86k, 140 games 98 goals
Foll:	Roy Wright 1946–59, 188 cm, 102k, 195 games 127 goals	Jack Dyer * (capt) 1931–49, 185 cm 89k, 312 games 443 goals	Kevin Bartlett 1965–83, 175 cm 71k, 403 games 778 goals
Int:	Des Rowe 1946–57, 182 cm 83k, 175 games 24 goals	Geoff Raines 1976–82, 180 cm 78k, 134 games 53 goals	Ian Stewart * 1971–75, 180 cm 78k, 78 games 55 goals
Coach:	Tom Hafey Coached 248 games – Won 173, lost 73, Drawn 2		

=== Australian Football Hall of Fame members ===
As legends of the game:

- Jack Dyer (inaugural "Legend")
- Kevin Bartlett
- Ian Stewart
- Royce Hart
- Kevin Sheedy

As players of the game:

- Percy Bentley
- Francis Bourke
- Dan Minogue
- Bill Morris
- Charlie Pannam
- Vic Thorp
- Jack Titus
- Dale Weightman
- Roy Wright
- Matthew Richardson
- Maurice Rioli

As coaches of the game:

- Tom Hafey
- Frank 'Checker' Hughes

=== Richmond Hall of Fame ===
The Richmond 'Hall of Fame' was created in 2002, with 24 inaugural inductees. Since then there have been a further twelves batches of inductees added, most recently in 2023, for a total of 69 members. Below is a list of members, their contributions to the club, and the year they were inducted. To date, nine Richmond "Immortals" have been named, the highest level of honour within the Hall of Fame. The first of these was Jack Dyer, who was immediately made an 'immortal' upon his induction into the Hall of Fame in 2002, the year before his death.

The Immortals are highlighted in yellow in the table below and have their names in bold.

Richmond Hall of Fame inductees
Name	Category	Career (at Richmond)	Year Inducted	Year 'Immortal'
Jack Baggott	Player	1927–35	2019	
Neil Balme	Player	1970–79 (player), 2017–current (administration)	2010	
Bill Barrot	Player	1961–70	2007	
**Kevin Bartlett**	Player	1965–83 (player), 1988–91 (coach)	2002	2004
Percy Bentley	Player	1925–40 (player), 1934–40 (coach)	2002	
Martin Bolger	Player	1930–39 (player), 1940–75 (admin)	2005	
**Francis Bourke**	Player	1967–81 (player), 1982–83 (coach), 1992–94 (admin)	2002	2005
Joel Bowden	Player	1996–09	2022	
Ron Branton	Player	1953–62	2006	
Wayne Campbell	Player	1991–2005	2013	
**Dick Clay**	Player	1966–76 (player), 1985 (admin)	2002	2023
David Cloke	Player	1974–82, 1990–91	2007	
**Roger Dean**	Player	1957–73 (player)	2002	2019
Donald Don	Player	1917–28	2015	
**Jack Dyer**	Player	1931–49 (player), 1941–52 (coach), 1949–53, 1956–63 (admin)	2002	2002
Alec Edmond	Player	1899–1907	2007	
Tony Free	Player	1987–96	2019	
Allan Geddes	Player	1925–35	2007	
Michael Green	Player	1966–75	2004	
Paddy Guinane	Player	1958–68	2023	
Clarrie Hall	Player	1912–22, 1924 (player), 1924–29, 1932–35 (admin)	2006	
Richard 'Dick' Harris	Player	1934–44 (player), 1964 (coach)	2004	
**Royce Hart**	Player	1967–77 (player), 1977 (admin)	2002	2008
Frank Hughes	Player	1914–23 (player), 1927–32 (coach)	2004	
Hugh James	Player	1909–16, 1919–23	2005	
Jim Jess	Player	1976–88	2008	
Stan Judkins	Player	1928–36	2022	
Mervyn Keane	Player	1972–84	2005	
Matthew Knights	Player	1988–2002	2011	
Mark Lee	Player	1977–91	2010	
Ray Martin	Player	1930–40	2010	
Basil McCormack	Player	1925–36 (player), 1955–71 (admin)	2004	
Leo Merrett	Player	1940–49	2022	
Bill Morris	Player	1942–51	2002	
Joe Murdoch	Player	1927–36	2011	
Chris Newman	Player	2002–15	2022	
John Northey	Player	1963–70 (player), 1993–95 (coach)	2011	
Tom O'Halloran	Player	1925–34	2013	
Kevin O'Neill	Player	1930–41	2008	
Max Oppy	Player	1942–54 (player), 1956 (coach)	2004	
Geoff Raines	Player	1976–82	2008	
Matthew Richardson	Player	1993–2009	2015	
Michael Roach	Player	1977–89	2002	
Des Rowe	Player	1946–57 (player), 1961–63 (coach)	2004	
Havel Rowe	Player	1948–57	2015	
Barry Rowlings	Player	1979–86	2015	
Kevin Sheedy	Player	1967–79	2002	
Jimmy Smith	Player	1917–26	2023	
Ian Stewart	Player	1971–75	2013	
**Vic Thorp**	Player	1910–25 (player), 1927–35 (admin)	2002	2015
**Jack Titus**	Player	1926–43 (player), 1965 (coach) 1944–77 (admin)	2002	2019
Wayne Walsh	Player	1968, 1972–78	2013	
Dale Weightman	Player	1978–93	2002	
Bryan Wood	Player	1972–82	2006	
Roy Wright	Player	1946–59	2002	
**Tom Hafey**	Servant	1953–58 (player), 1966–76 (coach)	2002	2003
Dan Minogue	Servant	1920–25 (player), 1920–25 (coach)	2002	
Charlie Backhouse	Servant	1891–1905 (player), 1894, 1900, 1902 (admin)	2002	
Charlie Callander	Servant	1924–86 (property steward/admin)	2002	
James Charles	Servant	1885–88, 1896 (founder/admin)	2002	
Allan Cooke	Servant	1949–58 (player), 1967–84 (admin)	2006	
Neville Crowe	Servant	1957–67 (player), 1987–93 (admin/president)	2002	
Ray Dunn	Servant	1940–71 (admin/president)	2002	
Barney Herbert	Servant	1909–12, 1914–21 (player), 1932–35, 1939 (admin/president)	2004	
Tony Jewell	Servant	1964–70 (player), 1979–81, 1986–87 (coach), 1994–2003 (admin)	2002	
Barry Richardson	Servant	1965–74 (player), 1977–78 (coach), 1985 (president)	2004	
Graeme Richmond	Servant	1962–86 (admin)	2002	
Alice Wills	Servant	1950–81 (?) (supporter groups/admin)	2002	
Ian Wilson	Servant	1969–85 (admin)	2010	
Brendon Gale	Servant	1990-2001 (player), 2009–24 (admin)	2024	

=== "100 Tiger Treasures" ===
During the centenary season the tigers announced their 100 Tiger Treasures consisting of 10 awards, each with 10 nominees given by the Richmond Football Club in 2008 to celebrate their centenary year of competition in the VFL/AFL. The awards were mostly given to players but also club moments and campaigns. On Saturday, 28 June Richmond held a centenary celebration at Punt Road Oval before the centenary game at the MCG against arch rivals Carlton later that day.

100 Tiger Treasures awardees
Award	Winner	Nominees
Best Individual Performance of the Century	**Kevin Bartlett** "Put his unique stamp on the 1980 finals series, kicking 21 goals as a half-forward in Richmond's three appearances, including seven in the Grand Final massacre of the Magpies, which earned him the Norm Smith Medal for being best afield."	Jack Titus; Doug Strang; Jack Dyer; Roy Wright; Tommy Hafey; Bill Barrot; Michael Green; David Cloke; Matthew Knights
Class of the Century	**Royce Hart** "Thrilled Tiger fans for a decade with his match-winning exploits at centre half-forward. His dominance up forward was a major factor in the Club's run of four premierships from 1967–74. He was an extraordinary mark, a deadeye shot for goal, very courageous and, when the ball hit the ground, he swooped on it like a rover."	Vic Thorp; Bill Morris; Ian Stewart; Kevin Bartlett; Dick Clay; Paul Sproule; Geoff Raines; Dale Weightman; Maurice Rioli
The Strong & the Bold	**Jack Dyer** "No player in the history of the game epitomises his club more than the man known as 'Captain Blood'. He struck fear into the hearts and minds of all opposition players during the 1930s and 40s. Was renowned for his bone-jarring shirtfronts, which left many an opponent bloodied, battered and bruised. He bled for the Tigers and expected his teammates to do likewise."	Basil McCormack; Percy Bentley; Max Oppy; Roger Dean; Martin Bolger; Des Rowe; Matthew Richardson; Kevin Sheedy; Francis Bourke
Defining Moment	**Save Our Skins** "On 15 August 1990, Richmond announced that it needed to raise $1 million by 31 October that year, or it would cease to exist. The Save Our Skins campaign was immediately established to keep the Tigers alive. With Club president Neville Crowe as the figurehead, the SOS campaign did exactly what it set out to achieve, raising the necessary funds to stave off the threat of extinction."	Joining The VFL; The Sash; First Premiership; Eat 'Em Alive; Jack Dyer's Debut; The Theme Song; Move to the MCG; Tommy Hafey's Appointment As Coach; Breaking The Drought In '67
Servant of the Century	**Graeme Richmond** "Graeme Richmond filled a variety of important roles at Tigerland over more than 30 years of devoted service. He was a shrewd, ruthless administrator, who never wasted an opportunity that could benefit his beloved Tigers. His strength lay in his relentless persuasiveness—he was a masterly recruiter and negotiator. And, as a speaker, arguably there have been none finer in league football history."	Charlie Callander; Charlie Priestley; Ray Dunn; Alan Schwab; Allan Cooke; Maurie Fleming; Neville Crowe; Alice Wills; Ian Wilson
Brave Act of the Century	**Francis Bourke** "Bourke collided with teammate Stephen Mount in a tense Round 21, 1980 clash with North Melbourne at Arden Street and had trouble seeing because of the blood streaming down his face. He was subsequently moved from full-back to the opposite end of the ground, where he immediately made his presence felt, taking a diving chest mark and slotting through a crucial goal."	Bill Burns; George Smeaton; Eric Moore; Francis Bourke; Royce Hart; Laurie Fowler; Robert Lamb; Tony Free; Matthew Richardson
Premiership of the Century	**1967** "Richmond, under coach Tommy Hafey, finished the 1967 home-and-away season on top. The Tigers disposed of Carlton by 40 points in the second-semi, then faced up to a star-studded Geelong combination in the Grand Final. At the end of a spectacular contest, Richmond had broken a 24-year premiership drought. Barrot, Brown, Hart, Dean and Bartlett starred, while unsung hero Ronaldson kicked three vital goals."	1920; 1921; 1932; 1934; 1943; 1969; 1973; 1974; 1980
Mark of the Century	**Michael Roach** "The superstar full-forward was a noted high-flyer during his 200-game career at Tigerland, but the mark he took against Hawthorn at the MCG in 1979 was, almost literally, out of this world. 'Roachy' actually rose so high over a huge nest of Hawk players, he ended up making it a chest mark!"	Thomas O'Halloran; Royce Hart; Malcolm Greenslade; Kevin Sheedy; Bryan Wood; Geoff Raines; Michael Mitchell; David Bourke; Matthew Richardson
Goal of the Century	**Michael Mitchell** "The little Tiger excitement machine decided to take off on a bit of a trot during the team's final home-and-away match of the 1990 season, against Sydney at the SCG. After gathering the ball deep in defence, 'Mitch' took one bounce, then another, and then five more (seven in total), before calmly drilling home an incredibly inspirational goal."	John Ronaldson; Bill Barrot; Michael Roach; Kevin Bartlett; Jimmy Jess; Matthew Knights; Joel Bowden; Nathan Brown; Chris Newman
Controversy of the Century	**Windy Hill Brawl** "On 18 May 1974, all hell broke loose at half-time of Richmond's clash with Essendon at Windy Hill as the players were leaving the field . . . A massive brawl erupted, involving players and officials of both clubs. Following a league investigation, several players and officials received suspensions, the heaviest being for Graeme Richmond, who was rubbed out until 31 December and also fined $2000."	Dean/Barassi Incident in 1963; Crowe/Nicholls Incident in 1967 Second-Semi; Barrot/Stewart Swap; Neil Balme's Rampage, 1973 Grand Final; John Pitura Trade; Jewell/Jones Quarter-Time Brawl; 1980's Trade Wars With Collingwood; Alan Bond's Brisbane Plan; Jeff Hogg Trade

=== Captains ===
- Toby Nankervis 2024–today
- Dylan Grimes & Toby Nankervis 2022–2023
- Trent Cotchin 2013–21
- Chris Newman 2009–12
- Kane Johnson 2005–08
- Wayne Campbell 2001–04
- Matthew Knights 1997–00
- Tony Free 1994–96
- Jeff Hogg 1993
- Dale Weightman 1988–92
- Mark Lee 1985–87
- Barry Rowlings 1983–84
- David Cloke 1982
- Bryan Wood 1981
- Bruce Monteath 1980
- Kevin Bartlett 1979
- Kevin Sheedy 1978
- Francis Bourke 1976–77
- Royce Hart 1972–75
- Roger Dean 1968–71
- Fred Swift 1967
- Neville Crowe 1963–66
- Ron Branton 1960–62
- Roy Wright 1958–59
- Des Rowe 1952–57
- Bill Morris 1950–51
- Jack Dyer 1941–49
- Percy Bentley 1932–40
- Maurie Hunter 1931
- Allan Geddes 1930
- Cyril Lilburne 1929
- Allan Geddes 1927–28
- Mel Morris 1926
- Dan Minogue 1920–25
- Bill Thomas 1919
- Clarrie Hall 1918
- Percy Maybury 1917
- Bill Thomas 1914–16
- Hugh James 1913
- Ted Ohlson 1912
- Len Incigneri 1911
- Billy Schmidt 1910
- Dick Condon/John Lawson 1909
- Charlie Pannam Snr 1908

=== Women's Captains ===
- Katie Brennan 2020–25

=== Coaches ===
- Adem Yze 2024–
- Andrew McQualter (interim) 2023 (Rounds 11–23)
- Damien Hardwick 2010–2023 (Rounds 1–10)
- Jade Rawlings 2009 (Rounds 12–22)
- Terry Wallace 2005–09 (Rounds 1–11)
- Danny Frawley 2000–04
- Jeff Gieschen 1997–99
- Robert Walls 1996–97
- John Northey 1993–95
- Allan Jeans 1992
- Kevin Bartlett 1988–91
- Tony Jewell 1986–87
- Paul Sproule 1985
- Mike Patterson 1984
- Francis Bourke 1982–83
- Tony Jewell 1979–81
- Barry Richardson 1977–78
- Verdun Howell 1971
- Tom Hafey 1966–76
- Jack Titus 1965
- Len Smith 1964–65
- Dick Harris 1964
- Des Rowe 1961–63
- Alan McDonald 1957–60
- Max Oppy 1956
- Alby Pannam 1953–55
- Jack Dyer 1941–52
- Percy Bentley 1934–40
- Billy Schmidt 1933
- Frank 'Checker' Hughes 1927–32
- Mel Morris 1926
- Dan Minogue 1920–25
- Norm Clark 1919
- Bernie Nolan 1918
- Percy Maybury 1917
- Charlie Ricketts 1914–16
- Ern Jenkins 1913
- Charlie Pannam Sr 1912
- Len Incigneri 1911
- Alex 'Joker' Hall 1910
- Dick Condon 1908–09

=== Women's Coaches ===
- Tom Hunter 2020
- Ryan Ferguson 2021-25

== Records ==
=== Club records and achievements ===
Premierships
Competition	Team	Wins	Years won
Australian Football League	Seniors	13	1920, 1921, 1932, 1934, 1943, 1967, 1969, 1973, 1974, 1980, 2017, 2019, 2020
Australian Football League	Reserves (1919–1999)	9	1929, 1946, 1954, 1955, 1966, 1971, 1973, 1977, 1997
Australian Football League	Under 19s (1946–1991)	11	1958, 1967, 1968, 1969, 1970, 1973, 1975, 1977, 1980, 1985, 1989
Victorian Football League	Seniors (1885–1907)	2	1902, 1905
Victorian Football League	Reserves (2014–present)	1	2019
Other titles and honours
McClelland Trophy	Seniors	8	1967, 1972, 1973, 1974 1975, 1977, 1982, 2018
Championship of Australia	Seniors	3	1969, 1973, 1974
VFL Night Series	Seniors	1	1962
Lightning Premiership	Seniors	1	1953
Finishing positions
Australian Football League	Minor premiership	9	1920, 1933, 1934, 1943, 1944, 1967, 1974, 1982, 2018
Australian Football League	Grand Finalist	11	1919, 1927, 1928, 1929, 1931, 1933, 1940, 1942, 1944, 1972, 1982
Australian Football League	Wooden spoons	8	1916, 1917, 1960, 1987, 1989, 2004, 2007, 2024

=== Win–loss records ===
Win–loss records
Win–loss record	Played: 2,301	Won: 1,179 Lost: 1,099 Drawn: 23
Highest score	222 (34.18)	vs. St Kilda, Round 16, 1980 at SCG
Lowest score	8 (0.8)	vs. St Kilda, Round 16, 1961 at Junction Oval
Greatest winning margin	168 points	vs. North Melbourne, Round 2, 1931 at Punt Road Oval
Greatest losing margin	157 points	vs. Geelong, Round 6, 2007 at Marvel Stadium
Biggest match attendance	119,165	vs. Carlton, Grand Final, 1969 at MCG
Biggest home & away match attendance	92,436	vs. Collingwood, Round 4, 1977 at MCG

=== Career records ===
Statistic	Record	Player	Seasons inclusive
Most league Best and Fairest awards	2	Roy Wright	1952, 1954
Most seasons as league leading goal kicker	3	Jack Riewoldt	2010, 2012, 2018
Most All-Australian selections	5	Alex Rance	2014, 2015, 2016, 2017, 2018
Most Brownlow Medal votes	191	Dustin Martin	2010–2024
Most club Best & Fairest awards	5	Jack Dyer	1937, 1938, 1939, 1940, 1946
Most club Best & Fairest awards	5	Kevin Bartlett	1967, 1968, 1973, 1974, 1977
Most seasons as club leading goal-kicker	13	Matthew Richardson	1994, 1996–1999, 2001–2008
Games played	403	Kevin Bartlett	1965–1983
Games played as captain	188	Trent Cotchin	2013–2022
Games as coach	274	Damien Hardwick	2010–2023
Goals	970	Jack Titus	1926–1943
Disposals	9151	Kevin Bartlett	1965–1983
Kicks	8293	Kevin Bartlett	1965–1983
Handballs	2736	Dale Weightman	1978–1993
Marks	2270	Matthew Richardson	1993–2009
Tackles	1033	Trent Cotchin	2008- 2023
Hit Outs	4304	Mark Lee	1977–1991
Clearances	1295	Trent Cotchin	2008–2023
Inside 50s	1246	Dustin Martin	2010–2024
Rebound 50s	1006	Joel Bowden	1996–2009
One percenters	1557	Alex Rance	2009–2019
Last updated 28 September 2024

=== Single-game records ===
Single-game records
Statistic	Record	Player	Opponent	Match
Goals	14	Doug Strang	North Melbourne	Round 2, 1931 at Punt Road Oval
Disposals	46	Robert Wiley	Carlton	Round 8, 1980 at MCG
Kicks	38	Kevin Bartlett	Geelong	Round 17, 1974 at Waverley Park
Handballs	28	Nathan Foley	Brisbane	Round 6, 2011 at MCG
Marks	23	Joel Bowden	Port Adelaide	Round 13, 2008 at Football Park
Tackles	14	Jack Graham	Carlton	Round 21, 2019 at MCG
Tackles	14	Shane Tuck	Port Adelaide	Round 10, 2010 at Football Park
Tackles	14	Angus Graham	Port Adelaide	Round 10, 2010 at Football Park
Hit Outs	56	Toby Nankervis	Melbourne	Round 5, 2017 at MCG
Clearances	15	Wayne Campbell	Fremantle	Round 19, 2000 at WACA Ground
Inside 50s	14	Kane Johnson	Western Bulldogs	Round 17, 2003 at Docklands Stadium
Rebound 50s	16	Joel Bowden	Adelaide	Round 8, 2006 at Docklands Stadium
One percenters	19	Alex Rance	Geelong	Round 21, 2016 at MCG

=== Single-season records ===
Single-season records
Statistic	Record	Player	Season
Goals	112	Michael Roach	1980
Disposals	744	Dustin Martin	2017
Kicks	634	Kevin Bartlett	1973
Handballs	320	Craig Lambert	1991
Marks	224	Mike Green	1969
Tackles	139	Trent Cotchin	2017
Hit Outs	711	Mark Lee	1984
Clearances	160	Dustin Martin	2017
Inside 50s	159	Nick Daffy	1998
Rebound 50s	190	Joel Bowden	2006
One percenters	242	Alex Rance	2017

== Individual awards ==
Brownlow (VFL/AFL Best & Fairest)

- Stan Judkins – 1930
- Bill Morris – 1948
- Roy Wright – 1952, 1954
- Ian Stewart – 1971
- Trent Cotchin – 2012
- Dustin Martin – 2017

Coleman (VFL/AFL leading goalkicker)

- George Bayliss – 1920
- Jack Titus – 1940
- Dick Harris – 1943
- Michael Roach – 1980, 1981
- Jack Riewoldt – 2010, 2012, 2018

Norm Smith (Grand Final Best & Fairest)
First Awarded 1979

- Kevin Bartlett – 1980
- Maurice Rioli – 1982
- Dustin Martin – 2017, 2019, 2020

AFL Rising Star
First Awarded 1993

- Brett Deledio – 2005

Mark of the Year

- Michael Roach – 1979
- Geoff Raines – 1982
- Michael Mitchell – 1990
- Shai Bolton – 2021

Goal of the Year

- Geoff Raines – 1984
- Michael Mitchell – 1990
- Daniel Rioli – 2017
- Jack Higgins – 2018

All-Australian selection
First Awarded 1953

- Des Rowe – 1956
- Roy Wright – 1956
- Neville Crowe – 1966
- Royce Hart – 1969
- David Cloke – 1979
- Bruce Monteath – 1979
- Michael Roach – 1979
- Jim Jess – 1980
- Geoff Raines – 1980
- Mark Lee – 1980, 1983, 1985
- Maurice Rioli – 1983, 1986
- Dale Weightman – 1985, 1986, 1988
- Wayne Campbell – 1995, 1999
- Matthew Richardson – 1996, 1999, 2008
- Matthew Knights – 1998
- Andrew Kellaway – 2000
- Darren Gaspar – 2000, 2001
- Brad Ottens – 2001
- Joel Bowden – 2005, 2006
- Jack Riewoldt – 2010, 2015, 2018
- Trent Cotchin – 2012
- Brett Deledio – 2012, 2015
- Alex Rance – 2014, 2015, 2016, 2017 (captain), 2018
- Dustin Martin – 2016, 2017, 2018, 2020
- Shane Edwards - 2018
- Dylan Grimes - 2019
- Bachar Houli - 2019
- Shai Bolton - 2022

AFL Coaches Association Champion Player of the Year

- Trent Cotchin – 2012
- Dustin Martin – 2017

AFL Coaches Association Coach of the Year

- Damien Hardwick – 2017

AFL Players Association Most Valuable Player

- Dustin Martin – 2017

International Rules Series representatives
Commenced 1998

- Matthew Richardson – 1996, 1999, 2008
- Wayne Campbell – 1998, 1999, 2000
- Andrew Kellaway – 2000, 2002
- Darren Gaspar – 2001
- Brad Ottens – 2001
- Joel Bowden – 2001, 2004
- Nathan Brown – 2003, 2004
- Brett Deledio – 2005
- Chris Newman – 2005
- Andrew Raines – 2006
- Jack Riewoldt – 2010
- Jake King – 2011
- Robin Nahas – 2011

22 Under 22 team selection

- Alex Rance – 2012
- Dustin Martin – 2012, 2013
- Trent Cotchin – 2012
- Brandon Ellis – 2013, 2014, 2015
- Daniel Rioli – 2017
- Jayden Short – 2018
- Dan Butler – 2018
- Sydney Stack – 2019
- Liam Baker – 2020
- Noah Balta – 2020
- Shai Bolton – 2021

Club Best & Fairest

See Jack Dyer Medal

Club leading goalkicker

See Michael Roach Medal

== Current squad ==
Richmond Football Club · AFL personnel
Playing list		Inactive list	Coaching staff
1 Nick Vlastuin; 2 Jacob Hopper; 4 Sam Lalor; 5 Jack Ross; 6 Sam Banks; 7 Rhyan Mansell; 8 Jonty Faull; 10 Taj Hotton; 11 Luke Trainor; 12 Ben Miller; 13 Hugo Ralphsmith; 14 Tim Taranto (vc); 15 Jayden Short; 16 Josh Smillie; 17 Maurice Rioli Jr.; 18 Josh Gibcus; 19 Tom Lynch; 21 Noah Balta; 22 Sam Cumming	23 Judson Clarke; 24 Sam Grlj; 25 Toby Nankervis (c); 26 Zane Peucker; 27 Noah Roberts-Thomson; 28 Kane McAuliffe; 29 Jasper Alger; 30 Tom Brown; 33 Patrick Retschko; 34 Harry Armstrong; 38 Tom Sims; 41 Kye Annand*; 42 Mykelti Lefau; 44 Seth Campbell; 45 Tom Burton*; 46 Patrick Carr*; 50 Campbell Gray*; Kieren Briggs; Nathan O'Driscoll		Senior coach: Adem Yze; Assistant coaches: Jake Batchelor (back line); Sam Lonergan (midfield); Jack Ziebell (midfield); Blake Caracella (forward line); Ivan Maric (ruck); Taylor Duryea (development – back line); Luke Breust (development – forward line); Legend: (c) captain; (vc) vice-captain; * rookie; Updated: 15 November 2026; Sources: Players, coaches

== Reserves team ==
Richmond Football Club

Names
- Full name: Richmond Football Club Limited
- Former name(s): Richmond Juniors (until 1924); Richmond Second Eighteen
- Nickname(s): Tigers, Tiges
- Former nickname: Cubs

Club details
- Founded: 1902, re-established in 2014 (as a reserves side)
- Competition: Victorian Football League
- Coach: Jack Madgen
- Captain: Lachlan Street
- Premierships: VFL/AFL reserves (10): 1929; 1946; 1954; 1955; 1966; 1971; 1973; 1977; 1997; VFL (1): 2019
- Ground: Punt Road Oval (2,800)

Uniforms
Home

The Richmonds reserves are the reserves team of the club. The latest iteration of the side was created in 2013, and has competed in the Victorian Football League (VFL) since 2014.

=== History ===
Richmond City and West Richmond amalgamated on 2 April 1902 to become Richmond Junior League Football Club, with the Richmond Football Club offering the new club free use of its ground and facilities. The side, which operated independently from the senior club until 1959, first competed in the Victorian Junior Football Association before joining the Victorian Junior Football League in 1919.

The Richmond juniors recorded its first premiership in 1929. In the following 68 years, Richmond went on to win a further eight premierships in reserve-grade football.

The Richmond reserves joined the Victorian Football League competition after the AFL reserves was disbanded, finishing 17th at the end of their first season in 2000.

In 2001, the reserves side was dissolved and the club entered a reserves affiliation with the Coburg Football Club. This arrangement lasted from 2001 until 2013.

Richmond ended the affiliation at the end of 2013, seeking to re-establish a more direct developmental structure by operating a stand-alone reserves team. The reformed Richmond reserves team has played in the VFL since 2014, playing its home games at the Punt Road Oval, with many staged as curtain raisers to the club's senior home and away games at the nearby Melbourne Cricket Ground. The team is made up of a combination of senior listed AFL players, rookie listed players and VFL exclusive contracted players.

=== Premierships ===
Year	Competition	Opponent	Score	Venue
1929	VFL reserves	Geelong	12.8 (80) – 7.15 (57)	MCG
1946	VFL reserves	Fitzroy	7.15 (57) – 7.14 (56)	MCG
1954	VFL reserves	Melbourne	10.20 (80) – 4.9 (33)	MCG
1955	VFL reserves	Footscray	13.18 (96) – 9.12 (66)	MCG
1966	VFL reserves	Collingwood	14.11 (95) – 13.12 (90)	MCG
1971	VFL reserves	Essendon	14.14 (98) – 8.18 (66)	MCG
1973	VFL reserves	Geelong	17.18 (120) – 8.12 (60)	MCG
1977	VFL reserves	Footscray	19.18 (132) – 10.15 (75)	MCG
1997	AFL reserves	Hawthorn	17.12 (114) – 10.10 (70)	MCG
2019	VFL	Williamstown	8.10 (58) – 7.13 (55)	Ikon Park

=== Seasons ===
Premiers	Grand Finalist	Minor premiers	Finals appearance	Wildcard Round appearance	Wooden spoon	League leading goalkicker	League best and fairest

Year	League	Finish	W	L	D	Coach	Captain	Guinane Medal	Leading goalkicker	Goals	Ref
2014	VFL	12th	6	11	1	Tim Clarke	Ross Young	Ross Young	Matthew Mcdonough	11	
2015	VFL	13th	5	12	0	Tim Clarke	Jaryd Cachia	Matt Dea	Liam McBean	42	
2016	VFL	9th	9	9	0	Craig McRae	Sam Darley	Adam Marcon	Adam Marcon	9	
2017	VFL	5th	11	7	0	Craig McRae	Sam Darley	Anthony Miles	Ben Lennon	45	
2018	VFL	1st	14	4	0	Craig McRae	Steven Morris	Anthony Miles	Tyson Stengle	33	
2019	VFL	1st	16	2	0	Craig McRae	Steven Morris	Daniel Coffield	Jacob Townsend, Dan Butler, and Mabior Chol	21	
2020	VFL	(No season)						(No season)			
2021	VFL	11th	4	5	1	Xavier Clarke (from July)	Steven Morris	Will Martyn	Samson Ryan	15	
2022	VFL	9th	11	7	0	Steven Morris	Lachlan Street	Jake Aarts	Noah Cumberland	24	
2023	VFL	9th	10	7	1	Steven Morris	Lachlan Street	James Trezise	Kaelan Bradtke	24	
2024	VFL	9th	10	8	0	Steven Morris	Lachlan Street	Tom Brindley, Sam Davidson, and Lachlan Wilson	Sam Davidson	26	

== Women's teams ==
The Richmond Football Club fields a team in the premier national league for women, the AFL Women's competition. The club entered the league in 2020. For two seasons in 2018 and 2019, the club also fielded a team in the state-league level VFL Women's competition.

The program, including development pathways, is presently overseen by the women's football operations manager, Kate Sheahan.

=== History ===
Richmond has a thin history with women's football, with the club connected to just two women's matches in the 20th century. The first occurred in 1923, with a team dubbed the "Tigresses" playing off against the club's junior men's team (Cubs) as a fundraiser for a VFL team's interstate trip. As was the case with women versus men charity matches in that era, the men's team competed in the match in full fancy dress attire and were hobbled at the knees. In what was a non-serious affair the women's side (9.14 (68)) defeated the Cubs side (0.1 (1)). In August 1933, however, an all women's match was held between teams representing the suburbs of Richmond and Carlton in a charity match. While the Carlton team was associated with the club itself, Richmond did not pair with the side that played under its moniker. The match, played at Carlton's home ground, Princes Park, drew an estimated crowd of 10,000 and raised funds as part of a VFL bye-week carnival for the Royal Melbourne Hospital.

=== AFL Women's team ===
In 2016, Richmond was among 13 AFL clubs to bid for licenses to compete in the soon to be formed AFL Women's competition. The club was one of five to miss out, instead being awarded provisional licenses guaranteeing access in later expansions. The following year they would again bid, this time winning the right to entry into the competition's fourth season, to be held in 2020. The club's first player signing came in the April 2019 expansion signing period, securing former Western Bulldogs captain Katie Brennan, who would go on to captain the club in its first season in the league.

==== Current squad ====
Richmond Football Club · AFL Women's personnel
Playing list		Inactive list	Coaching staff
2 Emelia Yassir; 3 Katie Brennan; 4 Monique Conti (vc); 6 Sierra Grieves; 8 Montana Beruldsen; 9 Caitlin Greiser; 10 Montana McKinnon; 11 Isabel Bacon; 12 Olivia Wolmarans; 13 Aoibhin Cleary*; 14 Poppy Kelly; 15 Rebecca Miller; 16 Laura McClelland; 18 Libby Graham	20 Beth Lynch; 21 Dana East; 22 Ellie McKenzie (c); 24 Charli Wicksteed; 26 Ana Mulholland; 27 Georgia Stubs; 28 Gabby Seymour (c); 30 Ally Dallaway; 32 Zoe Hargreaves; 33 Mckenzie Ford; 34 Baia Pugh; 35 Maddie Shevlin; 37 Fina Dethlefsen		Senior coach: Jarrad Donders; Assistant coaches: Brett Gourley (senior assistant/midfield); Tom Chitsos (back line); Brendan Fevola (forward line); Legend: (c) captain; (vc) vice-captain; * rookie; Updated: 15 November 2026; Sources: Players, coaches

==== Season summaries ====
Richmond AFLW honour roll
Season	Ladder	W–L–D	Finals	Coach	Captain(s)	Best and fairest	Leading goalkicker
2020	14th ^	0–6–0	DNQ	Tom Hunter	Katie Brennan	Monique Conti	Courtney Wakefield (4)
2021	10th	3–6–0	DNQ	Ryan Ferguson	Katie Brennan	Monique Conti	Katie Brennan (14)
2022 (S6)	11th	3–7–0	DNQ	Ryan Ferguson	Katie Brennan	Monique Conti	Katie Brennan (14)
2022 (S7)	4th	7–2–1	Semi-finalists	Ryan Ferguson	Katie Brennan	Monique Conti	Courtney Wakefield (14)
2023	10th	5–5–0	DNQ	Ryan Ferguson	Katie Brennan	Monique Conti	Katie Brennan (14)
2024	7th	6-4-1	Elimination final	Ryan Ferguson	Katie Brennan	Monique Conti	Katie Brennan (13)
2025	16th	2-10-0	DNQ	Ryan Ferguson	Katie Brennan	Monique Conti	Caitlin Greiser (10)

^ Denotes the ladder was split into two conferences. Figure refers to the club's overall finishing in the home-and-away season.

=== VFL Women's team ===
In October 2017, Richmond was granted a license to field a team in the 2018 VFL Women's season. They were one of 13 clubs in the competition that season, including all 10 Victorian-based AFL clubs. The league operated in the winter season (separately to the AFLW competition). Former men's VFL assistant coach Tom Hunter was named the team's head coach in November 2017 and served in the role over the 2018 and 2019 seasons. Jess Kennedy was named the team's inaugural captain in May 2018. After two seasons in the competition and following the cancellation of the 2020 season due to the impacts of the COVID-19 pandemic, the club withdrew from the competition and entered into an alignment with the Port Melbourne Football Club.

==== Season summaries ====
Richmond VFLW honour roll
Season	Final position	Coach	Captain	Best and fairest	Leading goal kicker
2018	12th	Tom Hunter	Jessica Kennedy	Jessica Kennedy	Kate Dixon (9)
2019	4th	Tom Hunter	Jessica Kennedy	Monique Conti	Tayla Stahl (19)

== Wheelchair football ==
Richmond has had a team compete in the Victorian Wheelchair Football League since its inception in 2018. The team were runners up in 2018 before winning the league premiership in 2019. After a two-year hiatus due to the suspension of the 2020 & 2021 seasons as a result of the COVID pandemic, Richmond won their second league premiership as well as the development league premiership in 2022.

Wheelchair Premierships (3)
Year	Competition	Opponent	Score	Venue
2019	Victorian Wheelchair Football League	Collingwood	9.7 (61) – 7.5 (47)	Boroondara Sports Complex
2022	Victorian Wheelchair Football League	Essendon	17.8 (110) – 12.8 (80)	Melbourne Sports and Aquatic Centre
2024	Victorian Wheelchair Football League	Collingwood	13.4 (82) – 9.5 (59)	Melbourne Sports and Aquatic Centre

Wheelchair Development League Premierships (1)
Year	Competition	Opponent	Score	Venue
2022	VWFL Development League	Essendon	12.4 (76) – 9.4 (58)	Melbourne Sports and Aquatic Centre

== See also ==
- List of Richmond Football Club seasons
- List of Richmond Football Club players
- List of Richmond Football Club coaches
