= Angus Graham (footballer) =

Australian rules footballer

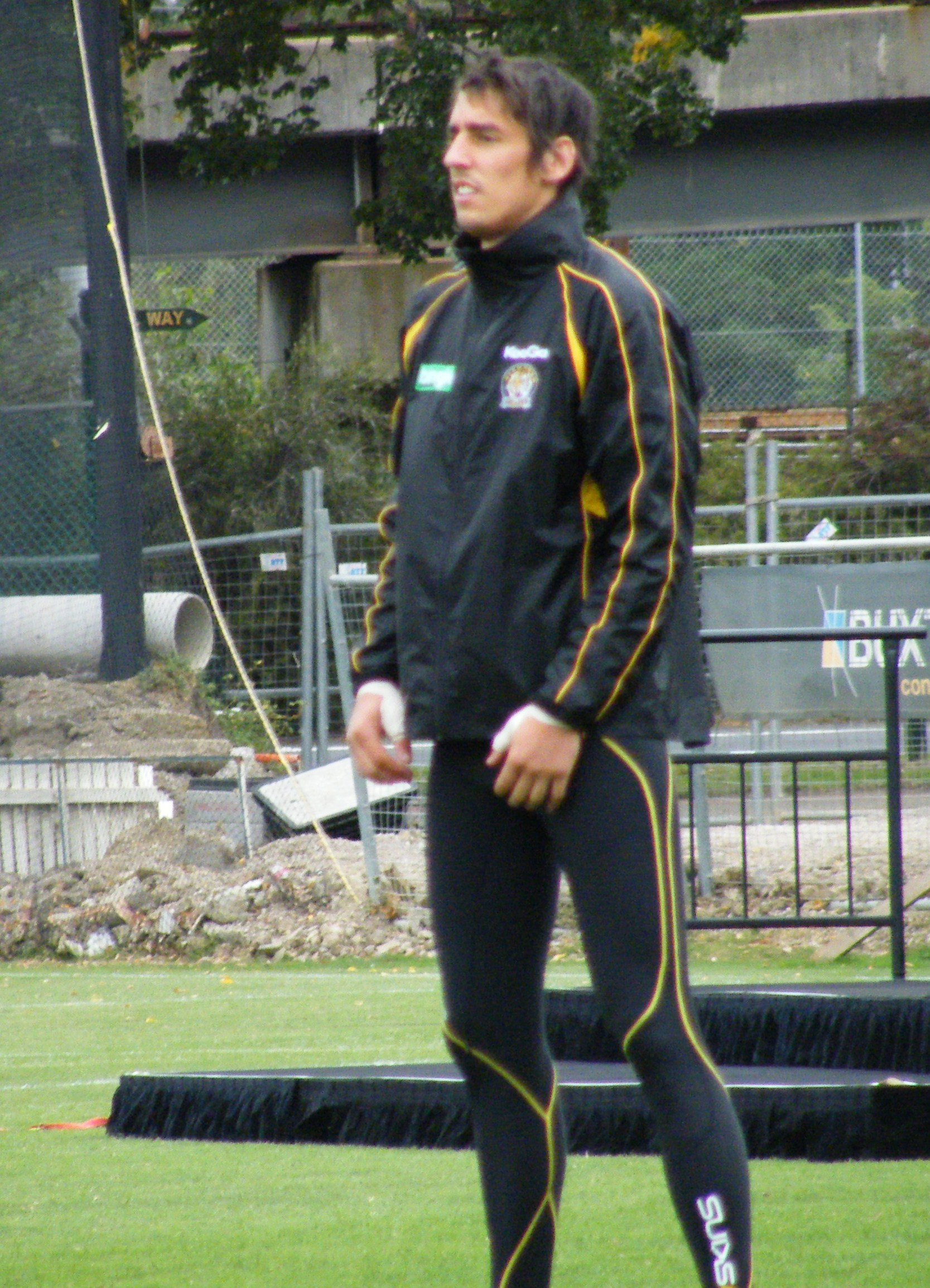

Personal information
- Full name: Angus Graham
- Born: 16 April 1987 (age 39); King Island, Tasmania
- Original team: Tassie Mariners
- Draft: No. 5, 2006 Rookie Draft
- Height: 201 cm (6 ft 7 in)
- Weight: 106 kg (234 lb)
- Position: Ruckman

Playing career^{1}
| Years | Club | Games (Goals) |
| 2007–2012 | Richmond | 48 (18) |
| 2013–2014 | Adelaide | 0 (0) |
- ^{1} Playing statistics correct to the end of 2014.

Angus Graham (born 16 April 1987) is a former professional Australian rules footballer who played in the Australian Football League (AFL).

He made his debut in late 2007 with the Richmond Football Club and played two games that season. He did not play in the 2008 season, but he returned to the side in 2009 and enjoyed a solid run of form in the early rounds of the season. His first senior goal came against Sydney in round 6, 2009; he went on to kick two goals in that match.

On 19 October 2012, Graham signed with Adelaide Football Club for two years but did not play in 2013 or in 2014. On 6 September 2014, Adelaide announced that his contract would not be renewed.
