= Martin Bolger =

Australian rules footballer, born 1906

Personal information
- Full name: Martin Joseph Bolger
- Born: 19 August 1906; Hawthorn, Victoria
- Died: 28 July 1991 (aged 84)
- Original team: Cathedral YCW/Melbourne Reserves
- Height: 177 cm (5 ft 10 in)
- Weight: 76 kg (168 lb)

Playing career^{1}
Years	Club	Games (Goals)
1930–1939	Richmond	185 (2)
- ^{1} Playing statistics correct to the end of 1939.

Career highlights
- Richmond Premiership Player 1932, 1934; Richmond - Hall of Fame - inducted 2005

Martin Joseph Bolger (19 August 1906 – 28 July 1991) was an Australian rules footballer who played in the VFL between 1930 and 1939 for the Richmond Football Club.

A member of the Tigers' legendary "Three Musketeers" backline of Bolger, Sheahan and O'Neill, he played in the 1929 Seconds premiership side as well as in four straight senior Grand Finals from 1931 to 1934, winning the premiership in 1932 and 1934.

Bolger was awarded Life Membership in 1939.

Later serving as a committeeman and vice president of the club, his service to the Richmond Football Club exceeded 50 years.
