= Bryan Wood =

Australian rules footballer (born 1954)

Personal information
- Born: 3 April 1954 (age 72)
- Original teams: Melbourne High School / Blackburn Juniors
- Height: 185 cm (6 ft 1 in)
- Weight: 85 kg (187 lb)

Playing career^{1}
Years	Club	Games (Goals)
1972–1982	Richmond	209 (85)
1983–1986	Essendon	44 (12)
Total		253 (97)
- ^{1} Playing statistics correct to the end of 1986.

Career highlights
- Richmond Premiership Player 1973, 1974, 1980; Richmond Captain 1981; Essendon Premiership Player 1985; Interstate Games:- 2; Richmond – Hall of Fame – inducted 2006

Bryan Wood (born 3 April 1954) is a former Australian rules football player who played in the Victorian Football League (VFL) between 1972 and 1982 for the Richmond Football Club and between 1983 and 1986 for the Essendon Football Club.
