= Michael Green (Australian rules footballer) =

Australian rules footballer

Personal information
- Born: 14 May 1948 (age 78)
- Original teams: Xavier College; Richmond Reserves
- Height: 193 cm (6 ft 4 in)
- Weight: 94.5 kg (208 lb)

Playing career^{1}
Years	Club	Games (Goals)
1966–1975	Richmond	146 (83)
- ^{1} Playing statistics correct to the end of 1975.

Career highlights
- Richmond Premiership player: 1967, 1969, 1973, 1974; Richmond Team of the Century; Richmond Hall of Fame: 2004

Michael Green (born 14 May 1948) is a former Australian rules football player who played in the Victorian Football League (VFL) between 1966 and 1971 and then again between 1973 and 1975 for the Richmond Football Club.

The demands of a law career, which caused him to retire temporarily in 1972, before returning and playing in back to back flags in 1973 and 1974.

Green is now well known in the Melbourne legal community. From 1996 until his retirement in 2018, he ran Greens List, one of the Victorian bar's largest barristers' clerk services.

Green is grandfather to current GWS AFL player Tom Green. He is also a relation of current AFL players Xavier, Willem and Zane Duursma, as well as AFLW player Yasmin Duuursma. His brother in law is St Kilda premiership player Brian Sierakowski.

His sons Christopher, Richard and Matthew were talented school footballers, all playing at First XVIII level for Xavier College.
