= WA Wheelchair Football League =

Aussie rules wheelchair football

West Australian Wheelchair Football League
- Current season, competition or edition: 2024 WAWFL Season
- Sport: Australian Rules Wheelchair Football
- Founded: 6 October 2021; 4 years ago
- No. of teams: 6
- Headquarters: Tuart Hill, Western Australia
- Region: Western Australia
- Current premiers: Perth (2nd Premiership)
- Most premierships: Perth (2 premierships)
- Website: wa-wheelchair-football-league

The West Australian Wheelchair Football League (WAWFL) is a semi-professional competition of Australian Rules Football. The WAWFL competition currently consists of 6 teams spread over the Perth Metropolitan Area.

The WAWFL premiership season currently consists of a 10-match regular (or home and away) season, which runs from the end of September to mid-November.
