= Geoff Raines =

Australian rules footballer (born 1956)

Personal information
- Born: 10 August 1956 (age 70)
- Original team: Swan Hill
- Height: 180 cm (5 ft 11 in)
- Weight: 78 kg (172 lb)

Playing career^{1}
Years	Club	Games (Goals)
1976–1982	Richmond	134 (55)
1983–1985	Collingwood	45 (21)
1986	Essendon	16 (5)
1987–1989	Brisbane Bears	59 (20)
Total		254 (101)
- ^{1} Playing statistics correct to the end of 1989.

Career highlights
- Richmond Premiership Player 1980; Richmond Best and Fairest 1978, 1980, 1981; Interstate Games:- 11; All Australian 1980, 1985; Richmond - Team of the Century; Richmond - Hall of Fame - inducted 2008

Geoff Raines (born 10 August 1956) is a former Australian rules football player who played in the VFL between 1976 and 1982 for the Richmond Football Club, between 1983 and 1985 for the Collingwood Football Club, in 1986 for the Essendon Football Club and between 1987 and 1989 for the Brisbane Bears Football Club.

His numerous football achievements include a VFL premiership medallion (1980), three Jack Dyer medals (Richmond best and fairest), two-time All-Australian selection, and an induction to the Richmond Hall of Fame and Team of the Century. Controversially, Raines received no Brownlow votes in Richmond's 1980 premiership year despite being judged by Richmond to be the club's best player. Raines maintains that he was the victim of a conspiracy to deprive him of votes, a charge which was denied by the former chief of the AFL Umpires Association.

Raines's son Andrew Raines played in the Australian Football League for Richmond, Brisbane and Gold Coast.

== Sources ==
- Hogan P: The Tigers Of Old, Richmond FC, Melbourne 1996
