= List of Richmond Football Club seasons =

The Richmond Football Club are a professional Australian rules football team based in Richmond, Victoria that competes in the Australian Football League (AFL). From its founding in 1885 until 1907 Richmond competed in the Victorian Football Association (VFA). It left the VFA to join the VFL in 1908 and has competed in each season since. Richmond have won two VFA/VFL premierships and thirteen VFL/AFL premierships.

== Men's seasons ==
=== Seniors ===
VFL/AFL premiers
Grand finalist
Minor premiers

H&A	Home and away season finishing position
Fin.	Finals finishing position
W	Number of home and away season wins
L	Number of home and away season losses
D	Number of home and away season draws
Fin. matches	Finals matches played
B&F	Best and fairest winner
Goal	Leading goalkicker
Italics	Season in progress
Ref.	Reference

Season	H&A	Fin.	W	L	D	Finals matches	Captain	Coach	B&F	Leading goalkicker	Ref
1885			4	12	2	–	George Smith		–	William Wells, Jack Conlon	
1886			5	16	1	–	Tom Graham, Fred Wookey, George Smith		–	Alfred Hill	
1887			8	8	3	–	Jack Stewart		–	Alfred Hill	
1888	5th		11	8	2	–	George Smith			Billy Brown	
1889	8th		7	11	1	–	Patrick O’Laughlin			Billy Brown	
1890	11th		3	14	1	–	Ed ‘Ned’ Burwood			Alfred Elder	
1891	12th		2	14	3	–	Tom Graham		–	Alfred Elder	
1892	8th		8	10	1	–	Arthur “Bolivar” Powell		–	George Sparrow	
1893	12th		2	14	4	–	Charles Backhouse		–	George Sparrow	
1894	11th		4	13	1	–	George Sparrow		–	Fred Alsop	
1895	12th		4	11	3	–	George Sparrow, Dick Kelly		–	Fred Alsop	
1896	12th		3	15	–	–	Dick Kelly		–	Dick Kelly	
1897	6th		2	17	1	–	Dick Kelly, Billy Clarke		–	Alfred Elder	
1898	4th		8	9	–	–	Billy Clarke		–	Alfred Elder	
1899	6th		8	13	–	–	Billy Clarke, Tom Watson		–	Hector Milne	
1900	3rd		10	6	–	–	Tom Watson		–	George Backhouse	
1901	2nd		12	4	–	–	Alec Edmond		–	James Douglas	
1902	1st		15	1	–	No Finals. Was awarded Premiership for finishing top of the ladder	Alec Edmond		–	Roland Duncan	
1903	1st	2nd	16	2	–	Lost Semi-Final to Footscray 29–65	Alec Edmond		–	Jack Main	
1903	1st	2nd	16	2	–	Lost Grand Final to North Melbourne 27–48	Alec Edmond		–	Jack Main	
1904	1st	2nd	15	2	1	Lost Semi-Final to North Melbourne 39–41	Alec Edmond	Charles Taylor	–	Jack Hutchinson	
1904	1st	2nd	15	2	1	Forfeited Grand Final to North Melbourne	Alec Edmond	Charles Taylor	–	Jack Hutchinson	
1905	2nd	1st	14	4	–	Won Semi-Final against Port Melbourne 74–48	Alec Edmond, Arthur Cleghorn		–	Dick Knell	
1905	2nd	1st	14	4	–	Won Final against North Melbourne 28–48	Alec Edmond, Arthur Cleghorn		–	Dick Knell	
1905	2nd	1st	14	4	–	Won Grand Final against North Melbourne 36–61	Alec Edmond, Arthur Cleghorn		–	Dick Knell	
1906	2nd	3rd	14	4	–	Lost Semi-Final to Footscray 41–50	Arthur Cleghorn, Alec Edmond		–	Jack Hutchinson	
1907	2nd	3rd	14	4	–	Lost Semi-Final to West Melbourne 61–37	Charlie Pannam	Charlie Pannam	–	Jack Hutchinson	
1908	9th	–	6	12	–	–	Charlie Pannam	Dick Condon	–	Bill Bourke	
1909	8th	–	6	12	–	–	Dick Condon & John Lawson	Dick Condon	–	Bill Bourke	
1910	7th	–	7	10	1	–	Billy Schmidt	Alex Hall	–	Michael Maguire	
1911	8th	–	7	11	–	–	Len Incigneri	Len Incigneri	–	Michael Maguire	
1912	9th	–	3	15	–	–	Ted Ohlson	Charlie Pannam	–	Ted Keggin	
1913	7th	–	6	12	–	–	Hugh James	Ern Jenkins	–	Percy Martyn	
1914	8th	–	8	10	–	–	Charlie Ricketts & Bill Thomas	Charlie Ricketts	–	Clarrie Hall	
1915	6th	–	5	11	–	–	Bill Thomas	Charlie Ricketts	–	Clarrie Hall	
1916	3rd	4th	5	7		Lost Semi-Final to Carlton 75–72	Bill Thomas	Charlie Ricketts	–	Percy Martini	
1917	6th	–	3	11	1	–	Percy Maybury	Percy Maybury	–	Charlie Fehring	
1918	6th	–	5	9	–	–	Clarrie Hall	Bernie Nolan	–	Donald Don	
1919	4th	2nd	10	6	–	Won Semi-Final against South Melbourne 73–59	Bill Thomas	Norm Clark	–	Donald Don	
1919	4th	2nd	10	6	–	Won Preliminary Final against Collingwood 74–45	Bill Thomas	Norm Clark	–	Donald Don	
1919	4th	2nd	10	6	–	Lost Grand Final to Collingwood 78–53	Bill Thomas	Norm Clark	–	Donald Don	
1920	1st	1st	14	2	–	Lost Semi-Final against Carlton 53–30	Dan Minogue	Dan Minogue	–	George Bayliss	
1920	1st	1st	14	2	–	Won Grand Final against Collingwood 52–35	Dan Minogue	Dan Minogue	–	George Bayliss	
1921	2nd	1st	12	4	–	Won Semi-Final against Geelong 115–54	Dan Minogue	Dan Minogue	–	George Bayliss	
1921	2nd	1st	12	4	–	Won Preliminary Final against Carlton 67–59	Dan Minogue	Dan Minogue	–	George Bayliss	
1921	2nd	1st	12	4	–	Won Grand Final against Carlton 36–32	Dan Minogue	Dan Minogue	–	George Bayliss	
1922	5th	–	7	9	–	–	Dan Minogue	Dan Minogue	–	George Bayliss	
1923	8th	–	4	12	–	–	Dan Minogue	Dan Minogue	–	Don Fraser, Sr.	
1924	4th	4th	10	6	–	Won Semi-Final against South Melbourne 85–57; Lost Semi-Final to Fitzroy 76–56; Won Semi-Final against Essendon 67–47	Dan Minogue	Dan Minogue	–	Mel Morris	
1925	7th	–	6	10	1	–	Dan Minogue	Dan Minogue	–	Mel Morris	
1926	7th	–	9	9	–	–	Mel Morris	Mel Morris	–	Dave Lynch	
1927	2nd	2nd	14	4	–	Won Semi-Final against Carlton 82–76	Allan Geddes	Frank 'Checker' Hughes	Basil McCormack	Jack Baggott	
1927	2nd	2nd	14	4	–	Lost Grand Final to Collingwood 25–13	Allan Geddes	Frank 'Checker' Hughes	Basil McCormack	Jack Baggott	
1928	2nd	2nd	14	4	–	Won Semi-Final against Carlton 117–64	Allan Geddes	Frank 'Checker' Hughes	Basil McCormack	Jack Baggott	
1928	2nd	2nd	14	4	–	Lost Grand Final to Collingwood 96–63	Allan Geddes	Frank 'Checker' Hughes	Basil McCormack	Jack Baggott	
1929	3rd	2nd	12	5	1	Won Semi-Final against Collingwood 123–61	Cyril Lilburne	Frank 'Checker' Hughes	Jack Titus	Jack Titus	
1929	3rd	2nd	12	5	1	Won Preliminary Final against Carlton 97–91	Cyril Lilburne	Frank 'Checker' Hughes	Jack Titus	Jack Titus	
1929	3rd	2nd	12	5	1	Lost Grand Final to Collingwood 79–50	Cyril Lilburne	Frank 'Checker' Hughes	Jack Titus	Jack Titus	
1930	3rd	4th	11	7	–	Lost Semi-Final to Collingwood 94–91	Allan Geddes	Frank 'Checker' Hughes	–	Jack Titus	
1931	2nd	2nd	15	3	–	Won Semi-Final against Geelong 99–66	Maurie Hunter	Frank 'Checker' Hughes	–	Doug Strang	
1931	2nd	2nd	15	3	–	Lost Grand Final to Geelong 68–48	Maurie Hunter	Frank 'Checker' Hughes	–	Doug Strang	
1932	2nd	1st	14	3	1	Won Semi-Final against Carlton 124–99	Percy Bentley	Frank 'Checker' Hughes	–	Doug Strang	
1932	2nd	1st	14	3	1	Won Grand Final against Carlton 92–83	Percy Bentley	Frank 'Checker' Hughes	–	Doug Strang	
1933	1st	2nd	15	3	–	Lost Semi-Final to South Melbourne 95–77	Percy Bentley	Billy Schmidt	–	Doug Strang	
1933	1st	2nd	15	3	–	Won Preliminary Final against Geelong 83–74	Percy Bentley	Billy Schmidt	–	Doug Strang	
1933	1st	2nd	15	3	–	Lost Grand Final to South Melbourne 71–29	Percy Bentley	Billy Schmidt	–	Doug Strang	
1934	1st	1st	15	3	–	Won Semi-Final against Geelong 134–50	Percy Bentley	Percy Bentley	–	Jack Titus	
1934	1st	1st	15	3	–	Won Grand Final against South Melbourne 128–89	Percy Bentley	Percy Bentley	–	Jack Titus	
1935	4th	3rd	12	6	–	Won Semi-Final against Carlton 125–104	Percy Bentley	Percy Bentley	Ray Martin	Jack Titus	
1935	4th	3rd	12	6	–	Lost Preliminary Final to Collingwood 94–66	Percy Bentley	Percy Bentley	Ray Martin	Jack Titus	
1936	6th	–	10	8	–	–	Percy Bentley	Percy Bentley	–	Jack Titus	
1937	4th	4th	11	6	1	Lost Semi-Final to Collingwood 130–69	Percy Bentley	Percy Bentley & Jack Titus	Jack Dyer	Jack Titus & Dick Harris	
1938	6th	–	10	8	–	–	Percy Bentley	Percy Bentley	Jack Dyer	Jack Titus	
1939	3rd	4th	13	5	–	Lost Semi-Final to St Kilda 72–42	Percy Bentley	Percy Bentley	Jack Dyer	Jack Titus	
1940	2nd	2nd	12	6	–	Won Semi-Final against Melbourne 107–101	Percy Bentley	Percy Bentley	Jack Dyer	Jack Titus	
1940	2nd	2nd	12	6	–	Lost Grand Final to Melbourne 107–68	Percy Bentley	Percy Bentley	Jack Dyer	Jack Titus	
1941	3rd	4th	14	4	–	Lost Semi-Final to Essendon 135–81	Jack Dyer	Jack Dyer & Jack Titus	Jack Titus	Jack Titus	
1942	2nd	2nd	11	4	–	Won Semi-Final against Essendon 78–56	Jack Dyer	Jack Dyer	Leo Merrett	Jack Titus	
1942	2nd	2nd	11	4	–	Lost Grand Final to Essendon 132–79	Jack Dyer	Jack Dyer	Leo Merrett	Jack Titus	
1943	1st	1st	10	5	–	Lost Semi-Final to Essendon 94–71	Jack Dyer	Jack Dyer	Ron Durham	Dick Harris	
1943	1st	1st	10	5	–	Won Preliminary Final against Fitzroy 86–61	Jack Dyer	Jack Dyer	Ron Durham	Dick Harris	
1943	1st	1st	10	5	–	Won Grand Final against Essendon 86–81	Jack Dyer	Jack Dyer	Ron Durham	Dick Harris	
1944	1st	2nd	13	4	1	Lost Semi-Final to Fitzroy 81–70	Jack Dyer	Jack Dyer	Leo Merrett	Dick Harris	
1944	1st	2nd	13	4	1	Won Preliminary Final against Essendon 108–87	Jack Dyer	Jack Dyer	Leo Merrett	Dick Harris	
1944	1st	2nd	13	4	1	Lost Grand Final to Fitzroy 66–51	Jack Dyer	Jack Dyer	Leo Merrett	Dick Harris	
1945	7th	–	11	9	–	–	Jack Dyer	Jack Dyer	Bill Morris	Fred Burge	
1946	5th	–	11	8	–	–	Jack Dyer	Jack Dyer	Jack Dyer	Arthur Mooney	
1947	4th	4th	12	7	–	Lost Semi-Final to Fitzroy 103–75	Jack Dyer	Jack Dyer	Bill Wilson	Jack Dyer	
1948	5th	–	11	7	1	–	Jack Dyer	Jack Dyer	Bill Morris	Jack Dyer	
1949	6th	–	10	9	–	–	Jack Dyer	Jack Dyer	Geoff Spring	Ray Poulter	
1950	6th	–	10	8	–	–	Bill Morris	Jack Dyer	Bill Morris	Ray Poulter	
1951	6th	–	10	8	–	–	Bill Morris	Jack Dyer	Des Rowe & Roy Wright	Jack O'Rourke	
1952	9th	–	8	11	–	–	Des Rowe	Jack Dyer	Roy Wright	Jack O'Rourke	
1953	10th	–	3	14	1	–	Des Rowe	Alby Pannam	Havel Rowe	Ron Branton	
1954	5th	–	10	8	–	–	Des Rowe	Alby Pannam	Roy Wright	Ron Branton	
1955	6th	–	9	9	–	–	Des Rowe	Alby Pannam	Des Rowe	Ray Poulter	
1956	10th	–	6	12	–	–	Des Rowe	Max Oppy	Laurie Sharp	Bob Dummett	
1957	7th	–	9	9	–	–	Des Rowe	Alan McDonald	Roy Wright	Bob Dummett	
1958	10th	–	7	11	–	–	Roy Wright	Alan McDonald	Dave Cuzens	Ted Langridge	
1959	11th	–	4	14	–	–	Roy Wright	Alan McDonald	Dave Cuzens	Bob Dummett	
1960	12th	–	2	14	2	–	Ron Branton	Alan McDonald	Ron Branton	Graeme Wilkinson	
1961	10th	–	5	13	–	–	Ron Branton	Des Rowe	Ron Branton	Ted Langridge	
1962	8th	–	5	13	–	–	Neville Crowe	Des Rowe	Ron Branton	Ted Langridge	
1963	10th	–	5	13	–	–	Neville Crowe	Des Rowe	Neville Crowe	Ian Hayden	
1964	9th	–	6	12	–	–	Neville Crowe	Dick Harris & Len Smith	Neville Crowe	Roger Dean	
1965	5th	–	10	8	–	–	Neville Crowe	Jack Titus & Len Smith	Bill Barrot	Mick Erwin	
1966	5th	–	13	4	1	–	Neville Crowe	Tom Hafey	Neville Crowe	Paddy Guinane	
1967	1st	1st	15	3	–	Won Semi-Final against Carlton 141–101	Fred Swift	Tom Hafey	Kevin Bartlett	Royce Hart	
1967	1st	1st	15	3	–	Won Grand Final against Geelong 114–105	Fred Swift	Tom Hafey	Kevin Bartlett	Royce Hart	
1968	5th	–	14	6	–	–	Roger Dean	Tom Hafey	Kevin Bartlett	Paddy Guinane	
1969	4th	1st	13	7	–	Won Semi-Final against Geelong 167–49	Roger Dean	Tom Hafey	Royce Hart	Rex Hunt	
1969	4th	1st	13	7	–	Won Preliminary Final against Collingwood 107–81	Roger Dean	Tom Hafey	Royce Hart	Rex Hunt	
1969	4th	1st	13	7	–	Won Grand Final against Carlton 85–60	Roger Dean	Tom Hafey	Royce Hart	Rex Hunt	
1970	6th	–	12	10	–	–	Roger Dean	Tom Hafey	Francis Bourke	Eric Moore	
1971	3rd	3rd	16	6	–	Won Semi-Final against Collingwood 121–77	Roger Dean	Tom Hafey & Verdun Howell	Ian Stewart	Royce Hart	
1971	3rd	3rd	16	6	–	Lost Preliminary Final against St Kilda 108–78	Roger Dean	Tom Hafey & Verdun Howell	Ian Stewart	Royce Hart	
1972	2nd	2nd	18	4	–	Won Qualifying Final against Collingwood 164–120	Royce Hart	Tom Hafey	Royce Hart	Ricky McLean & Neil Balme	
1972	2nd	2nd	18	4	–	Drew Semi-Final with Carlton 61–61	Royce Hart	Tom Hafey	Royce Hart	Ricky McLean & Neil Balme	
1972	2nd	2nd	18	4	–	Won Semi-Final rematch against Carlton 110–69	Royce Hart	Tom Hafey	Royce Hart	Ricky McLean & Neil Balme	
1972	2nd	2nd	18	4	–	Lost Grand Final to Carlton 177–150	Royce Hart	Tom Hafey	Royce Hart	Ricky McLean & Neil Balme	
1973	2nd	1st	17	5	–	Lost Qualifying Final to Carlton 91–71	Royce Hart	Tom Hafey	Kevin Bartlett	Neil Balme	
1973	2nd	1st	17	5	–	Won Semi-Final against St Kilda 108–68	Royce Hart	Tom Hafey	Kevin Bartlett	Neil Balme	
1973	2nd	1st	17	5	–	Won Preliminary Final against Collingwood 105–98	Royce Hart	Tom Hafey	Kevin Bartlett	Neil Balme	
1973	2nd	1st	17	5	–	Won Grand Final against Carlton 116–86	Royce Hart	Tom Hafey	Kevin Bartlett	Neil Balme	
1974	1st	1st	17	5	–	Won Semi-Final against North Melbourne 73–52	Royce Hart	Tom Hafey	Kevin Bartlett	Kevin Bartlett	
1974	1st	1st	17	5	–	Won Grand Final against North Melbourne 128–87	Royce Hart	Tom Hafey	Kevin Bartlett	Kevin Bartlett	
1975	4th	3rd	13	9	–	Won Elimination Final against Collingwood 77–73	Royce Hart	Tom Hafey	Kevin Morris	Kevin Bartlett	
1975	4th	3rd	13	9	–	Won Semi-Final against Carlton 71–62	Royce Hart	Tom Hafey	Kevin Morris	Kevin Bartlett	
1975	4th	3rd	13	9	–	Lost Preliminary Final to North Melbourne 76–59	Royce Hart	Tom Hafey	Kevin Morris	Kevin Bartlett	
1976	7th	–	10	12	–	–	Francis Bourke	Tom Hafey & Barry Richardson	Kevin Sheedy	Robert Lamb	
1977	4th	4th	14	7	1	Won Elimination Final against South Melbourne 88–54	Francis Bourke	Barry Richardson	Kevin Bartlett	Kevin Bartlett	
1977	4th	4th	14	7	1	Lost Semi-Final against North Melbourne 110–63	Francis Bourke	Barry Richardson	Kevin Bartlett	Kevin Bartlett	
1978	7th	–	10	11	1	–	Kevin Sheedy	Barry Richardson	Geoff Raines	Bruce Monteath	
1979	8th	–	9	13	–	–	Kevin Bartlett	Tony Jewell	Barry Rowlings	Michael Roach	
1980	3rd	1st	16	5	1	Won Qualifying Final against Carlton 116–74	Bruce Monteath	Tony Jewell	Geoff Raines	Michael Roach	
1980	3rd	1st	16	5	1	Won Semi-Final against Geelong 95–71	Bruce Monteath	Tony Jewell	Geoff Raines	Michael Roach	
1980	3rd	1st	16	5	1	Won Grand Final against Collingwood 159–78	Bruce Monteath	Tony Jewell	Geoff Raines	Michael Roach	
1981	7th	–	13	9	–	–	Bryan Wood	Tony Jewell	Geoff Raines	Michael Roach	
1982	1st	2nd	18	4	–	Won Semi-Final against Carlton 113–90	David Cloke	Francis Bourke	Maurice Rioli	Brian Taylor	
1982	1st	2nd	18	4	–	Lost Grand Final to Carlton 103–85	David Cloke	Francis Bourke	Maurice Rioli	Brian Taylor	
1983	10th	–	7	15	–	–	Barry Rowlings	Francis Bourke	Maurice Rioli	Michael Roach & Kevin Bartlett	
1984	8th	–	10	12	–	–	Barry Rowlings	Mike Patterson	Mark Lee	Brian Taylor	
1985	8th	–	9	13	–	–	Mark Lee	Paul Sproule	Trevor Poole	Michael Roach	
1986	10th	–	7	15	–	–	Mark Lee	Tony Jewell	Dale Weightman	Michael Roach	
1987	14th	–	5	17	–	–	Mark Lee	Tony Jewell	Dale Weightman	Michael Roach	
1988	10th	–	8	14	–	–	Dale Weightman	Kevin Bartlett	Michael Pickering	Jeff Hogg	
1989	14th	–	5	17	–	–	Dale Weightman	Kevin Bartlett	Tony Free	Jeff Hogg	
1990	11th	–	7	15	–	–	Dale Weightman	Kevin Bartlett	Matthew Knights	Stephen Ryan	
1991	13th	–	7	15	–	–	Dale Weightman	Kevin Bartlett	Craig Lambert	Jeff Hogg	
1992	13th	–	5	17	–	–	Dale Weightman	Allan Jeans	Matthew Knights	Jeff Hogg	
1993	14th	–	4	16	–	–	Jeff Hogg	John Northey	Tony Free	Jeff Hogg	
1994	9th	–	12	10	–	–	Tony Free	John Northey	Chris Bond	Matthew Richardson	
1995	3rd	3rd	15	6	1	Lost Qualifying Final to North Melbourne 114–84	Tony Free	John Northey	Wayne Campbell	Nick Daffy	
1995	3rd	3rd	15	6	1	Won Semi-Final against Essendon 86–73;	Tony Free	John Northey	Wayne Campbell	Nick Daffy	
1995	3rd	3rd	15	6	1	Lost Preliminary Final to Geelong 129–40	Tony Free	John Northey	Wayne Campbell	Nick Daffy	
1996	9th	–	11	11	–	–	Tony Free	Robert Walls	Paul Broderick	Matthew Richardson	
1997	13th	–	10	12	–	–	Matthew Knights	Robert Walls (round 1–17); Jeff Gieschen (round 18–22)	Wayne Campbell	Matthew Richardson	
1998	9th	–	12	10	–	–	Matthew Knights	Jeff Gieschen	Nick Daffy	Matthew Richardson	
1999	12th	–	9	13	–	–	Matthew Knights	Jeff Gieschen	Wayne Campbell	Matthew Richardson	
2000	9th	–	11	11	–	–	Matthew Knights	Danny Frawley	Andrew Kellaway	Matthew Rogers	
2001	4th	3rd	15	7	–	Lost Qualifying Final to Essendon 113–43	Wayne Campbell	Danny Frawley	Darren Gaspar	Matthew Richardson	
2001	4th	3rd	15	7	–	Won Semi-Final against Carlton 67–56	Wayne Campbell	Danny Frawley	Darren Gaspar	Matthew Richardson	
2001	4th	3rd	15	7	–	Lost Preliminary Final to Brisbane 136–68	Wayne Campbell	Danny Frawley	Darren Gaspar	Matthew Richardson	
2002	14th	–	7	15	–	–	Wayne Campbell	Danny Frawley	Wayne Campbell	Matthew Richardson	
2003	13th	–	7	15	–	–	Wayne Campbell	Danny Frawley	Mark Coughlan	Matthew Richardson	
2004	16th	–	4	18	–	–	Wayne Campbell	Danny Frawley	Joel Bowden	Matthew Richardson	
2005	12th	–	10	12	–	–	Kane Johnson	Terry Wallace	Joel Bowden	Matthew Richardson	
2006	9th	–	11	11	–	–	Kane Johnson	Terry Wallace	Kane Johnson	Matthew Richardson	
2007	16th	–	3	18	1	–	Kane Johnson	Terry Wallace	Matthew Richardson	Matthew Richardson	
2008	9th	–	11	10	1	–	Kane Johnson	Terry Wallace	Brett Deledio	Matthew Richardson	
2009	15th	–	5	16	1	–	Chris Newman	Terry Wallace (round 1–11); Jade Rawlings (round 12–22)	Brett Deledio	Mitch Morton	
2010	15th	–	6	16	–	–	Chris Newman	Damien Hardwick	Jack Riewoldt	Jack Riewoldt	
2011	12th	–	8	13	1	–	Chris Newman	Damien Hardwick	Trent Cotchin	Jack Riewoldt	
2012	12th	–	10	11	1	–	Chris Newman	Damien Hardwick	Trent Cotchin	Jack Riewoldt	
2013	5th	7th	15	7	–	Lost Elimination Final to Carlton 96–116	Trent Cotchin	Damien Hardwick	Daniel Jackson	Jack Riewoldt	
2014	8th	8th	12	10	–	Lost Elimination Final to Port Adelaide 132–75	Trent Cotchin	Damien Hardwick	Trent Cotchin	Jack Riewoldt	
2015	5th	7th	15	7	–	Lost Elimination Final to North Melbourne 88–105	Trent Cotchin	Damien Hardwick	Alex Rance	Jack Riewoldt	
2016	13th	–	8	14	–	–	Trent Cotchin	Damien Hardwick	Dustin Martin	Jack Riewoldt	
2017	3rd	1st	15	7	–	Won Qualifying Final against Geelong 91–40	Trent Cotchin	Damien Hardwick	Dustin Martin	Jack Riewoldt	
2017	3rd	1st	15	7	–	Won Preliminary Final against Greater Western Sydney 103–67	Trent Cotchin	Damien Hardwick	Dustin Martin	Jack Riewoldt	
2017	3rd	1st	15	7	–	Won Grand Final against Adelaide 108–60	Trent Cotchin	Damien Hardwick	Dustin Martin	Jack Riewoldt	
2018	1st	3rd	18	4	–	Won Qualifying Final against Hawthorn 95–64	Trent Cotchin	Damien Hardwick	Jack Riewoldt	Jack Riewoldt (70)	
2018	1st	3rd	18	4	–	Lost Preliminary Final to Collingwood 58–97	Trent Cotchin	Damien Hardwick	Jack Riewoldt	Jack Riewoldt (70)	
2019	3rd	1st	16	6	–	Won Qualifying Final against Brisbane Lions 112–65	Trent Cotchin	Damien Hardwick	Dion Prestia	Tom Lynch (63)	
2019	3rd	1st	16	6	–	Won Preliminary Final against Geelong 85–66	Trent Cotchin	Damien Hardwick	Dion Prestia	Tom Lynch (63)	
2019	3rd	1st	16	6	–	Won Grand Final against Greater Western Sydney 114–25	Trent Cotchin	Damien Hardwick	Dion Prestia	Tom Lynch (63)	
2020	3rd	1st	12	4	1	Lost Qualifying Final against Brisbane Lions 54–69	Trent Cotchin	Damien Hardwick	Jayden Short	Jack Riewoldt (33)	
2020	3rd	1st	12	4	1	Won Semi-Final against St Kilda 80–49	Trent Cotchin	Damien Hardwick	Jayden Short	Jack Riewoldt (33)	
2020	3rd	1st	12	4	1	Won Preliminary Final against Port Adelaide 46–40	Trent Cotchin	Damien Hardwick	Jayden Short	Jack Riewoldt (33)	
2020	3rd	1st	12	4	1	Won Grand Final against Geelong 81–50	Trent Cotchin	Damien Hardwick	Jayden Short	Jack Riewoldt (33)	
2021	12th	–	9	12	1	–	Trent Cotchin	Damien Hardwick	Dylan Grimes	Jack Riewoldt (51)	
2022	7th	7th	13	8	1	Lost Elimination Final to the Brisbane Lions 106–104	Dylan Grimes and Toby Nankervis	Damien Hardwick	Tom Lynch	Tom Lynch (60)	
2023	13th		10	12	1	–	Dylan Grimes and Toby Nankervis	Damien Hardwick / Andrew McQualter	Tim Taranto	Jack Riewoldt (32)	
2024	18th		2	21	–	–	Toby Nankervis	Adem Yze	Daniel Rioli	Shai Bolton (34)	

==== All-time records (1908−2022) ====
Game type		Played	Wins	Losses	Draws	W–L%
Home & Away season	Home	1126	650	461	15	.585
Home & Away season	Away	1126	495	622	9	.443
Home & Away season	Total	2252	1145	1083	24	.514
Finals		94	56	37	1	.602
Overall		2346	1201	1120	25	.517

Correct as at the end of the 2022 season.

=== Reserves ===
Premiers	Grand Finalist	Minor premiers	Finals appearance	Wildcard Round appearance	Wooden spoon	League leading goalkicker	League best and fairest

Year	League	Finish	W	L	D	Coach	Captain	Guinane Medal	Leading goalkicker	Goals	Ref
2014	VFL	12th	6	11	1	Tim Clarke	Ross Young	Ross Young	Matthew Mcdonough	11	
2015	VFL	13th	5	12	0	Tim Clarke	Jaryd Cachia	Matt Dea	Liam McBean	42	
2016	VFL	9th	9	9	0	Craig McRae	Sam Darley	Adam Marcon	Adam Marcon	9	
2017	VFL	5th	11	7	0	Craig McRae	Sam Darley	Anthony Miles	Ben Lennon	45	
2018	VFL	1st	14	4	0	Craig McRae	Steven Morris	Anthony Miles	Tyson Stengle	33	
2019	VFL	1st	16	2	0	Craig McRae	Steven Morris	Daniel Coffield	Jacob Townsend, Dan Butler, and Mabior Chol	21	
2020	VFL	(No season)						(No season)			
2021	VFL	11th	4	5	1	Xavier Clarke (from July)	Steven Morris	Will Martyn	Samson Ryan	15	
2022	VFL	9th	11	7	0	Steven Morris	Lachlan Street	Jake Aarts	Noah Cumberland	24	
2023	VFL	9th	10	7	1	Steven Morris	Lachlan Street	James Trezise	Kaelan Bradtke	24	
2024	VFL	9th	10	8	0	Steven Morris	Lachlan Street	Tom Brindley, Sam Davidson, and Lachlan Wilson	Sam Davidson	26	
