= List of Richmond Football Club coaches =

The following is a list of coaches who have coached the Richmond Football Club in a game of Australian rules football in the Australian Football League (AFL) (formerly the Victorian Football League (VFL)) and in the AFL Women's competition (AFLW).

== VFL/AFL ==
No.	Coach	C	W	L	D	W%	Years
1	Dick Condon	36	12	24	0	33.33	1908–09
2	Charlie Taylor	2	0	2	0	00.00	1909 (Rd17-18)
3	Alex Hall	18	7	10	1	41.67	1910
4	Len Incigneri	18	7	11	0	38.89	1911
5	Charlie Pannam	18	3	15	0	16.67	1912
6	Ern Jenkins	18	6	12	0	33.33	1913
7	Charlie Ricketts	47	18	29	0	38.30	1914–16
8	Percy Maybury	15	3	11	1	23.33	1917
9	Bernie Nolan	14	5	9	0	35.71	1918
10	Norm Clark	19	12	7	0	63.16	1919
11	Max Hislop	1	0	1	0	00.00	1920 SF
12	Dan Minogue	105	59	45	1	56.67	1920–25
13	Mel Morris	18	9	9	0	50.00	1926
14	Frank 'Checker' Hughes	120	87	31	2	73.33	1927–32
15	Billy Schmidt	21	16	5	0	76.19	1933
16	Percy Bentley	133	86	46	1	65.04	1934–40
17	Jack Titus	17	11	6	0	64.71	1937, 1941, 1965
18	Jack Dyer	226	135	89	2	60.18	1941–52
19	Alby Pannam	54	22	31	1	41.67	1953–55
20	Dick Harris	10	4	6	0	40.00	1944, 1964
21	Max Oppy	18	6	12	0	33.33	1956
22	Alan McDonald	72	22	48	2	31.94	1957–60
23	Des Rowe	54	15	39	0	27.78	1961–63
24	Len Smith	15	3	12	0	20.00	1964–65
25	Tom Hafey	248	173	73	2	70.16	1966–76
26	Verdun Howell	1	0	1	0	0.00	1971
27	Barry Richardson	47	25	20	2	55.32	1976–78
28	Tony Jewell	113	53	59	1	47.35	1979–82, 1985–87
29	Francis Bourke	46	26	20	0	56.52	1982–83
30	Mike Patterson	22	10	12	0	45.45	1984
31	Paul Sproule	22	9	13	0	40.91	1985
32	Kevin Bartlett	88	27	61	0	30.68	1988–91
33	Allan Jeans	22	5	17	0	22.73	1992
34	John Northey	67	32	34	1	48.51	1993–95
35	Robert Walls	39	17	22	0	43.59	1996–97
36	Jeff Gieschen	49	25	24	0	51.02	1997–99
37	Danny Frawley	113	45	68	0	39.82	2000–04
38	Terry Wallace	99	37	60	2	38.38	2005–09
39	Jade Rawlings	11	3	7	1	31.82	2009
40	Damien Hardwick	307	170	131	6	57.07	2010–23
41	Andrew McQualter	13	7	6	0	53.85	2023
42	Adem Yze	46	7	39	0		2024–
Key: C = coached, W = won, L = lost, D = drew, W% = win percentage
Statistics are correct to the end of the Round 24, 2025

== AFL Women's ==
No.	Coach	C	W	L	D	W%	Years
1	Tom Hunter	6	0	6	0	00.00	2020
2	Ryan Ferguson	39	18	20	1	46.2	2021-2025
Key: C = coached, W = won, L = lost, D = drew, W% = win percentage
Statistics are correct to March 2025
