= List of Richmond Football Club captains =

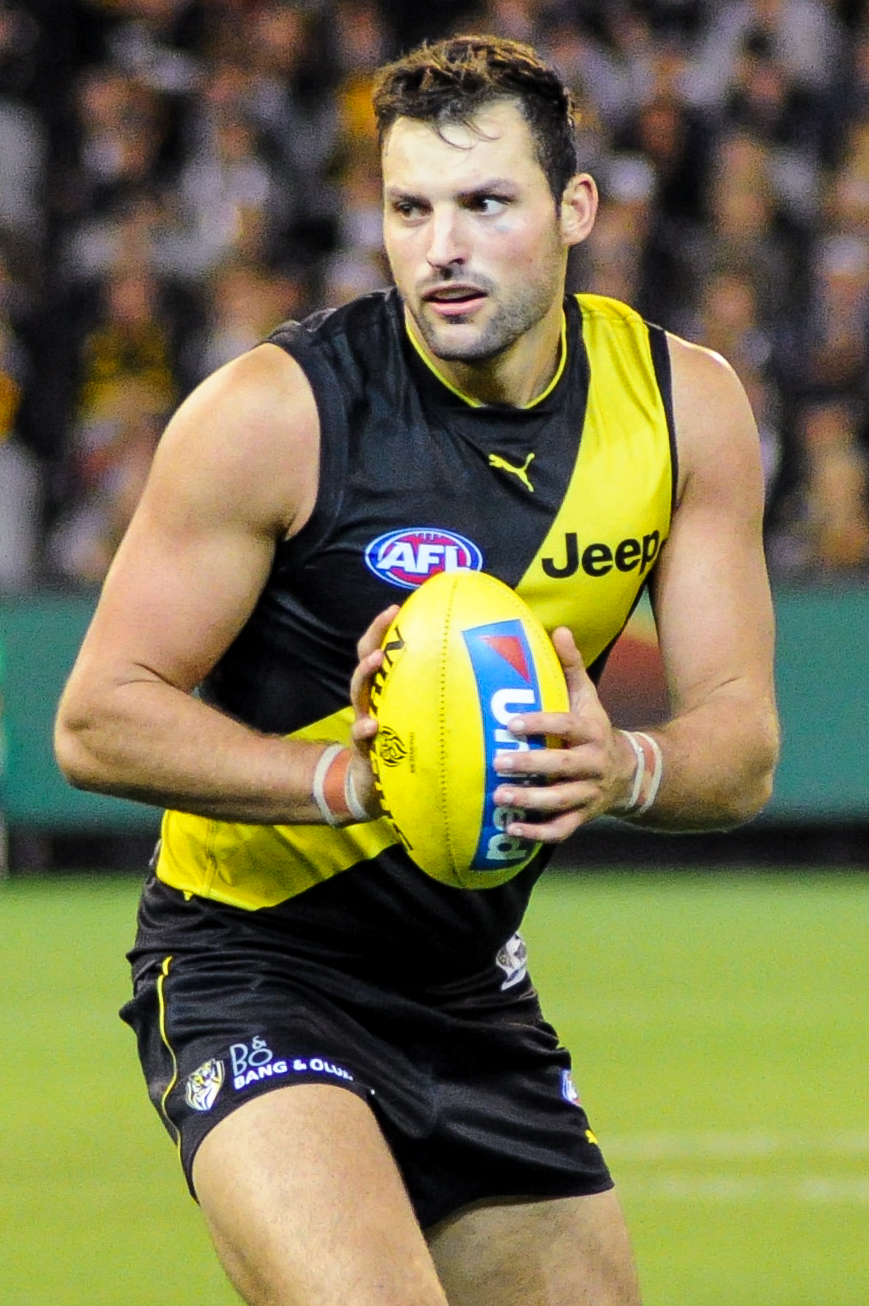
Toby Nankervis (pictured here in 2017) is the current captain of Richmond

This is a list of all captains of the Richmond Football Club, an Australian rules football club in the Australian Football League (AFL) and AFL Women's competition (AFLW).

== VFL/AFL ==
| Dates | Captain(s) | Notes |
|---|---|---|
| 1908 | Charlie Pannam | |
| 1909 | Dick Condon; John Lawson | |
| 1910 | Billy Schmidt | |
| 1911 | Len Incigneri | |
| 1912 | Ted Ohlson | |
| 1913 | Hugh James | |
| 1914 | Charlie Ricketts | |
| 1914–1916 | Bill Thomas | |
| 1917 | Percy Maybury | |
| 1918 | Clarrie Hall | |
| 1919 | Bill Thomas | |
| 1920–1925 | Dan Minogue | 1920 Premiership Captain; 1921 Premiership Captain |
| 1926 | Mel Morris | |
| 1927–1928 | Allan Geddes | |
| 1929 | Cyril Lilburne | |
| 1930 | Allan Geddes | |
| 1931 | Maurie Hunter | |
| 1932–1940 | Percy Bentley | 1932 Premiership Captain; 1934 Premiership Captain |
| 1941–1949 | Jack Dyer | 1943 Premiership Captain |
| 1950–1951 | Bill Morris | |
| 1952–1957 | Des Rowe | |
| 1958–1959 | Roy Wright | |
| 1960–1962 | Ron Branton | |
| 1963–1966 | Neville Crowe | |
| 1967 | Fred Swift | 1967 Premiership Captain |
| 1968–1971 | Roger Dean | 1969 Premiership Captain |
| 1972–1975 | Royce Hart | 1973 Premiership Captain; 1974 Premiership Captain |
| 1976–1977 | Francis Bourke | |
| 1978 | Kevin Sheedy | |
| 1979 | Kevin Bartlett | |
| 1980 | Bruce Monteath | 1980 Premiership Captain |
| 1981 | Bryan Wood | |
| 1982 | David Cloke | |
| 1983–1984 | Barry Rowlings | |
| 1985–1987 | Mark Lee | |
| 1988–1992 | Dale Weightman | |
| 1993 | Jeff Hogg | |
| 1994–1996 | Tony Free | |
| 1997–2000 | Matthew Knights | |
| 2001–2004 | Wayne Campbell | |
| 2005–2008 | Kane Johnson | |
| 2009–2012 | Chris Newman | |
| 2013–2021 | Trent Cotchin | 2017 Premiership Captain; 2019 Premiership Captain; 2020 Premiership Captain |
| 2022–2023 | Dylan Grimes; Toby Nankervis | Co-captains |
| 2024– | Toby Nankervis | |

== AFL Women's ==
| Dates | Captain(s) | Notes |
|---|---|---|
| 2020–2025 | Katie Brennan | Inaugural captain |
| 2026–present | Ellie McKenzie; Gabby Seymour | |
