= Jack Dyer Jr. =

Australian rules footballer

Jack Dyer

Personal information
- Full name: John Raymond Dyer Jr.
- Born: 14 December 1940 (age 85)
- Original team: East St Kilda CYMS (CYMSFA)
- Height: 182 cm (6 ft 0 in)
- Weight: 83 kg (183 lb)

Playing career^{1}
Years	Club	Games (Goals)
1960	Richmond (VFL)	3 (0)
1962–1963	Prahran (VFA)	11 (18)
- ^{1} Playing statistics correct to the end of 1963.

Career highlights
- 1960: VFL Reserves representative team

John Raymond Dyer Jr. (born 14 December 1940) is a former Australian rules footballer who played with Richmond in the Victorian Football League (VFL).

== Family ==
The son of Richmond great Jack Dyer (1913–2003), and Sybil Margaret Dyer (1915–1968), née McCasker. John Raymond Dyer was born on 14 December 1940.

He married Lorraine Helen Faulkener, in Richmond, on 26 June 1965.

== Football ==
=== Richmond (VFL) ===
Dyer played his early football with CYMS Football Association club East St Kilda CYMS, before moving into the Richmond junior grades; in 1959 he played 8 games for the Richmond Under-19 (Thirds), and from 1960 to 1961 played in 27 games for the Richmond Seconds. In 1960, he was selected for the VFL Reserves representative team.

He made three appearances for Richmond in the 1960 VFL season.

=== Prahran (VFA) ===
Having transferred to Prahran, he played in 16 senior games over two seasons (1962–1963).
