= 2007 Richmond Football Club season =

Richmond Football Club
2007 season
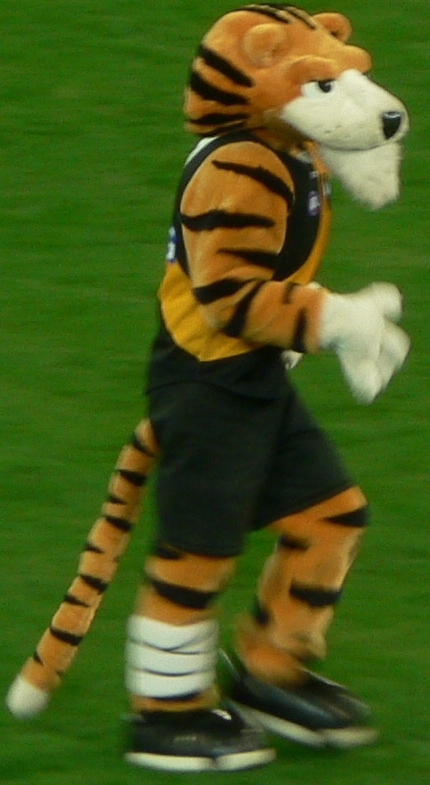
- Richmond Football Club mascot, Tiger "Stripes" Dyer
- President: Gary March
- Coach: Terry Wallace
- Captain: Kane Johnson
- Home ground: MCG
- Pre-season competition: First round
- AFL season: 16th
- Finals series: N/A
- Best and Fairest: Matthew Richardson
- Leading goalkicker: Matthew Richardson (53)

This article covers the 2007 season of the Richmond Football Club AFL team.

== Captains ==
- Captain: Kane Johnson
- Vice-Captain: Nathan Brown
- Deputy Vice-Captain: Joel Bowden

== Club List ==
=== Player List ===
Name	No.	Height	Weight	Birthdate	Debut	Previous clubs	Games				Goals
Name	No.	Height	Weight	Birthdate	Debut	Previous clubs	2006	2007	Total	Club	2007	Total
Bowden, Joel	11	188	91	21 June 1978	1996	West Alice Springs (NT)	21	22	235	235	3	154
Bowden, Patrick	16	191	90	4 August 1981	2001	Rovers (NT) / Western Bulldogs	22	3	75	25	1	70
Brown, Nathan	7	181	80	10 February 1978	1997	Golden Sq. / Bendigo U18 / Western Bulldogs	10	11	188	51	21	298
Casserly, Travis	37	188	80	20 May 1987	****	Swan Districts (WAFL)	0	0	0	0	0	0
Statistics are to end of 2007 Season

=== Rookie List ===
Name	No.	Height	Weight	Birthdate	Debut	Previous clubs	Games				Goals
Name	No.	Height	Weight	Birthdate	Debut	Previous clubs	2006	2007	Total	Club	2007	Total
Clingan, Tasman	45	183	70	4 July 1988	****	North Ballarat	0	0	0	0	0	0
Graham, Angus*	44	200	96	16 April 1987	2007	Currie (TAS) / Assumption College / Calder U18	0	2	2	2	0	0
Howat, Cameron*	43	182	77	30 January 1985	2006	Old Carey / Oakleigh U18 / Box Hill Hawks	5	15	20	20	6	10
King, Jake*	46	174	74	26 March 1984	2007	Coburg Tigers	0	19	19	19	2	2
Statistics are to end of 2007 Season (1 September 2007); *Promoted to senior list during the season

== Changes from 2006 List ==
=== Additions ===
- Graham Polak - Traded from Fremantle
- Jack Riewoldt - Pick 13 in 2006 AFL Draft
- Shane Edwards - Pick 26
- Daniel Connors - Pick 58
- Carl Peterson - Pick 60
- Andrew Collins - Pick 73
- Kent Kingsley - Pre Season Draft Pick 6
- Drew Moden - Pre Season Draft Pick 1 (brownlow contender)

=== Deletions ===
- Mark Chaffey - Retired
- Greg Stafford
- Andrew Kellaway - Delisted
- Thomas Roach
- David Rodan
- Dean Limbach

== Games ==
=== Wizard Cup ===
Date and Local Time	Opponent	Home or Away	Venue	Scores
Date and Local Time	Opponent	Home or Away	Venue	Result	Home	Away
First Round (Eliminated)
Sunday, February 25 - 3:40pm	Geelong	Away	Skilled Stadium	Lost by 43	3.17.10 (139)	1.14.3 (96)

=== Home and Away ===
Round	Date and Local Time	Opponent	Home or Away	Venue	Scores			Posn on Ladder
Round	Date and Local Time	Opponent	Home or Away	Venue	Result	Home	Away	Posn on Ladder
1	Sunday, April 1–5:10pm	Carlton	Away	MCG	Lost by 17	15.25 (115)	15.8 (98)	12
2	Saturday, April 7 - 2:10pm	Sydney	Home	MCG	Lost by 16	11.6 (72)	13.10 (88)	15
3	Friday, April 13 - 7:40pm	Collingwood	Away	MCG	Lost by 25	17.13 (57)	13.12 (90)	15
4	Friday, April 20 - 7:40pm	Western Bulldogs	Home	MCG	Lost by 32	14.16 (100)	10.12 (132)	15
5	Saturday, April 28 - 2:15pm	West Coast	Home	MCG	Lost by 33	11.10 (76)	14.15 (99)	15
6	Sunday, May 6 - 5:10pm	Geelong	Home	Telstra Dome	Lost by 157	9.11 (65)	35.12 (222)	16
7	Saturday, May 12 - 2:40pm	Port Adelaide	Away	AAMI Stadium	Lost by 40	16.19 (115)	10.15 (75)	16
8	Friday, May 18 - 7:10pm	Adelaide	Away	AAMI Stadium	Lost by 9	14.15 (99)	14.6 (90)	16
9	Saturday, May 26 - 7:40pm	Essendon	Home	MCG	Lost by 8	12.12 (84)	12.20 (92)	16
10	Saturday, June 2–7:15pm	Brisbane Lions	Home	Telstra Dome	Draw	10.13 (73)	10.13 (73)	16
11	Sunday, June 10 - 2:40pm	Fremantle	Away	Subiaco	Lost by 21	18.15 (123)	15.12 (102)	16
12	Friday, June 22 - 7:40pm	Melbourne	Home	MCG	Won by 49	18.16 (124)	11.9 (75)	16
13	Saturday, June 30 - 7:15pm	St Kilda	Away	Telstra Dome	Lost by 17	17.15 (117)	15.10 (100)	16
14	Sunday, July 8 - 5:10pm	Kangaroos	Home	Telstra Dome	Lost by 25	11.13 (79)	14.20 (104)	16
15	Sunday, July 15 - 2:10pm	Hawthorn	Away	MCG	Lost by 53	19.15 (129)	11.10 (76)	16
16	Sunday, July 22- 2:10pm	Port Adelaide	Home	MCG	Lost by 55	15.10 (100)	24.11 (155)	16
17	Saturday, July 28- 7:15pm	Sydney	Away	SCG	Lost by 66	21.12 (138)	10.12 (72)	16
18	Saturday, August 4- 2:10pm	Geelong	Away	Skilled Stadium	Lost by 70	21.13 (139)	11.3 (69)	16
19	Friday, August 10- 7:40pm	Collingwood	Home	MCG	Won by 20	18.8 (116)	14.12 (96)	16
20	Saturday, August 18- 5:40pm	West Coast	Away	Subiaco	Lost by 31	18.9 (117)	12.14 (86)	16
21	Saturday, August 26- 5:10pm	Essendon	Away	MCG	Won by 27	13.14 (92)	17.17 (119)	16
22	Saturday, September 1–2:10pm	St Kilda	Home	MCG	Lost by 10	13.14 (92)	14.18 (102)	16

== See also ==
- 2007 AFL season
- Richmond Football Club
