= Matt Incigneri =

Australian rules footballer (1891–1960)

Personal information
- Full name: Matthew Joseph Incigneri
- Born: 1 February 1891; Hastings, Victoria
- Died: 24 October 1960 (aged 69); Melbourne, Victoria
- Original team: Hastings
- Height: 183 cm (6 ft 0 in)
- Weight: 73 kg (161 lb)

Playing career^{1}
Years	Club	Games (Goals)
1911	Richmond	1 (0)
1913–14	Melbourne	2 (0)
Total		3 (0)
- ^{1} Playing statistics correct to the end of 1914.

Matthew Joseph Incigneri (1 February 1891 – 24 October 1960) was an Australian rules footballer who played with Richmond and Melbourne in the Victorian Football League (VFL).

He was the brother of Len Incigneri who also played in the VFL.
