= Charlie Backhouse =

Australian rules footballer

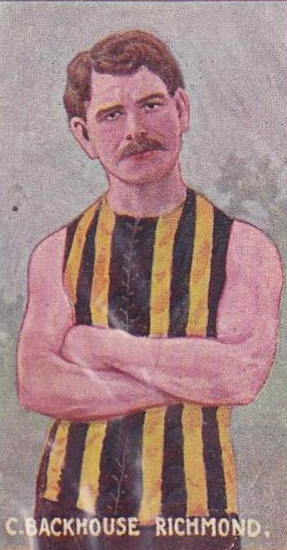
- Cigarette card of Backhouse in 1906

Personal information
- Full name: Charles Roger Backhouse
- Born: 1871; South Melbourne, Victoria
- Died: 5 August 1925; East Melbourne, Victoria
- Original team: Camberwell

Playing career^{1}
Years	Club	Games (Goals)
1890	Carlton (VFA)	7 approx
1891–1905	Richmond (VFA)	210 (42)
- ^{1} Playing statistics correct to the end of 1905.

Charles 'Charlie' Roger Backhouse (1871 – 5 August 1925) was an Australian rules footballer who played in the VFA for Carlton Football Club in 1890 and between 1891 and 1905 for the Richmond Football Club.

He was Captain of the Club in 1893 and played in the club's inaugural VFA Premiership side in 1902. In all he played 210 games for Richmond and kicked 42 goals. He also served on the Richmond Football Club Committee in 1894, 1900 and 1902.

He was made a life member of the Richmond Football Club in 1904 and was inducted into the club's Hall of Fame in its inaugural year, 2002.
