= Barry Rowlings =

Australian rules footballer

Personal information
- Full name: Barry John Rowlings
- Born: 21 August 1950 (age 76)
- Original team: Moe (LVFL)
- Height: 178 cm (5 ft 10 in)
- Weight: 77 kg (170 lb)

Playing career^{1}
Years	Club	Games (Goals)
1975–1978	Hawthorn	82 (78)
1979–1986	Richmond	152 (117)
Total		234 (195)
- ^{1} Playing statistics correct to the end of 1986.

Career highlights
- 2x VFL Premiership player: (1976, 1980); Jack Dyer Medal: (1979); Richmond captain: (1983–84); Richmond Hall of Fame, inducted 2015

Barry John Rowlings (born 21 August 1950) is a former Australian rules footballer who played for the Hawthorn Football Club and the Richmond Football Club in the Victorian Football League (VFL). He is one of few players to have played in League premierships at two clubs.

== Playing career ==
Recruited from Moe, Rowlings played in Hawthorn's 1975 Grand Final defeat to North Melbourne, kicking the first goal of the game. He was one of Hawthorn's best players in the emotional 1976 premiership triumph.

In 1978 Rowlings suffered a serious knee injury which prevented him from being part of Hawthorn's 1978 triumph, and was cleared to Richmond. In his first season at Tigerland won the Jack Dyer Medal, which is awarded to Richmond's best and fairest player for the season.

== After playing career ==
Since 1996 Rowlings has been involved with the football program at Caulfield Grammar School and Caulfield Grammarians Football Club, and holds a football ambassador and development coaching role for all year levels.

Rowlings has been partly responsible for the football development of many current AFL players, such as Brent Hartigan, Jason Winderlich, Chris Judd, Tristan Cartledge, Matthew Richardson, and Tom Roach.

== See also ==
- List of Caulfield Grammar School people
