= Matthew Knights =

Australian rules footballer (born 1970)

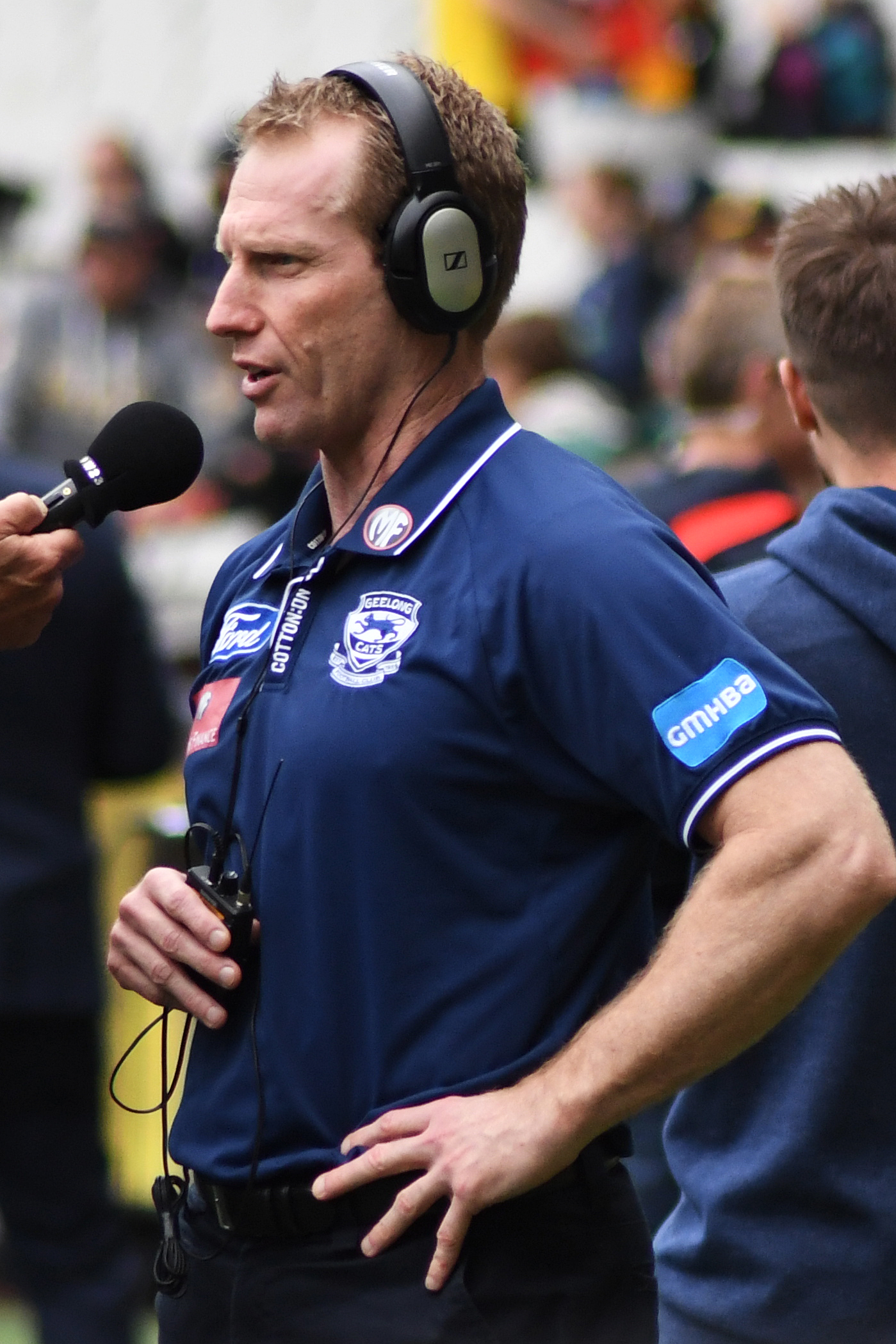
- Knights with Geelong in April 2019

Personal information
- Full name: Matthew Knights
- Born: 5 October 1970 (age 56); Mildura, Victoria
- Original team: Merbein, Mildura Imperials
- Height: 178 cm (5 ft 10 in)
- Weight: 79 kg (174 lb)

Playing career
Years	Club	Games (Goals)
1988–2002	Richmond	279 (141)

Coaching career^{3}
Years	Club	Games (W–L–D)
2008–2010	Essendon	67 (25–41–1)
2022	West Coast	1 (0–1–0)
- ^{3} Coaching statistics correct as of 2022.

Career highlights
- Richmond Football Club Best and Fairest: 1990, 1992; Richmond captain: 1997-2000; All-Australian: 1998; Richmond Football Club Team of The Century; AFL Life Member; Youngest player ever to win Best & Fairest at the Richmond; Richmond Football Club Under 19s Captain: 1988; State of Origin (Victoria): 1993, 1998; VFL Premiership Coach: 2012

Matthew Knights (born 5 October 1970) is an Australian rules football coach and former player who is currently serving as the Academy Development coach at Tasmania Football Club in the VFL before they join the AFL. He was previously assistant coach with the West Coast Eagles. Knights played in the midfield for the Richmond Football Club from 1988 to 2002, before going on to forge a coaching career, most notably as head coach of the Essendon Football Club from 2008 to 2010. He later became the head coach of the Geelong VFL Football Club from 2012 to 2014, guiding the Cats to the 2012 VFL Premiership and the 2013 VFL Grand Final.

== Playing career ==
=== Richmond ===
Knights wore the number 33 guernsey in 279 games between 1988 and 2002 for the Tigers whom he captained between 1997 and 2000. Playing in Richmond's midfield for the majority of his career, Knights was known for his ball-winning ability, if not his athleticism. Gifted with excellent "vision" or spatial awareness, and consistently reliable delivery from his left boot, given time and space, Knights was one of the most damaging midfielders in the AFL throughout the 90s.

Though rewarded with numerous individual honours playing in a mediocre team, Knights made only two appearances with the Tigers in the AFL Finals Series in 1995 and 2001. He was placed in the top four in the team's annual best and fairest vote seven times between 1990 and 2000, and tied for fourth place in the Brownlow Medal count of 1995.

Knights' career was interrupted by a serious ankle injury in Round 2 of 1996 and a knee injury in the pre-season Ansett Cup competition in 1997. Late in 1998, he became one of the first high-profile AFL players to be diagnosed with the debilitating groin condition osteitis pubis, which dogged him through much of the remainder of his career. His courage in leading his team despite these setbacks made him highly admired by his team's supporters, and his removal as captain just before the start of the 2001 season caused considerable controversy (despite this, Richmond went on to finish the season as preliminary finalists). In Round 2, he was the centre of a further public controversy when struck behind play by Western Bulldogs player Tony Liberatore, who was suspended for five matches as a result. The inability to maintain high expectations led to Knights' retirement as a player towards the end of the 2002 season.

== Coaching career ==
=== Early career ===
Knights was quickly recruited as assistant coach for the SANFL Port Adelaide Magpies and replaced Stephen Williams as senior coach the following year. Having played a major role in restructuring the club's playing list, but without having reached the finals, he resigned at the end of 2004 by mutual consent to become the senior coach the Bendigo Bombers in the VFL, while also acting as an assistant coach with the Essendon Football Club in the AFL for the 2007 season.

=== Essendon Football Club senior coach ===
In July 2007, Essendon announced that long-standing senior coach Kevin Sheedy would be replaced at the end of the 2007 AFL season and in September 2007, Knights was appointed as the club's new senior coach.

In 2009, Knights coached Essendon to its first finals series since 2004, but the team was soundly beaten by Adelaide in the elimination final.

In the 2010 season, Essendon won seven games and failed to make the finals. Criticism of Knights coaching performance increased during the season. On 12 August 2010, Essendon's CEO Ian Robson stated that Knights would continue as senior coach in 2011, but he was, nonetheless, sacked two weeks later on the day after Essendon's final round loss to the Western Bulldogs. He had two years remaining on his contract. Essendon won 25, drew one and lost 41 matches under Knights, during which they enjoyed three consecutive victories against Alastair Clarkson and the Hawthorn Football Club, and also enjoyed a 100% record against future three-time Richmond premiership coach Damien Hardwick. Knights was replaced by James Hird as Essendon Football Club senior coach.

=== Other coaching roles ===
For the 2011 season, Knights worked with the Xavier College football team in Kew.

During the 2012 season, Knights was the VFL coach for the Geelong Cats. He coached the team to the 2012 VFL premiership. In 2015, he was promoted to midfields coach.

On 13 September 2021, Knights left Geelong, and was hired by the West Coast Eagles as midfields coach. He was West Coast's stand-in coach in round 8 of the 2022 AFL season while head coach Adam Simpson was unavailable because of COVID-19 health protocols. Knights departed the Eagles in July 2024.

In December 2025 Knights was hired as the inaugural Academy Development coach for the Tasmania Football Club.

== Statistics ==
=== Playing statistics ===
Legend
G	Goals	K	Kicks	D	Disposals	T	Tackles
B	Behinds	H	Handballs	M	Marks

Season	Team	No.	Games	Totals							Averages (per game)							Votes
Season	Team	No.	Games	G	B	K	H	D	M	T	G	B	K	H	D	M	T	Votes
1988	Richmond	33	4	3	8	42	21	63	17	4	0.8	2.0	10.5	5.3	15.8	4.3	1.0	0
1989	Richmond	33	19	9	8	192	147	339	47	32	0.5	0.4	10.1	7.7	17.8	2.5	1.7	4
1990	Richmond	33	22	19	7	348	203	551	63	52	0.9	0.3	15.8	9.2	25.0	2.9	2.4	3
1991	Richmond	33	22	16	11	317	218	535	81	34	0.7	0.5	14.4	9.9	24.3	3.7	1.5	17
1992	Richmond	33	22	16	12	289	225	514	67	34	0.7	0.5	13.1	10.2	23.4	3.0	1.5	5
1993	Richmond	33	20	11	15	290	216	506	65	44	0.6	0.8	14.5	10.8	25.3	3.3	2.2	13
1994	Richmond	33	20	14	11	221	162	383	49	42	0.7	0.6	11.1	8.1	19.2	2.5	2.1	8
1995	Richmond	33	24	12	7	306	222	528	53	72	0.5	0.3	12.8	9.3	22.0	2.2	3.0	16
1996	Richmond	33	10	1	3	87	66	153	36	24	0.1	0.3	8.7	6.6	15.3	3.6	2.4	0
1997	Richmond	33	11	2	4	129	87	216	34	22	0.2	0.4	11.7	7.9	19.6	3.1	2.0	8
1998	Richmond	33	20	6	4	289	229	518	56	61	0.3	0.2	14.5	11.5	25.9	2.8	3.1	18
1999	Richmond	33	22	5	4	254	210	464	55	44	0.2	0.2	11.5	9.5	21.1	2.5	2.0	6
2000	Richmond	33	22	11	6	240	212	452	82	52	0.5	0.3	10.9	9.6	20.5	3.7	2.4	9
2001	Richmond	33	25	12	9	234	230	464	75	65	0.5	0.4	9.4	9.2	18.6	3.0	2.6	7
2002	Richmond	33	16	4	2	118	134	252	44	31	0.3	0.1	7.4	8.4	15.8	2.8	1.9	0
Career			279	141	111	3356	2582	5938	824	613	0.5	0.4	12.0	9.3	21.3	3.0	2.2	114

=== Coaching statistics ===
Legend
W	Wins	L	Losses	D	Draws	W%	Winning percentage	LP	Ladder position	LT	League teams

Season	Team	Games	W	L	D	W %	LP	LT
2008	Essendon	22	8	14	0	36.4%	12	16
2009	Essendon	23	10	12	1	45.7%	8	16
2010	Essendon	22	7	15	0	31.8%	14	16
Career totals		67	25	41	1	38.1%		

== Honours ==
- Richmond Football Club Best and Fairest 1990, 1992
- Richmond Football Club Captain 1997-2000
- All-Australian 1998
- Richmond Football Club Team of The Century
- AFL Life Member
- VFL Premiership Coach 2012
