= Wayne Campbell =

Australian rules footballer

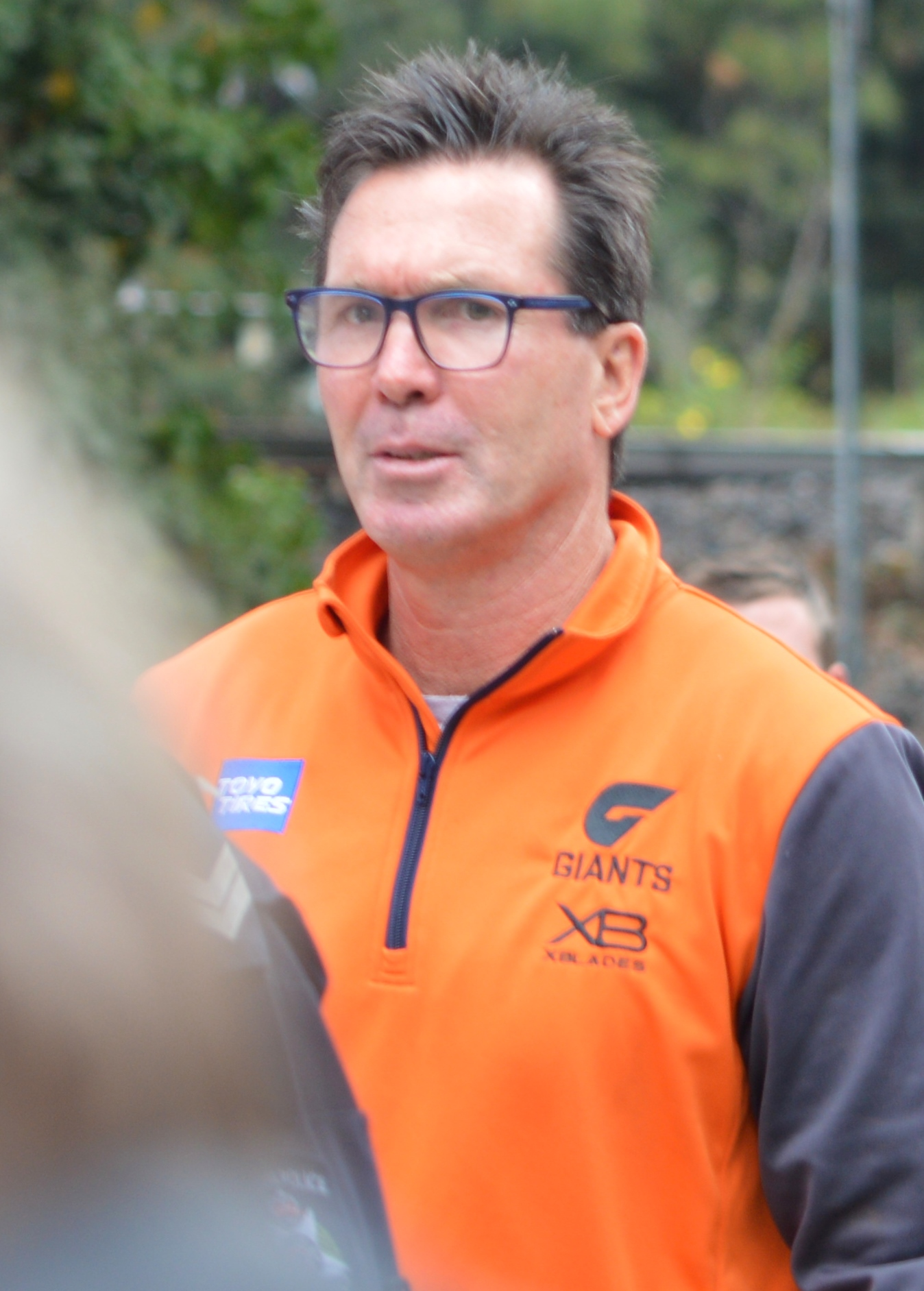
- Campbell with the GWS Giants in the 2019 AFL Grand Final Parade

Personal information
- Born: 23 September 1972 (age 54)
- Original team: Golden Square
- Height: 189 cm (6 ft 2 in)
- Weight: 88 kg (194 lb)

Playing career^{1}
Years	Club	Games (Goals)
1991–2005	Richmond	297 (172)
- ^{1} Playing statistics correct to the end of 2005.

Career highlights
- AFL: Richmond Hall of Fame – inducted 2013; Richmond Captain 2001-2004; 4x Richmond Best and Fairest 1995, 1997, 1999, 2002; 2× All Australian 1995, 1999; State of Origin (Victoria) 1998

Wayne Campbell (born 23 September 1972) is a retired Australian rules football player who was captain and four-time best-and-fairest for the Richmond Football Club in the AFL and was inducted into the Richmond Hall of Fame. Campbell was also twice-named an All-Australian. After retiring from playing at the end of 2005, Campbell went on to be an assistant coach and administrator with Richmond and a variety of other AFL clubs, and the AFL itself. He is currently the Head of the Sydney Swans football academy.

== Richmond career ==
=== Playing career ===
Campbell joined Richmond via the 1989 National Draft being the club's fifth pick (No. 29 overall). He previously played with his best mate Tony Maguire at Golden Square juniors. In a 15-season career from 1991 until 2005, Campbell played 297 games, three games short of the coveted 300-game milestone and the fourth-most in club history. He was club captain from 2001 to 2004 and was succeeded by Kane Johnson. Campbell was regarded as a very consistent player who played in the forward line, the backline and on the wing, before becoming the prime mover in the Richmond midfield during the mid-to-late 1990s with a reputation as a first-class decision maker.

Campbell won the Jack Dyer Medal (the award for the Best and Fairest player at the Richmond Football Club) four times, in 1995, 1997, 1999 and 2002. He was also runner-up in 1992, 1993 and 2001. He placed third for the award in 1998.

Campbell also received two All-Australian guernseys (awarded to players adjudged the best in their positions in the AFL competition) in 1995 and 1999. In addition, he represented Victoria in State of Origin matches and Australia in International Rules Series matches.

In 1995 he was favourite to win the Brownlow Medal (awarded to the Best and Fairest player in the AFL competition), having won various other media awards, but he polled poorly.

In June 2013, Campbell was inducted into the Richmond Hall of Fame.

=== Coaching and administration career ===
Campbell had a five-year stint in non-playing roles at Richmond, his last being Manager of VFL Strategy. Richmond's General Manager of Football, Dan Richardson, praised Campbell's work with the club saying, "Most recently, he has done an outstanding job in developing and implementing the strategy aligned to the establishment of the Club’s new VFL team.".

Campbell was an assistant coach at the Western Bulldogs for two years (2007 and 2008), under Rodney Eade. He then returned to Richmond in an administrative role.

In 2013 Campbell was appointed the AFL's national umpiring director, responsible for the development of the AFL's senior umpiring panel and the overall strategy for umpiring at all levels of the game.

Campbell left the umpiring job to become the football manager for the GWS Giants from 2016 to 2019, during which period the Giants reached the AFL finals every year including the grand final in 2019.

In 2021 Campbell took up the football manager role at the Gold Coast Suns. Campbell survived in the role after the Suns changed coaches at the end of 2023 and was manager when the Suns reached the finals for the first time in 2025. But Campbell resigned from the Gold Coast at the end of 2025 to take up a position as head of the Sydney Swans' football academy.

== Statistics ==
Legend
G	Goals	K	Kicks	D	Disposals	T	Tackles
B	Behinds	H	Handballs	M	Marks

Season	Team	No.	Games	Totals							Averages (per game)							Votes
Season	Team	No.	Games	G	B	K	H	D	M	T	G	B	K	H	D	M	T	Votes
1991	Richmond	46	12	5	6	143	66	209	36	21	0.4	0.5	11.9	5.5	17.4	3.0	1.8	0
1992	Richmond	9	21	21	10	331	224	555	100	28	1.0	0.5	15.8	10.7	26.4	4.8	1.3	3
1993	Richmond	9	20	8	16	335	152	487	92	34	0.4	0.8	16.8	7.6	24.4	4.6	1.7	5
1994	Richmond	9	20	11	11	243	153	396	54	26	0.6	0.6	12.2	7.7	19.8	2.7	1.3	0
1995	Richmond	9	25	16	15	420	174	594	90	39	0.6	0.6	16.8	7.0	23.8	3.6	1.6	10
1996	Richmond	9	21	15	11	325	181	506	67	41	0.7	0.5	15.5	8.6	24.1	3.2	2.0	4
1997	Richmond	9	21	4	7	350	205	555	83	37	0.2	0.3	16.7	9.8	26.4	4.0	1.8	6
1998	Richmond	9	21	13	6	311	244	555	68	65	0.6	0.3	14.8	11.6	26.4	3.2	3.1	4
1999	Richmond	9	22	17	4	380	175	555	94	35	0.8	0.2	17.3	8.0	25.2	4.3	1.6	10
2000	Richmond	9	17	14	6	239	147	386	99	35	0.8	0.4	14.1	8.6	22.7	5.8	2.1	7
2001	Richmond	9	25	16	8	346	261	607	114	71	0.6	0.3	13.8	10.4	24.3	4.6	2.8	4
2002	Richmond	9	22	12	7	297	216	513	91	69	0.5	0.3	13.5	9.8	23.3	4.1	3.1	8
2003	Richmond	9	9	5	4	116	68	184	44	13	0.6	0.4	12.9	7.6	20.4	4.9	1.4	6
2004	Richmond	17	19	2	1	237	180	417	97	49	0.1	0.1	12.5	9.5	21.9	5.1	2.6	1
2005	Richmond	9	22	13	6	201	206	407	114	32	0.6	0.3	9.1	9.4	18.5	5.2	1.5	2
Career			297	172	118	4274	2652	6926	1243	595	0.6	0.4	14.4	8.9	23.3	4.2	2.0	70
