= Charlie Ricketts =

Australian rules footballer

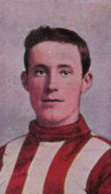

Personal information
- Full name: Charles Henry Thomas Ricketts
- Born: 3 July 1885; Geelong, Victoria
- Died: 7 March 1960 (aged 74); Middle Park, Victoria
- Original team: Richmond (VFA)
- Height: 173 cm (5 ft 8 in)
- Weight: 68 kg (150 lb)

Playing career^{1}
Years	Club	Games (Goals)
1906–1912	South Melbourne	82 (47)
1913–1914	Richmond	16 (11)
1921	St Kilda	5 (1)
Total		103 (59)

Coaching career^{3}
Years	Club	Games (W–L–D)
1909	South Melbourne	21 (16–5–0)
1912	South Melbourne	20 (14–6–0)
1914–1916	Richmond	47 (18–29–0)
1920–1921	St Kilda	27 (5–21–1)
Total		115 (53–61–1)
- ^{1} Playing statistics correct to the end of 1921.^{3} Coaching statistics correct as of 1921.

Career highlights
- VFA: Richmond premiership player 1905; VFL: South Melbourne premiership captain-coach 1909; South Melbourne captain 1909, 1912; St Kilda captain 1914; St Kilda captain 1921

Charles Henry Thomas Ricketts (3 July 1885 – 7 March 1960) was an Australian rules footballer and coach in the Victorian Football League.

Ricketts was a champion rover for the Richmond Football Club in the Victorian Football Association from 1903 to 1905. He represented the VFA twice in 1905 and kicked two goals in the Richmond premiership side.

The next season, he crossed to the South Melbourne Football Club in the Victorian Football League. He was considered a highly skilled player noted for his accuracy, particularly with his stab-kick passes. By 1908 he had earned a reputation as one of the premier players in the VFL and the following season he led South Melbourne to their first League premiership as captain-coach. Despite this success he was replaced as captain-coach for 1910 by William Thomas, but he regained his position for 1912, leading South Melbourne to a (losing) VFL Grand Final. For 1913 he was again denied the opportunity to captain the side by the disapproving South committee (despite winning the vote).

Ricketts moved back to Richmond, who were now in the VFL, for the 1913 and 1914 seasons before taking the reins as a non-playing coach for 1915 and 1916. After a hiatus from the VFL due to World War I, Ricketts coached St Kilda for the 1920 season and was playing coach in 1921. Following this, he retired from VFL football.
