= Jeff Gieschen =

Personal information
- Born: 22 September 1956 (age 70)
- Original team: Maffra

Playing career^{1}
Years	Club	Games (Goals)
1974–1978	Footscray	24 (1)

Coaching career
Years	Club	Games (W–L–D)
1992–1994	West Perth	69 (35–34–0)
1997–1999	Richmond	49 (25–24–0)
- ^{1} Playing statistics correct to the end of 1978.

Jeff Gieschen (born 22 September 1956) is the former National Umpire Manager of the Australian Football League (AFL) and a former Australian rules football player and coach who played in the Victorian Football League (VFL) between 1974 and 1978 for the Footscray Football Club. He was the senior coach of AFL club Richmond from late 1997 until the end of the 1999 season.

== Playing career ==
In 1971, Gieschen captained the State Championship winning La Trobe Valley Schoolboys team and was also named the Victorian Captain and All Australian vice captain in the U16's. He played 150 games in the Latrobe Valley Football League (LVFL) with the Maffra Football club during which time he collected three player of the year awards, two league best and fairest awards and seven Club Best and Fairest awards (including one as a 15-year-old in 1972). He represented the LVFL in inter-league games 15 times between 1973 and 1984 and was captain of the LVFL side in 1981. He was selected in the Victorian Country side to play the ACT in 1980. In the Ovens and Murray League he won Wodonga's Best and Fairest award in 1986, his only year as a player at that club.

In April 2023 Gieschen made the Weekly Times regional newspaper's "Living Legends - Best of the Bush" top 20. To make the list, " A player had to be a champion of the league they played in, have not played for a minimum 20 years and their achievements at VFL and AFL level carried no weight in the selection process."

In May 2024 Gieschen was included as a half back in the Weekly Times regional newspaper's "VIC COUNTRY DREAM TEAM" which was its selection of "its greatest team of country footballers to wear the Big V between 1980 and 2019".

=== Footscray ===
Gieschen played a total of 24 games and kicked one goal for Footscray from 1974 until 1978 in the VFL League.

== Coaching career ==
Gieschen coached the Maffra Football Club in 1979, 1980 and 1982 (and was inducted into the Maffra F.C.'s inaugural Hall of Fame in 2008).

He coached Wodonga from 1986 to 1991 for two premierships and was awarded Regional Coach of the Year in 1990. During his six years at Wodonga the club won five Ovens and Murray League club championships based on the combined results of the Senior, Reserve and Third grade teams. (He was also named as Wodonga's "coach of the century" in 2004).

He coached West Perth from 1992 to 1994 which included a grand final loss to Claremont in 1993, during which season he was awarded the JJ Leonard Medal for West Australian Coach of the Year Award. (West Perth also named him as coach of their "All Star Team of the Century" in 2008). In the 1995 season and the 1996 season, he was an assistant coach to Gary Ayres at the Geelong Football Club which included a grand final appearance in the 1995 season, which Geelong lost to Carlton.

=== Richmond Football Club ===
At the end of 1996, Gieschen was approached by Richmond to be their reserves coach and assistant coach under senior coach Robert Walls. Richmond reserves won the premiership in the first year, Gieschen coached them and he reluctantly stood in as caretaker senior coach for the Richmond Football Club senior side after Walls was sacked with five games to play in the 1997 season. Under Gieschen, the Tigers won four of those remaining five games to finish thirteenth on the ladder with ten wins and twelve losses. The reserves premiership and the four senior wins at the end of 1997 season gave rise to the Richmond cheersquad’s ‘Unleash the Giesch’ chant and made Gieschen a frontrunner for the Richmond senior coaching position. Gieschen was then appointed as full-time Richmond senior coach in 1998. In the 1998 season, Richmond under Gieschen, just missed out of the finals, where they finished ninth on the ladder with twelve wins and ten losses. However in the 1999 season, Richmond's on-field performance under Gieschen dropped when they finished twelve on the ladder with nine wins and thirteen losses. At the end of the 1999 season, Gieschen resigned as Richmond Football Club senior coach. Gieschen coached Richmond to a total of 49 games with 25 wins and 24 losses where Gieschen’s winning percentage as a senior AFL coach finished at 52 percent. Gieschen was then replaced by Danny Frawley as Richmond Football Club senior coach.

== AFL Umpires' Manager ==
Gieschen served as the Umpires' National Umpire Manager Australian Football League for 14 years, until his resignation which took effect on 28 November 2013. Gieschen (with the now former Head of Coaching for umpires, Rowan Sawers) has been acknowledged by the AFL (memorandum from Mark Evans, AFL Football Operations Manager, 30 October 2013) as "...the longest serving umpire coach/manager combination in the history of the AFL. They have overseen a period of great improvement in the professionalism and advancement of umpiring programs and the outstanding performance of umpires and officials in Finals and Grand Finals."

In his 14 years of managing the AFL's umpires Gieschen implemented a range of reforms which have included: stricter enforcement of the AFL's "abuse to umpires" policy; abolition of the white uniform as part of a conscious effort to eradicate the "white maggot" label previously applied to umpires; objective performance management criteria to ensure accurate ranking and appointment of umpires; introduced a DVD overviewing umpiring/laws of the game for umpires, clubs, media and fans; successfully recommended the implementation of taller goalposts to improve scoring accuracy; oversaw the introduction of the "score review system"; four boundary umpires to enable boundary umpires to keep up with the game; standardised fitness testing for umpires; player to umpire career pathway to encourage former players to take up umpiring roles; and the appointment of Chelsea Roffey, the first female umpire appointed to a final, including a grand final.

Following his departure from the AFL, Gieschen continues to work as a mentor to both coaches and players at a range of levels including at AFL level.
