= Dick Harris (Australian rules footballer) =

Australian rules footballer and coach

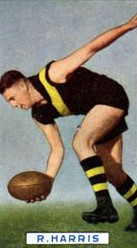

Personal information
- Full name: Richard Dennis Harris
- Born: 21 October 1911; Warrnambool, Victoria
- Died: 30 September 1993 (aged 81)
- Original team: Warrnambool
- Height: 171 cm (5 ft 7 in)
- Weight: 73 kg (161 lb)

Playing career^{1}
Years	Club	Games (Goals)
1934–1944	Richmond	196 (548)
1945–1947	Williamstown (VFA)	37 (141)
1947–1948	Yarraville (VFA)	34 (91)

Coaching career
Years	Club	Games (W–L–D)
1944, 1964	Richmond	10 (4–6–0)
- ^{1} Playing statistics correct to the end of 1948.

Career highlights
- Richmond Premiership Player 1934, 1943; Richmond Leading Goalkicker 1937, 1943, 1944; VFL Leading Goalkicker Medal 1937; Interstate Games:- 9; Richmond – Hall of Fame – inducted 2004

Richard Dennis Harris (21 October 1911 – 30 September 1993) was an Australian rules footballer who played in the Victorian Football League (VFL) between 1934 and 1944 for the Richmond Football Club. Harris played mainly as a rover and was highly successful in front of goals. He also represented Victoria at interstate football, playing a total of nine games for his state including the 1937 Perth Carnival.

== Early life ==
Born and raised in Warrnambool, he started his playing career with Victoria Ward in the Warrnambool Junior FA in 1927. His father had told him he would get a shilling for every goal he kicked. His first game he kicked seven goals. In 1931 he joined the main town side Warrnambool in the Western District Football League. He kicked 96 goals in his first season and was the league's leading goalkicker. In 1933 Warrnambool moved to the Hampden Football League and Harris was again the league's leading goalkicker with 85 goals.

== VFL career ==
At the end of 1933 Richmond recruited him and he made his debut for them in 1934. Harris played mainly as a rover and was highly successful in front of goals, kicking 51 goals in his debut season. He topped Richmond's goalkicking on three occasions and his career best 64 goals in the 1937 home and away season was the most in the VFL that year. A premiership player in 1934, Harris was a member of another Richmond premiership team in 1943 when he kicked seven goals in their five-point Grand Final win against Essendon Football Club.

== VFA career ==
At the end of the 1944 season he left the league and joined Victorian Football Association (VFA) club Williamstown, helping them to the 1945 premiership. Later, after two seasons at Williamstown, Harris was cleared to Yarraville as captain coach in May 1947.

== Later years ==
He moved onto the Federal league club Mordialloc, and captain-coached them to a hat-trick of premierships from 1950 to 1952. Harris later was appointed as Reserves coach for Camberwell in the VFA in 1953.

Harris returned to Richmond as the Reserve grade coach in 1956. He held the position until the end of 1965. In 1964 he acted as the senior coach of Richmond when their current coach, Len Smith, had a heart attack, Harris stepped up and coached to the end of the season.

== Sources ==
- Atkinson, G. (1982) Everything you ever wanted to know about Australian rules football but couldn't be bothered asking, The Five Mile Press: Melbourne. ISBN 0 86788 009 0.
- Hogan P: The Tigers of Old, Richmond FC, Melbourne 1996
- Richmond Football Club – Hall of Fame
- Dick Harris' playing record from The VFA Project
