= Alby Pannam =

Australian rules footballer, born 1914

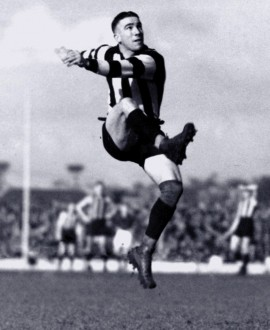
- Pannam in the 1930s

Personal information
- Full name: Albert Constantine Pannam
- Born: 19 April 1914; Abbotsford, Victoria
- Died: 17 March 1993 (aged 78)
- Original team: Carlton Brewery/Abbotsford Brewery
- Height: 168 cm (5 ft 6 in)
- Weight: 63.5 kg (140 lb)

Playing career^{1}
Years	Club	Games (Goals)
1933–1945	Collingwood	181 (453)
1947	Richmond	2 (6)
Total		183 (459)

Coaching career
Years	Club	Games (W–L–D)
1953–1955	Richmond	54 (22–31–1)
- ^{1} Playing statistics correct to the end of 1947.

Career highlights
- Collingwood Premiership Player 1935, 1936; Collingwood Best and Fairest 1942; Collingwood Leading Goalkicker 1941, 1942, 1943; Collingwood Captain 1945; Interstate Games: 2; Richmond Seconds Premiership Captain/Coach 1946

Albert Constantine Pannam (19 April 1914 – 17 March 1993) was an Australian rules footballer who played in the VFL between 1933 and 1943 and then again in 1945 for the Collingwood Football Club. He then was captain/coach for the Richmond Football Club Seconds side from 1946 to 1952, leading them to the premiership in 1946. During this tenure he played twice for the Richmond senior side in 1947. He was senior coach of Richmond from 1953 to 1955. He later coached Oakleigh in the VFA to the 1960 premiership.

He was the son of AFL legend Charlie Pannam who also was a dual premiership player, leading goalkicker and captain of Collingwood and senior coach of Richmond.

Pannam also served in the Royal Australian Air Force during World War II.
