= Kane Johnson =

Australian rules footballer, born 1978

Personal information
- Full name: Kane Johnson
- Nickname: Sugar
- Born: 15 March 1978 (age 48); Victoria
- Original team: Ringwood / Eastern Ranges
- Draft: 27th overall, 1995; Adelaide Crows
- Height: 187 cm (6 ft 2 in)
- Weight: 85 kg (187 lb)
- Position: Midfielder

Playing career^{1}
Years	Club	Games (Goals)
1996–2002	Adelaide	104 (44)
2003–2008	Richmond	116 (32)
Total		220 (76)
- ^{1} Playing statistics correct to the end of 2007.

Career highlights
- 2× AFL premiership player (1997, 1998); Adelaide Team of the Decade – half-forward flank; Richmond captain (2005–2008); Jack Dyer Medal (2006); AFL Rising Star nominee (1997)

Kane Johnson (born 15 March 1978) is a former Australian rules footballer and former captain of the Richmond Football Club and dual premiership winner with the Adelaide Crows in the Australian Football League (AFL).

== Career ==
He began his career with the Adelaide Crows in 1996 and played in their 1997 and 1998 premiership sides before his 21st birthday. Over the years he developed into an outstanding midfielder. He became a key member of Adelaide's onball group, but in 2001 requested that he be allowed to return to his home state of Victoria after playing out his contract the following year. The Crows management obliged, and at the end of 2002, Johnson was traded to Richmond for Jason Torney and a complicated exchange of draft picks that saw picks No. 2, No. 18 and No. 32 go from Richmond to Adelaide and picks No. 12, No. 28 and No. 41 go the other way. Whilst there, Johnson became a star player and was rewarded with the captaincy of the club in 2005. This came following Wayne Campbell's decision to step down from the position. While Johnson's 2005 season was not as good as his 2004, he still was among the Tigers' best players.

In 2006, Johnson had an outstanding season, playing as a tagger and keeping many of the game's star players in check. He won the club's best and fairest for his efforts.

Following the 2008 season, Kane Johnson stood aside as captain and was replaced by Chris Newman. He retired on 9 June 2009 after an injury believing the time was right. He remained involved as a development coach for the club for the remainder of the 2009 season.

In 2013, four years post retirement Kane now works with a variety of individuals teaching the ancient art of Qigong with modern philosophies.

== Personal ==
In 2014, Kane Johnson had a son with his long-term girlfriend, Charis McKittrick.

== Statistics ==
Legend
G	Goals	K	Kicks	D	Disposals	T	Tackles
B	Behinds	H	Handballs	M	Marks

Season	Team	No.	Games	Totals							Averages (per game)						
Season	Team	No.	Games	G	B	K	H	D	M	T	G	B	K	H	D	M	T
1996	Adelaide	28	2	0	0	3	3	6	1	0	0.0	0.0	1.5	1.5	3.0	0.5	0.0
1997	Adelaide	28	23	7	6	213	119	332	96	32	0.3	0.3	9.3	5.2	14.4	4.2	1.4
1998	Adelaide	28	12	2	6	95	63	158	31	15	0.2	0.5	7.9	5.3	13.2	2.6	1.3
1999	Adelaide	28	15	6	3	145	102	247	51	12	0.4	0.2	9.7	6.8	16.5	3.4	0.8
2000	Adelaide	28	15	4	2	127	97	224	47	24	0.3	0.1	8.5	6.5	14.9	3.1	1.6
2001	Adelaide	28	18	15	6	188	111	299	75	29	0.8	0.3	10.4	6.2	16.6	4.2	1.6
2002	Adelaide	28	19	10	9	250	193	443	77	30	0.5	0.5	13.2	10.2	23.3	4.1	1.6
2003	Richmond	28	20	10	10	283	154	437	88	58	0.5	0.5	14.2	7.7	21.9	4.4	2.9
2004	Richmond	28	19	3	3	257	214	471	106	56	0.2	0.2	13.5	11.3	24.8	5.6	2.9
2005	Richmond	17	18	5	4	245	167	412	86	44	0.3	0.2	13.6	9.3	22.9	4.8	2.4
2006	Richmond	17	19	5	2	202	126	328	104	47	0.3	0.1	10.6	6.6	17.3	5.5	2.5
2007	Richmond	17	22	4	3	243	197	440	126	70	0.2	0.1	11.0	9.0	20.0	5.7	3.2
2008	Richmond	17	18	5	2	206	225	431	126	54	0.3	0.1	11.4	12.5	23.9	7.0	3.0
Career			220	76	56	2457	1771	4228	1014	471	0.3	0.3	11.2	8.1	19.2	4.6	2.1
