= Jack Dyer =

Australian rules footballer (1913–2003)

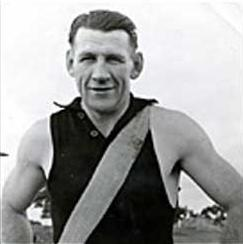

Personal information
- Full name: John Raymond Dyer Sr.
- Nickname: Captain Blood
- Born: 15 November 1913; Oakleigh, Victoria
- Died: 23 August 2003 (aged 89); Box Hill, Victoria
- Original team: St. Ignatius
- Height: 185 cm (6 ft 1 in)
- Weight: 89 kg (196 lb)
- Position: Ruck/ruck-rover/forward

Playing career^{1}
Years	Club	Games (Goals)
1931–1949	Richmond	311 (443)

Representative team honours
Years	Team	Games (Goals)
	Victoria	16

Coaching career^{3}
Years	Club	Games (W–L–D)
1941–1952	Richmond	222 (134–86–2)
- ^{1} Playing statistics correct to the end of 1949.^{3} Coaching statistics correct as of 1952.

Career highlights
- VFL: 2x VFL Premiership: (1934, 1943); 5x Richmond Best & Fairest: (1937, 1938, 1939, 1940, 1946); 2x Richmond leading goalkicker: (1947, 1948); Richmond Captain: (1941–1949); AFL Team of the Century; Australian Football Hall of Fame – Legend Status, (Inaugural Legend); Richmond Team of the Century; Richmond Hall of Fame – Immortal Status, (Inaugural); Tiger Treasure (The Strong & the Bold); Representative: National Football Carnival: Championship: 1937; Victoria Captain: 1941, 1949; Coaching: VFL Premiership: 1943

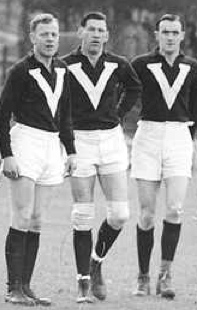
Jim Park of Carlton, Dyer (age 24), and Phonse Kyne of Collingwood, at the Adelaide Oval, before the 1938 interstate match against South Australia

John Raymond Dyer Sr. OAM (15 November 1913 – 23 August 2003), nicknamed Captain Blood, was an Australian rules footballer who played for the Richmond Football Club in the Victorian Football League (VFL) between 1931 and 1949. One of the game's most prominent players, he was one of 12 inaugural "Legends" inducted into the Australian Football Hall of Fame. He later turned to coaching and work in the media as a popular broadcaster and journalist.

== Early life ==
Dyer was born in Oakleigh, now a south-eastern suburb of Melbourne, but grew up in the small farming hamlet of Yarra Junction on the Yarra River, approximately 60 kilometres (37 mi) east of the city. His parents, Ben and Nellie, were of Irish descent. The second of three children, Dyer had an elder brother, Vin, and a younger sister, Eileen. Dyer first played football at the Yarra Junction primary school. For his secondary education, Dyer was sent by his parents to St Ignatius in Richmond. He boarded in the city with an aunt. One of the brothers running the school offered Dyer a sporting scholarship to De La Salle College, Malvern. After leaving school with several sporting trophies, Dyer played with St Ignatius on Saturdays and with Richmond Hill Old Boys in a mid-week competition. Dyer's desire was to play for Richmond in the VFL as he admired one of the Tigers' players, George Rudolph.

== Sporting career ==
In 1930, Dyer won the Metropolitan League's award for the best player at the age of 16. Richmond officials had not yet attempted to sign him, and Dyer applied for a clearance to play with the Tigers' main rival, Collingwood. The Richmond officials wanted to see him in action before any decision was made and Dyer was in training with Richmond for the start of the 1931 season. Richmond's coach 'Checker' Hughes pitting Dyer against veteran Joe Murdoch in a practice session. Dyer hardly touched the ball and was disheartened about his prospects until Hughes consoled him by explaining the pairing with Murdoch was a trial of courage, not skill.

Hughes selected him for his debut in just the second game of the season, against North Melbourne. Dyer was made a reserve while the team achieved a VFL record score of 30.19 (199) in one of the biggest wins in VFL/AFL history. Hughes left Dyer on the bench. It was the height of the Great Depression and the going rate for the players was 3 pounds per match, but Richmond only paid half that for unused reserves, so Hughes saved the club thirty shillings on the day. Dyer got another couple of chances and showed some form, but by mid-season found himself in the seconds team, with players who were not quite league standard, but wanted to stay on at the club and earn an extra few shillings per week to support their families.

At one point, Dyer walked away from Richmond for a few weeks and returned to suburban football. Club secretary Percy Page persuaded him back by promising to clear any recalcitrant players. In the run up to the finals, with Richmond sitting second on the ladder, ruckman Percy Bentley went down with an injury that ended his season. Hughes included Dyer in the Tigers' team for the second semi final against Geelong. Playing mainly up forward, the unknown Dyer played a successful game, kicking three goals. In the Grand Final a fortnight later, again against Geelong, Geelong used their player and coach "Bull" Coghlan playing on Dyer. Coghlan played roughly against Dyer; Dyer had only four touches for the day and admitted many years later to being intimidated.

In 1932, partnering Bentley in the ruck, Dyer played successfully in the first half of the season before suffering a serious knee injury that put him out for the rest of the year. In ten matches, Dyer received 12 Brownlow medal votes for four best afield performances. He was chosen for Victoria after fewer than a dozen league matches. On Grand Final day, Dyer was back in reserve as his teammates won Richmond's third premiership after several finals failures.

Dyer did reappear in 1933, wearing a dirty knee bandage. In his own phrase, Dyer was unable to "turn off" or "pull up" and he sometimes collected a teammate if his timing was out. In the Grand Final against South Melbourne, Richmond lost by eight goals, but Dyer achieved thirty touches. In the following year's Grand Final, the Tigers won in a rematch with the Swans. Richmond's successfully used a ruck combination of Bentley, Dyer and rover Ray Martin.

== Captain Blood ==
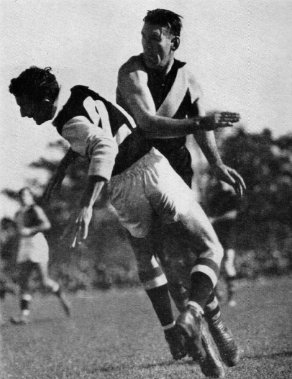
An oft-reproduced 1949 photograph of Dyer appearing to "decapitate" St Kilda's Tom Meehan

The number of on-field incidents grew, and, after a particularly difficult game during 1935, newspaper cartoonist John Ludlow in The Age drew a picture of Dyer as a pirate, while a journalist nicknamed him Captain Blood after the Errol Flynn film Captain Blood. Initially, Dyer was angry at the connotation and the implied slur on his sportsmanship. Dyer preferred the hip-and-shoulder method of meeting an opponent rather than grabbing him in a tackle. The force of being hit by the athletic, 89 kg frame of Dyer was often enough to leave a player prostrate and not wanting to re-enter the fray for a while. Occasionally, the hip and shoulder could go awry and Dyer's forearm would come into play, which was a reportable offence. In a nineteen-year career, he was reported five times and suspended once.

Dyer was keen to take on a coaching role, and he had reportedly been promised the position of playing coach by the Richmond committee at the end of 1939 before it reneged and re-appointed Percy Bentley. As a consequence, Dyer announced that he would not play for Richmond in 1940. He received a lucrative offer to become captain-coach of the Yarraville Football Club in the Victorian Football Association (which, at the time, was aggressively recruiting VFL stars to play under its new throw-pass rules), and he lodged a request with Richmond for a clearance to the VFA club. Richmond rejected the clearance, and Dyer was unwilling to transfer without a clearance (even though one was not required at the time). Dyer ultimately decided to remain with Richmond as a player in 1940, and he was appointed captain-coach in 1941.

He went on to play 312 games for Richmond, being voted the club's best and fairest player in 1937, 1938, 1939, 1940, and 1946. He played in seven Grand Finals for two premierships in 1934 and 1943, one as captain and playing coach of the side.

Dyer was a ruckman; and, at 6 ft 1 in (185 cm), was not particularly tall for that position. Possessed of great strength, he was adept at punching the ball out of a pack contesting a mark, often sending the ball more than 40 yards.

In 1947, Dyer crashed into Melbourne's Frank Hanna in round 15. The umpire cleared him for rough conduct, though Hanna was knocked unconscious. Don Cordner checked his pulse and Hanna was covered with a blanket, including his head, and was carried off on a stretcher. Dyer thought he had killed Hanna. By three-quarter time, he still believed he had killed him until he asked a Demon player about Hanna's condition, and Hanna had recovered.

He was selected as an interchange player in the AFL's 1996 Team of the Century". He gradually played less as a ruckman and more as a forward later in his career. He invented the drop punt, a kicking style that gradually gained popularity over the intervening decades and is now almost universal, and has now spread to Rugby union, rugby league and American football. He kicked 443 goals, fifth on Richmond's list of all-time goalkickers.

In 2009, The Australian nominated Dyer as one of the 25 greatest footballers never to win a Brownlow medal.

The "Jack Dyer Medal" is awarded each season to the winner of the Richmond Football Club's best and fairest count. Since the 2000s, the Richmond captain has automatically switched to wearing guernsey number 17, the number worn by Dyer throughout his career. But when Trent Cotchin took over the captaincy of the Tigers in 2013, he continued wearing his number 9.

== Rescindment of Dyer's 1932 best and fairest award ==
Following a 19-year investigation undertaken by members of the Historical Committee, no evidence was found to have any winner of a "Best and Fairest Award" for Richmond in 18 of the seasons between 1911 and 1936. It is thought that the awards in question were retrospectively added in 1988 and 1991 in error. As a consequence, he now shares his Richmond best and fairest tally record of 5 with fellow AFL Legend Kevin Bartlett.

== Personal life ==
External images
- Caricature of Jack Dyer by Alex Gurney. Source: The Australian Cartoon Museum.
- Jack Dyer's Milk Bar, 394 Church Street, Richmond. Source: The Richmond Library.

He married Sybil Margaret McCasker, the cousin of Keith "Bluey" Truscott, on 25 November 1939 at St Ignatius' Church, Richmond.

After an assortment of jobs in his early adulthood, Dyer joined the police force in July 1935. Dyer served in the police for nine years, before he resigned to conduct a milk bar, The Tiger Milk Bar and Newsagency at 394 Church Street, Richmond. In 1949 he became the publican at the Foresters' Arms Hotel in Port Melbourne, and in 1952, the publican at the Post Office Hotel in Prahran.

On 8 March 1940, Richmond announced that they had refused the recently married Dyer a clearance to coach VFA club Yarraville; and Dyer stated that he would not cross to Yarraville without a clearance.

He and his wife Sybil had two children, Jack Jr (Jackie, born 15 December 1940) and Jill (married name Devine). Jackie had a brief career at Punt Road from 1959 to 1961, playing three games, but retired from all football aged just 23.

Following Sybil's sudden death in 1968, Dyer met Dorothy Eskell, with whom he spent 25 years. Dorothy supported him in his media career, and they lived together in Frankston. In his final years, Dyer lived in a nursing home.

== Media career ==
After retiring from coaching, Dyer turned to the media, where he became a commentator and football media personality. He contributed to two sports/comedy offerings on Melbourne television: World of Sport, a Sunday morning panel show; and, later, League Teams, a Thursday-night variant which later inspired AFL Footy Show. He also had a regular column which went under the name "Dyer 'ere" (a pun on diarrhoea) in Melbourne's Truth newspaper.

His media work began after resigning from the coaching position at Richmond. Dyer, along with former Collingwood captain Lou Richards, became an early television commentator on Australian football after the medium was introduced to Australia in 1956.

Dyer also was a radio broadcaster – for many years, he and Ian Major called football matches for radio station 3KZ (KZ-FM after the station converted to FM in 1990) as The Captain and The Major.

=== "Dyerisms" ===
According to various historical articles, videos, quotes on the official Richmond website, and press obituaries, Dyer was responsible for many malapropisms, witticisms, and comical gaffes, including:

- "Yes, we had an enjoyable time on the French Riverina" (the Riverina is a highly productive agricultural region of south-western New South Wales), and he described the problems with younger players by saying that "All they want to do is sit around and smoke marinara".

Other memorable quotes include:

- "I won't say anything in case I say something."
- "Bartlett's older than he's ever been before."
- "Johnston missed one from the 10-yard square – it was impossible to miss that."
- "The only way to tackle Justin Madden is... I don't know."
- "That's the beauty of being small – your hands are close to your feet."
- "Bamblett made a great debut last week, and an even better one today."
- "The ball goes to Marceesie ... Marcheson ... McKann, er ..." before co-commentator Ian Major interjected: "Actually, Jack, I don't think Marchesani was in that passage of play."
- "Mark Lee's long arms reaching up like giant testicles."
- "It's as dark out there as the Black Hole of Dakota."
- "The goal posts are moving so fast I can't keep up with the play."
- And on World of Sport, Dyer declared that Fitzroy had "copulated to the opposition"
- “He keeps getting where the ball ain't.”
- “Henshaw passes the ball to Kelly, and Kelly gives a Henshaw to Glendinning.”
- “There weren’t too many best mans on the ground.”
- If you don't mind, umpire, please!
- “He’s tuckled strongly by Tack.”
- During his coaching career at Richmond, Jack once instructed his players in a training session to “pair off in threes”.
- He once said that he hated Collingwood so much, he couldn't even watch black-and-white TV.

== Retirement ==
Retiring from the media in the early 1990s, when KZ-FM stopped broadcasting football, Dyer successfully led opposition to an AFL proposed merger of his old club with St Kilda in 1989.

== Photograph from 1944 Essendon match ==
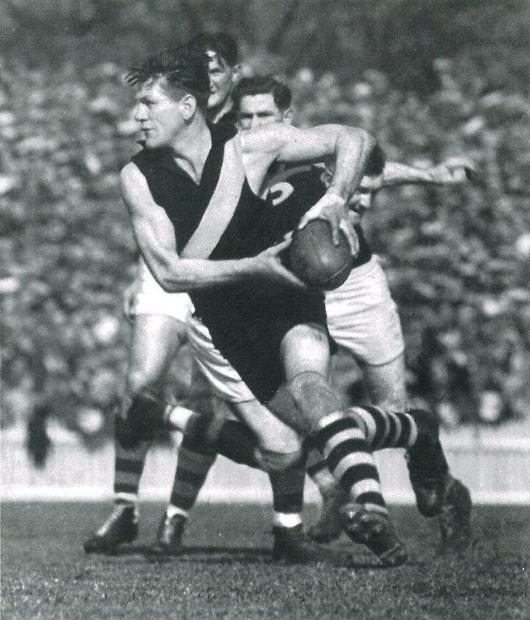
The iconic photograph

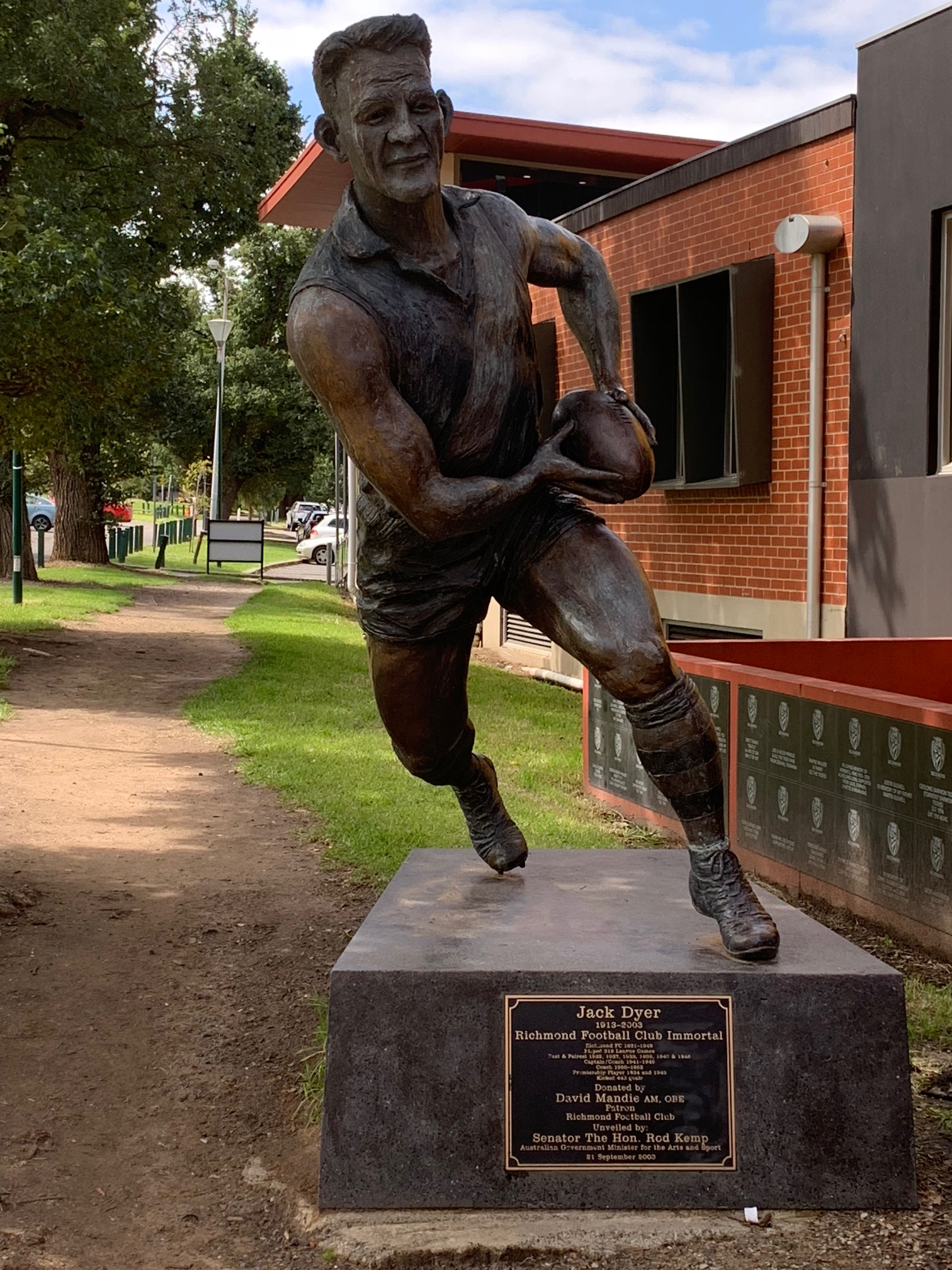
A statue based on the photograph, located at Punt Road Oval

A photograph was taken of Richmond captain-coach Dyer, aged 30 and playing his 222nd game, wearing white strapping on his left thumb and a dirty knee bandage on his left knee, breaking away from the pack, with his eyes fixed on the lake-end goals (Dyer went on to kick a goal) in the last quarter of the 1944 Preliminary Final, held at the Junction Oval on Saturday 23 September 1944, in which Richmond defeated Essendon, primarily due to Dyer's nine goals.

Led by a four-goal burst by Dyer, who was playing at full-forward, Richmond scored 8.2 (50) to 0.5 (5) in the first quarter (kicking against the wind); and, although Essendon outscored Richmond in the last three quarters, Richmond won the match 16.12 (108) to 12.15 (87).

Dyer's performance that day was one of the best individual performances by a Richmond player in the club's history. A match reporter for The Argus, in an article titled "Dyer's Grand First Quarter", wrote:

Rarely has a higher standard of play been seen in a first quarter in second-round games. Clapping on the pace, and with the ball the objective all through, Richmond played a strong, concerted game. With Dyer the spearhead after the first few minutes, the strong captain-coach played one of the finest games in his career to kick four of the eight goals scored [in that quarter] and take a hand in at least three others. He showed dash, cleverness, anticipation, and good marking to outwit the opposition, and, with [Leo] Merrett darting in and out of the packs to lead attacks from the wing, and the rucks functioning well, the bombardment was so intense that Essendon wilted.

The photograph, which also appeared on the cover of the Australian Post's $4.50 booklet of ten "Richmond Tigers" postage stamps issued in 1996 as part of the "centenary of the AFL" celebrations, has also been the basis for:

- The logo of The Footy Show,
- Mitch Mitchell's statue of Dyer at Punt Road Oval,
- A set of four paintings by John Balmain of Ron Todd, Jack Dyer, John Coleman, and Alex Jesaulenko, issued in 1996 to celebrate the VFL/AFL centenary. All were taken from photographs; Dyer's was taken from the photograph of his break to score his ninth goal. It was also painted by Darcy Doyle, which was also used on the front cover of Brian Hansen's 1996 book.

== Order of Australia Medal (OAM) ==
John Raymond Dyer was awarded the Medal of the Order of Australia in the General Division (OAM), in the 1990 Queen's Birthday Honours List, "for service to Australian Rules Football".

== See also ==
- AFL Team of the Century

== Bibliography ==
- Dyer, J., Captain Blood, as told to Brian Hansen, Paul, (London), 1965.
- Dyer, J. (St John, J. ed.), "Don't be Where the Ball Ain't: Celebrating the Immortal Humour and Wisdom of Football Legend Jack Dyer", New Holland Publications, (Chatswood), 2012. ISBN 1-742-57327-4
- Dyer, J. & Hansen, B., "'Captain Blood': Jack Dyer", pp. 205–302 in Dyer, J. & Hansen, B., Captain Blood's Wild Men of Football, Brian Edward Hansen, (Cheltenham), 1993. ISBN 0-646-14782-X
- Hanlon, Peter (14 August 2013). "With love, to Capt Blood". The Age.
- Hansen, B., The Jack Dyer Story: The Legend of Captain Blood, Brian Hansen Nominees, (Mount Waverley), 1996. ISBN 1-876151-01-3
- Hansen B: Tigerland: The History of the Richmond Football Club from 1885, Richmond Former Players and Officials Association, (Melbourne), 1989. ISBN 0-7316-5047-6
- Hansen, B. & Dyer, J., The Wild Men of Football, Volume III: If Ya Don't Mind Umpire!, B.E. Hansen, (Mount Waverley), 1995. ISBN 0-646-23042-5
- Hardy, Tony, Finding Jack Dyer: The Remarkable Story of 'Captain Blood': Legend of the Australian Football Hall of Fame, The Slattery Media Group, (Richmond), 2013. ISBN 978-0-98-750021-2
- Hogan P: The Tigers of Old: A Complete History of Every Player to Represent the Richmond Football Club between 1908 and 1996, Richmond FC, (Melbourne), 1996. ISBN 0-646-18748-1
- Ross, J. (ed), 100 Years of Australian Football 1897–1996: The Complete Story of the AFL, All the Big Stories, All the Great Pictures, All the Champions, Every AFL Season Reported, Viking, (Ringwood), 1996. ISBN 0-670-86814-0
- Wilmoth, P., Up Close: 28 Lives of Extraordinary Australians, Pan Macmillan, (Sydney), 2005. ISBN 1-4050-3657-5
- Richmond Football Club – Hall of Fame
