= Chris Newman (footballer) =

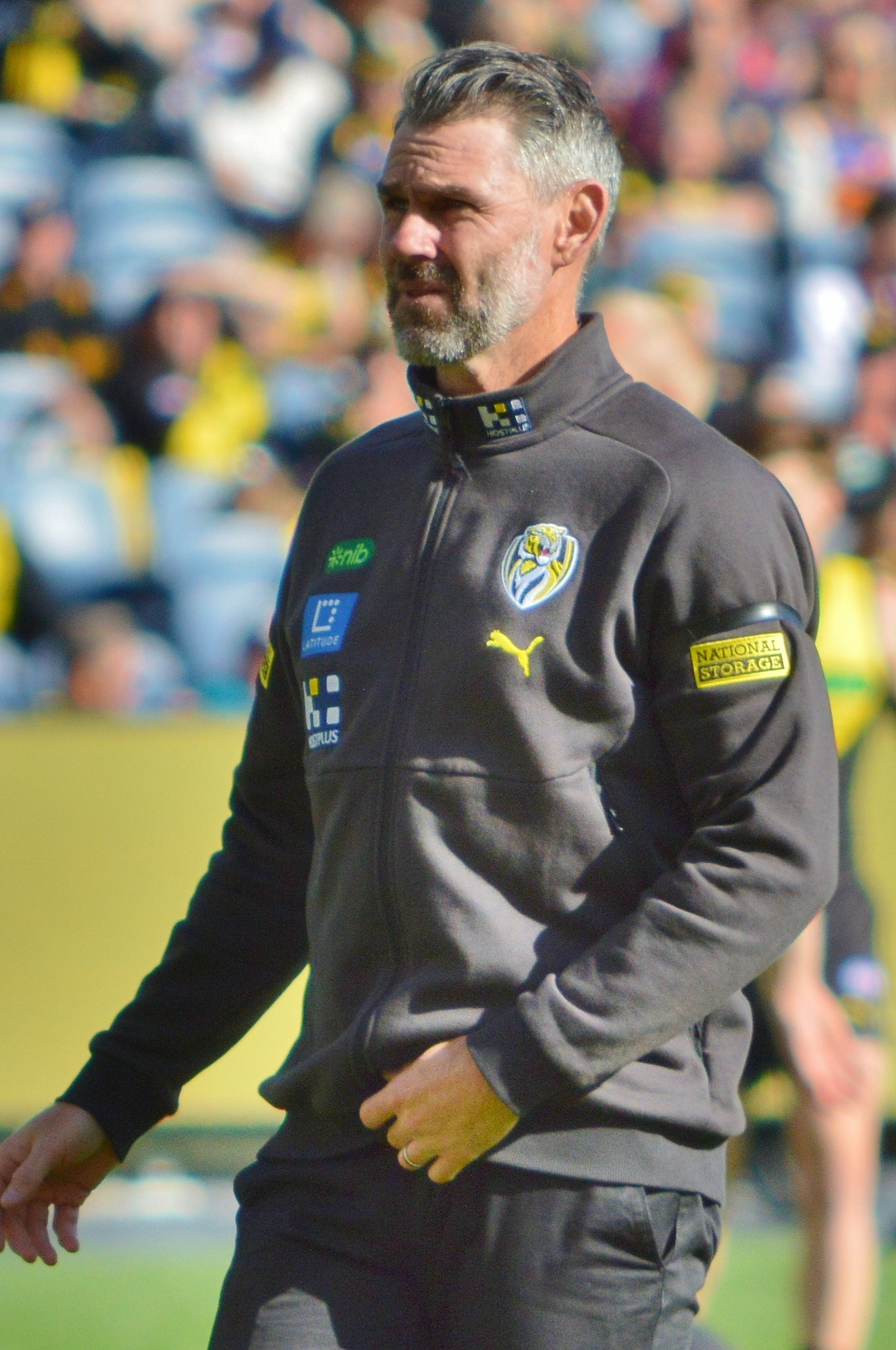
- Newman in April 2025

Personal information
- Full name: Christopher Newman
- Born: 18 May 1982 (age 44); Victoria
- Original teams: Beaconsfield (MPNFL); Dandenong Stingrays (TAC Cup)
- Draft: 55th overall, 2000; Richmond
- Height: 183 cm (6 ft 0 in)
- Weight: 82 kg (181 lb)
- Position: Defender

Playing career^{1}
Years	Club	Games (Goals)
2002–2015	Richmond	268 (56)

Coaching career^{3}
Years	Club	Games (W–L–D)
2017–2018	Box Hill	36 (25-10-1)
- ^{1} Playing statistics correct to the end of 2015.^{3} Coaching statistics correct as of 2018.

Career highlights
- Playing: Richmond captain: 2009–2012; Coaching: VFL Premiership coach: 2018; VFL coach of the year: 2017

Christopher Newman (born 18 May 1982) is the coach of the Box Hill Hawks in the Victorian Football League and a former player with the Richmond Football Club in the Australian Football League (AFL). He was drafted at pick 55 in the 2000 national draft from the Dandenong Stingrays in the TAC Cup. Newman grew up in the Melbourne suburb of Narre Warren where his neighbour and childhood friend was former AFL player Brendan Fevola. Newman led Box Hill to a VFL premiership in 2018 and formerly served as an assistant coach at Hawthorn in 2016.

== Playing career ==
=== Early career (2000-2004) ===
Newman struggled to get himself into the first Richmond side for his first two seasons. He was held back by nagging injuries, which meant he could not get any form.

After a strong run of form for the Coburg Tigers in the VFL, Newman made his debut for Richmond in Round 9 of the 2002 season. He was then to play every game except the Tigers' Round 22 game due to bad form for the previous month. He played every game though in the 2003 season and looked like he might have a career in the big league. He excelled as the Richmond team struggled, kicking 5 goals for the season and averaging 13 disposals off half back. In 2004, he played yet another good year. He played 19 games, once again averaging 13 disposals and also kicking 2 goals.

=== 2005 season ===
2005 was the break-through year for Newman. As Richmond struggled, Newman was very solid in the heart of their defence. He picked up a career high 24 disposals against Sydney in Round 14, in a stirring one point win over that season's premiers. He averaged 15 disposals for the year after playing every game, and kicked a couple of goals. Following the 2005 season, Newman was named in the Australian Squad for the 2005 International Rules Series, and performed well enough in the first test to be named in the bests.

=== 2006 season ===
2006 was a disappointing season for Newman despite a fairly strong start. After averaging 14 disposals for the first 12 games of the year, things went horribly wrong in round 13 against Collingwood. Newman, in an awkward collision with Leon Davis, broke his leg in two places. This was a similar break to that of fellow Richmond player Nathan Brown in 2005.

=== 2007 season ===
Newman was able to successfully recover from his broken leg and become one of Richmond's most consistent performers for the year. His run off the half-backline was crucial to the Tigers counter-attacking game plan.

He scored one of the goals of 2007 against Fremantle when he received a 50 m penalty which led him to the centre square after a scuffle with Dean Solomon. Newman kicked a long bomb from the centre square which was going to be the last goal of the 1st quarter. This goal was considered for nomination as one of the "Tiger Treasures of the Century" during Richmond's centenary celebrations in 2008.

=== 2008 season ===
In 2008, Newman was named as Richmond's Deputy Vice Captain along with Nathan Foley.

His 2008 season was statistically his best to date. He averaged 20.4 disposals per game whilst maintaining a solid level of defensive accountability. He won the Tigers' Most Courageous Player award and also managed a fourth-place finish in the Jack Dyer Medal.

On 19 November 2008, following his strong 2008 season, Newman was named Captain of the Richmond Football Club.

=== 2009-2012: Richmond's captain ===
From 2009 to 2012, Chris Newman was Richmond's captain and used as the key defensive playmaker for the Tigers. He is the 39th captain in Richmond's history.

During the 2012 season, he played his 200th game against Essendon, but announced that he would resign as captain at the conclusion of the 2012 season.

=== 2014 season ===
In August 2014, Newman played his 250th AFL game in which the Tigers defeated minor premiers the Sydney Swans by three points to win their ninth consecutive match and clinch the last place in the finals after the club languished in 16th place on the ladder after Round 14. In the lead-up to that match he signed a further contract which meant he would remain at the club until at least the end of the 2015 season.

=== 2015 season ===
Newman did not have the most successful start to the season and required minor heart surgery two weeks before the season opener against Carlton. There were serious doubts about him playing but the Tigers named him and he played. He announced in August 2015 that he would retire at the end of the season. He played his 268th and final match in a losing elimination final against North Melbourne at the MCG.

== Coaching career ==
On 20 October 2015, Newman joined Hawthorn as a development coach. In September 2016 it was announced he would move into the head coaching role at the Hawks' VFL affiliate, Box Hill in 2017. He was named the coach of the league's Team of the Year after leading Box Hill to second place in the home and away season in 2017. Newman lead Box Hill to the 2018 VFL premiership.

== Playing statistics ==
Legend
G	Goals	K	Kicks	D	Disposals	T	Tackles
B	Behinds	H	Handballs	M	Marks

Season	Team	No.	Games	Totals							Averages (per game)						
Season	Team	No.	Games	G	B	K	H	D	M	T	G	B	K	H	D	M	T
2002	Richmond	35	13	0	0	58	38	96	26	19	0.0	0.0	4.5	2.9	7.4	2.0	1.5
2003	Richmond	35	22	5	2	161	130	291	74	43	0.2	0.1	7.3	5.9	13.2	3.4	2.0
2004	Richmond	35	19	2	4	152	101	253	66	47	0.1	0.2	8.0	5.3	13.3	3.5	2.5
2005	Richmond	35	22	2	3	227	112	339	97	65	0.1	0.1	10.3	5.1	15.4	4.4	3.0
2006	Richmond	1	13	1	1	125	41	166	54	37	0.1	0.1	9.6	3.2	12.8	4.2	2.8
2007	Richmond	1	22	4	2	272	129	401	138	47	0.2	0.1	12.4	5.9	18.2	6.3	2.1
2008	Richmond	1	22	3	6	303	146	449	141	44	0.1	0.3	13.8	6.6	20.4	6.4	2.0
2009	Richmond	17	21	3	5	271	165	436	89	67	0.1	0.2	12.9	7.9	20.8	4.2	3.2
2010	Richmond	17	21	5	3	301	109	410	101	68	0.2	0.1	14.3	5.2	19.5	4.8	3.2
2011	Richmond	17	17	4	3	233	83	316	79	54	0.2	0.2	13.7	4.9	18.6	4.6	3.2
2012	Richmond	17	22	3	5	252	114	366	114	51	0.1	0.2	11.5	5.2	16.6	5.2	2.3
2013	Richmond	1	19	8	8	198	99	297	98	40	0.4	0.4	10.4	5.2	15.6	5.2	2.1
2014	Richmond	1	18	4	3	174	68	242	69	45	0.2	0.2	9.7	3.8	13.4	3.8	2.5
2015	Richmond	1	17	12	9	136	74	210	60	40	0.7	0.5	8.0	4.4	12.4	3.5	2.4
Career			268	56	54	2863	1409	4272	1206	667	0.2	0.2	10.7	5.3	15.9	4.5	2.5

== Achievements and honours ==
=== Playing honours ===
Individual

- Richmond captain: 2009–2012
- Australia international rules football team: 2005
- 100 Tiger Treasures "Goal of the Century" nominee: 2008

=== Coaching honours ===
Team

- VFL premiership: 2018

Individual

- VFL coach of the year: 2017
