= Ron Branton =

Australian rules footballer (1933–2024)

Personal information
- Full name: Ronald Neil Branton
- Born: 10 June 1933; Maryborough, Victoria, Australia
- Died: 30 May 2024 (aged 90)
- Original team: Maryborough
- Height: 170 cm (5 ft 7 in)
- Weight: 71 kg (157 lb)

Playing career^{1}
Years	Club	Games (Goals)
1953–1962	Richmond	170 (171)
- ^{1} Playing statistics correct to the end of 1962.

Career highlights
- Richmond Best and Fairest 1960, 1961, 1962; Richmond Leading Goalkicker 1953, 1954; Richmond Captain 1960-1962; Interstate Games:- 2; Richmond - Hall of Fame - inducted 2006

Ronald Branton (10 June 1933 – 30 May 2024) was an Australian rules football player who played in the VFL between 1953 and 1962 for the Richmond Football Club.

A rover from Maryborough, he won the best first year player in 1953, as well as the leading goalkicker award in his first two seasons. He is the only player to have won the Jack Dyer Medal in three consecutive years.

Branton played with Myrtleford in the Ovens & Murray Football League from 1963 to 1965 as their captain and coach, kicking 80 goals during that time.

Branton then played two seasons with King Valley Football Club in the Ovens & King Football League in 1966 and 1967, kicking 49 goals during that time.
