= Ted Ohlson =

Australian rules footballer (1886–1952)

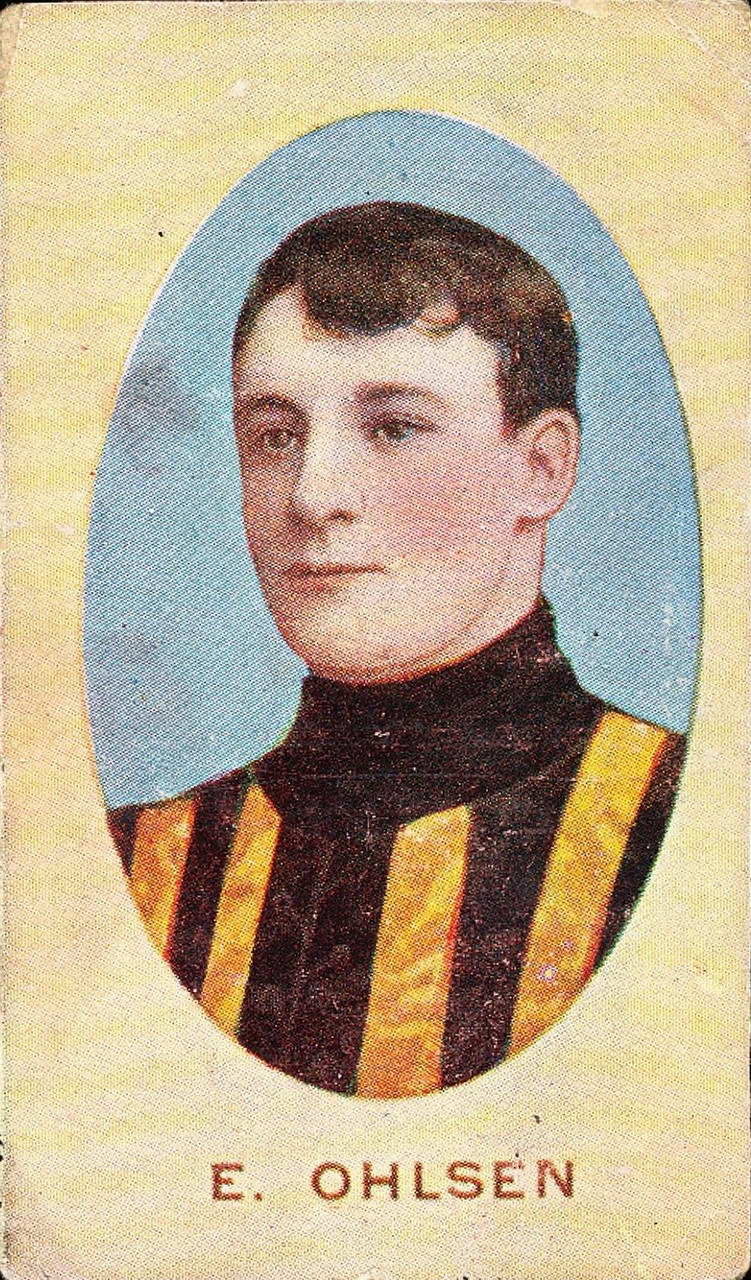
- Cigarette card of Ohlson in 1910

Personal information
- Full name: Frederick Henry Ohlson
- Born: 15 October 1886; Collingwood, Victoria
- Died: 28 October 1952 (aged 66); Coburg North, Victoria
- Original team: Rose of Northcote
- Height: 177 cm (5 ft 10 in)
- Weight: 83.5 kg (184 lb)

Playing career^{1}
Years	Club	Games (Goals)
1908–1915	Richmond	105 (36)
- ^{1} Playing statistics correct to the end of 1915.

Career highlights
- Richmond Captain 1912

Frederick Henry "Ted" Ohlson (15 October 1886 – 28 October 1952) was an Australian rules footballer who played for the Richmond Football Club in the VFL from 1908 to 1915.

== Family ==
The son of Philip Henry Ohlson (1863-1935), and Mary Jane Ohlson (1869-1954), née Wilson, Frederick Henry Ohlson was born at Collingwood, Victoria on 15 October 1886.

He married Mary Ellen McGuire (1885-1936) on 10 July 1920.

== Death ==
He died at his sister's house in North Coburg on 28 October 1952.
