= Bernie Nolan (footballer) =

Australian rules footballer

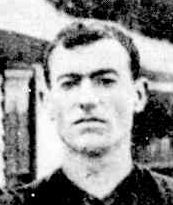
- Nolan in 1908

Personal information
- Full name: Bernard Nolan
- Born: 23 October 1883; Wyndham Vale, Victoria
- Died: 10 November 1978 (aged 95); East Melbourne, Victoria
- Position: Ruck

Playing career^{1}
| Years | Club | Games (Goals) |
| 1904–1910; 1912 | Melbourne | 84 (10) |

Coaching career^{3}
| Years | Club | Games (W–L–D) |
| 1918 | Richmond | 14 (5–9–0) |
- ^{1} Playing statistics correct to the end of 1912.^{3} Coaching statistics correct as of 1918.

Career highlights
- Melbourne captain: 1909

Bernard Nolan (23 October 1883 – 10 November 1978) was an Australian rules footballer who played for the Melbourne Football Club in the Victorian Football League (VFL) between 1904 and 1912. He was senior coach of the Richmond Football Club in 1918.
