= Tony Free =

Personal information
- Born: 27 June 1969 (age 57)
- Original team: Lalbert Football Club
- Height: 178 cm (5 ft 10 in)
- Weight: 79 kg (174 lb)

Playing career^{1}
Years	Club	Games (Goals)
1987–1996	Richmond	133 (46)
- ^{1} Playing statistics correct to the end of 1996.

Career highlights
- Richmond: Captain 1994–1996; Richmond Best and Fairest: 1989, 1993; Interstate Games: 2; Richmond Life Member: 2013; Richmond Hall of Fame: 2019

Tony Free (born 27 June 1969) is a former Australian rules footballer who played in the VFL/AFL between 1987 and 1996 for the Richmond Football Club. He played one game in the 1987 season (wearing No. 49) and then became a regular player from 1988 (wearing No. 30).

Free's career was cut short by a knee injury and he retired in 1996. His last game was against Geelong in round 5 of 1996. He captained the club for three seasons from 1994 and was appointed a Director of the club in June 2008. In December 2013, he became a Life Member of the club.

In 2019, Free was inducted into the Richmond 'Hall of Fame'.

== Publications ==
- Hogan P: The Tigers Of Old, Richmond FC, Melbourne 1996
