= Bill Thomas (Australian footballer) =

Australian rules footballer and coach (1886–1974)

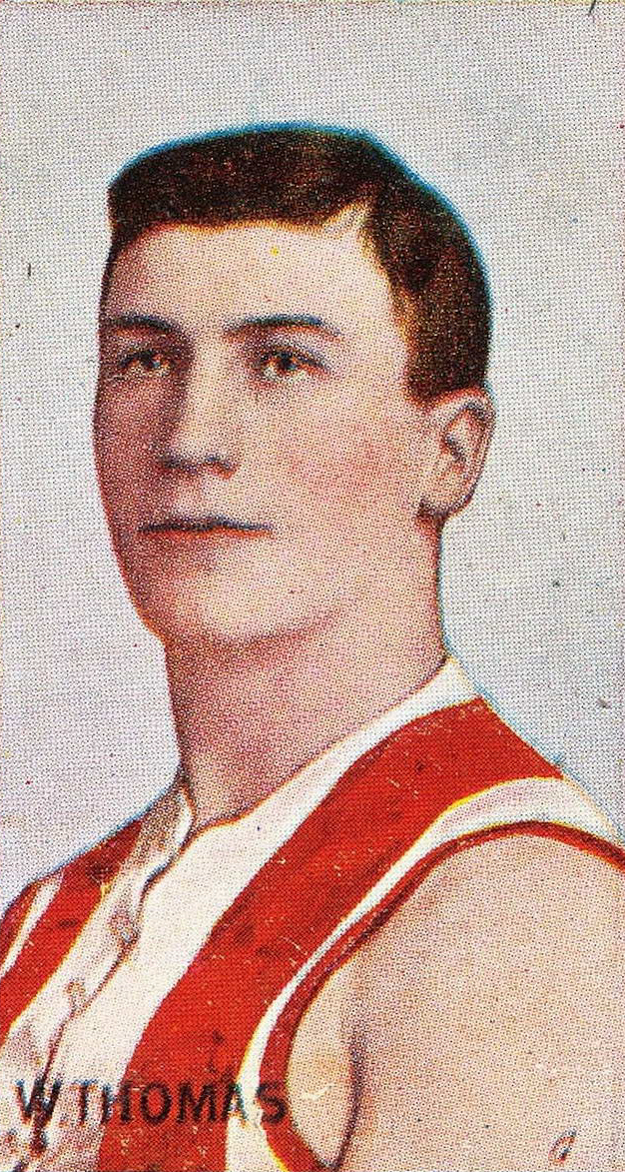
- Cigarette card of Thomas in 1908

Personal information
- Full name: William David Thomas
- Born: 10 November 1886; Melbourne, Victoria
- Died: 8 October 1974 (aged 87); Windsor, Victoria
- Original team: Carlton District/Rose of Northcote
- Height: 178 cm (5 ft 10 in)
- Weight: 77 kg (170 lb)

Playing career^{1}
Years	Club	Games (Goals)
1905–1913	South Melbourne	135 (2)
1914–1916; 1919	Richmond	62 (3)
Total		197 (5)

Coaching career
Years	Club	Games (W–L–D)
1910–1911	South Melbourne	39 (26–12–1)
- ^{1} Playing statistics correct to the end of 1919.

Career highlights
- South Melbourne premiership player 1909; South Melbourne captain-coach 1910–1911; Interstate games: 4; Victorian captain 1912; Richmond captain 1914–1916, 1919

William David Thomas (10 November 1886 – 8 October 1974) was an Australian rules footballer who played for the South Melbourne Football Club in the Victorian Football League (VFL) between 1906 and 1913 and then for the Richmond Football Club from 1914 to 1916 and again in 1919. His son Len Thomas was a premiership player for South Melbourne.

"Son", as he was nicknamed, was captain-coach of South Melbourne in 1910 and 1911 and was captain of Richmond for every game he played for them.
