= Len Incigneri =

Personal information
- Full name: Leonard Incigneri
- Born: 3 January 1884; Tyabb, Victoria
- Died: 23 August 1964 (aged 80); Queensland
- Original team: Mornington
- Height: 180 cm (5 ft 11 in)
- Weight: 89 kg (196 lb)

Playing career
Years	Club	Games (Goals)	
1903, 1905	South Melbourne	2 (0)	
1907–1911	Richmond	62 (4)	
1913–1915	Melbourne	33 (7)	

Representative team honours
Years	Team	Games (Goals)	
1911	Victoria		

Coaching career
Years	Club	Games (W–L–D)	
1911	Richmond	18 (7–11–0)	
1914	Melbourne	18 (2–16–0)	

Umpiring career
Years	League	Role	Games
1913	VFL	Field umpire	4 VCFL

Career highlights
- Richmond captain: 1911; Melbourne captain: 1914

Leonard "Len" Incigneri (3 January 1884 – 22 August 1964) was an Italian-Australian rules football player, umpire and coach. He played for South Melbourne Football Club and Melbourne Football Club in the Victorian Football League (VFL) and Richmond Football Club in both the Victorian Football Association (VFA) and the VFL. For a short period he was appointed to the VFL list of umpires. His brother Matt Incigneri was also an Australian rules footballer.

== Football career ==
Beginning his senior football career at Hastings in 1902 he moved with his brother to Somerville the following year where he played a single match before debuting a week later for the South Melbourne Football Club. He returned to Hastings in 1904 playing out the season. His second and final game for the Swans came in 1905.

Tyabb recruited Incigneri for the 1907 season but by May had received an offer from the Richmond then in the Victorian Football Association. He joined them and was part of the side that joined the VFL from 1908 to 1911, playing 63 games in four seasons for the club. In 1911 he was captain-coach. He also achieved selection in the VFL interstate team which competed in the 1911 ANFC Carnival held in Adelaide.

Prior to the start of the 1912 season he made an application to transfer to Melbourne but it was rejected by the Tigers and he returned to Hastings as captain for the year and led the team to the premiership. His service was recognised with the presentation of a gold watch at a dance in his honour that November.

Midway through 1913 Incigneri's application to join Melbourne was granted and he joined them on a tour of Tasmania. Showing good form on the trip he made his debut for them on 19 July. He impressed the club enough to be appointed captain-coach in 1914 and as captain only in 1915.

Incigneri's VFL career ended ingloriously on 7 August 1915. Playing South Melbourne at the Melbourne Cricket Ground Incigneri instigated a crowd invasion of the ground when he struck South ruckman George Payne rendering him unconscious. Play was halted for 15 minutes and Incigneri was reported by four umpires and the steward. At the tribunal he pleaded guilty, under provocation, and was suspended for eight weeks, effectively ending his playing career.

Further coaching success came in 1928 when he guided Somerville to their first ever premiership.

Incigneri was named in the back pocket in the Italian Team of the Century. He was the first person of Italian ancestry to coach in the VFL.

== Umpiring ==
Following the 1912 premiership with Hastings and prior to his clearance to Melbourne Incigneri was briefly appointed to the VFL list of field umpires. He officiated in four Victorian Country Football League matches: one in The Bacchus Marsh-Melton Football League and three in the Goulburn Valley Football League. He was not appointed to any senior VFL matches before leaving the list and joining Melbourne.

== Horse racing ==
Incigneri became a horse racing steward first in Gippsland then from 1938 in Brisbane. He retired as a steward in 1953.

== Death ==
Incigneri died on 23 August 1964 in Queensland. He was interred at the Nudgee cemetery.
