= Percy Maybury =

Australian rules footballer and coach

Personal information
- Full name: Percy Harold Maybury
- Born: 24 September 1891; Richmond, Victoria
- Died: 8 May 1963 (aged 71); Richmond, Victoria
- Original team: Richmond Boys/Yarra Park
- Height: 175 cm (5 ft 9 in)
- Weight: 73 kg (161 lb)

Playing career^{1}
Years	Club	Games (Goals)
1910–1919	Richmond	128 (61)
1920–1921	Footscray (VFA)	40 (0)

Coaching career
Years	Club	Games (W–L–D)
1917	Richmond	15 (3–11–1)
- ^{1} Playing statistics correct to the end of 1921.

Career highlights
- Richmond Captain/Coach 1917

Percy Harold Maybury (24 September 1891 – 8 May 1963) was an Australian rules footballer who played in the VFL between 1910 and 1919 for the Richmond Football Club.

== Football ==
In the match against University, at the MCG, on 30 May 1914, Maybury kicked six goals, all of them from place kicks.

He was Captain/Coach of Richmond for the 1917 season.
