= Des Rowe =

Australian rules footballer and coach

- Des Rowe among the Richmond players in 1961

Personal information
- Full name: Kenneth Desmond Rowe
- Born: 19 November 1925
- Died: 12 May 2007 (aged 81)
- Original team: Coburg
- Height: 182 cm (6 ft 0 in)
- Weight: 82.5 kg (182 lb)

Playing career^{1}
Years	Club	Games (Goals)
1946–1957	Richmond	175 (24)

Coaching career
Years	Club	Games (W–L–D)
1961–1963	Richmond	54 (15–39–0)
- ^{1} Playing statistics correct to the end of 1957.

Career highlights
- Richmond Best and Fairest 1951, 1955; Richmond Captain 1952–1957; Interstate Games: 7; Interstate Captain 1956; All-Australian 1956; Richmond – Team of the Century; Richmond – Hall of Fame – inducted 2004

Kenneth Desmond Rowe (19 November 1925 – 12 May 2007) was an Australian rules footballer who played in the Victorian Football League (VFL) between 1946 and 1957 for the Richmond Football Club. He was later senior coach of Richmond from 1961 to 1963.

== Family ==
The son of Collingwood player Percy Rowe (1896–1976), and Catherine Isobel Rowe (1899–1981), née Smith, Kenneth Desmond Rowe was born on 19 November 1925.

== Football ==
After a successful season with Coburg (where his father was the coach) in 1945, Rowe crossed to Richmond where he became one of the finest half backs in the VFL. A regular player for Victoria, Rowe earned All Australian selection at the 1956 Perth carnival. Rowe was made Richmond captain in 1952, a position he held until the end of his senior playing career.
