= Mel Morris =

Australian rules footballer and coach

Personal information
- Full name: Melville Arthur Leslie Morris
- Born: 8 June 1895; St Kilda, Victoria
- Died: 3 May 1956 (aged 60); Sassafras, Victoria
- Original team: Wesley College/Elsternwick FC
- Height: 178 cm (5 ft 10 in)
- Weight: 76 kg (168 lb)

Playing career^{1}
| Years | Club | Games (Goals) |
| 1921–1926 | Richmond | 89 (148) |

Coaching career
| Years | Club | Games (W–L–D) |
| 1926 | Richmond | 18 (9–9–0) |
- ^{1} Playing statistics correct to the end of 1926.

Career highlights
- Richmond Premiership Player 1921; Richmond Leading Goalkicker 1924, 1925; Richmond Captain/Coach 1926; Victorian Games:- 3

Melville Arthur Leslie Morris (8 June 1895 – 3 May 1956) was an Australian rules footballer who played in the VFL between 1921 and 1926 for the Richmond Football Club.

== Football ==
He was captain/coach of Richmond for the 1926 season.

== Broadcaster ans commentator ==
Morris was also a pioneer football commentator with the Australian Broadcasting Company and later the Australian Broadcasting Commission.

== Death ==
He died at Sassafras, Victoria on 3 May 1956.
