= Percy Bentley =

Australian rules footballer, born 1906

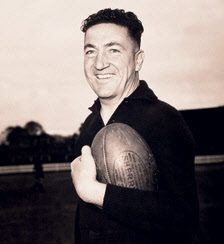
- Bentley in 1941

Personal information
- Full name: Percy Bentley
- Born: 13 December 1906; Castlemaine
- Died: 25 March 1982 (aged 75)
- Original team: Burnley Methodists
- Height: 183 cm (6 ft 0 in)
- Weight: 88 kg (194 lb)
- Position: Ruckman

Playing career^{1}
| Years | Club | Games (Goals) |
| 1925–1940 | Richmond | 263 (275) |

Representative team honours
| Years | Team | Games (Goals) |
| | Victoria | 6 |

Coaching career^{3}
| Years | Club | Games (W–L–D) |
| 1934–1940 | Richmond | 133 (86–46–1) |
| 1941–1955 | Carlton | 281 (167–110–4) |
| Total | | 414 (253–156–5) |
- ^{1} Playing statistics correct to the end of 1940.^{3} Coaching statistics correct as of 1955.

Career highlights
- Richmond premiership captain 1932; Richmond premiership captain-coach 1934; Carlton premiership coach 1945, 1947; Richmond captain 1932–1940; Australian Football Hall of Fame, inducted 1996

Percy Bentley (13 December 1906 − 25 March 1982) was an Australian rules footballer in the (then) Victorian Football League.

Bentley was a strong ruckman and great tactician who was a key player and coach for the Richmond Football Club during his era. He later coached Carlton Football Club during the 1940s and 1950s.

In 1996 Bentley was inducted into the Australian Football Hall of Fame.

== Career highlights ==
=== Playing career ===
- Richmond 1925–1940 (Games: 263 Goals: 272)

=== Player honours ===
- Richmond captain 1932–1940
- Richmond premierships 1932, 1934 (captain-coach)
- Victorian representative 6 matches

=== Coaching record ===
- Richmond 1934–1940 (133 games, 86 wins, 46 losses, 1 draw), Premiership 1934
- Carlton 1941–1955 (281 games, 167 wins, 110 losses, 4 draws), Premierships 1945, 1947.

== See also ==
- 1927 Melbourne Carnival
