= 1930 VFL grand final =

Grand final of the 1930 Victorian Football League season

1930 VFL Grand Final

| Geelong | Collingwood |
|---|---|
| 9.16 (70) | 14.16 (100) |
| | 1 | 2 | 3 | 4 |
|---|---|---|---|---|
| GEE | 2.5 (17) | 6.10 (46) | 6.11 (47) | 9.16 (70) |
| COLL | 3.2 (20) | 3.7 (25) | 11.13 (79) | 14.16 (100) |
- Date: 11 October 1930
- Stadium: Melbourne Cricket Ground
- Attendance: 45,022

The 1930 VFL grand final was an Australian rules football game contested between the Collingwood Football Club and Geelong Football Club, held at the Melbourne Cricket Ground in Melbourne on 11 October 1930. It was the 32nd annual grand final of the Victorian Football League, staged to determine the premiers for the 1930 VFL season. The match, attended by 45,022 spectators, was won by Collingwood by a margin of 30 points. It was the club's ninth premiership victory and fourth in succession. As of 2025, Collingwood is the only team in VFL/AFL history to win four consecutive premierships.

== Background ==
Collingwood finished on top of the ladder with 15 wins and 3 losses. Carlton was highly fancied to finish on top after winning 13 of its first 14 home-and-away games, but after losing two of its last four games finished second on percentage. Richmond, Geelong and Melbourne filled the next three positions, all with 11 wins.

Geelong upset Carlton in the first semi-final by 20 points, Carlton left to lament its inaccurate goalkicking by the score of 13.11 (89) def. 8.21 (69); and Collingwood defeated in Richmond by three points in a thrilling second semi-final. Geelong then upset Collingwood in the final by 26 points; Collingwood as minor premiers exercised its right to challenge under the Argus finals system setting up the grand final against Geelong.

== Match summary ==
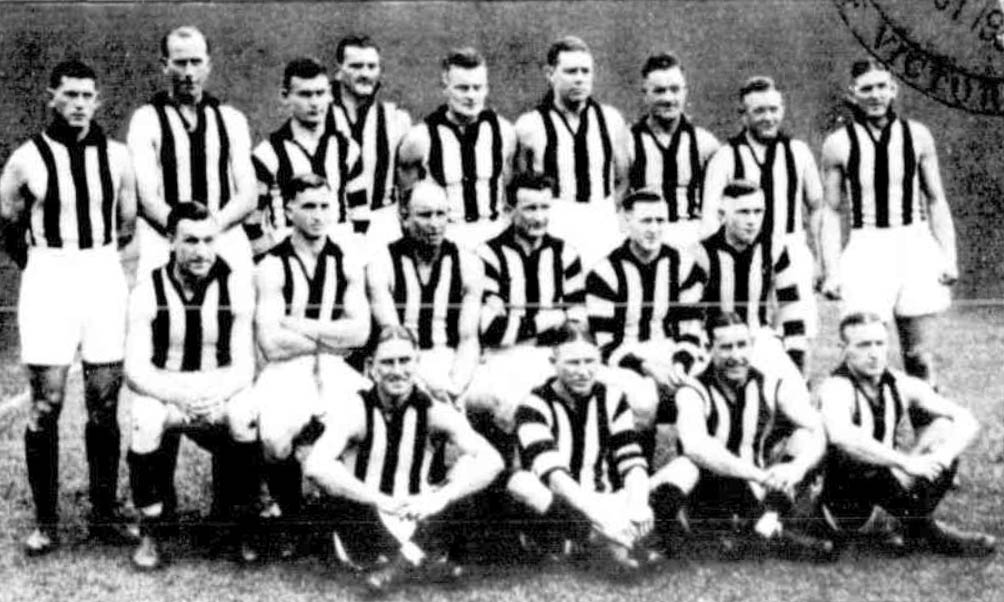
Collingwood FC team, premiers

Collingwood's famous coach, Jock McHale, could not attend the 1930 Grand Final, being confined to bed with the flu. Veteran administrator, club treasurer and former premiership player Bob Rush took charge in his place. Following a decision by AFL historians in 2014, McHale is credited as Collingwood's sole coach in the game for the purposes of coaching statistics.

Collingwood started the match aggressively, and seemed too intent on playing the man. Geelong, however, focused on the ball and kicked the goals. Their pace and work in the air saw them leading by 21 points at half time.

At half time, Rush delivered what Harry Collier recalled was one of the most inspirational speeches that he had ever heard, and the team produced one of the most dominant and important quarters in the club's history, coming from a 27-point deficit to lead by 32 at three-quarter time. Goals came from Gordon Coventry, Makeham, H Collier and Beveridge. Geelong had become "listless and ragged whereas Collingwood were tearing along in their best style". The Sun described the club's third term as "one of the finest ever seen in football... it was an object lesson to every team in rising to the occasion after being apparently beaten, and by sheer grit and magnificent teamwork, sweeping down every obstacle in their way of finals success."

Both teams kicked three goals in the final quarter, but Collingwood won by 30 points.

In winning four successive premierships from 1927 to 1930, Collingwood set a record that has not been equalled to date. The teams from this era became known as "The Machine" for the teamwork, efficiency and effectiveness with which they played.

== Match statistics ==
1930 VFL Grand Final
Saturday 11 October 1930 2:50pm | Collingwood | def. | Geelong | MCG (crowd: 45,022) | Report
3.2 (20); 3.7 (25); 11.13 (79); 14.16 (100) | Q1; Q2; Q3; Final | 2.5 (17); 6.10 (46); 6.11 (47); 9.16 (70) | Umpires: Scott; Gate: £2,061
7 G. Coventry; 2 Makeham; 1 Beveridge, H. Collier, Edmonds, Froude, L. Murphy | Goals | 3 Troughton; 2 Llewellyn; 1 L. Hardiman, Kuhlken, Rayson, Williams
Andrew, Clayden, H. Collier, G. Coventry, Makeham, F. Murphy | Best | Carney, Evans, Llewellyn, Mockridge, Todd, Troughton

== Teams ==
| Collingwood | Geelong |

Collingwood
| B: | Albert Lauder | Charlie Dibbs | Percy Bowyer |
| HB: | Harold Rumney | Albert Collier | George Clayden |
| C: | Bruce Andrew | Jack Beveridge | Harry Chesswas |
| HF: | Bob Makeham | Frank Murphy | Bill Aldag |
| F: | Horace Edmonds | Gordon Coventry | Harry Collier |
| Foll: | Syd Coventry (c) | Len Murphy | Billy Libbis |
| Res: | Fred Froude | | |
| Coach: | Jock McHale | | |

Geelong
| B: | Milton Lamb | George Todd | Frank Mockridge |
| HB: | Arthur Coghlan (c) | Reg Hickey | Rupe McDonald |
| C: | Frank Keppel | Jack Williams | Jack Carney |
| HF: | Arthur Rayson | Jack Collins | Les Hardiman |
| F: | Ted Llewellyn | Bill Kuhlken | Bob Troughton |
| Foll: | Peter Hardiman | Jack Evans | Len Metherell |
| Res: | Ralph Lancaster | | |
| Coach: | Arthur Coghlan | | |

== See also ==
- 1930 VFL season
