= 1931 VFL grand final =

Grand final of the 1931 Victorian Football League season

1931 VFL Grand Final

Geelong	Richmond
9.14 (68)	7.6 (48)
	1	2	3	4
GEE	2.3 (15)	5.6 (36)	8.11 (59)	9.14 (68)
RIC	1.2 (8)	4.5 (29)	5.5 (35)	7.6 (48)
- Date: 10 October 1931
- Stadium: Melbourne Cricket Ground
- Attendance: 60,712
- Umpires: Bob Scott
- Coin toss won by: Geelong
- Kicked toward: Punt Road End

The 1931 VFL Grand Final was an Australian rules football game contested between the Geelong Football Club and Richmond Football Club, held at the Melbourne Cricket Ground in Melbourne on 10 October 1931. It was the 33rd annual Grand Final of the Victorian Football League, staged to determine the premiers for the 1931 VFL season. The match, attended by 60,712 spectators, was won by Geelong by a margin of 20 points, making it the club's second VFL premiership victory. The triumph has become legendary because it was the first, and only, season that Geelong was coached by Charlie Clymo.

== Background ==
The teams had finished the home and away season with 15 wins each, with Geelong claiming the minor premiership and two victories over Richmond during the season. Richmond turned the tables and defeated Geelong by 33 points in the semi-final held two weeks prior, with Geelong recovering the following week to defeat Carlton by six points in the preliminary final, despite trailling by 47 points at quarter time.

== Match summary ==
Geelong centreman Edward Greeves

After winning the toss and electing to kick to the Punt Road End, Les Hardiman kicked the first goal for Geelong within the first two minutes of the match. In a hard and contested contest, scoring was limited in the first half, with neither team able to utilise the advantage of the strong breeze blowing towards the Punt Road goal, with Geelong kicking late goals into the wind to lead at half time by seven points. Geelong kicked away in the third quarter to set up the victory, taking advantage of the conditions to lead by 24 points going into the final quarter. Allan Geddes playing on the wing for Richmond was noted as his team's best player, with Jack Carney a matchwinner for Geelong, handily beating his opponent Stan Judkins.

Thus was the curtain rung down on the 1931 season — the season in which Geelong finished at the head of the list in the first round and capped that excellent performance by the finer one of winning another premiership pennant to float from their stand.

— The Geelong Advertiser, 12 October 1931

== Scoreboard ==
Grand Final
Saturday, 10 October (2:50 pm)	Geelong	def.	Richmond	MCG (crowd: 60,712)	Report
2.3 (15); 5.6 (36); 8.11 (59); 9.14 (68)	Q1; Q2; Q3; Final	1.2 (8); 4.5 (29); 5.5 (35); 7.6 (48)	Umpires: Bob Scott
Hardiman 2, Baker 2, Metherell 2, Troughton, Collins, Moloney	Goals	Strang 2, Titus 2, Dyer, Ford, Twyford
Carney, Hickey, Todd, Collins	Best	Geddes, O'Neill, Strang, Foster

== Teams ==
Geelong	Richmond

Geelong
B:	Milton Lamb	George Todd	Peter Hardiman
HB:	Rupe McDonald	Reg Hickey	Jack Williams
C:	Jack Carney	Edward Greeves	Jack Walker
HF:	Les Hardiman	Jack Collins	Bob Troughton
F:	Jack Evans	George Moloney	Tommy Quinn
Foll:	Arthur Coghlan	Len Metherell	Ted Baker (c)
Res:	Frank Mockridge		
Coach:	Charlie Clymo		

Richmond
B:	Kevin O'Neill	Joe Murdoch	Fred Heifner
HB:	Martin Bolger	Tom Dunne	Basil McCormack
C:	Stan Judkins	Eric Zschech	Allan Geddes
HF:	Jack Titus	Gordon Strang	Jack Twyford
F:	Jack Dyer	Doug Strang	Frank Ford
Foll:	Jack Bisset	Bert Foster	Maurie Hunter (c)
Res:	Thomas O'Halloran		
Coach:	'Checker' Hughes		

- Umpire – Bob Scott

== See also ==
- 1931 VFL season
