= 1937 VFL grand final =

Grand final of the 1937 Victorian Football League season

1937 VFL Grand Final

Geelong	Collingwood
18.14 (122)	12.18 (90)
	1	2	3	4
GEE	3.3 (21)	8.5 (53)	12.8 (80)	18.14 (122)
COLL	6.3 (39)	8.10 (58)	11.14 (80)	12.18 (90)
- Date: 25 September 1937
- Stadium: Melbourne Cricket Ground
- Attendance: 88,540

The 1937 VFL Grand Final was an Australian rules football game contested between the Geelong Football Club and Collingwood Football Club, held at the Melbourne Cricket Ground in Melbourne on 25 September 1937. It was the 39th annual grand final of the Victorian Football League, staged to determine the premiers for the 1937 VFL season. The match, attended by a then-record crowd of 88,540 spectators, was won by Geelong by a margin of 32 points, marking that club's third premiership victory and first since winning the 1931 VFL Grand Final.

Due to the excellent display of skills, as well as the vigorous but fair play, and the closeness of the contest that was not decided until late in the last quarter, this Grand Final was regarded by many contemporaries as the greatest ever played to that point.

== Background ==
Geelong took out the minor premiership by finishing with 15 wins from 18 games. A 12-point win over Melbourne saw Geelong advance to the grand final against reigning premiers Collingwood. Collingwood were backed as "hot favourites".

== Teams ==
Geelong	Collingwood

Geelong
B:	Bernie Hore	Reg Hickey (c)	Allan Everett
HB:	Jack Grant	Joe Sellwood	Tom Arklay
C:	Laurie Slack	Fred Hawking	Angie Muller
HF:	Jim Wills	Gordon Abbott	Clive Coles
F:	Jack Metherell	Les Hardiman	Jack Evans
Foll:	Peter Hardiman	George Dougherty	Tommy Quinn (vc)
Res:	Geoff Mahon		
Coach:	Reg Hickey		

Collingwood
B:	Harold Rumney	Jack Regan	Bervyn Woods
HB:	Jack Ross	Marcus Boyall	Fred Froude
C:	Jack Carmody	Marcus Whelan	Ron Dowling
HF:	Des Fothergill	Ron Todd	Vin Doherty
F:	Phonse Kyne	Gordon Coventry	Alby Pannam
Foll:	Albert Collier	Percy Bowyer	Harry Collier (c)
Res:	Len Murphy		
Coach:	Jock McHale		

== Match Summary ==
=== Game Summary ===
Collingwood captain Harry Collier won the toss and the Magpies kicked with a slight breeze. The Magpies raced to an early three-goal lead before Geelong cut the deficit to five points at the main break. Scores were level at three-quarter time before a six-goal to one final term saw the Cats take the flag.

=== Critical Reviews ===
The game was universally praised by the football media. In his match report for The Argus, former Melbourne star and Brownlow medallist Ivor Warne-Smith was particularly effusive about the fair nature of the spectacle:

It was all clean, open football that was a delight to watch and by giving such an exhibition of manly, fair play Geelong and Collingwood have set an example of the way to play the game which should be followed by other teams for all time.

== Scorecard ==
Team	1	2	3	4	Total
Geelong	3.3	8.5	12.8	18.14	18.14 (122)
Collingwood	6.3	8.10	11.14	12.18	12.18 (90)

=== Goal kickers ===
Geelong:

- Evans 6
- Coles 4
- Metherell 4
- Abbott 2
- Sellwood 1
- Wills 1

Collingwood:

- Todd 4
- Coventry 3
- Pannam 2
- Doherty 1
- Fothergill 1
- Kyne 1

== Aftermath ==
According to the Geelong Advertiser, the Geelong players were accorded a rousing public reception when they returned via a special evening train. However, two players were unable to board and had to wait at Spencer Street for the ordinary train back to Geelong.

== See also ==
- 1937 VFL season

== Bibliography ==
- Atkinson, Graeme; Atkinson, Brant (2009). The Complete Book of AFL Finals (4th ed.). The Five Mile Press. ISBN 9781742112756.
- The Official statistical history of the AFL 2004
- Ross, J. (ed), 100 Years of Australian Football 1897–1996: The Complete Story of the AFL, All the Big Stories, All the Great Pictures, All the Champions, Every AFL Season Reported, Viking, (Ringwood), 1996. ISBN 0-670-86814-0
