= 1941 VFL season =

45th season of the Victorian Football League (VFL)

1941 VFL premiership season
- Teams: 12
- Premiers: Melbourne; 5th premiership
- Minor premiers: Carlton; 10th minor premiership
- Brownlow Medallist: Norman Ware (Footscray)
- Sel Murray (North Melbourne)
- Matches played: 112
- Highest: 79,687

The 1941 VFL season was the 45th season of the Victorian Football League (VFL), the highest level senior Australian rules football competition in Victoria. The season featured twelve clubs, ran from 26 April until 27 September, and comprised an 18-game home-and-away season followed by a finals series featuring the top four clubs.

The premiership was won by the Melbourne Football Club for the fifth time and third time consecutively, after it defeated Essendon by 29 points in the 1941 VFL Grand Final.

== Background ==
In 1941, the VFL competition consisted of twelve teams of 18 on-the-field players each, plus one substitute player, known as the 19th man. A player could be substituted for any reason; however, once substituted, a player could not return to the field of play under any circumstances.

Teams played each other in a home-and-away season of 18 rounds; matches 12 to 18 were the "home-and-way reverse" of matches 1 to 7.

Once the 18 round home-and-away season had finished, the 1941 VFL Premiers were determined by the specific format and conventions of the Page–McIntyre system.

== Home-and-away season ==
=== Round 1 ===
Home team	Home team score	Away team	Away team score	Venue	Crowd	Date
St Kilda	12.20 (92)	South Melbourne	12.15 (87)	Junction Oval	15,000	26 April 1941
Footscray	13.15 (93)	Hawthorn	7.10 (52)	Western Oval	10,500	26 April 1941
Collingwood	11.11 (77)	Richmond	13.17 (95)	Victoria Park	17,500	26 April 1941
Carlton	15.12 (102)	Essendon	15.9 (99)	Princes Park	21,000	26 April 1941
North Melbourne	15.18 (108)	Geelong	15.17 (107)	Arden Street Oval	8,000	26 April 1941
Melbourne	13.12 (90)	Fitzroy	17.12 (114)	MCG	14,750	26 April 1941

=== Round 2 ===
Home team	Home team score	Away team	Away team score	Venue	Crowd	Date
Geelong	13.9 (87)	St Kilda	11.19 (85)	Kardinia Park	8,500	3 May 1941
Fitzroy	10.15 (75)	Footscray	16.17 (113)	Brunswick Street Oval	17,000	3 May 1941
Essendon	22.13 (145)	North Melbourne	16.12 (108)	Windy Hill	13,000	3 May 1941
South Melbourne	13.15 (93)	Melbourne	14.17 (101)	Lake Oval	12,000	3 May 1941
Hawthorn	13.17 (95)	Collingwood	17.16 (118)	Glenferrie Oval	9,000	3 May 1941
Richmond	13.12 (90)	Carlton	12.8 (80)	Punt Road Oval	28,000	3 May 1941

=== Round 3 ===
Home team	Home team score	Away team	Away team score	Venue	Crowd	Date
Geelong	13.19 (97)	Melbourne	16.12 (108)	Kardinia Park	7,800	10 May 1941
Footscray	16.4 (100)	South Melbourne	7.16 (58)	Western Oval	15,000	10 May 1941
Carlton	18.12 (120)	Hawthorn	10.13 (73)	Princes Park	9,000	10 May 1941
Richmond	18.15 (123)	North Melbourne	14.11 (95)	Punt Road Oval	13,000	10 May 1941
St Kilda	7.16 (58)	Essendon	16.7 (103)	Junction Oval	19,000	10 May 1941
Fitzroy	15.7 (97)	Collingwood	18.15 (123)	Brunswick Street Oval	14,000	10 May 1941

=== Round 4 ===
Home team	Home team score	Away team	Away team score	Venue	Crowd	Date
Melbourne	13.15 (93)	St Kilda	13.11 (89)	MCG	13,000	17 May 1941
Essendon	15.14 (104)	Richmond	14.8 (92)	Windy Hill	20,000	17 May 1941
Collingwood	14.11 (95)	Footscray	14.10 (94)	Victoria Park	16,000	17 May 1941
Hawthorn	13.16 (94)	Geelong	11.13 (79)	Glenferrie Oval	6,000	17 May 1941
South Melbourne	15.19 (109)	Fitzroy	12.10 (82)	Lake Oval	10,500	17 May 1941
North Melbourne	15.15 (105)	Carlton	16.23 (119)	Arden Street Oval	14,000	17 May 1941

=== Round 5 ===
Home team	Home team score	Away team	Away team score	Venue	Crowd	Date
Geelong	14.12 (96)	South Melbourne	13.25 (103)	Kardinia Park	6,000	31 May 1941
Footscray	14.21 (105)	North Melbourne	8.8 (56)	Western Oval	12,000	31 May 1941
Collingwood	19.13 (127)	Melbourne	26.11 (167)	Victoria Park	15,000	31 May 1941
Richmond	17.18 (120)	Fitzroy	15.8 (98)	Punt Road Oval	13,000	31 May 1941
Hawthorn	8.12 (60)	Essendon	23.18 (156)	Glenferrie Oval	10,000	31 May 1941
St Kilda	13.12 (90)	Carlton	15.18 (108)	Junction Oval	15,000	31 May 1941

=== Round 6 ===
Home team	Home team score	Away team	Away team score	Venue	Crowd	Date
North Melbourne	17.12 (114)	St Kilda	8.14 (62)	Arden Street Oval	6,500	7 June 1941
Footscray	20.12 (132)	Melbourne	14.20 (104)	Western Oval	16,000	7 June 1941
Fitzroy	17.14 (116)	Geelong	10.15 (75)	Brunswick Street Oval	7,000	7 June 1941
Carlton	13.21 (99)	Collingwood	11.16 (82)	Princes Park	18,500	7 June 1941
Richmond	17.15 (117)	Hawthorn	8.14 (62)	Punt Road Oval	8,500	7 June 1941
South Melbourne	8.13 (61)	Essendon	13.18 (96)	Lake Oval	15,000	7 June 1941

=== Round 7 ===
Home team	Home team score	Away team	Away team score	Venue	Crowd	Date
Hawthorn	6.20 (56)	South Melbourne	13.12 (90)	Glenferrie Oval	7,000	14 June 1941
Geelong	10.14 (74)	Richmond	10.15 (75)	Kardinia Park	7,000	14 June 1941
Essendon	9.24 (78)	Fitzroy	4.12 (36)	Windy Hill	14,000	14 June 1941
Collingwood	17.19 (121)	North Melbourne	16.15 (111)	Victoria Park	10,000	14 June 1941
St Kilda	15.14 (104)	Footscray	9.8 (62)	Junction Oval	20,000	14 June 1941
Melbourne	14.13 (97)	Carlton	19.10 (124)	MCG	29,000	16 June 1941

=== Round 8 ===
Home team	Home team score	Away team	Away team score	Venue	Crowd	Date
Richmond	10.13 (73)	St Kilda	6.11 (47)	Punt Road Oval	6,000	21 June 1941
Hawthorn	6.8 (44)	Melbourne	12.12 (84)	Glenferrie Oval	2,000	21 June 1941
Collingwood	8.12 (60)	Essendon	7.10 (52)	Victoria Park	6,000	21 June 1941
Carlton	10.17 (77)	Fitzroy	12.13 (85)	Princes Park	4,000	21 June 1941
South Melbourne	8.16 (64)	North Melbourne	6.6 (42)	Lake Oval	5,000	21 June 1941
Geelong	10.18 (78)	Footscray	13.15 (93)	Kardinia Park	5,000	21 June 1941

=== Round 9 ===
Home team	Home team score	Away team	Away team score	Venue	Crowd	Date
Richmond	15.13 (103)	South Melbourne	9.16 (70)	Punt Road Oval	15,000	28 June 1941
Fitzroy	21.19 (145)	Hawthorn	10.20 (80)	Brunswick Street Oval	7,000	28 June 1941
Essendon	18.12 (120)	Geelong	11.13 (79)	Windy Hill	10,000	28 June 1941
North Melbourne	17.14 (116)	Melbourne	20.9 (129)	Arden Street Oval	5,000	28 June 1941
St Kilda	12.11 (83)	Collingwood	16.10 (106)	Junction Oval	16,000	28 June 1941
Footscray	12.14 (86)	Carlton	15.11 (101)	Western Oval	21,000	28 June 1941

=== Round 10 ===
Home team	Home team score	Away team	Away team score	Venue	Crowd	Date
Footscray	12.13 (85)	Richmond	14.11 (95)	Western Oval	14,000	5 July 1941
Collingwood	10.12 (72)	South Melbourne	11.13 (79)	Victoria Park	7,500	5 July 1941
Carlton	12.25 (97)	Geelong	13.11 (89)	Princes Park	7,000	5 July 1941
North Melbourne	13.20 (98)	Hawthorn	6.14 (50)	Arden Street Oval	3,000	5 July 1941
St Kilda	12.4 (76)	Fitzroy	12.6 (78)	Junction Oval	7,000	5 July 1941
Melbourne	16.17 (113)	Essendon	9.11 (65)	MCG	17,000	5 July 1941

=== Round 11 ===
Home team	Home team score	Away team	Away team score	Venue	Crowd	Date
Melbourne	14.24 (108)	Richmond	8.13 (61)	MCG	21,000	12 July 1941
Hawthorn	13.12 (90)	St Kilda	9.15 (69)	Glenferrie Oval	4,000	12 July 1941
Fitzroy	18.15 (123)	North Melbourne	18.16 (124)	Brunswick Street Oval	8,000	12 July 1941
Essendon	15.14 (104)	Footscray	9.11 (65)	Windy Hill	15,000	12 July 1941
Geelong	7.16 (58)	Collingwood	14.12 (96)	Kardinia Park	7,500	12 July 1941
South Melbourne	16.13 (109)	Carlton	14.9 (93)	Lake Oval	14,000	12 July 1941

=== Round 12 ===
Home team	Home team score	Away team	Away team score	Venue	Crowd	Date
Geelong	13.21 (99)	North Melbourne	14.11 (95)	Kardinia Park	4,500	19 July 1941
Fitzroy	16.8 (104)	Melbourne	18.18 (126)	Brunswick Street Oval	8,000	19 July 1941
South Melbourne	14.12 (96)	St Kilda	8.6 (54)	Lake Oval	10,000	19 July 1941
Hawthorn	11.14 (80)	Footscray	15.12 (102)	Glenferrie Oval	5,000	19 July 1941
Richmond	10.14 (74)	Collingwood	13.14 (92)	Punt Road Oval	15,000	19 July 1941
Essendon	12.11 (83)	Carlton	18.14 (122)	Windy Hill	14,000	19 July 1941

=== Round 13 ===
Home team	Home team score	Away team	Away team score	Venue	Crowd	Date
Melbourne	18.16 (124)	South Melbourne	10.13 (73)	MCG	23,000	26 July 1941
Collingwood	22.20 (152)	Hawthorn	12.13 (85)	Victoria Park	4,000	26 July 1941
Carlton	12.11 (83)	Richmond	11.18 (84)	Princes Park	27,000	26 July 1941
St Kilda	18.14 (122)	Geelong	11.15 (81)	Junction Oval	4,000	26 July 1941
Footscray	15.20 (110)	Fitzroy	9.4 (58)	Western Oval	10,000	26 July 1941
North Melbourne	12.14 (86)	Essendon	17.8 (110)	Arden Street Oval	10,000	26 July 1941

=== Round 14 ===
Home team	Home team score	Away team	Away team score	Venue	Crowd	Date
North Melbourne	9.10 (64)	Richmond	10.7 (67)	Arden Street Oval	10,000	2 August 1941
Essendon	16.17 (113)	St Kilda	6.13 (49)	Windy Hill	10,000	2 August 1941
Collingwood	11.9 (75)	Fitzroy	8.9 (57)	Victoria Park	9,000	2 August 1941
Melbourne	19.14 (128)	Geelong	9.18 (72)	MCG	7,000	2 August 1941
South Melbourne	7.13 (55)	Footscray	10.21 (81)	Lake Oval	20,000	2 August 1941
Hawthorn	11.15 (81)	Carlton	16.25 (121)	Glenferrie Oval	7,500	2 August 1941

=== Round 15 ===
Home team	Home team score	Away team	Away team score	Venue	Crowd	Date
Geelong	22.12 (144)	Hawthorn	19.15 (129)	Kardinia Park	4,500	9 August 1941
Fitzroy	16.17 (113)	South Melbourne	11.14 (80)	Brunswick Street Oval	8,000	9 August 1941
Carlton	25.19 (169)	North Melbourne	17.15 (117)	Princes Park	10,000	9 August 1941
St Kilda	12.13 (85)	Melbourne	14.17 (101)	Junction Oval	7,000	9 August 1941
Richmond	14.11 (95)	Essendon	12.16 (88)	Punt Road Oval	26,000	9 August 1941
Footscray	7.10 (52)	Collingwood	10.21 (81)	Western Oval	16,000	9 August 1941

=== Round 16 ===
Home team	Home team score	Away team	Away team score	Venue	Crowd	Date
Fitzroy	14.15 (99)	Richmond	12.16 (88)	Brunswick Street Oval	11,000	16 August 1941
Essendon	19.17 (131)	Hawthorn	14.9 (93)	Windy Hill	7,000	16 August 1941
Carlton	20.17 (137)	St Kilda	11.14 (80)	Princes Park	8,000	16 August 1941
South Melbourne	10.10 (70)	Geelong	10.9 (69)	Lake Oval	4,000	16 August 1941
North Melbourne	15.14 (104)	Footscray	11.22 (88)	Arden Street Oval	8,000	16 August 1941
Melbourne	17.8 (110)	Collingwood	11.21 (87)	MCG	31,000	16 August 1941

=== Round 17 ===
Home team	Home team score	Away team	Away team score	Venue	Crowd	Date
Hawthorn	8.12 (60)	Richmond	18.22 (130)	Glenferrie Oval	8,000	23 August 1941
Essendon	12.23 (95)	South Melbourne	7.4 (46)	Windy Hill	9,000	23 August 1941
St Kilda	16.18 (114)	North Melbourne	21.10 (136)	Junction Oval	6,000	23 August 1941
Melbourne	17.20 (122)	Footscray	16.9 (105)	MCG	12,000	23 August 1941
Geelong	13.16 (94)	Fitzroy	16.13 (109)	Kardinia Park	4,500	23 August 1941
Collingwood	10.21 (81)	Carlton	11.17 (83)	Victoria Park	30,000	23 August 1941

=== Round 18 ===
Home team	Home team score	Away team	Away team score	Venue	Crowd	Date
Footscray	16.14 (110)	St Kilda	13.17 (95)	Western Oval	7,000	30 August 1941
Carlton	16.17 (113)	Melbourne	11.22 (88)	Princes Park	29,000	30 August 1941
South Melbourne	7.12 (54)	Hawthorn	11.17 (83)	Lake Oval	3,000	30 August 1941
Richmond	20.12 (132)	Geelong	12.11 (83)	Punt Road Oval	9,000	30 August 1941
Fitzroy	15.16 (106)	Essendon	18.14 (122)	Brunswick Street Oval	11,000	30 August 1941
North Melbourne	12.8 (80)	Collingwood	13.20 (98)	Arden Street Oval	5,000	30 August 1941

== Ladder ==
(P)	Premiers
	Qualified for finals

#	Team	P	W	L	D	PF	PA	%	Pts
1	Carlton	18	14	4	0	1948	1619	120.3	56
2	Melbourne (P)	18	14	4	0	1993	1701	117.2	56
3	Richmond	18	14	4	0	1714	1469	116.7	56
4	Essendon	18	13	5	0	1864	1431	130.3	52
5	Collingwood	18	12	6	0	1743	1571	110.9	48
6	Footscray	18	10	8	0	1676	1517	110.5	40
7	Fitzroy	18	8	10	0	1695	1760	96.3	32
8	South Melbourne	18	8	10	0	1397	1552	90.0	32
9	North Melbourne	18	6	12	0	1759	1893	92.9	24
10	Geelong	18	3	15	0	1561	1880	83.0	12
11	St Kilda	18	3	15	0	1454	1775	81.9	12
12	Hawthorn	18	3	15	0	1367	2003	68.2	12

Rules for classification: 1. premiership points; 2. percentage; 3. points for
Average score: 93.4
Source: AFL Tables

== Finals series ==
=== Semi-finals ===
Home team	Score	Away team	Score	Venue	Crowd	Date
Richmond	11.15 (81)	Essendon	21.9 (135)	MCG	57,741	6 September
Carlton	11.16 (82)	Melbourne	16.13 (109)	MCG	59,435	13 September

=== Preliminary final ===
Home team	Score	Away team	Score	Venue	Crowd	Date
Carlton	9.14 (68)	Essendon	13.15 (93)	MCG	65,105	20 September

== Season notes ==
- Owing to the military takeover of Corio Oval, Geelong moved its home games to Kardinia Park.
- During March, the players of the Geelong Football Club went on strike and refused to train over a pay dispute. The players were seeking £3 per week, but the club was offering £1/10/– per week, which upset the players as they had received pay cuts in 1940 (from £3 to £1) when the club had made the finals and finished the year in a strong financial position. In response, the club claimed the lower offer was due to the extra expense of moving from Corio Oval to Kardinia Park, and increased payments to war funds drove the decision. The majority of players acquiesced and accepted the £1/10/– offer, but five senior players did not. Three of those crossed to the Victorian Football Association without a clearance – Allan Everett going to Preston, Bernie Hore going to Coburg, and Alan "Nipper" Marsham to Williamstown – while the other two, George Dougherty and Tom Arklay, having trained in the pre-season with the VFA clubs Coburg and Preston (respectively), eventually returned to play with Geelong in the 1941 season.
- In the Round 2 match between Carlton and Richmond, 11 players were injured, while highly talented Carlton rover Jack Hale, who broke his leg in an accidental collision with Richmond centreman Bernie Waldron, never played again.
- The VFL postponed its Round 5 matches and conducted its second patriotic lightning carnival at the Melbourne Cricket Ground on Saturday 24 May 1941. Collingwood won the carnival, defeating Melbourne 3.2 (20) to 3.1 (19). The carnival raised £1,526 for the war effort.
- On 31 July 1941, Melbourne rover Ron Barassi Sr. was killed in action at the Siege of Tobruk. He was the first VFL player to be killed in the Second World War. On 16 August 1941, a brief, moving memorial tribute to Barassi was conducted (including a bugler playing "The Last Post") at the Melbourne Cricket Club by spectators, players, trainers, and officials of Melbourne and Collingwood.
- In the last minutes of the last quarter of the Second Eighteens Grand Final, played at the MCG on 27 September 1941, which Essendon, captain-coached ex-Collingwood player Harry Collier, won (beating Fitzroy 12.16 (88) to 9.17 (71)), a Fitzroy player felled an Essendon player and fights broke out all over the ground. As the final bell was sounding, a vicious bench-clearing brawl broke out involving almost every player, with many of the players felled by punches and kicks. Both teams were reported for "unseemly conduct", and following the VFL investigation committee's hearing conducted on 14 October 1941, each club was fined £10.
- In a lop-sided senior Grand Final, Melbourne, missing at least twelve of its 1941 senior players through either injury or military service, was 47 points ahead at three quarter time, and went on to beat Essendon by 29 points: 19.13 (127) to 13.20 (98).
- After defeating Collingwood in Round 5, Carlton had a winning record over every other team in the competition in combined regular season and finals matches. They would hold this distinction until Round 8 of the 1954 VFL season.

== Awards ==
- The 1941 VFL Premiership team was Melbourne.
- The VFL's leading goalkicker was Sel Murray of North Melbourne with 88 goals.
- The winner of the 1941 Brownlow Medal was Norman Ware of Footscray with 23 votes. He was the only playing coach to achieve the feat.
- Hawthorn took the "wooden spoon" in 1941.
- The seconds premiership was won by Essendon. Essendon 12.16 (88) defeated Fitzroy 9.17 (71) in the Grand Final, played as a curtain-raiser to the senior Grand Final on Saturday 27 September at the Melbourne Cricket Ground.

== Sources ==
- 1941 VFL season at AFL Tables
- 1941 VFL season at Australian Football
