= 1932 VFL grand final =

Grand final of the 1932 Victorian Football League season

1932 VFL Grand Final

Carlton	Richmond
12.11 (83)	13.14 (92)
	1	2	3	4
CAR	2.3 (15)	5.6 (36)	7.11 (53)	12.11 (83)
RIC	3.3 (21)	7.9 (51)	8.12 (60)	13.14 (92)
- Date: 1 October 1932
- Stadium: Melbourne Cricket Ground
- Attendance: 69,724

The 1932 VFL grand final was an Australian rules football game contested between the Richmond Football Club and Carlton Football Club, held at the Melbourne Cricket Ground in Melbourne on 1 October 1932. It was the 34th annual grand final of the Victorian Football League, staged to determine the premiers for the 1932 VFL season. The match, attended by 69,724 spectators, was won by Richmond by a margin of 9 points. Richmond was competing in its fifth grand final in six years, and, after losing the previous four, finally claimed its third VFL/AFL premiership victory.

== Score ==
Team	1	2	3	Final
Richmond	3.3	7.9	8.12	13.14 (92)
Carlton	2.3	5.6	7.11	12.11 (83)

== Teams ==
Richmond	Carlton

Richmond
B:	Martin Bolger	Maurie Sheahan	Kevin O'Neill
HB:	Jack Baggott	Joe Murdoch	Basil McCormack
C:	Stan Judkins	Eric Zschech	Allan Geddes
HF:	Jack Twyford	Gordon Strang	Jack Titus
F:	Fred Heifner	Doug Strang	Maurie Hunter
Foll:	Percy Bentley (c)	Thomas O'Halloran	Ray Martin
Res:	Jack Anderson		
Coach:	'Checker' Hughes		

Carlton
B:	Jim Crowe	Frank Gill	Charlie Street
HB:	Eric Huxtable	Gordon Mackie	Fred Gilby
C:	Joe Kelly	Colin Martyn (c)	Leo Opray
HF:	Keith Shea	Alf Egan	Mickey Crisp
F:	Horrie Bullen	Harry Vallence	Ron Cooper
Foll:	Charlie Davey	Maurie Johnson	Ansell Clarke
Res:	Jack Young		
Coach:	Dan Minogue		

- Umpire – Bob Scott

== Statistics ==
=== Goalkickers ===
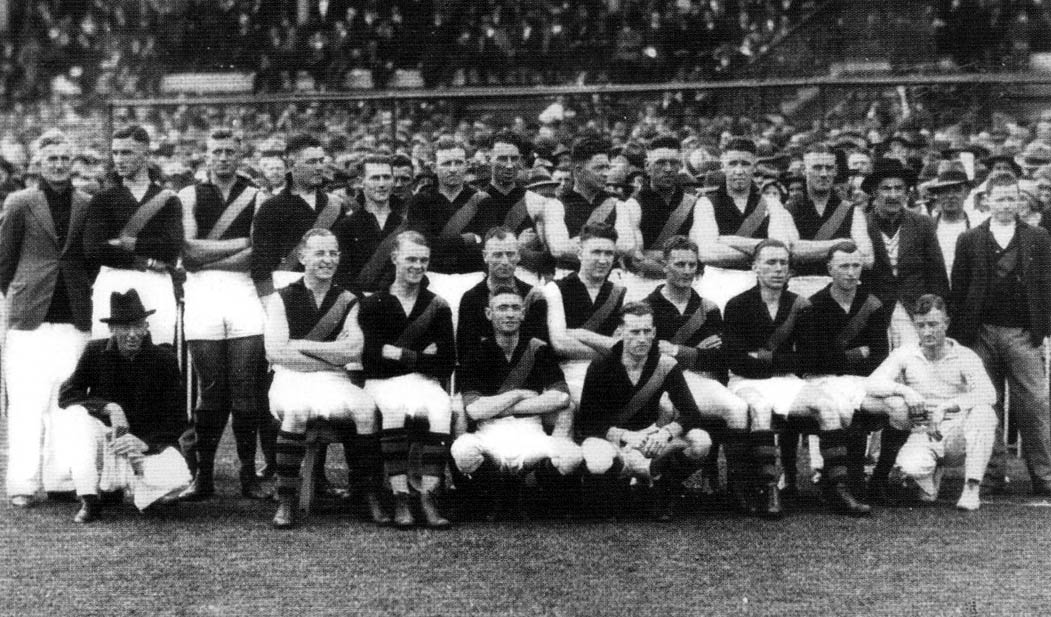
Richmond FC, premier team

Richmond:

- D.Strang 4
- Titus 2
- Anderson 1
- Bentley 1
- Heifner 1
- Hunter 1
- Martin 1
- O'Halloran 1
- G.Strang 1

Carlton:

- Vallence 5
- Bullen 2
- Clarke 2
- Shea 2
- Crisp 1

== See also ==
- 1932 VFL season
