= 1929 VFL grand final =

Grand final of the 1929 Victorian Football League season

1929 VFL Grand Final

Collingwood	Richmond
11.13 (79)	7.8 (50)
	1	2	3	4
COLL	6.3 (39)	7.6 (48)	9.6 (60)	11.13 (79)
RICH	2.0 (12)	3.3 (21)	5.5 (35)	7.8 (50)
- Date: 28 September 1929
- Stadium: Melbourne Cricket Ground
- Attendance: 63,236

The 1929 VFL grand final was an Australian rules football game contested between the Collingwood Football Club and Richmond Football Club, held at the Melbourne Cricket Ground in Melbourne on 28 September 1929. It was the 31st annual grand final of the Victorian Football League, staged to determine the premiers for the 1929 VFL season. The match, attended by 63,236 spectators, was won by Collingwood by a margin of 29 points, marking that club's eighth premiership victory and third in succession.

== History ==
Collingwood’s 1929 season was extremely successful. They won all 18 games of the home-and-away season, the only club to achieve the feat as of 2024; Gordon Coventry became the first player to kick 100 goals in a season (124 in total), and Albert Collier won the Brownlow Medal.

While Collingwood finished on top of the ladder, Carlton was second with 15 wins, Richmond third with 12 wins and a draw and St Kilda fourth with 12 wins. The second semi-final saw a massive upset, with the rugged and determined Richmond beating the undefeated Collingwood by 62 points. Richmond went on to beat Carlton in the preliminary final with a thrilling finish, Richmond kicking 3.1 (19) in the final five minutes of the match to convert a 13-point deficit into a six-point victory. As minor premiers under the Argus finals system, Collingwood had the right of challenge, and thus the grand final was scheduled between Collingwood and Richmond. It was the third consecutive year that the two clubs had faced off in the grand final.

In the week leading up to the match, Collingwood received handwritten anonymous letters, threatening the lives of eleven prominent players. They were intercepted by officials and withheld from the players until after the game.

== Match summary ==
Richmond kicked the first goal of the day but wasted opportunities for the rest of the quarter. Collingwood took advantage and led by 27 points at half time, a lead they held for the rest of the match. The two teams fought determinedly and, quite often, outside the spirit of the game. Bob Makeham was knocked senseless in the second quarter, although he played on despite concussion.

While Gordon Coventry kicked only two goals for the day, the attention that the Richmond defence paid him allowed Horrie ‘Tubby’ Edmonds to fulfill the most important day of his footballing life, kicking five goals playing deep near the boundary line in attack.

Charlie Ahern, 24 years old and playing in only his third VFL match, provided inspiration to the side. His main role was to protect Syd Coventry and, despite fracturing his arm, he battled on manfully, and held his own in what was, at times, a physically spiteful match. It was Ahern's last senior match, and he died only 18 months later from rectal cancer.

Collingwood won by 29 points, attributable to the Magpies’ rock-solid defence, Edmonds' five goals and that players carried on in the face of serious injuries.

== Match statistics ==
	1st	2nd	3rd	Final
Collingwood	6.3	7.6	9.6	11.13 (79)
Richmond	2.0	3.3	5.5	7.8 (50)

Best	Collingwood	Libbis, Wescott, S Coventry, Ahern, Clayden, Dibbs, A Collier, Edmonds
	Richmond	Murdoch, Bentley, Geddes, Watson, Empey, Weidner, Harris
Goals	Collingwood	Edmonds (5), G Coventry (2), H Collier, Libbis, F Murphy, L Murphy
	Richmond	Baggott (2), Weidner (2), Geddes, O’Halloran, Lilburne

- Umpire – R Scott
- Attendance – 63,366
- Gate – £3,227

== Teams ==
Collingwood	Richmond

Collingwood
B:	Leo Wescott	Charlie Dibbs	George Clayden
HB:	Albert Lauder	Albert Collier	Harold Rumney
C:	Harry Chesswas	Jack Beveridge	Percy Bowyer
HF:	Frank Murphy	Len Murphy	Bob Makeham
F:	Horace Edmonds	Gordon Coventry	Harry Collier
Foll:	Syd Coventry (c)	Charlie Ahern	Billy Libbis
Coach:	Jock McHale		

Richmond
B:	Fred Heifner	Bill Benton	Don Harris
HB:	Tom Dunne	Joe Murdoch	Maurie Sheahan
C:	Allan Geddes	Cyril Lilburne (c)	Carl Watson
HF:	Ralph Empey	Thomas O'Halloran	Harry Weidner
F:	Jack Fincher	Jack Baggott	Jack Titus
Foll:	Percy Bentley	Stan Ryan	Maurie Hunter
Coach:	Checker Hughes		

== See also ==
- 1929 VFL season
