= Cobden Football Club =

Cobden

Names
- Full name: Cobden Football Netball Club
- Nickname: Bombers

2025 season
- Home-and-away season: 9th
- Leading goalkicker: Michael Koroneos (34)
- Best and fairest: Sam Lucas

Club details
- Founded: 1879; 147 years ago
- Colours
- Competition: Hampden FNL
- President: James Green
- Coach: Brody Mahoney
- Premierships: 8 (1891, 1915, 1930, 1933, 1948, 1949, 1997, 1998)
- Ground: Cobden Recreation Reserve

Uniforms
Home

Other information
- Official website: cobdenfnc.com.au

The Cobden Football Netball Club, nicknamed the Bombers, is an Australian rules football and netball club based in the town of Cobden, Victoria. The club teams currently compete in the Hampden Football Netball League, which Cobden is a founding club, with its football squad having played there since 1930.

== History ==
The first Australian Rules Football match played in Cobden was in July 1879 between Cobden and Terang.

Cobden Football Club played in the Corangamite Football Association between 1911 and 1923.

Bewtween 1923 and 1929, Cobden played in the Western District Football League.

Cobden Football Club joined the newly formed Hampden Football League in 1930.

== Premierships ==
Senior Football

- Corangamite Football Association (2):
  - 1891 - ?
  - 1915 - Cobden: 7.5 - 47 d Terang: 5.12 - 42
- Hampden Football Netball League (6):
  - 1930 - Cobden: 13.9 - 87 d Terang: 6.30 - 66
  - 1933 - Cobden: 6.13 - 49 d South Warrnambool: 6.6 - 42
  - 1948 - Cobden:11.13 - 79 d South Warrnambool: 10.6 - 66
  - 1949 - Cobden: 11.13 - 79 d Colac: 7.11 - 53
  - 1997 - Cobden: 28.10 - 178 d Port Fairy: 13.12 - 90
  - 1998 - Cobden: 15.6 - 96 d South Warrnambool: 11.10 - 76

Reserves

- 1955, 1956, 1963, 1980, 1981, 1991, 2013,

Thirds

- 1949, 1950, 1959, 1960, 1983, 2015, 2016

== Hampden FNL Best & Fairest Winners ==
Senior Football

- Hampden Football Netball League - Maskell Medallists
- 1952 - John Couttie
- 1970, 1972 & 1979 - Hugh Worrall
- 1985 - Peter Anson
- 1996 - Stephen Hammond
- 1998 - Wayne Robertson
- 2010, 2012 & 2016 - Levi Dare
- 2012 - Joseph Dare

Reserves

- Hampden Football Netball League - Lew Kelly Medallists
- 1960 - Mick Rantall
- 1973 - Des Darcy
- 1976 - Ken Holland
- 1980 - Ian Russell
- 1982 - Harry Uwland
- 1997 - Paul Marshall
- 1998 & 2001 - Trevor Clarke
- 2010 - Simon Morris

Thirds

- Hampden Football Netball League - Judd Cup
- 1958 - Dan Rohan
- 1959 - Max Reed
- 1961 - John Rantall
- 1980 - Barry Castle
- 1992 - Brett Taylor
- 2001 - Ashley Couch
- 2004 - Rohan Couch
- 2017 - Lachlan Davis

== Hampden FNL - Leading Goalkickers ==
Seniors

- Hampden Football Netball League
- 1930 - Kevin Scanlan: (102)
- 1939 - Keith Wade: (88)
- 1947 - Vic Jones: (41)
- 1948 - Vic Jones: (64)
- 1958 - Gavin Moran: (71)
- 1979 - Chris Nash: (83)
- 1993 - Chris Fleming: (127)
- 2003 - Sean Lever: (54)

Reserves

- 1976 - P Maskell: 35
- 1980 - Fred Twynstra:71
- 1988 - N Frusher: 32

Thirds

- 1979 - Fred Twynstra: 45

== Notable players ==
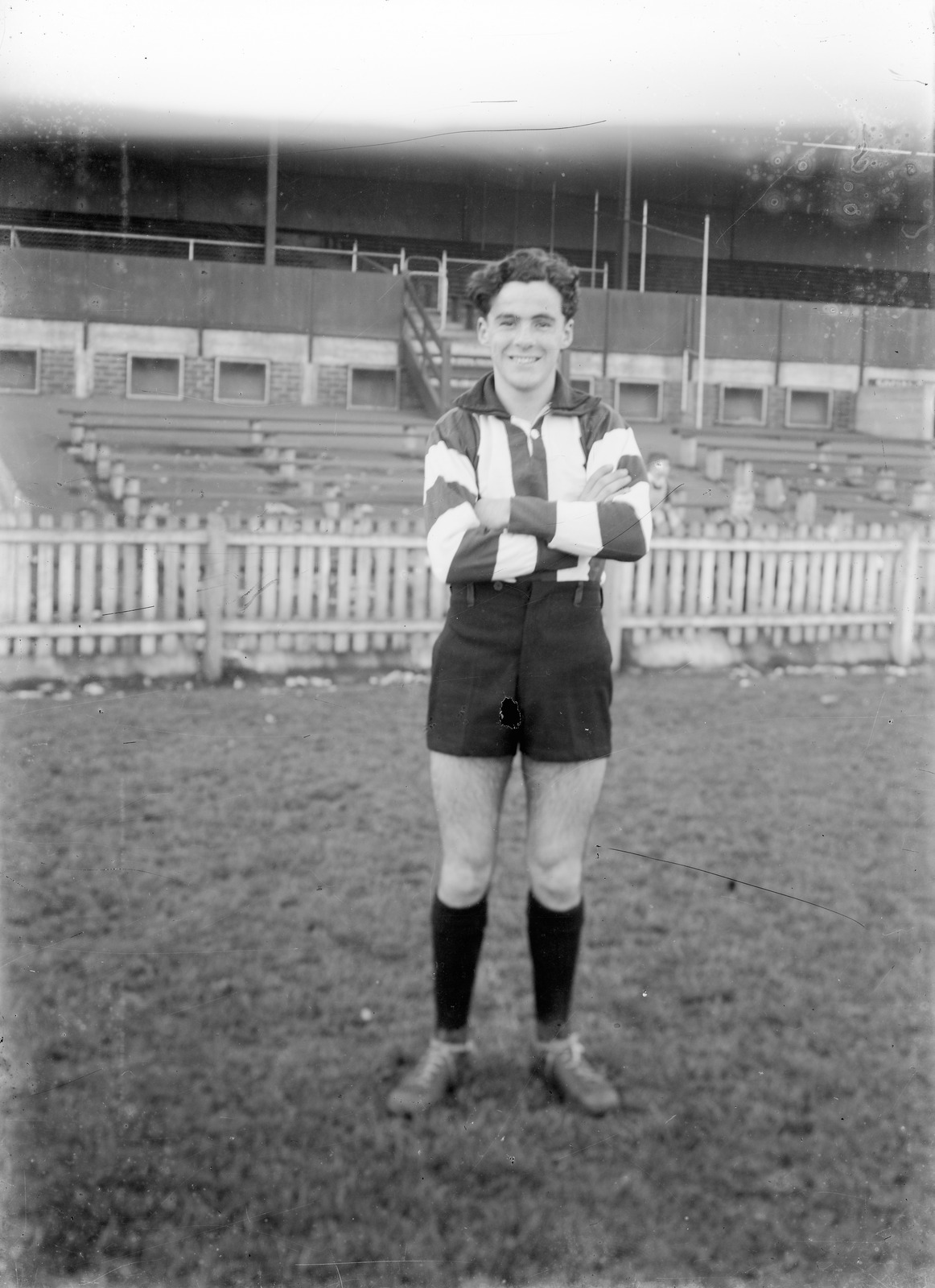
Thorold Merrett

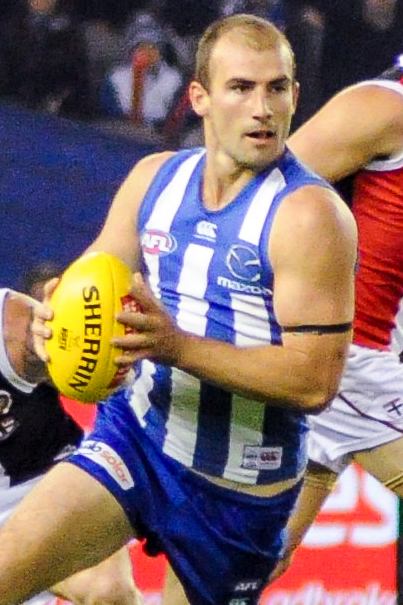
Ben Cunnington, 2017

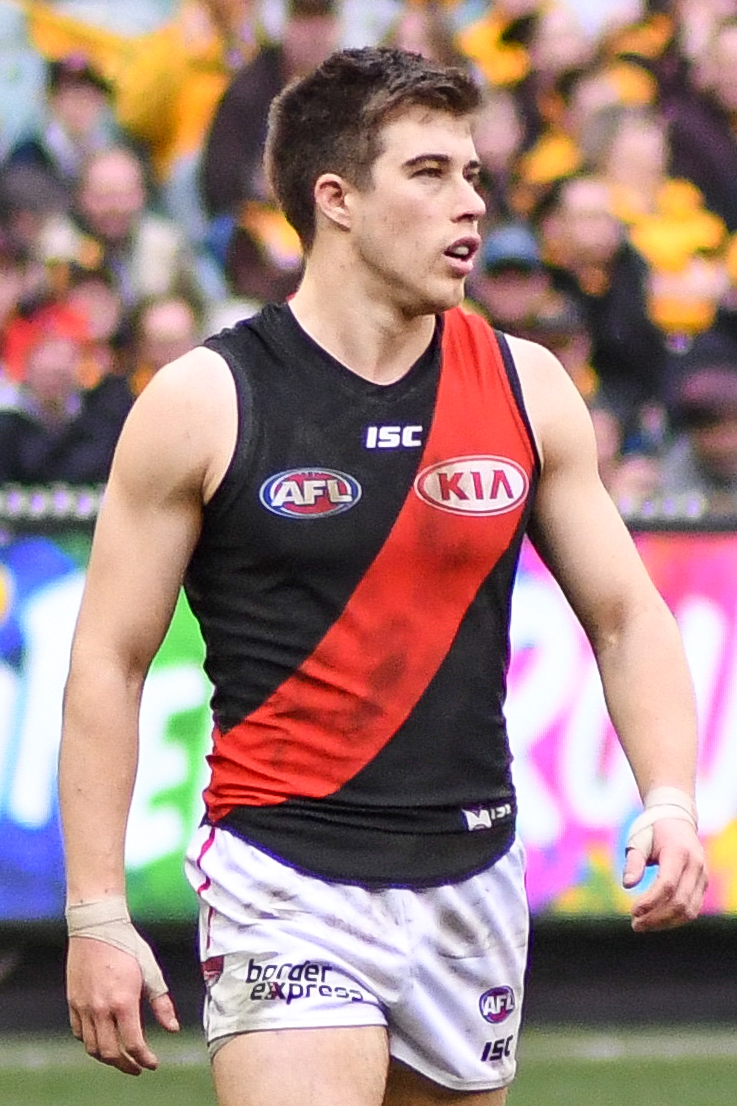
Zac Merrett, 2018

The following VFL/AFL players were recruited from Cobden and or drafted, with the year indicating their VFL / AFL senior football debut include -

- 1898 - Pat Scanlan (Melbourne)
- 1920 - Jim Mathieson (Geelong)
- 1924 - Arthur Rayson (Geelong)
- 1927 - Frank Keppel (Geelong)
- 1931 - Kevin Scanlan (Footscray)
- 1950 - Thorold Merrett (Collingwood)
- 1952 - Brian Coleman (Essendon)
- 1954 - Michael Giblett (St Kilda)
- 1954 - Bernie Moran (Carlton)
- 1956 - Ron Henriksen (Footscray)
- 1959 - Alistair Lord (Geelong)
- 1959 - Gavan Moran (Geelong)
- 1960 - Stewart Lord (Geelong)
- 1963 - John Rantall (South Melbourne)
- 1963 - Max Reed (St Kilda)
- 1968 - David Rhodes - (Fitzroy)
- 1976 - Tim Godfrey (Fitzroy)
- 1977 - Glen Ward (Fitzroy)
- 1981 - Robert Semmens (Richmond)
- 1992 - Anthony Darcy (Richmond)
- 2010 - Ben Cunnington (North Melbourne)
- 2010 - Joe Dare (Carlton)
- 2010 - Gary Rohan (Geelong)
- 2012 - Jackson Merrett (Essendon)
- 2014 - Zach Merrett (Essendon)
- 2017 - Sean Darcy (Fremantle)
- 2019 - Sam Walsh (Carlton)
- 2025 - Rhys Unwin (Essendon)

== Bibliography ==
- Evergreen Hampden: The Hampden Football League and its people, 1930-1976 by Fred Bond & Don Grossman, 1979 – ISBN 0868251089
- History of Football in the Western District by John Stoward – Aussie Footy Books, 2008 – ISBN 9780957751590
