= Tim Godfrey =

Tim Godfrey may refer to:

- Tim Godfrey (footballer), Australian rules footballer
- Tim Godfrey (musician), Nigerian gospel singer
