= Max Reed =

Max Reed may refer to:

- Max Reed (Australian footballer)
- Max Reed (American football)
