= Reg Hickey =

Australian rules footballer (1906–1973)

Personal information
- Full name: Reginald Joseph Hickey
- Born: 27 March 1906; Collingwood, Victoria
- Died: 13 December 1973 (aged 67); Geelong, Victoria
- Original team: Cressy
- Height: 185 cm (6 ft 1 in)
- Weight: 92 kg (203 lb)

Playing career^{1}
Years	Club	Games (Goals)
1926–1940	Geelong	245 (24)

Coaching career^{3}
Years	Club	Games (W–L–D)
1932–1959	Geelong	304 (183–118–3)
- ^{1} Playing statistics correct to the end of 1940.^{3} Coaching statistics correct as of 1959.

Career highlights
- Geelong premiership player 1931; Geelong premiership captain-coach 1937; Geelong premiership coach 1951, 1952; Geelong Team of the Century; Carji Greeves Medal 1928, 1934; Geelong captain 1932–1940

Reginald Joseph Hickey (27 March 1906 – 13 December 1973) was an Australian rules footballer who was a player, the captain, the captain-coach, and the non-playing coach for the Geelong Football Club in the Victorian Football League (VFL) between 1928 and 1940 (player), and between 1949 and 1959 (non-player).

In the 34 seasons from 1926 to 1959 he was involved in four Geelong VFL premierships: one as a player (1931), one as captain-coach (1937), and two as non-playing coach (1951, and 1952) – he was also the non-playing coach of a losing Grand Final team (1953), where an inaccurate Geelong (8.17 (65)) lost to Collingwood (11.11 (77)).

== Family ==
The son of Martin Hickey (1873–1944), and Margaret Teresa Hickey (1877–1965), née Meaney, Reginald Joseph Hickey was born in Collingwood on 27 March 1906.

He married Doreen Stella Markin (1916–1963) on 26 October 1938.

He was the nephew of Fitzroy (VFA & VFL) footballer Pat Hickey, and Fitzroy (VFA) footballer and Fitzroy (VFL) administrator Con Hickey. He is the grandfather of former Port Adelaide coach and captain Matthew Primus, and AFL Women's (AFLW) player Melissa Hickey is the granddaughter of his cousin.

He was in the same class as the inaugural Brownlow Medal winner, Edward "Carji" Greeves at the Struan Dam State School (3730), near to Cressy and Lismore in Western Victoria.

== Football ==
Hickey played 245 games for Geelong in a career spanning fifteen years, including two premierships, two club best-and-fairest awards, and nine seasons as club captain. Hickey also was a hard (but equally fair) coach, who helping build Geelong into a powerhouse during the early 1950s.

Hickey coached Geelong in 304 matches, including 91 matches as playing coach. As coach, he had a 60% winning record.

=== Playing career ===
Geelong recruited Hickey for the start of the 1926 season, with Hickey himself making a name as a tough defender, renowned for his dashing runs out of the defensive half.

He retired as a player in May 1940.

=== Captain-coach ===
Hickey was named captain-coach in 1932, but relinquished the coaching position to Arthur Coghlan the following season, although he remained captain of the team. In 1936, Hickey resumed his role as captain-coach, and continued, as such, until his retirement in 1940. By then he was the games record-holder for the club, and held that record until Bill Goggin took over in 1971.

Hickey's finest moment as captain-coach came in the 1937 Grand Final against Collingwood. Until the three quarter time break (when the scores were level), the contest had been relatively even between, with neither side being able to get ahead by more than a few points. In an effort to break the deadlock, and in a coaching move almost unheard of in those days, Hickey made wholesale positional changes:

- moving Les Hardiman from full-forward to centre half-back (Hardiman nullified the previously dominating Ron Todd);
- moving Jack Evans from the ruck to replace Hardiman at full-forward (Evans kicked 6 goals);
- moving Joe Sellwood from centre half-back to replace Gordon Abbott at centre half-forward; and
- moving Abbott from centre half-forward to replace Evans in the ruck.

His strategy worked, and Geelong comfortably won the match, kicking 6.6 (42) to Collingwood's 1.4 (10) in the last quarter.

=== Brownlow Medal ===
Hickey came third to Fitzroy's Haydn Bunton in the 1931 Brownlow Medal, and second to Fitzroy's Denis Ryan in the 1936 Brownlow Medal.

=== Coaching career ===
Due to travel restrictions and an exodus of players to war service in the Second World War, Geelong were unable to field a side for the 1942 and 1943 seasons.

Players transferred to other clubs; when Geelong rejoined the competition in 1944 season, but not all of those transferred returned to Geelong. The club finished close to or on the bottom of the ladder for the rest of the 1940s, claiming the wooden spoon in 1944 with a 1–17 record, and narrowly avoiding the 1945 wooden spoon on percentage.

Hickey was appointed coach for the third time in 1949, with immediate success. Though the club failed to make the finals, they showed marked improvement.

Hickey had a policy of fast, direct play, relentlessly drilling his players to ensure they made every possession count. In 1950, Geelong made the finals for the first time in ten years. For the next two and a half years, Geelong was the strongest side in the competition, winning two consecutive flags, and establishing a VFL/AFL record of 23 wins (unbeaten streak of 26) in a row during 1952 and 1953. It wasn't until the end of 1953 that Collingwood, with the use of ugly and restrictive football, were able to inflict defeat on Hickey's side. Geelong lost the Grand Final, and saw little success for the rest of Hickey's tenure — he retired from coaching at the end of the 1959 season.

== Death ==
He died at Geelong on 13 December 1973 and is buried in Geelong Western Cemetery, Minerva Rd, Herne Hill.

== Recognition ==
- Selected as the captain, coach, and centre half back of Geelong's official "Team of the Century".
- Selected on the interchange bench in the Victorian Team of the 20th Century.
- Inducted into the Australian Football Hall of Fame in 1996.
- The Eastern Stand at Skilled Stadium, Geelong's home ground, is named after him.
- The prestigious R.J. Hickey Award, is given annually by the Geelong club to an individual selected for his outstanding service to Australian rules football.
