= Frank Ford (footballer) =

Australian rules footballer (1907–1974)

Personal information
- Full name: Francis Noel Ford
- Born: 25 December 1907; Tallygaroopna, Victoria
- Died: 18 March 1974 (aged 66); Inglewood, Victoria
- Original team: Sandhurst
- Height: 171 cm (5 ft 7 in)
- Weight: 71 kg (157 lb)

Playing career^{1}
| Years | Club | Games (Goals) |
| 1931 | Richmond | 16 (11) |
| 1932–1933 | Essendon | 21 (26) |
| Total | | 37 (37) |
- ^{1} Playing statistics correct to the end of 1933.

Francis Noel Ford (25 December 1907 – 18 March 1974) was an Australian rules footballer who played with Richmond and Essendon in the Victorian Football League (VFL).

== Family ==
The son of Thomas Henry Ford (1880-1950), and Elizabeth Ellen Ford (1878-1956), née Thomas, Francis Noel Ford was born at Tallygaroopna, Victoria on 25 December 1907.

His older brother, William Thomas "Bill" Ford (1906–1984), played for Richmond and Hawthorn in the VFL, and for Camberwell in the VFA.

== Football ==
Ford, a rover and forward, was the leading goal-kicker in the 1929 Bendigo Football League season with 62 goals. The Sandhurst player made 16 appearances for Richmond in 1931. The last of those was their 1931 VFL Grand Final loss, which he started from a forward pocket.

He joined Essendon in 1932 and was their third leading goal-kicker in his debut season in 22 goals. After one more season he returned to Bendigo and resumed at Sandhurst.
