= Allan Everett =

Allan Everett may refer to:

- Allan Everett (footballer), Australian rules footballer
- Allan Everett (Royal Navy officer) (1868–1938), British Royal Navy officer

== See also ==
- Allen Everitt, English architectural artist and illustrator
