= Gordon Mackie =

Gordon Mackie may refer to:

- Gordon Mackie (politician) (1912–1990), Australian politician
- Gordon Mackie (footballer) (1909–1983), Australian rules footballer
- C. Gordon Mackie, Scottish businessman in Hong Kong
