= Charlie Clymo =

Personal information
- Full name: William Charles Clymo
- Born: 30 October 1884; Bendigo, Victoria
- Died: 8 October 1955 (aged 70); Ballarat, Victoria
- Original team: Eaglehawk (BFL)

Playing career^{1}
Years	Club	Games (Goals)
1907–1909	St Kilda	43 (21)

Coaching career^{3}
Years	Club	Games (W–L–D)
1931	Geelong	21 (17–4–0)
- ^{1} Playing statistics correct to the end of 1909.^{3} Coaching statistics correct as of 1931.

Career highlights
- Geelong premiership coach 1931

William Charles ("Charlie") Clymo (30 October 1884 – 8 October 1955) was the captain of the Ballarat Fire Brigade for almost forty years, and was also an excellent sportsman, being an Australian rules footballer who played for St Kilda. He later coached Geelong to a premiership in the Victorian Football League (VFL).

== Early life ==
Clymo was born in Bendigo and was brought up by an aunt and uncle, Bertha and Nicholas Clymo. He lived in Eaglehawk, and spent his early working life as a miner and volunteer fireman, travelling to and from Melbourne each Saturday to play with St Kilda.

== Career ==
Clymo played football on Wednesdays for Eaglehawk and on Saturdays for St Kilda. He made his St Kilda debut in 1907 and, in that season, was a member of the first St Kilda side to compete in the finals.

After three years playing in the VFL, Clymo was appointed captain of the Ballarat Fire Brigade. Re-locating to Ballarat, he became captain-coach of the local Golden Point club in the Ballarat Football League, and led the club to premierships in 1910, 1914 and 1919.

He also coached the Ballarat Football Club from 1920, including a premiership in 1923. In 1924, he was successful in taking Moolort to its only flag in the Maryborough competition. He later took up umpiring.

In 1929, Clymo took charge of the Ballarat Imperial Football Club, which won the premiership that year and was runner-up in 1930.

In 1931, he was appointed coach of Geelong and helped them to a VFL premiership. To fulfil his appointment, Clymo got six months leave of absence from his employer, the Ballarat brickmakers, Selkirks. Geelong defeated Richmond in the Grand Final by 20 points.

In 1932, Clymo was back coaching Golden Point. It was the depths of the Great Depression, and he coached without compensation because the club had little money.

He served as captain of the Ballarat Fire Brigade from 1910 until his retirement in 1949. He was a keen participant in Fire Brigade competitions, winning over 150 trophies between 1907 and 1925.

Clymo died in 1955, leaving a widow and a son.
