= Stan Ryan =

Australian rules footballer (1902–1983)

Personal information
- Full name: Stanislaus Ryan
- Born: 5 December 1902; Lilydale, Tasmania
- Died: 1 December 1983 (aged 80); Moonah, Tasmania
- Original team: North Hobart
- Height: 183 cm (6 ft 0 in)
- Weight: 83 kg (183 lb)

Playing career^{1}
Years	Club	Games (Goals)
1929	Richmond	14 (8)
- ^{1} Playing statistics correct to the end of 1929.

Stan Ryan (5 December 1902 – 1 December 1983) was an Australian rules footballer who played with Richmond in the Victorian Football League (VFL).

== Football ==
Ryan was a Tasmanian and won the best and fairest award at North Hobart in 1928. The following year he played for Richmond, making 14 appearances, including the 1929 VFL Grand Final. He played his football as a follower.

== Military service ==
Ryan later served in the Australian Army for two years during World War II.
