= David Rhodes (footballer) =

Australian rules footballer

Personal information
- Full name: David Charles Rhodes
- Born: 20 May 1948
- Died: 15 February 2013 (aged 64)
- Original team: Cobden
- Height: 184 cm (6 ft 0 in)
- Weight: 80 kg (176 lb)

Playing career^{1}
Years	Club	Games (Goals)
1968–1973	Fitzroy	72 (14)
- ^{1} Playing statistics correct to the end of 1973.

David Charles Rhodes (20 May 1948 – 15 February 2013) was an Australian rules footballer who played with Fitzroy in the Victorian Football League (VFL).

Rhodes, a blonde headed winger, spent six seasons with Fitzroy before transferring to Western Australia, to play for Subiaco. He was selected to represent Victoria at the 1972 Perth Carnival.
