= Jim Wills =

Australian rules footballer, born 1914

Personal information
- Full name: James George Wills
- Born: 21 October 1914; Geelong, Victoria
- Died: 14 May 2007 (aged 92)
- Original team: Geelong West
- Height: 170 cm (5 ft 7 in)
- Weight: 75 kg (165 lb)

Playing career^{1}
Years	Club	Games (Goals)
1937–1940	Geelong	26 (16)
- ^{1} Playing statistics correct to the end of 1940.

James George Wills (21 October 1914 – 14 May 2007) was an Australian rules footballer who played with Geelong in the Victorian Football League (VFL).

Recruited from Geelong West, Wills played 16 senior games in 1937, his debut season. He was a half forward flanker in the 1937 VFL Grand Final and had 18 kicks in a winning team. He managed just 10 further appearances over the next three years, not featuring at all in the 1939 VFL season. In 1941 he enlisted with the Royal Australian Armoured Corps and served overseas during World War II.
