= Ralph Lancaster =

Australian rules footballer

Personal information
- Full name: Ralph Charles Lancaster
- Born: 25 November 1907; Numurkah, Victoria
- Died: 28 August 1942 (aged 34); Port Moresby, New Guinea
- Original team: Geelong College
- Height: 170 cm (5 ft 7 in)
- Weight: 66 kg (146 lb)
- Position: Rover

Playing career^{1}
Years	Club	Games (Goals)
1929–1932, 1935	Geelong	44 (34)
- ^{1} Playing statistics correct to the end of 1935.

Ralph Charles Lancaster (25 November 1907 – 28 August 1942) was an Australian rules footballer who played for Geelong in the Victorian Football League (VFL).

== Family ==
The son of Thomas Stanley Lancaster (1878-1960), the Town Clerk of Newtown and Chilwell, and Maud Amelia Lancaster (1878-1938), née Cory, Ralph Charles Lancaster was born in Numurkah on 25 November 1907.

He married Jean Loveniah McCurdy (1912-1968), later Mrs Arnold Start Henderson, in 1938.

== Football ==
Lancaster was recruited locally, from Geelong College.

A rover, he kicked 20 goals in his debut season, and the following year was 19th. man in Geelong's 1930 VFL Grand Final loss to Collingwood.

== Military service ==
During World War II, Lancaster served in New Guinea as a Gunner with the 9th Light Anti-Aircraft Battery, of the Royal Australian Artillery.

== Death ==
He died of wounds sustained whilst on active service in New Guinea on 28 August 1942.

He is buried at the Port Moresby (Bomana) War Cemetery.

== See also ==
- List of Victorian Football League players who died on active service
