= Charlie Street =

Australian rules footballer, born 1909

Personal information
- Full name: Charles Street
- Born: 8 November 1909
- Died: 24 June 1982 (aged 72)
- Original teams: St James, North Richmond
- Height: 185 cm (6 ft 1 in)
- Weight: 82 kg (181 lb)

Playing career^{1}
Years	Club	Games (Goals)
1928–1931	Richmond	13 (2)
1932–1933	Carlton	33 (1)
Total		46 (3)
- ^{1} Playing statistics correct to the end of 1933.

Charles Street (8 November 1909 – 24 June 1982) was an Australian rules footballer who played with Richmond and Carlton in the Victorian Football League (VFL).

Street played at Richmond for three seasons, without ever becoming a regular fixture in the team. He then crossed to Carlton and was in a back pocket in their 1932 VFL Grand Final loss to Richmond.
