= Harry Marsham =

Australian rules footballer

Personal information
- Full name: Henry Marsham (born Kendall)
- Nickname: Nipper
- Born: 19 July 1890; Carlton, Victoria
- Died: 31 December 1932 (aged 42); Geelong, Victoria
- Original team: Chilwell (GDFA)
- Height: 185 cm (6 ft 1 in)
- Weight: 90 kg (198 lb)
- Position: Ruckman/Forward

Playing career^{1}
Years	Club	Games (Goals)
1908	Chilwell (GDFA)	
1909–1915	Geelong (VFL)	93 (51)
1916	Richmond (VFL)	7 (4)
1917–1919	Geelong (VFL)	35 (12)
Total		135 (67)
- ^{1} Playing statistics correct to the end of 1919.

Career highlights
- Geelong Captain 1917; Three times state representative

Harry "Nipper" Marsham (19 July 1890 – 31 December 1932) was a player for the Geelong Football Club and the Richmond Football Club in the VFL between 1909 and 1919.

== Family ==
The son of Rebecca Josephine Kendall (1869–1936), Henry Kendall, later known as Henry Marsham, was born at Carlton, Victoria on 19 July 1890.

He married Olive Gertrude Elizabeth McQueen (1893–1950) (later Mrs. Albert Payor Rapkins) in 1915. Their son, Alan Robert Marsham (1920–1990), also played with Geelong in the VFL.

== Football ==
"Harry was a well-built ruckman and key-position player. He was a strong mark and although not blessed with pace he had the stamina to ruck all day."

=== Geelong (VFL) ===
Recruited from the Chilwell Football Club in the Geelong District Football Association (GDFA), he played as a ruckman and forward for Geelong for seven seasons.

=== Richmond (VFL) ===
When Geelong were unable to compete in 1916 due to World War I, he crossed to Richmond, and played in 7 matches (including the Semi-Final against Carlton, at the MCG, on 19 August 1916), and scored 4 goals.

=== Geelong (VFL) ===
Marsham returned to Geelong for the 1917 season and captained the club that year. He retired at the end of the 1919 season.

== Death ==
He died at his South Geelong residence on 31 December 1932.

== See also ==
- 1914 Sydney Carnival
