= Tom Dunne (footballer) =

Australian rules footballer

Personal information
- Full name: Thomas James Dunne
- Born: 12 November 1906; Charlton, Victoria
- Died: 15 February 1983 (aged 76); Bundoora, Victoria
- Original team: Kerang
- Height: 183 cm (6 ft 0 in)
- Weight: 78 kg (172 lb)

Playing career^{1}
Years	Club	Games (Goals)
1929–1931	Richmond	21 (1)
1932–1933	North Melbourne	8 (0)
Total		29 (1)
- ^{1} Playing statistics correct to the end of 1933.

Thomas Dunne (12 November 1906 – 15 February 1983) was an Australian rules footballer who played with Richmond and North Melbourne in the Victorian Football League (VFL).

Originally from Kerang, Dunne was a defender during his league career. He was on a half back flank in the 1929 VFL Grand Final, which Richmond lost to Collingwood. Despite not playing a game in the 1931 home and away season, he came into the side for the semi-final, replacing Maurie Sheahan at centre half-back. He remained in that position for the 1931 VFL Grand Final but again finished on the losing team.
