= Ted Llewellyn =

Australian rules footballer (1909–2002)

Personal information
- Full name: Edward Llewellyn
- Born: 3 February 1909
- Died: 20 January 2002 (aged 92)
- Original team: Port Fairy
- Height: 189 cm (6 ft 2 in)
- Weight: 89 kg (196 lb)

Playing career^{1}
Years	Club	Games (Goals)
1929–1931	Geelong	38 (23)
1932–1935	North Melbourne	50 (31)
Total		88 (54)
- ^{1} Playing statistics correct to the end of 1935.

Edward Llewellyn (3 February 1909 – 20 January 2002) was an Australian rules footballer who played with Geelong and North Melbourne in the Victorian Football League (VFL).

Llewellyn was a follower, also used at centre half-forward when not in the ruck. Originally from Port Fairy, he started at Geelong in 1929 but had his breakthrough season in 1930 when he played 19 of a possible 21 games. This included the 1930 VFL Grand Final against Collingwood, where he contributed two goals in a 30-point loss. He almost played in another grand final for Geelong the following year but was omitted from the team, despite participating in their preliminary final win. Geelong would become the 1931 premiers and a disappointed Llewellyn requested a clearance.

He spent four seasons at North Melbourne and was appointed club captain when Tom Fitzmaurice retired midway through the 1935 VFL season. Llewellyn wasn't captain for many round as, not only was it his final year with the struggling club, but he missed six games through suspension for striking Essendon's George Bell. He came back from his suspension in round 18 for one final match, bringing his North Melbourne games tally to 50, the last 24 of which were losses. In 1936 he joined Bendigo Football League club Maryborough as a playing coach.

Llewellyn transferred to Benalla with his work in 1951 and was captain coach of All Blacks Football Club's 1953 premiership in the Benalla & District Football League premiership.
