= Bob Troughton =

Australian rules footballer (1904–88)

Personal information
- Born: 17 June 1904
- Died: 17 August 1988 (aged 84)
- Original team: North Broken Hill (BHFL)
- Height: 175 cm (5 ft 9 in)
- Weight: 71 kg (157 lb)

Playing career^{1}
Years	Club	Games (Goals)
1926–1929	West Torrens	51 (143)
1930–1935	Geelong	92 (100)
- ^{1} Playing statistics correct to the end of 1935.

Robert Troughton (17 June 1904 – 17 August 1988) was an Australian rules footballer who played with Geelong in the Victorian Football League (VFL) during the early 1930s.

Troughton played as both a wingman and rover, also at times used up forward. He started his career at Broken Hill Football League club North Broken Hill before moving to Adelaide to play for South Australian National Football League (SANFL) club West Torrens, topping their goalkicking in 1928 and 1929. Geelong recruited him for the 1930 VFL season and he played in their losing Grand Final that year and their premiership the following season.
