= Milton Lamb =

Australian rules footballer (1909–2006)

Personal information
- Full name: William Milton Lamb
- Born: 14 July 1909; Foster, Victoria
- Died: 21 June 2006 (aged 96); Kew, Victoria
- Original team: Geelong College
- Height: 173 cm (5 ft 8 in)
- Weight: 70 kg (154 lb)

Playing career^{1}
Years	Club	Games (Goals)
1928–1932	Geelong	72 (1)
- ^{1} Playing statistics correct to the end of 1932.

William Milton Lamb (14 July 1909 – 21 June 2006) was an Australian rules footballer who played with Geelong in the Victorian Football League (VFL).

== Overview ==
Lamb, recruited locally from Geelong College, was a back pocket defender. He played all 21 games for Geelong in 1930, including their grand final loss. The following season he missed just one game all year and again featured in the grand final, this time finishing in the winning team. He had been one of Geelong's best players in the 1931 Grand Final, with 13 kicks and a good defensive job of the Richmond rovers.

== Death ==
He lived until the age of 96 (died 21 June 2006) and was the last surviving player from the 1931 Geelong premiership winning side.
