= Carl Watson =

Australian rules footballer (1904–1960)

Personal information
- Full name: Ernest Carl Watson
- Born: 11 November 1904; Deloraine, Tasmania
- Died: 26 February 1960 (aged 55); South Melbourne, Victoria
- Original team: Latrobe
- Height: 175 cm (5 ft 9 in)
- Weight: 76 kg (168 lb)

Playing career^{1}
Years	Club	Games (Goals)
1927–1931	Richmond	44 (3)
1932	Essendon	11 (1)
Total		55 (4)
- ^{1} Playing statistics correct to the end of 1932.

Ernest Carl Watson (11 November 1904 – 26 February 1960) was an Australian rules footballer who played with Richmond and Essendon in the Victorian Football League (VFL).

== Family ==
The son of Frank Watson (1878-1957), and Emily May Watson (1878-1941), née Elmer, Ernest Carl Watson was born at Deloraine, Tasmania on 11 November 1904.

He married Julia Phyllis Gladys Hanson (1908-1972) in 1935.

== Football ==
Watson came to Richmond from Tasmanian club Latrobe.

=== Richmond (VFL) ===
He played on a wing for Richmond in the 1928 VFL Grand Final and 1929 VFL Grand Final. Richmond were beaten in both matches.

=== Essendon (VFL) ===
He moved to Essendon for the 1932 VFL season.

=== Oakleigh (VFA) ===
Cleared from Essendon in 1931, he played with the VFA club Oakleigh for nine seasons.

== Athlete ==
He was a well-performed professional sprinter, winning, among other victories, the 1924 (130 yards) Ulverstone Cup, running off 12 yards (Ted Terry, running off 11 yards was third).

== Employment ==
Outside of football, he was employed as a fireman.
