= Charlie Ahern =

Australian rules footballer

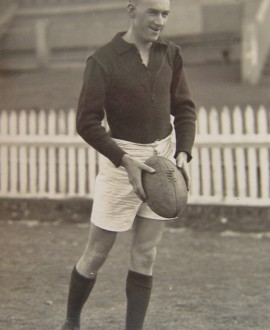
- Ahern in 1929

Personal information
- Full name: Charles David Ahern
- Born: 25 June 1905; Northcote, Victoria
- Died: 7 April 1931 (aged 25); Heidelberg, Victoria
- Original team: Williamstown C.Y.M.S. (CYMSFA)
- Height: 180 cm (5 ft 11 in)
- Weight: 79 kg (174 lb)
- Position: Rover

Playing career^{1}
| Years | Club | Games (Goals) |
| 1929 | Collingwood | 3 (0) |
- ^{1} Playing statistics correct to the end of 1929.

Career highlights
- VFL premiership player: 1929

Charles David Ahern (25 June 1905 – 7 April 1931) was an Australian rules footballer who played for Collingwood in the Victorian Football League (VFL).

After playing junior football for Williamstown C.Y.M.S., Ahern's senior career began in the Victorian Football Association with Northcote, where he played, mostly as a half-back, between 1925 and 1928. After trialling unsuccessfully with Fitzroy in 1927 preseason training, Ahern joined Collingwood in 1928.

Ahern played most of his two seasons with Collingwood in the seconds, and by the end of 1929 had played only two senior games, in rounds 9 and 12 that season. He was thus a surprise inclusion in Collingwood's side for the 1929 grand final against Richmond, brought in to provide weight and strength in the ruck which Collingwood had lacked in its semi-final loss against the same team. Collingwood won and Ahern became the least experienced premiership player in the history of the club.

The grand final was Ahern's last senior match, as he fell seriously ill in the months following the match. He died 18 months later on 7 April 1931.
