= Fred Froude =

Australian rules footballer, born 1910

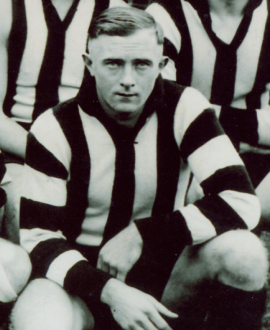
- Froude during his Collingwood career

Personal information
- Full name: Frederick Ernest Froude
- Born: 3 July 1910; Mount Lyell, Tasmania
- Died: 16 June 1978 (aged 67); Kew, Victoria
- Height: 174 cm (5 ft 9 in)
- Weight: 82 kg (181 lb)

Playing career^{1}
Years	Club	Games (Goals)
1930–1939	Collingwood	148 (41)

Coaching career^{3}
Years	Club	Games (W–L–D)
1948–1950	St Kilda	56 (14–41–1)
- ^{1} Playing statistics correct to the end of 1939.^{3} Coaching statistics correct as of 1950.

Frederick Ernest Froude (3 July 1910 – 16 June 1978) was an Australian rules footballer who played with Collingwood and coached St Kilda in the Victorian Football League (VFL).

Although Froude played most of his career as a half back flanker, he started as a forward and kicked 30 goals in the 1931 VFL season. He played in five grand finals for three premierships; 1930, 1935 and 1936. In 1948, nine years after retiring, Froude returned to the VFL as coach of St Kilda. Before the war he had been coach of Brighton.
