= Kevin Scanlan =

Australian rules footballer, born 1909

Personal information
- Full name: Kevin Michael Scanlan
- Born: 29 September 1909; Cobden, Victoria
- Died: 19 July 1996 (aged 86)
- Original team: Cobden
- Height: 180 cm (5 ft 11 in)
- Weight: 74 kg (163 lb)

Playing career^{1}
Years	Club	Games (Goals)
1931	Footscray	1 (0)
- ^{1} Playing statistics correct to the end of 1931.

Kevin Michael Scanlan (29 September 1909 – 19 July 1996) was an Australian rules footballer who played with Footscray in the Victorian Football League (VFL).
