= Fred Gilby =

Australian rules footballer, born 1907

Personal information
- Full name: Frederick William Gilby
- Born: 6 November 1907
- Died: 6 November 1991 (aged 84)
- Original team: Coburg
- Height: 175 cm (5 ft 9 in)
- Weight: 80 kg (176 lb)
- Position: Defender

Playing career^{1}
Years	Club	Games (Goals)
1925	Coburg (VFA)	2 (0)
1926–37	Carlton	179 (4)
- ^{1} Playing statistics correct to the end of 1937.

Frederick William Gilby (6 November 1907 – 6 November 1991) was an Australian rules footballer who played for Carlton in the Victorian Football League (VFL).

Gilby, a half back flanker, played at Coburg in 1925 when they were in their first VFA season. He joined Carlton the following year and was a regular in the team for over a decade. Gilby played 12 finals during his career and appeared in the 1932 VFL Grand Final, which Carlton lost to Richmond.
