= Robert Semmens =

Australian rules footballer

Personal information
- Born: 5 December 1961 (age 64)
- Original team: East Launceston
- Height: 173 cm (5 ft 8 in)
- Weight: 79 kg (174 lb)

Playing career^{1}
Years	Club	Games (Goals)
1981	Richmond	5 (0)
1983–1984	Footscray	7 (3)
Total		12 (3)
- ^{1} Playing statistics correct to the end of 1984.

Robert Semmens (born 5 December 1961) is a former Australian rules footballer who played with Richmond and Footscray in the Victorian Football League (VFL).

Semmens, at the age of 15, represented the Tasmanians Schoolboys at the 1977 Jubilee National Football Carnival. The team went undefeated and in 2013 was inducted into the Tasmanian Football Hall of Fame as a "legendary" team.

In the early 1980s, Semmens played in the VFL, making five appearances for Richmond and seven for Footscray. In between his stints at those two clubs he played for Norwood in the South Australian National Football League.

Semmens then played with Williamstown in the Victorian Football Association.

He competed in the Hampden Football Netball League in 1990, for Cobden, where he still lives.
