= Jack Anderson (footballer, born 1908) =

Australian rules footballer (1908–1958)

Personal information
- Full name: John Yates Anderson
- Born: 29 October 1908; Beechworth, Victoria
- Died: 25 May 1958 (aged 49); Melbourne, Victoria
- Original team: Traralgon
- Height: 180 cm (5 ft 11 in)
- Weight: 82.5 kg (182 lb)

Playing career^{1}
Years	Club	Games (Goals)
1932–1933	Richmond	9 (2)
1935–1939	North Melbourne	59 (10)
Total		68 (12)
- ^{1} Playing statistics correct to the end of 1939.

Career highlights
- VFL premiership player: 1932

John Yates Anderson (29 October 1908 – 25 May 1958) was an Australian rules footballer who played in the Victorian Football League (VFL) between 1932 and 1933 for the Richmond Football Club and from 1935 to 1939 for the North Melbourne Football Club. Jack Anderson is the father of former radio announcer John Anderson.

A fireman by profession, Anderson collapsed and died while supervising salvage operations at the scene of a fire on the corner of Hardware Lane and Lonsdale Street in the Melbourne Central Business District on 25 May 1958.
