= Horrie Bullen =

Australian rules footballer, born 1906

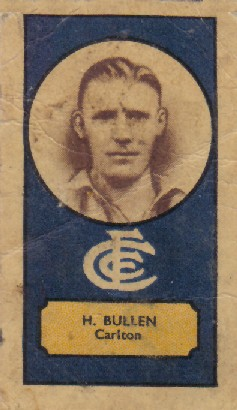
- Cigarette card of Bullen

Personal information
- Full name: Horace Edwin Bullen
- Born: 13 March 1906; Doncaster, Victoria
- Died: 7 November 1961 (aged 55); Richmond, Victoria
- Original team: Doncaster
- Height: 185 cm (6 ft 1 in)
- Weight: 91 kg (201 lb)
- Position: Ruckman

Playing career^{1}
Years	Club	Games (Goals)
1926	Hawthorn	2 (0)
1932–1937	Carlton	59 (38)
Total		61 (38)
- ^{1} Playing statistics correct to the end of 1937.

Horace Edwin Bullen (13 March 1906 – 7 November 1961) was an Australian rules footballer who played with Hawthorn and Carlton in the Victorian Football League (VFL).

Bullen, a ruckman and key defender, came to Hawthorn from Doncaster, to make two appearances in the 1926 VFL season. He continued playing at Doncaster until 1932, when he joined Carlton. In the 1932 VFL Grand Final, which Carlton lost, Bullen kicked two goals.
