= Clive Coles =

Australian rules footballer (1911–1984)

Personal information
- Full name: Clive Leslie Coles
- Born: 12 March 1911
- Died: 9 April 1984 (aged 73)
- Height: 177 cm (5 ft 10 in)
- Weight: 82 kg (181 lb)

Playing career^{1}
Years	Club	Games (Goals)
1930–1938	Geelong	109 (76)
1939	St Kilda	13 (21)
Total		122 (97)
- ^{1} Playing statistics correct to the end of 1939.

Clive Leslie "Pixie" Coles (12 March 1911 – 9 April 1984) was an Australian rules footballer who played with Geelong and St Kilda in the Victorian Football League (VFL).

Coles gave Geelong good service during the 1930s, after arriving at the club as a local recruit. From 1930 to 1936 he was most often seen in the back pockets, but could also play as a rover. He was moved into the forward in 1937 and kicked 24 goals for the year, including four goals in the Grand Final win over Collingwood. The following year he had his most prolific season up forward, with 36 goals, the third most by a Geelong player. He was cleared to St Kilda in 1939 and kicked six goals in just his second game for his new club, against Fitzroy. It was his final VFL season and he signed with Port Melbourne in 1940.
