= Gavan Moran =

Australian rules footballer

Personal information
- Full name: Gavan Desmond Moran
- Born: 4 March 1936; Cobden, Victoria
- Died: 1 April 1983 (aged 47); South Melbourne, Victoria
- Original team: Cobden
- Height: 191 cm (6 ft 3 in)
- Weight: 87 kg (192 lb)

Playing career^{1}
Years	Club	Games (Goals)
1959	Geelong	1 (0)
- ^{1} Playing statistics correct to the end of 1959.

Gavan Desmond Moran (4 March 1936 – 1 April 1983) was an Australian rules footballer who played with Geelong in the Victorian Football League (VFL).

His older brother Bernie Moran played for Carlton a few years earlier.
