= Frank Keppel =

Australian rules footballer

Personal information
- Full name: Francis Sylvester Keppel
- Born: 8 December 1899; Marysville, Victoria
- Died: 4 February 1975 (aged 75); Ashwood, Victoria
- Original team: Cobden
- Height: 182 cm (6 ft 0 in)
- Weight: 73 kg (161 lb)

Playing career^{1}
Years	Club	Games (Goals)
1927–1930	Geelong	40 (3)
- ^{1} Playing statistics correct to the end of 1930.

Francis Sylvester Keppel (8 December 1899 – 4 February 1975) was an Australian rules footballer who played with Geelong in the Victorian Football League (VFL).

Keppel spent much of the 1920s playing with the Thornton Football Club, but was with Cobden when he was invited by the Geelong committee to train with the VFL club.

Already 27 years of age, Keppel had a brief stint in the Geelong seconds before appearing with the seniors for the final eight games of the 1927 season.

He played 12 matches in each of the next two seasons and was a wingman in the Geelong team which lost the 1930 VFL Grand Final, his last game.
