= Leo Opray =

Australian rules footballer

Personal information
- Full name: Leo Charles Opray
- Born: 13 August 1909; Richmond, Victoria
- Died: 8 February 1974 (aged 64); Heidelberg West, Victoria
- Original team: Oakleigh
- Height: 168 cm (5 ft 6 in)
- Weight: 66 kg (146 lb)

Playing career^{1}
Years	Club	Games (Goals)
1930–1931	Oakleigh (VFA)	31 (11)
1932–1933	Carlton	31 (2)
1935	Coburg (VFA)	3 (2)
1938–39	Brighton (VFA)	13 (22)
- ^{1} Playing statistics correct to the end of 1939.

Leo Charles Opray (13 August 1909 – 8 February 1974) was an Australian rules footballer who played with Carlton in the Victorian Football League (VFL).

Opray played in the seconds for Richmond in 1929 and from there went to Oakleigh, where he was a member of their 1930 and 1931 premierships sides.

He joined Carlton in 1932 and was a wingman in their grand final team that year, which lost to his former club, Richmond. He subsequently played with Coburg, Murtoa and Brighton.

Opray later served in the Australian Army during World War II.
