= John Rantall =

Australian rules footballer, born 1943

Personal information
- Full name: John Rantall
- Born: 9 December 1943 (age 82)
- Original team: Cobden
- Height: 182 cm (6 ft 0 in)
- Weight: 77 kg (170 lb)
- Position: Defender/ruck-rover

Playing career^{1}
Years	Club	Games (Goals)
1963–72, 1976–79	South Melbourne	260 (8)
1973–1975	North Melbourne	70 (2)
1980	Fitzroy	6 (0)
Total		336 (10)

Representative team honours
Years	Team	Games (Goals)
1971	Victoria	5 (0)
- ^{1} Playing statistics correct to the end of 1980.

Career highlights
- VFL Premiership player: (1975); Syd Barker Medal: (1974); South Melbourne captain: (1972); Swans Team of the Century; North Melbourne Team of the Century

John "Mopsy" Rantall (born 9 December 1943) is a former Australian rules footballer who played for the South Melbourne Football Club, North Melbourne Football Club and Fitzroy Football Club in the Victorian Football League (VFL).

A lightly built defender who consistently held his own against many of the VFL's best forwards, Rantall was an inaugural inductee into the Australian Football Hall of Fame in 1996. He is a member of both the North Melbourne and Swans Team of the Century.

== Playing career ==
Originally from Cobden, Rantall moved to the South Melbourne Football Club, where he debuted in 1963. John had four children—two boys and two girls—which all played stateside Australian rules football and netball. He quickly became recognised as one of the VFL's most dependable and consistent defenders, and when South Melbourne's champion rover and captain Bob Skilton tore an achilles tendon before the 1969 VFL season, Rantall stood in as acting captain, eventually taking over as official captain after Skilton retired in 1971. In 1973, he moved to North Melbourne Football Club under the VFL's short-lived "10-year rule", which allowed players with ten years of service at one club to move to another club without a clearance, with the intention of playing in a premiership side. He got his wish, winning in 1975. He then moved back to South Melbourne for 1976. A reliable defender who worked tirelessly to repel opposition attacks, Rantall had magnificent skills.

Sadly, Rantall's career at South Melbourne came to a bitter end despite being the club's games record holder.

He moved to Fitzroy for one last season in 1980, where he played six games and broke Kevin Murray's VFL games record.

== Life after Playing ==
After the South Melbourne Football Club relocated to Sydney, Rantall became a respected football pioneer in Queensland and New South Wales, which included a coaching stint in Brisbane, time on the board of AFL North Coast (NSW), and a junior coaching role with the Swans Academy in that region.

In 1996, he was inducted into the Australian Football Hall of Fame.

In January 2014, Rantall moved back to country Victoria, wanting to be close to his two brothers. He settled in Noorat, about 30 kilometres from his hometown, Cobden.
