= Michael Giblett =

Australian rules footballer

Personal information
- Full name: Michael Giblett
- Born: 16 April 1934
- Died: 31 January 1999 (aged 64)
- Original team: Cobden
- Height: 185 cm (6 ft 1 in)
- Weight: 86 kg (190 lb)
- Position: Ruck

Playing career^{1}
Years	Club	Games (Goals)
1954–56	St Kilda	17 (0)
- ^{1} Playing statistics correct to the end of 1956.

Michael Giblett (16 April 1934 – 31 January 1999) was an Australian rules footballer who played with St Kilda in the Victorian Football League (VFL).
