= Jack Walker (Australian footballer, born 1910) =

Australian rules footballer, born 1910

Personal information
- Full name: John James Walker
- Born: 28 August 1910; Burnley
- Died: 9 April 1982 (aged 71)
- Original team: Lara
- Height: 180 cm (5 ft 11 in)
- Weight: 82 kg (181 lb)

Playing career^{1}
Years	Club	Games (Goals)
1930–1935	Geelong	76 (3)
- ^{1} Playing statistics correct to the end of 1935.

Jack Walker (28 August 1910 – 9 April 1982) was an Australian rules footballer who played with Geelong in the Victorian Football League (VFL).

From Lara, Walker was a centreman and wingman but could also play as a defender. He was a wingman in Geelong's 1931 premiership team and played all 18 games in 1932. He again played finals football in 1933 and 1934, appearing in two more preliminary finals. He was also a VFL interstate football representative.
