= Bill Aldag =

Australian rules footballer

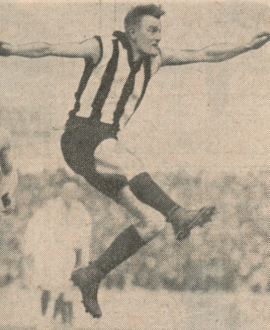
- Aldag during his Collingwood career

Personal information
- Full name: William Jacob Aldag
- Born: 30 November 1905; Fitzroy North, Victoria
- Died: 10 November 1974 (aged 68); Heidelberg, Victoria
- Height: 183 cm (6 ft 0 in)
- Weight: 85 kg (187 lb)

Playing career^{1}
Years	Club	Games (Goals)
1928	Footscray	2 (0)
1930–1931	Collingwood	9 (0)
Total		11 (0)
- ^{1} Playing statistics correct to the end of 1931.

Career highlights
- VFL premiership player: 1930

William Jacob Aldag (30 November 1905 – 10 November 1974) was an Australian rules footballer who played for Footscray and Collingwood in the Victorian Football League (VFL).

Aldag had his first league season in 1928 with Footscray. In 1930, he joined Collingwood and was a half-forward flanker in their record-setting 1930 premiership team.

Aldag enlisted in the 2nd AIF in 1940 and served in the Middle East in 1941 before being posted to Java, where he was declared missing in 1942. Aldag was later found in a POW camp in Thailand, where he worked on the infamous Burma Railway in appalling conditions. He returned home in November 1945.
