= Laurie Slack =

Australian rules footballer, born 1915

Personal information
- Full name: Laurence Gordon Slack
- Born: 17 March 1915; Bacchus Marsh, Victoria
- Died: 5 February 1991 (aged 75)
- Original team: East Geelong
- Height: 178 cm (5 ft 10 in)
- Weight: 70 kg (154 lb)
- Position: Wing

Playing career^{1}
Years	Club	Games (Goals)
1935–1940	Geelong	77 (11)
- ^{1} Playing statistics correct to the end of 1940.

Laurence Gordon Slack (17 March 1915 – 5 February 1991) was an Australian rules footballer who played with Geelong in the Victorian Football League (VFL).

Slack was a wingman, from East Geelong, who spent six seasons in the VFL. He was a member of Geelong's 1937 premiership team and had 15 kicks and seven marks in the grand final. Earlier in the season Slack missed four games through suspension for attempted striking, ending a four-year run where no Geelong player had fronted the tribunal. He remained a regular member of the side until 1940, when he was picked just once.
