= Rupe McDonald =

Australian rules footballer (1910–1969)

Personal information
- Full name: Rupert John McDonald
- Born: 17 March 1910; Winchelsea, Victoria
- Died: 6 November 1969 (aged 59); Winchelsea, Victoria
- Original team: Winchelsea
- Height: 184 cm (6 ft 0 in)
- Weight: 87 kg (192 lb)

Playing career^{1}
Years	Club	Games (Goals)
1929–1935	Geelong	111 (2)
- ^{1} Playing statistics correct to the end of 1935.

Rupert John McDonald (17 March 1910 – 6 November 1969) was an Australian rules footballer who played with Geelong in the Victorian Football League (VFL).

McDonald was a half-back from Winchelsea, who played as a flanker in Geelong's 1931 premiership team. The 1931 VFL Grand Final was one of 10 finals that McDonald played during his seven-season career and he also played in a losing grand final the previous year. From 1930 to 1933, he put together 49 games in a row and played his 100th league match in Geelong's preliminary final loss to South Melbourne in 1934.
