= Tim Godfrey (footballer) =

Australian rules footballer

Personal information
- Full name: Timothy Godfrey
- Nickname: Tim
- Born: 30 July 1957 (age 69)
- Original team: Cobden
- Height: 188 cm (6 ft 2 in)
- Weight: 81 kg (179 lb)

Playing career^{1}
| Years | Club | Games (Goals) |
| 1976–1978 | Fitzroy | 11 (0) |
- ^{1} Playing statistics correct to the end of 1978.

Timothy Godfrey is a former Australian rules footballer, who played for the Fitzroy Football Club in the Victorian Football League (VFL).
