= Alan Marsham =

Australian rules footballer

- Marsham with Williamstown in 1941

Personal information
- Full name: Alan Robert Marsham
- Born: 6 August 1920; Geelong, Victoria
- Died: 7 April 1990 (aged 69); Geelong, Victoria
- Original team: Sea Scouts
- Height: 185 cm (6 ft 1 in)
- Weight: 83 kg (183 lb)

Playing career^{1}
Years	Club	Games (Goals)
1939–40, 1945–46	Geelong	24 (5)
- ^{1} Playing statistics correct to the end of 1946.

Alan Robert Marsham (6 August 1920 – 7 April 1990) was an Australian rules footballer who played for the Geelong Football Club in the Victorian Football League (VFL).

== Family ==
The son of former Geelong footballer Harry "Nipper" Marsham (1890-1932) and Olive Gertrude Elizabeth Marsham, nee McQueen (1893–1950), Alan Robert Marsham was born in Geelong on 6 August 1920.

Alan Marsham married Marie Elaine Dawson in 1943.

== Education ==
He attended Geelong College.

== Williamstown (VFA) ==
In 1941 he transferred to the VFA club Williamstown.
