= Bill Kuhlken =

Australian rules footballer

Personal information
- Full name: William Henry Kuhlken
- Born: 17 April 1910; Bendigo, Victoria
- Died: 5 September 1957 (aged 47); Fitzroy, Victoria
- Original team: Port Melbourne (VFA)
- Position: Ruck

Playing career^{1}
Years	Club	Games (Goals)
1927–1929	Port Melbourne	35 (104)
1930–1936	Geelong	80 (101)
1936–1937	Carlton	9 (5)
Total		124 (210)
- ^{1} Playing statistics correct to the end of 1937.

William Henry Kuhlken (17 April 1910 – 5 September 1957) was an Australian rules footballer who played with Geelong and Carlton.

== Football ==
=== Carlton (VFL) ===
In 1936 he transferred from Geelong to Carlton, in exchange for George Dougherty, who went to Geelong.

== Death ==
He died (following a heart attack) at St Vincent's Hospital, Melbourne on 5 September 1957.
