= Jack Young (Australian rules footballer) =

Australian rules footballer

Personal information
- Full name: John Edward Young
- Born: 14 August 1908; Hamilton, Victoria
- Died: 1 December 1979 (aged 71); Parkville, Victoria
- Original team: Yarrawonga
- Height: 191 cm (6 ft 3 in)
- Weight: 101 kg (223 lb)

Playing career^{1}
Years	Club	Games (Goals)
1932–1933	Carlton	14 (0)
1934	Melbourne	6 (0)
Total		20 (0)
- ^{1} Playing statistics correct to the end of 1934.

John Edward Young (14 August 1908 – 1 December 1979) was an Australian rules footballer who played with Carlton and Melbourne in the Victorian Football League (VFL).
