= Bernie Moran =

Australian rules footballer

Personal information
- Full name: Bernard Michael Moran
- Born: 13 October 1930; Cobden, Victoria
- Died: 21 April 2002 (aged 71)
- Original team: Cobden
- Height: 185 cm (6 ft 1 in)
- Weight: 84 kg (185 lb)

Playing career^{1}
Years	Club	Games (Goals)
1954–1955	Carlton	21 (5)
- ^{1} Playing statistics correct to the end of 1955.

Bernard Michael Moran (13 October 1930 – 21 April 2002) was an Australian rules footballer who played for the Carlton Football Club in the Victorian Football League (VFL).
