= Gordon Mackie (footballer) =

Australian rules footballer, born 1909

Personal information
- Full name: Gordon John Mackie
- Born: 18 July 1909; Heidelberg, Victoria
- Died: 6 September 1983 (aged 74); Dingley Village, Victoria
- Original team: Preston
- Height: 187 cm (6 ft 2 in)
- Weight: 83 kg (183 lb)
- Position: Centre half back

Playing career^{1}
Years	Club	Games (Goals)
1932–36	Carlton	60 (2)
- ^{1} Playing statistics correct to the end of 1936.

Gordon John Mackie (18 July 1909 – 6 September 1983) was an Australian rules footballer who played for Carlton in the Victorian Football League (VFL) during the 1930s.

Mackie started his career in the VFA at Preston, in 1928. He was granted a clearance in Carlton in 1932, after initial refusal, but missed some early rounds as a result. A centre half back, he played in the losing 1932 VFL Grand Final team and was Carlton's best at the 1933 Brownlow Medal count. He retired after the 1936 season because of injury.
