= George Dougherty =

Australian rules footballer, born 1913

Personal information
- Full name: George Mervyn Dougherty
- Born: 9 December 1913; Beulah, Victoria
- Died: 21 November 1991 (aged 77); Geelong, Victoria
- Original team: Beulah
- Height: 191 cm (6 ft 3 in)
- Weight: 93 kg (205 lb)

Playing career^{1}
Years	Club	Games (Goals)
1934–1936	Carlton	17 (15)
1936–1941	Geelong	98 (158)
1942–1943	Footscray	25 (30)
1944–1945	Geelong	23 (30)
1945	South Melbourne	10 (26)
Total		173 (259)
- ^{1} Playing statistics correct to the end of 1945.

Career highlights
- Geelong premiership player - 1937

George Mervyn Dougherty (9 December 1913 – 21 November 1991) was an Australian rules footballer who played for four clubs in the Victorian Football League (VFL) from 1934 to 1945.

== Family ==
The son of Cahir Dougherty (1878–1958), and Helen Mary "Nellie" Dougherty (1885–1951), née Smeaton, George Mervyn Dougherty was born at Beulah, Victoria on 9 December 1913.

His brother, Noel Dougherty (1916-), tried out with Carlton (in 1933), Fitzroy (in 1935), and Geelong (in 1937), and another brother, Lyle Dougherty (1926–2015), tried out with South Melbourne (in 1950).

He married Verlie Norma Clifford (1921–1991) in 1941.

== Football ==
=== Carlton (VFL) ===
A ruckman who also played up forward, recruited from the Beulah Football Club in the Southern Mallee Football League, Dougherty started his VFL career with Carlton Football Club.

=== Geelong (VFL) ===
After two and a half seasons with Carlton, he transferred to Geelong (in exchange for Bill Kuhlken, who went to Carlton) where he would play his best football. Dougherty was a key member of Geelong's 1937 premiership winning side, kicking 38 goals for the year and was the starting ruckman in their Grand Final win over Collingwood. In 1940 he polled well in the Brownlow Medal, finishing equal seventh.

=== Footscray (VFL) ===
Dougherty moved to Footscray in 1942, when Geelong were unable to compete in the 1942 and 1943 VFL competitions, due to wartime restrictions on travel.

=== Geelong (VFL) ===
He returned to Geelong in 1944, when the team resumesd its place in the VFL competition, due to the earlier travel restrictions being relaxed.

=== South Melbourne (VFL) ===
Dougherty spent a year at South Melbourne in the 1945 season, before retiring due to the broken ankle he sustained when playing against Hawthorn in the last home-and-away match of the 1945 season.

== Death ==
He died at Geelong, Victoria, on 21 November 1991.
