= Ron Henriksen =

Australian rules footballer

Personal information
- Full name: Ron Henriksen
- Born: September 25, 1936 (age 90)
- Original team: Cobden
- Height: 179 cm (5 ft 10 in)
- Weight: 80 kg (176 lb)

Playing career^{1}
Years	Club	Games (Goals)
1956–58	Footscray	19 (0)
- ^{1} Playing statistics correct to the end of 1958.

Ron Henriksen (born 25 September 1936) is a former Australian rules footballer who played with Footscray in the Victorian Football League (VFL).
