= Bill Ford (footballer) =

Australian rules footballer

Personal information
- Full name: William Thomas Ford
- Born: 18 July 1906; Tallygaroopna, Victoria
- Died: 10 May 1984 (aged 77); Sea Lake, Victoria
- Original team: Tallygaroopna
- Height: 191 cm (6 ft 3 in)
- Weight: 80 kg (176 lb)
- Position: Ruck

Playing career^{1}
Years	Club	Games (Goals)
1927	Richmond	1 (1)
1934–1937	Hawthorn	56 (38)
Total		57 (39)
- ^{1} Playing statistics correct to the end of 1937.

William Thomas Ford (18 July 1906 – 10 May 1984) was an Australian rules footballer who played with Richmond and Hawthorn in the Victorian Football League (VFL), and with Camberwell in the VFA.
