= Jim Crowe (footballer) =

Australian rules footballer

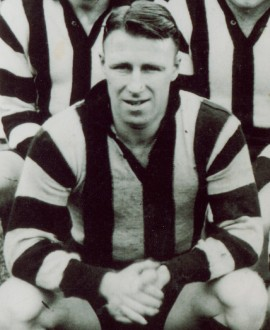
- Crowe during his Collingwood career

Personal information
- Full name: James Patrick Crowe
- Born: 18 May 1909; Carlton, Victoria
- Died: 21 May 1979 (aged 70); Kew East, Victoria
- Original team: Royal Rovers
- Debut: Round 1, 1929, Carlton vs. Essendon, at Princes Park
- Height: 171 cm (5 ft 7 in)
- Weight: 72 kg (159 lb)
- Position: Forward/Defender

Playing career^{1}
Years	Club	Games (Goals)
1929–1934	Carlton	83 (37)
1936–1937	Collingwood	21 (0)
Total		104 (37)

Coaching career
Years	Club	Games (W–L–D)
1947	Footscray	19 (8–10–1)
- ^{1} Playing statistics correct to the end of 1937.

James Patrick Crowe (18 May 1909 – 21 May 1979) was an Australian rules footballer who played for Carlton and Collingwood in the Victorian Football League (VFL).

Crowe started his career as a half forward flanker before being moved into defence as a rebound player. He was a member of Carlton's losing 1932 Grand Final side and in 1936 crossed to Collingwood. In his first year with Collingwood he played in a premiership, occupying a back pocket in the Grand Final.

In 1947 he coached Footscray for a season, with the club finishing ninth out of the twelve clubs.
