= Bernie Hore =

Australian rules footballer

Personal information
- Full name: William Bernard Hore
- Born: 2 June 1916; Albury, New South Wales
- Died: 15 October 1994 (aged 78)
- Original team: Rand
- Height: 183 cm (6 ft 0 in)
- Weight: 83 kg (183 lb)

Playing career^{1}
Years	Club	Games (Goals)
1936–1940	Geelong	60 (2)
- ^{1} Playing statistics correct to the end of 1940.

William Bernard Hore (2 June 1916 – 15 October 1994) was an Australian rules footballer who played with Geelong in the Victorian Football League (VFL).

Hore, was a defender, who could also play as a ruckman.

Hore came to the VFL from Rand, New South Wales.

== Richmond (VFL) ==
According to evidence given by Mr J. Smith of the Richmond Football Club on 13 May 1936 to the VFL's Permit and Umpires' Committee,

…the Richmond club had brought Hore from The Rand, and had found him work. Hore had signed the papers agreeing to play with Richmond, but was residentially encumbered to the Geelong club. He had visited that club [viz., Geelong] on Monday night [11 May], in company with Mr. Smith, to apply for a clearance to Richmond. Hore had been interviewed by the officials of the Geelong club for about an hour, but when he returned to Mr. Smith he had said that he still desired to play with Richmond. Mr. Smith said that he had been given a tacit understanding by Geelong officials that the clearance would be granted.
At a meeting of the Richmond Football club on Tuesday night [12 May] Hore had reiterated his desire to play with Richmond, yet by yesterday [13 May] he had changed his mind and was now applying for a transfer to Geelong.
In answer to questions put by Mr. Smith, Hore admitted the truth of the facts, as stated. He said that his reason for changing his mind was that he had been offered a better position by the Geelong club, and would be able to learn a trade. In addition, he would be able to play League football this season, instead of having to remain out of the game for 12 months, as would be the case if he went to Richmond. The Argus, 14 May 1936.

== Geelong (VFL) ==
He made most of his appearances in 1937 and 1938, playing 19 games in each year. In the 1937 VFL Grand Final win over Collingwood, Hore had 21 kicks from the back pocket.

== Coburg (VFA) ==
He also played for Victorian Football Association club Coburg, crossing without a clearance in 1941 during the throw-pass era; however he missed the 1941 Grand Final through suspension.

== Military service ==
He served in the Northern Territory with the 23rd/21st Battalion during World War II.

== Coburg (VFA) ==
He returned to play with Coburg after the war.
