= Percy Bowyer =

Australian rules footballer (1909–1998)

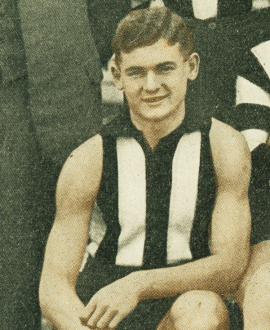
- Bowyer during his Collingwood career

Personal information
- Full name: Harry Percy Bowyer
- Born: 6 September 1909; Langley, Buckinghamshire, England
- Died: 17 November 1998 (aged 89)
- Original team: St Saviours
- Height: 179 cm (5 ft 10 in)
- Weight: 71 kg (157 lb)

Playing career^{1}
Years	Club	Games (Goals)
1928–1938	Collingwood	154 (33)
- ^{1} Playing statistics correct to the end of 1938.

Career highlights
- Collingwood Premierships – 1929, 1930, 1935, 1936

Harry Percy Bowyer (6 September 1909 – 17 November 1998) was an Australian rules footballer who played with Collingwood in the Victorian Football League (VFL).

Born in England, Bowyer was part of a strong Collingwood side during his career and played in four premiership teams. He played on a wing and back pocket in the 1929 and 1930 premierships, respectively, and in the ruck for their 1935 and 1936 premierships. Bowyer retired in 1938 after believing, wrongly, that he had a stomach ulcer.
