= Frank Mockridge =

Australian rules footballer

Personal information
- Full name: Albert Frank Mockridge
- Born: 21 October 1903; Geelong, Victoria
- Died: 27 March 1990 (aged 86); Geelong, Victoria
- Original team: Chilwell
- Height: 174 cm (5 ft 9 in)
- Weight: 79 kg (174 lb)

Playing career^{1}
Years	Club	Games (Goals)
1925–1931	Geelong	72 (2)
- ^{1} Playing statistics correct to the end of 1931.

Albert Frank Mockridge (21 October 1903 – 27 March 1990) was an Australian rules footballer who played with Geelong in the Victorian Football League (VFL).

Mockridge came to Geelong from Chilwell and was used mostly as a defender during his league career.

He was a back pocket in the 1930 VFL Grand Final, which Geelong lost to Collingwood. In 1931 he made just five appearances in the home and away season but was picked for his second successive grand final, as a reserve. Geelong won by 20 points and Mockridge, despite remaining on the bench for the entire game, finished his career with a premiership.
