= Max Reed (Australian footballer) =

Australian rules footballer

Personal information
- Full name: Maxwell Stanley Reed
- Born: 28 May 1942
- Died: 2 September 2013 (aged 71)
- Original team: Cobden (HFL)
- Height: 171 cm (5 ft 7 in)
- Weight: 79 kg (174 lb)

Playing career^{1}
Years	Club	Games (Goals)
1963	St Kilda	1 (0)
- ^{1} Playing statistics correct to the end of 1963.

Maxwell Stanley Reed (28 May 1942 – 2 September 2013) was an Australian rules footballer who played with St Kilda in the Victorian Football League (VFL).
