= Les Hardiman =

Australian rules footballer (1911–1962)

Personal information
- Full name: Leslie Francis Hardiman
- Born: 1 April 1911; Geelong, Victoria
- Died: 29 June 1962 (aged 51); Werribee, Victoria
- Original team: Chilwell (GJFA)
- Height: 185 cm (6 ft 1 in)
- Weight: 81 kg (179 lb)

Playing career^{1}
Years	Club	Games (Goals)
1929-1937	Geelong	135 (236)
1938–1941	Subiaco	69 (122)
1946–1948	Yarraville (VFA)	35 (83)
1949	Brunswick (VFA)	14 (43)
Total		253 (484)

Coaching career
Years	Club	Games (W–L–D)
1947	Yarraville	22 (7–15–0)
- ^{1} Playing statistics correct to the end of 1949.

Career highlights
- 2× VFL Premiership player: (1931, 1937); Geelong Team of the Century; Carji Greeves Medal: (1933); Subiaco Fairest & Best 1940; Subiaco Leading Goal Scorer 1940

Leslie Francis Hardiman (1 April 1911 – 29 June 1962) was an Australian rules footballer who played for the Geelong Football Club in the Victorian Football League (VFL) and for the Subiaco Football Club in the Western Australian National Football League (WANFL).

Hardiman was nicknamed 'Splinter' and was a key position player for Geelong. A premiership player with the club in 1931 and 1937, he also won their best and fairest award Theo Lewis Cup in 1933.

== Early years and playing career ==
Hardiman was the third of seven children born to John Francis (Jack) Hardiman and Julia née Leary (1881—1963). Father Jack had played 21 games for Geelong and his eldest brother, Harold Peter, would also play for Geelong.

He represented Victoria 5 times in interstate football and was named on Geelong's interchange bench in their official 'Team of the Century'.

Hardiman had a starring role in the 1937 VFL Grand Final win over Collingwood, a game regarded by many at the time as the greatest Grand final ever played. Initially named at full-forward, he was switched to centre half-back after quarter time to mind Magpie star Ron Todd, who had kicked three of Collingwood's six goals in the first quarter. He would restrict Todd to only one more goal for the rest of the game and be rated among Geelong's best players that day. Even better was that he shared the premiership success with his brother Peter, who was also counted among Geelong's best for his duel in the ruck with Albert Collier.

However, just one month later it was revealed that Hardiman would be joining fellow Victorian footballers Haydn Bunton Sr. and Keith Shea in transferring to Subiaco. They had been courted by Subiaco secretary Tom Outridge Sr. during the 1937 Perth Carnival while playing for Victoria, and would have been aware that only five years before a number of Subiaco footballers had made their way over to play for South Melbourne, part of what is known in Australian football folklore as the "Foreign Legion". Hardiman told The West Australian that he had been advised by a Geelong official that there was every possibility of his securing a clearance if the club were satisfied that he had firmly established himself in Western Australia and had bettered his position in life. He also added that he intended to be married before he left Melbourne.

Hardiman added a further 69 league games over the next four seasons. In 1938 he played two games for his adopted state against South Australia, two years later he won the Maroons' 1940 fairest and best award and was also the leading goal scorer with 46 goals.

In February 1942, Hardiman, now living in Mount Lawley, enlisted for duty with the Australian Army and served with the 2/11th Infantry Battalion during World War 2. By the time he was discharged after the war had ended, in November 1945, he had risen to the rank of corporal.

In 1962, Hardiman was killed in a car accident.

In 1996 Les Hardiman was named on the interchange in the Geelong Football Club team the century.

== Bibliography ==
- Main, Jim (2009). "The Greatest Game of all". In Murray, John (ed.). We are Geelong : the story of the Geelong Football Club since 1859. The Slattery Media Group. pp. 54–63. ISBN 9780980597301.
