= Horace Edmonds =

Australian rules footballer, born 1908

Horrie Edmonds
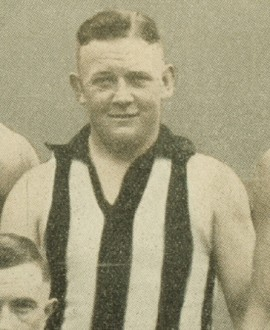
- Edmonds during his Collingwood career

Personal information
- Full name: Horace Stephens Edmonds
- Nickname: Tubby
- Born: 23 December 1908; Diamond Creek, Victoria
- Died: 18 July 1975 (aged 66); Bundoora, Victoria
- Original team: Middle Park CYMS (CYMSFA)/ Diamond Creek
- Height: 175 cm (5 ft 9 in)
- Weight: 84.5 kg (186 lb)

Playing career^{1}
| Years | Club | Games (Goals) |
| 1929–1934 | Collingwood | 79 (124) |
| 1934–1935 | Richmond | 30 (20) |
| 1937 | Footscray | 1 (0) |
| Total | | 110 (144) |
- ^{1} Playing statistics correct to the end of 1937.

Career highlights
- Collingwood Premiership Player 1929, 1930; Richmond Premiership Player 1934; Footscray Seconds Captain/Coach 1937; Collingwood Seconds Captain/Coach 1939-1941; Collingwood Seconds Premiership Captain/Coach 1940; Hawthorn Seconds/Reserves Coach 1952-1960; Hawthorn Seconds/Reserves Premiership Coach 1958, 1959

Horace Stephens 'Tubby' Edmonds (23 December 1908 – 18 July 1975) was an Australian rules footballer who played in the VFL between 1929 and 1934 for the Collingwood Football Club, between 1934 and 1935 for the Richmond Football Club and one game for the Footscray Football Club in 1937.

== Family ==
The son of Neil Flower Edmonds (1871–1918), and Johannah "Annie" Edmonds (1873–1951), née Long, later Mrs. William Merriman, Horace Stephens Edmonds was born at Diamond Creek, Victoria on 23 December 1908.

Horace Edmonds married to Jessie Adeline Williams (1910–1993) in 1931. They had two sons, William (1938–2021) and Robert (1946–2006). Robert played a short time for Richmond Reserves.

== Football ==
=== Richmond (VFL) ===
He was granted a clearance from Collingwood to Richmond on 30 June 1934.

=== Brighton (VFA) ===
Cleared from Sandringham in June 1938, he played two senior games for Brighton in 1938.

=== Hawthorn (VFL) ===
He played in two games for the Hawthorn Reserves in 1953, at the age of 46.

== Recognition ==
He was awarded a Richmond Life Membership posthumously in 2018.
