= Jack Twyford =

Australian rules footballer

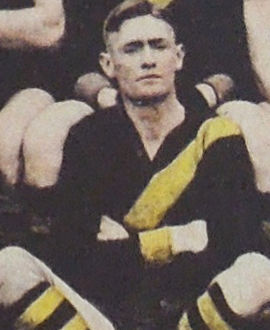
- Twyford during his Richmond career

Personal information
- Born: 12 October 1908
- Died: 15 August 1991 (aged 82)
- Original team: Eltham (DVFL)
- Height: 173 cm (5 ft 8 in)
- Weight: 68 kg (150 lb)

Playing career^{1}
Years	Club	Games (Goals)
1929	South Melbourne	2 (2)
1931–1933	Richmond	37 (14)
1934	Collingwood	2 (0)
Total		41 (16)
- ^{1} Playing statistics correct to the end of 1934.

Career highlights
- Richmond Premiership Player 1932

Jack Twyford (12 October 1908 – 15 August 1991) was an Australian rules footballer who played in the VFL in 1929 for the South Melbourne Football Club, between 1930 and 1933 for the Richmond Football Club and in 1934 for the Collingwood Football Club.
