= Jack Evans (footballer, born 1908) =

Australian rules footballer, born 1908

Personal information
- Born: 19 January 1908; Moolap, Victoria
- Died: 10 July 1960 (aged 52); Geelong, Victoria
- Original team: Minyip
- Height: 182 cm (6 ft 0 in)
- Weight: 81 kg (179 lb)

Playing career^{1}
Years	Club	Games (Goals)
1929–1938	Geelong	149 (146)
- ^{1} Playing statistics correct to the end of 1938.

Career highlights
- Geelong premiership player - 1931 & 1937; Geelong leading goal-kicker - 1935

Jack 'Copper' Evans (19 January 1908 – 10 July 1960) was an Australian rules footballer who played with Geelong in the Victorian Football League (VFL) during the 1930s.

Although primarily a ruckman, Evans could also play at centre half-forward and was Geelong's top goalkicker in 1935 with 32 goals. He played in two premiership sides, the first in 1931, and the second in 1937 when he kicked six goals in the Grand Final against Collingwood. Evans was a regular Victorian interstate representative, playing a total of nine games for his state. A policeman from 1932 to 1960, Evans was inducted into the Victoria Police Sporting Hall Of Fame on 13 September 2011.
