= Jack Collins (footballer, born 1910) =

Australian rules footballer (1910–1972)

Personal information
- Full name: Jack Laurie Collins
- Born: 13 February 1910; Ballarat, Victoria
- Died: 1 March 1972 (aged 62); Geelong, Victoria
- Original team: Golden Point (BFL)
- Height: 183 cm (6 ft 0 in)
- Weight: 84 kg (185 lb)

Playing career^{1}
| Years | Club | Games (Goals) |
| 1929–34, 1938 | Geelong | 112 (112) |
- ^{1} Playing statistics correct to the end of 1938.

Jack Laurie Collins (13 February 1910 – 1 March 1972) is a former Australian rules footballer who played with Geelong in the VFL during the 1930s.

A centre half forward, Collins debuted for Geelong in 1929. He was a member of their 1931 premiership team and had his best season in 1938 when he finished equal 7th in the Brownlow Medal. Collins also represented Victoria 11 times in interstate football.

He was named as an emergency in Geelong's official 'Team of the Century'.
