= Fred Heifner =

Australian rules footballer, born 1909

Personal information
- Born: 23 August 1909
- Died: 27 January 1996 (aged 86); Perth Western Australia
- Original team: Specimen Hill/St Bartholomew/Richmond Districts
- Height: 180 cm (5 ft 11 in)
- Weight: 85.5 kg (188 lb)

Playing career^{1}
Years	Club	Games (Goals)
1929–1935	Richmond	100 (19)
- ^{1} Playing statistics correct to the end of 1935.

Career highlights
- Richmond Premiership Player 1932

Fred 'Fritz' Heifner (23 August 1909 – 27 January 1996) was an Australian rules footballer who played in the VFL between 1929 and 1935 for the Richmond Football Club.
