= Peter Hardiman =

Australian rules footballer, born 1905

Personal information
- Born: 20 February 1905
- Died: 8 November 1971 (aged 66)
- Original team: Chilwell
- Height: 182 cm (6 ft 0 in)
- Weight: 81 kg (179 lb)

Playing career^{1}
Years	Club	Games (Goals)
1927–1938	Geelong	160 (45)
- ^{1} Playing statistics correct to the end of 1938.

Harold "Peter" Hardiman (20 February 1905 – 8 November 1971) was an Australian rules footballer who played with Geelong in the Victorian Football League (VFL).

Although his name was Harold he was known during his football career as Peter so there would be no confusion between him and teammate Harold Craven.

Hardiman played much of his career beside brother Les and was used mostly as a follower. A premiership player in 1931, he earned Victorian interstate selection in the same year. Six years later he played in another Geelong premiership.

He is credited as being one of the last players from the club to regularly use the place kick during games.
