= Allan Everett (footballer) =

Australian rules footballer

Personal information
- Full name: Allan Everett
- Born: 12 April 1913
- Died: 22 October 2003 (aged 90)
- Original team: Lismore
- Height: 177 cm (5 ft 10 in)
- Weight: 85 kg (187 lb)
- Position: Back pocket

Playing career^{1}
Years	Club	Games (Goals)
1934–1940	Geelong	117 (25)

Coaching career
Years	Club	Games (W–L–D)
1940	Geelong	12 (7–5–0)
- ^{1} Playing statistics correct to the end of 1940.

Career highlights
- Geelong premiership player 1937

Allan Everett (12 April 1913 – 22 October 2003) was an Australian rules footballer who played with and coached Geelong in the Victorian Football League (VFL).

A hard running rebound defender, Everett was used mostly in the back pockets. He came to Geelong from Lismore and spent some of his early games at half forward. Everett, a dual VFL interstate representative, was a member of Geelong's premiership team in 1937. He was captain-coach of Geelong for part of the 1940 season and steered the club to seven wins.

He crossed to Victorian Football Association club Preston without a clearance in 1941.
