= 1931 VFL season =

35th season of the Victorian Football League (VFL)

1931 VFL premiership season

Overview
- Date: 2 May – 10 October 1931
- Teams: 12
- Premiers: Geelong; 2nd premiership
- Runners-up: Richmond; 6th runners-up result
- Minor premiers: Geelong; 4th minor premiership
- Brownlow Medallist: Haydn Bunton Sr. (Fitzroy); 26 votes
- Leading goalkicker medallist: Harry Vallence (Carlton); 72 goals

Attendance
- Matches played: 112
- Total attendance: 1,785,275 (15,940 per match)
- Highest (H&A): 40,000 (round 4, Richmond v Collingwood)
- Highest (finals): 60,712 (grand final, Richmond v Geelong)

The 1931 VFL season was the 35th season of the Victorian Football League (VFL), the highest-level senior Australian rules football competition in Victoria. The season featured twelve clubs and ran from 2 May to 10 October, comprising an 18-match home-and-away season followed by a four-week finals series featuring the top four clubs.

Geelong won the premiership, defeating Richmond by 20 points in the 1931 VFL grand final; it was Geelong's second VFL premiership. Geelong also won the minor premiership by finishing atop the home-and-away ladder with a 15–3 win–loss record. Fitzroy's Haydn Bunton Sr. won the Brownlow Medal as the league's best and fairest player, and Carlton's Harry Vallence won the leading goalkicker medal as the league's leading goalkicker.

== Background ==
In 1931, the VFL competition consisted of twelve teams of 18 on-the-field players each, plus one substitute player, known as the 19th man. A player could be substituted for any reason; however, once substituted, a player could not return to the field of play under any circumstances.

Teams played each other in a home-and-away season of 18 rounds; matches 12 to 18 were the "home-and-way reverse" of matches 1 to 7.

Once the 18-round home-and-away season had finished, the 1931 VFL Premiers were determined by the specific format and conventions of the Page–McIntyre system. This was the first season to feature the new finals format, with the winner of the 2nd Semi Final going direct through to the Grand Final, and the loser through to a Preliminary Final against the winner of the 1st Semi Final. The league predominantly used variations of the Argus Challenge System over the previous thirty seasons.

== Home-and-away season ==
=== Round 1 ===
Home team	Home team score	Away team	Away team score	Venue	Crowd	Date
North Melbourne	11.17 (83)	South Melbourne	19.21 (135)	Arden Street Oval	10,000	2 May 1931
Footscray	8.13 (61)	Hawthorn	9.6 (60)	Western Oval	12,000	2 May 1931
Collingwood	13.14 (92)	Geelong	12.15 (87)	Victoria Park	16,000	2 May 1931
Carlton	15.8 (98)	Richmond	14.23 (107)	Princes Park	26,500	2 May 1931
Melbourne	15.16 (106)	Fitzroy	14.10 (94)	MCG	19,330	2 May 1931
St Kilda	13.14 (92)	Essendon	11.14 (80)	Junction Oval	19,000	2 May 1931

=== Round 2 ===
Home team	Home team score	Away team	Away team score	Venue	Crowd	Date
Geelong	20.6 (126)	St Kilda	7.12 (54)	Corio Oval	9,500	9 May 1931
Essendon	12.5 (77)	Melbourne	10.13 (73)	Windy Hill	15,000	9 May 1931
Richmond	30.19 (199)	North Melbourne	4.7 (31)	Punt Road Oval	11,000	9 May 1931
South Melbourne	13.13 (91)	Footscray	16.15 (111)	Lake Oval	20,000	9 May 1931
Hawthorn	8.17 (65)	Collingwood	11.18 (84)	Glenferrie Oval	15,000	9 May 1931
Fitzroy	13.15 (93)	Carlton	19.19 (133)	Brunswick Street Oval	35,000	9 May 1931

=== Round 3 ===
Home team	Home team score	Away team	Away team score	Venue	Crowd	Date
Footscray	7.10 (52)	Richmond	13.16 (94)	Western Oval	30,000	16 May 1931
Collingwood	13.16 (94)	South Melbourne	10.13 (73)	Victoria Park	15,000	16 May 1931
Carlton	18.18 (126)	Essendon	5.14 (44)	Princes Park	20,000	16 May 1931
St Kilda	10.12 (72)	Hawthorn	10.8 (68)	Junction Oval	14,000	16 May 1931
Melbourne	12.15 (87)	Geelong	11.17 (83)	MCG	19,767	16 May 1931
North Melbourne	6.12 (48)	Fitzroy	12.16 (88)	Arden Street Oval	7,000	16 May 1931

=== Round 4 ===
Home team	Home team score	Away team	Away team score	Venue	Crowd	Date
Hawthorn	13.16 (94)	Melbourne	16.13 (109)	Glenferrie Oval	10,000	23 May 1931
Fitzroy	10.15 (75)	Footscray	12.12 (84)	Brunswick Street Oval	14,000	23 May 1931
Essendon	12.13 (85)	North Melbourne	9.9 (63)	Windy Hill	10,000	23 May 1931
South Melbourne	18.19 (127)	St Kilda	16.10 (106)	Lake Oval	18,000	23 May 1931
Richmond	10.12 (72)	Collingwood	9.14 (68)	Punt Road Oval	40,000	23 May 1931
Geelong	11.14 (80)	Carlton	11.8 (74)	Corio Oval	12,500	23 May 1931

=== Round 5 ===
Home team	Home team score	Away team	Away team score	Venue	Crowd	Date
Hawthorn	11.10 (76)	South Melbourne	11.13 (79)	Glenferrie Oval	11,000	30 May 1931
Essendon	10.12 (72)	Richmond	11.20 (86)	Windy Hill	15,000	30 May 1931
Carlton	16.11 (107)	Collingwood	13.13 (91)	Princes Park	35,000	30 May 1931
St Kilda	13.19 (97)	North Melbourne	7.10 (52)	Junction Oval	10,000	30 May 1931
Melbourne	13.9 (87)	Footscray	10.11 (71)	MCG	20,244	30 May 1931
Geelong	20.22 (142)	Fitzroy	12.9 (81)	Corio Oval	9,000	30 May 1931

=== Round 6 ===
Round 6 was a split round, but the two-halves of the round were unusually played almost three weeks apart. Three matches played on King's Birthday Monday (8 June), and the other three matches played Saturday 27 June – the Saturday between Rounds 8 and 9. This means that six teams played their Round 7 and 8 matches before their Round 6 match.

Home team	Home team score	Away team	Away team score	Venue	Crowd	Date
Collingwood	15.10 (100)	St Kilda	10.17 (77)	Victoria Park	16,000	8 June 1931
North Melbourne	7.17 (59)	Melbourne	15.8 (98)	Arden Street Oval	7,000	8 June 1931
South Melbourne	6.8 (44)	Geelong	13.15 (93)	Lake Oval	30,000	8 June 1931
Richmond	9.15 (69)	Hawthorn	8.10 (58)	Punt Road Oval	19,000	27 June 1931
Fitzroy	7.14 (56)	Essendon	10.10 (70)	Brunswick Street Oval	12,000	27 June 1931
Footscray	8.8 (56)	Carlton	8.11 (59)	Western Oval	24,000	27 June 1931

=== Round 7 ===
Home team	Home team score	Away team	Away team score	Venue	Crowd	Date
Geelong	12.15 (87)	Richmond	8.12 (60)	Corio Oval	18,250	13 June 1931
Footscray	13.8 (86)	North Melbourne	5.13 (43)	Western Oval	11,000	13 June 1931
Fitzroy	14.14 (98)	South Melbourne	16.15 (111)	Brunswick Street Oval	12,000	13 June 1931
Essendon	8.12 (60)	Hawthorn	12.8 (80)	Windy Hill	10,000	13 June 1931
Melbourne	7.12 (54)	Collingwood	10.11 (71)	MCG	26,436	13 June 1931
St Kilda	8.11 (59)	Carlton	12.18 (90)	Junction Oval	24,000	13 June 1931

=== Round 8 ===
Home team	Home team score	Away team	Away team score	Venue	Crowd	Date
Richmond	12.12 (84)	South Melbourne	7.15 (57)	Punt Road Oval	18,000	20 June 1931
Essendon	7.13 (55)	Geelong	13.11 (89)	Windy Hill	10,000	20 June 1931
Collingwood	22.22 (154)	North Melbourne	9.10 (64)	Victoria Park	6,000	20 June 1931
Carlton	18.14 (122)	Melbourne	9.4 (58)	Princes Park	25,000	20 June 1931
St Kilda	7.10 (52)	Footscray	11.11 (77)	Junction Oval	17,000	20 June 1931
Hawthorn	12.8 (80)	Fitzroy	7.14 (56)	Glenferrie Oval	8,000	20 June 1931

=== Round 9 ===
Home team	Home team score	Away team	Away team score	Venue	Crowd	Date
Melbourne	4.12 (36)	St Kilda	9.9 (63)	MCG	15,826	4 July 1931
Geelong	13.9 (87)	Hawthorn	9.7 (61)	Corio Oval	9,500	4 July 1931
Fitzroy	8.13 (61)	Richmond	14.17 (101)	Brunswick Street Oval	15,000	4 July 1931
South Melbourne	10.13 (73)	Essendon	9.9 (63)	Lake Oval	11,000	4 July 1931
Footscray	4.16 (40)	Collingwood	6.8 (44)	Western Oval	21,500	4 July 1931
North Melbourne	7.8 (50)	Carlton	20.10 (130)	Arden Street Oval	10,000	4 July 1931

=== Round 10 ===
Home team	Home team score	Away team	Away team score	Venue	Crowd	Date
Hawthorn	14.12 (96)	North Melbourne	3.6 (24)	Glenferrie Oval	4,000	11 July 1931
Fitzroy	8.10 (58)	St Kilda	12.18 (90)	Brunswick Street Oval	11,000	11 July 1931
Richmond	8.18 (66)	Melbourne	7.11 (53)	Punt Road Oval	11,000	11 July 1931
Geelong	7.10 (52)	Footscray	3.5 (23)	Corio Oval	9,000	11 July 1931
Essendon	12.9 (81)	Collingwood	8.9 (57)	Windy Hill	10,000	11 July 1931
South Melbourne	10.12 (72)	Carlton	11.11 (77)	Lake Oval	16,000	11 July 1931

=== Round 11 ===
Home team	Home team score	Away team	Away team score	Venue	Crowd	Date
Melbourne	4.7 (31)	South Melbourne	12.10 (82)	MCG	15,258	18 July 1931
Collingwood	14.20 (104)	Fitzroy	8.10 (58)	Victoria Park	12,000	18 July 1931
Carlton	16.15 (111)	Hawthorn	5.8 (38)	Princes Park	17,000	18 July 1931
St Kilda	6.12 (48)	Richmond	11.19 (85)	Junction Oval	24,000	18 July 1931
North Melbourne	9.10 (64)	Geelong	19.17 (131)	Arden Street Oval	4,000	18 July 1931
Footscray	8.10 (58)	Essendon	12.13 (85)	Western Oval	19,000	18 July 1931

=== Round 12 ===
Home team	Home team score	Away team	Away team score	Venue	Crowd	Date
Fitzroy	11.11 (77)	Melbourne	9.12 (66)	Brunswick Street Oval	8,000	25 July 1931
Essendon	15.14 (104)	St Kilda	9.5 (59)	Windy Hill	15,000	25 July 1931
South Melbourne	13.16 (94)	North Melbourne	9.12 (66)	Lake Oval	7,500	25 July 1931
Hawthorn	8.5 (53)	Footscray	6.19 (55)	Glenferrie Oval	8,000	25 July 1931
Geelong	4.19 (43)	Collingwood	4.6 (30)	Corio Oval	15,000	25 July 1931
Richmond	8.17 (65)	Carlton	6.12 (48)	Punt Road Oval	36,000	25 July 1931

=== Round 13 ===
Home team	Home team score	Away team	Away team score	Venue	Crowd	Date
North Melbourne	9.15 (69)	Richmond	16.12 (108)	Arden Street Oval	8,000	1 August 1931
Footscray	9.14 (68)	South Melbourne	5.11 (41)	Western Oval	18,500	1 August 1931
Collingwood	15.13 (103)	Hawthorn	7.16 (58)	Victoria Park	9,000	1 August 1931
Carlton	18.13 (121)	Fitzroy	13.11 (89)	Princes Park	18,500	1 August 1931
St Kilda	7.10 (52)	Geelong	15.10 (100)	Junction Oval	16,000	1 August 1931
Melbourne	11.6 (72)	Essendon	10.11 (71)	MCG	13,828	1 August 1931

=== Round 14 ===
Home team	Home team score	Away team	Away team score	Venue	Crowd	Date
Hawthorn	11.9 (75)	St Kilda	11.11 (77)	Glenferrie Oval	8,000	8 August 1931
Geelong	11.11 (77)	Melbourne	6.9 (45)	Corio Oval	9,250	8 August 1931
Fitzroy	21.12 (138)	North Melbourne	8.12 (60)	Brunswick Street Oval	8,000	8 August 1931
Richmond	7.12 (54)	Footscray	10.18 (78)	Punt Road Oval	25,000	8 August 1931
South Melbourne	6.23 (59)	Collingwood	8.13 (61)	Lake Oval	14,000	8 August 1931
Essendon	18.14 (122)	Carlton	11.22 (88)	Windy Hill	20,000	8 August 1931

=== Round 15 ===
Home team	Home team score	Away team	Away team score	Venue	Crowd	Date
St Kilda	6.18 (54)	South Melbourne	8.14 (62)	Junction Oval	6,000	22 August 1931
Collingwood	6.10 (46)	Richmond	10.10 (70)	Victoria Park	15,000	22 August 1931
Carlton	5.9 (39)	Geelong	3.10 (28)	Princes Park	18,000	22 August 1931
Melbourne	13.15 (93)	Hawthorn	2.6 (18)	MCG	3,614	22 August 1931
Footscray	10.12 (72)	Fitzroy	6.6 (42)	Western Oval	8,000	22 August 1931
North Melbourne	9.7 (61)	Essendon	11.17 (83)	Arden Street Oval	4,000	22 August 1931

=== Round 16 ===
Home team	Home team score	Away team	Away team score	Venue	Crowd	Date
North Melbourne	7.8 (50)	St Kilda	11.15 (81)	Arden Street Oval	4,000	29 August 1931
Footscray	10.12 (72)	Melbourne	5.8 (38)	Western Oval	12,000	29 August 1931
Fitzroy	9.8 (62)	Geelong	9.22 (76)	Brunswick Street Oval	8,000	29 August 1931
South Melbourne	12.18 (90)	Hawthorn	9.5 (59)	Lake Oval	4,500	29 August 1931
Richmond	23.14 (152)	Essendon	15.11 (101)	Punt Road Oval	16,000	29 August 1931
Collingwood	20.15 (135)	Carlton	10.14 (74)	Victoria Park	20,000	29 August 1931

=== Round 17 ===
Home team	Home team score	Away team	Away team score	Venue	Crowd	Date
Melbourne	18.15 (123)	North Melbourne	11.13 (79)	MCG	3,944	5 September 1931
Hawthorn	5.13 (43)	Richmond	13.21 (99)	Glenferrie Oval	11,000	5 September 1931
Geelong	16.12 (108)	South Melbourne	8.11 (59)	Corio Oval	10,500	5 September 1931
Essendon	15.7 (97)	Fitzroy	12.8 (80)	Windy Hill	10,000	5 September 1931
Carlton	6.14 (50)	Footscray	7.12 (54)	Princes Park	39,000	5 September 1931
St Kilda	21.16 (142)	Collingwood	20.8 (128)	Junction Oval	17,000	5 September 1931

=== Round 18 ===
Home team	Home team score	Away team	Away team score	Venue	Crowd	Date
Collingwood	18.19 (127)	Melbourne	8.9 (57)	Victoria Park	14,000	12 September 1931
Carlton	10.6 (66)	St Kilda	6.12 (48)	Princes Park	25,000	12 September 1931
Richmond	8.8 (56)	Geelong	11.17 (83)	Punt Road Oval	15,000	12 September 1931
North Melbourne	3.16 (34)	Footscray	5.13 (43)	Arden Street Oval	9,000	12 September 1931
South Melbourne	5.14 (44)	Fitzroy	10.14 (74)	Lake Oval	4,500	12 September 1931
Hawthorn	8.15 (63)	Essendon	9.12 (66)	Glenferrie Oval	5,000	12 September 1931

== Ladder ==
(P)	Premiers
	Qualified for finals

#	Team	P	W	L	D	PF	PA	%	Pts
1	Geelong (P)	18	15	3	0	1572	1038	151.4	60
2	Richmond	18	15	3	0	1627	1153	141.1	60
3	Carlton	18	12	6	0	1613	1289	125.1	48
4	Collingwood	18	12	6	0	1589	1281	124.0	48
5	Footscray	18	12	6	0	1161	1054	110.2	48
6	Essendon	18	10	8	0	1416	1428	99.2	40
7	South Melbourne	18	9	9	0	1393	1406	99.1	36
8	Melbourne	18	8	10	0	1286	1403	91.7	32
9	St Kilda	18	8	10	0	1323	1484	89.2	32
10	Fitzroy	18	4	14	0	1380	1605	86.0	16
11	Hawthorn	18	3	15	0	1145	1395	82.1	12
12	North Melbourne	18	0	18	0	1000	1969	50.8	0

Rules for classification: 1. premiership points; 2. percentage; 3. points for
Average score: 76.4
Source: AFL Tables

== Finals series ==
=== Semi-finals ===
	1st Semi Final
Saturday, 19 September	Carlton 20.10 (130)	def.	Collingwood 5.12 (42)	MCG (crowd: 51,140)

	2nd Semi Final
Saturday, 26 September	Geelong 10.6 (66)	def. by	Richmond 15.9 (99)	MCG (crowd: 48,353)

=== Preliminary final ===
	Preliminary final
Saturday, 3 October	Geelong 11.17 (83)	def.	Carlton 11.11 (77)	MCG (crowd: 36,653)

=== Grand final ===
	Grand final
Saturday, 10 October (2:50 pm)	Geelong 9.14 (68)	def.	Richmond 7.6 (48)	MCG (crowd: 60,712)

== Season notes ==
- The VFL changed its Brownlow Medal voting procedure. The field umpire now voted for the three "fairest and best" on the ground in each match, casting 3, 2, and 1 votes. If there was a tie, the player with the most "3" votes would be declared the winner, then the most "2" votes; the countback system was altered retrospectively in 1989 so that the medal would be shared in the event of a tie. A player who had been suspended during the year was now considered ineligible for the medal.
- The VFL altered the manner in which it determined its premiership team. Abandoning the "amended Argus systems" that had operated from 1902 to 1930 (except in 1924), the VFL instituted the Page–McIntyre system which, amongst other innovations, guaranteed that there would be a "Grand Final" at the end of every season (this system continued to operate until 1972).
- Prior to the season, the VFL and the Grounds Management Association (which represented the operators of most of the VFL grounds) entered a dispute over the use of the grounds for football matches. The dispute covered financial arrangements and the demarcation between the football and cricket seasons. After arbitration from the Minister for Lands, it was agreed that cricket clubs would be required to pay the league £20 per 100 members, ending the long-standing practice of cricket club members receiving admission to football games without compensation to the football clubs; but that the grounds management would still retain all receipts for admission to reserve areas, with the league receiving none of these takings. During the stand-off, the VFL arranged for the Motordrome and the Exhibition Oval to be available to serve as alternative venues during the year, and drew up a fixture which saw each of those grounds holding twelve games – with Fitzroy, Carlton, North Melbourne, St Kilda, Collingwood and Essendon each to have played four of their nine home games at one of the replacement grounds.
- In round 2, Richmond set the record for highest score in a game, scoring 30.19 (199) against North Melbourne. This beat South Melbourne's 1919 record by ten points, and remained unbeaten until 1969.
- In Round 4, the huge crowd at the Punt Road Oval for the match between Richmond and Collingwood resulted in a crush, with fences being knocked over, and multiple injuries to spectators.
- In round 12, Carlton rover Tommy Downs was reported for kicking Richmond captain Maurie Hunter; despite the efforts of future Australian Prime Minister R. G. Menzies, KC, Downs was suspended for the remainder of the 1931 season and the whole of the 1932 season.
- The round 17 match between St Kilda and Collingwood was the first in which both sides scored twenty goals. Both Bill Mohr and Gordon Coventry kicked eleven goals. Coventry was the first to kick ten for a losing side.
- In the first semi-final, Carlton thrashed Collingwood 20.10 (130) to 5.12 (42). Harry "Soapy" Vallence, at full-forward for Carlton kicked a finals record 11 goals, including six in the last quarter.

== Awards ==
- The 1931 VFL Premiership team was Geelong.
- The VFL's leading goalkicker was Harry "Soapy" Vallence of Carlton with 86 goals.
- In his first VFL season, and only 20 years old, the winner of the 1931 Brownlow Medal was Haydn Bunton, Sr of Fitzroy with 26 votes.
- North Melbourne took the "wooden spoon" in 1931.
- The seconds premiership was won by Melbourne. Melbourne 8.13 (61) defeated Geelong 8.5 (53) in the Grand Final, played as a curtain-raiser to the firsts Grand Final on 10 October at the Melbourne Cricket Ground.

== Sources ==
- 1931 VFL season at AFL Tables
- 1931 VFL season at Australian Football
