= 1934 VFL grand final =

Grand final of the 1934 Victorian Football League season

1934 VFL Grand Final

Richmond	South Melbourne
19.14 (128)	12.17 (89)
	1	2	3	4
RICH	4.4 (28)	10.8 (68)	16.11 (107)	19.14 (128)
SM	4.3 (27)	6.5 (41)	6.11 (47)	12.17 (89)
- Date: 13 October 1934
- Stadium: Melbourne Cricket Ground
- Attendance: 65,335

The 1934 VFL Grand Final was an Australian rules football game contested between the Richmond Football Club and South Melbourne Football Club, held at the Melbourne Cricket Ground in Melbourne on 13 October 1934. It was the 36th annual Grand Final of the Victorian Football League, staged to determine the premiers for the 1934 VFL season. The match, attended by 65,335 spectators, was won by Richmond by a margin of 39 points, marking that club's fourth VFL/AFL premiership victory.

This was the second successive year in which the two teams met in the premiership decider, with South Melbourne having won the 1933 VFL Grand Final. It was also the seventh occasion in eight years that Richmond had appeared in a Grand Final. It had won just one of those earlier contests, in 1932.

== Score ==
Team	1	2	3	Final
Richmond	4.4	10.8	16.11	19.14 (128)
South Melbourne	4.3	6.5	6.11	12.17 (89)

== Teams ==
Richmond	S. Melbourne

Richmond
B:	Martin Bolger	Maurie Sheahan	Kevin O'Neill
HB:	Jack Baggott	Gordon Strang	Basil McCormack
C:	Stan Judkins	Eric Zschech	Allan Geddes
HF:	Thomas O'Halloran	David Baxter	Joe Murdoch
F:	Bert Foster	Jack Titus	Dick Harris
Foll:	Percy Bentley (c)	Jack Dyer	Ray Martin
Res:	Horace Edmonds		
Coach:	Percy Bentley		

South Melbourne
B:	Hec McKay	Jack Austin	Jock McKenzie
HB:	Bill Faul	Lin Richards	Hugh McLaughlin
C:	Harry Clarke	Len Thomas	Herbie Matthews
HF:	Peter Reville	Laurie Nash	Joe O'Meara
F:	Brighton Diggins	Bob Pratt	Ossie Bertram
Foll:	Jack Bissett (c)	Dinny Kelleher	Terry Brain
Res:	Wilbur Harris		
Coach:	Jack Bissett		

- Umpire – Bob Scott

== Statistics ==
=== Goalkickers ===
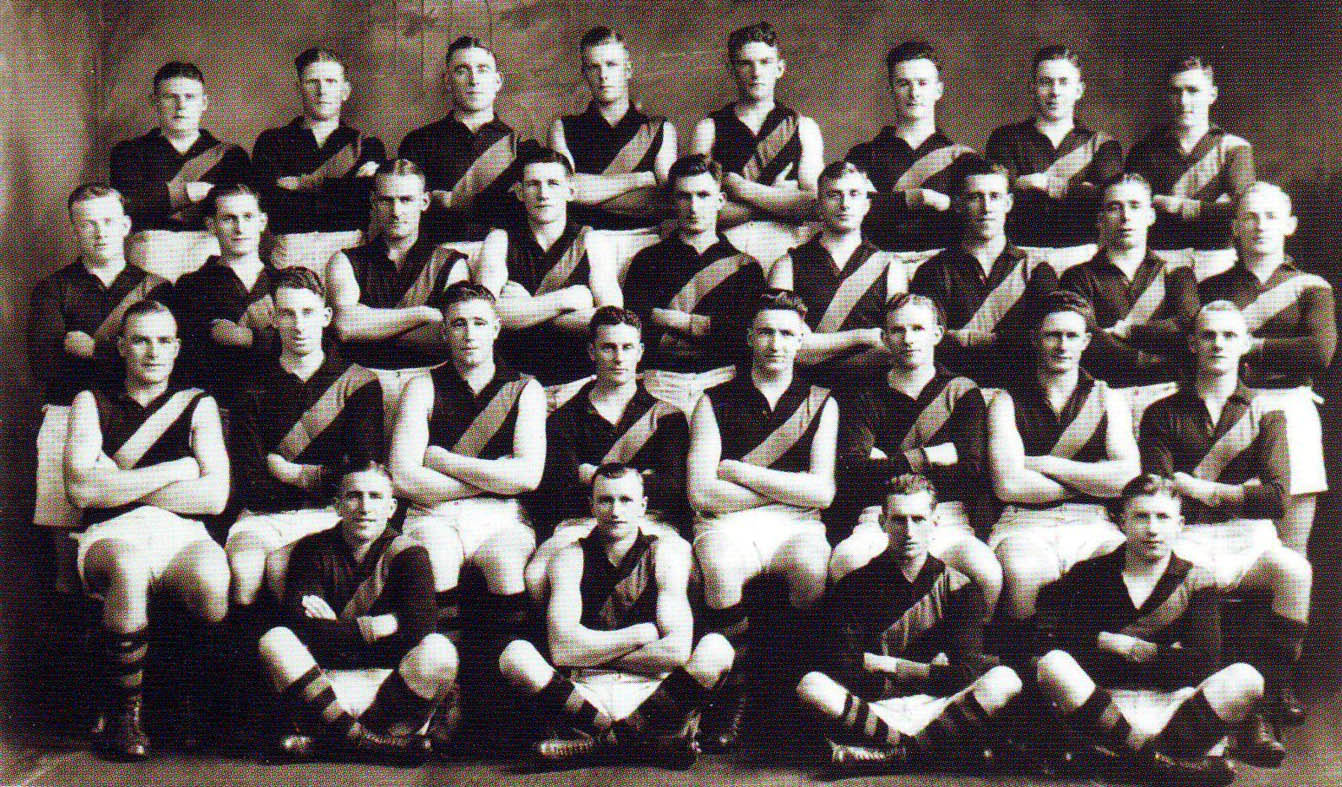
Richmond FC team, premiers

Richmond:

- Titus 6
- Harris 3
- O'Halloran 3
- Bentley 2
- Martin 2
- Baxter 1
- Murdoch 1
- Zschech 1

South Melbourne:

- Nash 6
- Pratt 2
- Bertram 1
- Brain 1
- Diggins 1
- O'Meara 1

== See also ==
- 1934 VFL season
