= 1933 VFL grand final =

Grand final of the 1933 Victorian Football League season

1933 VFL Grand Final

South Melbourne	Richmond
9.17 (71)	4.5 (29)
	1	2	3	4
SM	3.5 (23)	6.7 (43)	8.12 (60)	9.17 (71)
RIC	0.2 (2)	2.3 (15)	3.3 (21)	4.5 (29)
- Date: 30 September 1933
- Stadium: Melbourne Cricket Ground
- Attendance: 75,754
- Umpires: Bob Scott

The 1933 VFL grand final was an Australian rules football game contested between the Richmond Football Club and South Melbourne Football Club, held at the Melbourne Cricket Ground in Melbourne on 30 September 1933. It was the 35th annual grand final of the Victorian Football League, staged to determine the premiers for the 1933 VFL season. The match, attended by 75,754 spectators, was won by South Melbourne by a margin of 42 points, marking that club's third premiership victory.

As of 2023, Richmond's total of 4.5 (29) remains the lowest score conceded by South Melbourne since 1919.

Bob Pratt kicked three goals for South Melbourne which saw him overtake Gordon Coventry as the 1933 season's leading goalkicker.

South Melbourne's premiership side was often referred to as the "foreign legion" due to the high number of players in the team who had been recruited from interstate. The majority of their recruits around that time came from Western Australia which earned South Melbourne the nickname "Swans".

This was the first of two successive years in which these teams met in the premiership decider. In the 1934 VFL Grand Final it was Richmond which emerged victorious. South Melbourne did not win another premiership for 72 years, eventually winning the 2005 AFL Grand Final — as the "Sydney Swans" — having relocated to Sydney in 1982.

== Teams ==
S. Melbourne	Richmond

South Melbourne
B:	Jock McKenzie	Hec McKay	Jack Austin
HB:	Bill Faul	Laurie Nash	Hugh McLaughlin
C:	Harry Clarke	Len Thomas	John Bowe
HF:	Joe O'Meara	Brighton Diggins	Peter Reville
F:	Herbie Matthews	Bob Pratt	Ossie Bertram
Foll:	Jack Bisset (c)	Dinny Kelleher	Terry Brain
Res:	Bert Beard		
Coach:	Jack Bisset		

Richmond
B:	Martin Bolger	Maurie Sheahan	Kevin O'Neill
HB:	Jack Stenhouse	Joe Murdoch	Basil McCormack
C:	Stan Judkins	Eric Zschech	Allan Geddes
HF:	Horrie Farmer	Thomas O'Halloran	Jack Baggott
F:	Jack Dyer	Jack Titus	Bert Foster
Foll:	Percy Bentley (c)	Gordon Strang	Ray Martin
Res:	Jack Anderson		
Coach:	Billy Schmidt		

- Umpire – Bob Scott

== Statistics ==
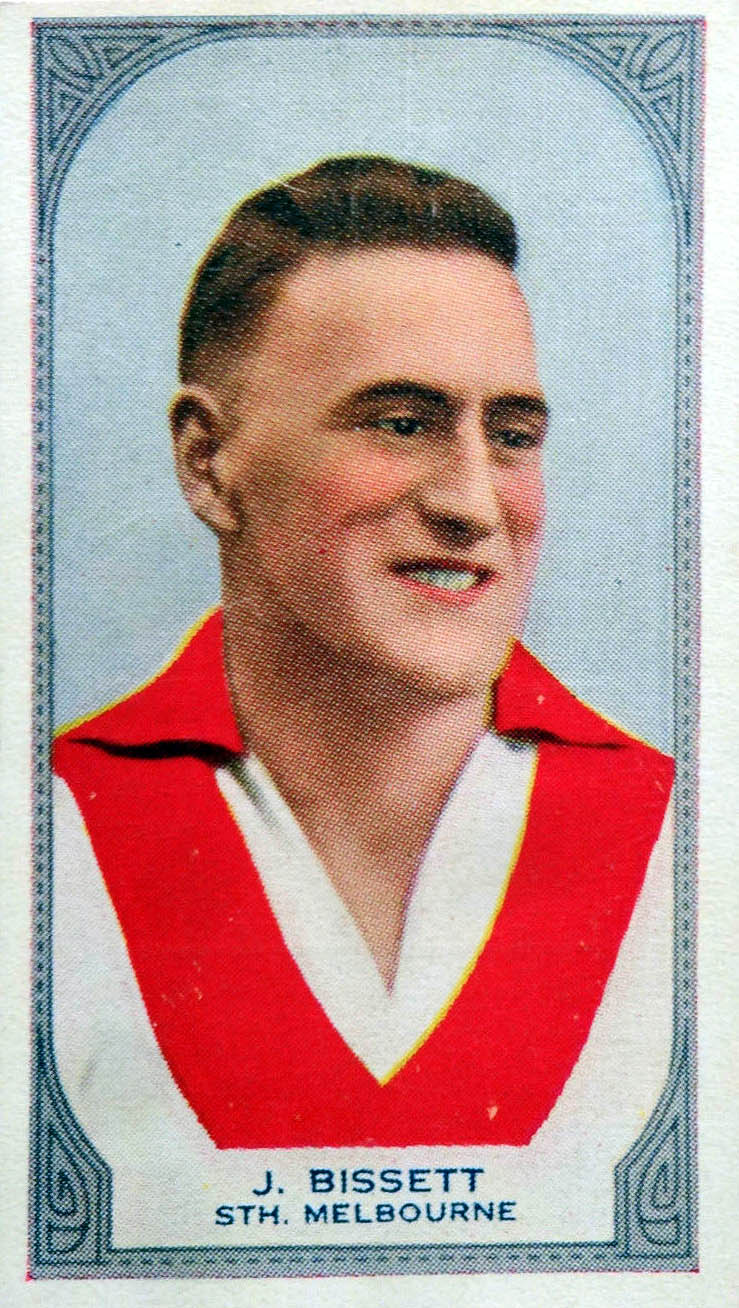
South Melbourne captain and coach, Jack Bisset

=== Score ===
Team	1	2	3	4	Total
South Melbourne	3.5	6.7	8.12	9.17	9.17 (71)
Richmond	0.2	2.3	3.3	4.5	4.5 (29)

=== Goal kickers ===
South Melbourne:

- Pratt 3
- Brain 2
- Diggins 2
- Reville 1
- Thomas 1

Richmond:

- Farmer 2
- Martin 1
- Strang 1

== See also ==
- 1933 VFL season
