= Hugh McLaughlin =

Hugh McLaughlin may refer to:

- Hugh McLaughlin (publisher) (1918–2006), Irish publisher and inventor
- Hugh McLaughlin Sr. (1909–1977), Australian rules footballer for South Melbourne and Footscray
- Hugh McLaughlin Jr. (1935–2004), Australian rules footballer for South Melbourne
- Hugh McLaughlin (politician) (1827–1904), American politician
- Hugh McLaughlin (footballer, born 1943), Scottish footballer for Brentford
- Hugh McLaughlin (footballer, born 1945) (died 2020), Scottish footballer for St Mirren
- Hugh J. McLaughlin (politician) (1915–2014), American politician
