= 2016 AFL season =

120th season of the Australian Football League (AFL)

2016 AFL premiership season
- Teams: 18
- Premiers: Western Bulldogs; 2nd premiership
- Minor premiers: Sydney; 9th minor premiership
- Brownlow Medallist: Patrick Dangerfield; Geelong (35 votes)
- Coleman Medallist: Josh Kennedy; West Coast (80 goals)

Attendance
- Matches played: 207
- Total attendance: 6,870,241 (33,190 per match)
- Highest (H&A): 85,082 (round 5, Collingwood v Essendon)
- Highest (finals): 99,981 (Grand Final, Sydney vs. Western Bulldogs)

The 2016 AFL season was the 120th season of the Australian Football League (AFL), the highest level senior Australian rules football competition in Australia, which was known as the Victorian Football League until 1989.

The season featured eighteen clubs, ran from 24 March until 1 October, and comprised a 22-game home-and-away season followed by a finals series featuring the top eight clubs. Thirty-four players, seventeen of whom were still active in the league, missed the season through suspension by the World Anti-Doping Agency, for doping infringements which occurred at the Essendon Football Club as part of its 2012 sports supplements program.

The premiership was won by the Western Bulldogs for the second time, after it defeated Sydney by 22 points in the 2016 AFL Grand Final.

== Pre-season ==
The pre-season series of matches, known as the 2016 NAB Challenge, featured 27 practice matches played over 25 days, which began on 18 February and ended on 13 March. The matches were stand-alone, with no overall winner of the series. Each team played three games, many of which were played at suburban or regional venues, with all games televised on Fox Footy. The nine-point super goal was used in these matches.

	Week 1
Thursday, 18 February (7:10 pm)	Hawthorn 0.8.5 (53)	def.	Carlton 0.4.8 (32)	Aurora Stadium (crowd: 9,181)	Report
Friday, 19 February (4:10 pm)	Fremantle 0.14.6 (90)	def.	Richmond 0.4.6 (30)	Rushton Park (crowd: 7,500)	Report
Saturday, 20 February (2:05 pm)	St Kilda 1.9.10 (73)	def. by	North Melbourne 0.18.9 (117)	Norm Minns Oval, Wangaratta (crowd: 6,216)	Report
Saturday, 20 February (4:40 pm)	Sydney 1.10.12 (81)	def.	Port Adelaide 1.7.9 (60)	Blacktown International Sportspark (crowd: 3,172)	Report
Sunday, 21 February (1:35 pm)	Adelaide 2.20.10 (148)	def.	West Coast 0.7.6 (48)	Unley Oval, Adelaide (crowd: 8,000)	Report
Sunday, 21 February (3:40 pm)	Brisbane Lions 0.6.7 (43)	def. by	Gold Coast 0.9.14 (68)	Moreton Bay Central Sports Complex, Burpengary (crowd: 3,807)	Report

	Week 2
Thursday, 25 February (7:10 pm)	Greater Western Sydney 0.11.7 (73)	def. by	Western Bulldogs 1.13.17 (104)	StarTrack Oval (crowd: 5,472)	Report
Friday, 26 February (7:10 pm)	Geelong 2.16.9 (123)	def. by	Collingwood 0.21.5 (131)	Simonds Stadium (crowd: 20,460)	Report
Saturday, 27 February (1:35 pm)	Port Adelaide 1.10.7 (76)	def. by	Melbourne 0.15.5 (95)	Playford Alive Oval, Adelaide (crowd: 4,981)	Report
Saturday, 27 February (4:40 pm)	Richmond 1.15.5 (104)	def.	Hawthorn 0.4.9 (33)	Holm Park, (crowd: 6,384)	Report
Sunday, 28 February (2:05 pm)	Carlton 1.3.8 (35)	def. by	Essendon 1.13.8 (95)	Ikon Park (crowd: 18,718)	Report
Sunday, 28 February (1:40 pm)	Fremantle 1.9.6 (69)	def.	Adelaide 0.8.19 (67)	Sounness Park, Mount Barker (crowd: 4,767)	Report

	Week 3
Thursday, 3 March (4:10 pm)	West Coast 0.7.13 (55)	def.	Gold Coast 1.6.7 (52)	HBF Arena, Joondalup (crowd: 5,021)	Report
Friday, 4 March (7:10 pm)	Sydney 1.8.3 (60)	def. by	Greater Western Sydney 0.14.10 (94)	Drummoyne Oval, Sydney (crowd: 4,754)	Report
Saturday, 5 March (2:05 pm)	Essendon 0.3.6 (24)	def. by	Geelong 0.17.9 (111)	Deakin Reserve, Shepparton (crowd: 5,488)	Report
Saturday, 5 March (4:40 pm)	North Melbourne 1.10.8 (77)	def. by	Collingwood 0.12.13 (85)	Robertson Oval, Wagga Wagga (crowd: 6,000)	Report
Sunday, 6 March (2:05 pm)	Western Bulldogs 1.7.9 (60)	def. by	Melbourne 0.10.12 (72)	Highgate Recreational Reserve, Craigieburn (crowd: 4,139)	Report
Sunday, 6 March (cancelled)	Brisbane Lions	v	St Kilda	Harrup Park Country Club, Mackay

	Week 4
Thursday, 10 March (7:10 pm)	Richmond 1.4.12 (45)	def. by	Port Adelaide 0.13.15 (93)	Etihad Stadium (crowd: 6,584)	Report
Friday, 11 March (5:50 pm)	Carlton 1.8.12 (69)	def. by	Sydney 0.14.7 (91)	Etihad Stadium (crowd: 6,804)	Report
Friday, 11 March (7:40 pm)	Gold Coast 0.11.18 (84)	def. by	Adelaide 3.12.10 (109)	Metricon Stadium (crowd: 4,460)	Report
Saturday, 12 March (1:10 pm)	Collingwood 1.15.8 (107)	def.	Western Bulldogs 1.14.12 (105)	Etihad Stadium (crowd: 12,594)	Report
Saturday, 12 March (1:10 pm)	Fremantle 2.9.11 (83)	def.	Geelong 0.10.11 (71)	Domain Stadium (crowd: 8,624)	Report
Saturday, 12 March (7:10 pm)	Hawthorn 2.16.11 (125)	def.	North Melbourne 0.12.8 (80)	Etihad Stadium (crowd: 8,894)	Report
Sunday, 13 March (12:10 pm)	Brisbane Lions 2.9.11 (83)	def. by	Greater Western Sydney 1.17.11 (122)	Metricon Stadium (crowd: 1,504)	Report
Sunday, 13 March (4:10 pm)	Melbourne 1.14.14 (107)	def.	St Kilda 0.12.11 (83)	Etihad Stadium (crowd: 8,621)	Report
Sunday, 13 March (4:10 pm)	West Coast 1.23.11 (158)	def.	Essendon 0.7.11 (53)	Domain Stadium (crowd: 9,210)	Report

== Rule changes ==
The following rule changes were made for the 2016 season:

- The interchange rules were significantly altered to give each team four interchange players and a maximum of 90 rotations per game (excluding concussion, blood rule and stretcher interchanges). This replaced the 2015 protocol in which teams had three interchange players and a substitute and a maximum of 120 rotations per game.
- The scope of tackles covered by the existing 'dangerous tackles' rule was expanded, with both umpires and the tribunal more strictly penalising players for tackles including a lifting, slinging or rotating technique.
- A stricter interpretation of the existing "deliberate out of bounds" rule is to be applied.
- The width of the protected zone on either side of a player with a mark or free kick was increased from five metres to ten metres. The rule was trialled in the 2016 pre-season before being endorsed shortly for the premiership season.
- A provision for the AFL to appeal to the tribunal against an inadequate penalty will be introduced; previously, players had the right to appeal their charges or penalties but the AFL did not have the right to appeal against an acquittal or lenient penalty.
- A thirty-second countdown clock, within which a player taking a set shot must begin their approach, was displayed on the scoreboard at most AFL grounds. This replaced the previous system in which the umpire was responsible for judging the thirty second time limit. The change was not implemented at grounds which lacked existing infrastructure to support it. From round 9 onwards, the shot clock was not shown during the final two minutes of any quarter to prevent it from being actively used in end-of-game clock management.
- The grand final replay was abolished, with the provisions which were introduced in 1991 for five minutes each way of extra time in drawn finals now also applying to a drawn grand final. A new provision was also introduced to all finals to allow for an untimed period of golden point extra time to decide the game if scores remained level after extra time.
- All matches during rounds 13, 14 and 15 (the bye rounds) featured a trial of officiating matches with four field umpires instead of three.

== Premiership season ==
Notable features of the draw include:

- Due to the weighted rule, Collingwood and Essendon met only once in the regular season for the first time since 1991, on Anzac Day.
- Due to poor results in the Friday night timeslot in 2015, Carlton did not feature on Friday nights during the regular season, but still contested the annual Thursday night season opener against Richmond in round 1.
- Melbourne and Richmond again met on Anzac Eve, which this season fell on a Sunday night. It was the only Sunday night match for the season, with the timeslot's unpopularity causing it to be scrapped after the 2014 season. The New Zealand Anzac Day match was scrapped from the fixture.
- Due to the Sydney Royal Easter Show, Greater Western Sydney's primary home ground (Spotless Stadium) was unavailable until round 6, therefore the club's first two home games were played at its secondary home ground, Manuka Oval.
- One month prior to the season, the Sydney Swans and ANZ Stadium came to an agreement to end their contract one year earlier than its scheduled conclusion, resulting in all eleven Sydney home games being played at the Sydney Cricket Ground, instead of eight at the SCG and three at ANZ Stadium. ANZ Stadium was still used for finals matches during 2016.
- The inclusion of the first ever AFL sanctioned LGBT pride game for premiership points was held in round 21 between St Kilda and Sydney.
- There was a bye round between round 23 and the first week of the finals, to encourage teams participating in the finals to field their strongest side possible ahead of their first final. It was since announced in February 2016 that the annual E. J. Whitten Legends Game would be played in the football-free weekend, shifting from its mid-season slot.
- All starting times are local.

=== Round 1 ===
	Round 1 (Opening Round)
Thursday, 24 March (7:25 pm)	Richmond 14.8 (92)	def.	Carlton 12.11 (83)	MCG (crowd: 75,706)	Report
Saturday, 26 March (1:40 pm)	Melbourne 12.8 (80)	def.	Greater Western Sydney 10.18 (78)	MCG (crowd: 28,505)	Report
Saturday, 26 March (3:35 pm)	Gold Coast 17.19 (121)	def.	Essendon 9.6 (60)	Metricon Stadium (crowd: 16,239)	Report
Saturday, 26 March (7:25 pm)	Sydney 18.25 (133)	def.	Collingwood 7.11 (53)	SCG (crowd: 33,857) (Moved from ANZ Stadium)	Report
Saturday, 26 March (7:25 pm)	North Melbourne 16.11 (107)	def.	Adelaide 14.13 (97)	Etihad Stadium (crowd: 25,485)	Report
Sunday, 27 March (1:10 pm)	Western Bulldogs 15.13 (103)	def.	Fremantle 5.8 (38)	Etihad Stadium (crowd: 27,832)	Report
Sunday, 27 March (2:50 pm)	Port Adelaide 20.13 (133)	def.	St Kilda 15.10 (100)	Adelaide Oval (crowd: 43,807)	Report
Sunday, 27 March (4:40 pm)	West Coast 26.10 (166)	def.	Brisbane Lions 15.12 (102)	Domain Stadium (crowd: 35,201)	Report
Monday, 28 March (3:20 pm)	Geelong 18.8 (116)	def.	Hawthorn 12.14 (86)	MCG (crowd: 74,218)	Report
Fremantle's score of 5.8 (38) is its lowest ever score against the Western Bulldogs.

=== Round 2 ===
	Round 2
Friday, 1 April (7:50 pm)	Collingwood 13.9 (87)	def.	Richmond 12.14 (86)	MCG (crowd: 72,761)	Report
Saturday, 2 April (1:15 pm)	Adelaide 22.12 (144)	def.	Port Adelaide 11.20 (86)	Adelaide Oval (crowd: 51,585)	Report
Saturday, 2 April (2:10 pm)	Essendon 11.14 (80)	def.	Melbourne 10.7 (67)	MCG (crowd: 50,424)	Report
Saturday, 2 April (3:35 pm)	Brisbane Lions 11.17 (83)	def. by	North Melbourne 17.15 (117)	Gabba (crowd: 18,021)	Report
Saturday, 2 April (7:25 pm)	St Kilda 5.6 (36)	def. by	Western Bulldogs 13.15 (93)	Etihad Stadium (crowd: 37,353)	Report
Saturday, 2 April (4:40 pm)	Fremantle 14.16 (100)	def. by	Gold Coast 19.12 (126)	Domain Stadium (crowd: 34,208)	Report
Sunday, 3 April (1:10 pm)	Greater Western Sydney 13.11 (89)	def.	Geelong 11.10 (76)	Manuka Oval (crowd: 13,656)	Report
Sunday, 3 April (3:20 pm)	Hawthorn 14.15 (99)	def.	West Coast 7.11 (53)	MCG (crowd: 42,977)	Report
Sunday, 3 April (4:40 pm)	Carlton 10.11 (71)	def. by	Sydney 20.11 (131)	Etihad Stadium (crowd: 33,146)	Report

=== Round 3 ===
	Round 3
Friday, 8 April (7:50 pm)	Port Adelaide 17.10 (112)	def.	Essendon 7.9 (51)	Adelaide Oval (crowd: 44,601)	Report
Saturday, 9 April (1:45 pm)	St Kilda 18.11 (119)	def.	Collingwood 14.6 (90)	MCG (crowd: 50,903)	Report
Saturday, 9 April (2:10 pm)	Richmond 13.14 (92)	def. by	Adelaide 19.14 (128)	Etihad Stadium (crowd: 29,951)	Report
Saturday, 9 April (4:35 pm)	Sydney 14.9 (93)	def.	Greater Western Sydney 10.8 (68)	SCG (crowd: 37,045)	Report
Saturday, 9 April (7:25 pm)	Gold Coast 13.17 (95)	def.	Carlton 5.11 (41)	Metricon Stadium (crowd: 13,885)	Report
Saturday, 9 April (5:40 pm)	West Coast 12.20 (92)	def.	Fremantle 8.11 (59)	Domain Stadium (crowd: 40,555)	Report
Sunday, 10 April (1:10 pm)	North Melbourne 21.10 (136)	def.	Melbourne 20.11 (131)	Blundstone Arena (crowd: 12,607)	Report
Sunday, 10 April (3:20 pm)	Western Bulldogs 13.12 (90)	def. by	Hawthorn 14.9 (93)	Etihad Stadium (crowd: 46,808)	Report
Sunday, 10 April (4:40 pm)	Geelong 18.17 (125)	def.	Brisbane Lions 7.14 (56)	Simonds Stadium (crowd: 23,320)	Report

=== Round 4 ===
	Round 4
Friday, 15 April (6:10 pm)	West Coast 18.17 (125)	def.	Richmond 9.3 (57)	Domain Stadium (crowd: 38,860)	Report
Saturday, 16 April (1:45 pm)	Essendon 6.6 (42)	def. by	Geelong 9.18 (72)	MCG (crowd: 42,723)	Report
Saturday, 16 April (2:10 pm)	Hawthorn 13.9 (87)	def.	St Kilda 13.6 (84)	Aurora Stadium (crowd: 15,173)	Report
Saturday, 16 April (4:35 pm)	Brisbane Lions 14.23 (107)	def.	Gold Coast 14.10 (94)	Gabba (crowd: 20,041)	Report
Saturday, 16 April (7:25 pm)	Carlton 7.7 (49)	def. by	Western Bulldogs 13.7 (85)	Etihad Stadium (crowd: 27,622)	Report
Saturday, 16 April (7:10 pm)	Adelaide 16.17 (113)	def.	Sydney 15.13 (103)	Adelaide Oval (crowd: 51,330)	Report
Sunday, 17 April (1:10 pm)	Greater Western Sydney 22.19 (151)	def.	Port Adelaide 9.11 (65)	Manuka Oval (crowd: 10,028)	Report
Sunday, 17 April (3:20 pm)	Collingwood 9.13 (67)	def. by	Melbourne 16.6 (102)	MCG (crowd: 47,558)	Report
Sunday, 17 April (4:40 pm)	North Melbourne 20.12 (132)	def.	Fremantle 14.17 (101)	Etihad Stadium (crowd: 23,393)	Report
Greater Western Sydney's score of 22.19 (151) is the biggest score kicked at Manuka Oval.

=== Round 5 ===
	Round 5 (ANZAC Round)
Friday, 22 April (7:50 pm)	Hawthorn 17.10 (112)	def.	Adelaide 17.7 (109)	MCG (crowd: 45,781)	Report
Saturday, 23 April (1:45 pm)	Sydney 12.16 (88)	def.	West Coast 7.7 (49)	SCG (crowd: 35,427)	Report
Saturday, 23 April (4:35 pm)	Gold Coast 11.15 (81)	def. by	North Melbourne 18.11 (119)	Metricon Stadium (crowd: 13,351)	Report
Saturday, 23 April (7:25 pm)	Western Bulldogs 17.18 (120)	def.	Brisbane Lions 10.7 (67)	Etihad Stadium (crowd: 25,097)	Report
Saturday, 23 April (7:15 pm)	Port Adelaide 8.11 (59)	def. by	Geelong 16.11 (107)	Adelaide Oval (crowd: 44,937)	Report
Sunday, 24 April (1:10 pm)	St Kilda 12.7 (79)	def. by	Greater Western Sydney 19.12 (126)	Etihad Stadium (crowd: 21,052)	Report
Sunday, 24 April (2:15 pm)	Fremantle 9.14 (68)	def. by	Carlton 10.12 (72)	Domain Stadium (crowd: 34,796)	Report
Sunday, 24 April (7:10 pm)	Melbourne 20.9 (129)	def.	Richmond 14.12 (96)	MCG (crowd: 59,968)	Report
Monday, 25 April (3:20 pm)	Collingwood 22.10 (142)	def.	Essendon 11.7 (73)	MCG (crowd: 85,082)	Report

=== Round 6 ===
	Round 6
Friday, 29 April (7:50 pm)	North Melbourne 9.7 (61)	def.	Western Bulldogs 6.9 (45)	Etihad Stadium (crowd: 47,622)	Report
Saturday, 30 April (1:45 pm)	Melbourne 15.6 (96)	def. by	St Kilda 20.15 (135)	Etihad Stadium (crowd: 27,260)	Report
Saturday, 30 April (1:40 pm)	Adelaide 14.13 (97)	def.	Fremantle 8.16 (64)	Adelaide Oval (crowd: 47,423)	Report
Saturday, 30 April (4:35 pm)	Greater Western Sydney 24.14 (158)	def.	Hawthorn 12.11 (83)	Spotless Stadium (crowd: 13,766)	Report
Saturday, 30 April (7:25 pm)	Geelong 25.18 (168)	def.	Gold Coast 7.6 (48)	Simonds Stadium (crowd: 23,007)	Report
Saturday, 30 April (7:25 pm)	Richmond 8.11 (59)	def. by	Port Adelaide 13.16 (94)	MCG (crowd: 27,077)	Report
Sunday, 1 May (1:10 pm)	Brisbane Lions 14.10 (94)	def. by	Sydney 15.7 (97)	Gabba (crowd: 14,646)	Report
Sunday, 1 May (3:20 pm)	Carlton 10.12 (72)	def.	Essendon 8.9 (57)	MCG (crowd: 43,827)	Report
Sunday, 1 May (2:40 pm)	West Coast 18.16 (124)	def.	Collingwood 9.8 (62)	Domain Stadium (crowd: 37,931)	Report

=== Round 7 ===
	Round 7
Friday, 6 May (7:50 pm)	Richmond 13.12 (90)	def. by	Hawthorn 21.10 (136)	MCG (crowd: 49,678)	Report
Saturday, 7 May (1:45 pm)	Collingwood 12.12 (84)	def. by	Carlton 15.9 (99)	MCG (crowd: 60,222)	Report
Saturday, 7 May (2:10 pm)	Geelong 18.15 (123)	def.	West Coast 12.7 (79)	Simonds Stadium (crowd: 25,429)	Report
Saturday, 7 May (4:35 pm)	Sydney 20.15 (135)	def.	Essendon 7.12 (54)	SCG (crowd: 29,527) (Moved from ANZ Stadium)	Report
Saturday, 7 May (5:10 pm)	Gold Coast 14.3 (87)	def. by	Melbourne 24.16 (160)	Metricon Stadium (crowd: 12,780)	Report
Saturday, 7 May (7:25 pm)	Western Bulldogs 18.15 (123)	def.	Adelaide 17.6 (108)	Etihad Stadium (crowd: 26,984)	Report
Saturday, 7 May (6:10 pm)	Fremantle 11.11 (77)	def. by	Greater Western Sydney 14.11 (95)	Domain Stadium (crowd: 28,201)	Report
Sunday, 8 May (3:20 pm)	St Kilda 11.9 (75)	def. by	North Melbourne 11.16 (82)	Etihad Stadium (crowd: 27,254)	Report
Sunday, 8 May (4:10 pm)	Port Adelaide 21.10 (136)	def.	Brisbane Lions 7.17 (59)	Adelaide Oval (crowd: 32,399)	Report
Melbourne's score of 24.16 (160) was its highest score since round 6, 2004 and the highest score conceded by Gold Coast at Metricon Stadium.

=== Round 8 ===
	Round 8
Friday, 13 May (7:20 pm)	Adelaide 11.6 (72)	def. by	Geelong 13.20 (98)	Adelaide Oval (crowd: 53,141)	Report
Saturday, 14 May (1:45 pm)	Essendon 8.12 (60)	def. by	North Melbourne 10.14 (74)	Etihad Stadium (crowd: 30,321)	Report
Saturday, 14 May (2:10 pm)	Hawthorn 17.14 (116)	def.	Fremantle 11.9 (75)	Aurora Stadium (crowd: 12,012)	Report
Saturday, 14 May (4:35 pm)	Greater Western Sydney 22.17 (149)	def.	Gold Coast 9.4 (58)	Spotless Stadium (crowd: 8,308)	Report
Saturday, 14 May (7:25 pm)	Richmond 14.17 (101)	def.	Sydney 15.10 (100)	MCG (crowd: 36,014)	Report
Saturday, 14 May (7:25 pm)	Brisbane Lions 10.5 (65)	def. by	Collingwood 20.23 (143)	Gabba (crowd: 24,552)	Report
Sunday, 15 May (1:10 pm)	Carlton 14.9 (93)	def.	Port Adelaide 13.13 (91)	Etihad Stadium (crowd: 26,924)	Report
Sunday, 15 May (3:20 pm)	Melbourne 12.10 (82)	def. by	Western Bulldogs 17.12 (114)	MCG (crowd: 39,921)	Report
Sunday, 15 May (2:40 pm)	West Coast 20.12 (132)	def.	St Kilda 3.11 (29)	Domain Stadium (crowd: 36,140)	Report
Essendon's half-time score of 0.4 (4) against North Melbourne is its lowest half-time score since round 1, 1915.; Richmond defeated Sydney after Sam Lloyd kicked a goal after the final siren.; St Kilda's score of 3.11 (29) is its lowest ever score at Domain Stadium and its equal lowest score against West Coast. It is also St Kilda's lowest score in any game since round 6, 2002.; West Coast's winning margin of 103 points is their biggest win against St Kilda.

=== Round 9 ===
	Round 9
Friday, 20 May (7:50 pm)	Hawthorn 7.13 (55)	def. by	Sydney 10.9 (69)	MCG (crowd: 61,552)	Report
Saturday, 21 May (1:45 pm)	Collingwood 16.8 (104)	def.	Geelong 11.14 (80)	MCG (crowd: 59,864)	Report
Saturday, 21 May (2:10 pm)	Gold Coast 11.8 (74)	def. by	Adelaide 22.17 (149)	Metricon Stadium (crowd: 11,692)	Report
Saturday, 21 May (4:05 pm)	Port Adelaide 13.8 (86)	def. by	West Coast 14.10 (94)	Adelaide Oval (crowd: 38,695)	Report
Saturday, 21 May (5:40 pm)	Fremantle 6.9 (45)	def. by	Richmond 11.17 (83)	Domain Stadium (crowd: 20,184)	Report
Saturday, 21 May (7:25 pm)	North Melbourne 17.11 (113)	def.	Carlton 6.10 (46)	Etihad Stadium (crowd: 38,419)	Report
Sunday, 22 May (1:10 pm)	Melbourne 19.17 (131)	def.	Brisbane Lions 9.14 (68)	MCG (crowd: 26,892)	Report
Sunday, 22 May (3:20 pm)	Greater Western Sydney 15.8 (98)	def.	Western Bulldogs 10.13 (73)	Spotless Stadium (crowd: 9,612)	Report
Sunday, 22 May (4:40 pm)	St Kilda 16.13 (109)	def.	Essendon 9.9 (63)	Etihad Stadium (crowd: 29,026)	Report
North Melbourne won the first nine games of a VFL/AFL season for the first time in its history.; The Fremantle vs Richmond game, played during torrential rain, was attended by only 20,184 people, the lowest for a Fremantle home game since round 8, 2001, despite selling a season-high 43,943 tickets.

=== Round 10 ===
	Round 10 (Sir Doug Nicholls Round)
Friday, 27 May (7:50 pm)	Sydney 14.7 (91)	def.	North Melbourne 9.11 (65)	SCG (crowd: 38,498)	Report
Saturday, 28 May (1:45 pm)	Brisbane Lions 13.9 (87)	def. by	Hawthorn 21.9 (135)	Gabba (crowd: 23,691)	Report
Saturday, 28 May (1:40 pm)	Melbourne 10.16 (76)	def. by	Port Adelaide 18.13 (121)	TIO Traeger Park (crowd: 5,146)	Report
Saturday, 28 May (4:35 pm)	St Kilda 15.11 (101)	def.	Fremantle 10.7 (67)	Etihad Stadium (crowd: 17,927)	Report
Saturday, 28 May (7:25 pm)	Essendon 10.7 (67)	def. by	Richmond 16.9 (105)	MCG (crowd: 56,948)	Report
Saturday, 28 May (7:10 pm)	Adelaide 15.17 (107)	def.	Greater Western Sydney 13.7 (85)	Adelaide Oval (crowd: 46,737)	Report
Sunday, 29 May (1:10 pm)	Carlton 16.8 (104)	def.	Geelong 12.13 (85)	Etihad Stadium (crowd: 33,535)	Report
Sunday, 29 May (3:20 pm)	Collingwood 7.11 (53)	def. by	Western Bulldogs 11.8 (74)	MCG (crowd: 45,078)	Report
Sunday, 29 May (2:40 pm)	West Coast 20.12 (132)	def.	Gold Coast 7.13 (55)	Domain Stadium (crowd: 34,945)	Report
Carlton defeated Geelong for the first time at Etihad Stadium after 15 attempts.

=== Round 11 ===
	Round 11
Friday, 3 June (7:50 pm)	North Melbourne 18.16 (124)	def.	Richmond 7.12 (54)	Blundstone Arena (crowd: 17,844)	Report
Saturday, 4 June (1:45 pm)	Hawthorn 11.16 (82)	def.	Melbourne 10.4 (64)	MCG (crowd: 41,833)	Report
Saturday, 4 June (2:10 pm)	Carlton 16.6 (102)	def.	Brisbane Lions 9.10 (64)	Etihad Stadium (crowd: 30,722)	Report
Saturday, 4 June (4:35 pm)	Geelong 14.14 (98)	def.	Greater Western Sydney 14.4 (88)	Simonds Stadium (crowd: 22,007)	Report
Saturday, 4 June (5:40 pm)	Fremantle 20.6 (126)	def.	Essendon 6.11 (47)	Domain Stadium (crowd: 31,199)	Report
Saturday, 4 June (7:25 pm)	Gold Coast 6.5 (41)	def. by	Sydney 11.13 (79)	Metricon Stadium (crowd: 4,368)	Report
Sunday, 5 June (1:10 pm)	Collingwood 7.16 (58)	def. by	Port Adelaide 19.11 (125)	MCG (crowd: 28,567)	Report
Sunday, 5 June (3:20 pm)	Western Bulldogs 12.11 (83)	def.	West Coast 11.9 (75)	Etihad Stadium (crowd: 28,769)	Report
Sunday, 5 June (4:10 pm)	Adelaide 19.19 (133)	def.	St Kilda 6.9 (45)	Adelaide Oval (crowd: 40,896)	Report
The match between North Melbourne and Richmond at Blundstone Arena saw a crowd of 17,844, the highest for an AFL game at the ground.; Three clubs laid a club record number of tackles in their round 11 matches: Sydney (135 tackles), Gold Coast (119 tackles) and Hawthorn (109 tackles); all occurred in wet conditions, which is usually conducive to higher tackle counts. The Swans' record was broken just two rounds later.; As stand-in captain in the Western Bulldogs' win over West Coast, Marcus Bontempelli became the youngest player in history to captain a VFL/AFL side to victory at the age of 20 years and 194 days.

=== Round 12 ===
	Round 12
Friday, 10 June (7:50 pm)	Essendon 6.7 (43)	def. by	Hawthorn 23.13 (151)	Etihad Stadium (crowd: 27,567)	Report
Saturday, 11 June (1:10 pm)	Port Adelaide 14.13 (97)	def. by	Western Bulldogs 15.10 (100)	Adelaide Oval (crowd: 40,096)	Report
Saturday, 11 June (4:35 pm)	Brisbane Lions 9.10 (64)	def. by	Fremantle 23.9 (147)	Gabba (crowd: 12,899)	Report
Saturday, 11 June (7:25 pm)	Geelong 15.15 (105)	def.	North Melbourne 12.2 (74)	Etihad Stadium (crowd: 44,045)	Report
Saturday, 11 June (5:40 pm)	West Coast 11.10 (76)	def. by	Adelaide 15.15 (105)	Domain Stadium (crowd: 37,591)	Report
Sunday, 12 June (1:10 pm)	St Kilda 17.8 (110)	def.	Carlton 12.6 (78)	Etihad Stadium (crowd: 47,945)	Report
Sunday, 12 June (3:20 pm)	Richmond 17.12 (114)	def.	Gold Coast 15.7 (97)	MCG (crowd: 30,448)	Report
Sunday, 12 June (4:40 pm)	Greater Western Sydney 15.15 (105)	def.	Sydney 9.9 (63)	Spotless Stadium (crowd: 21,541)	Report
Monday, 13 June (3:20 pm)	Melbourne 16.8 (104)	def.	Collingwood 8.10 (58)	MCG (crowd: 60,158)	Report
Patrick Dangerfield's disposal count of 48 is the equal highest amount of disposals ever by a single player in Geelong's history and the equal highest number of disposals for any player at Etihad Stadium.; West Coast had its only scoreless quarter in its history at Domain Stadium.; Melbourne ended an eight game winless streak against Collingwood in the Queen's Birthday clash.

=== Round 13 ===
	Round 13
Friday, 17 June (7:50 pm)	North Melbourne 11.18 (84)	def. by	Hawthorn 14.9 (93)	Etihad Stadium (crowd: 37,073)	Report
Saturday, 18 June (1:40 pm)	Brisbane Lions 12.10 (82)	def. by	West Coast 20.11 (131)	Gabba (crowd: 12,777)	Report
Saturday, 18 June (2:35 pm)	Fremantle 12.14 (86)	def.	Port Adelaide 9.15 (69)	Domain Stadium (crowd: 32,448)	Report
Saturday, 18 June (7:25 pm)	Western Bulldogs 5.13 (43)	def. by	Geelong 16.4 (100)	Etihad Stadium (crowd: 41,725)	Report
Sunday, 19 June (1:10 pm)	Sydney 12.14 (86)	def.	Melbourne 4.7 (31)	SCG (crowd: 19,086)	Report
Sunday, 19 June (4:40 pm)	Essendon 12.18 (90)	def. by	Greater Western Sydney 17.15 (117)	Etihad Stadium (crowd: 14,463)	Report
	Bye; Adelaide, Carlton, Collingwood, Gold Coast, Richmond, St Kilda
The Sydney Swans laid the most number of tackles ever recorded in a match, with 155 in its win over Melbourne in a match played in wet conditions.; The crowd of 14,463 for the match between Essendon and Greater Western Sydney is the lowest for an Essendon home game since 1991.

=== Round 14 ===
	Round 14
Thursday, 23 June (7:20 pm)	Adelaide 12.28 (100)	def.	North Melbourne 10.7 (67)	Adelaide Oval (crowd: 37,890)	Report
Friday, 24 June (7:50 pm)	Collingwood 12.13 (85)	def.	Fremantle 5.7 (37)	MCG (crowd: 20,320)	Report
Saturday, 25 June (1:40 pm)	Richmond 17.15 (117)	def.	Brisbane Lions 11.9 (75)	MCG (crowd: 28,883)	Report
Saturday, 25 June (4:35 pm)	Greater Western Sydney 18.19 (127)	def.	Carlton 9.11 (65)	Spotless Stadium (crowd: 10,355)	Report
Saturday, 25 June (7:25 pm)	St Kilda 14.9 (93)	def.	Geelong 13.12 (90)	Etihad Stadium (crowd: 28,745)	Report
Sunday, 26 June (3:20 pm)	Hawthorn 12.14 (86)	def.	Gold Coast 8.12 (60)	Aurora Stadium (crowd: 10,121)	Report
	Bye; Essendon, Melbourne, Port Adelaide, Sydney, West Coast, Western Bulldogs
The crowd of 20,320 for the match between Collingwood and Fremantle, played in cold conditions, is the lowest for a game involving Collingwood at the MCG since 1940.; Collingwood's win against Fremantle was their 1500th win in their VFL/AFL history.; Fremantle's score of 5.7 (37) is its lowest score against Collingwood and their lowest score at the MCG.; This round was the lowest attended round by average crowds since round 19, 1996, and the lowest attended round overall since round 6, 1994.

=== Round 15 ===
	Round 15
Thursday, 30 June (6:10 pm)	West Coast 20.10 (130)	def.	Essendon 7.10 (52)	Domain Stadium (crowd: 33,117)	Report
Friday, 1 July (7:50 pm)	Port Adelaide 14.10 (94)	def.	Richmond 8.8 (56)	Adelaide Oval (crowd: 37,848)	Report
Saturday, 2 July (1:40 pm)	Gold Coast 15.18 (108)	def.	St Kilda 8.20 (68)	Metricon Stadium (crowd: 14,071)	Report
Saturday, 2 July (4:35 pm)	Sydney 11.13 (79)	def. by	Western Bulldogs 13.5 (83)	SCG (crowd: 33,386)	Report
Saturday, 2 July (7:25 pm)	Carlton 6.9 (45)	def. by	Collingwood 8.9 (57)	MCG (crowd: 56,157)	Report
Sunday, 3 July (3:20 pm)	Melbourne 15.8 (98)	def. by	Adelaide 18.12 (120)	MCG (crowd: 29,133)	Report
	Bye; Brisbane Lions, Fremantle, Geelong, Greater Western Sydney, Hawthorn, North Melbourne

=== Round 16 ===
	Round 16 (Multicultural Round)
Thursday, 7 July (7:20 pm)	Port Adelaide 12.7 (79)	def. by	Hawthorn 15.11 (101)	Adelaide Oval (crowd: 43,025)	Report
Friday, 8 July (7:50 pm)	Geelong 9.6 (60)	def. by	Sydney 15.8 (98)	Simonds Stadium (crowd: 24,339)	Report
Saturday, 9 July (1:40 pm)	Greater Western Sydney 14.9 (93)	def. by	Collingwood 19.11 (125)	Spotless Stadium (crowd: 13,483)	Report
Saturday, 9 July (4:35 pm)	Gold Coast 22.7 (139)	def.	Brisbane Lions 17.11 (113)	Metricon Stadium (crowd: 13,528)	Report
Saturday, 9 July (7:25 pm)	Western Bulldogs 12.13 (85)	def.	Richmond 11.9 (75)	Etihad Stadium (crowd: 39,679)	Report
Saturday, 9 July (7:10 pm)	Melbourne 12.15 (87)	def.	Fremantle 8.7 (55)	TIO Stadium (crowd: 8,163)	Report
Sunday, 10 July (1:10 pm)	Carlton 7.5 (47)	def. by	Adelaide 16.11 (107)	MCG (crowd: 32,430)	Report
Sunday, 10 July (1:20 pm)	West Coast 16.8 (104)	def.	North Melbourne 11.6 (72)	Domain Stadium (crowd: 35,168)	Report
Sunday, 10 July (4:40 pm)	Essendon 14.14 (98)	def. by	St Kilda 17.7 (109)	Etihad Stadium (crowd: 25,204)	Report

=== Round 17 ===
	Round 17
Thursday, 14 July (7:20 pm)	Sydney 10.10 (70)	def. by	Hawthorn 11.9 (75)	SCG (crowd: 42,314)	Report
Friday, 15 July (6:10 pm)	Fremantle 9.7 (61)	def. by	Geelong 11.12 (78)	Domain Stadium (crowd: 31,042)	Report
Saturday, 16 July (1:40 pm)	Richmond 16.6 (102)	def.	Essendon 11.17 (83)	MCG (crowd: 44,908)	Report
Saturday, 16 July (4:35 pm)	North Melbourne 10.17 (77)	def. by	Port Adelaide 16.9 (105)	Etihad Stadium (crowd: 24,361)	Report
Saturday, 16 July (7:25 pm)	Western Bulldogs 15.17 (107)	def.	Gold Coast 8.11 (59)	Cazaly's Stadium (crowd: 8,509)	Report
Saturday, 16 July (7:10 pm)	Adelaide 14.13 (97)	def.	Collingwood 10.9 (69)	Adelaide Oval (crowd: 50,012)	Report
Sunday, 17 July (1:10 pm)	Carlton 11.9 (75)	def. by	West Coast 12.10 (82)	MCG (crowd: 26,389)	Report
Sunday, 17 July (3:20 pm)	St Kilda 15.20 (110)	def.	Melbourne 11.8 (74)	Etihad Stadium (crowd: 25,322)	Report
Sunday, 17 July (4:40 pm)	Brisbane Lions 9.13 (67)	def. by	Greater Western Sydney 22.14 (146)	Gabba (crowd: 10,195)	Report
Greater Western Sydney's second quarter score of 10.1 (61) was their highest scoring quarter ever.; The Brisbane Lions lost a club record 12th consecutive match.; The crowd of 10,195 for the match between the Brisbane Lions and Greater Western Sydney is the lowest for a Brisbane Lions match at the Gabba and the lowest at the ground since round 16, 1995.; St Kilda won its 14th consecutive game against Melbourne spanning from the 2006 elimination final, and recorded their longest winning streak against any club in their VFL/AFL history, surpassing their previous record of 13 consecutive wins against Fitzroy from 1962 to 1969.

=== Round 18 ===
	Round 18
Friday, 22 July (7:50 pm)	Collingwood 12.12 (84)	def. by	North Melbourne 18.16 (124)	Etihad Stadium (crowd: 36,041)	Report
Saturday, 23 July (1:45 pm)	Sydney 10.14 (74)	def.	Carlton 10.8 (68)	SCG (crowd: 31,765) (Moved from ANZ Stadium)	Report
Saturday, 23 July (2:10 pm)	Gold Coast 16.9 (105)	def.	Fremantle 12.9 (81)	Metricon Stadium (crowd: 8,933)	Report
Saturday, 23 July (2:35 pm)	West Coast 10.6 (66)	def.	Melbourne 8.12 (60)	Domain Stadium (crowd: 33,908)	Report
Saturday, 23 July (7:25 pm)	Geelong 12.13 (85)	def.	Adelaide 7.13 (55)	Simonds Stadium (crowd: 21,127)	Report
Saturday, 23 July (7:25 pm)	Western Bulldogs 9.6 (60)	def. by	St Kilda 11.9 (75)	Etihad Stadium (crowd: 26,532)	Report
Sunday, 24 July (1:10 pm)	Essendon 12.19 (91)	def. by	Brisbane Lions 20.8 (128)	Etihad Stadium (crowd: 34,869)	Report
Sunday, 24 July (3:20 pm)	Hawthorn 16.18 (114)	def.	Richmond 5.14 (44)	MCG (crowd: 51,892)	Report
Sunday, 24 July (4:10 pm)	Port Adelaide 9.6 (60)	def. by	Greater Western Sydney 11.13 (79)	Adelaide Oval (crowd: 27,935)	Report

=== Round 19 ===
	Round 19
Friday, 29 July (7:50 pm)	Geelong 16.7 (103)	def.	Western Bulldogs 11.12 (78)	Simonds Stadium (crowd: 24,331)	Report
Saturday, 30 July (1:45 pm)	Greater Western Sydney 17.9 (111)	def.	Richmond 3.5 (23)	Manuka Oval (crowd: 14,974)	Report
Saturday, 30 July (2:10 pm)	Hawthorn 10.14 (74)	def.	Carlton 7.13 (55)	Aurora Stadium (crowd: 18,112)	Report
Saturday, 30 July (4:35 pm)	Collingwood 13.13 (91)	def.	West Coast 11.6 (72)	MCG (crowd: 34,929)	Report
Saturday, 30 July (7:25 pm)	North Melbourne 12.13 (85)	def.	St Kilda 8.14 (62)	Etihad Stadium (crowd: 44,287)	Report
Saturday, 30 July (7:25 pm)	Brisbane Lions 11.13 (79)	def. by	Port Adelaide 25.23 (173)	Gabba (crowd: 13,085)	Report
Sunday, 31 July (1:10 pm)	Melbourne 9.12 (66)	def.	Gold Coast 9.10 (64)	MCG (crowd: 20,627)	Report
Sunday, 31 July (1:20 pm)	Fremantle 7.5 (47)	def. by	Sydney 21.11 (137)	Domain Stadium (crowd: 32,401)	Report
Sunday, 31 July (4:10 pm)	Adelaide 22.11 (143)	def.	Essendon 9.7 (61)	Adelaide Oval (crowd: 44,264)	Report
Corey Enright played his 326th game and became the games record holder for Geelong.; The crowd of 14,974 for Greater Western Sydney vs. Richmond is the highest ever crowd at Manuka Oval for an AFL game.; Richmond's score of 3.5 (23) is the lowest score kicked at Manuka Oval, the lowest score kicked against Greater Western Sydney.; Greater Western Sydney's winning margin of 88 is the biggest winning margin at Manuka Oval.; Brent Harvey of North Melbourne became the VFL/AFL games record holder after surpassing Michael Tuck's previous record of 426 games.; Port Adelaide's score of 25.23 (173) is the highest score the Brisbane Lions has conceded at the Gabba.; Port Adelaide's score of 25.23 (173) and their winning margin of 94 is their highest score and greatest winning margin outside of South Australia.; The crowd of 44,287 for North Melbourne vs St Kilda is the highest ever for a home and away game between these two clubs.

=== Round 20 ===
	Round 20
Friday, 5 August (7:50 pm)	Richmond 14.8 (92)	def.	Collingwood 11.11 (77)	MCG (crowd: 49,122)	Report
Saturday, 6 August (1:45 pm)	Sydney 14.16 (100)	def.	Port Adelaide 4.9 (33)	SCG (crowd: 30,204)	Report
Saturday, 6 August (2:10 pm)	Melbourne 17.8 (110)	def.	Hawthorn 11.15 (81)	MCG (crowd: 38,818)	Report
Saturday, 6 August (4:35 pm)	Gold Coast 13.6 (84)	def. by	Greater Western Sydney 14.8 (92)	Metricon Stadium (crowd: 9,108)	Report
Saturday, 6 August (7:25 pm)	Western Bulldogs 9.7 (61)	def.	North Melbourne 7.5 (47)	Etihad Stadium (crowd: 30,740)	Report
Saturday, 6 August (7:10 pm)	Adelaide 27.15 (177)	def.	Brisbane Lions 6.3 (39)	Adelaide Oval (crowd: 43,549)	Report
Sunday, 7 August (1:10 pm)	Carlton 7.9 (51)	def. by	St Kilda 19.8 (122)	MCG (crowd: 37,797)	Report
Sunday, 7 August (3:20 pm)	Geelong 15.10 (100)	def.	Essendon 4.10 (34)	Etihad Stadium (crowd: 29,254)	Report
Sunday, 7 August (2:40 pm)	Fremantle 9.10 (64)	def. by	West Coast 17.8 (110)	Domain Stadium (crowd: 36,215)	Report
Port Adelaide's score of 4.9 (33) is their lowest against Sydney and their lowest score at the SCG.; Melbourne defeated Hawthorn for the first time since round 8, 2006, ending a thirteen match losing streak.; Adelaide's score of 27.15 (177) is the highest AFL score at Adelaide Oval and both their biggest score and win against the Brisbane Lions.; Essendon's score of 4.10 (34) is their lowest score at Etihad Stadium.

=== Round 21 ===
	Round 21
Friday, 12 August (7:50 pm)	Western Bulldogs 14.11 (95)	def.	Collingwood 14.8 (92)	Etihad Stadium (crowd: 35,010)	Report
Saturday, 13 August (1:45 pm)	Brisbane Lions 15.9 (99)	def.	Carlton 13.17 (95)	Gabba (crowd: 17,432)	Report
Saturday, 13 August (2:10 pm)	Hawthorn 14.12 (96)	def.	North Melbourne 8.9 (57)	MCG (crowd: 50,657)	Report
Saturday, 13 August (4:35 pm)	Greater Western Sydney 14.12 (96)	def. by	West Coast 14.13 (97)	Spotless Stadium (crowd: 10,385)	Report
Saturday, 13 August (7:25 pm)	St Kilda 11.10 (76)	def. by	Sydney 23.8 (146)	Etihad Stadium (crowd: 33,059)	Report
Saturday, 13 August (7:10 pm)	Port Adelaide 8.6 (54)	def. by	Melbourne 13.16 (94)	Adelaide Oval (crowd: 33,426)	Report
Sunday, 14 August (1:10 pm)	Essendon 11.9 (75)	def.	Gold Coast 9.15 (69)	Etihad Stadium (crowd: 16,622)	Report
Sunday, 14 August (3:20 pm)	Richmond 12.6 (78)	def. by	Geelong 10.22 (82)	MCG (crowd: 45,567)	Report
Sunday, 14 August (2:40 pm)	Fremantle 11.4 (70)	def. by	Adelaide 21.16 (142)	Domain Stadium (crowd: 30,116)	Report
Melbourne defeated Port Adelaide in South Australia for the first time since round 8, 2000, ending an eleven match losing streak.; Essendon broke a club record 17-match losing streak with their win over Gold Coast.

=== Round 22 ===
	Round 22
Friday, 19 August (6:10 pm)	West Coast 13.14 (92)	def.	Hawthorn 10.7 (67)	Domain Stadium (crowd: 38,581)	Report
Saturday, 20 August (1:45 pm)	North Melbourne 10.16 (76)	def. by	Sydney 12.13 (85)	Blundstone Arena (crowd: 16,495)	Report
Saturday, 20 August (2:10 pm)	Richmond 6.10 (46)	def. by	St Kilda 7.13 (55)	MCG (crowd: 35,255)	Report
Saturday, 20 August (4:35 pm)	Greater Western Sydney 19.15 (129)	def.	Fremantle 5.7 (37)	Spotless Stadium (crowd: 9,556)	Report
Saturday, 20 August (7:25 pm)	Collingwood 16.22 (118)	def.	Gold Coast 6.11 (47)	Etihad Stadium (crowd: 17,644)	Report
Saturday, 20 August (7:10 pm)	Port Adelaide 14.10 (94)	def. by	Adelaide 15.19 (109)	Adelaide Oval (crowd: 49,541)	Report
Sunday, 21 August (1:10 pm)	Carlton 11.12 (78)	def.	Melbourne 7.16 (58)	MCG (crowd: 40,693)	Report
Sunday, 21 August (3:20 pm)	Brisbane Lions 10.9 (69)	def. by	Geelong 19.15 (129)	Gabba (crowd: 20,477)	Report
Sunday, 21 August (4:40 pm)	Essendon 7.11 (53)	def. by	Western Bulldogs 14.9 (93)	Etihad Stadium (crowd: 25,308)	Report
The crowd of 17,644 for the match between Collingwood and Gold Coast at Etihad Stadium is the lowest for a Collingwood home game since round 21, 1989.

=== Round 23 ===
	Round 23
Friday, 26 August (7:40 pm)	Adelaide 10.11 (71)	def. by	West Coast 14.16 (100)	Adelaide Oval (crowd: 50,785)	Report
Saturday, 27 August (1:45 pm)	Geelong 24.11 (155)	def.	Melbourne 6.8 (44)	Simonds Stadium (crowd: 24,413)	Report
Saturday, 27 August (2:10 pm)	Essendon 15.13 (103)	def.	Carlton 10.19 (79)	MCG (crowd: 46,566)	Report
Saturday, 27 August (4:35 pm)	Sydney 25.14 (164)	def.	Richmond 7.9 (51)	SCG (crowd: 36,570)	Report
Saturday, 27 August (7:25 pm)	North Melbourne 9.9 (63)	def. by	Greater Western Sydney 14.16 (100)	Etihad Stadium (crowd: 22,295)	Report
Saturday, 27 August (7:25 pm)	Gold Coast 9.12 (66)	def. by	Port Adelaide 13.11 (89)	Metricon Stadium (crowd: 9,213)	Report
Sunday, 28 August (1:10 pm)	St Kilda 25.11 (161)	def.	Brisbane Lions 15.13 (103)	Etihad Stadium (crowd: 21,834)	Report
Sunday, 28 August (3:20 pm)	Hawthorn 17.10 (112)	def.	Collingwood 17.9 (111)	MCG (crowd: 52,968)	Report
Sunday, 28 August (2:40 pm)	Fremantle 10.9 (69)	def.	Western Bulldogs 6.13 (49)	Domain Stadium (crowd: 34,765)	Report

== Win/loss table ==
Team	1	2	3	4	5	6	7	8	9	10	11	12	13	14	15	16	17	18	19	20	21	22	23	F1	F2	F3	GF	Ladder
Adelaide	NM; 10	**PA**; **58**	Rich; 36	**Syd**; **10**	Haw; 3	**Frem**; **33**	WB; 15	**Geel**; **26**	GCS; 75	**GWS**; **22**	**StK**; **88**	WCE; 29	X	**NM**; **33**	Melb; 22	Carl; 60	**Coll**; **28**	Geel; 30	**Ess**; **82**	**BL**; **138**	Frem; 72	PA; 15	**WCE**; **29**	**NM**; **62**	Syd; 36	X	X	**5**
Brisbane Lions	WCE; 64	**NM**; **34**	Geel; 69	**GCS**; **13**	WB; 53	**Syd**; **3**	PA; 77	**Coll**; **78**	Melb; 63	**Haw**; **48**	Carl; 38	**Frem**; **83**	**WCE**; **49**	Rich; 42	X	GCS; 26	**GWS**; **79**	Ess; 37	**PA**; **94**	Adel; 138	**Carl**; **4**	**Geel**; **60**	StK; 58	X	X	X	X	17
Carlton	Rich; 9	**Syd**; **60**	GCS; 54	**WB**; **36**	Frem; 4	**Ess**; **15**	Coll; 15	**PA**; **2**	NM; 67	**Geel**; **19**	**BL**; **38**	StK; 32	X	GWS; 62	**Coll**; **12**	**Adel**; **60**	**WCE**; **7**	Syd; 6	Haw; 19	**StK**; **71**	BL; 4	**Melb**; **20**	Ess; 24	X	X	X	X	14
Collingwood	Syd; 80	**Rich**; **1**	StK; 29	**Melb**; **35**	**Ess**; **69**	WCE; 62	**Carl**; **15**	BL; 78	**Geel**; **24**	**WB**; **21**	**PA**; **67**	Melb; 46	X	**Frem**; **48**	Carl; 12	GWS; 32	Adel; 28	**NM**; **40**	**WCE**; **19**	Rich; 15	WB; 3	**GCS**; **71**	Haw; 1	X	X	X	X	12
Essendon	GCS; 61	**Melb**; **13**	PA; 61	**Geel**; **30**	Coll; 69	Carl; 15	Syd; 81	**NM**; **14**	StK; 46	**Rich**; **38**	Frem; 79	**Haw**; **108**	**GWS**; **27**	X	WCE; 78	**StK**; **11**	Rich; 19	**BL**; **37**	Adel; 82	Geel; 66	**GCS**; **6**	**WB**; **40**	**Carl**; **24**	X	X	X	X	18
Fremantle	WB; 65	**GCS**; **26**	WCE; 33	NM; 31	**Carl**; **4**	Adel; 33	**GWS**; **18**	Haw; 41	**Rich**; **38**	StK; 34	**Ess**; **79**	BL; 83	**PA**; **17**	Coll; 48	X	Melb; 32	**Geel**; **17**	GCS; 24	**Syd**; **90**	**WCE**; **46**	**Adel**; **72**	GWS; 92	**WB**; **20**	X	X	X	X	16
Geelong	**Haw**; **30**	GWS; 13	**BL**; **69**	Ess; 30	PA; 48	**GCS**; **120**	**WCE**; **44**	Adel; 26	Coll; 24	Carl; 19	**GWS**; **10**	**NM**; **31**	WB; 57	StK; 3	X	**Syd**; **38**	Frem; 17	**Adel**; **30**	**WB**; **25**	**Ess**; **66**	Rich; 4	BL; 60	**Melb**; **111**	**Haw**; **2**	X	**Syd**; **37**	X	**2**
Gold Coast	**Ess**; **61**	Frem; 26	**Carl**; **54**	BL; 13	**NM**; **38**	Geel; 120	**Melb**; **73**	GWS; 91	**Adel**; **75**	WCE; 77	**Syd**; **38**	Rich; 17	X	Haw; 26	**StK**; **40**	**BL**; **26**	WB; 48	**Frem**; **24**	Melb; 2	**GWS**; **8**	Ess; 6	Coll; 71	**PA**; **23**	X	X	X	X	15
Greater Western Sydney	Melb; 2	**Geel**; **13**	Syd; 25	**PA**; **86**	StK; 47	**Haw**; **75**	Frem; 18	**GCS**; **91**	**WB**; **25**	Adel; 22	Geel; 10	**Syd**; **42**	Ess; 27	**Carl**; **62**	X	**Coll**; **32**	BL; 79	PA; 19	**Rich**; **88**	GCS; 8	**WCE**; **1**	**Frem**; **92**	NM; 37	Syd; 36	X	**WB**; **6**	X	**4**
Hawthorn	Geel; 30	**WCE**; **46**	WB; 3	**StK**; **3**	**Adel**; **3**	GWS; 75	Rich; 46	**Frem**; **41**	**Syd**; **14**	BL; 48	**Melb**; **18**	Ess; 108	NM; 9	**GCS**; **26**	X	PA; 22	Syd; 5	**Rich**; **70**	**Carl**; **19**	Melb; 29	**NM**; **39**	WCE; 25	**Coll**; **1**	Geel; 2	**WB**; **23**	X	X	**3**
Melbourne	**GWS**; **2**	Ess; 13	NM; 5	Coll; 35	**Rich**; **33**	**StK**; **39**	GCS; 73	**WB**; **32**	**BL**; **63**	**PA**; **45**	Haw; 18	**Coll**; **46**	Syd; 55	X	**Adel**; **22**	**Frem**; **32**	StK; 36	WCE; 6	**GCS**; **2**	**Haw**; **29**	PA; 40	Carl; 20	Geel; 111	X	X	X	X	11
North Melbourne	**Adel**; **10**	BL; 34	**Melb**; **5**	**Frem**; **31**	GCS; 38	**WB**; **16**	StK; 7	Ess; 14	**Carl**; **67**	Syd; 26	**Rich**; **70**	Geel; 31	**Haw**; **9**	Adel; 33	X	WCE; 32	**PA**; **28**	Coll; 40	**StK**; **23**	WB; 14	Haw; 39	**Syd**; **9**	**GWS**; **37**	Adel; 62	X	X	X	**8**
Port Adelaide	**StK**; **33**	Adel; 58	**Ess**; **61**	GWS; 86	**Geel**; **48**	Rich; 35	**BL**; **77**	Carl; 2	**WCE**; **8**	Melb; 45	Coll; 67	**WB**; **3**	Frem; 17	X	**Rich**; **38**	**Haw**; **22**	NM; 28	**GWS**; **19**	BL; 94	Syd; 67	**Melb**; **40**	**Adel**; **15**	GCS; 23	X	X	X	X	10
Richmond	**Carl**; **9**	Coll; 1	**Adel**; **36**	WCE; 68	Melb; 33	**PA**; **35**	**Haw**; **46**	**Syd**; **1**	Frem; 38	Ess; 38	NM; 70	**GCS**; **17**	X	**BL**; **42**	PA; 38	WB; 10	**Ess**; **19**	Haw; 70	GWS; 88	**Coll**; **15**	**Geel**; **4**	**StK**; **9**	Syd; 113	X	X	X	X	13
St Kilda	PA; 33	**WB**; **57**	**Coll**; **29**	Haw; 3	**GWS**; **47**	Melb; 39	**NM**; **7**	WCE; 103	**Ess**; **46**	**Frem**; **34**	Adel; 88	**Carl**; **32**	X	**Geel**; **3**	GCS; 40	Ess; 11	**Melb**; **36**	WB; 15	NM; 23	Carl; 71	**Syd**; **70**	Rich; 9	**BL**; **58**	X	X	X	X	9
Sydney	**Coll**; **80**	Carl; 60	**GWS**; **25**	Adel; 10	**WCE**; **39**	BL; 3	**Ess**; **81**	Rich; 1	Haw; 14	**NM**; **26**	GCS; 38	GWS; 42	**Melb**; **55**	X	**WB**; **4**	Geel; 38	**Haw**; **5**	**Carl**; **6**	Frem; 90	**PA**; **67**	StK; 70	NM; 9	**Rich**; **113**	**GWS**; **36**	**Adel**; **36**	Geel; 37	**WB**; **22**	**1**
West Coast	**BL**; **64**	Haw; 46	**Frem**; **33**	**Rich**; **68**	Syd; 39	**Coll**; **62**	Geel; 44	**StK**; **103**	PA; 8	**GCS**; **77**	WB; 8	**Adel**; **29**	BL; 49	X	**Ess**; **78**	**NM**; **32**	Carl; 7	**Melb**; **6**	Coll; 19	Frem; 46	GWS; 1	**Haw**; **25**	Adel; 29	**WB**; **47**	X	X	X	**6**
Western Bulldogs	**Frem**; **65**	StK; 57	**Haw**; **3**	Carl; 36	**BL**; **53**	NM; 16	**Adel**; **15**	Melb; 32	GWS; 25	Coll; 21	**WCE**; **8**	PA; 3	**Geel**; **57**	X	Syd; 4	**Rich**; **10**	**GCS**; **48**	**StK**; **15**	Geel; 25	**NM**; **14**	**Coll**; **3**	Ess; 40	Frem; 20	WCE; 47	Haw; 23	GWS; 6	Syd; 22	**7 (P)**
Team	1	2	3	4	5	6	7	8	9	10	11	12	13	14	15	16	17	18	19	20	21	22	23	F1	F2	F3	GF	Ladder

+	Win	Qualified for finals
−	Loss	Eliminated

Bold – Home game
X – Bye
Opponent for round listed above margin

== Ladder ==
Pos	Team	Pld	W	L	D	PF	PA	PP	Pts	Qualification
1	Sydney	22	17	5	0	2221	1469	151.2	68	2016 finals
2	Geelong	22	17	5	0	2235	1554	143.8	68	2016 finals
3	Hawthorn	22	17	5	0	2134	1800	118.6	68	2016 finals
4	Greater Western Sydney	22	16	6	0	2380	1663	143.1	64	2016 finals
5	Adelaide	22	16	6	0	2483	1795	138.3	64	2016 finals
6	West Coast	22	16	6	0	2181	1678	130.0	64	2016 finals
7	Western Bulldogs (P)	22	15	7	0	1857	1609	115.4	60	2016 finals
8	North Melbourne	22	12	10	0	1956	1859	105.2	48	2016 finals
9	St Kilda	22	12	10	0	1953	2041	95.7	48	
10	Port Adelaide	22	10	12	0	2055	1939	106.0	40	
11	Melbourne	22	10	12	0	1944	1991	97.6	40	
12	Collingwood	22	9	13	0	1910	1998	95.6	36	
13	Richmond	22	8	14	0	1713	2155	79.5	32	
14	Carlton	22	7	15	0	1568	1978	79.3	28	
15	Gold Coast	22	6	16	0	1778	2273	78.2	24	
16	Fremantle	22	4	18	0	1574	2119	74.3	16	
17	Brisbane Lions	22	3	19	0	1770	2872	61.6	12	
18	Essendon	22	3	19	0	1437	2356	61.0	12	

Source: AFL
Rules for classification: 1) points; 2) percentage; 3) number of points for.
(P) Premiers

=== Ladder progression ===
- Numbers highlighted in green indicates the team finished the round inside the top 8.
- Numbers highlighted in blue indicates the team finished in first place on the ladder in that round.
- Numbers highlighted in red indicates the team finished in last place on the ladder in that round.
- Underlined numbers indicates the team did not play during that round, either due to a bye or a postponed game.
- Subscript numbers indicate ladder position at round's end.

Points by round
Team ╲ Round	1	2	3	4	5	6	7	8	9	10	11	12	13	14	15	16	17	18	19	20	21	22	23
Sydney	4_{2}	8_{2}	12_{1}	12_{3}	16_{3}	20_{3}	24_{3}	24_{4}	28_{4}	32_{2}	36_{2}	36_{3}	40_{2}	40_{2}	40_{4}	44_{2}	44_{5}	48_{3}	52_{3}	56_{2}	60_{2}	64_{1}	68_{1}
Geelong	4_{5}	4_{6}	8_{5}	12_{4}	16_{4}	20_{2}	24_{2}	28_{2}	28_{2}	28_{3}	32_{3}	36_{2}	40_{1}	40_{3}	40_{2}	40_{6}	44_{7}	48_{4}	52_{4}	56_{5}	60_{4}	64_{3}	68_{2}
Hawthorn	0_{14}	4_{7}	8_{9}	12_{8}	16_{5}	16_{8}	20_{6}	24_{6}	24_{7}	28_{7}	32_{5}	36_{5}	40_{4}	44_{1}	44_{1}	48_{1}	52_{1}	56_{1}	60_{1}	60_{1}	64_{1}	64_{4}	68_{3}
Greater Western Sydney	0_{10}	4_{9}	4_{11}	8_{9}	12_{6}	16_{5}	20_{5}	24_{3}	28_{3}	28_{4}	28_{6}	32_{6}	36_{5}	40_{4}	40_{3}	40_{7}	44_{4}	48_{2}	52_{2}	56_{4}	56_{5}	60_{5}	64_{4}
Adelaide	0_{11}	4_{5}	8_{6}	12_{7}	12_{9}	16_{7}	16_{8}	16_{8}	20_{8}	24_{8}	28_{8}	32_{7}	32_{8}	36_{8}	40_{5}	44_{3}	48_{2}	48_{6}	52_{5}	56_{3}	60_{3}	64_{2}	64_{5}
West Coast	4_{4}	4_{8}	8_{7}	12_{6}	12_{8}	16_{6}	16_{7}	20_{7}	24_{6}	28_{5}	28_{7}	28_{8}	32_{7}	32_{8}	36_{8}	40_{5}	44_{6}	48_{5}	48_{6}	52_{6}	56_{6}	60_{6}	64_{6}
Western Bulldogs	4_{1}	8_{1}	8_{4}	12_{2}	16_{2}	16_{4}	20_{4}	24_{5}	24_{5}	28_{6}	32_{4}	36_{4}	36_{6}	36_{7}	40_{6}	44_{4}	48_{3}	48_{7}	48_{7}	52_{7}	56_{7}	60_{7}	60_{7}
North Melbourne	4_{8}	8_{4}	12_{3}	16_{1}	20_{1}	24_{1}	28_{1}	32_{1}	36_{1}	36_{1}	40_{1}	40_{1}	40_{3}	40_{5}	40_{7}	40_{8}	40_{8}	44_{8}	48_{8}	48_{8}	48_{8}	48_{8}	48_{8}
St Kilda	0_{13}	0_{18}	4_{13}	4_{12}	4_{13}	8_{12}	8_{13}	8_{14}	12_{13}	16_{13}	16_{13}	20_{12}	20_{12}	24_{12}	24_{13}	28_{12}	32_{10}	36_{9}	36_{10}	40_{9}	40_{10}	44_{9}	48_{9}
Port Adelaide	4_{6}	4_{12}	8_{8}	8_{11}	8_{12}	12_{11}	16_{10}	16_{10}	16_{10}	20_{10}	24_{9}	24_{9}	24_{9}	24_{9}	28_{9}	28_{9}	32_{9}	32_{10}	36_{9}	36_{10}	36_{11}	36_{11}	40_{10}
Melbourne	4_{9}	4_{11}	4_{10}	8_{10}	12_{10}	12_{9}	16_{9}	16_{9}	20_{9}	20_{9}	20_{11}	24_{10}	24_{10}	24_{10}	24_{10}	28_{10}	28_{11}	28_{11}	32_{11}	36_{11}	40_{9}	40_{10}	40_{11}
Collingwood	0_{17}	4_{14}	4_{14}	4_{15}	8_{11}	8_{13}	8_{14}	12_{12}	16_{11}	16_{12}	16_{12}	16_{14}	16_{14}	20_{14}	24_{11}	28_{11}	28_{12}	28_{12}	32_{12}	32_{12}	32_{12}	36_{12}	36_{12}
Richmond	4_{7}	4_{10}	4_{12}	4_{13}	4_{14}	4_{15}	4_{15}	8_{15}	12_{14}	16_{14}	16_{14}	20_{13}	20_{13}	24_{11}	24_{12}	24_{13}	28_{13}	28_{13}	28_{13}	32_{13}	32_{13}	32_{13}	32_{13}
Carlton	0_{12}	0_{15}	0_{17}	0_{18}	4_{15}	8_{14}	12_{12}	16_{11}	16_{12}	20_{11}	24_{10}	24_{11}	24_{11}	24_{13}	24_{14}	24_{14}	24_{14}	24_{14}	24_{15}	24_{15}	24_{15}	28_{14}	28_{14}
Gold Coast	4_{3}	8_{3}	12_{2}	12_{5}	12_{7}	12_{10}	12_{11}	12_{13}	12_{15}	12_{15}	12_{15}	12_{15}	12_{16}	12_{16}	16_{15}	20_{15}	20_{15}	24_{15}	24_{14}	24_{14}	24_{14}	24_{15}	24_{15}
Fremantle	0_{18}	0_{17}	0_{16}	0_{17}	0_{18}	0_{18}	0_{18}	0_{18}	0_{18}	0_{18}	4_{16}	8_{16}	12_{15}	12_{15}	12_{16}	12_{16}	12_{16}	12_{16}	12_{16}	12_{16}	12_{16}	12_{16}	16_{16}
Brisbane Lions	0_{15}	0_{16}	0_{18}	4_{14}	4_{16}	4_{16}	4_{16}	4_{16}	4_{16}	4_{16}	4_{17}	4_{17}	4_{17}	4_{17}	4_{17}	4_{17}	4_{17}	8_{17}	8_{17}	8_{17}	12_{17}	12_{17}	12_{17}
Essendon	0_{16}	4_{13}	4_{15}	4_{16}	4_{17}	4_{17}	4_{17}	4_{17}	4_{17}	4_{17}	4_{18}	4_{18}	4_{18}	4_{18}	4_{18}	4_{18}	4_{18}	4_{18}	4_{18}	4_{18}	8_{18}	8_{18}	12_{18}

Source: AFL Tables

=== Positions of teams round by round ===
View source data.

== Finals series ==
Qualifying and elimination finals
10 Sep, ANZ Stadium
1	Sydney	7.13 (55)
4	Greater Western Sydney	12.19 (91)
10 Sep, Adelaide Oval
5	Adelaide	21.15 (141)
8	North Melbourne	12.7 (79)
8 Sep, Domain Stadium
6	West Coast	7.10 (52)
7	Western Bulldogs	14.15 (99)
9 Sep, MCG
2	Geelong	12.13 (85)
3	Hawthorn	12.11 (83)

Semi-finals
17 Sep, SCG
Sydney	18.10 (118)
Adelaide	12.10 (82)
16 Sep, MCG
Hawthorn	12.12 (84)
Western Bulldogs	16.11 (107)

Preliminary finals
24 Sep, Spotless Stadium
Greater Western Sydney	12.11 (83)
Western Bulldogs	13.11 (89)
23 Sep, MCG
Geelong	8.12 (60)
Sydney	15.7 (97)

Grand final
1 Oct, MCG
Sydney	10.7 (67)
Western Bulldogs	13.11 (89)

=== Week one ===
	Qualifying finals
QF2: Friday, 9 September (7:50 pm)	Geelong 12.13 (85)	def.	Hawthorn 12.11 (83)	MCG (crowd: 87,533)	Report
QF1: Saturday, 10 September (3:20 pm)	Sydney 7.13 (55)	def. by	Greater Western Sydney 12.19 (91)	ANZ Stadium (crowd: 60,222)	Report

	Elimination finals
EF2: Thursday, 8 September (6:10 pm)	West Coast 7.10 (52)	def. by	Western Bulldogs 14.15 (99)	Domain Stadium (crowd: 42,079)	Report
EF1: Saturday, 10 September (7:10 pm)	Adelaide 21.15 (141)	def.	North Melbourne 12.7 (79)	Adelaide Oval (crowd: 49,007)	Report
The Western Bulldogs won their first week one final since 2006, and their first interstate final in the club's history.; Greater Western Sydney won their first ever finals match.

=== Week two ===
	Semi finals
SF2: Friday, 16 September (7:50 pm)	Hawthorn 12.12 (84)	def. by	Western Bulldogs 16.11 (107)	MCG (crowd: 87,823)	Report
SF1: Saturday, 17 September (7:25 pm)	Sydney 18.10 (118)	def.	Adelaide 12.10 (82)	SCG (crowd: 38,136)	Report

=== Week three ===
	Preliminary finals
PF2: Friday, 23 September (7:50 pm)	Geelong 8.12 (60)	def. by	Sydney 15.7 (97)	MCG (crowd: 71,772)	Report
PF1: Saturday, 24 September (5:15 pm)	Greater Western Sydney 12.11 (83)	def. by	Western Bulldogs 13.11 (89)	Spotless Stadium (crowd: 21,790)	Report
With both Geelong and Greater Western Sydney losing, this was the first time under the final eight system in which both teams who won their respective qualifying finals failed to qualify for the grand final.; The crowd of 21,790 for the match between Greater Western Sydney and the Western Bulldogs is the highest ever crowd for an AFL game at Spotless Stadium.; The Greater Western Sydney and Western Bulldogs match was the second-most watched game in AFL history outside a grand final with an average viewership of 2.387 million people.; The Western Bulldogs qualified for their first grand final since 1961.; The Western Bulldogs became the first team to finish outside the top 4 in the home and away season under the current system to qualify for the Grand Final.

=== Week four ===
	Grand Final
Saturday, 1 October (2:30 pm)	Sydney 10.7 (67)	def. by	Western Bulldogs 13.11 (89)	MCG (crowd: 99,981)	Report
The Western Bulldogs won their first premiership in sixty-two years, ending the then-longest active VFL/AFL premiership drought.; The Western Bulldogs won from the seventh on the ladder after the regular season, the lowest position from which an AFL team had ever won the premiership.; The Western Bulldogs became just the second club after Adelaide in 1997 to win four consecutive finals to win a premiership.

== Attendances ==
=== By club ===
2016 AFL attendances
Club	Total	Games	Avg. per game	Home total	Home games	Home avg.
Adelaide	944,586	24	37,948	517,612	11	47,056
Brisbane Lions	504,110	22	22,914	187,816	11	17,074
Carlton	784,445	22	35,657	389,242	11	35,386
Collingwood	972,219	22	44,192	508,066	11	46,188
Essendon	802,059	22	36,457	371,015	11	33,729
Fremantle	574,588	22	26,118	345,575	11	31,416
Geelong	910,207	24	37,925	335,490	11	30,499
Gold Coast	351,648	22	15,984	127,168	11	11,561
Greater Western Sydney	485,219	24	20,217	135,664	11	12,333
Hawthorn	1,013,973	24	42,249	403,078	11	36,643
Melbourne	686,641	22	30,977	344,591	11	31,326
North Melbourne	720,874	23	31,342	309,881	11	28,171
Port Adelaide	694,948	22	31,589	436,310	11	39,665
Richmond	900,137	22	40,915	452,609	11	41,146
St Kilda	686,842	22	31,220	340,420	11	30,947
Sydney	966,681	26	37,180	367,679	11	33,425
West Coast	786,853	23	34,211	401,997	11	36,545
Western Bulldogs	954,452	26	36,710	337,685	11	30,699

=== By ground ===
2016 ground attendances
Ground	Total	Games	Avg. per game
Adelaide Oval	1,002,929	23	43,606
ANZ Stadium	60,222	1	60,222
Aurora Stadium	55,418	4	13,855
Blundstone Arena	46,946	3	15,649
Cazaly's Stadium	8,509	1	8,509
Domain Stadium	789,651	23	34,333
Etihad Stadium	1,392,126	46	30,264
Gabba	187,816	11	17,074
Manuka Oval	38,658	3	12,886
MCG	2,434,905	50	48,698
Metricon Stadium	127,168	11	11,561
Simonds Stadium	187,973	8	23,497
Spotless Stadium	118,796	9	13,200
SCG	405,815	12	33,818
TIO Stadium	8,163	1	8,163
TIO Traeger Park	5,146	1	5,146

== Awards ==
- The Brownlow Medal was awarded to Patrick Dangerfield of Geelong, who received 35 votes. He broke Dane Swan's 2011 record for the most votes by any player under the 3–2–1 voting system, until the record was broken a year later by Dustin Martin.
- The Coleman Medal was awarded to Josh Kennedy of West Coast, who kicked 80 goals during the home and away season.
- The Ron Evans Medal was awarded to Callum Mills of Sydney, who received 49 votes.
- The Norm Smith Medal was awarded to Jason Johannisen of the Western Bulldogs.
- The AFL Goal of the Year was awarded to Eddie Betts of Adelaide for the second consecutive season.
- The AFL Mark of the Year was awarded to Majak Daw of North Melbourne.
- The McClelland Trophy was awarded to Sydney for the first time since 2014.
- The wooden spoon was "awarded" to Essendon for the first time since 1933, breaking an 83-year drought.
- The AFL Players Association Awards
  - The Leigh Matthews Trophy was awarded to Patrick Dangerfield of Geelong.
  - The Robert Rose Award was awarded to Luke Parker of Sydney for the second consecutive year.
  - The best captain was awarded to Taylor Walker of Adelaide.
  - The best first year player was awarded to Callum Mills of Sydney.
  - The 22under22 team captaincy was awarded to Marcus Bontempelli of the Western Bulldogs.
- The AFL Coaches Association Awards
  - The AFL Coaches Association Player of the Year Award was awarded to Patrick Dangerfield of Geelong, who received 121 votes.
  - The inaugural Gary Ayres Award for the best player in the finals series was awarded to Josh Kennedy of Sydney.
  - The Allan Jeans Senior Coach of the Year Award was awarded to Luke Beveridge of the Western Bulldogs for the second consecutive year.
  - The Assistant Coach of the Year Award was awarded to Stuart Dew of Sydney.
  - The Career and Development Coach of the Year Award was awarded to Andrew McQualter of Richmond and Danny Sexton of St Kilda.
  - The Lifetime Achievement Award was awarded to Mark Williams.
  - The Best Young Player Award was awarded to Isaac Heeney of Sydney.
  - The Media Award was awarded to Gerard Whateley for his work on Fox Footy and the Australian Broadcasting Corporation.
- The Jim Stynes Community Leadership Award was awarded to Jimmy Bartel of Geelong.

=== Milestones ===
Name	Club	Milestone	Round	Ref.
Michael Rischitelli	Gold Coast	200 AFL games	Round 1	
Leigh Montagna	St Kilda	250 AFL games	Round 1	
Nick Riewoldt	St Kilda	300 AFL games	Round 2	
Matt Priddis	West Coast	200 AFL games	Round 3	
Joel Patfull	Greater Western Sydney	200 AFL games	Round 4	
Shaun Burgoyne	Hawthorn	300 AFL games	Round 5	
Rodney Eade	Gold Coast	600 AFL games played/coached	Round 5	
Drew Petrie	North Melbourne	300 AFL games	Round 7	
Nick Malceski	Gold Coast	200 AFL games	Round 8	
Kade Simpson	Carlton	250 AFL games	Round 8	
Jordan Lewis	Hawthorn	250 AFL games	Round 10	
John Worsfold	Essendon	500 AFL games played/coached	Round 10	
Brent Harvey	North Melbourne	500 AFL goals	Round 11	
Josh Gibson	Hawthorn	200 AFL games	Round 11	
Heath Grundy	Sydney	200 AFL games	Round 13	
Bryce Gibbs	Carlton	200 AFL games	Round 14	
Andrew Walker	Carlton	200 AFL games	Round 15	
Kieren Jack	Sydney	200 AFL games	Round 16	
Andrew Swallow	North Melbourne	200 AFL games	Round 16	
Andrew Mackie	Geelong	250 AFL games	Round 17	
Scott Thompson	Adelaide	300 AFL games	Round 17	
Sam Mitchell	Hawthorn	300 AFL games	Round 18	
Jimmy Bartel	Geelong	300 AFL games	Round 19	
Brent Harvey	North Melbourne	427 AFL games (league record)	Round 19	
Matthew Pavlich	Fremantle	350 AFL games	Round 19	
Justin Westhoff	Port Adelaide	200 AFL games	Round 20	
John Worsfold	Essendon	300 AFL games coached	Round 20	
Jack Riewoldt	Richmond	200 AFL games	Round 21	
Harry Taylor	Geelong	200 AFL games	Round 21	
David Mundy	Fremantle	250 AFL games	Round 22	
Eddie Betts	Adelaide	250 AFL games	Round 22	
Adam Cooney	Essendon	250 AFL games	Round 22	
Mathew Stokes	Essendon	200 AFL games	Round 22	
Dale Thomas	Carlton	200 AFL games	Round 23	
Daniel Merrett	Brisbane Lions	200 AFL games	Round 23	
Matthew Pavlich	Fremantle	700 AFL goals	Round 23	
Shannon Hurn	West Coast	200 AFL games	Finals week 1	

=== Coleman Medal ===
- Numbers highlighted in blue indicates the player led the Coleman that round.
- Underlined numbers indicates the player did not play that round.

	Player	1	2	3	4	5	6	7	8	9	10	11	12	13	14	15	16	17	18	19	20	21	22	23	Total
1	Josh J. Kennedy	8_{8}	1_{9}	1_{10}	2_{12}	2_{14}	3_{17}	3_{20}	5_{25}	7_{32}	5_{37}	1_{38}	3_{41}	5_{46}	0_{46}	3_{49}	4_{53}	2_{55}	3_{58}	2_{60}	7_{67}	3_{70}	5_{75}	5_{80}	80
2	Lance Franklin	4_{4}	4_{8}	4_{12}	4_{16}	2_{18}	5_{23}	6_{29}	5_{34}	3_{37}	3_{40}	1_{41}	2_{43}	4_{47}	0_{47}	5_{52}	1_{53}	0_{53}	4_{57}	2_{59}	2_{61}	6_{67}	0_{67}	7_{74}	74
3	Eddie Betts	1_{1}	5_{6}	3_{9}	4_{13}	3_{16}	4_{20}	0_{20}	2_{22}	0_{22}	5_{27}	1_{28}	5_{33}	0_{33}	2_{35}	3_{38}	3_{41}	3_{44}	1_{45}	5_{50}	4_{54}	6_{60}	5_{65}	1_{66}	66
3	Tom Lynch	4_{4}	5_{9}	4_{13}	5_{18}	4_{22}	2_{24}	4_{28}	2_{30}	2_{32}	2_{34}	1_{35}	4_{39}	0_{39}	3_{42}	1_{43}	5_{48}	3_{51}	4_{55}	2_{57}	4_{61}	2_{63}	2_{65}	1_{66}	66
5	Josh Jenkins	5_{5}	4_{9}	1_{10}	1_{11}	2_{13}	2_{15}	8_{23}	2_{25}	1_{26}	1_{27}	7_{34}	3_{37}	0_{37}	1_{38}	2_{40}	3_{43}	1_{44}	3_{47}	2_{49}	3_{52}	5_{57}	2_{59}	3_{60}	60
6	Tom Hawkins	2_{2}	3_{5}	4_{9}	0_{9}	1_{10}	4_{14}	3_{17}	0_{17}	4_{21}	1_{22}	2_{24}	0_{24}	4_{28}	3_{31}	0_{31}	2_{33}	1_{34}	4_{38}	2_{40}	3_{43}	1_{44}	2_{46}	6_{52}	52
7	Jeremy Cameron	0_{0}	0_{0}	0_{0}	0_{0}	5_{5}	3_{8}	1_{9}	7_{16}	5_{21}	1_{22}	0_{22}	1_{23}	2_{25}	3_{28}	0_{28}	5_{33}	3_{36}	2_{38}	2_{40}	4_{44}	1_{45}	3_{48}	1_{49}	49
8	Jack Riewoldt	2_{2}	3_{5}	1_{6}	4_{10}	3_{13}	3_{16}	3_{19}	1_{20}	2_{22}	2_{24}	2_{26}	1_{27}	0_{27}	4_{31}	4_{35}	2_{37}	0_{37}	2_{39}	2_{41}	4_{45}	1_{46}	1_{47}	1_{48}	48
8	Jack Gunston	3_{3}	1_{4}	2_{6}	0_{6}	1_{7}	5_{12}	4_{16}	3_{19}	4_{23}	2_{25}	3_{28}	4_{32}	0_{32}	1_{33}	0_{33}	3_{36}	2_{38}	3_{41}	1_{42}	2_{44}	1_{45}	2_{47}	1_{48}	48
10	Tim Membrey	0_{0}	0_{0}	0_{0}	0_{0}	0_{0}	5_{5}	3_{8}	0_{8}	3_{11}	3_{14}	1_{15}	5_{20}	0_{0}	1_{21}	2_{23}	5_{28}	4_{32}	2_{34}	0_{34}	5_{39}	1_{40}	2_{42}	2_{44}	44
10	Cyril Rioli	0_{0}	4_{4}	3_{7}	1_{8}	4_{12}	1_{13}	1_{14}	0_{14}	1_{15}	5_{19}	1_{20}	3_{23}	2_{25}	0_{25}	0_{25}	3_{28}	2_{30}	3_{34}	0_{34}	4_{38}	3_{41}	0_{44}	3_{44}	44

=== Best and fairest ===
Club	Award name	Player	Ref.
Adelaide	Malcolm Blight Medal	Rory Sloane	
Brisbane Lions	Merrett–Murray Medal	Dayne Zorko	
Carlton	John Nicholls Medal	Sam Docherty	
Collingwood	Copeland Trophy	Scott Pendlebury	
Essendon	W. S. Crichton Medal	Zach Merrett	
Fremantle	Doig Medal	Lachie Neale	
Geelong	Carji Greeves Medal	Patrick Dangerfield	
Gold Coast	Club Champion	Tom Lynch	
Greater Western Sydney	Kevin Sheedy Medal	Toby Greene	
Hawthorn	Peter Crimmins Medal	Sam Mitchell	
Melbourne	Keith 'Bluey' Truscott Medal	Jack Viney	
North Melbourne	Syd Barker Medal	Robbie Tarrant	
Port Adelaide	John Cahill Medal	Robbie Gray	
Richmond	Jack Dyer Medal	Dustin Martin	
St Kilda	Trevor Barker Award	Jack Steven	
Sydney	Bob Skilton Medal	Josh Kennedy	
West Coast	John Worsfold Medal	Luke Shuey	
Western Bulldogs	Charles Sutton Medal	Marcus Bontempelli	

== Club leadership ==
Club	Coach	Captain(s)	Vice-captain(s)	Leadership group	Reference
Adelaide	Don Pyke	Taylor Walker		Richard Douglas, Sam Jacobs, Rory Sloane, Daniel Talia, Scott Thompson, Nathan van Berlo	
Brisbane Lions	Justin Leppitsch	Tom Rockliff	Pearce Hanley, Daniel Rich, Dayne Zorko, Dayne Beams, Daniel Merrett		
Carlton	Brendon Bolton	Marc Murphy	Kade Simpson	Patrick Cripps, Ed Curnow, Sam Docherty, Bryce Gibbs, Andrew Walker	
Collingwood	Nathan Buckley	Scott Pendlebury	Nathan Brown, Steele Sidebottom, Taylor Adams, Brent Macaffer		
Essendon	John Worsfold	Brendon Goddard	Mark Baguley	Joe Daniher, James Gwilt, Zach Merrett, David Zaharakis	
Fremantle	Ross Lyon	David Mundy		Nat Fyfe, Aaron Sandilands, Lee Spurr, Matthew Pavlich, Michael Johnson	
Geelong	Chris Scott	Joel Selwood	Harry Taylor	Mark Blicavs, Patrick Dangerfield, Mitch Duncan, Tom Hawkins	
Gold Coast	Rodney Eade	Gary Ablett	Tom Lynch, Dion Prestia, Steven May	Nick Malceski, Michael Rischitelli, David Swallow, Jarrod Harbrow, Matt Rosa, Jaeger O'Meara	
Greater Western Sydney	Leon Cameron	Phil Davis; Callan Ward	Heath Shaw	Matthew Buntine, Stephen Coniglio, Dylan Shiel, Devon Smith	
Hawthorn	Alastair Clarkson	Luke Hodge		Jarryd Roughead, Jordan Lewis, Sam Mitchell, Josh Gibson, Isaac Smith	
Melbourne	Paul Roos	Nathan Jones		Max Gawn, Colin Garland, Jack Viney, Bernie Vince, Tom McDonald	
North Melbourne	Brad Scott	Andrew Swallow	Jack Ziebell	Shaun Higgins, Jamie Macmillan, Scott Thompson	
Port Adelaide	Ken Hinkley	Travis Boak	Hamish Hartlett	Brad Ebert, Jack Hombsch, Tom Jonas, Matthew Lobbe, Justin Westhoff, Ollie Wines	
Richmond	Damien Hardwick	Trent Cotchin	Brett Deledio, Ivan Maric	Alex Rance, Shane Edwards	
St Kilda	Alan Richardson	Nick Riewoldt		David Armitage, Sean Dempster, Jarryn Geary, Leigh Montagna, Jack Newnes, Jack Steven, Maverick Weller	
Sydney	John Longmire	Kieren Jack; Jarrad McVeigh		Heath Grundy, Dan Hannebery, Josh Kennedy, Luke Parker, Dane Rampe, Nick Smith	
West Coast	Adam Simpson	Shannon Hurn	Josh Kennedy	Eric Mackenzie, Matt Priddis, Luke Shuey	
Western Bulldogs	Luke Beveridge	Bob Murphy	Easton Wood	Matthew Boyd, Marcus Bontempelli, Dale Morris	

== Coach changes ==
Coach	Club	Date	Notes	Caretaker	New coach
Paul Roos	Melbourne	27 August 2016	Retired at the end of the season as part of a succession plan	—N/a	Simon Goodwin
Justin Leppitsch	Brisbane Lions	29 August 2016	Sacked following continued poor on-field performances in 2016	—N/a	Chris Fagan

== Club memberships ==
2016 AFL membership figures
Club	Members	Change from 2015	% change from 2015
Adelaide	54,307	▲1,387	▲2.62%
Brisbane Lions	23,286	▼2,122	▼8.35%
Carlton	50,130	▲2,825	▲5.97%
Collingwood	74,643	▼394	▼0.53%
Essendon	57,494	▼3,324	▼5.47%
Fremantle	51,889	▲456	▲0.89%
Geelong	50,571	▲6,259	▲14.12%
Gold Coast	12,854	▼789	▼5.78%
Greater Western Sydney	15,312	▲1,832	▲15.59%
Hawthorn	75,351	▲2,427	▲3.33%
Melbourne	39,146	▲3,193	▲8.88%
North Melbourne	45,014	▲4,002	▲9.78%
Port Adelaide	53,743	▼314	▼0.58%
Richmond	72,278	▲1,469	▲2.07%
St Kilda	38,009	▲5,263	▲16.07%
Sydney	56,523	▲7,687	▲15.74%
West Coast	65,188	▲4,967	▲8.25%
Western Bulldogs	39,459	▲4,237	▲12.03%
Total	875,197	▲39,061	▲4.67%

== Notable events ==
=== Essendon supplements scandal ===
On 12 January 2016, after appealing the AFL anti-doping tribunal's verdict that 34 past and present Essendon players were found not guilty of taking an illegal substance during the 2012 season, the Court of Arbitration for Sport returned a final verdict of guilty; as a result, these players, including twelve still at the club, five at another as well as 17 players who are currently playing at lower levels or have retired altogether, were suspended for the entire season.
