= VFL/AFL premiership and grand final statistics =

This page is a collection of VFL/AFL premiership and grand final statistics. The Australian Football League (AFL), known as the Victorian Football League (VFL) until 1990, is the elite national competition in men's Australian rules football. Each year, the premiership is awarded to the club that wins the AFL Grand Final. The grand final has been played in all VFL/AFL seasons except for 1897 and 1924 (where the premiership was awarded without a grand final being played), and has been an annual tradition in its current format since 1931.

Since the introduction by the League of equalisation policies of a salary cap and draft in 1987, every team currently competing in the Australian Football League, except for Gold Coast, has qualified for a grand final. This has had a significant impact on the spread of premierships: since 1990, fourteen clubs have won a premiership, compared with only five clubs between 1967 and 1989. Of the teams currently competing in the Australian Football League, only Fremantle, Gold Coast and Greater Western Sydney are yet to win a premiership.

As of 2026, Collingwood, Essendon and Carlton are all tied for winning 16 premierships, with Collingwood winning the most consecutive premierships, at four between 1927 and 1930.

== Premierships by team ==
Club	Years in competition	Premierships		Runners-up	
Club	Years in competition	Total	Years	Total	Years
Collingwood	1897–present	16	1902, 1903, 1910, 1917, 1919, 1927, 1928, 1929, 1930, 1935, 1936, 1953, 1958, 1990, 2010, 2023	27	1901, 1905, 1911, 1915, 1918, 1920, 1922, 1925, 1926, 1937, 1938, 1939, 1952, 1955, 1956, 1960, 1964, 1966, 1970, 1977, 1979, 1980, 1981, 2002, 2003, 2011, 2018
Essendon	1897–1915, 1918–present	16	1897, 1901, 1911, 1912, 1923, 1924, 1942, 1946, 1949, 1950, 1962, 1965, 1984, 1985, 1993, 2000	14	1898, 1902, 1908, 1941, 1943, 1947, 1948, 1951, 1957, 1959, 1968, 1983, 1990, 2001
Carlton	1897–present	16	1906, 1907, 1908, 1914, 1915, 1938, 1945, 1947, 1968, 1970, 1972, 1979, 1981, 1982, 1987, 1995	13	1904, 1909, 1910, 1916, 1921, 1932, 1949, 1962, 1969, 1973, 1986, 1993, 1999
Richmond	1908–present	13	1920, 1921, 1932, 1934, 1943, 1967, 1969, 1973, 1974, 1980, 2017, 2019, 2020	12	1919, 1924, 1927, 1928, 1929, 1931, 1933, 1940, 1942, 1944, 1972, 1982
Hawthorn	1925–present	13	1961, 1971, 1976, 1978, 1983, 1986, 1988, 1989, 1991, 2008, 2013, 2014, 2015	6	1963, 1975, 1984, 1985, 1987, 2012
Melbourne	1897–present	13	1900, 1926, 1939, 1940, 1941, 1948, 1955, 1956, 1957, 1959, 1960, 1964, 2021	5	1946, 1954, 1958, 1988, 2000
Geelong	1897–present	10	1925, 1931, 1937, 1951, 1952, 1963, 2007, 2009, 2011, 2022	11	1897, 1930, 1953, 1967, 1989, 1992, 1994, 1995, 2008, 2020, 2025
Fitzroy	1897–1996	8	1898, 1899, 1904, 1905, 1913, 1916, 1922, 1944	5	1900, 1903, 1906, 1917, 1923
Brisbane Lions	1997–present	6	2001, 2002, 2003, 2024, 2025, 2026	2	2004, 2023
South Melbourne / Sydney	1897–present	5	1909, 1918, 1933, 2005, 2012	14	1899, 1907, 1912, 1914, 1934, 1935, 1936, 1945, 1996, 2006, 2014, 2016, 2022, 2024
North Melbourne	1925–present	4	1975, 1977, 1996, 1999	5	1950, 1974, 1976, 1978, 1998
West Coast	1987–present	4	1992, 1994, 2006, 2018	3	1991, 2005, 2015
Footscray / Western Bulldogs	1925–present	2	1954, 2016	2	1961, 2021
Adelaide	1991–present	2	1997, 1998	1	2017
St Kilda	1897–present	1	1966	6	1913, 1965, 1971, 1997, 2009, 2010
Port Adelaide	1997–present	1	2004	1	2007
Fremantle	1995–present	0	—	2	2013, 2026
Greater Western Sydney	2012–present	0	—	1	2019
Gold Coast	2011–present	0	—	0	—
Brisbane Bears	1987–1996	0	—	0	—
University	1908–1914	0	—	0	—

Table correct to the end of the 2026 season.

== Premiership frequency ==
Club	Years in competition	Seasons	Premierships	Runners-up	Strike rate (based on seasons in competition)	Average seasons per	
Club	Years in competition	Seasons	Premierships	Runners-up	Strike rate (based on seasons in competition)	Premiership	Grand final
Brisbane Lions	1997–present	30	6	2	20%	5	3.75
Hawthorn	1925–present	102	13	6	12.75%	7.85	5.37
Essendon	1897–1915, 1918–present	128	16	14	12.5%	8	4.27
Collingwood	1897–present	130	16	27	12.31%	8.13	3.02
Carlton	1897–present	130	16	13	12.31%	8.13	4.48
Richmond	1908–present	119	13	12	10.92%	9.15	4.76
Melbourne	1897–1915, 1919–present	127	13	5	10.24%	9.77	7.06
West Coast	1987–present	40	4	3	10%	10	5.71
Fitzroy	1897–1996	100	8	5	8%	12.5	7.69
Geelong	1897–1915, 1917–1941, 1944–present	127	10	11	7.87%	12.7	6.05
Adelaide	1991–present	36	2	1	5.56%	18	12
North Melbourne	1925–present	102	4	5	3.92%	25.5	11.33
South Melbourne / Sydney	1897–1915, 1917–present	129	5	14	3.88%	25.8	6.79
Port Adelaide	1997–present	30	1	1	3.33%	30	15
Footscray / Western Bulldogs	1925–present	102	2	2	1.96%	51	25.5
St Kilda	1897–1915, 1918–present	128	1	6	0.78%	128	18.29
Greater Western Sydney	2012–present	15	0	1	0%	—	15
Fremantle	1995–present	32	0	2	0%	—	16
University	1908–1914	7	0	0	0%	—	—
Brisbane Bears	1987–1996	10	0	0	0%	—	—
Gold Coast	2011–present	16	0	0	0%	—	—

Table correct to the end of the 2026 season.

== Premiership droughts ==
^{+}	Drought began upon club's entry to league
^{†}	Drought ended upon club's exit from league
*	Also the longest club premiership drought

The following tables summarise the different premiership droughts for each club. The first table is limited to droughts lasting fifty or more seasons, while the other three are specific to each club (two of which span the entire competition, including all 21 teams). The duration of the drought is given as the number of full seasons contested between premierships; the season in which the drought is broken is considered to be part of the drought, and if the drought began from a club's entry to the league, the club's inaugural season is also considered to be part of the drought. Grand final replays are not included in grand final appearances.

=== Longest premiership droughts ===
Club	Seasons	Start	End	Grand final appearances during drought
South Melbourne / Sydney	72	1933	2005	1934, 1935, 1936, 1945, 1996
St Kilda	69	1897^{+}	1966	1913, 1965
Footscray / Western Bulldogs	62	1954	2016	1961
St Kilda	60	1966	—	1971, 1997, 2009, 2010
Melbourne	57	1964	2021	1988, 2000
Fitzroy	52	1944	1996^{†}	—
North Melbourne	50	1925^{+}	1975	1950, 1974

Table correct to the end of the 2026 season.

=== Longest club premiership droughts ===
Club	Seasons	Start	End	Grand final appearances during drought
Adelaide	28	1998	—	2017
Brisbane Bears	10	1987^{+}	1996^{†}	—
Brisbane Lions	21	2003	2024	2004, 2023
Carlton	31	1995	—	1999
Collingwood	32	1958	1990	1960, 1964, 1966, 1970, 1977, 1979, 1980, 1981
Essendon	26	2000	—	2001
Fitzroy	52	1944	1996^{†}	—
Footscray / Western Bulldogs	62	1954	2016	1961
Fremantle	32*	1995^{+}	—	2013, 2026
Geelong	44	1963	2007	1967, 1989, 1992, 1994, 1995
Gold Coast	16*	2011^{+}	—	—
Greater Western Sydney	15*	2012^{+}	—	2019
Hawthorn	36	1925^{+}	1961	—
Melbourne	57	1964	2021	1988, 2000
North Melbourne	50	1925^{+}	1975	1950, 1974
Port Adelaide	22	2004	—	2007
Richmond	37	1980	2017	1982
St Kilda	69	1897^{+}	1966	1913, 1965
South Melbourne / Sydney	72	1933	2005	1934, 1935, 1936, 1945, 1996
University	7	1908^{+}	1914^{†}	—
West Coast	12	1994	2006	2005
West Coast	12	2006	2018	2015

Table correct up until the end of the 2026 season.

=== Current club premiership droughts ===
Club	Seasons	Start	Grand final appearances during drought
Adelaide	28*	1998	2017
Brisbane Lions	0	2026	—
Carlton	31*	1995	1999
Collingwood	3	2023	—
Essendon	26*	2000	2001
Fremantle	32*	1995^{+}	2013, 2026
Geelong	4	2022	2025
Gold Coast	16*	2011^{+}	—
Greater Western Sydney	15*	2012^{+}	2019
Hawthorn	11	2015	—
Melbourne	5	2021	—
North Melbourne	27	1999	—
Port Adelaide	22*	2004	2007
Richmond	6	2020	—
St Kilda	60	1966	1971, 1997, 2009, 2010
Sydney	14	2012	2014, 2016, 2022, 2024
West Coast	8	2018	—
Western Bulldogs	10	2016	2021

Table correct up until the end of the 2026 season.

=== Time taken to win first premiership ===
°	Club has not yet won a premiership
^{×}	Club exited the league without winning a premiership

Club	Seasons	Entry to league	First premiership	Grand final appearances during drought
Adelaide	7	1991	1997	—
Brisbane Bears	10^{×}	1987	—	—
Brisbane Lions	5	1997	2001	—
Carlton	10	1897	1906	1904
Collingwood	6	1897	1902	1901
Essendon	1	1897	1897	—
Fitzroy	2	1897	1898	—
Footscray / Western Bulldogs	30	1925	1954	—
Fremantle	32°	1995	—	2013, 2026
Geelong	29	1897	1925	—
Gold Coast	16°	2011	—	—
Greater Western Sydney	15°	2012	—	2019
Hawthorn	37*	1925	1961	—
Melbourne	4	1897	1900	—
North Melbourne	51*	1925	1975	1950, 1974
Port Adelaide	8	1997	2004	—
Richmond	13	1908	1920	1919
St Kilda	70*	1897	1966	1913, 1965
South Melbourne / Sydney	13	1897	1909	1899, 1907
University	7^{×}	1908	—	—
West Coast	6	1987	1992	1991

Table correct to the end of the 2026 season.

== Consecutive appearances ==
=== Consecutive premierships ===
#	Club	Years
4	Collingwood	1927, 1928, 1929, 1930
3	Carlton	1906, 1907, 1908
3	Melbourne	1939, 1940, 1941
3	Melbourne	1955, 1956, 1957
3	Brisbane Lions	2001, 2002, 2003
3	Hawthorn	2013, 2014, 2015
3	Brisbane Lions	2024, 2025, 2026
2	Fitzroy	1898, 1899
2	Collingwood	1902, 1903
2	Fitzroy	1904, 1905
2	Essendon	1911, 1912
2	Carlton	1914, 1915
2	Richmond	1920, 1921
2	Essendon	1923, 1924
2	Collingwood	1935, 1936
2	Essendon	1949, 1950
2	Geelong	1951, 1952
2	Melbourne	1959, 1960
2	Richmond	1973, 1974
2	Carlton	1981, 1982
2	Essendon	1984, 1985
2	Hawthorn	1988, 1989
2	Adelaide	1997, 1998
2	Richmond	2019, 2020

=== Consecutive grand finals ===
#	Club	Years	Win/loss
7	Melbourne	1954, 1955, 1956, 1957, 1958, 1959, 1960	L, W, W, W, L, W, W
7	Hawthorn	1983, 1984, 1985, 1986, 1987, 1988, 1989	W, L, L, W, L, W, W
6	Collingwood	1925, 1926, 1927, 1928, 1929, 1930	L, L, W, W, W, W
6	Essendon	1946, 1947, 1948^{1}, 1949, 1950, 1951	W, L, L, W, W, L
5	Carlton	1906, 1907, 1908, 1909, 1910	W, W, W, L, L
5	Collingwood	1935, 1936, 1937, 1938, 1939	W, W, L, L, L
5	North Melbourne	1974, 1975, 1976, 1977^{2}, 1978	L, W, L, W, L
4	Fitzroy	1903, 1904, 1905, 1906	L, W, W, L
4	Collingwood	1917, 1918, 1919, 1920	W, L, W, L
4	Richmond	1931, 1932, 1933, 1934	L, W, L, W
4	South Melbourne	1933, 1934, 1935, 1936	W, L, L, L
4	Brisbane Lions	2001, 2002, 2003, 2004	W, W, W, L
4	Hawthorn	2012, 2013, 2014, 2015	L, W, W, W
4	Brisbane Lions	2023, 2024, 2025, 2026	L, W, W, W
3	Fitzroy	1898, 1899, 1900	W, W, L
3	Collingwood	1901, 1902, 1903	L, W, W
3	Carlton	1914, 1915, 1916	W, W, L
3	Richmond	1919, 1920, 1921	L, W, W
3	Richmond	1927, 1928, 1929	L, L, L
3	Melbourne	1939, 1940, 1941	W, W, W
3	Essendon	1941, 1942, 1943	L, W, L
3	Richmond	1942, 1943, 1944	L, W, L
3	Geelong	1951, 1952, 1953	W, W, L
3	Carlton	1968, 1969, 1970	W, L, W
3	Richmond	1972, 1973, 1974	L, W, W
3	Collingwood	1979, 1980, 1981	L, L, L
3	Essendon	1983, 1984, 1985	L, W, W
3	Geelong	2007, 2008, 2009	W, L, W

^{1} Essendon drew the 1948 VFL Grand Final, and was defeated by Melbourne in the replay.
^{2} North Melbourne drew the 1977 VFL Grand Final, and defeated Collingwood in the replay.

Table correct to the end of the 2026 season.

== Most common match-ups ==
The following table summarises the most common grand final match-ups (not including grand final replays).

#	Match-up	Grand final appearances
7	Collingwood vs Melbourne	1926, 1939, 1955, 1956, 1958, 1960, 1964
6	Carlton vs Collingwood	1910, 1915, 1938, 1970, 1979, 1981
6	Carlton vs Essendon	1908, 1947, 1949, 1962, 1968, 1993
6	Carlton vs Richmond	1921, 1932, 1969, 1972, 1973, 1982
6	Collingwood vs Geelong	1925, 1930, 1937, 1952, 1953, 2011
6	Collingwood vs Richmond	1919, 1920, 1927, 1928, 1929, 1980
6	Essendon vs Melbourne	1941, 1946, 1948, 1957, 1959, 2000
4	Carlton vs South Melbourne	1907, 1909, 1914, 1945
4	Collingwood vs Essendon	1901, 1902, 1911, 1990
4	Collingwood vs Fitzroy	1903, 1905, 1917, 1922

Table correct to the end of the 2026 season.

== Premierships at all levels ==
This table summarises premierships won at all levels of the VFL/AFL competition: the seniors, seconds/reserves (1919–1999), thirds/under-19s (1946–1991), night series (1956–2013) and AFL Women's (since 2017). Only AFL and AFLW premierships can currently be won; excluded from this table are premierships won by reserves teams competing in state leagues (including the VFL from 2000 onwards).

Club	Seniors	Reserves	Under-19s	Night	AFLW	Total
Essendon	16	8	5	6	0	35
Melbourne	13	12	6	3	1	35
Carlton	16	8	6	4	0	34
Richmond	13	9	11	1	0	34
Collingwood	16	7	4	2	0	28
Geelong	10	13	1	3	0	27
Hawthorn	13	4	1	9	0	27
North Melbourne	4	7	7	5	2	25
Fitzroy	8	3	2	2	—	15
Footscray / Western Bulldogs	2	6	1	4	1	14
South Melbourne / Sydney	5	0	1	4	0	10
St Kilda	1	3	1	4	0	9
Brisbane Lions	6	—	—	1	2	9
Adelaide	2	—	—	2	3	7
West Coast	4	—	—	0	0	4
Port Adelaide	1	—	—	2	0	3
Brisbane Bears	0	1	—	0	—	1
University	0	—	—	—	—	0
Fremantle	0	—	—	0	0	0
Gold Coast	0	—	—	0	0	0
Greater Western Sydney	0	—	—	0	0	0

Table correct to the end of the 2026 AFL season.

=== Premierships across multiple grades in a season ===
A club has won premierships in three grades in a single year on only two occasions – Essendon in 1950, and Richmond in 1973. During the years that it was achievable, no club ever won a senior, reserves, under-19s and night premiership in a single year.

Season	Club	Seniors	Reserves	Under-19s	Night	AFLW	Total
1950	Essendon	Yes	Yes	Yes	N/A	N/A	3/3
1951	Carlton	No	Yes	Yes	N/A	N/A	2/3
1952	Essendon	No	Yes	Yes	N/A	N/A	2/3
1954	Footscray	Yes	No	Yes	N/A	N/A	2/3
1956	South Melbourne	No	No	Yes	Yes (Note: The 1956 VFL Night Series Competition was only for the teams who missed the finals (5th to 12th on ladder).)	N/A	2/4
1965	Collingwood	No	Yes	Yes	N/A (Note: The 1965 VFL Night Series Competition was only for the teams who missed the finals (5th to 12th on ladder).)	N/A	2/3
1971	Melbourne	No	No	Yes	Yes (Note: The 1971 VFL Night Series Competition was only for the teams who missed the finals (5th to 12th on ladder).)	N/A	2/4
1972	Hawthorn	No	Yes	Yes	N/A	N/A	2/3
1973	Richmond	Yes	Yes	Yes	N/A	N/A	3/3
1977	Richmond	No	Yes	Yes	No	N/A	2/4
1984	Essendon	Yes	No	No	Yes	N/A	2/4
1985	Hawthorn	No	Yes	No	Yes	N/A	2/4
1986	Hawthorn	Yes	No	No	Yes	N/A	2/4
1988	Hawthorn	Yes	No	No	Yes	N/A	2/4
1991	Hawthorn	Yes	No	No	Yes	N/A	2/4
1993	Essendon	Yes	No	N/A	Yes	N/A	2/3
1995	North Melbourne	No	Yes	N/A	Yes	N/A	2/3
1996	North Melbourne	Yes	Yes	N/A	No	N/A	2/3
2000	Essendon	Yes	N/A	N/A	Yes	N/A	2/2
2009	Geelong	Yes	N/A	N/A	Yes	N/A	2/2

Table correct to the end of the 2023 AFL season.

== See also ==
- List of VFL/AFL premiers
- List of VFL/AFL premiership captains and coaches
- List of VFL/AFL pre-season and night series premiers
- List of AFL Women's premiers
- AFL Grand Final

== Sources ==
- Australian Football League
- Full Points Footy
- AFL Tables
