= Neville Beard =

Australian rules footballer

Personal information
- Full name: Neville Gilbert Beard
- Born: 19 November 1936 (age 89); East Fremantle, Western Australia

Playing career^{1}
Years	Club	Games (Goals)
1956–1963	Perth	126 (?)
- ^{1} Playing statistics correct to the end of 1963.

Neville Gilbert Beard (born 19 November 1936) is a former Australian rules footballer who played with Perth in the West Australian National Football League (WANFL) from 1956 to 1963.

Beard played mostly as a ruck-rover and in defence. He won the Sandover Medal in 1961, beating Ray Sorrell on a countback. Beard represented Western Australia just once in his career, against South Australia at Perth in 1962. He had been selected in the Brisbane Carnival squad the previous year but was unable to play due to an injury.

His father, Bert played in the Victorian Football League in the 1930s.
