= Bert Beard =

Australian rules footballer (1909–1983)

Personal information
- Full name: Gilbert Vaughan Beard
- Born: 5 July 1909; Northam, Western Australia
- Died: 8 November 1983 (aged 74)
- Original team: South Fremantle (WANFL)
- Height: 185 cm (6 ft 1 in)
- Weight: 86 kg (190 lb)

Playing career^{1}
Years	Club	Games (Goals)
1930, 1936	South Fremantle	
1932–1935	South Melbourne	36 (19)
1935	Fitzroy	13 (6)
Total		49 (25)
- ^{1} Playing statistics correct to the end of 1935.

Gilbert Vaughan "Bert" Beard (a.k.a. "Blue" Beard; "Bluey" Beard) (5 July 1909 – 8 November 1983) was an Australian rules footballer from Western Australia who played with South Melbourne in the Victorian Football League (VFL) during the 1930s. He also played first-grade cricket for the South Melbourne Cricket Club.

== Family ==
The son of John Beard (1848-1924), and Sarah Beard (1866-1951), née Gibson, Gilbert Vaughan Beard was born at Northam, Western Australia on 5 July 1909.

He married Olive Eva Murphy (1909-1961) on 17 August 1935. Their son, Neville played in the West Australian Football League and won the Sandover Medal in 1961.

== Football ==
He was a ruckman.

=== South Fremantle ===
Beard was recruited to South Melbourne from the South Fremantle in the West Australian Football League (WANFL).

=== South Melbourne ===
He made his VFL debut for South Melbourne in 1932.

He was one of a number of South Melbourne players who were given immediate, long-term, secure, paid employment outside of football within the (137 store) grocery empire of the South Melbourne president, South Melbourne Lord Mayor, and Member of the Victorian Legislative Council, Archie Crofts. The collection of players recruited from interstate in 1932/1933 become known as South Melbourne's "Foreign Legion".

In 1933, he was 19th man in the club's premiership side; he replaced injured half-back flanker Hugh McLaughlin in the second quarter.

=== Fitzroy ===
He stayed at South Melbourne until the 1935 season when after one game he decided to cross to Fitzroy to play out the season.

=== South Fremantle ===
Accepting the offer of lucrative employment from a West Australian bakery firm, Beard left Melbourne and returned to Perth in March 1936. Once his clearance from Fitzroy had been obtained, He played his first match, in his return season, on 4 July 1936. By early 1937, he had returned to Victoria.

=== Bairnsdale ===
In 1938 he was appointed captain-coach of the Bairnsdale Football Club, in the Gippsland Football League, as a replacement for Fred Gilby who has been appointed elsewhere. Despite Beard's efforts ("For Bairnsdale the most outstanding performers were B. Beard (whose marking was superb), …"), Bairnsdale were defeated by the Maffra Football Club, 13.13 (91) to 10.13 (73).

=== South Melbourne Districts ===
He was appointed captain-coach of the South Melbourne Districts Football Club (in the Sub-District Football League) in 1939.
