= Jack Stenhouse =

Australian rules footballer, born 1911

Personal information
- Full name: Jack Stenhouse
- Born: 20 November 1911
- Died: 31 October 1987 (aged 75)
- Original team: Burnley
- Height: 185 cm (6 ft 1 in)
- Weight: 76 kg (168 lb)

Playing career^{1}
Years	Club	Games (Goals)
1933–1934	Richmond	19 (0)
1935	Essendon	4 (0)
1936	Hawthorn	1 (0)
Total		24 (0)
- ^{1} Playing statistics correct to the end of 1936.

Jack Stenhouse (20 November 1911 – 31 October 1987) was an Australian rules footballer who played with Richmond, Essendon and Hawthorn in the Victorian Football League (VFL).

Stenhouse, a defender from Burnley, made 13 appearances for Richmond in 1933. The last of those games was the 1933 VFL Grand Final loss to South Melbourne, which he played as a half back flanker.

He finished his league career with stints at Essendon and Hawthorn, in 1935 and 1936 respectively.
