= Hugh McLaughlin Jr. =

Australian rules footballer

Hugh McLaughlin

Personal information
- Full name: Hugh E. McLaughlin
- Born: 13 October 1935
- Died: 21 May 2004 (aged 68)
- Original team: South Melbourne juniors
- Height: 178 cm (5 ft 10 in)
- Weight: 72 kg (159 lb)

Playing career^{1}
Years	Club	Games (Goals)
1955–1964	South Melbourne	116 (5)
- ^{1} Playing statistics correct to the end of 1964.

Hugh McLaughlin (13 October 1935 – 21 May 2004) was an Australian rules footballer who played with South Melbourne in the Victorian Football League (VFL) during the 1950s and 1960s.

McLaughlin was a back pocket player who made his debut for South Melbourne in 1955. The previous year, he had trained with Footscray. He came second in South Melbourne's best and fairest award in 1962. His father, also named Hugh, also played football for South Melbourne and Footscray, and was a member of South Melbourne's 1933 Premiership team.

After retiring as a player, McLaughlin stayed at South Melbourne as a committeeman and recruiter, including being involved in the recruiting of Terry Daniher to the club in 1975.
