= Dinny Kelleher =

Australian rules footballer, born 1902

Denis Kelleher

Personal information
- Born: 22 July 1902; Baddaginnie, Victoria
- Died: 30 May 1963 (aged 60)
- Original teams: Baddaginnie, Benalla, Wangaratta.
- Height: 187 cm (6 ft 2 in)
- Weight: 101 kg (223 lb)

Playing career^{1}
Years	Club	Games (Goals)
1927–1932	Carlton	54 (1)
1933–1936	South Melbourne	59 (14)
Total		113 (15)
- ^{1} Playing statistics correct to the end of 1936.

Denis "Dinny" Kelleher (22 July 1902 – 30 May 1963) was an Australian rules footballer who played for Carlton and South Melbourne in the Victorian Football League (VFL).

== Early life ==
Born in the small rural town of Baddaginnie in 1902. He apparently captained his school's football team, then went on to play with Baddaginnie in the Euroa District Football Association in 1919, 1920 and 1921.

Kelleher then played with Benalla in the Ovens and Murray Football League in 1922 and 1923, gaining selection in the OMFL team against the VFL in 1923.

He stood out of football in 1924 as Benalla refused to clear him to Wangaratta. Standing out of football for a year gave him an automatic clearance. At Wangaratta he played as the team's centre half-forward in their 1925 Ovens and Murray Football League premiership and in their 1926 Ovens and Murray Football League grand final loss to St. Patrick's. Kelleher represented the O&MFL in a match against the VFL in 1926 at Albury.

== VFL career ==
Carlton initially tried to recruit Kelleher in 1925, after he was spotted playing for Wangaratta in the Ovens and Murray Football League. He later played well in a practice match with Carlton in April 1926, before returning to Wangaratta, then played seven senior VFL games in 1927. They considered him a plodder so after six years he began to look elsewhere. Kelleher also played mid-week with the Railways team which may have sapped his energy. Kelleher was the first big name Melbourne footballer to be recruited by a team in the Hampden League. Camperdown offered him the position as captain-coach and he accepted. Carlton took their time clearing him as he played the first four games of the 1932 season with the Blues. Unfortunately for Kelleher and Camperdown they finished last in 1932.

He Returned to Carlton in 1933 but only managed to play a few games in the seconds before South Melbourne recruited him. His first game was against Melbourne and that started an eleven-game winning streak which culminated in the 1933 premiership.

A solid 101 kg follower, Kelleher was a member of South's three unsuccessful VFL grand finals sides of 1934, 1935, and 1936.

== Post VFL ==
Leaving South Melbourne for Murtoa in the Wimmera, he was there for two years before moving on to Tasmania. Kelleher coached four different teams to premierships.

He captain-coached City to NTFA premierships in 1939 and 1941 before retiring as a player in 1941.
