= Jack Bisset =

Australian rules footballer (1900–1966)

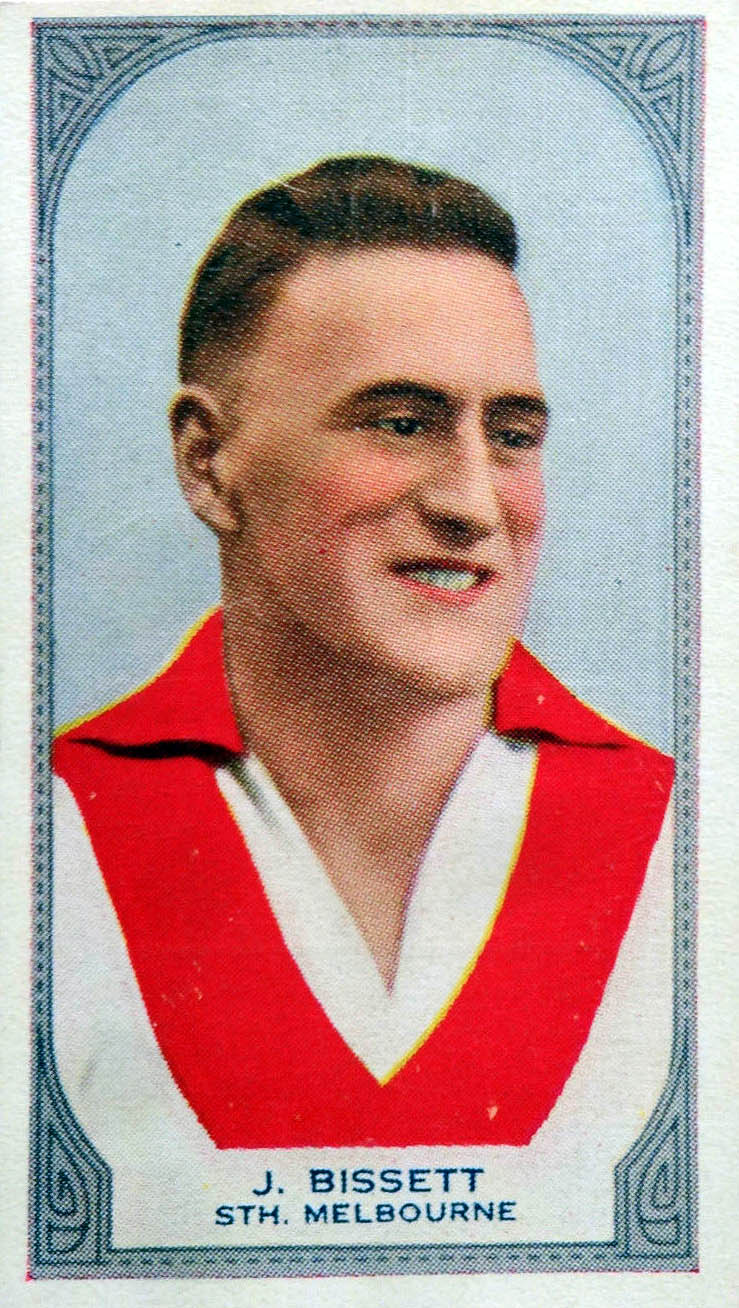
- Bisset on a Hoadleys' trading card, 1933

Personal information
- Full name: John James Bisset
- Born: 1 September 1900; Longwarry, Victoria
- Died: 21 August 1966 (aged 65); Caulfield, Victoria
- Original teams: Nar Nar Goon (EDFL); Port Melbourne (VFA); Stawell (WFL)
- Height: 180 cm (5 ft 11 in)
- Weight: 83 kg (183 lb)

Playing career^{1}
Years	Club	Games (Goals)
1928 & 1931	Richmond	38 (9)
1932–1936	South Melbourne	90 (9)
Total		128 (18)

Coaching career^{3}
Years	Club	Games (W–L–D)
1933–1936	South Melbourne	80 (63–17–0)
- ^{1} Playing statistics correct to the end of 1936.^{3} Coaching statistics correct as of 1936.

Career highlights
- South Melbourne premiership captain-coach 1933; South Melbourne captain 1933–1936

John James Bisset (1 September 1900 – 21 August 1966) was an Australian rules footballer who played for the Richmond Football Club and played for and coached the South Melbourne Football Club in the VFL.

== Family ==
He married Bridget Catherine Quigley (1896–1971) in 1920. Their son, Ray Bisset, played for Fitzroy Second XVIII and Melbourne Second XVIII, before playing for the Moe Football Club; and their daughter married Des Healey.

== Football ==
=== Nar Nar Goon ===
Bisset started his football career at Nar Nar Goon, captaining their 1921 premiership side. He also played with Nar Nar Goon in 1924 and 1925.

=== Port Melbourne ===
He moved to Port Melbourne in the VFA in 1922 was fullback for their premiership side in that year.

=== Stawell ===
He was captain-coach of Stawell in the Wimmera Football League from 1926 to 1927, with a premiership in 1926. He began playing as a follower.

=== Richmond ===
He moved to Richmond where he made his VFL debut in 1928. He spent two seasons with the Tigers, 1928 and 1931, both ending in Grand Final losses.

=== Nhill ===
In between his two seasons at Richmond he was captain-coach at Nhill. In 1930, he was part of the combined Wimmera Football League team that defeated a combined Gippsland team 11.15 (81) to 4.8 (32), in the Victorian Country Football Championship match, played on Saturday, 9 August 1930, on a very muddy M.C.G.

=== South Melbourne ===
In 1932 he was recruited by South Melbourne and became their captain-coach the following season. Bisset had an immediate impact on the club, guiding them to their first premiership in 15 years — the collection of players recruited from interstate in 1932/1933 became known as South Melbourne's "Foreign Legion".

He remained coach until the end of the 1936 season having reached the Grand Final in every year. South Melbourne however could not repeat their 1933 success, losing the Grand Finals by 39, 20 and 11 points respectively.

=== Port Melbourne ===
He was appointed captain-coach of Port Melbourne in 1937; however, as a consequence of the team's poor performance, he resigned his position mid-way through the season.

=== Rainbow ===
In 1938, he was appointed captain coach of the Rainbow Football Club in the Southern Mallee Football Association. He was unable to play for part of the season due to having fractured ribs. Rainbow lost the 1938 Grand Final against Hopetoun Football Club 21.11 (137) to 11.6 (72).

== Military service ==
He enlisted in the Second AIF in June 1940.

== Team of the century ==
Having won 63 of the 80 games that he coached, Bisset was named coach of the Swans' official 'Team of the Century'.
