= Terry Brain =

Australian rules footballer (born 1907)

Personal information
- Born: 14 August 1907
- Died: 15 August 1984 (aged 77)
- Original team: South Melbourne Districts
- Height: 173 cm (5 ft 8 in)
- Weight: 70 kg (154 lb)

Playing career^{1}
Years	Club	Games (Goals)
1928–1937	South Melbourne	141 (198)
- ^{1} Playing statistics correct to the end of 1937.

Career highlights
- 1934 South Melbourne Best and Fairest

Terence Brain (14 August 1907 – 15 August 1984) was a leading Australian rules footballer of the 1930s who played with South Melbourne in the Victorian Football League (VFL).

The son of a boot repairer, Brain grew up in the South Melbourne area but boarded in Clifton Hill, which was in opposing team Collingwood's recruiting zone. Following Collingwood's request to transfer Brain, South Melbourne named him in the senior side in 1928. A lightly built rover, Brain was one of the few Victorians in the South Melbourne side of the 1930s which was known as the 'foreign legion'. Brain played 141 games for the club, including the 1933 VFL Grand Final win when he kicked two goals. He won South Melbourne's Best and Fairest in 1934. Brain initially retired football at the end of 1937, but then played a season under throw-pass rules with Victorian Football Association club Camberwell in 1938.
