= Ray Martin (Australian footballer) =

Australian rules footballer, born 1909

Personal information
- Full name: John Raymond Martin
- Born: 18 November 1909; Rutherglen, Victoria
- Died: 28 July 1988 (aged 78); Parkville, Victoria
- Original teams: West Hawthorn Amateurs, Daylesford
- Height: 173 cm (5 ft 8 in)
- Weight: 73 kg (161 lb)

Playing career^{1}
Years	Club	Games (Goals)
1930–1940	Richmond	159 (135)
- ^{1} Playing statistics correct to the end of 1940.

Career highlights
- Richmond VFL Reserves Premiership Player: 1929; Richmond VFL Senior Premiership Player: 1932, 1934; Richmond Reserves Best & Fairest: 1930; Richmond Seniors Best & Fairest: 1934 & 1935; VFL Interstate Games: 4

John Raymond Martin (18 November 1909 – 28 July 1988) was an Australian rules footballer who played in the VFL in 1930 and then from 1932 to 1940 for the Richmond Football Club.

Martin played with Daylesford in the Ballarat Football League in 1931, then returned to Richmond in 1932.

Martin was a member of Richmond's 1932 and 1934 VFL Premiership teams. He also won two club best and fairest awards in 1934 and 1935.
