= Jock McKenzie (Australian footballer) =

Australian rules footballer (1911–1989)

Personal information
- Full name: William Robert McKenzie
- Born: 31 October 1911; Warburton, Victoria
- Died: 16 June 1989 (aged 77)
- Height: 178 cm (5 ft 10 in)
- Weight: 75 kg (165 lb)

Playing career^{1}
Years	Club	Games (Goals)
1931–1936	South Melbourne	44 (0)
1936–1939	Fitzroy	48 (57)
1940	South Melbourne	11 (25)
Total		103 (82)
- ^{1} Playing statistics correct to the end of 1940.

William Robert "Jock" McKenzie (31 October 1911 – 16 June 1989) was an Australian rules footballer who played with South Melbourne and Fitzroy in the VFL during the 1930s.

== Family ==
The son of John McKenzie and Elizabeth Helen Jane McKenzie, née Green, William Robert McKenzie (and his twin brother James Frank McKenzie) were born at Warburton on 31 October 1911.

== Football ==
McKenzie started his career in 1931 with South Melbourne where he played in the back pocket, enjoying premiership success in 1933. He left the club for Fitzroy during the 1936 season and was used up forward, kicking 33 goals in 1938. In 1940 he returned to South Melbourne for his final season in the Victorian Football League. He later played with Oakleigh in the Victorian Football Association.

== War Service ==
McKenzie enlisted in the Australian Army during World War II and served in transport units in Victoria and Queensland.
