= Joe O'Meara =

Australian rules footballer (1907–1985)

Personal information
- Full name: Daniel Joseph O'Meara
- Born: 16 September 1907; Perth, Western Australia
- Died: 7 November 1985 (aged 78); Adelaide, South Australia
- Original team: East Perth / Kalgoorlie Railways
- Height: 177 cm (5 ft 10 in)
- Weight: 75 kg (165 lb)

Playing career^{1}
Years	Club	Games (Goals)
1933–1936	South Melbourne	47 (36)
1936–1937	Fitzroy	10 (6)
Total		57 (42)
- ^{1} Playing statistics correct to the end of 1937.

Daniel Joseph "Brum" O'Meara (16 September 1907 – 7 November 1985) was an Australian rules footballer who played for Fitzroy and South Melbourne in the VFL during the 1930s.

== Football ==
O'Meara played as a centreman and half forward and debuted for South Melbourne in their premiership year of 1933, after being recruited from West Australia. The collection of players recruited from interstate in 1932/1933 became known as South Melbourne's "Foreign Legion".

He played on the half forward flank in the Grand Final and remained with the club until partway through the 1936 season when he crossed to Fitzroy.

== See also ==
- 1927 Melbourne Carnival
