= Bob Scott (umpire) =

Australian rules footballer (1901–1956)

Robert H. Scott (1901 – 4 August 1956) was a leading Australian rules football field umpire in the Victorian Football League (later renamed to Australian Football League) in the 1920s and 1930s.

Scott umpired irregularly until the 1929 season during which he became an automatic weekly selection, and remained so until he retired. He holds the record of seven successive VFL Grand Finals (1929–1935) as field umpire. He umpired a total of 157 VFL games during his career from 1921–1935, including 19 Finals games.

Scott was inducted to the Australian Football Hall of Fame in 1996.
