= Peter Reville =

Australian rules footballer

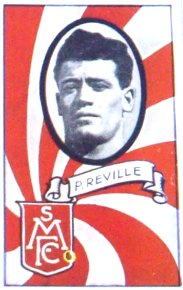

Personal information
- Full name: Henry James Reville
- Born: 5 October 1904; Carisbrook, Victoria
- Died: 4 March 1970 (aged 65); Heidelberg, Victoria
- Original team: Moe
- Height: 229 cm (7 ft 6 in)
- Weight: 112 kg (247 lb)

Playing career^{1}
Years	Club	Games (Goals)
1925–1934	South Melbourne	156 (207)
1938–1939	Fitzroy	22 (27)
Total		178 (234)
- ^{1} Playing statistics correct to the end of 1939.

Career highlights
- 1926 Victorian Representative Player; 1930 Brownlow Medal Runner-Up; 1933 South Melbourne Premiership Player; 1936 Recorder Cup Winner

Peter Reville (born Henry James Reville; 5 October 1904 – 4 March 1970) was an Australian rules footballer who played with South Melbourne and Fitzroy in the Victorian Football League (VFL).

== VFL career ==
Considered a first class follower and half-forward of the best utility players in the VFL, he was an excellent high mark and long kick and a determined player with a good turn of pace. As a half-forward flanker he was one of the best in the 1933 flag win. Reville debuted for South Melbourne in 1925, and appeared for the club 156 times before leaving.

Reville's last game with the southerners was the premiership play-off of the following year when his admirable all round performance as a half forward-cum-follower was insufficient to prevent the Tigers achieving their revenge. Never one to take a backward step, Reville was also reported no fewer than three times during the match, but he escaped suspension by leaving the VFL scene for the VFA. The two administrative bodies often clashed and wouldn't enforce each other's decisions. Players could cross over competition without the need of a clearance.

=== Coburg (VFA) ===
He joined Coburg as captain-coach and stayed two years, winning the Recorder Cup in 1936, the VFA award for the competition's best and fairest player.

=== Fitzroy (VFL) ===
Reville resumed his VFL career in 1938, this time with Fitzroy. Still a handy player, he added 22 games and 27 goals to his tally over the ensuing couple of seasons before finally retiring.

== Military service ==
Reville enlisted in the Australian Army at Clifton Hill on the 17 November 1939. He served with the 6th Division in the Middle East and in New Guinea. He was discharged from the Army on 23 December 1943.

== Post-football ==
Reville was a match day radio reporter for 3AW.

== Death ==
Reville died on 4 March 1970 and is buried at the Fawkner Cemetery.
