= Hec McKay =

Australian rules footballer, born 1904

Personal information
- Full name: Hector Alexander McKay
- Born: 15 December 1904; Brunswick East, Victoria
- Died: 15 March 1969 (aged 64); Heidelberg, Victoria
- Original team: Fairfield
- Height: 180 cm (5 ft 11 in)
- Weight: 82 kg (181 lb)

Playing career^{1}
Years	Club	Games (Goals)
1926–1935	South Melbourne	152 (1)
- ^{1} Playing statistics correct to the end of 1935.

Hector Alexander McKay (15 December 1904 – 15 March 1969) was an Australian rules footballer who played with South Melbourne in the VFL.

A defender, McKay debuted for South Melbourne in 1926 and won their Best and Fairest the following season. He played at fullback in the club's 1933 Grand Final win.
