= Harry Clarke (Australian footballer, born 1905) =

Australian rules footballer, born 1905

Personal information
- Born: 15 September 1905
- Died: 21 February 1989 (aged 83)
- Original team: Middle Park
- Height: 175 cm (5 ft 9 in)
- Weight: 69 kg (152 lb)

Playing career^{1}
| Years | Club | Games (Goals) |
| 1926–1935 | South Melbourne | 147 (33) |
- ^{1} Playing statistics correct to the end of 1935.

Harry Clarke (15 September 1905 – 21 February 1989) was a leading Australian rules footballer of the 1920s and 1930s who played with South Melbourne in the Victorian Football League (VFL).

The son of the curator at the Middle Park Lawn bowls club, Clarke was a wingman and won the Best and Fairest award for South Melbourne in their premiership season of 1933.

In addition to playing 147 games for South Melbourne Clarke also appeared 11 times for Victoria in interstate football.

In 2003 Clarke was named in the Swans' official 'Team of the Century'.
