= Bert Foster =

Australian rules footballer, born 1906

Personal information
- Born: 19 August 1906; Echuca, Victoria
- Died: 31 August 1942 (aged 36); Sandringham, Victoria
- Original team: Echuca
- Height: 185 cm (6 ft 1 in)
- Weight: 89 kg (196 lb)

Playing career^{1}
Years	Club	Games (Goals)
1928–1936	Richmond	133 (65)
- ^{1} Playing statistics correct to the end of 1936.

Career highlights
- Richmond Premiership Player 1934; Interstate Games:- 1; Richmond Seconds Captain 1939; Runner up in Brownlow Medal, 1930

Bert Foster (19 August 1906 – 31 August 1942) was an Australian rules footballer who played in the Victorian Football League between 1928 and 1936 for the Richmond Football Club. Originally from Echuca, he later coached the Richmond seconds team and the Sandringham Football Club in the Victorian Football Association. He was a fireman for the MFB and died on duty.
