= Hugh McLaughlin Sr. =

Australian rules footballer, born 1909

Hugh McLaughlin

Personal information
- Full name: Hugh James McLaughlin
- Born: 16 July 1909; Stirling, Scotland
- Died: 4 February 1977 (aged 67); Western General Hospital, Footscray, Victoria
- Original team: Duldin
- Height: 179 cm (5 ft 10 in)
- Weight: 80 kg (176 lb)

Playing career^{1}
Years	Club	Games (Goals)
1929–1934	South Melbourne	96 (0)
1935–1937	Footscray	33 (0)
Total		129 (0)
- ^{1} Playing statistics correct to the end of 1937.

Career highlights
- 1933 Premiership player; Victorian representative

Hugh James McLaughlin (16 July 1909 – 4 February 1977) was an Australian rules footballer who played with South Melbourne and Footscray in the Victorian Football League (VFL) during the 1930s.

== Family ==
The son of Hugh James McLaughlin (1882-1918), and Bridget Agnes McLaughlin (1887-1915), née Buckley, Hugh James McLaughlin was born in Stirling, Scotland on 16 July 1909.

He married Karen Emily Barbara Muster on 6 January 1934. Their son, Hugh McLaughlin Jr., also played over 100 games for South Melbourne and also represented Victoria at interstate level.

== Football ==
=== South Melbourne ===
McLaughlin was a gutsy half back flanker for South Melbourne, and was a key player with the 1933 premiership side. As well as playing 96 games for South Melbourne, he also represented Victoria at interstate football.

=== Footscray ===
In 1935 he his request for a clearance to Footscray was granted because he lived in the area.

== Death ==
He died at the Western General Hospital, in Footscray, Victoria, on the 4 February 1977.
