= 1928 VFL grand final =

Grand final of the 1928 Victorian Football League season

1928 VFL Grand Final

Collingwood	Richmond
13.18 (96)	9.9 (63)
	1	2	3	4
COLL	2.4 (16)	7.8 (50)	9.11 (65)	13.18 (96)
RICH	0.3 (3)	4.5 (29)	7.7 (49)	9.9 (63)
- Date: 29 September 1928
- Stadium: Melbourne Cricket Ground
- Attendance: 50,026

The 1928 VFL Grand Final was an Australian rules football game contested between the Collingwood Football Club and Richmond Football Club, held at the Melbourne Cricket Ground in Melbourne on 29 September 1928. It was the 30th annual Grand Final of the Victorian Football League, staged to determine the premiers for the 1928 VFL season. The match, attended by 50,026 spectators, was won by Collingwood by a margin of 33 points, marking that club's seventh premiership victory and second in succession.

== Background ==
Despite winning the 1927 flag, the 1928 season held significant hurdles for the Magpies to overcome – contentious pay cuts, a threatened player's strike, allegations of bribery against two team members and a long injury list contributed to a late-season slump. Still, they managed to top the ladder by the end of the season, winning 15 of 18 home-and-away games.

In contrast, Richmond was in excellent shape at the end of the home-and-away season. The side finished second on the ladder, and defeated Carlton by 53 points in the First Semi-Final. Collingwood and Melbourne contested a draw in the Second Semi-Final, forcing a replay the following week which was won by Collingwood by four points. As such, Richmond had a three-week break between its Semi-Final and the Grand Final.

=== Right to challenge ===
This season was played under the amended Argus system. If Richmond had won this match, Collingwood would have had the right to challenge Richmond to a rematch for the premiership on the following weekend, because Collingwood was the minor premier. The winner of that match would then have won the premiership.

== Match summary ==
Collingwood saw Richmond as a skillful, confident team, but also vulnerable to being distracted as well. They set out to taunt the Tigers with name-calling and other verbal challenges while maintaining the ball as their first objective.

The first quarter was a scramble, and the defenses of both sides held. Collingwood used all six of their followers in the ruck for the first half, saving Percy Rowe for the second half. A blistering 10 minutes in the 2nd quarter saw Collingwood seize control of the match to lead by 21 points at half time, with Gordon Coventry kicking 4 goals for the quarter. Rowe repeatedly absorbed the pressure from Richmond's backs to provide protection for Coventry run to the ball. Despite the Tigers reducing their opponent's lead to 16 points at 3-quarter time, the Magpies banged on 2 quick goals early in the final quarter to effectively seal the game. Collingwood won by 33 points, and Coventry finished with 9 goals, a Grand Final record that stood for 61 years, until equaled by Gary Ablett in the 1989 VFL Grand Final.

Added Time.
Although there was little or no wind to interfere with the play the game was extended by 22 minutes 39 seconds.
The time added to each quarter was:— First, 5min. 16sec.; second, 7min.; third, 4min., 52sec.; fourth, 5min., 31sec.
The time added to the second quarter (7 min.) was remarkable, and Mr. James Manning, who has been the timekeeper for Collingwood for 33 years, said that in all his experience he had never seen a quarter so much extended." — The Argus, 1 October 1928.

== Match statistics ==
	1st	2nd	3rd	Final
Collingwood	2.4	7.8	9.11	13.18 (96)
Richmond	0.3	4.5	7.7	9.9 (63)

Best	Collingwood	G Coventry, H Collier, S Coventry, Rowe, A Collier, F Murphy, Rumney, Libbis
	Richmond	O’Halloran, Murdoch, Watson, B McCormack, Harris, Lilburne, Fincher
Goals	Collingwood	G Coventry (9), L Murphy (2), Harris, Makeham
	Richmond	Weidner (2), Titus (2), O’Halloran (2), Emprey, (2), Goding

- Umpire – Jack McMurray
- Attendance – 50,026
- Gate – £2,533

== Teams ==
Collingwood	Richmond

Collingwood
B:	Harold Rumney	Charlie Dibbs	Albert Lauder
HB:	Albert Collier	George Clayden	Bob Makeham
C:	Norm MacLeod	Jack Beveridge	Bruce Andrew
HF:	John Harris	Frank Murphy	Harry Chesswas
F:	Percy Rowe	Gordon Coventry	Harry Collier
Foll:	Syd Coventry (c)	Len Murphy	Billy Libbis
Coach:	Jock McHale		

Richmond
B:	Don Harris	Donald Don (c)	Jack Bisset
HB:	Joe Murdoch	Bert Foster	Basil McCormack
C:	Stan Judkins	Les Gallagher	Carl Watson
HF:	Harry Weidner	George Rudolph	Jack Baggott
F:	Ralph Empey	Jack Titus	Fred Goding
Foll:	Thomas O'Halloran	Cyril Lilburne	Jack Fincher
Coach:	Checker Hughes		

== See also ==
- 1928 VFL season
