= 1927 VFL grand final =

Grand final of the 1927 Victorian Football League season

1927 VFL Grand Final
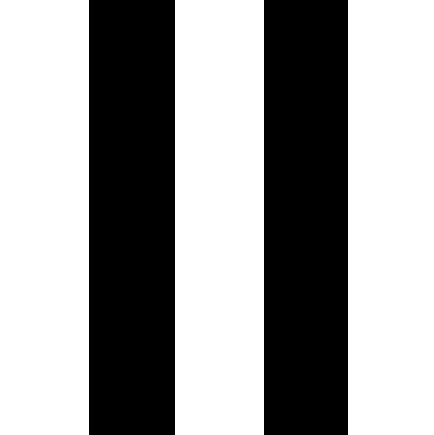

Collingwood	Richmond
2.13 (25)	1.7 (13)
	1	2	3	4
COLL	0.1 (1)	2.6 (18)	2.9 (21)	2.13 (25)
RICH	0.4 (4)	0.4 (4)	0.7 (7)	1.7 (13)
- Date: 1 October 1927
- Stadium: Melbourne Cricket Ground
- Attendance: 34,551

The 1927 VFL grand final was an Australian rules football match contested between the Collingwood Football Club and Richmond Football Club, held at the Melbourne Cricket Ground in Melbourne on 1 October 1927. It was the grand final of the Victorian Football League, staged to determine the premiers for the 1927 VFL season.

In an historically low scoring match marred by persistent heavy rain, Collingwood defeated Richmond by twelve points, to win its sixth VFL premiership.

== Background ==
Before the 1927 season, Collingwood had last won a premiership in 1919, and had suffered grand finals losses in 1920, 1922, 1925 and 1926. After pre-season training, the Collingwood committee caused a sensation by sacking three-year captain Charlie Tyson as both captain and player – he was cleared to North Melbourne. Syd Coventry was appointed captain, and went on to win the 1927 Brownlow Medal and the inaugural Copeland Trophy. Collingwood led the ladder for most of the year, and won its second consecutive minor premiership with a 15–3 record. It comfortably defeated third-placed Geelong by 66 points in the semi-final to qualify for the final.

Richmond, having finished seventh in 1925 and 1926, had a strong improvement in form with the development of number of young players who formed the core of its team over the next decade. In 1927, Richmond finished second on the ladder with 14–4, in what was ultimately the first of nine consecutive finals appearances. In its semi-final, Richmond defeated fourth-placed Carlton by six points.

The clubs had faced each other twice during the year: Richmond 7.13 (55) defeated Collingwood 6.13 (49) at Victoria Park on 14 May and Collingwood 12.12 (84) defeated Richmond 9.7 (61) at the Richmond Cricket Ground on 30 July. Collingwood was a more experienced and bigger-bodied team, while Richmond was known as a more speedy, skilful and youthful side, and an even match was expected.

This match was originally the final under the amended Argus system, and Collingwood as minor premier still had its double chance. If Collingwood were to win the match, it would be premiers; if Richmond were to win, a challenge final would have been played the following week between the same two clubs to determine the premiers.

== Match summary ==
The reserves final was played as a curtain raiser, in which South Melbourne 10.11 (71) defeated minor premiers Carlton 9.10 (64) to set up a challenge final for the following week.

=== Weather conditions ===
The 1927 grand final was played in extremely poor weather conditions. It had been a relatively dry and warm week, before central Melbourne received 83pts (21mm) of rain during the night before the match. The rain had stopped by morning, and conditions were windy but fine; and when the league committee gathered at 12pm – which was the deadline for a decision on postponement of the match – reasonable conditions were expected for the afternoon. However, heavier rain returned starting between 1pm and 2pm, and a further 64pts (16mm) of rain fell continuously during the match. Altogether, central Melbourne saw 147pts (37mm) of rain in the 24hrs of the match, as part of flooding rains across the state which saw parts of Gippsland receive more than double that amount.

Consequently, ground conditions were appalling, with some areas reduced to quagmire and other areas covered with inches-deep sheets of standing water, particularly on the southern wing where the practice wickets were grown. This had a significant impact on gameplay, and on the players' ability to maintain a footing or handle the ball. Kicking off the ground was at least as frequent as attempting to possess and punt the ball. Conditions were also very windy: during the first half of the curtain-raiser (before the rain began), fourteen of fifteen goals had been scored with the aid of the strong south-westerly wind. The ambient temperature was cold, with a maximum of only 55.2°F (12.9°C).

A crowd of only 34,551 attended the match. The small gate of only £1778/12/9, coupled with Collingwood's win and subsequent lack of a challenge match, meant that the clubs' dividend from the finals gate was much lower than usual.

=== First quarter ===
Richmond won the toss and kicked to the Punt Road end with the favour of the south-westerly wind. Richmond attacked first and most often in the first ten minutes of play without score, its best chance a shot by Frank O'Brien which went between the goal posts but was called back for a free kick to Collingwood. After ten minutes, the first score was a behind to Collingwood's Percy Rowe who tipped ball through from close range. There was some rough handling and retaliation among the players, with some lingering bitterness from the teams' previous encounters; and several players came to blows early in the match.

George Rudolph secured Richmond's first behind with a long kick which hit the goal post low down. Jack McCormack, at the end of a long off-the-ground bust through the middle, won a free kick against Joe Poulter, his long free kick missing for the second behind. Richmond small Fincher injured his knee around this time, and he played forward for the rest of the match; he was inconvenienced throughout, and took a shot for goal at this stage from a good position, but his knee couldn't cope. Another strong attempt was stopped by Syd Coventry, before Richmond managed two more behinds: one by Allan Geddes in the rush, and the other by Jack McCormack from a long range free kick.

When the bell sounded, Richmond 0.4 (4) led Collingwood 0.1 (1). Play was overall balanced, Richmond having more of the play and the speedier play, but Collingwood having higher quality play against the wind, and Richmond making many mistakes. The match was a gruelling scramble through the rain and slush, and Collingwood's defence led by Syd Coventry had done its best to keep Richmond goalless. Collingwood largely kept the ball on the northern wing to mitigate the south-westerly breeze.

=== Second quarter ===
Richmond attacked first, having a couple of good attempts turned away by Collingwood full back Charlie Dibbs; but thereafter, the quarter was dominated by Collingwood. Rowe kicked his second behind after Collingwood rebounded from Richmond's attack, and Gordon Coventry had a shot from a sharp angle but put it out of bounds. After 35 minutes play across the two quarters, Gordon Coventry kicked the match's first goal, capitalising on sustained pressure to secure a long set shot with the wind from the southern flank. Four more behinds in quick succession – to John Harris, Harry Collier, George Clayden and Bob Makeham – extended Collingwood's lead to eight points. Then, shortly before half time, Gordon Coventry received a pass from Harry Collier and snapped his second goal, extending the margin to 14 points.

With seven scoring shots to none, Collingwood 2.6 (18) had opened up a healthy lead against Richmond 0.4 (4). Richmond continued to play the faster football, but it was not translating to scores in the conditions.

=== Third quarter ===
Half-time entertainment was provided by the Geelong, Collingwood and St Kilda pipe bands. The players, who were mud sodden, changed into fresh uniforms, with second guernseys underneath for warmth; many of the Richmond players' partially visible under-guernseys were in an assortment of non-Richmond colours, giving the team an unusual multi-coloured appearance, while Collingwood remained in uniform black and white.

It was a tight opening to the third quarter, again with rugged play seeing several players put down. Collingwood held territory for the first good set of chances in the quarter, Gordon Coventry scoring a behind from a free kick, and Frank Murphy soon after kicking a behind with a missed shot from 15m. Fincher scored next, a behind for Richmond. Harry Chesswas was involved in a rushed behind for Collingwood. Richmond had the best remaining chances to close the quarter, Doug Hayes kicking a behind from an out of bounds free kick, and a shot by Thomas O'Halloran kicking a behind after a mark. Another good chance by Hayes and O'Halloran was turned away by Charlie Dibbs with a mark on the goal-line to end the quarter.

With both teams kicking three behinds in the quarter, Collingwood retained its advantage of 14 points, Collingwood 2.9 (21) leading Richmond 0.7 (7).

=== Final quarter ===
Richmond attacked first in the final quarter, and kicked its first goal inside the first minute of play: Rudolph and Bob O'Neill had advancing the ball with a chain of kicks along the ground, ending with Fincher behind the forward pack who kicked 30yds along the ground for Richmond's first goal, narrowing the margin to eight points. Richmond had another couple of quick opportunities, with one attack stopped by a free kick, and a long run by Geddes in which he touched the ball to the ground three times ending with a spilled pass to a Richmond forward.

Collingwood crowded the match to defend its lead, before advancing the ball and kicking three quick behinds, the third to Harris coming particularly close to goal. Richmond attacked, but continued to miss chances, including Fincher kicking into an opponent with twelve minute remaining, and O'Halloran kicking out of bounds from a mark. Late in the match, Collingwood's Harold Rumney kicked out of bounds from a shot from right in front which would have put the result beyond doubt. Frank Murphy kicked a late behind.

Despite Richmond's attacking, it managed only 1.0 (6) to 0.4 (4) for the quarter. Collingwood won the match by twelve points, 2.13 (25) def. 1.7 (13).

=== Overall ===
Collingwood was the better team on the day, playing better to the conditions. In particular, Collingwood was more inclined to kick off the ground than Richmond, kicked the ball longer when it did opt to possess the ball, and tended to wait at ground level around the packs to win the ball after Richmond spilled marks in the wet weather; while Richmond tried harder to play with its natural possession and dash game, attempted and failed at more aerial marking. Collingwood managed its two goals from the southern wing with the breeze at their backs, while Richmond often lost possession trying to attack through the submerged wing of the ground. Long kicking, long runs, and kicks off the ground were the standard, and passing between players was minimal in the conditions. Collingwood had an overall edge in the ruck and stoppages. Richmond won the free kick count 72–57; a total of 45 of the free kicks were for out of bounds.

Collingwood captain Syd Coventry, playing reliably in defence for Collingwood, was generally considered best on ground, named as such by sportswriters in the Sporting Globe, the Advertiser, the Weekly Times, Labor Call and the Australasian. Fellow Collingwood defender Ernie Wilson was named best in the Age, and it was Collingwood's defence overall which was considered its biggest strength in the match. Albert Collier, Charlie Dibbs, Leo Wescott, Frank Murphy, Percy Rowe and Bob Makeham (who was widely lauded for his strong marking) also figured among Collingwood's best.

Richmond captain and wingman Allan Geddes, doing the best among all players at handling the ball despite the conditions and advancing with dash, was named best in the Argus and was widely considered Richmond's best. Frank O'Brien, who also handled the ball well, forward/followers Jack Fincher and Doug Hayes, and defenders Cyril Lilburne and Don Harris were also among the best.

Gordon Coventry kicked both of Collingwood's goals, to finish the season with 97 goals. Entering the match with 95 goals, many had hoped Coventry would become the first player to kick 100 goals in a VFL season, but with the season ending after the match this did not occur.

The match set several marks and records in low scoring. The match's aggregate score of 3.20 (38) is the lowest-scoring match in the VFL since round 6, 1900, making it the lowest-scoring match (grand final or otherwise) in the 20th century; there has been no lower scoring match in the 21st century as of 2024, and there were only ten lower-scoring matches in the 19th century. Collingwood's score of 2.13 (25) is the lowest winning score in a grand final, and Richmond's 1.7 (13) is the lowest score overall in a grand final.

=== Aftermath ===
A charity rematch for the Lord Mayor's fund was considered for the following Saturday to make up for the lack of spectacle and takings, but Collingwood declined to play against Richmond at risk that its premiership would be diminished in the event of defeat. Other attempts were made to stage a match, with Geelong challenging Richmond and Fitzroy offering to play, but by the time those offers were made it was no longer possible to secure a venue. Collingwood travelled to Adelaide to play SANFL premiers West Adelaide on 15 October, Collingwood 14.10 (94) defeating West Adelaide 9.12 (66) at the Adelaide Showground before a crowd of 10,200.

== Teams ==
Neither team made any changes to its initially selected semi-final eighteen for the match, but Richmond made one late change: George Robinson coming in for Jack Baggott – the club's leading goalkicker in his first senior season – who suffered a side injury after falling heavily from a high mark in Thursday's training session. Richmond was also still missing champion full back Donald Don, who was out with influenza.

Collingwood	Richmond

Collingwood
B:	Leo Wescott	Charlie Dibbs	Joe Poulter
HB:	Ernie Wilson	George Clayden	Albert Collier
C:	Harry Chesswas	Jack Beveridge	Charlie Milburn
HF:	Frank Murphy	Bob Makeham	John Harris
F:	Harold Rumney	Gordon Coventry	Harry Collier
Foll:	Syd Coventry (c)	Percy Rowe	Billy Libbis
Coach:	Jock McHale		

Richmond
B:	Don Harris	Cyril Powell	Angus MacIsaac
HB:	Cyril Lilburne	Percy Bentley	Basil McCormack
C:	Frank O'Brien	Les Gallagher	Allan Geddes (c)
HF:	Harry Weidner	George Rudolph	Sam Jamison
F:	George Robinson	Jack McCormack	Jack Fincher
Foll:	Thomas O'Halloran	Bob O'Neill	Doug Hayes
Coach:	Checker Hughes		

== Scorecard ==
1927 VFL final
Saturday, 1 October	Collingwood	def.	Richmond	Melbourne Cricket Ground (crowd: 34,551)
0.1 (1); 2.6 (18); 2.9 (21); 2.13 (25)	Q1; Q2; Q3; Final	0.4 (4); 0.4 (4); 0.7 (7); 1.7 (13)	Umpires: Jack McMurray
G. Coventry 2	Goals	Fincher
Chesswas (rib) Wilson (cut eye).	Injuries	Fincher (knee), O'Neill (corked thigh)

== See also ==
- 1927 VFL season
