= Bruce Andrew =

Australian rules footballer

Bruce Andrew MBE

Personal information
- Full name: Cyril Bruce Andrew
- Born: 28 February 1908; Collingwood, Victoria
- Died: 6 June 1996 (aged 88)
- Original team: Abbotsford
- Height: 174 cm (5 ft 9 in)
- Weight: 69 kg (152 lb)

Playing career^{1}
| Years | Club | Games (Goals) |
| 1928–1934 | Collingwood | 67 (11) |
- ^{1} Playing statistics correct to the end of 1934.

Career highlights
- 2x VFL premiership player: 1928, 1930; Vice-President Collingwood F.C. (1933–1940); Field Director Australian National Football Council (1949–1976); Secretary ANFC (1950–1976); Panellist HSV-7, World of Sport (1960–1980); Australian Football Hall of Fame inductee (1996)

Cyril Bruce Andrew MBE (28 February 1908 – 6 June 1996) was an Australian rules footballer, who played for Collingwood Football Club in the Victorian Football League (VFL) before becoming a football administrator and television commentator.

He was famous for his immaculate hairstyle, with its signature centre-parting: "[his] hair was parted so emphatically down the centre that it was claimed he used a theodolite."

His services to the VFL were honoured by the awarding of VFL life membership, and his subsequent induction into the Australian Football Hall of Fame.

== Collingwood ==
Bruce Andrew was light framed wingman, and the 321st player to play for Collingwood's senior team. He was considered to be one of the fastest wingmen in the competition, and had good all round skills, although he was rather injury prone. He played his first senior game for Collingwood, on the wing, against Fitzroy in round 13 of the 1928 season on 14 July 1928, having been promoted from the Seconds to replace an out of form Jack Beveridge; the match report in The Argus noted that "the new man, Andrew, from the second eighteen, fully justified his inclusion".

He played from 1928 to 1932; and, then, as club vice-president, he returned to the football field at the end of the 1934, playing 4 games because the team was depleted due to injuries to the regular 1934 players. He played a total of 62 senior games in his VFL career.

He was a member of the 1928 Collingwood premiership team; he played on Stan Judkins and received six free kicks. In October 1928, after the 1928 season had finished, he badly damaged his neck whilst bathing at Mornington. He dived too deeply, and struck his head on the bottom. The injury was serious enough for the doctor who examined him at Mornington, to have him taken immediately by ambulance from Mornington to St Vincent's Hospital at Fitzroy.

He only played four senior games in 1929.

In October 1930, having been dropped from the team for the previous week's preliminary final match against Geelong – which Collingwood lost, 9.11 (65) to Geelong's 12.19 (91) – he was selected on the wing for the 1930 Grand Final against Geelong and, playing on Jack Carney was one of the best on the ground for the Collingwood team that won 14.16 (100) to 9.16 (70), despite the absence of its coach Jock McHale due to illness (he had pleurisy). Noting that Collingwood had awarded its trophy for the champion player of the match to half-forward Bob Makeham, The Argus described Andrew as "invincible" on the wing.

On one occasion his individual brilliance and intelligent initiative was his downfall. Collingwood coach Jock McHale always insisted that his players remained in their position's set location at all times. Twice during one match, Bruce Andrew raced away from his position on the wing, and ran deeply into the forward line to kick two scintillating goals. Rather than being congratulated, he was immediately taken off the field by McHale; which meant, in those days, before the concept of "interchange", that Andrew was off the ground for the rest of the match. McHale told him "We've got bloody forwards to do that!".

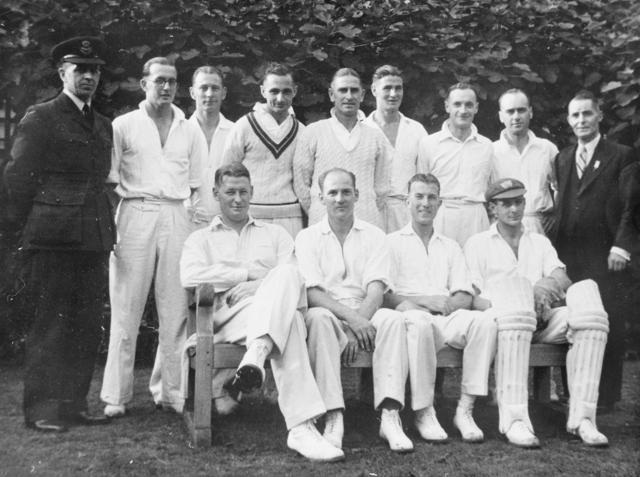
R.A.A.F. cricket team. Bruce Andrew is fifth player from the left.

== War service ==
During the Second World War Andrew served in the Royal Australian Air Force from 3 July 1940 to 3 August 1945, with the rank of Flight Lieutenant.

He served at the R.A.A.F.'s overseas headquarters in London.

=== Cricket ===
Along with Keith Miller he played in the R.A.A.F. cricket team in England.

On Saturday, 11 September 1943, he played in a cricket match R.A.A.F. vs. R.A.F. at Lord's Cricket Ground.

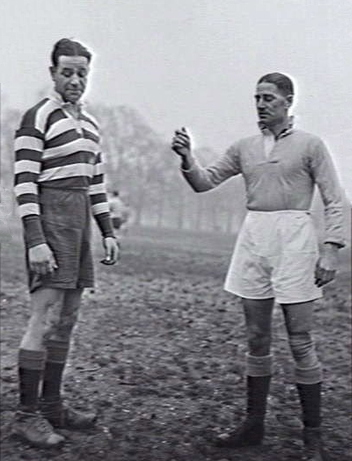
Warrant Officer J.L. Forrest (1924), R.A.A.F.No.10 Squadron (left), and Flight Lieutenant C.B. Andrew (251991), of R.A.A.F. HQ at the toss of the coin, Hyde Park, 8 January 1944.

=== Australian rules football ===
He played football for the R.A.A.F. on many occasions.

On 8 January 1944, he was captain of the R.A.A.F. H.Q. team that played against the R.A.A.F.No.10 Squadron team that included the former Footscray footballer Sergeant Alfred Birch Sampson (418304).

The H.Q. team won the match 12.7 (79) to 5.4 (34), with Andrew kicking seven goals for the H.Q. team.

=== Rugby Union ===
In 1943, Andrew became known as "the rugby sensation of the year". Whilst stationed in the U.K. Andrews attended a rugby match to support a R.A.A.F. team. The team was a man short; and the team's management coerced Andrew to play. Although Andrew had never played rugby before, he was an outstanding success; and, from that time on, was an automatic selection— e.g., he played at right wing for the R.A.A.F. team (captained by Flight Lieutenant J.B. Nicholls) against R.N.Z.A.F. at the Richmond Athletic Ground on Saturday 23 October 1943.

He expressed some reservation about what his famous Collingwood coach, Jock McHale might think of his "conversion" to rugby union. When approached by The Argus for comment, McHale was not at all astonished at his instant success at rugby union:

"Bruce is a player likely to make good in any sport. He can pick up a ball with either hand while running at full pace, and can turn in his track faster than any man I know. He knows all the football tricks, and should make an excellent Rugby player. I wish him success."

== After football ==
Once his playing career was over, and his war service was over, Andrew enjoyed a career as a football administrator and journalist with The Sporting Globe.

His administrative career spanned 43 years and included:

- Collingwood vice-president 1933–1940 (unusually, he served as vice-president whilst still a player);
- Australian National Football Council (ANFC) field director 1949–1976 (his initial appointment was for five years, at an annual salary of £1,000, plus expenses); and
- ANFC Secretary 1950–1976;

In 1957, Andrew worked as a co-commentator with Ron Casey in the football broadcasts from 3DB.

He was also, again with Ron Casey, a panellist on 3DB's sister television station, HSV-7's sporting programme, World of Sport, from 1960 to 1980; and, especially, he was the judge of the show's long-kicking competitions.

== Honours ==
Andrew was appointed Member of the Order of the British Empire (MBE) in the 1972 Birthday Honours and inducted to the Australian Football Hall of Fame as an administrator in 1996.

== See also ==
- Australian football at the 1956 Summer Olympics
