= Jack McCormack (Australian rules footballer) =

Australian rules footballer

Personal information
- Full name: John Joseph McCormack
- Born: 4 June 1904; Navigators, Victoria
- Died: 5 June 1966 (aged 62); Ballarat, Victoria
- Original team: South Ballarat
- Height: 175 cm (5 ft 9 in)
- Weight: 76 kg (168 lb)

Playing career^{1}
Years	Club	Games (Goals)
1927–1929	Richmond	24 (74)
1930	Preston (VFA)	15 (50)
- ^{1} Playing statistics correct to the end of 1930.

John Joseph McCormack (4 June 1904 – 5 June 1966) was an Australian rules footballer who played with Richmond in the Victorian Football League (VFL).

== Career ==
McCormack, a forward recruited from South Ballarat, played at Richmond for three seasons. He kicked five goals on his league debut, against Footscray at Western Oval in the 15th round of the 1927 VFL season. In round 18 he bettered that tally with six goals in a win over Hawthorn. He was one of Richmond's best players when they defeated Carlton narrowly by six points in the first semi final, with four goals, one of them from a drop kick after the three quarter time bell. In the 1927 VFL Grand Final, which Richmond lost to Collingwood, McCormack was held goal-less at full-forward, but wasn't the only forward to struggle, as the match was played in heavy rain.

He played only five games in the 1928 VFL season and took no part in Richmond's finals campaign, which ended with another grand final loss.

In 1929 he started the season well enough to be second in the goal-kicking after three rounds with 16 goals, behind Gordon Coventry. This included a career best seven goal haul, against Essendon at Windy Hill. He finished the season with 46 goals, from 13 appearances, the last in round 14, which placed him inside the top 10 for the league and second at Richmond.

Following his career with Richmond, McCormack played with Preston in the Victorian Football Association. He was their leading goal-kicker in the 1930 VFA season, with 52 goals.
