= Bob O'Neill =

Australian rules footballer (1905–1978)

Personal information
- Full name: Robert Arthur O'Neill
- Born: 16 April 1905
- Died: 16 June 1978 (aged 73); South Australia
- Original team: Richmond C.Y.M.S. F.C. (CYMSFA)
- Height: 180 cm (5 ft 11 in)
- Weight: 76 kg (168 lb)

Playing career^{1}
Years	Club	Games (Goals)
1925, 1927–28	Richmond	19 (4)
1930	Oakleigh (VFA)	13 (11)
1932–34	Camberwell (VFA)	42 (19)
- ^{1} Playing statistics correct to the end of 1928.

Robert Arthur O'Neill (16 April 1905 – 16 June 1978) was an Australian rules footballer who played with Richmond in the Victorian Football League (VFL).

== Football ==
=== Richmond (VFL) ===
Recruited from CYMS Football Association club Richmond C.Y.M.S. in 1924, he played for the Richmond Second XVIII at centre half-forward in the team that lost the semi-final to Essendon on 25 September 1924. He played his first game for the Richmond First XVIII, against Melbourne, at the MCG, on 12 September 1925, the last home-and-away game of the 1925 season.

He did not play another First XVIII game until the 30 April 1927 match, against Melbourne, at the MCG. He played in the first four and last six matches of the 1927 season, and was in the first ruck for Richmond in its 1.7 (13) grand Final loss to Collingwood 2.13 (25) in a rain-affected match on a muddy water-logged MCG.

In 1928, he played in the first seven matches. However, he was injured in the Match against Geelong, at the Punt Road Oval, on 2 June 1928, and did not play again until the semi-final, against Carlton, on 8 September 1928. He was hospitalized after the Carlton match, having "received a knock over the eye", and was not selected in the Grand Final team. At the 1929 annual meeting of the Richmond Football Club, he was awarded a trophy as the "most improved player" in the 1928 season.

He did not play at all in the 1929 season, due to the injuries he had received against Geelong in the mid-season, and against Carlton in the semi-final -- "as a result of these injuries [O'Neill's] medical adviser has instructed him not to play.

=== Oakleigh (VFA) ===
On 30 April 1930 he was cleared from Richmond to Oakleigh in the VFA. He played in the first ruck in the Oakleigh First XVIII that won the 1930 VFA Final in its second year in the VFA competition. It was an extremely violent match, and O'Neill lost several teeth.

=== Richmond (VFL) ===
On 29 April 1931, he was cleared from Oakleigh to Richmond Seconds. He was the playing coach of the Richmond Second XVIII for the 1931 season. At the end of the 1931 season he had played a total of 19 games (4 goals) for the Richmond First XVIII, and 75 games (45 goals) for the Richmond Second XVIII over six VFL seasons.

=== Camberwell (VFA) ===
On 20 April 1932 he was granted a clearance from Richmond to Camberwell.

== South Adelaide Football Club (SANFL) ==
Following his time as a footballer, he "moved to Adelaide to live [and] was involved in the building industry for many years, and also served the South Adelaide Football Club in various off field capacities".

== Death ==
He died in South Australia on 16 June 1978.
