= Empey =

Empey is a surname. Notable people with the surname include:

- Arthur Guy Empey (1883–1963), American author, screenwriter and movie producer
- James Empey (born 1996), American football player
- Ralph Empey (1904–1960), Australian rules footballer
- Reg Empey (born 1947), Northern Ireland politician
- Walton Empey (born 1934), former Archbishop of Dublin
