= 1927 Brownlow Medal =

Victorian Football League player award

- Winner: Syd Coventry (Collingwood); 7 votes

The 1927 Brownlow Medal was the fourth year the award was presented to the player adjudged the fairest and best player during the Victorian Football League (VFL) home and away season. Syd Coventry of the Collingwood Football Club won the medal by polling seven votes during the 1927 VFL season.

== Leading votegetters ==
	Player	Votes
1st	Syd Coventry (Collingwood)	7
=2nd	Dick Taylor (Melbourne)	6
=2nd	Alex Duncan (Carlton)	6
=4th	Edward 'Carji' Greeves (Geelong)	5
=4th	Allan Geddes (Richmond)	5
=6th	George Jerram (Geelong)	3
=6th	Greg Stockdale (Essendon)	3
=6th	Austin Robertson Sr. (South Melbourne)	3
=6th	Leo Dwyer (North Melbourne)	3
=6th	Tom O'Halloran (Richmond)	3
=6th	Ernest Utting (Hawthorn)	3
