= Cyril Powell =

Australian rules footballer

Personal information
- Full name: Cyril Walter Powell
- Born: 5 March 1898; Carlton, Victoria
- Died: 5 February 1949 (aged 50); Parkville, Victoria
- Original team: Northcote / Preston
- Height: 178 cm (5 ft 10 in)
- Weight: 76 kg (168 lb)

Playing career^{1}
| Years | Club | Games (Goals) |
| 1927 | Richmond | 6 (0) |
| 1928–29 | South Melbourne | 20 (0) |
| Total | | 26 (0) |
- ^{1} Playing statistics correct to the end of 1929.

Cyril Walter "Pip" Powell (5 March 1898 – 5 February 1949) was a former Australian rules footballer who played with Northcote, and Geelong in the Victorian Football Association (VFA), and with Richmond and South Melbourne in the Victorian Football League (VFL).

== Family ==
The son of Walter Richard Powell, and Emma Harcourt Jane Powell, née Walker, Cyril Walter Powell was born at Carlton, Victoria on 5 March 1898.

He married Marie Frances Lucinda Josephine "Nance" Boustiere (1895-1975) in 1918.

His son, also Cyril Powell, played 184 senior games with Northcote in the VFA, and was the club's best and fairest in 1950.

== Cricket ==
A medium pace bowler, and a middle order batsman, he played First Grade District Cricket with Northcote Cricket Club: 63 matches in 16 seasons (1926/27 to 1942/43), scoring 1127 runs (highest score, 121 not out), and taking 27 wickets (best performance, 7 wickets).

== Football ==
Powell was a full back, a fine mark, and a good kick.

=== Northcote (VFA) ===
Recruited from Preston Juniors, he played 34 games and kicked 4 goals for Northcote in the VFA in two seasons (1922 to 1923).

=== Geelong (VFA) ===
He played 47 games and kicked 4 goals for Geelong (Association) in the VFA in three seasons (1924 to 1926).

=== Richmond (VFL) ===
Cleared from Geelong (Association) to Richmond on 27 April 1927, he played 10 Games and kicked 2 goals with the Richmond Second XVIII, and 6 games with the Richmond First XVIII in the 1927 season.

Powell made his VFL debut, against South Melbourne, on 11 June 1927, when he replaced the regular Richmond full-back, Donald Don, who was in Tasmania on business.

Don, playing for Victoria, dislocated his shoulder in the 15 August 1927 match against Tasmania at the 1927 Melbourne Carnival and was unable to play again for the rest of the season. Powell replaced Don at full-back for the remaining five games of the 1927 season, including the 1927 Grand Final.

== Death ==
He died at the Royal Melbourne Hospital on 5 February 1949.
