= Jack Fincher =

Jack Fincher may refer to:

- Jack Fincher (footballer), Australian rules footballer in the VFL
- Jack Fincher (screenwriter), served as chief editor of Life magazine
