= Jack Beveridge =

Australian rules footballer, born 1907

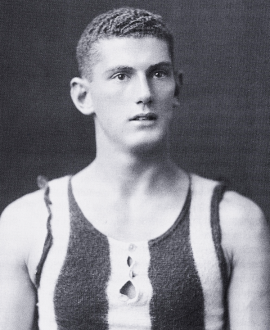

Personal information
- Full name: John Robert Beveridge
- Born: 8 May 1907; Collingwood, Victoria
- Died: 30 June 1986 (aged 79); Moorabbin Hospital, Bentleigh East, Victoria
- Height: 177 cm (5 ft 10 in)
- Weight: 77 kg (170 lb)

Playing career^{1}
Years	Club	Games (Goals)
1926–1934	Collingwood	148 (44)
1935–1936	West Perth	31 (20)
- ^{1} Playing statistics correct to the end of 1936.

Career highlights
- Collingwood premiership side 1927, 1928, 1929, 1930; West Perth premiership side 1935

John Robert Beveridge (8 May 1907 – 30 June 1986) was an Australian rules footballer who represented Collingwood in the Victorian Football League (VFL) and West Perth in the Western Australian National Football League (WANFL).

== Family ==
The son of Paul Robert Beveridge (1876–1943) and Catherine Mary Beveridge (1875–1961), née Prendeville, John Robert Beveridge was born at Collingwood, Victoria on 8 May 1907.

He married Mercia Griffiths Payne (1907–1986) in 1936.

Beveridge's grandson, Luke Beveridge, also played football at VFL/AFL level and currently coaches the Western Bulldogs who he coached to the 2016 AFL premiership.

== Football ==
Beveridge played as a centreman and was noted for his handballing skills. He finished equal seventh in the 1933 Brownlow Medal and was a member of the Collingwood side which won four premierships in a row under Jock McHale.

After leaving Collingwood he joined West Perth in the WANFL and helped them to win their second consecutive premiership.

In 1937 he moved to Tasmania and was captain-coach of Launceston, the club winning the NTFA premiership for the fifth consecutive season and also the State premiership for that season.

In 1938, Beveridge was captain-coach of Horsham and led them to the Wimmera Football League premiership.

== Death ==
He died at the Moorabbin Hospital in Bentleigh East, Victoria on 30 June 1986.
