= George Robinson (Australian footballer) =

Australian rules footballer, born 1901

Personal information
- Full name: George Robinson
- Born: 25 May 1901; Carlton, Victoria
- Died: 19 November 1962 (aged 61); South Melbourne, Victoria
- Original team: Nathalia
- Height: 173 cm (5 ft 8 in)
- Weight: 73 kg (161 lb)

Playing career^{1}
Years	Club	Games (Goals)
1925–27	Richmond	38 (16)
- ^{1} Playing statistics correct to the end of 1927.

George Robinson (25 May 1901 – 19 November 1962) was an Australian rules footballer who played with Richmond in the Victorian Football League (VFL).

Robinson was a regular in the Richmond team in 1925 and 1926, but lost selection in 1927, playing only three games for the season – two early season games, and the 1927 VFL grand final, for which he was called up on the day as a late replacement for the injured Jack Baggott.
