= Gordon Coventry =

Australian rules footballer (1901–1968)

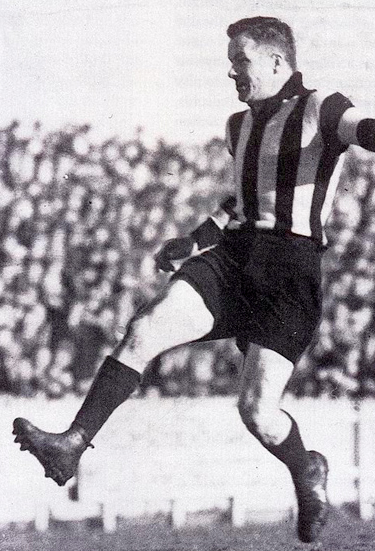
- Coventry in 1934

Personal information
- Full name: Gordon Richard James Coventry
- Nickname: Nuts
- Born: 25 September 1901; Diamond Creek, Victoria
- Died: 7 November 1968 (aged 67); Diamond Creek, Victoria
- Original team: Diamond Creek
- Height: 183 cm (6 ft 0 in)
- Weight: 85 kg (187 lb)
- Position: Full forward

Playing career^{1}
| Years | Club | Games (Goals) |
| 1920–1937 | Collingwood | 306 (1299) |

Representative team honours
| Years | Team | Games (Goals) |
| | Victoria | 25 (100) |
- ^{1} Playing statistics correct to the end of 1937.

Career highlights
- Club: 5× VFL Premiership player: (1927, 1928, 1929, 1930, 1935); 16× Collingwood Leading Goalkicker: (1922–1937); 6× Leading Goalkicker Medal (1926, 1927, 1928, 1929, 1930, 1933); Copeland Trophy: (1933); Honours: Australian Football Hall of Fame Legend; Collingwood Team of the Century; Collingwood Hall of Fame

Gordon Richard James Coventry (25 September 1901 – 7 November 1968) was an Australian rules footballer who played for Collingwood Football Club in the Victorian Football League (VFL).

Afforded 'Legend' status in the Australian Football Hall of Fame, Coventry was the first player in VFL history to achieve several significant milestones, including playing 300 career games, kicking 100 goals in a season, winning the leading goalkicker award in five consecutive years, and kicking 1000 career goals. Coventry's league total of 1299 career goals served as a competition record for over 60 seasons.

== Early life ==
The eighth of the ten children of Henry Coventry (1862–1948) and Jane Henrietta Coventry (1863–1940), née Spencer, Gordon Richard James Coventry—known as "Nuts" to his family (said, by some, due to his having a disproportionately large head as a child)—was born on 25 September 1901 in Diamond Creek, Victoria.

Coventry and his siblings attended the Nillumbik State School (No.1003) at Diamond Creek. While still at school, he began working on his father's fruit orchard.

== Football career ==
=== Diamond Creek (pre-1920) ===
Coventry played his early football for Diamond Creek Football Club in the new Heidelberg District Football League, a competition which began after World War I, and had quickly established himself as a champion centre half-forward. In 1920, he was invited to train at Collingwood. The three significant officials involved with that invitation, who were anticipating Collingwood's need to find a suitable replacement for the at-the-time injured Dick Lee, who was nearing the end of his career, were Ernest William Copeland (1868–1947), John James "Jack" Joyce (1860–1945), and John James "Jack" Peppard (1878–1940). Although Lee had played in Collingwood's first eight matches in the 1920 season, he had only scored 17 goals; and, also, due to an injury sustained in the round 9 match against South Melbourne, he missed the next seven matches, returning in the season's last home-and-away match in round 18—in the interim, Collingwood tried various permutations of forward lines to cover for the loss of Lee, centred on the selection of Ern Utting (five matches), Tom Wraith (one match), and Tom Drummond (one match) at full-forward over that time.

=== Collingwood (1920–1937) ===
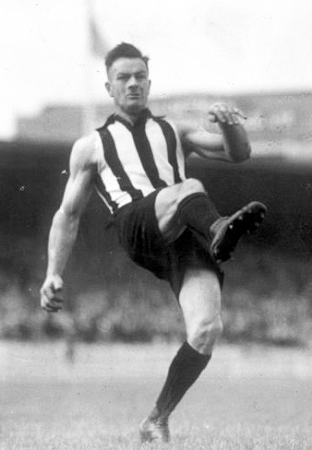
Gordon Coventry, at Victoria Park (date unknown).

==== First season (1920) ====
Coventry played his first senior game for Collingwood at the age of 18 against St Kilda in round 15, 1920. He played on the half-forward flank, kicked one goal, and although "not particularly impressive … [he] showed that he can kick well". As one of Collingwood's four inexperienced players given a run that day (the others were Les Lobb, Len Ludbrooke, and Roy Outram), Gordon played his second match—again on the half-forward flank—in what was also Lee's return match, the last home-and-away round of the season against South Melbourne.

Then, just 18, and in his third match, Gordon played at centre half-forward in the Collingwood team (with Lee at full-forward) that beat Fitzroy 4.17 (41) to 3.5 (23), at a muddy, rain-sodden MCG, in the 1920 semi-final . And then, once more at centre half-forward (with Harry Curtis replacing the injured Lee at full-forward), in the Collingwood team that beat Carlton 12.11 (83) to 8.11 (59) in the 1920 preliminary final on 25 September 1920, his nineteenth birthday. Coventry reprised his role at centre half-forward in the team that lost to Richmond 7.10 (52) to 5.5 (35) in the 1920 grand final, kicking 3 goals in the defeat.

==== A role at half-forward (1921–1922) ====
In 1921, his second VFL season, Coventry was selected in a representative VFL side to play against a combined Bendigo team on 6 August 1921, but did not play due to influenza.

He was unable to play in the last home-and-away rounds of the 1921 season due to his illness, although he was able to resume training.

Unexpectedly, he was selected as a last minute replacement for Mal Seddon, who had declared himself unfit to play on the morning of the match, as a consequence of the injury to his thigh that he had sustained at the preceding Tuesday's training session in a collision with Percy Rowe. Coventry played at centre half-forward (kicking 3 goals) in the team that lost to Carlton 9.11 (65) to 7.10 (52) in the 1921 semi-final.

Coventry played the entire 1922 season on one half-forward flank, scoring 42 goals, with his brother, Syd, playing on the other.

==== The switch to full-forward (1923–1935) ====
In 1923, with Lee having retired at the end of the 1922 season, Coventry (by this stage a 34-game veteran) moved to full-forward and was the club's leading goal-kicker that season with 36 goals. He soon became one of the league's most prolific and consistent goal-kickers. He was Collingwood's leading goal-kicker for 16 consecutive years, and the league's leading goal-kicker on six occasions (five of which were in consecutive years, 1927–1931). He kicked Collingwood's only two goals in the lowest-scores-ever grand final of 1927, with Collingwood, in atrocious conditions, defeating Richmond 2.13 (25) to 1.7 (13). He was the first player to kick 100 goals in a VFL season (which he did in 1929, 1930, 1933, and 1934), kicked a total of 1299 goals in VFL football, and 100 goals in VFL representative teams. Coventry was made a life member of the Collingwood Football Club in 1932, and was also Collingwood's best and fairest player in 1933.

==== A shock suspension; retirement (1936–1937) ====
Coventry missed Collingwood's 1936 VFL grand final victory due to disqualification. It was the only time he had been reported in his entire VFL career. Coventry was found guilty of striking Richmond defender Joe Murdoch in the torrid match against Richmond in round 13, 1936. Coventry had a crop of painful boils on his neck, and when Murdoch repeatedly struck his neck, Coventry retaliated.

Coventry was suspended for eight matches, and Murdoch for four. An appeal by Coventry against the severity of the penalty was unsuccessful. At the time, Coventry announced that he was retiring from VFL football. He later relented, and, having served the eighth and last match of his suspension in the first week of the 1937 season, he played in 19 matches and kicked 72 goals in 1937, his final VFL season.

== Playing style ==
Although a very reliable right-foot kick, Coventry was equally able to use his left foot accurately and effectively when needed – see, for example, his left-foot goal under pressure for Victoria at the Sydney Cricket Ground in the 7 August 1933 match against South Australia during the 1933 ANFC Carnival.

The "broad-backed and sticky-fingered" Coventry did not possess the phenomenal skills of his predecessor at Collingwood, Dick Lee, or the aerial prowess of his successor, Ron Todd, but relied on tremendous strength and a vice-like grip when marking the ball, a combination that made him almost unstoppable once he had front position.

"Once [Gordon "Nuts"] Coventry gets in front it seems that no defender can get round him.
His bulky body and his awkward gait seem to brook no interruption, and he never seems to drop a mark."

== Records ==
External images
- Caricatures and Cartoons
- Gordon Coventry, in The Herald, 14 August 1925.
- G. Coventry, in Table Talk, 25 August 1927.
- G. Coventry, in The Herald, 30 April 1928.
- G. Coventry, in Table Talk, 30 August 1928.
- "Nuts" Coventry, in The Herald, 2 August 1929.
- Gordon Coventry, in The Referee, 30 July 1930.
- Gordon Coventry, in The Herald, 28 May 1934.
- Gordon ("Nuts") Coventry, in The Age, 30 July 1937.
- Gordon Coventry, in The Age, 27 September 1937.

Coventry retired after the 1937 season, the first player to play 300 VFL/AFL games, winning his sixth league leading goal-kicker award, and his 16th consecutive club leading goal-kicker award, a club record and five clear of Australian Football Legend and Collingwood predecessor Dick Lee. Coventry also represented Victoria on 25 occasions for a total of 100 goals.

Coventry played in 31 finals matches in his 18-year career, including the drawn Semi-Final match against Melbourne on 15 September 1928 (the first drawn finals match in VFL history), and 10 grand finals, five of which were won by Collingwood (1927–1930, and 1935). In the 1928 VFL grand final he kicked a league record 9 goals, in a match in which Collingwood beat Richmond 13.18 (96) to 9.9 (63).

He was the first player to kick 100 goals in a VFL season (which he did in 1929, 1930, 1933, and 1934), and he kicked a total of 1299 goals in VFL football: a record that stood for more than six decades until it was broken by Sydney Swans player Tony Lockett in the match against Coventry's former club, Collingwood, on 6 June 1999.

His tallies included:

- 9 goals in a Grand Final: against Richmond, in the Grand Final, on 29 September 1928.
  - An unbeaten Grand Final record, only equalled on one occasion: by Gary Ablett Sr., against Hawthorn, in the Grand Final, on 30 September 1989.
- 10 goals in a match: against North Melbourne on 24 August 1929, and against Melbourne on 2 September 1933.
- 11 goals in a match: against Footscray on 19 June 1926, against Fitzroy on 28 May 1927, against St Kilda on 11 June 1927, against South Melbourne on 11 May 1929, and against St Kilda on 5 September 1931.
- 14 goals in a match: against Hawthorn on 18 August 1934.
- 15 goals in a match: against Essendon on 8 July 1933.
- 16 goals in a match: against Hawthorn on 27 July 1929.
  - This broke the previous league record of 14 goals, set by South Melbourne's Harold Robertson ten years earlier in the match against St Kilda on 26 July 1919.
  - Coventry's brother Syd also kicked 1 goal in this match making their combined tally of 17 goals the highest by a pair of siblings in VFL/AFL history.
- 17 goals in a match: against Fitzroy on 19 July 1930.
  - A league record at the time, Gordon Coventry's record score of 17 goals in a single match – 17.4 (106) – has only ever been broken once, by Melbourne's Fred Fanning, who kicked 18.1 (109) in his last-ever VFL match against St Kilda on 30 August 1947; and, also, has only ever been equalled once, by Hawthorn's Jason Dunstall, who kicked 17.5 (107) against Richmond on 2 May 1992.
- 97 goals in a season: 1927.
- 105 goals in a season: 1934.
- 108 goals in a season: 1933.
- 118 goals in a season: 1930.
- 124 goals in a season: 1929.
  - 1929 was the first time that any VFL player had scored 100 goals or more in a single season.

== Coaching career ==
After leaving Collingwood, Coventry coached Collegians in the VAFA for a number of years.

== Personal life ==
Coventry married Christabel Violet Lawrey on 28 February 1925. They had four children: two sons, George Gordon (b.1925) and Graham (b.1945), and two daughters, Betty Lois (b.1928), later Mrs. Alexander David Denney, and Margaret Shirley (1930–2006), later Mrs. Charles James Banks.

Three of Coventry's brothers served in the First AIF: John Thomas "Jack" Coventry, Hugh Norman "Oak" Coventry, who was (posthumously) mentioned in dispatches for "gallant devotion to duty as volunteer stretcher bearer, carrying the wounded" on 9 August 1916, and had been killed in action while serving with the First AIF in Pozieres, and Thomas Coventry, who was wounded in the arm and foot in action in France in 1916.

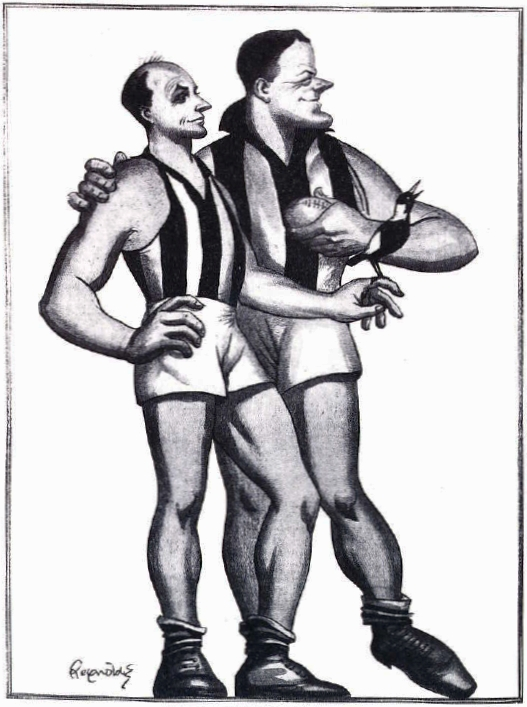
"The Coventrys of Collingwood" (L: Syd; R: Gordon) Len Reynolds, Table Talk, 9 October 1930.

Another older brother, Sydney Andrew Coventry (1899–1976), also played for Collingwood at the same time as Gordon.

While working as a miner at Queenstown, Tasmania, and playing football for the Miners' Football Team (as its captain), in Gormanston, Tasmania, in 1920, Syd was approached by St Kilda and invited to play for them in 1921. Syd moved to Victoria, and influenced by Gordon, began training with Collingwood (rather than St Kilda) in the 1921 pre-season; however, in May 1921, "an application by S.A. Coventry for transfer from Miners' (Tasmania) to Collingwood was refused [by the Victorian Football League Permit Committee]".

Having served 12 months out of football, Syd was cleared "from Tasmania to Collingwood" on 26 April 1922. He went on play in 227 VFL games for Collingwood (1922–1934) and 27 representative games for the VFL (1922–1934), captain Collingwood for 144 games (1927–1934), win the Brownlow Medal in 1927, and serve for three years as the non-playing coach of Footscray (1935–1937) before returning to Collingwood as an administrator, serving as its vice-president for 11 years (1939–1949), its president for 13 years (1950–1962), and its patron from 1963 until his death in 1976.

== Death ==
Coventry died of heart disease on 7 November 1968 at his property in Diamond Creek, survived by his wife and four children.

== Legacy ==
In 1996, Coventry was an inaugural inductee of the Australian Football Hall of Fame and was elevated to "Legend" status (as the fourteenth "Legend") two years later.

In 1998, he was named at full-forward in Collingwood's "Team of the Century".

On 24 November 1999, he was inducted into the Sport Australia Hall of Fame.

In 2009, The Australian nominated Coventry as one of the 25 greatest footballers never to win a Brownlow Medal.

The Gordon Coventry Trophy is awarded to Collingwood's leading goalkicker each year. The southern end of the Docklands Stadium is named the "Coventry end". When the Southern Stand at the MCG was built, a gate/entrance was jointly named after Coventry and brother Syd.

== See also ==
- List of Australian rules football families
- 1927 Melbourne Carnival
- Collingwood Team of the Century
