= Norm MacLeod =

Australian rules footballer, born 1904

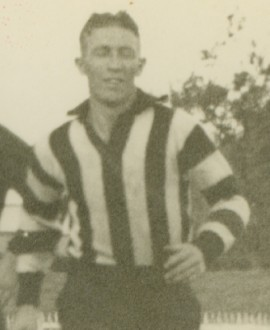
- MacLeod during his Collingwood career

Personal information
- Full name: Norman J. MacLeod
- Born: 8 October 1904
- Died: 7 October 1951 (aged 46)
- Original team: Northcote District
- Height: 170 cm (5 ft 7 in)
- Weight: 64 kg (141 lb)
- Position: Winger

Playing career^{1}
Years	Club	Games (Goals)
1927–1932	Collingwood	58 (0)
- ^{1} Playing statistics correct to the end of 1932.

Norman J. MacLeod (8 October 1904 - 7 October 1951) was an Australian rules footballer who played for Collingwood in the Victorian Football League (VFL) during the late 1920s and early 1930s.

MacLeod, a wingman, appeared in the opening three rounds of the 1927 VFL season but didn't play another game after that until the following year. In just his 18th league game, MacLeod became a premiership player when he was a member of the Collingwood side which defeated Richmond in the 1928 Grand Final.
