= Harry Collier =

Australian rules footballer

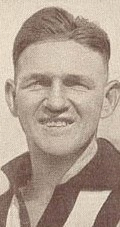

Personal information
- Full name: Harry Collier
- Born: 1 October 1907; Collingwood, Victoria
- Died: 16 August 1994 (aged 86)
- Height: 173 cm (5 ft 8 in)
- Weight: 72 kg (159 lb)

Playing career^{1}
Years	Club	Games (Goals)
1926–1940	Collingwood	253 (299)

Representative team honours
Years	Team	Games (Goals)
	Victoria	12 (1)
- ^{1} Playing statistics correct to the end of 1940.

Career highlights
- Collingwood premiership player 1927, 1928, 1929, 1930; Collingwood premiership captain 1935, 1936; Collingwood Team of the Century; Copeland Trophy 1928, 1930; Collingwood captain 1935–1939

Harry Collier (1 October 1907 – 16 August 1994) was an Australian rules footballer in the Victorian Football League.

== Playing career ==
Originally from Ivanhoe, Victoria, Collier played for the Collingwood Football Club, debuting in 1926. Collier was a player in Collingwood's legendary premiership sides from 1927–1930, the only side to have won four premierships in a row in the entire history of the VFL/AFL.

He was appointed captain in 1935, a position which he held until 1939. During this period, his team won two premierships (in 1935 and 1936), and finished runners-up in the other three years he was captain. He was said to be Collingwood's best player during the era, taking out the club best and fairest award in 1928 and 1930. Collier retired in 1940 after only one game for the season, his career record standing at 253 games and 299 goals with the Magpies.

=== Honours ===
Collier was retrospectively rewarded a Brownlow Medal after originally tying for the 1930 award where Collier, Stan Judkins and Allan Hopkins all finished with an equal number of votes. The Umpires Board (which administered the award) recommended that no medal be awarded as there were inconsistent provisions within the rules for the event of a tie. Significantly, among three informal votes cast during the year, one vote from a Collingwood game was simply labelled "Collier", but as there were two Collier brothers playing in the game, the vote was not counted. The VFL board ultimately overruled the umpires board, and used the criterion that stated the medal be awarded to the player who polled the highest percentage of votes against games played to award the medal to Judkins. To avoid situations like this in the future, the rules were altered to a 3-2-1 system in 1931. In 1989, the VFL retrospectively eliminated the countbacks from all tied Brownlow Medal results, and Hopkins and Collier, while both still living, were awarded joint 1930 Brownlow Medals.

Other honours include Collier's posthumous induction into Collingwood's Team of the Century and, in 1996, induction into the Australian Football Hall of Fame.

== Post-playing career ==
Following his playing career, Collier coached the Essendon reserves to a premiership in 1941. He later became a committeeman for Collingwood.

Collier was also a noted television personality during the time of Australia's first year of broadcasting in 1956 and subsequent years.

== Personal life ==
Collier was the older brother of former champion Collingwood player (and 1929 Brownlow Medal winner) Albert.

== Death ==
Collier died in 1994.
