= Joe Murdoch =

Australian rules footballer

Personal information
- Born: 30 October 1908; Castlemaine, Victoria
- Died: 26 December 2002 (aged 94)
- Original team: Brighton Street School / Burnley Church of Christ
- Debut: 28 May 1927, Richmond vs. North Melbourne, at Arden Street
- Height: 183 cm (6 ft 0 in)
- Weight: 81.5 kg (180 lb)

Playing career^{1}
Years	Club	Games (Goals)
1927–1936	Richmond	180 (6)
- ^{1} Playing statistics correct to the end of 1936.

Career highlights
- Richmond Premiership Player 1932, 1934; Interstate Games:- 1; Richmond Hall of Fame Inductee: 2011; Castlemaine DFA Premiership captain-coach: 1941, 1944

Arthur "Joe" Murdoch (30 October 1908 – 26 December 2002) was an Australian rules footballer who played in the VFL in between 1927 and 1936 for the Richmond Football Club.

Murdoch was widely regarded as an tough defender who was at the forefront of an exceptional backline that held the South Melbourne and Collingwood attacks numerous times in important matches during the 1930s. For his size, Murdoch was widely regarded as had exceptionally good ground skills, and would always use his strength to his advantage.

He was capable of playing in any position on the backline, for most of his career fitting in as required to accommodate other defenders such as Maurie Sheahan, Martin Bolger and Basil McCormack. He played in the losing 1928 VFL Grand Final side and in the 1932 VFL premiership side as a centre-half-back, whilst in the losing 1929 VFL grand final side Murdoch was on the half-back flank and in the 1931 VFL grand final, Murdoch played at full-back. By the time of the 1934 VFL premiership side Richmond were so well-equipped with top defenders that Murdoch was moved to the forward line where he kicked a goal – despite having between Rounds Nine and Fourteen of that season held the VFL record for most games without kicking a goal.

Murdoch was reported in round 13, 1936, when he was involved in a fight with Collingwood legend Gordon Coventry. Though Coventry was judged the instigator of the conflict and was suspended for eight weeks, Murdoch was on Tuesday 4 August found guilty of retaliating and suspended for four matches. Murdoch returned to the seniors for Richmond's last match in round 18, then in 1937 he returned to his home town of Castlemaine, as captain-coach.

Murdoch was captain-coach of Castlemaine in the Castlemaine District Football Association in 1937, 1940, 1941, 1944 and 1945, winning premierships in 1941 and 1944 and played with Castlemaine from 1937 to 1949.

In 1939, Murdoch played several matches for Maryborough in the Ballarat Football League under a special day permit.

== Links ==
- Joe Murdoch player profile via Tigerland Archive
