= Don Harris (Australian footballer) =

Australian rules footballer, born 1905

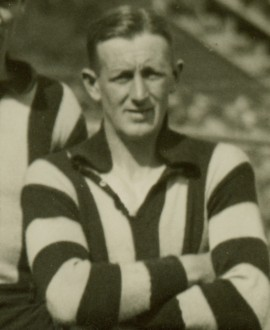
- Harris in 1931

Personal information
- Full name: Donald Harris
- Born: 27 June 1905; Corindhap, Victoria
- Died: 11 August 1979 (aged 74); Melbourne, Victoria
- Original team: Burnley
- Height: 174 cm (5 ft 9 in)
- Weight: 72 kg (159 lb)

Playing career^{1}
Years	Club	Games (Goals)
1926–1930	Richmond	64 (5)
1931–1932	Collingwood	32 (3)
Total		96 (8)
- ^{1} Playing statistics correct to the end of 1932.

Donald Harris (27 June 1905 – 11 August 1979) was an Australian rules footballer who played with Richmond and Collingwood in the Victorian Football League (VFL).

Harris, a defender, played in three successive grand finals for Richmond but was never a member of a premiership team. The Burnley recruit was a back pocket in the 1926, 1927 and 1928 VFL Grand Finals.

He spent the last two seasons of his league career at Collingwood. His seven votes in the 1932 Brownlow Medal were bettered by only one teammate, Syd Coventry. The year ended with a preliminary final loss and he then retired for business reasons. He however continued participating in amateur football, as the playing coach of Kew in the Sub-District Football Association.
