= Jock McHale =

Australian rules footballer

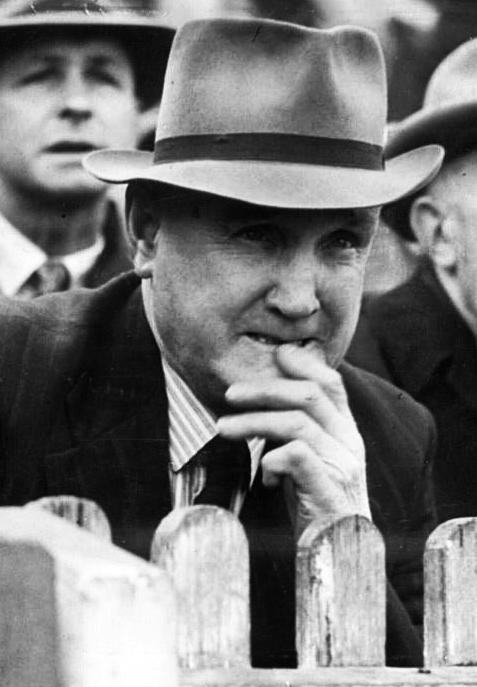

Personal information
- Full name: James Francis McHale
- Born: 12 December 1882; Botany, New South Wales
- Died: 4 October 1953 (aged 70); Coburg, Victoria
- Original teams: Christian Brothers College; East Melbourne; Coburg Juniors
- Height: 180 cm (5 ft 11 in)
- Weight: 78 kg (172 lb)

Playing career^{1}
Years	Club	Games (Goals)
1903–1920	Collingwood	261 (18)

Coaching career^{3}
Years	Club	Games (W–L–D)
1912–1949	Collingwood	714 (467–237–10)
- ^{1} Playing statistics correct to the end of 1920.^{3} Coaching statistics correct as of 1949.

Career highlights
- Collingwood premiership player 1910; Collingwood premiership playing coach 1917; Collingwood premiership coach; 1919, 1927, 1928, 1929, 1930, 1935, 1936; Australian Football Hall of Fame, "Legend"; Collingwood Team of the Century, coach; Collingwood captain 1912–1913; AFLCA Coaching Legend Award: 2013

James Francis "Jock" McHale (12 December 1882 – 4 October 1953) was an Australian rules football player and coach for the Collingwood Football Club in the Victorian Football League in a marathon career that extended from 1903 to 1949. He is the most successful VFL/AFL coach of all time, having led Collingwood to a record eight premierships.

== Early life ==
The son of an Irish-born policeman, John Francis, and his wife Mary (née Gibbons), James Francis McHale was born in Botany, New South Wales, but moved to Melbourne with his family at age 5. He attended St Brigid's primary school in North Fitzroy and St Paul's in Coburg, then moved on to Christian Brothers' College (Parade College) in East Melbourne and completed three years of secondary school. Having just turned 15, he left school to take a position with the McCracken Brewery.

== Playing career ==
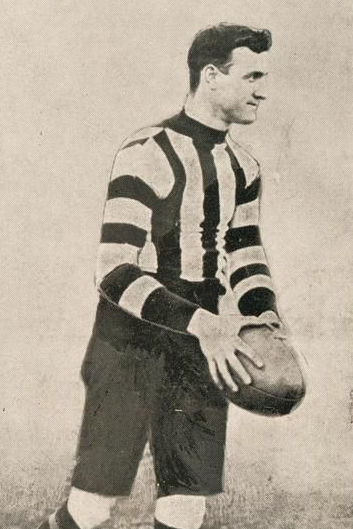
McHale during his playing days in 1910

McHale joined Coburg, at the time a junior club, and came to prominence with his consistency, which led to an invitation to play at Collingwood. McHale made his league debut in 1903 for Collingwood, playing as a half-back before moving into the centre. Durability was the cornerstone of his reputation as a player—he set a VFL record by playing 191 games consecutively between 1906 and 1917. This record was not beaten in the VFL until 1943 by Richmond's Jack Titus, and was beaten at club level only in 2023, when Jack Crisp made his 192nd consecutive appearance.

McHale served as captain-coach from 1912–1913 and as a playing coach from 1914 up to the 1917 premiership, his second premiership after being part of the 1910 premiership side. McHale played a handful of matches in 1918 and 1920, but from 1918 to 1949 he made his name as the most successful coach in VFL/AFL history, deeds for which he is best remembered. As a player, McHale played 261 games and kicked 18 goals, including being the League's first player to hit the 250-game milestone, as well as representing Victoria.

== Coaching career ==
In total, McHale coached 714 VFL games with 467 wins and 10 draws (a 66.1% winning rate). This included a record 59 finals matches and 16 grand finals for eight premierships. His tally of 714 games was the record for most VFL/AFL games coached until 2015, when it was passed by Footscray, West Coast, Collingwood and Carlton coach Mick Malthouse. Stylistically, McHale was regarded more for his analytics and ability to inspire, rather than as a teacher of skills. His football brain earned him the respect of his players and the football public. His stint as coach encompassed three enormously successful eras: 1917–1922 (five grand finals in six years for two flags), then 1925–1930 (six successive grand finals for four flags) and finally 1935–1939 (five successive grand finals for two flags).

The strength of Collingwood under McHale lay in its evenness and adherence to team discipline. McHale fashioned the team as a machine, with no part bigger than the whole – he and his players accepted the same amount of pay every week. He placed great store in his own ability to pick players' strengths and fitness levels and he would assess his players each week during a traditional Thursday night match-day type training. Although in the years before and after the war, Collingwood earned a reputation for failing in tough finals matches, McHale's reputation is assured for guiding the club in achieving football's greatest single feat: the unequalled record of four premierships in a row, set between 1927 and 1930.

During the war, Collingwood fell on its first barren period since the formation of the club in 1892. McHale rode out the privations of the period and the Magpies re-emerged as a contender in 1945. However, the club suffered a series of disappointing finals losses, and McHale conceded to age early in 1950 and retired. He stayed intimately involved with the club and helped plan the Magpies' successful campaign in the 1953 Grand Final. When Collingwood won the match to end a premiership drought of 17 years, McHale was overwhelmed with emotion. The next day he suffered a heart attack, and he died on 4 October at his home in Coburg. Noted Collingwood benefactor John Wren suffered a heart attack while watching the same grand final match, and he died on 26 October 1953.

=== Coaching statistics ===
Legend
W	Wins	L	Losses	D	Draws	W%	Winning percentage	LP	Ladder position	LT	League teams

Season	Team	Games	W	L	D	W %	LP	LT
1912	Collingwood	18	9	9	0	50.0%	7	10
1913	Collingwood	19	13	6	0	68.4%	3	10
1914	Collingwood	18	10	7	1	58.3%	5	10
1915	Collingwood	18	14	4	0	77.8%	1	9
1916	Collingwood	13	6	6	1	50.0%	2	4
1917	Collingwood	16	12	5	1	69.4%	1	6
1918	Collingwood	16	11	5	0	68.8%	2	8
1919	Collingwood	19	15	4	0	80.0%	1	9
1920	Collingwood	19	12	7	0	63.2%	4	9
1921	Collingwood	17	9	8	0	52.9%	3	9
1922	Collingwood	18	12	6	0	66.7%	1	9
1923	Collingwood	16	8	7	1	53.1%	5	9
1924	Collingwood	16	8	8	0	50.0%	6	9
1925	Collingwood	20	14	6	0	70.0%	4	12
1926	Collingwood	20	15	5	0	75.0%	1	12
1927	Collingwood	20	17	3	0	85.0%	1	12
1928	Collingwood	21	17	3	1	83.3%	1	12
1929	Collingwood	20	19	1	0	95.0%	1	12
1930	Collingwood	20	16	4	0	80.0%	1	12
1931	Collingwood	19	12	7	0	63.2%	4	12
1932	Collingwood	20	15	5	0	75.0%	3	12
1933	Collingwood	18	11	7	0	61.1%	6	12
1934	Collingwood	19	13	5	1	71.1%	4	12
1935	Collingwood	21	16	3	2	81.0%	2	12
1936	Collingwood	20	17	3	0	85.0%	2	12
1937	Collingwood	21	15	6	0	71.4%	3	12
1938	Collingwood	21	14	7	0	66.7%	4	12
1939	Collingwood	21	16	5	0	76.2%	2	12
1940	Collingwood	18	8	10	0	44.4%	8	12
1941	Collingwood	18	12	6	0	66.7%	5	12
1942	Collingwood	14	2	12	0	14.3%	10	11
1943	Collingwood	15	5	10	0	33.3%	10	11
1944	Collingwood	18	7	11	0	38.9%	10	12
1945	Collingwood	22	15	7	0	68.2%	2	12
1946	Collingwood	22	13	8	1	61.4%	2	12
1947	Collingwood	19	11	7	1	60.5%	5	12
1948	Collingwood	21	14	7	0	66.7%	3	12
1949	Collingwood	20	13	7	0	65.0%	3	12
Career totals		713	466	237	10	66.1%		

== Recognition ==
In 1996, Jock McHale was inducted into the Australian Football Hall of Fame, and was elevated to Legend status in 2005.

Since 2001, the premiership coach is awarded the Jock McHale Medal, in honour of McHale's brilliant coaching record. The AFL has retrospectively made this award to each premiership coach since 1950, the year after McHale retired as a coach.

Crime novelist Kerry Greenwood wrote the 1991 short story The Vanishing of Jock McHale's Hat. It was adapted into a season 2 episode of Miss Fisher's Murder Mysteries, titled "Marked for Murder", which aired in 2013.

=== 1930 grand final ===
The AFL officially recognises McHale as having coached 714 games and eight premierships, but it is a matter of some historical controversy that the 1930 VFL grand final and premiership are credited to McHale's statistics. McHale had coached the team throughout that year and into the week of the grand final, but he was absent on the day of the match, having fallen ill with influenza days before the game. Club treasurer Bob Rush performed the match-day coaching duties in his place. For many years, Rush was credited with having coached the game; but, after a decision in 2014 by the AFL's historians, McHale is now credited as Collingwood's sole coach in the game.

== Death ==
McHale died of a heart attack on 4 October 1953, aged 70, at his home in Coburg, only a week after Collingwood had won its first premiership in seventeen years. He is buried with his wife Violet, son James, and daughter Mary at Coburg Cemetery in Preston, Victoria. His grave is included in a self-guided heritage walk at the cemetery, and information about his life is available on a sign posted at his graveside.
