= Hope Collins =

Australian rules footballer, born 1904

Personal information
- Full name: Hope Henry Collins
- Born: 20 August 1904; Carisbrook, Victoria
- Died: 1 April 1980 (aged 75); Ballarat, Victoria
- Original team: Nathalia (GVFA)
- Height: 183 cm (6 ft 0 in)
- Weight: 76 kg (168 lb)

Playing career^{1}
Years	Club	Games (Goals)
1930	Richmond	1 (1)
1931–32	Camberwell (VFA)	34 (28)
- ^{1} Playing statistics correct to the end of 1930.

Hope Henry Collins (20 August 1904 – 1 April 1980) was an Australian rules footballer who played with Richmond in the Victorian Football League (VFL).

His sole VFL match was in Round 1, 1930. He was injured during the third quarter, and substituted off for Ralph Empey at three quarter time, in what was the first 19th man substitution in VFL history following the introduction of the rule that year.
