= Fred Goding =

Australian rules footballer, born 1905

Personal information
- Full name: Frederick Arthur Goding
- Born: 26 February 1905; Oakleigh, Victoria
- Died: 12 January 1981 (aged 75); Glen Iris, Victoria
- Original team: Oakleigh
- Height: 168 cm (5 ft 6 in)
- Weight: 67 kg (148 lb)

Playing career^{1}
Years	Club	Games (Goals)
1928	Richmond	9 (9)
- ^{1} Playing statistics correct to the end of 1928.

Frederick Arthur Goding (26 February 1905 – 12 January 1981) was an Australian rules footballer who played with Richmond in the Victorian Football League (VFL).

Originally from Oakleigh, Goding played in the Melbourne seconds, before arriving at Richmond. He appeared at the 1928 VFL Grand Final in the forward pocket.
