= Les Gallagher =

Australian rules footballer, born 1904

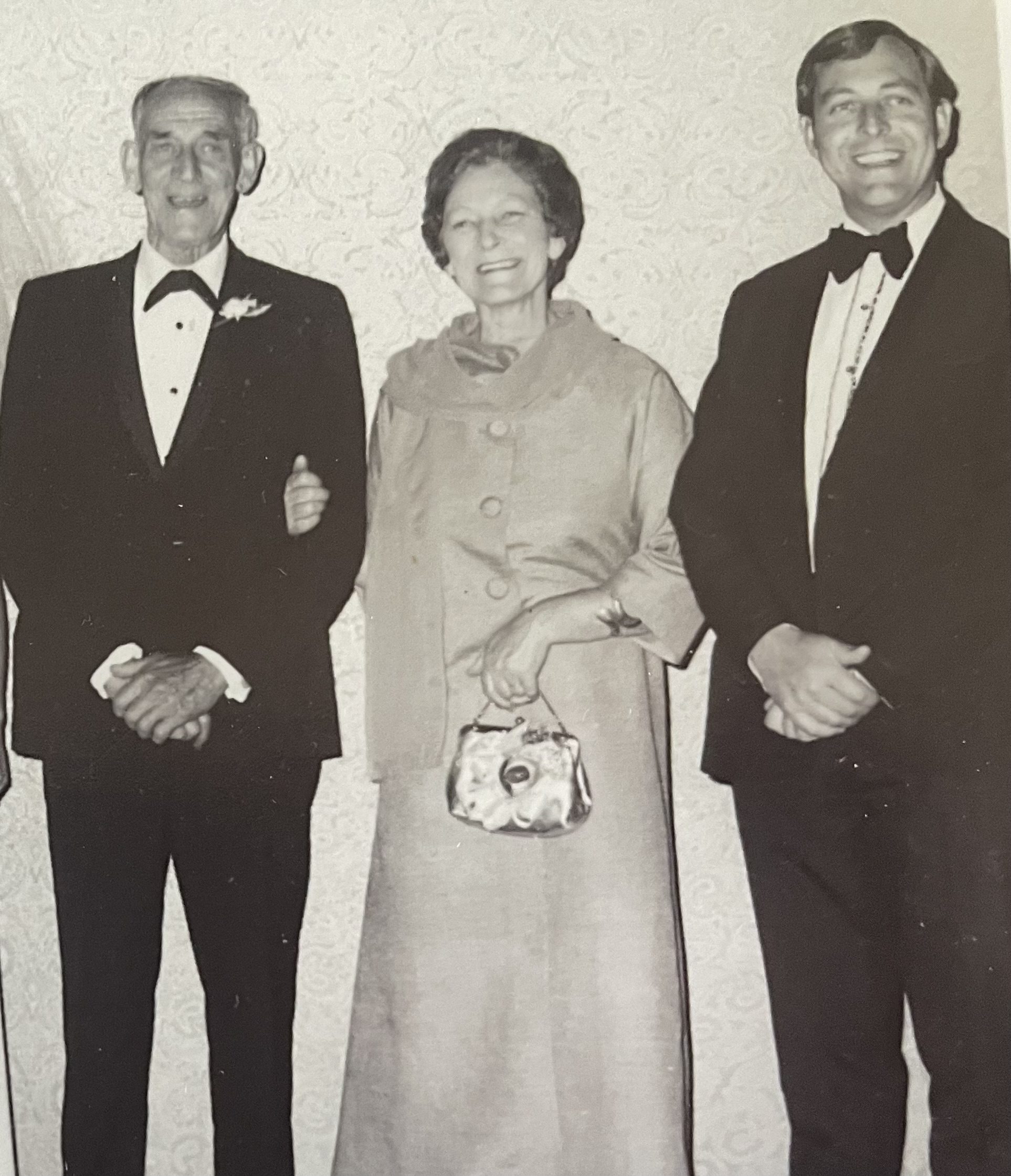
- Les Gallagher with wife Edna and son John

Personal information
- Full name: Alexander Leslie Gallagher
- Born: 10 July 1904; Warragul, Victoria
- Died: 25 August 1973 (aged 69); Warrnambool, Victoria
- Original team: Elsternwick
- Height: 179 cm (5 ft 10 in)
- Weight: 72 kg (159 lb)

Playing career^{1}
Years	Club	Games (Goals)
1924–1925	St Kilda	9 (14)
1926–1929	Richmond	62 (27)
Total		71 (41)
- ^{1} Playing statistics correct to the end of 1929.

Alexander Leslie Gallagher (10 July 1904 – 25 August 1973) was an Australian rules footballer who played with St Kilda and Richmond in the Victorian Football League (VFL).

== Family ==
The son of John Gallagher (1850-1935), and Georgina Barbara Gallagher (1862-1933), née Ridgewell, Alexander Leslie Gallagher was born at Warragul on 10 July 1904.

He married Edna Lillian Turland (1910-1971) in 1936.

He had 4 Children with Edna, John Leslie (born 31/10/1937 - 28/02/2022), Keith, Bruce and Ruth.

His cousin, Norman Henry John "Harry" Weidner (1907-1962), also played VFL football for Richmond.

== Football ==
=== St Kilda (VFL) ===
Gallagher was from Elsternwick originally and spent his first two league seasons at St Kilda, as a forward. He kicked five goals against South Melbourne in just his second VFL appearance.

=== Richmond (VFL) ===
With Richmond he was used as a centreman and played in both the 1927 VFL Grand Final and 1928 VFL Grand Finals. He finished on the losing team on each occasion.

=== Brighton (VFA) ===
He was cleared from Richmond to Brighton on 23 April 1930.

=== Warrnambool (WDFL) ===
In April 1931, on the grounds that he had been offered the position of captain-coach, he was granted a clearance from Brighton to Warrnambool Football Club in the Western District Football League.

== Death ==
He died at Warrnambool on 25 August 1973.
