= Les Lobb =

Australian rules footballer

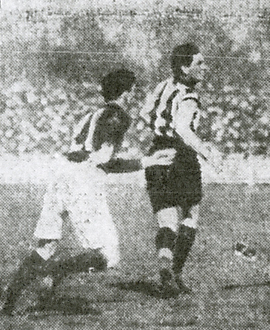
- Lobb (right) in 1920

Personal information
- Full name: Leslie Charles Lobb
- Born: 5 September 1894; Surrey Hills, Victoria
- Died: 3 March 1970 (aged 75); Box Hill, Victoria
- Original team: Canterbury
- Height: 180 cm (5 ft 11 in)
- Weight: 81 kg (179 lb)

Playing career^{1}
Years	Club	Games (Goals)
1920	Collingwood	5 (0)
- ^{1} Playing statistics correct to the end of 1920.

Leslie Charles Lobb (5 September 1894 – 3 March 1970) was an Australian rules footballer who played with Collingwood in the Victorian Football League (VFL).
