= Doug Hayes =

Australian rules footballer

Personal information
- Full name: Douglas Leo Hayes
- Born: 16 September 1896; Richmond, Victoria
- Died: 5 June 1985 (aged 88); Hampton, Victoria
- Original team: Camberwell
- Height: 163 cm (5 ft 4 in)
- Weight: 60 kg (132 lb)
- Position: Rover

Playing career^{1}
Years	Club	Games (Goals)
1922–28	Richmond	82 (62)
- ^{1} Playing statistics correct to the end of 1928.

Douglas Leo Hayes (16 September 1896 – 5 June 1985) was an Australian rules footballer who played with Richmond in the Victorian Football League (VFL).
