= Frank O'Brien (footballer) =

Australian rules footballer, born 1900

Personal information
- Full name: Frank O'Brien
- Born: 2 May 1900
- Died: 14 November 1986 (aged 86)
- Height: 173 cm (5 ft 8 in)
- Weight: 73 kg (161 lb)

Playing career^{1}
Years	Club	Games (Goals)
1926–28	Richmond	23 (5)
- ^{1} Playing statistics correct to the end of 1928.

Frank O'Brien (2 May 1900 – 14 November 1986) was a former Australian rules footballer who played with Richmond in the Victorian Football League (VFL).
