= Bob Makeham =

Australian rules footballer, born 1901

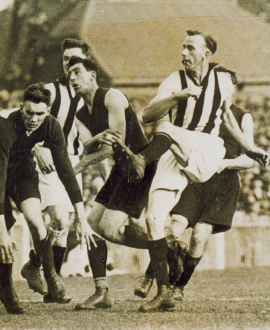
- Makeham during his Collingwood career

Personal information
- Full name: Robert Makeham
- Born: 6 November 1901; Welshpool, Victoria
- Died: 3 February 1974 (aged 72); Korumburra South, Victoria
- Original team: Kernot
- Height: 185 cm (6 ft 1 in)
- Weight: 85 kg (187 lb)

Playing career^{1}
Years	Club	Games (Goals)
1923–1932	Collingwood	157 (97)
- ^{1} Playing statistics correct to the end of 1932.

Robert Michael Makeham (6 November 1901 – 3 February 1974) was an Australian rules footballer who played with Collingwood in the Victorian Football League (VFL).

== Family ==
He married Doris Mary McKinnon (1902–1989) on 12 September 1934, at Dandenong, Victoria.

== Football ==
Recruited from the Kernot Football Club (the 1922 premiers) in the Bass Valley Football Association in South Eastern Victoria.

=== Collingwood (VFL) ===
After being part of losing VFL Grand Finals in 1925 and 1926 he played in Collingwood's 1927, 1928, 1929 and 1930 premiership sides.

A versatile player, Makeham played his early football as a centre-half forward and follower before settling into the half back and half forward flanks.

=== Maryborough (BFL) ===
Makeham coached the Maryborough Football Club in the Bendigo Football League (BFL) in 1933, in which they lost the 1933 BFL grand final to Sandhurst.

== Death ==
He died at Korumburra South on 3 February 1974.
