= Sam Jamison =

Australian rules footballer, born 1905

Personal information
- Full name: Sam Jamison
- Born: 13 November 1905
- Died: 14 December 1997 (aged 92)
- Height: 180 cm (5 ft 11 in)
- Weight: 73 kg (161 lb)

Playing career^{1}
Years	Club	Games (Goals)
1926–29	Richmond	5 (0)
- ^{1} Playing statistics correct to the end of 1929.

Sam Jamison (13 November 1905 – 14 December 1997) was an Australian rules footballer who played with Richmond in the Victorian Football League (VFL).
