= Len Ludbrooke =

Australian rules footballer

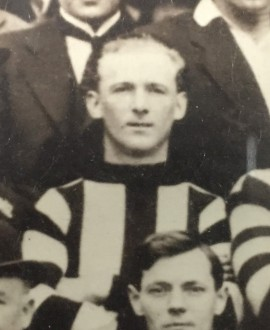
- Ludbrooke during his Collingwood career

Personal information
- Full name: Leonard Cecil Ludbrooke
- Born: 9 November 1894; South Melbourne, Victoria
- Died: 4 July 1968 (aged 73); Balwyn North, Victoria
- Original team: Ivanhoe
- Height: 175 cm (5 ft 9 in)
- Weight: 70 kg (154 lb)

Playing career^{1}
Years	Club	Games (Goals)
1920–21	Collingwood	4 (3)
- ^{1} Playing statistics correct to the end of 1921.

Leonard Cecil Ludbrooke (9 November 1894 – 4 July 1968) was an Australian rules footballer who played with Collingwood in the Victorian Football League (VFL).
