= Harry Weidner =

Australian rules footballer (1907–1962)

Personal information
- Full name: Norman Henry John Weidner
- Born: 3 March 1907; Warragul, Victoria
- Died: 29 January 1962 (aged 54); Ventnor, Victoria
- Original team: Warragul
- Height: 175 cm (5 ft 9 in)
- Weight: 72 kg (159 lb)

Playing career^{1}
Years	Club	Games (Goals)
1926–1932	Richmond	96 (128)
- ^{1} Playing statistics correct to the end of 1932.

Norman Henry John Weidner (3 March 1907 – 29 January 1962) was an Australian rules footballer who played with Richmond in the Victorian Football League (VFL).

== Family ==
The son of Williamstown and Prahran footballer, Alfred Christian Weidner (1880-1959), and Ada Alice Weidner (1880-1963), née Whitmore, Norman Henry John Weidner was born at Warragul, Victoria on 3 March 1907.

He married Violet Camelia Rich (1908-1982), at Cheltenham, Victoria, on 19 January 1935.

His cousin, Alexander Leslie "Les" Gallagher (1904-1973), also played VFL football for Richmond.

== Football ==
Weidner was a half forward flanker from Warragul who kicked at least 25 goals every season from 1928 to 1931 and was Richmond's second top goal-kicker in the first of those years.

He appeared in Richmond's 1927, 1928 and 1929 grand final losses and managed to kick two goals in both the 1928 and 1929 Grand Finals. In total, he kicked 15 goals from the nine finals that he played during his career. Richmond broke through for a premiership in 1932 but Weidner wasn't part of the success, having injured his knee playing against Collingwood in round 10.

He represented the 1928 Victorian interstate team which defeated South Australia in Melbourne by nine points.

Weidner later coached Warragul in the Central Gippsland League.

== Death ==
He died at Ventnor, Victoria on 29 January 1962.
