= Billy Libbis =

Australian rules footballer, born 1903

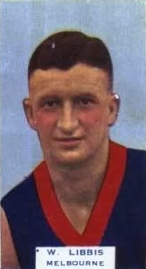

Personal information
- Full name: William Edward Libbis
- Nickname: Pickles
- Born: 2 July 1903; Port Melbourne, Victoria
- Died: 15 August 1986 (aged 83); Doncaster, Victoria
- Original team: Fairfield
- Height: 175 cm (5 ft 9 in)
- Weight: 80 kg (176 lb)
- Position: Rover

Playing career^{1}
Years	Club	Games (Goals)
1925–1933	Collingwood	138 (150)
1933–1935	Melbourne	39 (25)
Total		177 (175)

Representative team honours^{2}
Years	Team	Games (Goals)
1926–1933	Victoria	12
- ^{1} Playing statistics correct to the end of 1935.^{2} Representative statistics correct as of 1933.

William Edward Libbis (2 July 1903 – 15 August 1986) was an Australian rules footballer who played with Collingwood and Melbourne in the Victorian Football League (VFL).

== Family ==
William Edward Libbis was born in Port Melbourne, Victoria on 2 July 1903.

He married Stella Millicent Hannebery (1905–1961) in 1929.

== Collingwood ==
Libbis was a rover and made his debut in 1925. He became a member of the successful Collingwood side which won four consecutive premierships from 1927 to 1930, Libbis the first rover for each grand final. Gordon Coventry called him "the best rover he ever saw".

In 1931, he was suspended for eight weeks for striking Ted Pool in the match against Hawthorn on 9 May 1931. Returning from his suspension, he only played in three matches before he was hospitalized and operated on for appendicitis. He did not play again that season.

== Melbourne ==
At the beginning of the 1933 season Libbis protested against the player's weekly match payments being reduced and he was cleared to leave the club for Melbourne.

== Northcote ==
Having transferred from being the coach of the State Savings Bank team in the Victorian Amateur Football Association (VAFA) in 1938, he served as coach of Northcote from 1939 to 1941 (the VFA was in recess due to World war II 1942–1944); he began his tenure as a non-playing coach, but soon returned to the field as a captain-coach.
