= Len Murphy =

Australian rules footballer, born 1909

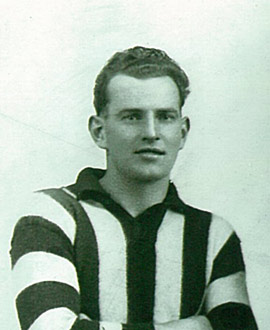
- Murphy during his Collingwood career

Personal information
- Full name: Leonard Murphy
- Born: 23 November 1909; Bairnsdale, Victoria
- Died: 20 December 1996 (aged 87)
- Original team: Williamstown (VFA)
- Height: 189 cm (6 ft 2 in)
- Weight: 86 kg (190 lb)

Playing career^{1}
Years	Club	Games (Goals)
1927	Williamstown (VFA)	15 (7)
1928–1937	Collingwood	173 (105)
1938	Nhill	
1939	Oakleigh (VFA)	16 (15)
1940–1941	Footscray	25 (28)
- ^{1} Playing statistics correct to the end of 1941.

Career highlights
- Collingwood premiership player 1928–30

Leonard Murphy (23 November 1909 – 20 December 1996) was an Australian rules footballer who played with Collingwood and Footscray in the Victorian Football League (VFL). His older brother Frank played beside him for much of his career.

== Football ==
Murphy played mainly in the ruck and was a member of a Collingwood side which was a force in the VFL during the 1930s.

They had just won a premiership when he joined the club and his debut season of 1928 saw them go back to back, with Murphy kicking two goals in their grand final win over Richmond. Collingwood won the flag again in 1929 and 1930 with Murphy a member of both premiership sides. He missed out on the 1935 premiership after being injured and again the following year due to suspension.

At the end of 1937 he left the club and joined Nhill as captain-coach.

He returned to Melbourne and served as captain-coach of Victorian Football Association club Oakleigh in 1939, before making a return to the league in 1940 with Footscray.
