= Ralph Empey =

Australian rules footballer (1904–1960)

Personal information
- Full name: Ralph Empey
- Born: 22 September 1904; Koondrook, Victoria
- Died: 28 September 1960 (aged 56); Fitzroy, Victoria
- Original team: Scotch College
- Height: 175 cm (5 ft 9 in)
- Weight: 74 kg (163 lb)
- Position: Forward

Playing career^{1}
Years	Club	Games (Goals)
1924–25, 1928–30	Richmond	49 (29)
- ^{1} Playing statistics correct to the end of 1930.

Ralph Empey (22 September 1904 – 28 September 1960) was an Australian rules footballer who played with Richmond in the Victorian Football League (VFL).

== Football ==
Empey played his early football at Scotch College and made his first VFL appearance in 1924.

In his 49-game career he played in nine finals, including two grand finals, both of which Richmond lost. He kicked two goals from a forward pocket in the 1928 Grand Final and was a half forward flanker in the premiership decider a year later.

In Round 1, 1930, he was the first player ever substituted into a VFL match following the introduction of the 19th man rule that year, replacing the injured Hope Collins at three-quarter time.

== Cricket ==
Empey was also a capable cricketer, and as a journeyman in district cricket played a total of 79 first XI games for Melbourne, Richmond, University and Carlton between 1923–24 and 1938–39, averaging 21.1 with the bat and taking 91 wickets at 28.1 with the ball.
