= Frank Murphy (Australian rules footballer) =

Australian rules footballer

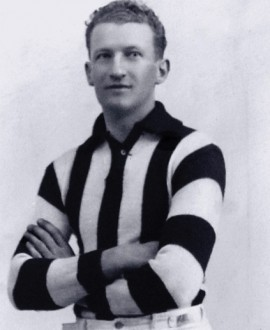
- Murphy during his Collingwood career

Personal information
- Full name: Francis John Murphy
- Born: 28 January 1905; Bairnsdale, Victoria
- Died: 25 May 1995 (aged 90); Perth, WA
- Height: 180 cm (5 ft 11 in)
- Weight: 78 kg (172 lb)
- Position: Centre Half Forward

Playing career^{1}
Years	Club	Games (Goals)
1925–1934	Collingwood	145 (121)
1935–1937	Subiaco (WAFL)	33 (11)
- ^{1} Playing statistics correct to the end of 1937.

Career highlights
- 3 time VFL interstate representative; Collingwood premiership player 1927–30

Francis John Murphy (20 February 1905 – 25 May 1995) was an Australian rules footballer who played with Collingwood in the Victorian Football League (VFL).

Murphy was a half-forward as a member of a successful Collingwood side played in four premierships, three of them with his brother Len. After leaving the club in 1935, he moved to Western Australia, where he became captain-coach of Subiaco in the Western Australian Football League and the Kalgoorlie City Football Club in the Goldfields Football League.

Murphy later served in the Royal Australian Air Force during World War II.
