= Harry Chesswas =

Australian rules footballer, born 1901

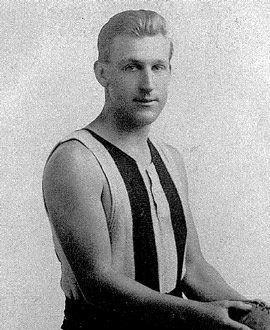
- Chesswas during his Collingwood career

Personal information
- Full name: Harold Clark Chesswas
- Born: 18 June 1901; Collingwood, Victoria
- Died: 24 October 1956 (aged 55); Kew, Victoria
- Original team: Northcote
- Height: 173 cm (5 ft 8 in)
- Weight: 72 kg (159 lb)

Playing career^{1}
Years	Club	Games (Goals)
1922–1931	Collingwood	154 (45)
- ^{1} Playing statistics correct to the end of 1931.

Harold Clark "Bottles" Chesswas (18 June 1901 – 24 October 1956) was an Australian rules footballer who played with Collingwood in the VFL.

== Family ==
The son of George Forrester Chesswas (1858–1924), and Louisa Chesswas (1862–1903), née Freeman, Harold Clark Chesswas was born in Collingwood, Victoria, on 18 June 1901.

He married Letitia Mary Lingham (1902–1972) in 1932.

== Football ==
Chesswas was a utility player, who played mainly on the wing.

== Death ==
He died at Kew, Victoria, on 24 October 1956.
