= Charlie Dibbs =

Australian rules footballer (1905–1960)

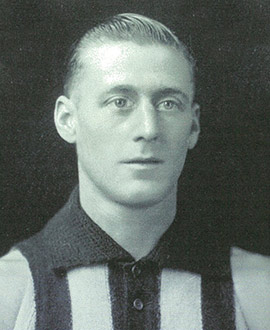
- Dibbs during his Collingwood career

Personal information
- Full name: Charles William Dibbs
- Born: 3 April 1905; Carlton, Victoria
- Died: 22 November 1960 (aged 55); Preston, Victoria
- Height: 175 cm (5 ft 9 in)
- Weight: 76 kg (168 lb)

Playing career^{1}
Years	Club	Games (Goals)
1924–1935	Collingwood	216 (1)
1936	Geelong	7 (0)
Total		223 (1)

Coaching career
Years	Club	Games (W–L–D)
1936	Geelong	7 (3–4–0)
- ^{1} Playing statistics correct to the end of 1936.

Career highlights
- Collingwood premiership player 1927, 1928, 1929, 1930, 1935

Charlie Dibbs (3 April 1905 – 22 November 1960) was an Australian rules footballer who played for the Collingwood Magpies in the Victorian Football League (VFL) during the 1920s and 1930s.

Charlie Dibbs was born Charles William Heaton in Carlton in 1905, the son of William George Heaton and Elizabeth (née Hodge). He took the Dibbs surname after his mother remarried following his father's death.

Most of Dibbs' football career was spent at fullback, and he was a member of the Collingwood side, which won four consecutive premierships. Dibbs kicked his only career goal in his 4th match and was goalless for the remaining 219 consecutive games; as of 2023, this streak remains the longest goalless streak by a single player in VFL/AFL history.

He finished his career in that league with a season as captain-coach of Geelong in 1936.

Dibbs was appointed playing coach with Latrobe in the NWFU in 1937, and also represented the NWFU in an intrastate match against the NTFA. He decided to return to the mainland after the season was over.

In 1938, Charlie was appointed coach of Williamstown, but within days of being advised that club he preferred accepting the position at Essendon of coach of the Second Eighteen side.

Dibbs was a Collingwood life member, and in 2007, he was inducted into the Magpies' Hall of Fame.
