= Jack Fincher (footballer) =

Australian rules footballer (1904–1970)

Personal information
- Full name: John Alexander Fincher
- Born: 27 November 1904; Lauriston, Victoria
- Died: 4 October 1970 (aged 65); Mount Beauty, Victoria
- Original teams: Foundry, Castlemaine
- Height: 168 cm (5 ft 6 in)
- Weight: 72 kg (159 lb)
- Position: Rover

Playing career^{1}
Years	Club	Games (Goals)
1927–1930	Richmond	69 (54)
1931–1933	Footscray	36 (24)
Total		105 (78)
- ^{1} Playing statistics correct to the end of 1933.

John Alexander Fincher (27 November 1904 – 4 October 1970) was an Australian rules footballer who played for Richmond and Footscray in the Victorian Football League (VFL).

== Family ==
One of the nine children (six boys and three girls) of George Francis Fincher (1865–1959), and Margaret Lawrence Fincher (c.1866–1956), née Nicoll, John Alexander Fincher was born in Lauriston, Victoria on 27 November 1904.

His elder brother Charlie played at South Melbourne, and was killed in the very first landings at Gallipoli on 25 April 1915.

== Football ==
Fincher was unlucky not to play in a premiership side while at Richmond, appearing in three successive losing Grand Finals from 1927, his debut season. He kicked Richmond's only goal in the rain-affected 1927 grand final. As a rover, he kicked 23 goals in 1928. He crossed to Footscray in 1931, a year before Richmond broke through for their premiership.

== Death ==
He died at Mount Beauty, Victoria on 4 October 1970.
