= Cyril Lilburne =

Australian rules footballer, born 1902

Personal information
- Born: 9 August 1902
- Died: 10 June 1985 (aged 82)
- Original teams: Collegians (VAFA); Brighton (VFA)
- Height: 182 cm (6 ft 0 in)
- Weight: 82 kg (181 lb)

Playing career^{1}
Years	Club	Games (Goals)
1926–1929	Richmond	74 (20)
- ^{1} Playing statistics correct to the end of 1929.

Career highlights
- Richmond Captain 1929; Interstate Games:- 2

Cyril 'Dooley' Lilburne (9 August 1902 – 10 June 1985) was an Australian rules football player who played in the VFL between 1926 and 1929 for the Richmond Football Club.
