= George Clayden =

Australian rules footballer, born 1903

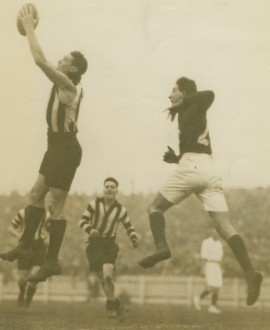
- Clayden (left) during his Collingwood career

Personal information
- Born: 14 August 1903; Northcote, Victoria
- Died: 25 March 1990 (aged 86); Kew, Victoria
- Original team: Abbotsford Cadets
- Height: 187 cm (6 ft 2 in)
- Weight: 87 kg (192 lb)

Playing career^{1}
Years	Club	Games (Goals)
1924–1933	Collingwood	134 (79)
- ^{1} Playing statistics correct to the end of 1933.

George Clayden (14 August 1903 – 25 March 1990) was an Australian rules footballer who played with Collingwood in the Victorian Football League (VFL).

Clayden usually played either across the centre half back or in the ruck and was known as one of the toughest players during his era. Nicknamed "Kitty", Clayden was a member of the Collingwood side which won four premierships in a row and also represented the VFL in interstate football. He retired in 1933 after sustaining a serious knee injury.
