= Harold Rumney =

Australian rules footballer, born 1907

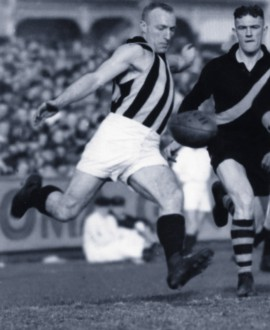
- Rumney during his Collingwood career

Personal information
- Full name: Harold Waldmere Rumney
- Born: 16 May 1907; Kyabram, Victoria
- Died: 16 November 1987 (aged 80)
- Original team: Brighton
- Height: 171 cm (5 ft 7 in)
- Weight: 76 kg (168 lb)

Playing career^{1}
Years	Club	Games (Goals)
1925–1926	Carlton	15 (9)
1927–1937	Collingwood	171 (28)
Total		186 (37)
- ^{1} Playing statistics correct to the end of 1937.

Career highlights
- Collingwood Premiership side 1927–1930, 1935; Collingwood best & fairest 1931; Victorian Representative; Collingwood Team of the Century

Harold Waldmere Rumney (16 May 1907 – 16 November 1987) was an Australian rules footballer.

Rumney was rejected by Carlton Football Club after 15 games in two seasons and transferred to Collingwood Football Club. His arrival at Collingwood was fortuitous. He played in the quartet of premierships, 1927–1930, as well as the 1935 premiership. He left Collingwood to coach Northcote in the VFA for season 1936 but returned to Collingwood in 1937. He regularly represented Victoria and won Collingwood's best and fairest award in 1931.

He played 15 games for Carlton, scoring 9 goals, and 171 games for Collingwood, scoring 28 goals.
