= Thomas O'Halloran (footballer) =

Australian rules footballer (1904–1956)

Personal information
- Full name: Thomas Hugh O'Halloran
- Born: 24 December 1904; Timaru, New Zealand
- Died: 31 March 1956 (aged 51); Camberwell, Victoria
- Original team: Wesley College/Burnley
- Height: 185 cm (6 ft 1 in)
- Weight: 79.5 kg (175 lb)

Playing career^{1}
Years	Club	Games (Goals)
1925–1934	Richmond	142 (120)
- ^{1} Playing statistics correct to the end of 1934.

Career highlights
- Richmond Premiership Player 1932, 1934; Richmond Hall of Fame – inducted 2013; Interstate Games:- 2

Thomas Hugh O'Halloran (24 December 1904 – 31 March 1956) was an Australian rules footballer who played in the VFL between 1925 and 1934 for the Richmond Football Club. He served as Richmond's Reserves Coach in 1935 and as the club's vice president in 1936 and 1940.

== See also ==
- 1927 Melbourne Carnival
