= 1928 VFL season =

32nd season of the Victorian Football League (VFL)

1928 VFL premiership season

Overview
- Date: 21 April – 29 September 1928
- Teams: 12
- Premiers: Collingwood; 7th premiership
- Runners-up: Richmond; 4th runners-up result
- Minor premiers: Collingwood; 10th minor premiership
- Brownlow Medallist: Ivor Warne-Smith (Melbourne); 8 votes
- Leading goalkicker medallist: Gordon Coventry (Collingwood); 78 goals

Attendance
- Matches played: 112
- Total attendance: 2,053,432 (18,334 per match)
- Highest (H&A): 41,402 (round 15, Melbourne v Carlton)
- Highest (finals): 66,381 (semi-final, Richmond v Carlton)

The 1928 VFL season was the 32nd season of the Victorian Football League (VFL), the highest-level senior Australian rules football competition in Victoria. The season featured twelve clubs and ran from 21 April to 29 September, comprising an 18-match home-and-away season followed by a four-week finals series featuring the top four clubs.

Collingwood won the premiership, defeating Richmond by 33 points in the 1928 VFL grand final; it was Collingwood's second consecutive premiership and seventh VFL premiership overall. Collingwood also won the minor premiership by finishing atop the home-and-away ladder with a 15–3 win–loss record. Melbourne's Ivor Warne-Smith won his second Brownlow Medal as the league's best and fairest player, and Collingwood's Gordon Coventry won his third consecutive leading goalkicker medal as the league's leading goalkicker.

== Background ==
In 1928, the VFL competition consisted of twelve teams of 18 on-the-field players each, with no "reserves", although any of the 18 players who had left the playing field for any reason could later resume their place on the field at any time during the match.

Teams played each other in a home-and-away season of 18 rounds; matches 12 to 18 were the "home-and-way reverse" of matches 1 to 7.

Once the 18 round home-and-away season had finished, the 1928 VFL Premiers were determined by the specific format and conventions of the amended "Argus system".

== Home-and-away season ==
=== Round 1 ===
Home team	Home team score	Away team	Away team score	Venue	Crowd	Date
Hawthorn	9.13 (67)	St Kilda	10.10 (70)	Glenferrie Oval	15,000	21 April 1928
Essendon	11.6 (72)	Melbourne	13.7 (85)	Windy Hill	20,000	21 April 1928
Richmond	14.15 (99)	North Melbourne	2.9 (21)	Punt Road Oval	20,000	21 April 1928
South Melbourne	14.16 (100)	Footscray	15.9 (99)	Lake Oval	20,000	21 April 1928
Geelong	8.12 (60)	Collingwood	9.12 (66)	Corio Oval	18,000	21 April 1928
Fitzroy	11.13 (79)	Carlton	18.9 (117)	Brunswick Street Oval	30,000	21 April 1928

=== Round 2 ===
Home team	Home team score	Away team	Away team score	Venue	Crowd	Date
St Kilda	14.12 (96)	South Melbourne	17.15 (117)	Junction Oval	20,000	28 April 1928
Collingwood	14.18 (102)	Fitzroy	9.13 (67)	Victoria Park	20,000	28 April 1928
Carlton	13.9 (87)	Richmond	10.6 (66)	Princes Park	40,000	28 April 1928
North Melbourne	10.16 (76)	Hawthorn	8.13 (61)	Arden Street Oval	6,000	28 April 1928
Melbourne	6.11 (47)	Geelong	4.16 (40)	MCG	15,122	28 April 1928
Footscray	10.9 (69)	Essendon	10.13 (73)	Western Oval	20,000	28 April 1928

=== Round 3 ===
Home team	Home team score	Away team	Away team score	Venue	Crowd	Date
Fitzroy	12.12 (84)	Melbourne	17.16 (118)	Brunswick Street Oval	17,000	5 May 1928
Essendon	12.13 (85)	South Melbourne	5.11 (41)	Windy Hill	22,000	5 May 1928
St Kilda	11.11 (77)	North Melbourne	10.15 (75)	Junction Oval	12,000	5 May 1928
Geelong	10.17 (77)	Footscray	12.9 (81)	Corio Oval	12,500	5 May 1928
Richmond	5.14 (44)	Collingwood	5.12 (42)	Punt Road Oval	36,000	5 May 1928
Hawthorn	7.17 (59)	Carlton	14.9 (93)	Glenferrie Oval	14,000	5 May 1928

=== Round 4 ===
Home team	Home team score	Away team	Away team score	Venue	Crowd	Date
Melbourne	7.13 (55)	Richmond	6.15 (51)	MCG	26,558	12 May 1928
Essendon	6.11 (47)	Geelong	6.14 (50)	Windy Hill	10,000	12 May 1928
Collingwood	15.22 (112)	Hawthorn	5.9 (39)	Victoria Park	8,000	12 May 1928
Carlton	16.24 (120)	St Kilda	3.6 (24)	Princes Park	18,000	12 May 1928
South Melbourne	10.9 (69)	North Melbourne	10.10 (70)	Lake Oval	10,000	12 May 1928
Footscray	11.11 (77)	Fitzroy	10.4 (64)	Western Oval	12,500	12 May 1928

=== Round 5 ===
Home team	Home team score	Away team	Away team score	Venue	Crowd	Date
Hawthorn	14.17 (101)	Melbourne	16.14 (110)	Glenferrie Oval	8,000	19 May 1928
Geelong	15.15 (105)	South Melbourne	11.15 (81)	Corio Oval	13,000	19 May 1928
Richmond	13.22 (100)	Footscray	12.14 (86)	Punt Road Oval	30,000	19 May 1928
Fitzroy	11.18 (84)	Essendon	13.17 (95)	Brunswick Street Oval	18,000	19 May 1928
St Kilda	11.8 (74)	Collingwood	15.12 (102)	Junction Oval	16,000	19 May 1928
North Melbourne	11.15 (81)	Carlton	9.11 (65)	Arden Street Oval	22,000	19 May 1928

=== Round 6 ===
Home team	Home team score	Away team	Away team score	Venue	Crowd	Date
Melbourne	13.8 (86)	St Kilda	11.8 (74)	MCG	16,870	26 May 1928
Footscray	17.19 (121)	Hawthorn	7.3 (45)	Western Oval	14,000	26 May 1928
Essendon	10.8 (68)	Richmond	7.19 (61)	Windy Hill	20,000	26 May 1928
Collingwood	12.12 (84)	North Melbourne	6.9 (45)	Victoria Park	25,000	26 May 1928
Geelong	19.8 (122)	Fitzroy	2.27 (39)	Corio Oval	11,000	26 May 1928
South Melbourne	12.10 (82)	Carlton	12.13 (85)	Lake Oval	28,000	26 May 1928

=== Round 7 ===
Home team	Home team score	Away team	Away team score	Venue	Crowd	Date
Fitzroy	17.11 (113)	South Melbourne	11.11 (77)	Brunswick Street Oval	8,000	2 June 1928
Carlton	12.12 (84)	Collingwood	13.9 (87)	Princes Park	30,000	2 June 1928
North Melbourne	5.7 (37)	Melbourne	14.16 (100)	Arden Street Oval	9,000	2 June 1928
Richmond	12.21 (93)	Geelong	13.12 (90)	Punt Road Oval	10,000	2 June 1928
St Kilda	9.17 (71)	Footscray	11.6 (72)	Junction Oval	12,000	2 June 1928
Hawthorn	7.15 (57)	Essendon	13.20 (98)	Glenferrie Oval	6,000	2 June 1928

=== Round 8 ===
Home team	Home team score	Away team	Away team score	Venue	Crowd	Date
Geelong	15.21 (111)	Hawthorn	3.9 (27)	Corio Oval	9,500	4 June 1928
Footscray	18.15 (123)	North Melbourne	8.13 (61)	Western Oval	17,000	4 June 1928
Fitzroy	17.13 (115)	Richmond	19.6 (120)	Brunswick Street Oval	15,000	4 June 1928
Essendon	10.7 (67)	St Kilda	11.10 (76)	Windy Hill	20,000	4 June 1928
South Melbourne	9.14 (68)	Collingwood	13.7 (85)	Lake Oval	22,000	4 June 1928
Melbourne	10.14 (74)	Carlton	9.10 (64)	MCG	41,402	4 June 1928

=== Round 9 ===
Home team	Home team score	Away team	Away team score	Venue	Crowd	Date
Richmond	21.16 (142)	South Melbourne	9.12 (66)	Punt Road Oval	21,000	9 June 1928
Collingwood	13.14 (92)	Melbourne	11.14 (80)	Victoria Park	27,000	9 June 1928
Carlton	9.7 (61)	Footscray	8.14 (62)	Princes Park	25,000	9 June 1928
St Kilda	14.13 (97)	Geelong	10.6 (66)	Junction Oval	17,000	9 June 1928
Hawthorn	10.12 (72)	Fitzroy	15.16 (106)	Glenferrie Oval	8,000	9 June 1928
North Melbourne	9.5 (59)	Essendon	10.10 (70)	Arden Street Oval	13,000	9 June 1928

=== Round 10 ===
Home team	Home team score	Away team	Away team score	Venue	Crowd	Date
Geelong	11.11 (77)	North Melbourne	8.4 (52)	Corio Oval	10,000	23 June 1928
Fitzroy	8.13 (61)	St Kilda	12.16 (88)	Brunswick Street Oval	18,000	23 June 1928
South Melbourne	11.12 (78)	Melbourne	13.12 (90)	Lake Oval	17,000	23 June 1928
Richmond	13.24 (102)	Hawthorn	11.10 (76)	Punt Road Oval	16,000	23 June 1928
Footscray	9.10 (64)	Collingwood	11.12 (78)	Western Oval	30,000	23 June 1928
Essendon	9.12 (66)	Carlton	10.18 (78)	Windy Hill	22,000	23 June 1928

=== Round 11 ===
Home team	Home team score	Away team	Away team score	Venue	Crowd	Date
Hawthorn	14.11 (95)	South Melbourne	15.10 (100)	Glenferrie Oval	6,000	30 June 1928
Collingwood	12.13 (85)	Essendon	8.9 (57)	Victoria Park	16,000	30 June 1928
Carlton	20.12 (132)	Geelong	15.14 (104)	Princes Park	25,000	30 June 1928
St Kilda	9.11 (65)	Richmond	12.9 (81)	Junction Oval	28,500	30 June 1928
Melbourne	10.8 (68)	Footscray	8.8 (56)	MCG	24,562	30 June 1928
North Melbourne	7.14 (56)	Fitzroy	15.12 (102)	Arden Street Oval	8,000	30 June 1928

=== Round 12 ===
Home team	Home team score	Away team	Away team score	Venue	Crowd	Date
North Melbourne	8.5 (53)	Richmond	12.18 (90)	Arden Street Oval	12,000	7 July 1928
Footscray	13.13 (91)	South Melbourne	13.11 (89)	Western Oval	17,000	7 July 1928
Collingwood	9.13 (67)	Geelong	12.6 (78)	Victoria Park	17,000	7 July 1928
Carlton	12.10 (82)	Fitzroy	12.14 (86)	Princes Park	25,000	7 July 1928
St Kilda	20.14 (134)	Hawthorn	12.13 (85)	Junction Oval	19,000	7 July 1928
Melbourne	8.19 (67)	Essendon	12.17 (89)	MCG	18,695	7 July 1928

=== Round 13 ===
Home team	Home team score	Away team	Away team score	Venue	Crowd	Date
Hawthorn	8.17 (65)	North Melbourne	10.9 (69)	Glenferrie Oval	3,000	14 July 1928
Geelong	6.15 (51)	Melbourne	7.13 (55)	Corio Oval	16,500	14 July 1928
Essendon	15.14 (104)	Footscray	11.8 (74)	Windy Hill	20,000	14 July 1928
South Melbourne	10.10 (70)	St Kilda	18.13 (121)	Lake Oval	15,000	14 July 1928
Fitzroy	7.12 (54)	Collingwood	14.15 (99)	Brunswick Street Oval	18,000	14 July 1928
Richmond	15.15 (105)	Carlton	11.13 (79)	Punt Road Oval	30,000	14 July 1928

=== Round 14 ===
Home team	Home team score	Away team	Away team score	Venue	Crowd	Date
North Melbourne	11.12 (78)	St Kilda	21.11 (137)	Arden Street Oval	11,000	28 July 1928
Footscray	8.9 (57)	Geelong	8.8 (56)	Western Oval	14,000	28 July 1928
Collingwood	11.15 (81)	Richmond	10.13 (73)	Victoria Park	30,000	28 July 1928
Carlton	22.17 (149)	Hawthorn	11.13 (79)	Princes Park	10,000	28 July 1928
Melbourne	18.18 (126)	Fitzroy	11.13 (79)	MCG	13,562	28 July 1928
South Melbourne	11.17 (83)	Essendon	18.11 (119)	Lake Oval	16,000	28 July 1928

=== Round 15 ===
Home team	Home team score	Away team	Away team score	Venue	Crowd	Date
North Melbourne	12.10 (82)	South Melbourne	11.14 (80)	Arden Street Oval	6,000	4 August 1928
Fitzroy	13.12 (90)	Footscray	12.17 (89)	Brunswick Street Oval	12,000	4 August 1928
Richmond	11.13 (79)	Melbourne	7.8 (50)	Punt Road Oval	26,000	4 August 1928
Geelong	4.14 (38)	Essendon	12.10 (82)	Corio Oval	10,000	4 August 1928
Hawthorn	9.9 (63)	Collingwood	17.18 (120)	Glenferrie Oval	5,000	4 August 1928
St Kilda	13.15 (93)	Carlton	10.9 (69)	Junction Oval	31,000	4 August 1928

=== Round 16 ===
Home team	Home team score	Away team	Away team score	Venue	Crowd	Date
Footscray	8.6 (54)	Richmond	10.17 (77)	Western Oval	18,000	11 August 1928
Essendon	7.12 (54)	Fitzroy	8.14 (62)	Windy Hill	18,000	11 August 1928
Collingwood	15.16 (106)	St Kilda	6.14 (50)	Victoria Park	25,000	11 August 1928
Carlton	10.12 (72)	North Melbourne	6.10 (46)	Princes Park	14,000	11 August 1928
Melbourne	12.16 (88)	Hawthorn	9.10 (64)	MCG	6,547	11 August 1928
South Melbourne	15.14 (104)	Geelong	9.13 (67)	Lake Oval	8,000	11 August 1928

=== Round 17 ===
Home team	Home team score	Away team	Away team score	Venue	Crowd	Date
Fitzroy	16.9 (105)	Geelong	12.9 (81)	Brunswick Street Oval	9,000	18 August 1928
Carlton	9.20 (74)	South Melbourne	8.8 (56)	Princes Park	18,500	18 August 1928
St Kilda	12.10 (82)	Melbourne	11.15 (81)	Junction Oval	17,000	18 August 1928
Hawthorn	8.8 (56)	Footscray	19.9 (123)	Glenferrie Oval	8,500	18 August 1928
Richmond	22.14 (146)	Essendon	11.11 (77)	Punt Road Oval	30,000	18 August 1928
North Melbourne	8.9 (57)	Collingwood	8.17 (65)	Arden Street Oval	11,000	18 August 1928

=== Round 18 ===
Home team	Home team score	Away team	Away team score	Venue	Crowd	Date
Melbourne	18.19 (127)	North Melbourne	6.4 (40)	MCG	8,609	1 September 1928
Geelong	9.9 (63)	Richmond	15.21 (111)	Corio Oval	7,000	1 September 1928
Footscray	9.13 (67)	St Kilda	10.10 (70)	Western Oval	14,000	1 September 1928
Essendon	16.22 (118)	Hawthorn	9.6 (60)	Windy Hill	10,000	1 September 1928
South Melbourne	14.16 (100)	Fitzroy	13.12 (90)	Lake Oval	8,000	1 September 1928
Collingwood	8.19 (67)	Carlton	12.15 (87)	Victoria Park	30,000	1 September 1928

== Ladder ==
(P)	Premiers
	Qualified for finals

#	Team	P	W	L	D	PF	PA	%	Pts
1	Collingwood (P)	18	15	3	0	1540	1144	134.6	60
2	Richmond	18	14	4	0	1640	1228	133.6	56
3	Melbourne	18	14	4	0	1507	1233	122.2	56
4	Carlton	18	11	7	0	1598	1316	121.4	44
5	Essendon	18	11	7	0	1441	1275	113.0	44
6	St Kilda	18	11	7	0	1499	1470	102.0	44
7	Footscray	18	9	9	0	1465	1340	109.3	36
8	Fitzroy	18	7	11	0	1480	1675	88.4	28
9	Geelong	18	6	12	0	1336	1343	99.5	24
10	South Melbourne	18	5	13	0	1461	1709	85.5	20
11	North Melbourne	18	5	13	0	1058	1563	67.7	20
12	Hawthorn	18	0	18	0	1171	1900	61.6	0

Rules for classification: 1. premiership points; 2. percentage; 3. points for
Average score: 79.6
Source: AFL Tables

== Finals series ==
All of the 1928 finals were played at the MCG so the home team in the semi-finals and preliminary final is purely the higher ranked team from the ladder but in the Grand Final the home team was the team that won the preliminary final.

=== Semi-finals ===
Home team	Score	Away team	Score	Venue	Crowd	Date
Richmond	17.15 (117)	Carlton	9.10 (64)	MCG	66,381	8 September
Collingwood	9.8 (62)	Melbourne	9.8 (62)	MCG	41,423	15 September
Collingwood	10.8 (68)	Melbourne	9.10 (64)	MCG	42,175	22 September

== Season notes ==
- In Round 4, Footscray beat Geelong for the first time in its history after 25 winless matches (19 in the VFA for two draws and 17 losses and six in the VFL for six losses) over 14 years of competition (1886, 1888–1896, and 1925–1928).
- "Player Blows Umpire's Whistle". Something never before seen at a football match occurred at [the round 6 match between Hawthorn and Footscray at] Hawthorn on Saturday [26 May 1928]. The field umpire was knocked out when the ball struck him on the face, but a Footscray player dashed down the field with the ball. A Hawthorn player took in the situation at a glance and as the umpire was unable to rise this player rushed to his side, seized his whistle and blew a blast which stopped the play. -- The Herald, 1 June 1928.
- One of the most unusual games was played at Corio Oval in round 6, between Fitzroy and Geelong. The game finished with Fitzroy scoring 2.27 (39): they hit the post five times, and only scored their second goal in time on of the fourth quarter. With 25 more behinds than goals, this remains the least accurate performance from any team by this metric. Geelong, on the other hand, scored 19.8 (122), giving them two fewer scoring shots than the Maroons, but they won by 83 points. As of 2024, this remains the record winning margin for a team with fewer scoring shots than their opponent.
- In the round 7 match between Richmond and Geelong, played under atrocious weather conditions on a slushy, wet Punt Road Oval, Richmond players wore fingerless gloves (mittens) to help them control the slippery football.
- On Saturday 16 June, three separate VFL combined teams played representative matches at three different locations: the first VFL team beat a Combined Ovens and Murray Football League side 16.15 (111) to 15.14 (104) at Wangaratta, Victoria, the second beat a Combined New South Wales Australian Football Association side 26.13 (169) to 14.11 (95) at the Sydney Cricket Ground, and the third drew with a Combined South Australian Football League team 13.10 (88) to 11.22 (88) in Adelaide once an incorrectly attributed behind had been deducted from Victoria's scoreboard score by the goal umpires.
- In round 17, Melbourne lodged an official protest against the result of its one-point loss against St Kilda, arguing that Bert Smedley's winning goal was kicked about seven seconds after the final bell had rung. The timekeepers agreed that the goal had been scored after the bell, but the protest was dismissed as league rules specified that the field umpire was the sole judge of the sound of the bell.
- The second semi-final match between Collingwood and Melbourne finished in a draw, the first of eight draws in the history of VFL/AFL finals. A full replay was staged the following week, which was won by Collingwood. The draw meant that Richmond, who had won the first semi-final, endured a second consecutive bye week before the final.

== Awards ==
- The 1928 VFL Premiership team was Collingwood.
- The VFL's leading goalkicker was Gordon Coventry of Collingwood with 89 goals.
- The winner of the 1928 Brownlow Medal was Ivor Warne-Smith of Melbourne with 8 votes.
- Hawthorn took the "wooden spoon" in 1928.
- The seconds premiership was won by Carlton for the third consecutive year. Carlton 18.18 (126) defeated Geelong 14.11 (95) in the final, played as a stand-alone game on Thursday 27 September (Show Day holiday) at the Melbourne Cricket Ground before a crowd of 8,000. Carlton received permanent possession of the seconds premiership trophy, the Rosen Cup, as the first team to win it three times.

== Sources ==
- 1928 VFL season at AFL Tables
- 1928 VFL season at Australian Football
