= 1927 VFL season =

31st season of the Victorian Football League (VFL)

1927 VFL premiership season

Overview
- Date: 30 April – 1 October 1927
- Teams: 12
- Premiers: Collingwood; 6th premiership
- Runners-up: Richmond; 3rd runners-up result
- Minor premiers: Collingwood; 9th minor premiership
- Brownlow Medallist: Syd Coventry (Collingwood); 7 votes
- Leading goalkicker medallist: Gordon Coventry (Collingwood); 88 goals

Attendance
- Matches played: 111
- Total attendance: 1,862,068 (16,775 per match)
- Highest (H&A): 42,000 (round 6, Richmond v Carlton)
- Highest (finals): 63,620 (semi-final, Richmond v Carlton)

The 1927 VFL season was the 31st season of the Victorian Football League (VFL), the highest-level senior Australian rules football competition in Victoria. The season featured twelve clubs and ran from 30 April to 1 October, comprising an 18-match home-and-away season followed by a three-week finals series featuring the top four clubs.

Collingwood won the premiership, defeating Richmond by twelve points in the 1927 VFL grand final; it was Collingwood's sixth VFL premiership. Collingwood also won the minor premiership by finishing atop the home-and-away ladder with a 15–3 win–loss record. Collingwood's Syd Coventry won the Brownlow Medal as the league's best and fairest player, and his brother and teammate Gordon Coventry won his second consecutive leading goalkicker medal as the league's leading goalkicker.

== Background ==
In 1927, the VFL competition consisted of twelve teams of 18 on-the-field players each, with no "reserves", although any of the 18 players who had left the playing field for any reason could later resume their place on the field at any time during the match.

Teams played each other in a home-and-away season of 18 rounds; matches 12 to 17 were the "home-and-away reverse" of matches 1 to 6, and match 18 the "home-and-away reverse" of match 11.

Once the 18 round home-and-away season had finished, the 1927 VFL Premiers were determined by the specific format and conventions of the amended "Argus system".

== Home-and-away season ==
=== Round 1 ===
Home team	Home team score	Away team	Away team score	Venue	Crowd	Date
Melbourne	16.19 (115)	Richmond	9.11 (65)	MCG	22,382	30 April 1927
Collingwood	16.11 (107)	Geelong	12.12 (84)	Victoria Park	20,000	30 April 1927
Carlton	9.15 (69)	South Melbourne	10.10 (70)	Princes Park	28,000	30 April 1927
St Kilda	12.16 (88)	Hawthorn	11.2 (68)	Junction Oval	12,000	30 April 1927
North Melbourne	9.21 (75)	Fitzroy	10.11 (71)	Arden Street Oval	10,000	30 April 1927
Footscray	10.3 (63)	Essendon	16.14 (110)	Western Oval	18,000	30 April 1927

=== Round 2 ===
Home team	Home team score	Away team	Away team score	Venue	Crowd	Date
Richmond	8.11 (59)	St Kilda	6.12 (48)	Punt Road Oval	18,000	7 May 1927
Essendon	8.6 (54)	North Melbourne	10.5 (65)	Windy Hill	20,000	7 May 1927
South Melbourne	12.11 (83)	Melbourne	7.11 (53)	Lake Oval	25,000	7 May 1927
Geelong	14.20 (104)	Footscray	8.12 (60)	Corio Oval	15,300	7 May 1927
Hawthorn	7.9 (51)	Collingwood	11.11 (77)	Glenferrie Oval	9,000	7 May 1927
Fitzroy	11.6 (72)	Carlton	14.15 (99)	Brunswick Street Oval	25,000	7 May 1927

=== Round 3 ===
Home team	Home team score	Away team	Away team score	Venue	Crowd	Date
St Kilda	8.15 (63)	South Melbourne	7.13 (55)	Junction Oval	22,000	14 May 1927
Footscray	10.18 (78)	Hawthorn	7.10 (52)	Western Oval	11,000	14 May 1927
Collingwood	6.13 (49)	Richmond	7.13 (55)	Victoria Park	20,000	14 May 1927
Carlton	7.5 (47)	Essendon	4.12 (36)	Princes Park	27,000	14 May 1927
North Melbourne	8.5 (53)	Geelong	7.13 (55)	Arden Street Oval	20,000	14 May 1927
Melbourne	13.15 (93)	Fitzroy	8.11 (59)	MCG	14,931	14 May 1927

=== Round 4 ===
Home team	Home team score	Away team	Away team score	Venue	Crowd	Date
Hawthorn	8.8 (56)	North Melbourne	20.13 (133)	Glenferrie Oval	8,000	21 May 1927
Fitzroy	13.14 (92)	St Kilda	11.9 (75)	Brunswick Street Oval	16,000	21 May 1927
Essendon	8.12 (60)	Melbourne	11.12 (78)	Windy Hill	20,000	21 May 1927
Richmond	13.22 (100)	Footscray	3.12 (30)	Punt Road Oval	14,000	21 May 1927
South Melbourne	9.13 (67)	Collingwood	16.10 (106)	Lake Oval	29,000	21 May 1927
Geelong	18.15 (123)	Carlton	11.11 (77)	Corio Oval	16,000	21 May 1927

=== Round 5 ===
Home team	Home team score	Away team	Away team score	Venue	Crowd	Date
North Melbourne	5.8 (38)	Richmond	12.11 (83)	Arden Street Oval	18,000	28 May 1927
Footscray	7.13 (55)	South Melbourne	6.13 (49)	Western Oval	10,000	28 May 1927
Collingwood	18.15 (123)	Fitzroy	9.5 (59)	Victoria Park	16,000	28 May 1927
Carlton	14.12 (96)	Hawthorn	6.16 (52)	Princes Park	10,000	28 May 1927
Melbourne	7.16 (58)	Geelong	12.13 (85)	MCG	18,320	28 May 1927
St Kilda	14.7 (91)	Essendon	12.10 (82)	Junction Oval	16,000	28 May 1927

=== Round 6 ===
Home team	Home team score	Away team	Away team score	Venue	Crowd	Date
Hawthorn	12.8 (80)	Melbourne	17.10 (112)	Glenferrie Oval	10,000	4 June 1927
Geelong	12.17 (89)	St Kilda	11.4 (70)	Corio Oval	14,500	4 June 1927
Essendon	7.7 (49)	Collingwood	7.14 (56)	Windy Hill	25,000	4 June 1927
Fitzroy	8.13 (61)	Footscray	13.13 (91)	Brunswick Street Oval	15,000	6 June 1927
South Melbourne	14.13 (97)	North Melbourne	9.9 (63)	Lake Oval	25,000	6 June 1927
Richmond	12.18 (90)	Carlton	17.8 (110)	Punt Road Oval	42,000	6 June 1927

=== Round 7 ===
Home team	Home team score	Away team	Away team score	Venue	Crowd	Date
Melbourne	15.21 (111)	North Melbourne	3.9 (27)	MCG	12,075	11 June 1927
Essendon	9.10 (64)	Geelong	11.11 (77)	Windy Hill	16,000	11 June 1927
Collingwood	25.19 (169)	St Kilda	7.15 (57)	Victoria Park	16,000	11 June 1927
Carlton	10.6 (66)	Footscray	6.12 (48)	Princes Park	22,000	11 June 1927
South Melbourne	10.11 (71)	Richmond	15.17 (107)	Lake Oval	25,000	11 June 1927
Hawthorn	11.11 (77)	Fitzroy	15.13 (103)	Glenferrie Oval	7,000	11 June 1927

=== Round 8 ===
Home team	Home team score	Away team	Away team score	Venue	Crowd	Date
Geelong	22.23 (155)	Hawthorn	8.8 (56)	Corio Oval	8,500	18 June 1927
Fitzroy	14.11 (95)	South Melbourne	11.14 (80)	Brunswick Street Oval	10,000	18 June 1927
St Kilda	8.7 (55)	Melbourne	15.15 (105)	Junction Oval	14,000	18 June 1927
Richmond	15.12 (102)	Essendon	11.13 (79)	Punt Road Oval	25,000	18 June 1927
Footscray	4.12 (36)	Collingwood	7.16 (58)	Western Oval	17,000	18 June 1927
North Melbourne	4.11 (35)	Carlton	9.15 (69)	Arden Street Oval	15,000	18 June 1927

=== Round 9 ===
Home team	Home team score	Away team	Away team score	Venue	Crowd	Date
Hawthorn	9.6 (60)	Richmond	9.20 (74)	Glenferrie Oval	10,000	25 June 1927
Essendon	12.12 (84)	South Melbourne	15.9 (99)	Windy Hill	17,000	25 June 1927
St Kilda	15.7 (97)	North Melbourne	13.10 (88)	Junction Oval	13,000	25 June 1927
Melbourne	10.13 (73)	Footscray	7.9 (51)	MCG	15,171	25 June 1927
Geelong	12.15 (87)	Fitzroy	12.8 (80)	Corio Oval	13,500	25 June 1927
Collingwood	13.5 (83)	Carlton	14.11 (95)	Victoria Park	33,000	25 June 1927

=== Round 10 ===
Home team	Home team score	Away team	Away team score	Venue	Crowd	Date
Footscray	3.12 (30)	St Kilda	5.13 (43)	Western Oval	7,000	2 July 1927
Essendon	6.12 (48)	Fitzroy	7.6 (48)	Windy Hill	7,000	2 July 1927
Collingwood	8.11 (59)	North Melbourne	3.11 (29)	Victoria Park	7,000	2 July 1927
Carlton	8.7 (55)	Melbourne	10.10 (70)	Princes Park	13,000	2 July 1927
South Melbourne	13.19 (97)	Hawthorn	5.11 (41)	Lake Oval	5,000	2 July 1927
Richmond	9.15 (69)	Geelong	7.11 (53)	Punt Road Oval	15,000	2 July 1927

=== Round 11 ===
Home team	Home team score	Away team	Away team score	Venue	Crowd	Date
Geelong	10.12 (72)	South Melbourne	9.12 (66)	Corio Oval	13,500	9 July 1927
Fitzroy	8.7 (55)	Richmond	17.9 (111)	Brunswick Street Oval	18,000	9 July 1927
North Melbourne	9.18 (72)	Footscray	15.10 (100)	Arden Street Oval	12,000	9 July 1927
Hawthorn	9.17 (71)	Essendon	11.12 (78)	Glenferrie Oval	6,000	9 July 1927
Melbourne	10.12 (72)	Collingwood	11.13 (79)	MCG	27,092	9 July 1927
St Kilda	6.8 (44)	Carlton	21.9 (135)	Junction Oval	19,000	9 July 1927

=== Round 12 ===
Home team	Home team score	Away team	Away team score	Venue	Crowd	Date
Hawthorn	7.12 (54)	St Kilda	8.11 (59)	Glenferrie Oval	5,000	16 July 1927
Fitzroy	14.5 (89)	North Melbourne	10.14 (74)	Brunswick Street Oval	8,000	16 July 1927
Essendon	12.19 (91)	Footscray	8.9 (57)	Windy Hill	18,000	16 July 1927
Richmond	10.15 (75)	Melbourne	6.8 (44)	Punt Road Oval	35,000	16 July 1927
Geelong	7.7 (49)	Collingwood	9.11 (65)	Corio Oval	21,500	16 July 1927
South Melbourne	12.8 (80)	Carlton	8.21 (69)	Lake Oval	28,000	16 July 1927

=== Round 13 ===
Home team	Home team score	Away team	Away team score	Venue	Crowd	Date
Melbourne	20.20 (140)	South Melbourne	11.5 (71)	MCG	23,668	23 July 1927
Footscray	9.6 (60)	Geelong	10.19 (79)	Western Oval	12,500	23 July 1927
Collingwood	18.13 (121)	Hawthorn	6.11 (47)	Victoria Park	7,000	23 July 1927
Carlton	11.10 (76)	Fitzroy	9.16 (70)	Princes Park	21,000	23 July 1927
St Kilda	9.17 (71)	Richmond	16.14 (110)	Junction Oval	16,000	23 July 1927
North Melbourne	7.8 (50)	Essendon	7.12 (54)	Arden Street Oval	9,000	23 July 1927

=== Round 14 ===
Home team	Home team score	Away team	Away team score	Venue	Crowd	Date
Geelong	17.21 (123)	North Melbourne	3.11 (29)	Corio Oval	11,000	30 July 1927
Fitzroy	13.11 (89)	Melbourne	11.11 (77)	Brunswick Street Oval	15,500	30 July 1927
South Melbourne	13.20 (98)	St Kilda	8.9 (57)	Lake Oval	14,000	30 July 1927
Hawthorn	8.19 (67)	Footscray	11.19 (85)	Glenferrie Oval	5,000	30 July 1927
Richmond	9.7 (61)	Collingwood	12.12 (84)	Punt Road Oval	38,000	30 July 1927
Essendon	8.15 (63)	Carlton	10.11 (71)	Windy Hill	20,000	30 July 1927

=== Round 15 ===
Home team	Home team score	Away team	Away team score	Venue	Crowd	Date
Footscray	7.8 (50)	Richmond	11.15 (81)	Western Oval	15,500	6 August 1927
Collingwood	18.14 (122)	South Melbourne	6.7 (43)	Victoria Park	15,000	6 August 1927
Carlton	10.6 (66)	Geelong	13.20 (98)	Princes Park	30,000	6 August 1927
North Melbourne	11.10 (76)	Hawthorn	15.9 (99)	Arden Street Oval	4,000	6 August 1927
St Kilda	13.11 (89)	Fitzroy	11.16 (82)	Junction Oval	10,000	6 August 1927
Melbourne	20.20 (140)	Essendon	8.2 (50)	MCG	15,895	6 August 1927

=== Round 16 ===
Home team	Home team score	Away team	Away team score	Venue	Crowd	Date
Geelong	13.8 (86)	Melbourne	9.7 (61)	Corio Oval	17,200	27 August 1927
Essendon	9.18 (72)	St Kilda	7.6 (48)	Windy Hill	9,000	27 August 1927
Richmond	14.15 (99)	North Melbourne	9.8 (62)	Punt Road Oval	10,000	27 August 1927
South Melbourne	9.20 (74)	Footscray	10.10 (70)	Lake Oval	9,000	27 August 1927
Fitzroy	14.11 (95)	Collingwood	13.10 (88)	Brunswick Street Oval	25,000	27 August 1927
Hawthorn	10.10 (70)	Carlton	14.14 (98)	Glenferrie Oval	8,000	27 August 1927

=== Round 17 ===
Home team	Home team score	Away team	Away team score	Venue	Crowd	Date
North Melbourne	8.12 (60)	South Melbourne	11.12 (78)	Arden Street Oval	5,000	3 September 1927
Collingwood	3.13 (31)	Essendon	4.6 (30)	Victoria Park	8,000	3 September 1927
Carlton	4.6 (30)	Richmond	3.5 (23)	Princes Park	30,000	3 September 1927
Melbourne	10.13 (73)	Hawthorn	3.15 (33)	MCG	5,268	3 September 1927
St Kilda	9.18 (72)	Geelong	8.22 (70)	Junction Oval	8,000	3 September 1927
Footscray	15.11 (101)	Fitzroy	9.18 (72)	Western Oval	8,000	3 September 1927

=== Round 18 ===
Home team	Home team score	Away team	Away team score	Venue	Crowd	Date
Footscray	10.6 (66)	Melbourne	10.13 (73)	Western Oval	11,000	10 September 1927
Carlton	15.16 (106)	St Kilda	7.9 (51)	Princes Park	24,000	10 September 1927
Richmond	16.23 (119)	Hawthorn	6.17 (53)	Punt Road Oval	11,000	10 September 1927
South Melbourne	14.11 (95)	Geelong	15.15 (105)	Lake Oval	15,000	10 September 1927
Fitzroy	5.13 (43)	Essendon	14.10 (94)	Brunswick Street Oval	11,000	10 September 1927
North Melbourne	7.14 (56)	Collingwood	11.16 (82)	Arden Street Oval	11,000	10 September 1927

== Ladder ==
(P)	Premiers
	Qualified for finals

#	Team	P	W	L	D	PF	PA	%	Pts
1	Collingwood (P)	18	15	3	0	1559	1035	150.6	60
2	Richmond	18	14	4	0	1483	1102	134.6	56
3	Geelong	18	14	4	0	1594	1208	132.0	56
4	Carlton	18	13	5	0	1434	1178	121.7	52
5	Melbourne	18	12	6	0	1548	1169	132.4	48
6	South Melbourne	18	9	9	0	1373	1431	95.9	36
7	St Kilda	18	8	10	0	1178	1564	75.3	32
8	Essendon	18	6	11	1	1198	1237	96.8	26
9	Fitzroy	18	6	11	1	1335	1558	85.7	26
10	Footscray	18	6	12	0	1131	1325	85.4	24
11	North Melbourne	18	3	15	0	1085	1476	73.5	12
12	Hawthorn	18	1	17	0	1087	1722	63.1	4

Rules for classification: 1. premiership points; 2. percentage; 3. points for
Average score: 74.1
Source: AFL Tables

== Finals series ==
All of the 1927 finals were played at the MCG so the home team in the semi-finals and Preliminary Final is purely the higher ranked team from the ladder but in the Grand Final the home team was the team that won the Preliminary Final.

=== Semi-finals ===
Home team	Score	Away team	Score	Venue	Crowd	Date
Richmond	12.10 (82)	Carlton	11.10 (76)	MCG	63,620	17 September
Collingwood	16.18 (114)	Geelong	7.6 (48)	MCG	40,595	24 September

=== Grand final ===
Home team	Score	Away team	Score	Venue	Crowd	Date
Collingwood	2.13 (25)	Richmond	1.7 (13)	MCG	34,551	1 October

== Season notes ==
- In round 9, remembered as "Duncan's Match", Carlton's centre-halfback Alex Duncan took at least 33 marks (some claim he took as many as 45) in a single match.
- South Melbourne Football Club introduced a popular innovation: selling reserved grandstand seats.
- After the round 10 match, the Secretary of the Richmond Football Club, Percy "Pip" Page of "Page–McIntyre system fame, had his jaw broken in a fight that erupted during a club dance.
- The Grand Final was played under atrocious weather conditions on a Melbourne Cricket Ground that resembled a swamp. The two teams scored a combined 38 points, and it was the lowest combined score of any VFL/AFL game (Grand Final or otherwise) played in the 20th century. Including the four seasons played in the 19th century (1897–1900), it was the equal 11th lowest-scoring game of all time.

== Awards ==
- The 1927 VFL Premiership team was Collingwood.
- The VFL's leading goalkicker was Gordon Coventry of Collingwood with 97 goals.
- The winner of the 1927 Brownlow Medal was Syd Coventry of Collingwood with 7 votes.
- Hawthorn took the "wooden spoon" in 1927.
- The seconds premiership was won by Carlton for the second straight year. Carlton 12.22 (94) defeated South Melbourne 11.9 (75) in the challenge Grand Final, played as a stand-alone game on 8 October at the Melbourne Cricket Ground before a crowd of 4,210.

== Sources ==
- 1927 VFL season at AFL Tables
- 1927 VFL season at Australian Football
