= List of museums in Victoria (state) =

This list of museums in Victoria, Australia contains museums which are defined for this context as institutions (including nonprofit organizations, government entities, and private businesses) that collect and care for objects of cultural, artistic, scientific, or historical interest and make their collections or related exhibits available for public viewing. Also included are non-profit art galleries and university art galleries.

Name	Location	Region	Type	Summary
Allansford Cheese World Museum	Allansford		Farming	website, dairy farming, butter and cheese making
Alexandra Timber Tramway	Alexandra		Railway	website, heritage tramway, railroad and forestry museum
Altona Homestead Museum	Altona	Melbourne suburbs	Historic house	website, operated by the Altona Laverton Historical Society Inc
Ambleside Park Museum	Ferntree Gully	Melbourne suburbs	Local history	website, operated by the Knox Historical Society
Andrew Ross Museum	Kangaroo Ground	Shire of Nillumbik	Local history	website
Apollo Bay Museum	Apollo Bay	Southwest	Local history	website
Art Gallery of Ballarat	Ballarat	Goldfields	Art	Oldest and largest regional art gallery in Australia
Ararat Gallery TAMA	Ararat	Western District	Art	website Permanent collection specialises in contemporary textile fibre art
Australian Army Artillery Museum	Puckapunyal		Military	website, currently in storage awaiting new facility
Australian Army Museum, Bandiana	Bandiana	Northeast	Military	website, history of various corps of the Australian Army
Australian Army Signals Museum	Macleod	Melbourne suburbs	Military	website, history of the Royal Australian Corps of Signals
Australian National Surfing Museum	Torquay	Surf Coast Shire	Sports	website, tells the story of surfing
Australian National Veterans Arts Museum (ANVAM)	Southbank	Melbourne suburbs	Arts	website, Supporting wellbeing of Australia's veteran community through the Arts
Australian Pinball Museum	Nhill	Wimmera	Pinball machines	website
Australian Railway Historical Society	Williamstown North	Melbourne suburbs	Railway	Victorian Railways steam locomotives
Ballarat Tramway Museum	Ballarat	Goldfields	Railway	Electric and horse-drawn street tramways and trams
Barwon Grange	Newtown	Geelong suburbs	Historic house	website, operated by the National Trust of Australia, mid 19th century Victorian brick villa
Barwon Park	Winchelsea	Surf Coast Shire	Historic house	website, operated by the National Trust of Australia, mid 19th century 42-room mansion and stables
Bass Strait Shell Museum	Apollo Bay	Southwest	Natural history	information
Beechworth Gaol	Beechworth	Northeast	Prison	19th century former prison
Benalla Art Gallery	Benalla	Northeast	Art	Exhibits of Australian and international art
Benalla Costume and Pioneer Museum	Benalla	Northeast	Fashion	website, clothing dating from 1770 to the present with regularly changing exhibitions, also local history
Bendigo Art Gallery	Bendigo	Goldfields	Art	
Beleura	Mornington	Mornington Peninsula	Historic house	website, 20th century period mansion and gardens
Bonegilla Migrant Reception and Training Centre	Bonegilla		History	Post World War II migrant training camp
Broadmeadows Museum	Broadmeadows	Melbourne suburbs	Local history	website, operated by the Broadmeadows Historical Society
Buda Historic Home and Garden	Castlemaine	Goldfields	Historic house	website, features furnishings, decorative art objects, artworks and books dating from the goldrush era of the 1850s up until 1981
Bundoora Homestead Art Centre	Bundoora	Melbourne suburbs	Art	website, city's contemporary art gallery and exhibits of city history
Burke Museum (Australia)	Beechworth	Northeast	Local history	website, Aboriginal artefacts, Chinese mining community, 19th century streetscape, gold, Ned Kelly gang, natural history
Burrinja Cultural Centre	Upwey	Melbourne suburbs	Art	website, arts centre with exhibition, performing arts spaces
Cape Otway Lightstation	Cape Otway		Maritime	Lighthouse tours
Cape Schanck Lighthouse	Cape Schanck	Mornington Peninsula	Maritime	
HMAS Castlemaine	Williamstown	Melbourne suburbs	Maritime	World War II Bathurst class corvette museum ship
Castlemaine Art Museum	Castlemaine	Goldfields	Art	Australian art and local history
HMAS Cerberus Museum	HMAS Cerberus (naval base)	Mornington Peninsula	Maritime	website, history of the naval base and the Victorian Colonial Navy
Charlie's Arthur's Seat Auto Museum	Arthurs Seat	Mornington Peninsula	Automotive	information
Chiltern Athenaeum	Chiltern	Shire of Indigo	Literary	website, novels and publications by local authors, local history displays and memorabilia
Chiltern Motor Museum	Chiltern	Shire of Indigo	Automotive	information
Churchill Island Heritage Farm	Churchill Island		Farm	website, working heritage farm
Clunes Museum	Clunes	Goldfields	Local history	website, period room displays, agriculture, mining and woodworking items
Coal Creek Community Park and Museum	Korumburra	Gippsland	Open air	website
Cohuna & District Historical Society Museum	Cohuna	Northeast	Local history	website
Coleraine Car Museum	Coleraine	Western District	Automotive	information
Como House	South Yarra	Melbourne suburbs	Historic house	Operated by the National Trust of Australia, Colonial mansion and gardens
Convent Gallery	Daylesford	Goldfields	Art	Features eight individual galleries featuring new local and international artists, the original restored chapel, a museum with the history of the building set up by the nuns
Coolart Wetlands and Homestead Reserve	Somers	Mornington Peninsula	Historic house	Late 19th century mansion-like homestead, gardens and nature reserve
Creswick Museum	Creswick	Goldfields	Local history	website
Dow's Pharmacy	Chiltern	Shire of Indigo	Medical	website, operated by the National Trust of Australia, 19th century pharmacy in use until 1968
Dromana Historical Museum	Dromana	Mornington Peninsula	Local history	website, operated by the Dromana & District Historical Society
Echuca Historical Society Museum	Echuca		Local history	website
El Dorado Museum	Eldorado	Northeast	Local history	website, life and times from 1850 to 1950, including mining, farming and social history
Federal Standard Printing Works	Chiltern	Shire of Indigo	Media	website, operated by the National Trust of Australia, working printing press
Fire Services Museum Victoria	East Melbourne	Melbourne suburbs	Firefighting	website, includes uniforms, vehicles, equipment, memorabilia
Flagstaff Hill Maritime Village	Warrnambool	Southwest	Maritime	1870s maritime village with living history demonstrations
Flinders Historical Museum	Flinders	Mornington Peninsula	Local history	website, operated by the Flinders District Historical Society
Ford Discovery Centre	Geelong		Automotive	Heritage of the Ford Motor Company in Australia
Forestry Heritage Museum	Beechworth	Northeast	Forestry	website,
Fort Queenscliff	Queenscliff	Southwest	Military	Restored mid 19th century fort
Foster and District Historical Society Museum	Foster	Gippsland	Local history	website
Fox Classic Car Collection	Docklands	Melbourne suburbs	Automobile	website, classic cars including Bentley, Ferrari, Jaguar, Porsche and Mercedes Benz models
Geelong Art Gallery	Geelong		Art	Municipal regional art gallery
Geelong Maritime Museum	Geelong		Maritime	
Coal Creek Community Park and Museum	Sale	Gippsland	Open air	website
Gippsland Armed Forces Museum	Sale	Gippsland	Military	website
Gippsland Art Gallery	Sale	Gippsland	Art	website
Gippsland Regional Maritime Museum	Port Albert	Gippsland	Maritime	website, also known as Port Albert Maritime Museum
Gippsland Vehicle Collection	Maffra	Gippsland	Automotive	website
Golden Dragon Museum	Bendigo	Goldfields	Ethnic	History of Chinese people who immigrated to the region
Gulf Station	Yarra Glen	Yarra Valley	Historic house	website, operated by the National Trust of Australia, mid 19th century mansion and farm
Gum San Chinese Heritage Centre	Ararat	Western District	Ethnic	website, Chinese immigrant miners on the Victorian Goldfields in the mid-1800s
Hamilton Gallery	Hamilton	Western District	Art	website
Hastings-Western Port Historical Society	Hastings	Mornington Peninsula	Local history	website, operated by the Hastings – Western Port Historical Society
Heide Museum of Modern Art	Bulleen	Melbourne suburbs	Art	Contemporary art museum
The Heights Heritage House	Newtown	Geelong suburbs	Historic house	website, website, operated by the National Trust of Australia
Horsham Regional Art Gallery	Horsham	Wimmera	Art	website
J Ward	Ararat	Western District	Prison	Former prison used to house the criminally insane
Kerrisdale Mountain Railway & Museum	Kerrisdale		Railway	website, heritage railway and steam museum
Kyneton Museum	Kyneton	Shire of Macedon Ranges	Local history	website
Labassa	Caulfield North	Melbourne suburbs	Historic house	website, operated by the National Trust of Australia, 19th century mansion
Lake View House	Chiltern	Shire of Indigo	Historic house	website, operated by the National Trust of Australia, childhood home of author Henry Handel Richardson
Lakeside Antique Machinery Museum	Glenmaggie	Gippsland	Technology	information, steam engines, tractors, combustion engines, saws, farm machines
Langi Morgala Museum	Ararat	Western District	Local history	website, operated by the Ararat and District Historical Society
Latrobe Regional Gallery	Morwell	Gippsland	Art	website
Lilydale & District Historical Society Museum	Lilydale	Yarra Valley	Local history	website
Maffra Sugar Beet Museum	Maffra	Gippsland	Local history	website, features history of the area sugar beet industry, also a separate dairy interpretive centre
Maldon Museum	Maldon	Goldfields	Local history	website
Maldon Vintage Machinery Museum	Maldon	Goldfields	Technology	website
Mallacoota Bunker Museum	Mallacoota	Gippsland	Local history	information, operated by the Mallacoota & District Historical Society, World War II bunker with local history displays
Maroondah Art Gallery	Ringwood	Melbourne suburbs	Art	website, municipal art gallery
McCrae Homestead	McCrae	Mornington Peninsula	Historic house	Operated by the National Trust of Australia, mid 19th century homestead
Melbourne Steam Traction Engine Club	Scoresby	Melbourne suburbs	Technology	Industrial machinery and steam engines
Melbourne Tram Museum @ Hawthorn Depot	Hawthorn	Melbourne suburbs	Railway	Features over 20 fully restored trams in a depot
Melbourne Tramway Museum	Bylands	Shire of Mitchell	Railway	Operated by the Tramway Museum Society of Victoria, trams from Melbourne, Geelong, Ballarat and Adelaide
Melbourne's Living Museum of the West	Maribyrnong	Melbourne suburbs	Local history	Area history, culture, natural history
Monash Gallery of Art	Wheelers Hill	Melbourne suburbs	Art	Municipal art and photography gallery
Mooramong	Skipton	Western District	Historic house	website, operated by the National Trust of Australia, home of D.J.S (Scobie) Mackinnon and film star Claire Adams, also working farm and nature reserve
Mornington Old Post Office Museum	Mornington	Mornington Peninsula	Local history	website, operated by the Mornington Historical Society
Mornington Peninsula Regional Gallery	Mornington	Mornington Peninsula	Art	Exhibits Australian and international art
Mont De Lancey Homestead and Museum	Wandin North	Yarra Valley	Historic house	website
Mulberry Hill (Langwarrin South, Victoria)	Langwarrin South		Historic house	website, operated by the National Trust of Australia, home of artist Daryl Lindsay and author Joan Lindsay, features collection of Australian art, Georgian furniture and glassware, and Staffordshire ceramics
Museo Italiano	Carlton	Melbourne suburbs	Ethnic	website, experience of Italian migration and the culture created by Italians in Australia
National Alpine Museum of Australia	Mount Buller		Sports	Ski history
National Communication Museum	Hawthorn	Melbourne suburbs	Communication	Previously the Victorian Telecommunications Museum, it houses the speaking clock formerly used by Telecom Australia (Telstra)
National Holden Motor Museum	Echuca		Automotive	website, Holden cars
National Wool Museum (Geelong)	Geelong		Industry	Australia's wool industry from raising sheep to creating fabric
National Vietnam Veterans Museum	Newhaven	Phillip Island	Military	website, weapons, aircraft, vehicles and equipment, uniforms, dioramas, photos, art
Ned Kelly Museum	Glenrowan	Northeast	Biographical	website, history of bushranger Ned Kelly's last stand
Old Gippstown	Moe	Gippsland	Open air	Pioneer township portraying the settlement era of Gippsland
Pioneer Settlement Swan Hill	Swan Hill		Open air	website, features over 50 original and replica heritage buildings
Port Fairy History Centre	Port Fairy	Southwest	Local history	website, operated by the Port Fairy Historical Society
Portarlington Mill	Portarlington	Bellarine Peninsula	Mill	website, operated by the National Trust of Australia, historic flour mill with local history displays
Portland Maritime Discovery Centre	Portland, Victoria		Maritime	website
Portland Powerhouse Motor & Car Museum	Portland, Victoria		Automotive	information, information
Post Office Gallery	Ballarat	Goldfields	Art	Gallery housed in an historic post office
Queenscliffe Historical Museum	Queenscliff	Southwest	Local history	website
Queenscliffe Maritime Museum	Queenscliff	Southwest	Maritime	
Rippon Lea Estate	Elsternwick	Melbourne suburbs	Historic house	Operated by the National Trust of Australia, 19th century mansion and gardens
Royal Australian Armoured Corps Memorial and Army Tank Museum	Puckapunyal		Military	Over 70 tanks, armoured fighting vehicles and history of the Royal Australian Armoured Corps
Royal Australian Army Pay Corps Museum	Macleod	Melbourne suburbs	Military	website, history of the Royal Australian Army Pay Corps
Sale Historical Museum	Sale	Gippsland	Local history	information, operated by the Sale Historical Society
Schramm's Cottage Museum Complex	Doncaster East	Melbourne suburbs	Local History	website, operated by the Doncaster Templestowe Historical Society. Includes the stone Schramm's Cottage, the Waldau Cemetery and a farm equipment collection.
Schwerkolt Cottage	Mitcham	Melbourne suburbs	Historic house	Operated by the Whitehorse Historical Society, late 19th century pioneer stone cottage and outbuildings
Seymour Railway Heritage Centre	Seymour		Railway	
Shepparton Art Museum	Shepparton	Northeast	Art	website
Shepparton Heritage Centre	Shepparton	Northeast	Local History	website
Sir Reginald Ansett Transport Museum	Hamilton	Western District	Aviation	website, birthplace of the Ansett transport empire
Smythesdale Court House	Smythesdale	Goldfields	Local history	website, open by appointment with the Woady Yaloak Historical Society
Sorrento Museum	Sorrento	Mornington Peninsula	Local history	Operated by the Nepean Historical Society, museum, library and gallery
Sovereign Hill	Ballarat	Goldfields	Open air	Depicts Ballarat's first ten years after the discovery of gold in 1851, includes the Gold Museum about the Australian gold rushes of the 1850s
State Coal Mine	Wonthaggi	Gippsland	Mining	20th century coal mine with buildings, equipment and underground tours
Stawell Historical Society Museum	Stawell	Wimmera	Local history	website
Steamrail Victoria	Newport	Melbourne suburbs	Railway	
St Arnaud Historical Museum	St Arnaud	Goldfields	Local history	website, operated by the St Arnaud Historical Society
Surf World Museum	Torquay		Sports	website, Australia's contribution to the development of surfing around the world
Swan Hill Regional Art Gallery	Swan Hill		Art	Collections include Naïve art, Australian works on paper, prints and drawings
TarraWarra Museum of Art	Healesville	Yarra Valley	Art	website, Australian art from the second half of the twentieth century to the present day
Tasma Gallery	East Melbourne	Melbourne suburbs	Art	website, operated by the National Trust of Australia
The Bible Museum	St Arnaud	Goldfields	Literary	website, features over 1400 Bibles, together with models and artefacts associated with the Bible message
Tiger Moth World	Torquay		Aerospace	website, theme park and museum based on the de Havilland Tiger Moth
Upper Yarra Museum	Yarra Junction	Yarra Valley	Local history	website
Victorian Jazz Archive	Wantirna	Melbourne suburbs	Music	Australian jazz heritage
Villa Alba	Kew	Melbourne suburbs	Historic house	website, late 19th century mansion under restoration
Walhalla Museum	Walhalla			
Wangaratta Art Gallery	Wangaratta	Northeast	Art	website
Wangaratta Museum	Wangaratta	Northeast	Local history	website, operated by the Wangaratta Historical Society
Warrandyte Post Office Museum	Warrandyte	Melbourne suburbs	Local history	website, operated by the Warrandyte Historical Society
Warrnambool Art Gallery	Warrnambool	Southwest	Art	website
Werribee Park	Werribee	Melbourne suburbs	Historic house	Includes late 19th century mansion, gardens, an equestrian centre, a zoo and a contemporary sculpture walk
Whitehorse Art Space	Box Hill	Melbourne suburbs	Art	website, municipal art gallery located in town hall
Williamstown Historical Society Museum	Williamstown	Melbourne suburbs	Local history	website
Worsley Cottage Complex	Maryborough	Goldfields	Historic house	website, operated by the Maryborough Midlands Historical Society
Yackandandah Museum	Yackandandah	Northeast	Local history	website, operated by the Yackandandah and District Historical Society
Yarra Ranges Regional Museum	Lilydale	Melbourne suburbs	Local history	website, cultural heritage of the Yarra Ranges region

== See also ==
- List of museums in Australia
