= Former Fire Station =

Former Fire Station may refer to:

in Australia

- Former Fire Station (Walhalla, Victoria), Victoria Heritage Register

in the United States

- Former Fire Station (Windsor, Connecticut), listed on the National Register of Historic Places (NRHP)

== See also ==
- List of fire stations, which includes numerous former fire stations
