= Queenscliffe Museum =

Queenscliffe Museum may refer to:

- Queenscliffe Historical Museum
- Queenscliffe Maritime Museum
