= 1925 VFL grand final =

Grand final of the 1925 Victorian Football League season

1925 VFL Grand Final

Geelong	Collingwood
10.19 (79)	9.15 (69)
	1	2	3	4
GEE	3.2 (20)	7.8 (50)	10.13 (73)	10.19 (79)
COLL	2.5 (17)	4.9 (33)	6.12 (48)	9.15 (69)
- Date: 10 October 1925
- Stadium: Melbourne Cricket Ground
- Attendance: 64,288
- Umpires: Jack McMurray Sr.

The 1925 VFL Grand Final was an Australian rules football game contested between the Geelong Football Club and Collingwood Football Club, held at the Melbourne Cricket Ground in Melbourne on 10 October 1925. It was the 27th annual grand final of the Victorian Football League, staged to determine the premiers for the 1925 VFL season. The match, attended by 64,288 spectators, was won by Geelong by a margin of 10 points, marking that club's first VFL premiership victory.

Geelong, competing in their first VFL grand final, had been the best side all season, having lost only two games on their way to the minor premiership and at one stage put together a sequence of 12 successive wins. Collingwood on the other hand had only made the finals on percentage, a spot only cemented when they defeated South Melbourne by 65 points in the final round.

Geelong outscored Collingwood in each of the first three quarters to open up a 25-point lead going into the final term. Collingwood finished strongly but Geelong held on to claim its first VFL premiership. Captain-coach Cliff Rankin starred with five goals.

Tom Fitzmaurice had extra reason to celebrate, as it was his 100th VFL match and his third successive premiership, having won flags in the previous two seasons at Essendon.

== Score ==
Team	1	2	3	Final
Geelong	3.2	7.8	10.13	10.19 (79)
Collingwood	2.5	4.9	6.12	9.15 (69)

== Teams ==
Geelong	Collingwood

Geelong
B:	Les Smith	Keith Johns	Dave Ferguson
HB:	Bill Hudd	Tom Fitzmaurice	Ken Leahy
C:	Edward Stevenson	Edward Greeves	Jack Williams
HF:	Arthur Rayson	George Todd	Jack Chambers
F:	Cliff Rankin (c)	Lloyd Hagger	Syd Hall
Foll:	Eric Fleming	Denis Heagney	Jim Warren
Coach:	Cliff Rankin		

Collingwood
B:	George Beasley	Charlie Dibbs	Jim Shanahan
HB:	Charlie Tyson (c)	Bob Makeham	Ernie Wilson
C:	Charlie Milburn	Harry Chesswas	Leo Wescott
HF:	John Harris	Frank Murphy	Jim Lawn
F:	Les Stainsby	Gordon Coventry	Reg Baker
Foll:	Syd Coventry	Laurie Murphy	Reynolds Webb
Coach:	Jock McHale		

- Umpire – Jack McMurray Sr.

== Statistics ==
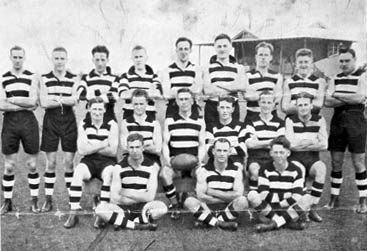
Geelong FC team, premiers

=== Goalkickers ===
Geelong:

- Rankin 5
- Chambers 1
- Hagger 1
- Hall 1
- Heagney 1
- Stevenson 1

Collingwood:

- F. Murphy 2
- Stainsby 2
- Webb 2
- Baker 1
- Chesswas 1
- Tyson 1

== Aftermath ==
In describing the scenes following Geelong's first VFL premiership and the club's first premiership since 1886 (in the VFA), The Age reported:

The scene in the Geelong dressing-room was remarkable. The players who had succeeded, where teams for 39 years had failed, seemed to be the coolest men there. They had just come out of a strenuous contest, and were besieged by enthusiastic supporters, but they accepted the plaudits with becoming modesty. Not one of them had been in a premiership team, save Tom Fitzmaurice, who played with Essendon in their last two premierships, and not one of them was alive when Geelong last gained the honours.

== See also ==
- 1925 VFL season
