= David Ferguson =

David or Dave Ferguson may refer to:

- David Ferguson (reformer) (died 1598), Scottish religious reformer
- David Ferguson (Australian politician) (1844–1891)
- David Ferguson (geologist) (c. 1857–1936), Scottish explorer, mining engineer and prospector
- Sir David Ferguson (judge) (1861–1941), Australian judge
- Dave Ferguson (footballer, born 1875) (1875–1920), Australian rules footballer for Essendon
- Dave Ferguson (footballer, born 1903) (1903–1975), Australian rules footballer for Geelong and North Melbourne
- David Ferguson (impresario) (1947–2015), American promoter and outsider-culture impresario
- David R. Ferguson (born 1962), American sound engineer and record producer
- Dave Ferguson (boxer) (born 1976), British boxer
- David Ferguson (volleyball) (born 1982), Australian volleyball player
- David Ferguson (footballer, born 1994), English footballer for Hartlepool United
- David Ferguson (footballer, born 1996), Scottish footballer for Berwick Rangers

== See also ==
- David Fergusson (disambiguation)
- David Ferguson Hunter (1891–1965), Scottish soldier and recipient of the Victoria Cross
- Samuel David Ferguson (1842–1916), African American bishop
