= Francis Scully =

Francis or Frank Scully is the name of:

- Francis Scully (politician) (1820–1864), Irish politician, Member of Parliament, 1847–1857
- Francis Scully (sailor) (1925–1998), American yachtsman and Olympic medallist
- Francis Scully, fictional Liverpool youth, title character of Scully
- Frank Scully (1892–1964), American journalist and author
- Frank Scully (politician) (1920–2015), Australian politician, Member of the Victorian Legislative Assembly, 1949–1958
- Frank Scully (footballer) (1899–1980), Australian rules footballer
