= List of places on the Victorian Heritage Register in the Borough of Queenscliffe =

This is a list of places on the Victorian Heritage Register in the Borough of Queenscliffe in Victoria, Australia. The Victorian Heritage Register is maintained by the Heritage Council of Victoria.

The Victorian Heritage Register, as of 2020, lists the following 16 state-registered places within the Borough of Queenscliffe:

Place name	Place #	Location	Suburb or Town	Co-ordinates	Built	State registered	Photo
Arilpa	H1132	77 Glaneuse Rd	Point Lonsdale	38.281400°S 144.610340°E	1913	23 May 1996	
Ballara	H1126	57-73 Glaneuse Rd	Point Lonsdale	38.282700°S 144.610140°E	1907-08	21 December 1995	
Fisherman's Shed	H2074	1 Weeroona Pde and 2 Wharf St	Queenscliff	38.264630°S 144.667470°E	unknown	10 February 2005	
Lathamstowe	H1052	44 Gellibrand St	Queenscliff	38.269070°S 144.661380°E	1882-83	8 September 1994	
Ozone Hotel	H1142	42 Gellibrand St	Queenscliff	38.268720°S 144.661270°E	1881	14 December 1995	
Pilots' Cottages	H1618	60-62 Gellibrand St	Queenscliff	38.270460°S 144.660650°E	1853-54	20 August 1982	
Point Lonsdale Maritime and Defence Precinct	H1517	2 Point Lonsdale Rd	Point Lonsdale	38.290920°S 144.613600°E	1850s	20 August 1982	
Queenscliff Hotel	H1141	16 Gellibrand St	Queenscliff	38.266460°S 144.662510°E	1887	14 December 1995	
Queenscliff Pier and Lifeboat Complex	H1515	Symonds St	Queenscliff	38.267600°S 144.667440°E	1884-89	20 August 1982	
Queenscliff railway station	H1586	20 Symonds St	Queenscliff	38.264320°S 144.662360°E	1881	20 August 1982	
Rosenfeld	H1134	26 King St	Queenscliff	38.269980°S 144.657350°E	1859	14 December 1995	
Roseville Cottage	H1148	42 Mercer St	Queenscliff	38.268440°S 144.656680°E	1863-64	29 February 1996	
Shortlands Bluff	H2367	133-135 Hesse St	Queenscliff	38.273310°S 144.658830°E	1840s	21 February 2019	
St George the Martyr Church and Parish Hall	H1125	16-26 Hobson St	Queenscliff	38.266020°S 144.659430°E	1863-64	30 November 1995	
Warringah	H1177	80 Mercer St	Queenscliff	38.271530°S 144.655290°E	c. 1860	18 April 1996	
Wreck Bell	H2070	Princes Park cnr Wharf St and Gellibrand St	Queenscliff	38.265240°S 144.664140°E	1891	9 December 2004	
