= Queenscliff Football Netball Club =

Queenscliff

Names
- Full name: Queenscliff Football and Netball Club Inc.
- Nickname(s): Coutas, Barracoutas
- Former nickname: 'Cliff

Club details
- Founded: 1884; 142 years ago
- Colours
- Competition: Bellarine Football Netball League
- President: Ali Waight
- Coach: Heath Jamieson
- Captain: Caleb Whitley
- Premierships: BFL (5): 1975; 2011; 2012; 2013; 2026; PFL (7): 1961; 1962; 1963; 1964; 1965; 1967; 1968; GFA (2): 1929; 1937; QBFA (7): 1904; 1905; 1907; 1908; 1910; 1913; 1920; QFA (4): 1899; 1900; 1901; 1902
- Ground: Queenscliff Recreation Reserve

Uniforms
Home	Away	Clash

Other information
- Official website: qfnc.com.au

The Queenscliff Football Netball Club, nicknamed the Coutas, is an Australian rules football and netball club situated in the township of Queenscliff, Victoria, on the Bellarine Peninsula.

Queenscliff's teams currently play in the Bellarine Football Netball League, of which the club is a founding member. The club's unique nickname is short for barracouta, a type of fish. The Coutas play their home games at the Queenscliff Recreation Reserve, which is enclosed inside a local caravan park. The football oval is colloquially referred to as the 'Couta Bowl', lending to its uneven, sloped and bowl-like playing surface.

== History ==
Evidence of a Queenscliff club playing football dates back to as early as 1882, where the Geelong Advertiser reported that they had lost a 'return match' against Drysdale. The club lists its official establishment date as 1884. The Coutas played in an early version of the Bellarine Football League that ran from 1895 to 1914. Reformed after World War I, the club continued to play locally until 1923 when it joined the Geelong Football Association where it enjoyed some success.

Queenscliff played the 1957 season in the Polwarth Football League and continued in this league until the Bellarine & District Football League was formed in 1971. During its years in the Polwarth league, Queenscliff dominated with Kevin Coltish at full-forward, winning seven premierships in eight seasons.

After the formation of the Bellarine league in 1971, Queenscliff remained a power club for some time, winning a premiership in 1975. But after that achievement, a 36-year premiership drought followed. Queenscliff's return to greatness came in 2011 when the club won its second BFL premiership, repeating the feat in 2012 and 2013 to mark a rare three-peat.

== Premierships ==
- Queenscliff Football Association (4):
  - 1899, 1900, 1901, 1902
- Queenscliff & Bellarine Football Association (7):
  - 1904, 1905, 1907, 1908, 1910, 1913, 1920
- Geelong Football Association (2):
  - 1929, 1937
- Polwarth Football League (7):
  - 1961, 1962, 1963, 1964, 1965, 1967, 1968
- Bellarine Football League (5):
  - 1975, 2011, 2012, 2013, 2026

== League best and fairests ==
- 1952: Keith Wayth
- 1954: Keith Wayth
- 1976: Robert Warren
- 1977: Mike Birrell
- 1978: Mike Birrell
- 1988: Dean McNeil
- 1993: Jamie Dalton
- 2003: Matt Primmer
- 2011: Dylan Chaplin-Burch

== Notable VFL/AFL players ==
Queenscliff provided a pathway for many footballers to join the top league in the early decades of the VFL. Notably, one-fifth of Geelong's 1925 premiership team was recruited from the club.

Players to have been recruited from Queenscliff to the VFL/AFL include:

- Peter Stephens with Geelong
- Bill Hudd with Geelong, Essendon and Hawthorn
- Syd Hall with Geelong
- George Todd with Geelong
- Jim Warren with Geelong
- Ron Shapter with South Melbourne, Fitzroy and Essendon
- Ted Hoppen with St Kilda
- Arnie Bench with Fitzroy
- Terry Farman with Geelong
- Darcy Gardiner with Brisbane
- Jhye Clark with Geelong

== Bibliography ==
- Cat Country: History of Football in the Geelong Region by John Stoward – Aussie Footy Books, 2008 – ISBN 9780957751583
