= Di Rule =

Australian politician

Mayor of the Borough of Queenscliffe
- Incumbent
- Assumed office 25 November 2024
- Deputy: Brendan Monahan
- Preceded by: Ross Ebbels

Councillor of the Borough of Queenscliffe
- Incumbent
- Assumed office 26 October 2024

Personal details
- Born: Dianne Etches; 1959 or 1960 (age 66)
- Party: Liberal
- Spouse: Andrew Rule

Dianne Rule (born Dianne Etches, 1959 or 1960) is an Australian politician who currently serves as a councillor and mayor of the Borough of Queenscliffe. A member of the Victorian Liberal Party, she has twice unsuccessfully stood as a candidate in state elections, and served as an advisor to Liberal leader Ted Baillieu. Rule has worked in a number of positions in the public and private sector.

== Early life ==
Dianne Etches grew up in the Borough of Queenscliffe, attending Point Lonsdale Primary School and Queenscliff High School before leaving for university. While her exact date of birth is unclear, she was aged 39 as of July 1999 and 64 as of October 2024, meaning she was born in either 1959 or 1960. Her brother is Brendan Etches, a former cadet in the Australian Army.

== Career ==
Rule worked as an electoral officer for Karen Synon during Synon's brief tenure in the Australian Senate. Rule first stood as a political candidate at the 1999 Victorian state election, in the Legislative Assembly district of Seymour, representing the Liberal Party. She defeated Kennett staffer Gavin Clancy and former MP Max Turner in a Liberal preselection ballot. Although Rule polled a plurality of primary votes in the election, she was overtaken by Labor candidate Ben Hardman following the distribution of preferences. At the 2002 state election, she contested Burwood for the Liberal Party, but came second on primary votes to Labor incumbent Bob Stensholt, falling further behind after the final two-party-preferred count.

Rule was an electorate officer for Ted Baillieu, and was appointed as Baillieu's senior adviser after he was elected leader of the Victorian Liberal Party in May 2006. She has served in a number of public service positions. She was a board member at the Victorian Registration and Qualifications Authority from 2011 to 2014, having been appointed by the Baillieu government, and Dental Health Services Victoria from 2013 to 2016. She also sat on advisory councils for Cancer Australia from 2015 to 2018 and the Australian Broadcasting Corporation from 2020 to 2024. In the private sector, Rule was made the chair of the James Macready-Bryan (JMB) Foundation in 2015, staying in the position until 2021. The JMB Foundation was established in 2006 to help young people with brain injuries. Rule was a director of the Coalition for Conservation, a charity designed to advocate for action on climate change from a conservative perspective, but resigned in 2022, stating the group had a lack of transparency around external funding.

Rule stood as a candidate for the 2024 Victorian local elections, contesting the sole multi-member ward in the Borough of Queenscliffe. Rule was not endorsed by any political party, although she remained a member of the Liberal Party. She stated her support for a platform of value for ratepayers and protecting the environment of the borough. Rule was elected as the fourth candidate in the five-member ward, becoming a councillor for the Borough of Queenscliffe. Following a special council meeting in November 2024, Rule was elected as the mayor of the Borough of Queenscliffe for a one-year term, alongside deputy mayor Brendan Monahan. She succeeded Ross Ebbels, who had been unsuccessful in his bid for re-election to council.

== Personal life ==
Rule has three children. She is married to Andrew Rule, a journalist who has worked for the The Age and the Herald Sun, and lives in Point Lonsdale.
