= Syd Hall (footballer, born 1902) =

Australian rules footballer

Personal information
- Full name: Thomas Sydney Hall
- Born: 8 June 1902
- Died: 23 May 1973 (aged 70)
- Original team: Queenscliff
- Height: 173 cm (5 ft 8 in)
- Weight: 70 kg (154 lb)

Playing career^{1}
Years	Club	Games (Goals)
1922–1927, 1930	Geelong	85 (18)
- ^{1} Playing statistics correct to the end of 1930.

Thomas Sydney Hall (8 June 1902 – 23 May 1973) was an Australian rules footballer who played with Geelong in the Victorian Football League (VFL).

Hall was a regular fixture in the Geelong team from 1924 to 1927, before embarking on a stint with Ararat. He played as a forward pocket in Geelong's 1925 premiership side. He returned in the 1930 VFL season but it would be his last year at the club.

His father, Syd Hall, played for Preston and Essendon.
