= David Fergusson =

David Fergusson may refer to:

- David Fergusson (psychologist) (1944−2018), New Zealand professor of psychology
- David Fergusson (theologian) (born 1956), Scottish theologian

== See also ==
- David Ferguson (disambiguation)
