= Bill Hudd =

Australian rules footballer, born 1901

Personal information
- Full name: William Wyatt Hudd
- Nickname: Chunga
- Born: 28 November 1901; Queenscliff, Victoria
- Died: 5 August 1960 (aged 58); Geelong
- Original team: Queenscliff
- Height: 182 cm (6 ft 0 in)
- Weight: 85 kg (187 lb)

Playing career^{1}
Years	Club	Games (Goals)
1922–1925	Geelong	28 (3)
1926–1927	Essendon	29 (5)
1928	Yarraville	12 (4)
1929–1930	Hawthorn	26 (5)
1931	Sandringham	12 (11)
- ^{1} Playing statistics correct to the end of 1931.

William Wyatt Hudd (28 November 1901 – 5 August 1960) was an Australian rules footballer who played with Geelong, Essendon and Hawthorn in the Victorian Football League (VFL).

== Football ==
Mostly a defender, Hudd started his career at Queenscliff before moving to Geelong and becoming a half back flanker in their 1925 premiership side.

He joined Essendon in 1926, spending two seasons there before taking a break from the VFL and playing at VFA club Yarraville.

In 1929 he returned to the league with Hawthorn, playing for two years there and then moving to Sandringham before retiring in 1931 after 83 VFL games.
