= Harry Smith (footballer, born 1893) =

Australian rules footballer

Personal information
- Full name: James Henderson Smith
- Born: 1 April 1893; Bendigo, Victoria
- Died: 3 July 1960 (aged 67); Queenscliff, Victoria
- Original team: Prahran
- Height: 180 cm (5 ft 11 in)
- Weight: 82 kg (181 lb)

Playing career^{1}
Years	Club	Games (Goals)
1915–16	Fitzroy	6 (0)
1922	Geelong	3 (2)
Total		9 (2)
- ^{1} Playing statistics correct to the end of 1922.

James Henderson 'Harry' Smith (1 April 1893 – 3 July 1960) was an Australian rules footballer who played with Fitzroy and Geelong in the Victorian Football League (VFL).

== Family ==
Smith was born James Maddock Horatio Smith in Bendigo in 1893, the youngest son of Horatio Fellows Smith (1852–1907) and Frances Louisa Smith, nee Snook (1852–1911). During his adult life, he used the name James Henderson Smith. He married Sarah Todd in 1916.

== Football ==
Smith commenced his senior football career with Prahran in 1912 in the Victorian Football Association, before transferring to Fitzroy early in the 1915 season. He made his Fitzroy debut in his first week at the club, the Round 6 Football Record stating “Stone was an absentee from the Fitzroy team last Saturday. Smith, late of Prahran, filled the vacancy, and for his first game in League football shaped well. He found the slippery ball hard to handle at times.” He played a total of six games over the two seasons he was with Fitzroy, but failed to secure a regular place in the side.

Smith moved to Queenscliff and after becoming a leading player in the Bellarine competition, was invited to train with Geelong in 1922. He played regularly with the Geelong second eighteen but again failed to establish himself in the senior team, making a total of three appearances for Geelong in the VFL.

== Post-football ==
Smith and his wife ran a boarding house at 31 Hesse St, Queenscliff for over 30 years. He died in Queenscliff in 1960.
