= Les Stainsby =

Australian rules footballer

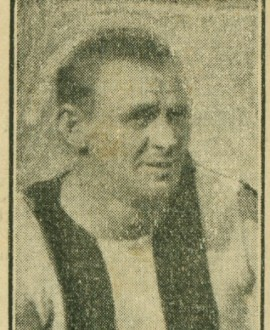
- Stainsby during his Collingwood career

Personal information
- Full name: Leslie Arthur Stainsby
- Born: 7 June 1898; Mortlake, Victoria
- Died: 29 April 1942 (aged 43); Prahran, Victoria
- Original team: Coolamon
- Height: 170 cm (5 ft 7 in)
- Weight: 73 kg (161 lb)

Playing career^{1}
Years	Club	Games (Goals)
1925–1926	Collingwood	23 (35)
1927	Richmond	2 (2)
Total		25 (37)
- ^{1} Playing statistics correct to the end of 1927.

Leslie Arthur Stainsby (7 June 1898 – 29 April 1942) was an Australian rules footballer who played with Collingwood and Richmond in the Victorian Football League (VFL).

Stainsby spent two seasons at Collingwood, after arriving at the club from New South Wales club Coolamon. In the first he kicked 29 goals, two of them in the 1925 VFL Grand Final, to finish second in Collingwood's goal-kicking, behind Gordon Coventry. He played for Richmond in the 1927 VFL season.
