= Terry Farman =

Australian rules footballer

Personal information
- Full name: Terry P. Farman
- Born: 4 January 1946 (age 80)
- Original team: Queenscliff
- Height: 183 cm (6 ft 0 in)
- Weight: 78 kg (172 lb)

Playing career^{1}
Years	Club	Games (Goals)
1965–1973	Geelong	133 (9)
- ^{1} Playing statistics correct to the end of 1973.

Terry Farman (born 4 January 1946) is a former Australian rules footballer who played with Geelong in the Victorian Football League (VFL).

Farman was a defender, recruited to Geelong from the nearby Queenscliff Football Club. He played every game in the 1967 VFL season, including the grand final, where he was one of Geelong's half back flankers in a losing team. In 1969 he played in the opening 15 rounds before he was struck down with tonsillitis, ending a run of 58 consecutive games. He continued to be a regular fixture in the side over the next two seasons but would then struggle with injuries.
