= Jhye Clark =

Australian rules footballer (born 2004)

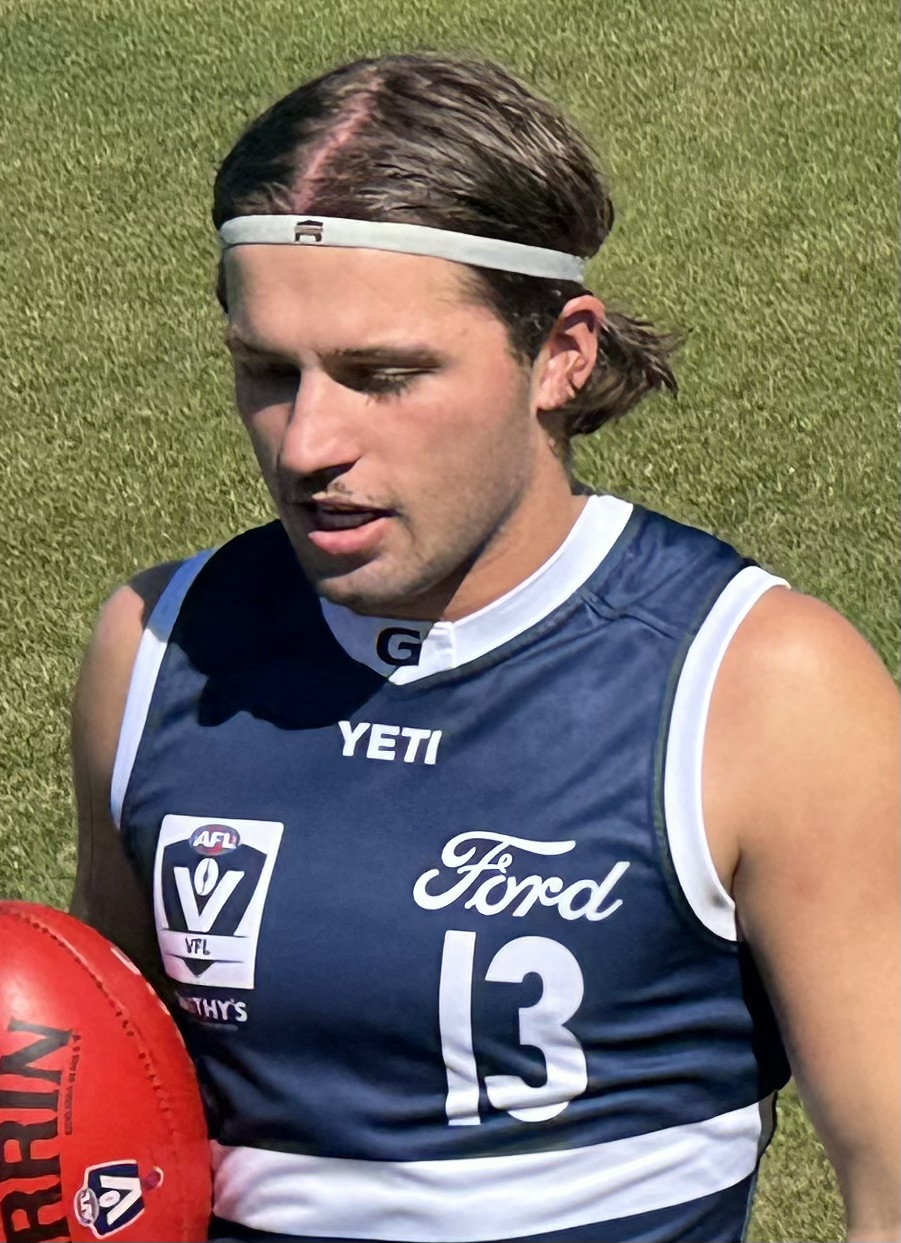
- Clark in June 2026

Personal information
- Full name: Jhye Clark
- Born: 23 July 2004 (age 22)
- Original team: Queenscliff / Geelong Falcons
- Draft: No. 8, 2022 national draft
- Height: 181 cm (5 ft 11 in)
- Weight: 77 kg (170 lb)
- Position: Midfielder

Club information
- Current club: Geelong
- Number: 13

Playing career^{1}
Years	Club	Games (Goals)
2023–	Geelong	35 (6)
- ^{1} Playing statistics correct to the end of 2026.

Jhye Clark (born 23 July 2004) is a professional Australian rules footballer playing for the Geelong Football Club in the Australian Football League (AFL). He was drafted by Geelong with their first pick in the 2022 AFL draft, pick 8 overall.

== Junior career ==
=== Queenscliff ===
Clark played his junior football with Queenscliff, regularly filling in for matches above his age level. Clark's talent was on display from an early age, when in 2018 he booted 60 goals for the season in the Coutas' under-15 team. He was named in the best players for all but one of his 16 matches, despite playing the majority of them as a 13-year-old, and represented the Geelong Falcons in that year's V/Line Cup. The following year, Clark made his senior debut for Queenscliff in their 2019 final-round clash against Ocean Grove, just a month after turning 15. Under the coaching tutelage of his father Steve, the Coutas ran away 73-point winners and Clark kicked a goal in what would be his only Bellarine league match.

=== Geelong Falcons ===
After interrupted junior seasons in 2020 and 2021 due to the COVID-19 pandemic, Clark captained the Falcons in the 2022 NAB League Boys season and won the club's best and fairest award. Clark was also co-captain of Vic Country during the 2022 AFL National Championships, where he was named most valuable player for his state, and selected as a midfielder in the All-Australian team. Clark averaged 25 and 23 disposals per game for the Falcons and Vic Country respectively, and was often touted as a player with similar attributes to Joel Selwood.

== Senior career ==
Clark made his AFL debut in round 9 of the 2023 AFL season against Richmond as the tactical substitute. He was activated late in the third quarter and finished with four kicks, two handballs and five tackles from his 25 per cent time on ground. Clark was subsequently sidelined with a navicular stress reaction in his foot for the following months.

== Statistics ==
Updated to the end of round 22, 2026.

Legend
G	Goals	K	Kicks	D	Disposals	T	Tackles
B	Behinds	H	Handballs	M	Marks

Season	Team	No.	Games	Totals							Averages (per game)							Votes
Season	Team	No.	Games	G	B	K	H	D	M	T	G	B	K	H	D	M	T	Votes
2023	Geelong	13	1	0	0	4	2	6	0	5	0.0	0.0	4.0	2.0	6.0	0.0	5.0	0
2024	Geelong	13	15	2	1	105	78	183	26	43	0.1	0.1	7.0	5.2	12.2	1.7	2.9	0
2025	Geelong	13	10	1	2	56	35	91	15	18	0.1	0.2	5.6	3.5	9.1	1.5	1.8	0
2026	Geelong	13	9	3	3	76	71	147	40	24	0.3	0.3	8.4	7.9	16.3	4.4	2.7	0
Career			35	6	6	241	186	427	81	90	0.1	0.2	6.9	5.3	12.2	2.3	2.6	0
