= Les Jones (footballer, born 1907) =

Australian rules footballer, born 1907

Personal information
- Full name: Leslie George Everard Jones
- Born: 17 February 1907; Queenscliff, Victoria
- Died: 20 November 1982 (aged 75); Hampton, Victoria
- Original team: Queenscliff
- Height: 177 cm (5 ft 10 in)
- Weight: 77 kg (170 lb)

Playing career^{1}
Years	Club	Games (Goals)
1931	North Melbourne	2 (0)
- ^{1} Playing statistics correct to the end of 1931.

Leslie George Everard Jones (17 February 1907 – 20 November 1982) was an Australian rules footballer who played with North Melbourne in the Victorian Football League (VFL).

== Family ==
The son of George Alfred Jones (1880–1968), and Violet Ivy Eula Jones (1886–1948), née McKee, Leslie George Everard Jones was born at Queenscliff, Victoria on 17 February 1907.

== Death ==
He died at Hampton, Victoria on 20 November 1982.
