= Frank Scully (footballer) =

Australian rules footballer

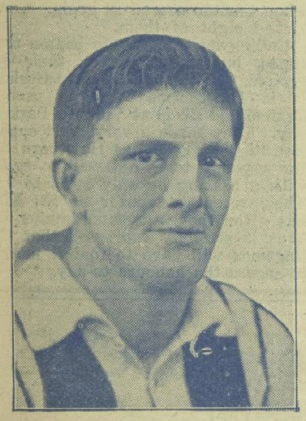

Personal information
- Full name: Francis Leo Scully
- Born: 28 October 1899; South Melbourne, Victoria
- Died: 5 May 1980 (aged 80); North Melbourne, Victoria
- Original team: Windsor
- Height: 171 cm (5 ft 7 in)

Playing career^{1}
Years	Club	Games (Goals)
1924–1927	St Kilda	41 (42)
- ^{1} Playing statistics correct to the end of 1927.

Francis Leo Scully (28 October 1899 – 5 May 1980) was an Australian rules footballer who played with St Kilda in the Victorian Football League (VFL).

== World War I ==
Scully enlisted to serve in the Australian Army in May 1918, completing training at Broadmeadows and, having embarked from Sydney on 5 November 1918, was on his way to Europe when the Armistice with Germany was signed that brought an end to fighting in Europe.

== Football ==
Scully, a recruit from Windsor, started his St Kilda career in the 1924 VFL season. Debuting in round five, Scully was a regular fixture in the team for the rest of the year and won St Kilda's "best first-year player" award for his performances in 12 games. In round 17 he was reported for striking Essendon player Charlie May, for which he was suspended for five games.

He did not return the following season until round six and kicked three goals in his first game back, against Essendon. He played every game except the final two rounds, due to a shoulder injury.

His 1926 season was interrupted by an eight-week suspension, incurred for an incident in St Kilda's round two loss to Geelong at Junction Oval. The incident happened after Scully received a free kick for having his arm pulled by Geelong's Ken Leahy. According to the field umpire's account, Scully punched the ball away following the free kick, which struck Leahy in the face. The pair then exchanged blows and had to be separated by the boundary umpire. As Leahy was the first to strike, Scully's suspension was for "retaliation". The tribunal chairman believed Leahy was the aggressor, but as Scully was also charged with striking they could not take provocation into account. Leahy was also suspended for eight weeks.

A return to football was further delayed by a court case, relating to the theft of a motor vehicle tyre from the property of St Kilda vice president John Beddison. Scully pleaded guilty to the charge and was committed for trial in August, along with four other men, two of them his brothers. On the night in question, the men had dinner at the Duke of Edinburgh Hotel in St Kilda, which was managed by Beddison. Soon after 8 pm, the men left in a taxi and Beddison noticed that the tyre was missing from his car outside the hotel. Prosecutors alleged that Scully had taken the tyre, which he dropped off at a local motor garage during the taxi ride. The judge asked the jury to take into consideration that Scully was intoxicated and the jury returned a not guilty verdict. He played in three of the final four rounds of the season.

In 1927, Scully played 14 games for St Kilda and kicked 18 goals. The following year he left to coach Penshurst.
