= Peter Stephens (footballer, born 1879) =

Australian rules footballer

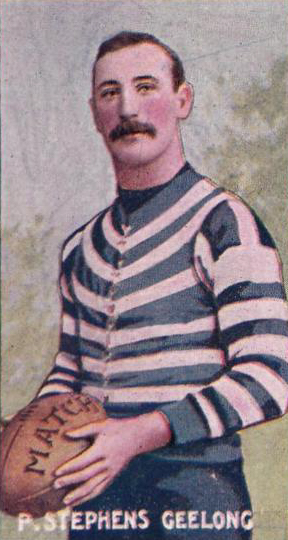
- Cigarette card of Stephens in 1906

Personal information
- Full name: Peter Stephens
- Born: 16 May 1879; Queenscliff, Victoria
- Died: 13 December 1946 (aged 67); Queenscliff, Victoria

Playing career^{1}
Years	Club	Games (Goals)
1902–1908	Geelong	102 (22)
- ^{1} Playing statistics correct to the end of 1908.

Peter Stephens (16 May 1879 – 13 December 1946) was an Australian rules footballer who played with Geelong in the Victorian Football League (VFL).

Stephens was recruited from Queenscliff and played mainly as a defender, but was also used as a ruck-rover during his seven seasons at Geelong.
