= Les Smith (Australian footballer) =

Australian rules footballer, born 1900

Personal information
- Full name: Leslie Maurice Smith
- Born: 28 May 1900; Murchison, Victoria
- Died: 12 January 1975 (aged 74); Geelong, Victoria
- Original team: Newtown
- Height: 173 cm (5 ft 8 in)
- Weight: 72 kg (159 lb)

Playing career^{1}
Years	Club	Games (Goals)
1921–1929	Geelong	123 (17)
- ^{1} Playing statistics correct to the end of 1929.

Leslie Maurice Smith (28 May 1900 – 12 January 1975) was an Australian rules footballer who played with Geelong in the Victorian Football League (VFL).

Smith, who Geelong acquired from Newtown, started out as a wingman and rover but played mostly as a defender during his league career. He was a regular in the Geelong team throughout the 1920s. In 1925 he was one of only five Geelong players to appear in all 19 games and was in the back pocket in their 1925 premiership side.
