= Denis Heagney =

Australian rules footballer

Personal information
- Full name: Denis Heagney
- Born: 13 April 1898; Smeaton, Victoria
- Died: 11 March 1942 (aged 43); Newtown, Victoria
- Original team: Creswick
- Height: 180 cm (5 ft 11 in)
- Weight: 83 kg (183 lb)

Playing career^{1}
Years	Club	Games (Goals)
1925–1926	Geelong	6 (1)
- ^{1} Playing statistics correct to the end of 1926.

Denis "Dinny" Heagney (13 April 1898 – 11 March 1942) was an Australian rules footballer who played with Geelong in the Victorian Football League (VFL).

Heagney, in just his fourth league game, was a follower in Geelong's 1925 premiership team. He played in the opening two rounds of the 1926 VFL season but didn't appear in any more games for Geelong.

He died on 11 March 1942.
