= Edward Stevenson (footballer) =

Australian rules footballer

Personal information
- Full name: Edward A. Stevenson
- Born: 11 April 1901
- Died: 19 July 1977 (aged 76)
- Original team: Chilwell
- Height: 166 cm (5 ft 5 in)
- Weight: 57 kg (126 lb)

Playing career^{1}
Years	Club	Games (Goals)
1922–1929	Geelong	105 (30)
- ^{1} Playing statistics correct to the end of 1929.

Edward "Wingy" Stevenson (11 April 1901 – 19 July 1977) was an Australian rules footballer who played with Geelong in the Victorian Football League (VFL).

The pint-sized Stevenson was a wingman, who Geelong recruited locally from Chilwell. He could also play as a forward but was on the wing when he played in the 1925 VFL Grand Final, which Geelong won to claim their first VFL premiership.
