= Ron Shapter =

Australian rules footballer and coach

Personal information
- Full name: Ronald William Shapter
- Born: 1 July 1905; Queenscliff, Victoria
- Died: 3 November 1977 (aged 72); Heidelberg, Victoria
- Original team: Queenscliff (GJFA)
- Height: 184 cm (6 ft 0 in)
- Weight: 82 kg (181 lb)
- Positions: Forward, Ruckman

Playing career^{1}
Years	Club	Games (Goals)
1930–31	South Melbourne	26 (14)
1932–34	Fitzroy	18 (13)
1936	Essendon	2 (0)
Total		46 (27)
- ^{1} Playing statistics correct to the end of 1936.

Ronald William Shapter (1 July 1905 – 3 November 1977) was an Australian rules footballer who played with South Melbourne, Fitzroy and Essendon in the Victorian Football League (VFL) during the 1930s.

A ruckman and forward from Geelong Junior Football Association (GJFA) club Queenscliff, Shapter was 24 when he made his VFL debut in the opening round of the 1930 season, with future club great Bob Pratt also playing his first game. He spent just two seasons at South Melbourne, both under coach Paddy Scanlan, but didn't miss any of the club's first 17 games while he was at the club.

After struggling to command a regular place in the team in 1931, Shapter left for Fitzroy, while South Melbourne would two years later win the premiership. He made only one appearance for Fitzroy in 1932 but cemented a spot in the lineup from round six of the 1933 VFL season only to be on the outer again in 1934.

Shapter spent 1935 as captain-coach Port Melbourne in the Victorian Football Association. The left footer returned to the VFL the following year, with Essendon, but could only add two more senior games to his tally. He then returned to his original club Queenscliff as their captain-coach.
