= Former Fire Station (Windsor, Connecticut) =

- U.S. National Register of Historic Places
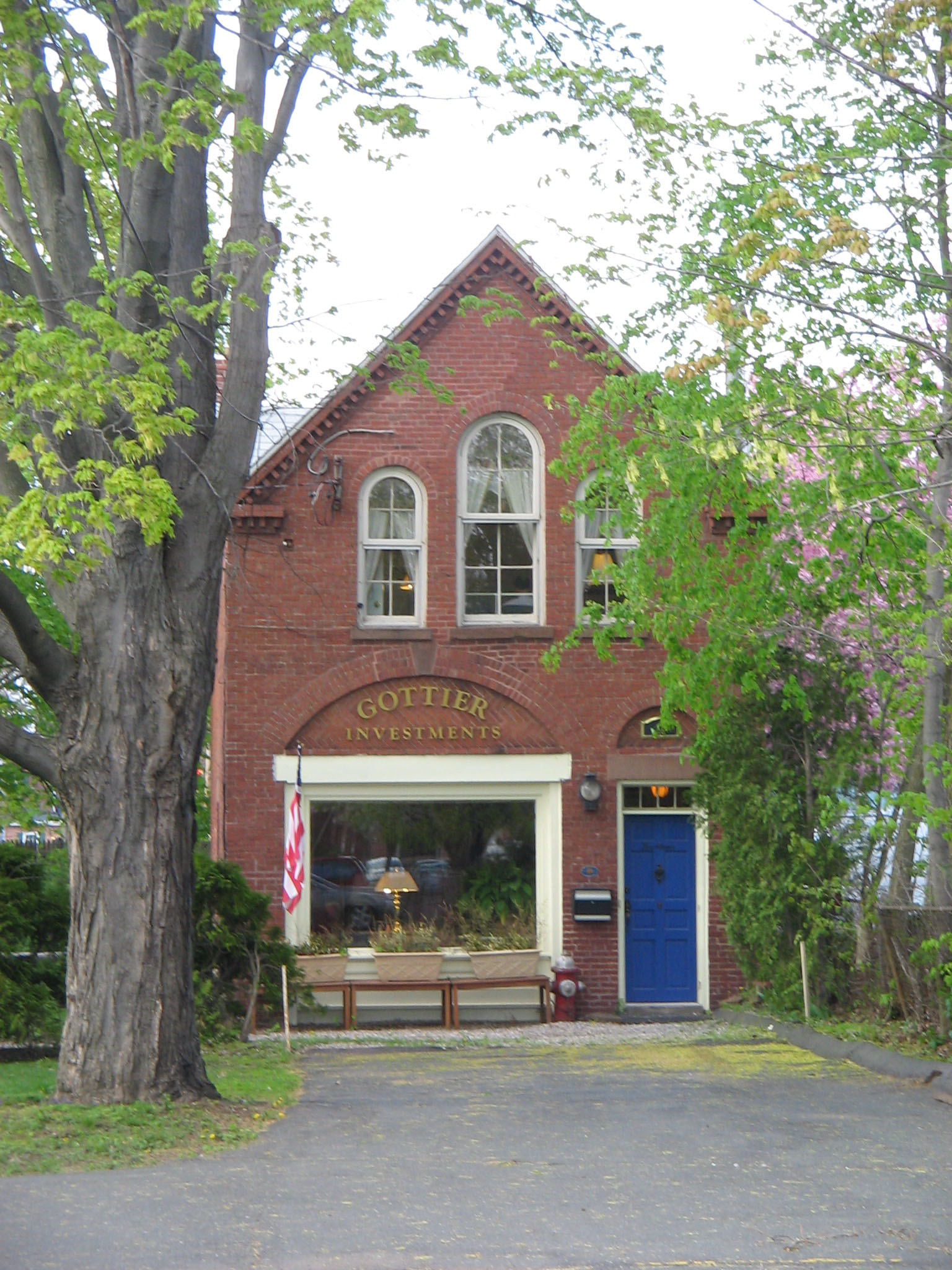
- The Former Fire Station

- Location within Connecticut Location within the United States
- Location: 14 Maple Avenue, Windsor, Connecticut
- Coordinates: 41°51′5″N 72°38′44″W
- Area: 0.1 acres (0.040 ha)
- Built: 1882
- Architectural style: Italianate
- MPS: 18th and 19th Century Brick Architecture of Windsor TR
- NRHP reference No.: 88001485
- Added to NRHP: September 15, 1988

The building at 14 Maple Avenue in Windsor, Connecticut, United States, is a Former Fire Station of the town. It was built about 1882, and was the town's first purpose-built firehouse. Now converted to commercial use, it was listed on the National Register of Historic Places in 1988.

== Description and history ==
Windsor's former fire station stands far back on the north side of Maple Avenue, with a small parking area in front and buildings facing Broad Street to its east. It is a brick structure, 2-1/2 stories in height. On its main facade, the former garage entrance for the fire truck, which was an elliptically arched opening, has been filled in with a square plate glass window and brickwork filling the arch above. The main doorway is to the right, set in a rectangular opening along with a four-light transom window; it is also topped by a blind arch. Above these, and extending into the gable, is a three-part Palladian window, each section with a round-arch top. The front gable eave is adorned with brick dentil work. The west side wall is topped by a small gabled wall dormer.

The station was built about 1882 on land donated by H. Sidney Hayden. In addition to being the town's first fire station, it is a fine local example of Victorian styling in brick. It served as a fire station until 1939, and was converted to commercial use in 1973. It is now the home of Gottier Investments.

== See also ==
- National Register of Historic Places listings in Hartford County, Connecticut
