= George Todd (Australian footballer) =

Australian rules footballer, born 1903

George 'Jocka' Todd
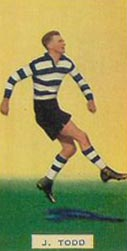

Personal information
- Full name: George Ernest Todd
- Born: 10 January 1903; Queenscliff, Victoria
- Died: 13 August 1986 (aged 83); Queenscliff, Victoria
- Original team: Queenscliff
- Height: 185 cm (6 ft 1 in)
- Weight: 79 kg (174 lb)

Playing career^{1}
| Years | Club | Games (Goals) |
| 1922–1934 | Geelong | 232 (54) |
- ^{1} Playing statistics correct to the end of 1934.

Career highlights
- Geelong best and fairest 1927, 1930, 1931; Geelong premierships 1925, 1931; Geelong Team of the Century; Victorian representative (12 games, 0 goals)

George Ernest "Jocka" Todd (10 January 1903 – 13 August 1986) was an Australian rules footballer in the (then) Victorian Football League (VFL).

== Football ==
A tight checking full-back who spoiled well, Todd played his whole career with Geelong Football Club.

George was recruited from Queenscliff Football Club and played mainly at centre half-forward before transferring to the back line where he played the majority of his games as full back. He possessed outstanding skills and at times was unbeatable. He had the ability to punch the ball away from his opponents no matter how high they were in the air, and played in an era of some of the great full-forwards. His judgement was superb. A master of the drop kick he frequently landed the ball in the centre of the ground. Noted for his fair play, he was never ruffled under pressure.

He was playing coach of Terang in the 1938 Hampden Football League season.

== Australian Football Hall of Fame ==
In 1996, Todd was inducted into the Australian Football Hall of Fame.

== See also ==
- 1927 Melbourne Carnival
