= David Ferguson Hunter =

Scottish Victoria Cross recipient (1891-1965)

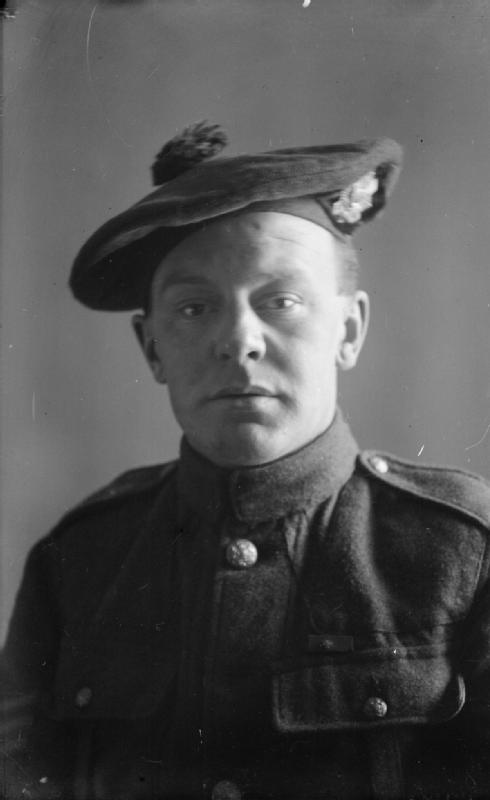
- Born: 28 November 1891; Dunfermline, Fife, Scotland
- Died: 14 February 1965 (aged 73); Dunfermline, Fife, Scotland
- Burial place: Dunfermline Cemetery
- Military career
- Allegiance: United Kingdom
- Branch: British Army
- Rank: Sergeant
- Service number: 43247
- Units: The Highland Light Infantry
- Conflicts: World War I
- Awards: Victoria Cross; Imperial Service Medal

David Ferguson Hunter VC (28 November 1891 – 14 February 1965) was a Scottish recipient of the Victoria Cross, the highest and most prestigious award for gallantry in the face of the enemy that can be awarded to British and Commonwealth forces.

Hunter was 26 years old, and a corporal in the 1/5th Battalion, The Highland Light Infantry, British Army during the First World War when the following deed took place for which he was awarded the VC on 23 October 1918.

On 16/17 September 1918 at Moeuvres, France, Corporal Hunter was detailed to take on an advanced post which was established in shell holes close to the enemy. There was no opportunity for reconnoitring adjacent ground, and the following afternoon Corporal Hunter found that the enemy had established posts all round him, isolating his command. He determined to hold out and despite being exceedingly short of food and water this NCO managed to maintain his position for over 48 hours until a counter-attack relieved him. He repelled frequent enemy attacks and also barrage from our attacks, which came right across his post.

He was subsequently promoted to the rank of sergeant on 23 October 1918. He died 14 February 1965

On 12 August 2004, his previously unmarked grave in Dunfermline Cemetery was marked by a memorial stone in a ceremony.

== Freemasonry ==
He was initiated into Freemasonry in Lodge Union, No. 250, (Dunfermline, Scotland) on 3 January, Passed on 6 February and Raised 3 May 1919.

== The Medal ==
His Victoria Cross is displayed at the Museum of The Royal Highland Fusiliers, Glasgow, Scotland.
