= Queenscliffe Historical Museum =

Museum in Victoria, Australia

Coordinates: 38°16′04″S 144°39′41″E

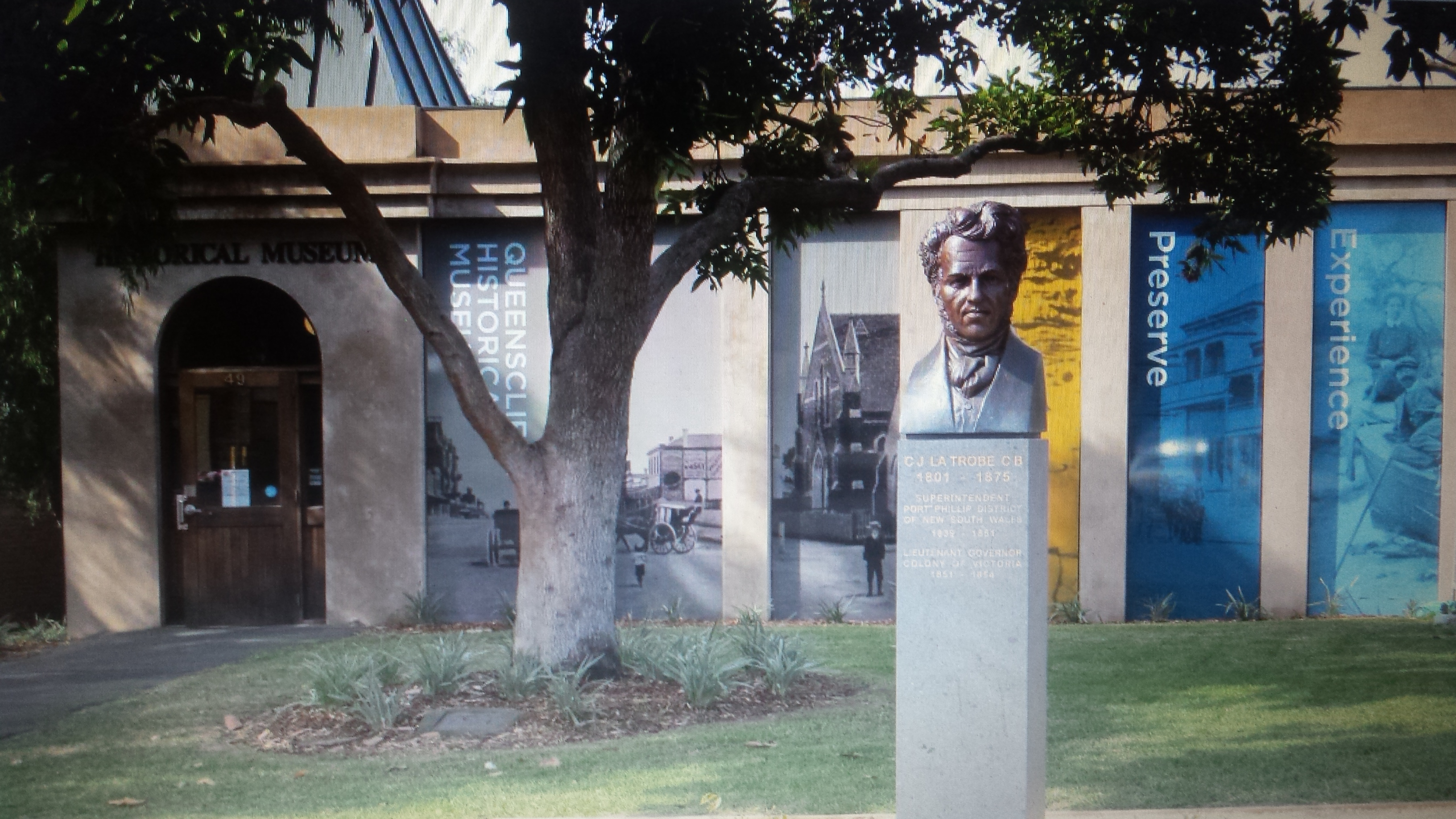
Queenscliffe Historical Museum Entrance, including La Trobe bust

The Queenscliffe Historical Museum is a regional cultural history museum in the town of Queenscliff, Victoria, Australia. The museum is part of the Museum Accreditation Program (MAP).

== Description ==
The original museum opened in 1974, specifically to house socially historical materials peculiar to the Borough of Queenscliffe (which includes Queenscliff, Point Lonsdale and Swan Island). The museum is home to many thousands of items including photographs, documents, paintings, newspapers, toys, and also a display of shipwreck relics recognised by Heritage Victoria.

A new museum was built into the Queenscliffe Community Hub and opened in 2022. The Queenscliff Library and the Visitor Information Centre are also located in the Hub.

The museum is managed by volunteers. There are about 370 members, including 130 volunteers (as at 2024).

== Main permanent exhibits ==
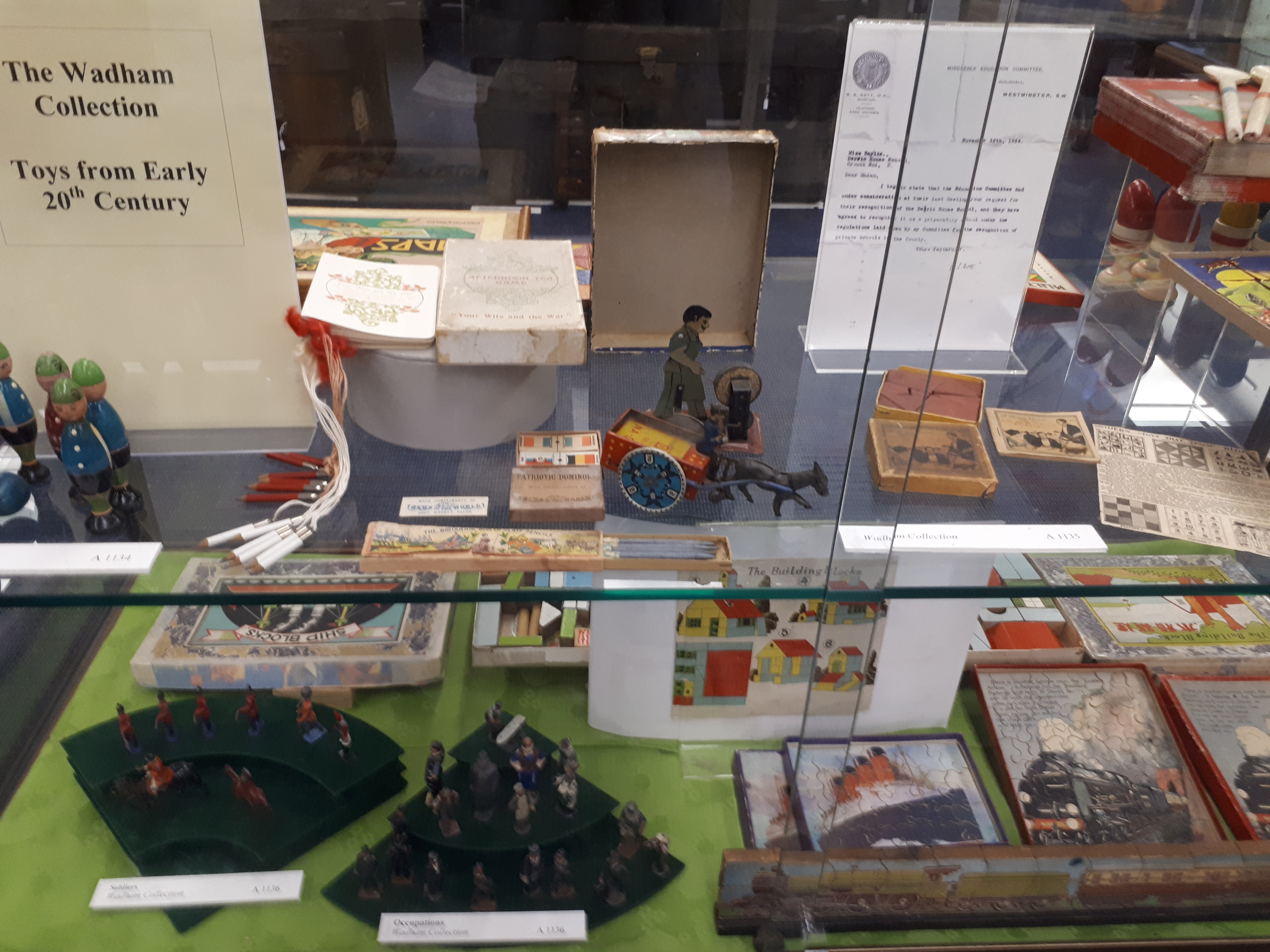
One of the many displays at the Queenscliffe Historical Museum

The main permanent exhibits include

- Origins & Environment: Queenscliff, Point Lonsdale and Swan Island/Swan Bay are part of Wadawurrong Country. The Borough of Queenscliffe was created in 1963 and comprises 11 square kilometres. It is the site of important military, maritime, railway, resort and architectural history, as well as being home to the sensitive Swan Bay wetlands ecosystem that provides habitat, refuge and feeding grounds for many wildlife and bird species.
- Creating Community: From the early 1800s, community development in the Borough of Queenscliffe was diverse and rapid. It included the early days of the Baillieu family, the achievements of pioneering women and the building of churches and hotels.
- The Queen of Watering Places: From the late 1800s, people flocked to the Borough of Queenscliffe in their thousands, seeking the 'curative powers' of the seaside within easy distance of Melbourne or Geelong. Over the years, holidays changed in style but Queenscliffe has always remained a popular destination for rest, recuperation, relaxation and entertainment.

== Events ==
Monthly Talks are held on the fourth Friday of every month at the Point Lonsdale Community Hall, Bowen Rd, Point Lonsdale . Topics range from significant people, places and events in the Borough of Queenscliffe and are presented by local historians.

== Research ==
The museum's archive can be accessed by the public. The database houses thousands of documents, photographs and records of people, buildings and events.

== Publications ==
- Celebrating History... Items from the Queenscliffe Historical Museum Collection

The museum's 50th anniversary book was launched on 15 October 2017 by the Honorable Ted Ballieu
