= Dave Ferguson (footballer, born 1903) =

Australian rules footballer

Personal information
- Full name: David James Ferguson
- Born: 5 February 1903; Coolgardie, Western Australia
- Died: 16 November 1975 (aged 72); Geelong, Victoria
- Original team: Kalgoorlie City (GFA)
- Height: 177 cm (5 ft 10 in)
- Weight: 86 kg (190 lb)

Playing career^{1}
| Years | Club | Games (Goals) |
| 1924–1928 | Geelong | 39 (5) |
| 1931 | North Melbourne | 7 (0) |
| Total | | 46 (5) |
- ^{1} Playing statistics correct to the end of 1931.

David James Ferguson (5 February 1903 – 16 November 1975) was an Australian rules footballer who played with Geelong and North Melbourne in the Victorian Football League (VFL).

Ferguson came from the Western Australian town of Kurrawang and played his early football for Kalgoorlie City in the Goldfields Football Association. As a centre half-forward, he was good enough to be selected to represent the league in exhibition games.

When he joined Geelong in 1924 he began playing as a backman. He was one of the Geelong defenders which kept Gordon Coventry goal-less in the 1925 VFL Grand Final, which they won by 10 points. After missing the semi-final, Ferguson had returned to the side at the expense of young Frank Mockridge. In the final moments of the grand final, he beat three Collingwood forwards to take a crucial defensive mark, despite having fallen onto his back. He returned to the Goldfields in 1926 but resumed his VFL career in 1927, firstly at Geelong, then at North Melbourne for the 1931 season.
