= Jim Warren (footballer) =

Australian rules footballer, born 1903

Personal information
- Full name: James William Warren
- Nickname: Dugger
- Born: 22 July 1903; Queenscliff
- Died: 8 April 1977 (aged 73); Queenscliff (ashes scattered at sea, plaque on wife's grave)
- Original team: Queenscliff
- Height: 164 cm (5 ft 5 in)
- Weight: 74 kg (163 lb)
- Position: Rover
- Other occupation: Fisherman

Playing career^{1}
Years	Club	Games (Goals)
1923	Queenscliff	(unknown)
1924	Port Fairy	unknown
1925–1928	Geelong	57 (58)
1929-1930	Sorrento	31 (unknown)
1930	Queenscliff	1 (a semi final match)
- ^{1} Playing statistics correct to the end of 1940.

Career highlights
- 1923 Association representative team at Goldfields; 1924 coached Port Fairy; VFL premiership player: 1925; Geelong leading goalkicker: 1925; 1929-30 coached Sorrento (1929 premiership)

James William Warren (22 July 1903 – 8 April 1977) was an Australian rules footballer who played with Geelong in the Victorian Football League (VFL). He was born in Queenscliff.

Warren was Geelong's third leading goal-kicker in 1925 with 24 goals and was a rover in their premiership team that year. He spent three more seasons at Geelong.

== Sorrento career ==
Warren joined Sorrento on the Victorian Mornington Peninsula in the Peninsula Football Association as playing coach in 1929–1930. His 1929 team finished the season with a premiership after a drawn grand final replay.
