= Ken Leahy =

Australian rules footballer, born 1906

Personal information
- Full name: Kenneth Augustine Leahy
- Born: 22 September 1906; Kalgoorlie, Western Australia
- Died: 27 January 1985 (aged 78); Greensborough, Victoria
- Original team: West Perth
- Height: 174 cm (5 ft 9 in)
- Weight: 71 kg (157 lb)

Playing career^{1}
Years	Club	Games (Goals)
1925–1927	Geelong	29 (4)
- ^{1} Playing statistics correct to the end of 1927.

Kenneth Augustine Leahy (22 September 1906 — 27 January 1985) was an Australian rules footballer who played with Geelong in the Victorian Football League (VFL).

Leahy, a Western Australian, started his career with West Perth but was at Goldfields club Kalgoorlie Railways when cleared to Geelong in 1925. He was on a half back flank in Geelong's 1925 premiership team.
