= George Beasley =

Australian rules footballer

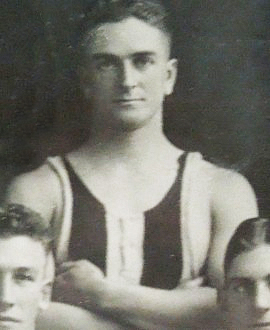
- Beasley during his Collingwood career

Personal information
- Full name: George Edward Beasley
- Born: 26 April 1902; Ondit, Victoria
- Died: 6 August 1962 (aged 60); Parkville, Victoria
- Original team: Birregurra / Prahran
- Height: 175 cm (5 ft 9 in)
- Weight: 73 kg (161 lb)

Playing career^{1}
Years	Club	Games (Goals)
1924–1928	Collingwood	38 (17)
- ^{1} Playing statistics correct to the end of 1928.

George Edward Beasley (26 April 1902 – 6 August 1962) was an Australian rules footballer who played with Collingwood in the Victorian Football League (VFL).

Beasley came from Birregurra and played for Prahran before joining Collingwood.

He played in two losing grand finals for Collingwood, as a back pocket defender in 1925 and at full-back in 1926.

Beasley was playing coach of Williamstown 1929. He played 17 games and kicked 11 goals for 'Town in a season where the team won 9 games, lost 12 and finished in eighth position. He was replaced as captain-coach for 1930 by Jack O'Brien and Beasley crossed to Oakleigh.
