= Queenscliffe Maritime Museum =

Coordinates: 38°15′53″S 144°40′02″E

- Established: 1986
- Location: 2 Wharf Street, Queenscliff, Victoria, Australia
- Type: Historical museum
- Website: https://www.maritimequeenscliffe.org.au/

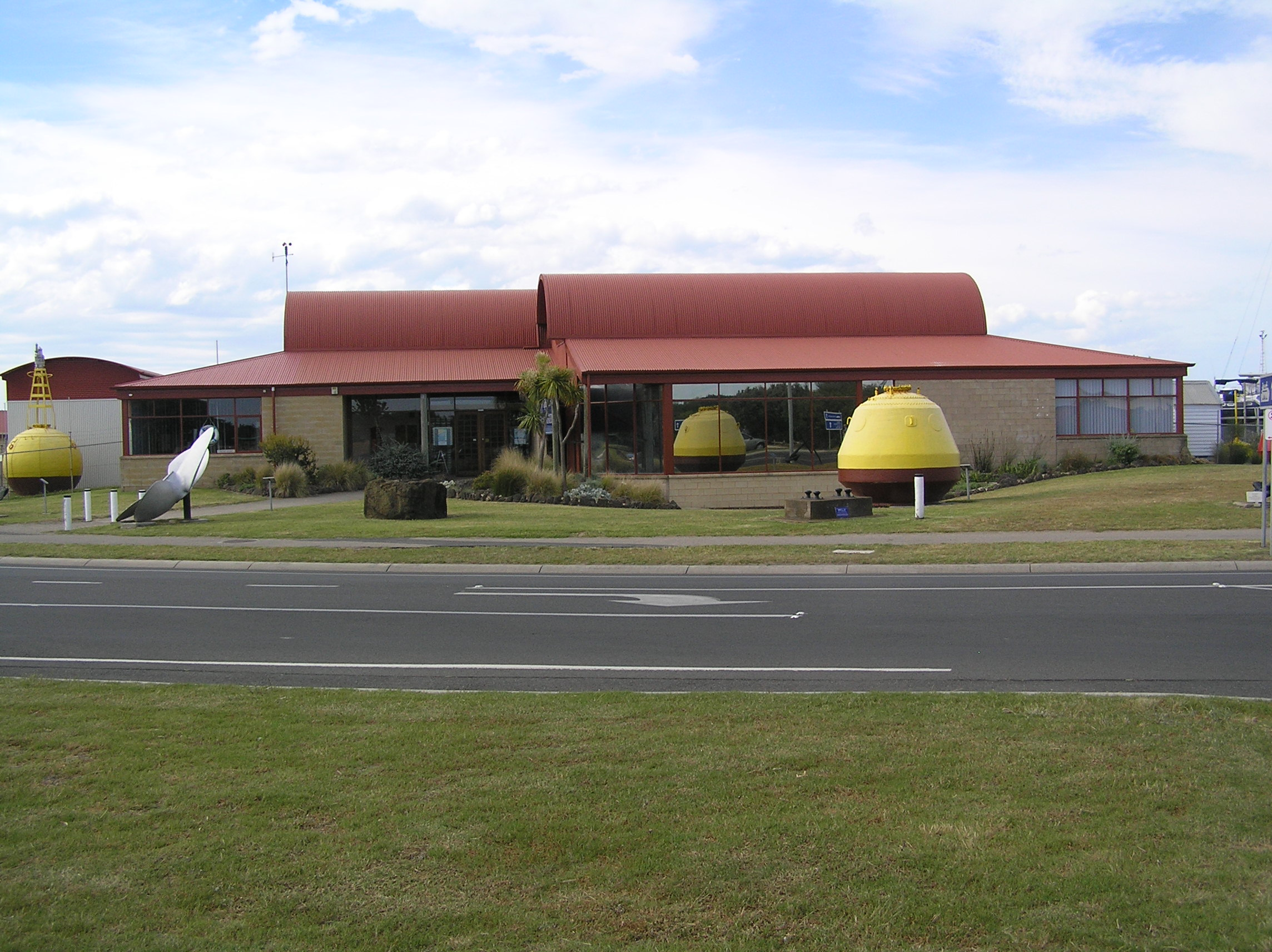
View of the museum from the south

The Queenscliffe Maritime Museum is a regional maritime museum in the town of Queenscliff at the entrance from Bass Strait to the bay of Port Phillip in Victoria, south-eastern Australia. It lies within walking distance of the Searoad ferry terminal. It covers the maritime history of the Borough of Queenscliffe, southern Port Phillip and the connection with Bass Strait.

== Description ==
The museum was established in 1986 in a new building erected to preserve and display the town's last lifeboat. It contains historical displays, maritime artefacts and a hydrographic model of the nearby Rip, the shipping channel between the promontories of Point Lonsdale and Point Nepean. Its grounds hold a fishermen's waiting shed with ship paintings by Henry Zanoni, the deck house from the iron sailing ship Shandon, and the buried hull of the Victorian torpedo boat HMVS Lonsdale. The museum also organises tours of the Point Lonsdale Lighthouse.
