= Former Fire Station (Walhalla, Victoria) =

Historic fire station in Australia

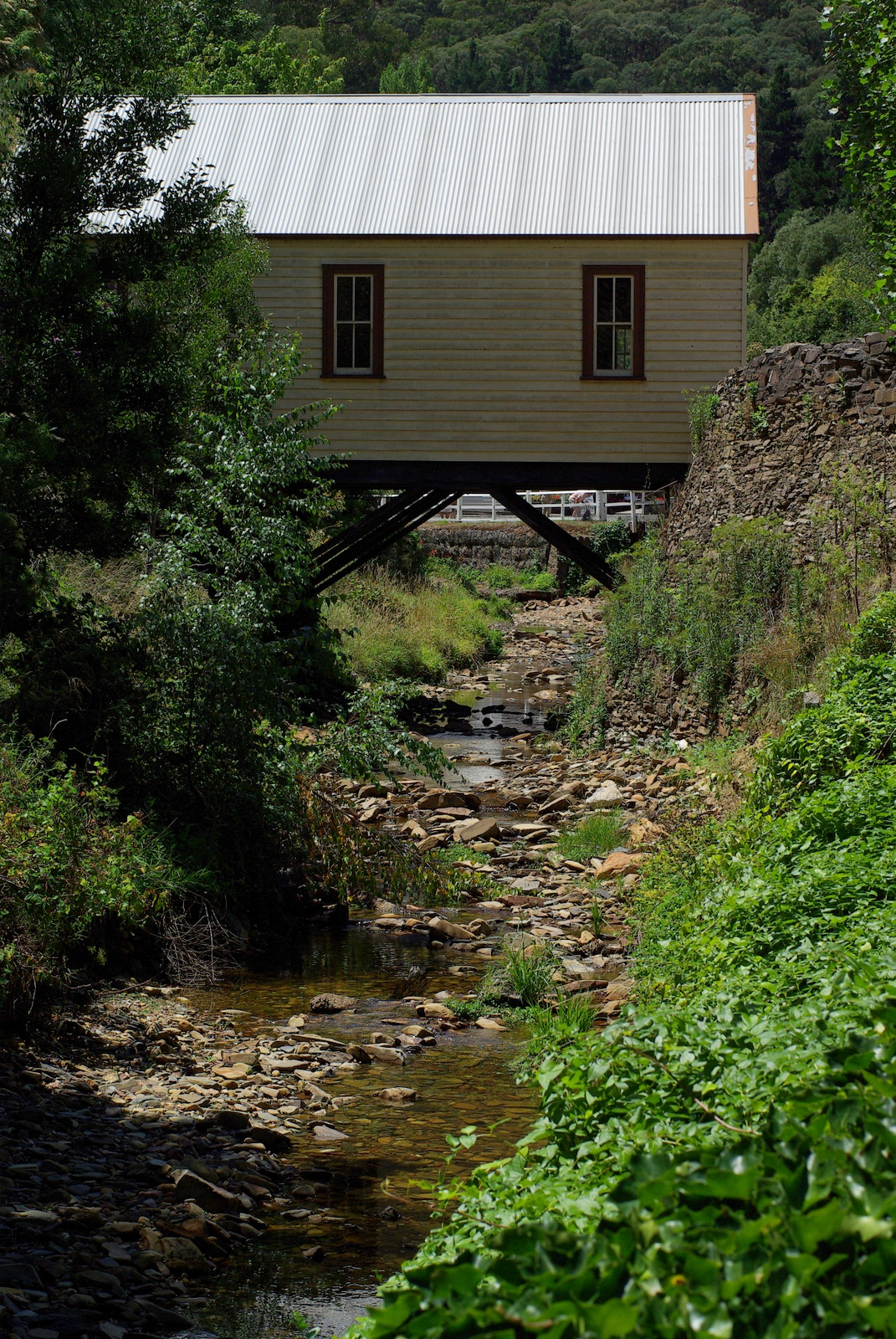
- Restored fire station

- Location within Australia
- 37.941600°S 146.451216°E
- Location: Walhalla, Baw Baw Shire, Victoria

History
- Built: 1901

Victorian Heritage Register
- Designated: 28 November 1974
- Reference no.: VHR 67418

The Former Fire Station in Walhalla, Baw Baw Shire, Victoria spans over Stringer's Creek. It is listed on the Victorian Heritage Register.

It is now the "Old Walhalla Fire Station Museum", part of a Walhalla Museum which includes another building.

The fire station was built in 1901. The Walhalla Fire Brigade was deregistered in 1961. The building is now a museum and holds the restored 1903 Merryweather Fire Cart.

According to a website, "The fire station museum houses a collection of firefighting equipment and photographic displays on the fires that have hit Walhalla including information on how the fires started."

== See also ==
- List of fire stations
