= Borough of Queenscliffe =

Coordinates: 38°16′00″S 144°39′00″E

- Local government area

- Interactive map of Borough of Queenscliffe
- Country: Australia
- State: Victoria
- Region: Barwon South West
- Established: 1863
- Council seat: Queenscliff

Government
  - Mayor: Cr Di Rule
  - State electorate: Bellarine
  - Federal division: Corangamite

Area
  - Total: 10.83 km^{2} (4.18 sq mi)

Population
  - Total: 2,982 (2018)
  - Density: 275.35/km^{2} (713.1/sq mi)
- Gazetted: 12 May 1863
- Website: Borough of Queenscliffe
LGAs around Borough of Queenscliffe
Greater Geelong	Greater Geelong	Port Phillip Bay
Greater Geelong	Borough of Queenscliffe	Port Phillip Bay
Bass Strait	Bass Strait	The Rip

The Borough of Queenscliffe is an Australian local government area in the Barwon South West region of Victoria, located in the southern part of the state. It is the smallest local government area in Victoria, covering an area of 10.83 square kilometres (4.18 mi^{2}) and, in June 2018, had a population of 2,982. It includes only two settlements, which are Queenscliff and Point Lonsdale. It is situated on the south coast, south-east of Geelong on the Bellarine Peninsula south of Swan Bay and next to the Port Phillip Heads, the entrance to Port Phillip Bay from Bass Strait.

The borough is governed and administered by the Queenscliffe Borough Council; its seat of local government and administrative centre is located at the council headquarters in Queenscliff. The borough is named after the main settlement located in the centre of the LGA, that is Queenscliff, which is also the LGA's most populous urban centre with a population of 1,315.

== History ==
The Borough of Queenscliffe was established on 12 May 1863. Queenscliff was first and foremost built for government purposes, providing postal, customs, health and telegraph services, lighthouse and signal services, military and defence establishments and the sea pilots service.

=== Survival of the local council restructure ===
Queenscliffe is the last borough remaining in both Victoria and all of Australia and was the only LGA not to have been subject to changes to its boundaries and/or name in the Victorian local government restructure which took place between 1993 and 1995. Had the same restructuring principles, which had been applied to other municipalities in the state, also been applied to Queenscliffe, the Borough would have been absorbed into the new City of Greater Geelong.

Queenscliffe's exclusion from the restructure was debated in the Victorian Parliament at the time.

Liberal Premier Jeff Kennett, in explaining his reasons, stated:

It was my view initially that Queenscliffe should have been included. When the government had a look at the KPMG report it outlined the way Queenscliffe was administered, which was in such a way that the people of Queenscliffe would not benefit by the amalgamation. In other words, the people of Queenscliffe have been running themselves well, and small or large communities that do well ought to be recognised.

The Labor member for Melbourne, Neil Cole, suggested that his reasons were based on internal Liberal Party considerations:

...the powerful Liberal Party forces in Queenscliffe were able to argue that they are different from Geelong people. The Liberal Party power base there said, If you think you are going to take Queenscliffe away, think again. If you do it to us you will be in trouble--. So someone got on the telephone, and what happened? For no apparent reason other than Liberal political purposes there is the absolute anomaly of Queenscliffe not being included in the amalgamation.

Kennett explicitly denied that this was the case:

..the honourable member for Melbourne said, that Queenscliffe happens to be more conservative than Labor in its make-up of population. I can assure all members that that was not the reason for the decision.

Labor member George Seitz suggested a more innocent reason:

The Borough of Queenscliffe has not been included in the proposed amalgamation probably because of the number of elderly retired people in the area. The residents of Portarlington, Drysdale and St Leonards have expressed concern about their rates and the retention of the services that have been provided by the local council, such as nursing, podiatry and other services. Those people are used to the availability of face-to-face services and feel comfortable in a rural setting.

Overall, the reasons for Queenscliffe being excluded remain unclear, and the range of opinions may perhaps best be summarised by Peter Loney's quip:

...we are not sure why it was omitted. The Minister for Local Government said it was because Queenscliffe is unique. The Premier said it was because of the council's effectiveness. Some people suggest the uniqueness of Queenscliffe has a lot to do with the number of influential Liberal Party members living at Point Lonsdale who have exerted pressure.

=== Reduction in number of councillors ===
At the 2008 elections the number of councillors was reduced from seven to the current five.

== Council ==
=== Current composition ===
The council is composed of five councillors elected to represent an unsubdivided municipality. The current council was elected in November 2024 for a four-year term. Councillors are elected on a proportional representation basis.

Ward	Councillor	Notes
Unsubdivided
Unsubdivided	Donnie Grigau	
Unsubdivided	Isabelle Tolhurst	
Unsubdivided	Brendan Monahan	Deputy Mayor
Unsubdivided	Di Rule	Mayor
Unsubdivided	Hélène Cameron	

=== Mayors ===
- Pat Semmens (2006–2008)
- Bob Merriman (2008–2012; 2018–19)
- Hélène Cameron (2012–2016)
- Tony Francis (2016–2017)
- Susan Salter (2017–2018)
- Ross Ebbels (2019–2022)
- Isabelle Tolhurst (2022–2024)
- Ross Ebbels (2024)
- Di Rule (2024–present)

=== Administration and governance ===
The council meets in the council chambers at the council headquarters in the Queenscliffe Municipal Offices, which is also the location of the council's administrative activities. It also provides customer services at its administrative centre in Queenscliff.

== Election results ==
=== 2024 ===
2024 Victorian local elections: Queenscliffe
Party	Candidate	Votes	%	±%
Independent Liberal	Donnie Grigau (elected 1)	637	22.33	+9.35
Independent	Isabelle Tolhurst (elected 2)	507	17.77	+7.07
Independent	Brendan Monahan (elected 3)	476	16.68	+16.68
Independent Liberal	Di Rule (elected 4)	391	13.70	+13.70
Independent	Ross Ebbels	209	7.33	–14.42
Independent	Hélène Cameron (elected 5)	204	7.15	+7.15
Independent	Ralph Roob	118	4.14	+4.14
Independent	Rob Minty	98	3.43	–2.93
Independent	Peter Jewell	85	2.98	+2.98
Independent	David Orford	78	2.73	+2.73
Independent	Lucille Maria Colombo	50	1.75	+1.75
Total formal votes		2,853	96.91	+1.09
Informal votes		91	3.09	–1.09
Turnout		2,944	87.85	+0.74

=== 2020 ===
2020 Victorian local elections: Queenscliffe
Party	Candidate	Votes	%	±%
Independent	Ross Ebbels (elected 1)	752	21.75	
Independent Liberal	Donnie Grigau (elected 2)	449	12.98	
Independent	Michael Grout (elected 3)	434	12.55	
Independent	Isabelle Tolhurst	370	10.70	
Independent	Fleur Hewitt (elected 5)	363	10.50	
Independent Labor	Susan Salter (elected 4)	331	9.57	
Independent	Robert Minty	220	6.36	
Independent	Jacqui Pierce	209	6.04	
Independent	Geoffrey Mathews	160	4.63	
Independent	Zelda Walters	100	2.89	
Independent	Amanda Hoysted	70	2.02	
Total formal votes		3,458	95.82	
Informal votes		151	4.18	
Turnout		3,609	87.11	

== Townships and localities ==
The 2021 census, the borough had a population of 3,276 up from 2,853 in the 2016 census

Population
Locality	2016	2021
Point Lonsdale^	2,684	3,788
Queenscliff	1,315	1,516
Swan Island	0	0

^ - Territory divided with another LGA

== See also ==
- List of places on the Victorian Heritage Register in the Borough of Queenscliffe
