= Queenscliff, Victoria =

Queenscliff
- Town
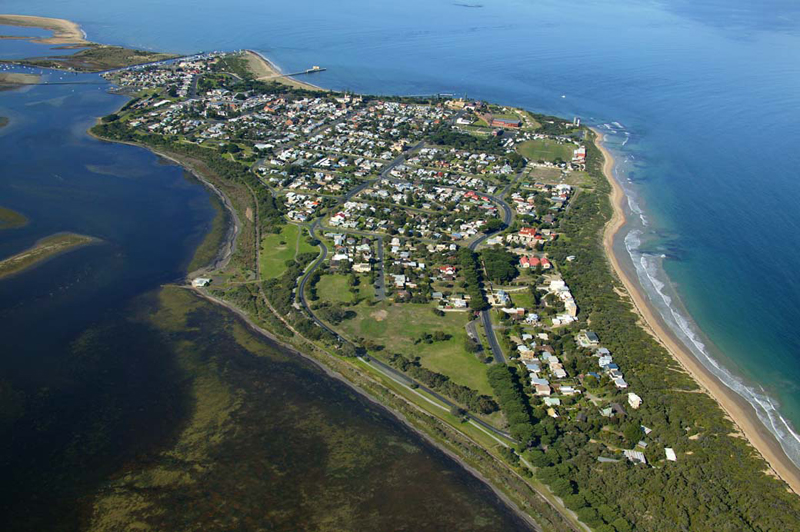
- Looking east over Queenscliff to Sand Island. On the left is Swan Bay and the right is Port Phillip Bay.

- Coordinates: 38°16′0″S 144°39′0″E
- Country: Australia
- State: Victoria
- LGA: Borough of Queenscliffe
- Location: 104 km (65 mi) S of Melbourne; 30 km (19 mi) SE of Geelong

Government
  - State electorate: Bellarine
  - Federal division: Corangamite
- Elevation: 15 m (49 ft)

Population
  - Total: 1,516 (2021 census)
- Postcode: 3225
Localities around Queenscliff
Swan Bay	Swan Bay	Swan Island
Swan Bay	Queenscliff	Port Phillip Bay
Point Lonsdale	Port Phillip Bay	Port Phillip Bay

Queenscliff is a town at the south-eastern end of the Bellarine Peninsula in southern Victoria, Australia. It lies south of Swan Bay at the entrance to Port Phillip. It is the administrative centre for the Borough of Queenscliffe. At the 2021 census, Queenscliff had a population of 1,516.

Queenscliff is a seaside resort known for its Victorian era heritage and tourist industry and as one of the endpoints of the Searoad ferry to Sorrento on the Mornington Peninsula.

== History ==
Prior to European settlement, it was inhabited by the Bengalat Bulag clan of the Wautharong tribe, members of the Kulin nation.

European explorers first arrived in 1802, Lieutenant John Murray in January and Captain Matthew Flinders in April. The first European settler in the area was convict escapee William Buckley between 1803 and 1835, who briefly lived in a cave with local Aborigines at Point Lonsdale, above which the lighthouse was later built.

Permanent European settlement began in 1836 when squatters arrived. Shortland's Bluff was named in honour of Lieutenant John Shortland, who assisted in the surveying of Port Phillip. Land sales began in 1853, the same year the name was changed to Queenscliff by Lieutenant Charles La Trobe, in honour of Queen Victoria.

The Post Office opened on 1 May 1853 as Shortland's Bluff and was renamed Queenscliff in 1854.

Originally a fishing village, Queenscliff soon became an important cargo port, servicing steamships trading in Port Philip. A shipping pilot service was established in 1841 to lead boats through the treacherous Rip, and its two lighthouses, the High and Low Lights, were constructed in 1862–63. Queenscliff also played an important military role. Fort Queenscliff was built between 1879 and 1889, and operated as the command centre for a network of forts around the port.

=== 1880s seaside resort boom ===
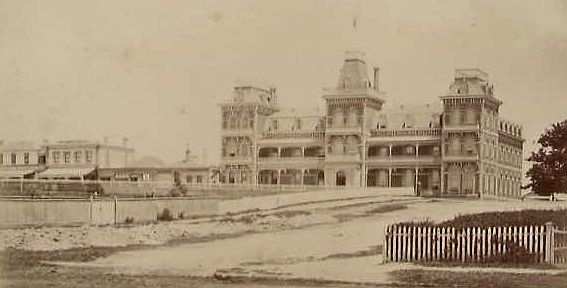
Adman's Grand Hotel in 1882

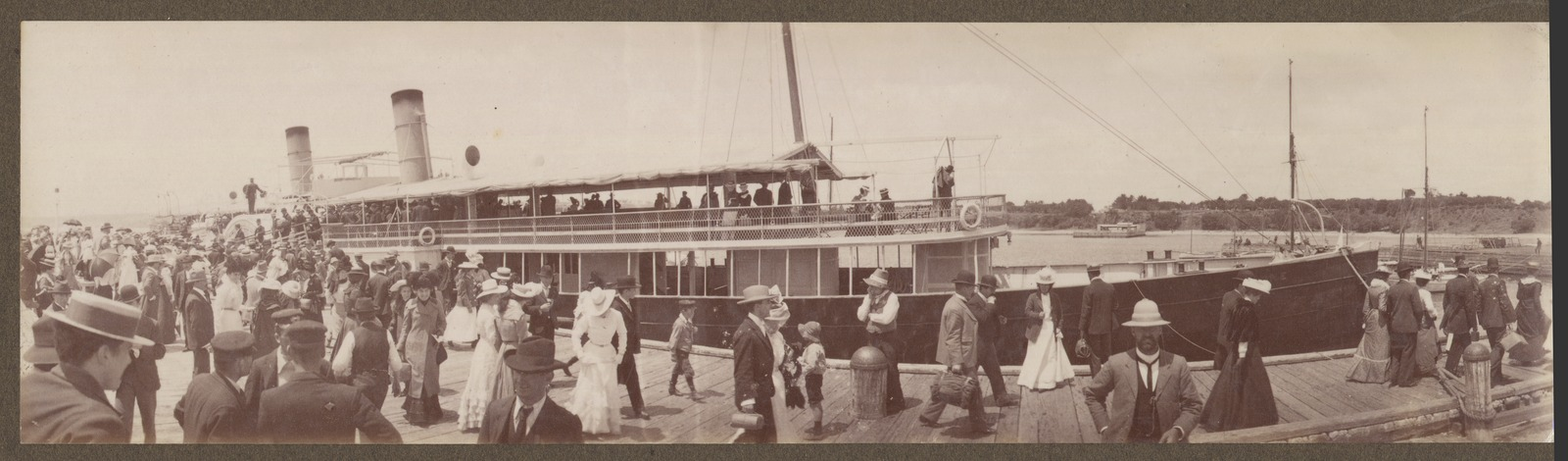
Queenscliff ferry, Ozone. State Library Victoria.

Queenscliff became a tourist destination in the late 19th century, visitors arriving from Melbourne after a two-hour journey on the paddle steamer, Ozone.

The opening of a railway line to Geelong in 1879 brought more tourists to the area, and numerous luxury hotels (or coffee palaces) were built to accommodate them. The Palace Hotel (later renamed Esplanade Hotel, now known as the Queenscliff Brewhouse) was built in 1879, the Baillieu Hotel was built in 1881 (and later renamed Ozone Hotel), the Vue Grande Hotel in 1883, and the Queenscliff Hotel in 1887.

=== Decline ===
The advent of the car saw Queenscliff drop in popularity as a tourist destination, as tourists were no longer dependent on its role as a transport hub. The railway ceased weekly passenger services in 1950, and was closed in 1976. In 1979 the Queenscliff Railway reopened as a Heritage Train Service, running between Queenscliff and Drysdale stations with mid-point stops at Laker's Siding and Suma Park.

=== Revival ===
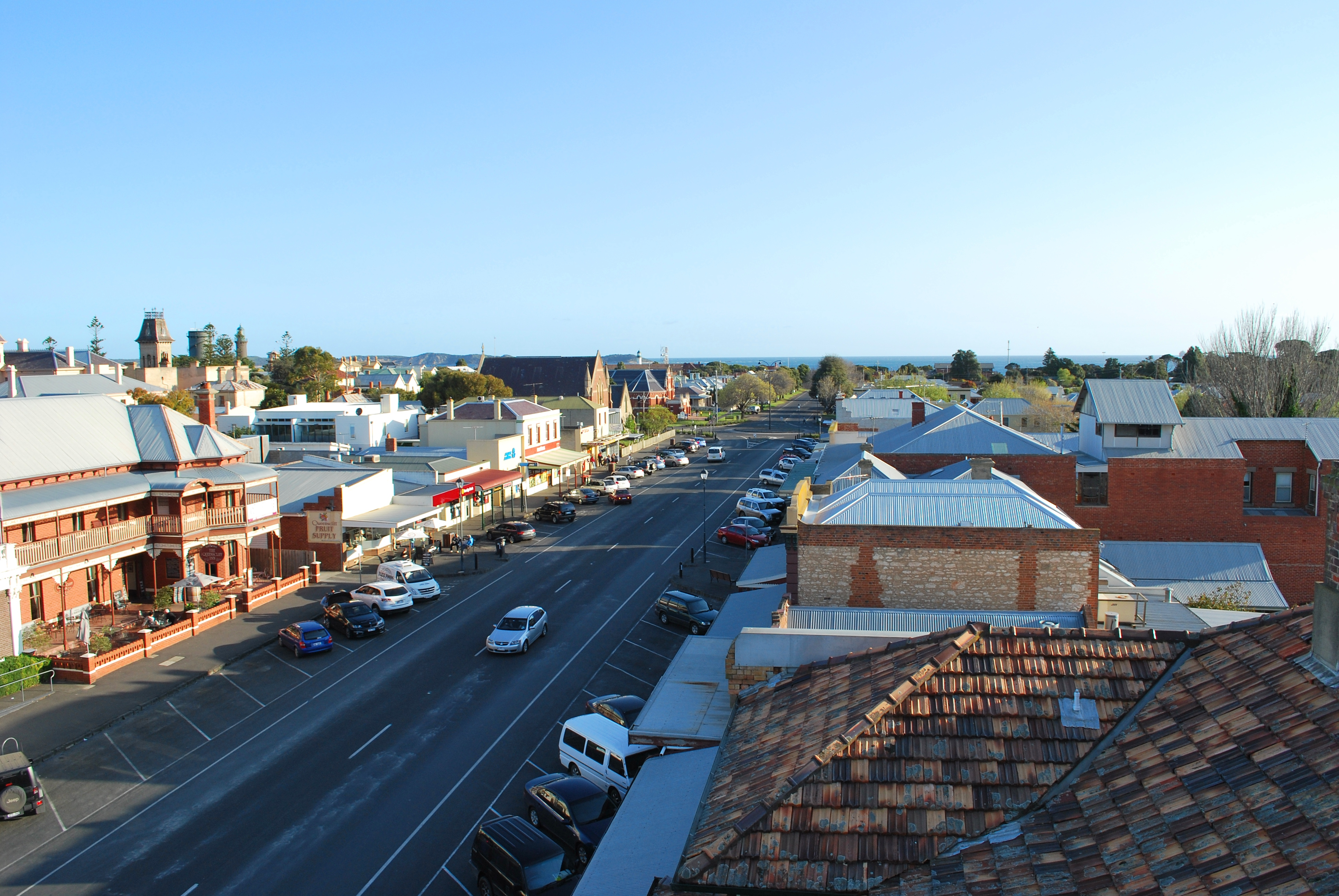
Hesse Street, the main street of Queenscliff

The 1980s saw a return in the town's tourist popularity.

In 2005, the area previously holding the Fort Barracks was subdivided into residential blocks and renamed Shortlands Beach in honour of the town's prior name. The proposed redevelopment drew fierce criticism from some sectors of the community, who feared loss of an important heritage site. The original fort remains on site.

=== Heritage listed sites ===
Queenscliff contains several Victorian Heritage Register listed sites, including:

- 1 Weeroona Parade and 2 Wharf Street, Fisherman's Shed
- 44 Gellibrand Street, Lathamstowe
- 42 Gellibrand Street, Ozone Hotel
- 60-62 Gellibrand Street, Pilots Cottages
- 16 Gellibrand Street, Queenscliff Hotel
- Symonds Street, Queenscliff Pier and Lifeboat Complex
- 20 Symonds Street, Queenscliff railway station
- 26 King Street, Rosenfeld
- 42 Mercer Street, Roseville Cottage
- 16-26 Hobson Street, St George the Martyr Church and Parish Hall
- 80 Mercer Street, Warringah
- Corner Wharf Street and Gellibrand Street, Wreck Bell
- 133-135 Hesse St, Shortlands Bluff

== Arts and culture ==
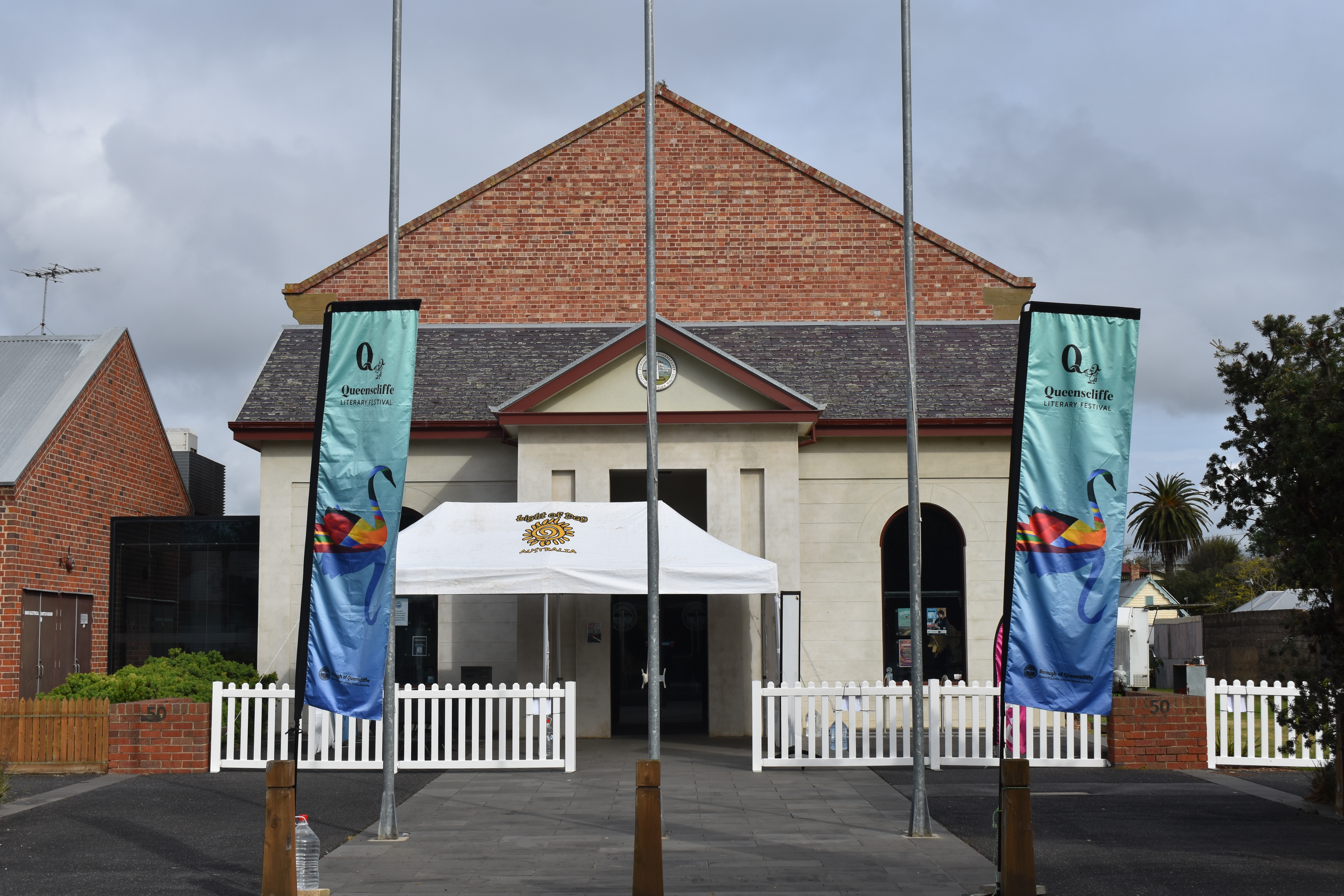
The town hall during the Queenscliffe Literary Festival

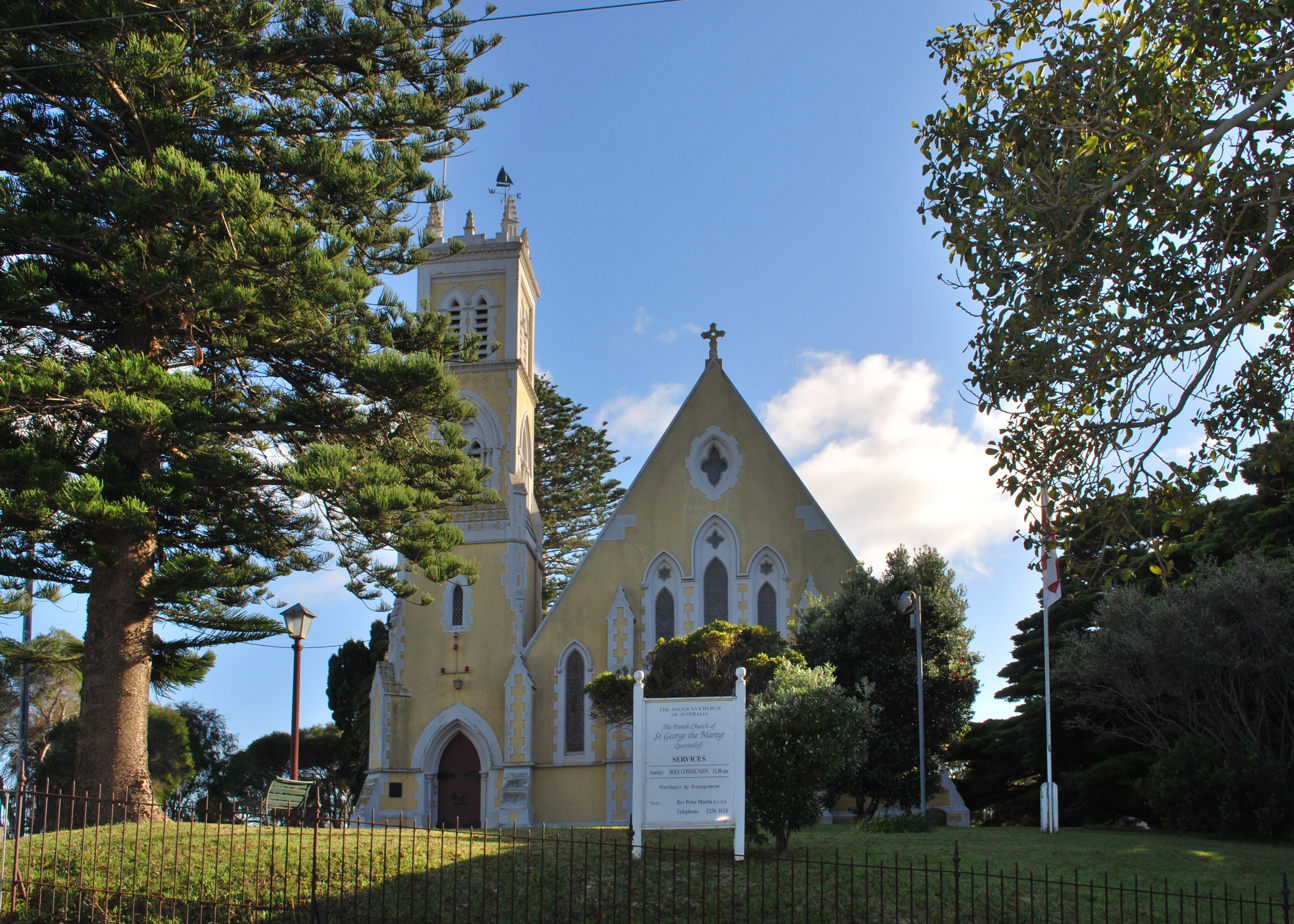
Queenscliff's parish church of Saint George

=== Festivals ===
The Queenscliff Seafood Feast, a culinary festival using fresh seafood donated by local fishermen, is held annually on Good Friday to raise funds for the Royal Children's Hospital.

Queenscliff is also home to the Queenscliff Music Festival, a popular annual music festival, held on the last weekend of November, which attracts both local and international acts and is an important part of the town's tourist industry.

The Queenscliffe Literary Festival is an annual literature festival in the town, first established in 2014. Its 2025 edition took place in Queenscliff and the neighbouring town of Point Lonsdale.

=== Museums ===
Queenscliff has three museums; the Queenscliff Historical Museum, Queenscliff Maritime Museum, and the Fort Queenscliff Museum.

=== Sport ===
The Queenscliff Football Club is the town's Australian rules football club which participates in the Bellarine Football League.

Golfers play at the Queenscliff Golf Club at Swan Island.

=== Media ===
The Queenscliff Herald was founded in 1999 by Greg Wane, who edited and managed the newspaper until 2004, when the Murphy family bought the masthead and continue to publish the newspaper.

The final elimination on the second season of The Mole took place here in late 2000.

=== Tourist attractions ===
As a popular tourist destination, Queenscliff has numerous tourist attractions including the Bellarine Railway, the Marine and Freshwater Discovery Centre and Queenscliff Harbour.

== Transport ==
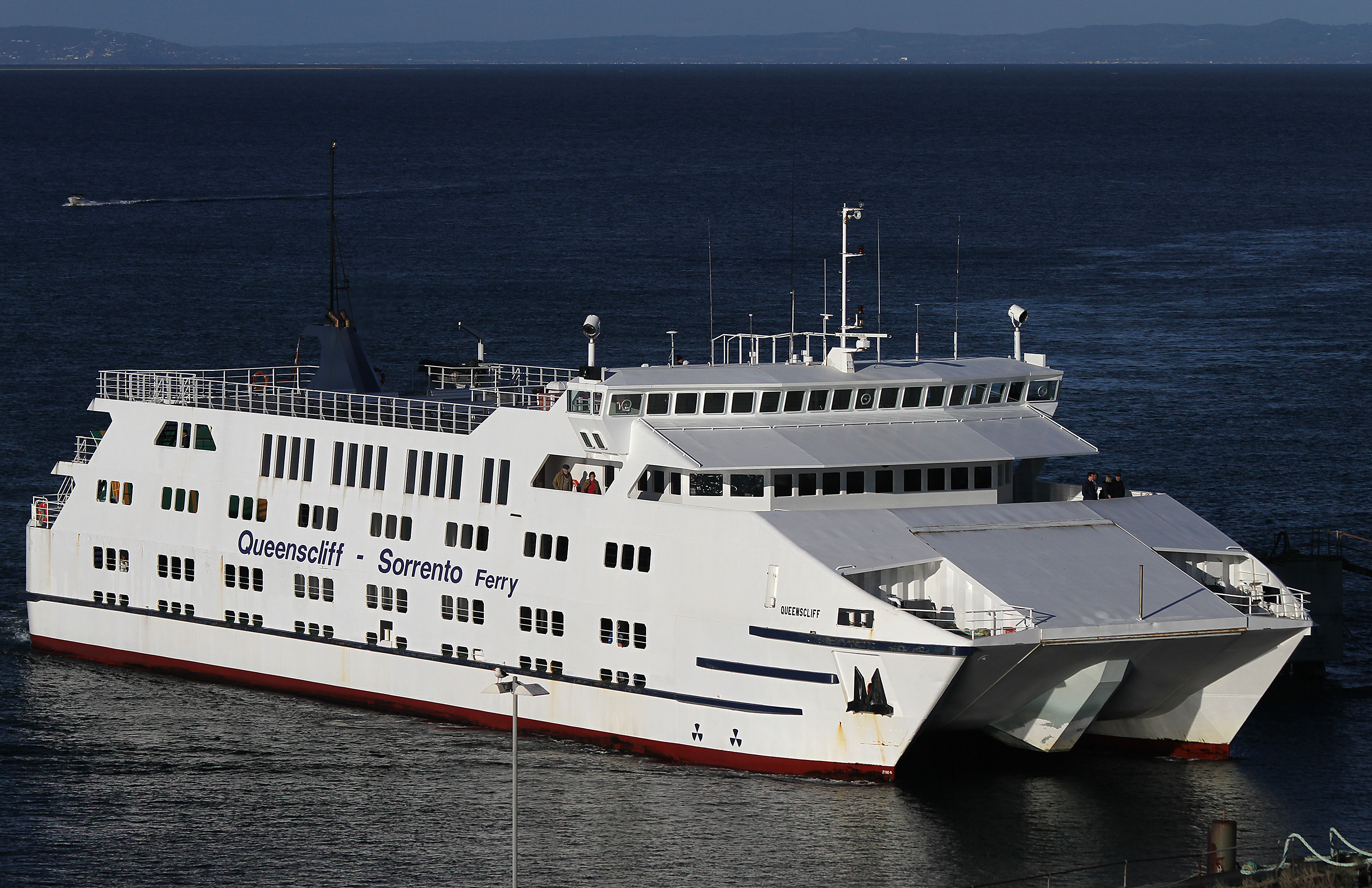
Searoad Ferry Queenscliff docking at Queenscliff

As it is located on a peninsula, the Bellarine Highway is the only road connecting it to Point Lonsdale and Geelong running west.

Searoad Ferries provides transport from Queenscliff to Sorrento on the Mornington Peninsula.

It was once connected by railway to Geelong; however, the Bellarine Railway now runs as a tourist railway only to Drysdale. The Bellarine Rail Trail is a 32 km walking and cycling track that follows the route of the former rail line.

== Climate ==
Climate data for Queenscliff, Victoria
Month	Jan	Feb	Mar	Apr	May	Jun	Jul	Aug	Sep	Oct	Nov	Dec	Year
Mean daily maximum °C (°F)	22.4 (72.3)	22.5 (72.5)	21.2 (70.2)	18.3 (64.9)	15.7 (60.3)	13.5 (56.3)	12.8 (55.0)	13.8 (56.8)	15.7 (60.3)	17.6 (63.7)	19.2 (66.6)	20.9 (69.6)	17.8 (64.0)
Mean daily minimum °C (°F)	14.1 (57.4)	14.7 (58.5)	13.6 (56.5)	11.5 (52.7)	9.4 (48.9)	7.7 (45.9)	6.7 (44.1)	7.1 (44.8)	8.4 (47.1)	9.8 (49.6)	11.3 (52.3)	12.8 (55.0)	10.6 (51.1)
Average rainfall mm (inches)	34.6 (1.36)	38.0 (1.50)	43.1 (1.70)	48.5 (1.91)	56.8 (2.24)	56.0 (2.20)	57.0 (2.24)	60.8 (2.39)	59.8 (2.35)	57.1 (2.25)	49.7 (1.96)	42.4 (1.67)	604.0 (23.78)
Average rainy days (≥ 1.0 mm)	4.7	4.3	5.9	7.8	10.1	10.6	11.2	11.6	10.4	9.5	7.5	6.0	99.6
Source: Australian Bureau of Meteorology

== Notable people ==
- Thomas Howard Fellows (1822–78), rower and politician (Judge of the Supreme Court of Victoria)
- Darcy Gardiner (born 1995), footballer (Brisbane Lions)
- Les Jones (1907–82), footballer (North Melbourne)
- Ron Shapter (1905–77), footballer (South Melbourne, Fitzroy & Essendon)
- Harry Smith (1893–1960), footballer (Fitzroy & Geelong)
- Peter Stephens (1879–1946), footballer (Geelong)
- George Todd (1903–86), footballer (Geelong)
- Jim Warren (1903–77), footballer (Geelong)

== See also ==
- Port Phillip Bay Bridge proposals
