= 1972 VFL grand final =

Grand final of the 1972 Victorian Football League season

1972 VFL Grand Final

Carlton	Richmond
28.9 (177)	22.18 (150)
	1	2	3	4
CARL	8.4 (52)	18.6 (114)	25.9 (159)	28.9 (177)
RICH	5.4 (34)	10.9 (69)	15.15 (105)	22.18 (150)
- Date: 7 October 1972
- Stadium: Melbourne Cricket Ground, Melbourne, Australia
- Attendance: 112,393
- Favourite: Richmond

Accolades
- Jock McHale Medallist: John Nicholls

Broadcast in Australia
- Network: Seven Network
- Commentators: Michael Williamson, Bob Skilton, Ron Barassi

The 1972 VFL Grand Final was an Australian rules football game contested between the Richmond Football Club and Carlton Football Club at the Melbourne Cricket Ground on 7 October 1972. It was the 75th annual Grand Final of the Victorian Football League, staged to determine the premiers for the 1972 VFL season. The match, attended by 112,393 spectators, was won by Carlton by a margin of 27 points, marking that club's 11th premiership victory.

== Background ==
At the conclusion of the regular home-and-away season, Carlton had finished first on the ladder with 18 wins, 3 losses and a draw. Richmond had finished second with 18 wins and 4 losses.

In the finals series leading up to the Grand Final, Richmond defeated Collingwood by 44 points in the Qualifying Final before meeting Carlton in the Second Semi Final. This game resulted in a draw, with both teams scoring 8.13 (61). In the Second Semi Final Replay, Richmond won comfortably by 41 points, sending them straight through to the Grand Final. Carlton then beat St Kilda by 16 points to match up with Richmond once again in the premiership decider.

Richmond went into the Grand Final as the clear favourites. Even though Carlton finished on top of the ladder, they had lost twice to Richmond during the regular season, and then were thrashed in the Second Semi Final replay. The statistics lent further weight to Richmond's favouritism; Carlton had not beaten the Tigers in a final since 1920.

As Richmond coach Tom Hafey recalled: "We were expected to kill [Carlton] in the grand final."

== Teams ==
Carlton	Richmond

Carlton
B:	19 John O'Connell	20 Geoff Southby	43 David McKay
HB:	30 Vin Waite	11 Bruce Doull	33 Paul Hurst
C:	34 Ian Robertson (dvc)	12 Barry Armstrong	27 David Dickson
HF:	22 Neil Chandler	42 Robert Walls (vc)	5 Syd Jackson
F:	2 John Nicholls (c)	25 Alex Jesaulenko	8 Trevor Keogh
Foll:	28 Peter Jones	3 Kevin Hall	10 Adrian Gallagher
Res:	7 Andrew Lukas	6 Garry Crane	
Coach:	John Nicholls		

Richmond
B:	10 Kevin Sheedy	8 Dick Clay	19 Ray Boyanich
HB:	7 Wayne Walsh	5 Rex Hunt	43 Steve Hywood
C:	30 Francis Bourke (dvc)	6 Paul Sproule	24 Graeme Bond
HF:	17 Barry Richardson	4 Royce Hart (c)	14 Marty McMillan
F:	21 Neil Balme	31 Ricky McLean	1 Daryl Cumming
Foll:	9 Craig McKellar	38 Kevin Morris	29 Kevin Bartlett (vc)
Res:	15 Brian Roberts	2 Ian Stewart	
Coach:	Tom Hafey		

== Match summary ==
The 1972 Grand Final was played under dull skies but on a superb MCG surface. Carlton made eight positional changes to its team, the most notable was that of captain-coach John Nicholls, who put himself in the forward pocket, and gave first ruck responsibilities to Peter "Percy" Jones.

Less than two minutes into the game, Trevor Keogh opened the scoring for Carlton before goals to Barry Richardson and Neil Balme put Richmond in front. But then Carlton kicked the next four goals – two of them to Nicholls – and would never again relinquish the lead. At quarter time, Carlton led by 18 points, having kicked 8.4 (52), a record first-quarter score for a Grand Final, to 5.4 (34). Some thirteen goals had been scored, and it wouldn't end there.

As well as Carlton had played in the first quarter, they were even better in the second. Although Kevin Morris opened the scoring within 30 seconds to cut the margin to 12 points, the Blues responded by kicking four goals in four minutes. By the 23-minute mark of the quarter, the Blues had kicked eight goals to reach 100 points. At the main break, Carlton led by 45 points, 18.6 (114) to 10.9 (69). Richmond had still managed to score five goals for the quarter, but Carlton were unstoppable, kicking a record ten goals for the quarter. The only worry was on the injury front; David McKay had had his jaw broken in two places by Balme, and Vin Waite had been stretchered off with a broken ankle.

And when Syd Jackson kicked truly at the 30-minute mark of the third quarter, the Blues had broken the record for the highest score in a Grand Final with still over a quarter to play. At the last change, Carlton held a 54-point lead, 25.9 (159) to 15.15 (105).

Exactly 50 goals were kicked in the game, with the teams compiling a combined score of 50.27 (327). This was, at the time, the highest scoring game in VFL history, Grand Final or otherwise, and has been bettered only seven times since. Carlton's score of 28.9 (177) remains the highest in Grand Final history, and Richmond's 22.18 (150) remains the highest losing score in a Grand Final. Richmond's score was the tenth highest score of the season: only in 1924, 1937, 1940, 1954, 1962, 1976 and 2001 have other teams lost matches with scores among the ten highest of a season.

Carlton vice-captain Robert Walls was unanimously rated best on ground, kicking six goals and directly assisting in seven others. Ruckman Peter "Percy" Jones played arguably his finest game for Carlton, while Alex Jesaulenko kicked seven goals and John Nicholls bagged six. Richmond had eleven individual goal-kickers, with Neil Balme kicking five.

Carlton's opening term score of 8.4 (52) and second term score of 10.2 (62) set the records for the best first and second quarter scores in Grand Final history (Hawthorn would later equal the first quarter score in the 1989 VFL Grand Final).

== Epilogue ==
The 1972 premiership victory was John Nicholls' finest moment, cementing his place in football history as one of the great strategists. After being mocked by opponents and berated by critics following Carlton's thrashing in the Second Semi Final, Nicholls knew that the only way to beat Richmond was to outscore them. In another tactical move, Nicholls decided not to implement the planned game changes in the Preliminary final against St Kilda, thus keeping Richmond in the dark about his intentions. Instead, he trusted his players to beat the Saints playing their orthodox game, and also credited his senior players for understanding and executing the plan. On the day Nicholls launched the plan by loading the forward line with his best players and instructing the team to play a fast, direct game that would not allow Richmond to settle. Nicholls was also aware that in the 25 games that both Richmond and Carlton had played in 1972 leading up to the Grand Final, Richmond had conceded nearly 500 more points than Carlton.

The unsuspecting Tigers fielded the same six defenders that had held Carlton to nine goals in the Second Semi Final replay two weeks earlier. Nicholls put himself in the forward pocket against Ray Boyanich and made him pay for loose play by kicking six goals, three of them in the first quarter. Afterwards Nicholls said it was the easiest physical game he had played in.

Full-back Dick Clay described the loss as "surreal", Francis Bourke as "almost eerie".

If this was Nicholls' finest moment, it was also the worst day of Richmond coach Tom Hafey's career.

Several days after the match, chief football writer for The Age Percy Beames wrote that losing the Semi Final replay was the best thing that could have happened to Carlton. He reasoned that:

[Carlton] would have gone into the Grand Final under-conditioned, and would not have learned the lessons that brought the Tigers undone [... In addition,] Carlton would have been lulled into the belief that its best chance of winning the premiership rested in retaining its players in the same positions they occupied throughout the season. Until then, the Blues had argued that it was because of this that they had finished on top of the ladder. No one believed this after the Richmond thrashing – least of all Nicholls.

This was the first of two consecutive Grand Finals to be contested between these teams. In the 1973 VFL Grand Final the fortunes were reversed, with Richmond running out winners by a margin of 30 points.

== Match Scorecard ==
Carlton vs Richmond
Team	Q1	Q2	Q3	Final
Carlton	8.4 (52)	18.6 (114)	25.9 (159)	28.9 (177)
Richmond	5.4 (34)	10.9 (69)	15.15 (105)	22.18 (150)
Venue:		Melbourne Cricket Ground		
Date:		7 October 1972 – 14:50 AEST		
Attendance:		112,393		
Umpires:		Deller		
Goal scorers:	Carlton	7: Jesaulenko; 6: Walls, Nicholls; 3: Keogh; 2: Jackson; 1: Hall, Gallagher, Chandler, Dickson		
Goal scorers:	Richmond	5: Balme; 3: Sheedy, Richardson; 2: Cumming, Hart, McMillan; 1: Stewart, Hunt, Sproule, McLean, Morris		
Best:	Carlton	Walls (best on ground), Jesaulenko, Jones, Nicholls, Keogh, Armstrong, Doull, Southby, Dickson		
Best:	Richmond	Sproule, Bartlett, Bourke, Morris, Balme		
Reports:		Balme (Richmond) reported by goal umpire Rossiter for striking McKay (Carlton) in last quarter		
Injuries:		Carl: Waite (twisted ankle and fractured jaw), McKay (fractured jaw); Rich: McLean (strained hamstring), McKellar (bruised hip)		
Coin toss winner:				
Australian television broadcaster:		Seven Network		
National Anthem:				

== Bibliography ==
- The Official statistical history of the AFL 2004
- Atkinson, Graeme; Atkinson, Brant (2009). The Complete Book of AFL Finals. Scoresby, Victoria: Five Mile Press. ISBN 978-1-74211-275-6.
- Cartledge, Elliot (2011). The Hafey Years: Reliving a Golden Era at Tigerland. Melbourne: Weston Media & Communications. ISBN 978-0-646-55712-0.

== See also ==
- 1972 VFL season
