= 1973 VFL grand final =

Grand final of the 1973 Victorian Football League season

1973 VFL Grand Final

Carlton	Richmond
12.14 (86)	16.20 (116)
	1	2	3	4
CARL	2.2 (14)	7.6 (48)	9.9 (63)	12.14 (86)
RICH	3.5 (23)	11.8 (74)	15.11 (101)	16.20 (116)
- Date: 29 September 1973
- Stadium: Melbourne Cricket Ground, Melbourne, Australia
- Favourite: Carlton

Broadcast in Australia
- Network: Seven Network
- Commentators: Mike Williamson; Bob Skilton

The 1973 VFL Grand Final was an Australian rules football game contested between Carlton and Richmond at the Melbourne Cricket Ground on 29 September 1973. It was the 76th annual Grand Final of the Victorian Football League (VFL), staged to determine the premiers for the 1973 VFL season. Although Carlton were the favourites to win, it was Richmond who would take the flag by 30 points, marking that club's eighth VFL/AFL premiership victory.

== Background ==
This was the second consecutive year in which the two teams met in the premiership decider, with Carlton having won the 1972 VFL Grand Final by 27 points in a memorable high-scoring affair. The Tigers, who were clear favourites to win that game, were desperate to atone for that humiliating result.

At the conclusion of the regular home-and-away season, Richmond had finished second on the ladder behind Collingwood with 17 wins and 5 losses. Carlton had finished third with 15 wins and 7 losses.

In the finals series, Richmond lost to Carlton by 20 points in the Qualifying Final before defeating St Kilda by 40 points in the First Semi-Final. They then defeated Collingwood by seven points in the Preliminary Final (a game in which they came back from a 45-point deficit) to advance to the Grand Final. Carlton, after their win in the Qualifying Final, defeated Collingwood by 20 points in the Second Semi-Final to advance to the Grand Final.

Both sides had injury and illness concerns before the game. Richmond champion Francis Bourke and captain Royce Hart were not supposed to be playing on strict medical grounds, but such was their determination to play that they were selected anyway. For Carlton, Barry Armstrong and Trevor Keogh were ruled out, while Alex Jesaulenko and Neil Chandler were not fully fit. Carlton were forced to name Vin Catoggio in the Grand Final side for his first full VFL game.

For field umpire Ian Robinson, this was the first of a record nine Grand Finals which he would officiate.

== Teams ==
Carlton	Richmond

Carlton
B:	26 Ray Byrne	20 Geoff Southby	30 Vin Waite
HB:	3 Kevin Hall	11 Bruce Doull	15 Phillip Pinnell
C:	27 David Dickson	19 John O'Connell	6 Garry Crane
HF:	43 David McKay	42 Robert Walls (vc)	25 Alex Jesaulenko (dvc)
F:	2 John Nicholls (c)	23 Craig Davis	4 Vin Catoggio
Foll:	28 Peter Jones	17 Brent Crosswell	18 Brian Walsh
Res:	22 Neil Chandler	32 Bryan Quirk	
Coach:	John Nicholls		

Richmond
B:	11 Laurie Fowler	8 Dick Clay	5 Rex Hunt
HB:	40 Mervyn Keane	12 Robert McGhie	30 Francis Bourke (dvc)
C:	16 Bryan Wood	2 Ian Stewart	7 Wayne Walsh
HF:	10 Kevin Sheedy	4 Royce Hart (c)	13 Stephen Rae
F:	37 Michael Green	21 Neil Balme	27 Noel Carter
Foll:	15 Brian Roberts	6 Paul Sproule	29 Kevin Bartlett (vc)
Res:	9 Craig McKellar	38 Kevin Morris	
Coach:	Tom Hafey		

== Match summary ==
The weather on the day was very warm (reaching approximately 24 degrees) and a blustery north-west wind made playing conditions less than ideal. The attendance figure of 116,956 spectators was the fourth-largest crowd in VFL/AFL history.

=== First quarter ===
The first key incident in the match occurred at the 4-minute mark of the quarter. Carlton captain-coach Nicholls, who had masterminded Richmond's demise in the previous year's Grand Final, had again stationed himself in the forward pocket and was coming out to mark a long kick from Jesaulenko when Richmond defender Fowler, who was running back with the flight of the ball, crashed into Nicholls with a high shirtfront. Fans and players were stunned at the sight of one of football's most imposing figures laying groggy on the ground and struggling to get up. Teammate David McKay reflected thus on the incident:

To see someone who was a colossus knocked out like that really stung. He was such an enormous presence on the ground as a leader that we thought, "Shit, what's going to happen now?" [...] You could talk to any player from that day and they'd tell you we were stunned. I'm not saying that was the reason Richmond won on the day, but we were starting to think twice about what the hell was happening out there.

The impact of that incident still resonates decades later, and has been replayed on television many times since. As Fowler recalled of that incident a few years later:

I was keyed up at the time and all I remember is that I had my eyes on the ball. If Nick had run through me the whole thing would have been forgotten.

Nicholls was helped to his feet by the trainers, and managed to take the free kick set shot awarded by umpire Robinson. He kicked the first goal of the match, but it was clear that the bump had shaken him, and required ongoing attention from the trainers for several minutes.

The incident set the tone for much of the quarter, as players from both sides went hard at the ball and the man. Tempers at times threatened to boil over, with several fiery clashes breaking out across the field, one notable exchange between Walsh and Crosswell captured on camera. With both forward lines struggling, it was Sheedy, who had been named on the half-forward flank, whose three goals for the quarter helped the Tigers capitalize on their work in the ruck and around the packs. Two minutes into time-on, Pinnell marked a pressured kick out of defence from Keane and was awarded a 15-metre penalty for interference after the mark. His long kick to the half-forward line was eventually gathered by McKay, whose quick snap out of a pack sailed through to bring the margin back to six points. The Tigers added further behinds in the remaining time to go into the first change with a nine-point lead.

=== Second quarter ===
Richmond's other ruckman Michael Green—whose form leading up to the Grand Final had fans worried—opened the scoring in the second quarter when he scored a goal from a free kick at centre half-forward. Carlton hit back with goals to David McKay and Kevin Hall before big Richmond forward Neil Balme left his mark on the game. First he king-hit Carlton full-back Geoff Southby, and then moments later got a punch on Vin Waite. Southby was concussed by the blow and would not return to the field after half time. Carlton were still in the match until the time-on period of the second quarter, when Richmond took control – through goals to Bartlett, captain Royce Hart, Balme, Roberts and Ian Stewart – to lead at the main break by 26 points.

=== Third quarter ===
With Southby deemed unfit to continue, Carlton brought on Chandler and made some position changes, including Jesaulenko to centre, Hall to full back and Crosswell to full forward. Hart kicked his third major to open the scoring for the second half, as Richmond began to slowly increase their lead. Stewart was moved to the half-forward line after injuring a leg, and kicked two goals for the quarter. Carlton was forced to make changes and brought on their second reserve, Bryan Quirk. Shortly afterward, Phillip Pinnell, who had been doing well in defence, suddenly broke down with severe cramp, and hobbled to the forward pocket, further adding to Carlton's woes. Richmond's defense, led by Francis Bourke and Dick Clay, managed to restrict the Blues to just two goals for the quarter – one each to Chandler and Walls. At the last change, Richmond held a commanding 38-point lead.

=== Fourth quarter ===
Carlton refused to concede defeat. After making some positional changes, the Blues kicked the first three goals of the quarter – two to Garry Crane and one to Walls. By the 15-minute mark they had managed to cut the margin to 18 points, and if Nicholls had not missed a shot from the goal-square, the game would have been up for grabs. Richmond steadied after Tom Hafey replaced Noel Carter with Kevin Morris, and when Balme kicked truly before being substituted for Craig McKellar, the contest was effectively over.

=== Aftermath ===
Kevin Bartlett was Richmond's best player, gathering 27 touches (all kicks, not surprisingly) and a goal. Kevin Sheedy's three goals in the first quarter were pivotal in helping the Tigers get a solid start, and he continued to be constructive throughout the match, ending up with 16 kicks and 7 handpasses. Michael Green shrugged off concerns over his lead-up form to assist Brian Roberts in subduing Carlton ruckman "Percy" Jones, and starred all around the ground, taking 8 marks and kicking a goal. And captain Royce Hart, despite a suspect left knee, was at his imperious best, kicking three goals and taking a series of strong marks.

Crane was rated as Carlton's best, and experienced finals campaigners Robert Walls and David McKay also played well. Richmond's win completed a great day for the club; earlier in the day, the Tigers had already secured the flag in the Reserves, Under 19s and Under 17s competitions. As Francis Bourke wrote for The Age after the game:

Imagine how we would have felt if we hadn't won the big one. We couldn't have looked [our other teams] in the eye – it's not often a club gets the chance to set such a record. How do we feel now? Bloody terrific, that's how. I never realised how sweet revenge could be, especially when it is for such a humiliating defeat as ours 12 months ago. Twelve months is a long time to live with the memory of last year's Grand Final disaster. But now we have something much better to live with. Four flags and the reputation of the strongest and most successful club in League history, that's what.

Richmond would go on to win successive premierships for the second time in the club's history, defeating North Melbourne in the 1974 VFL Grand Final and cementing Tom Hafey's reputation as one of the all-time great VFL/AFL coaches. Carlton's next appearance in a premiership decider came six years later, when it won the 1979 VFL Grand Final against Collingwood.

== Scorecard ==
1973 VFL Grand Final
Saturday, 29 September 2:30pm	Carlton	def. by	Richmond	MCG (crowd: 116,956)	Report
2.2 (14); 7.6 (48); 9.9 (63); 12.14 (86)	Q1; Q2; Q3; Final	3.5 (23); 11.8 (74); 15.11 (101); 16.20 (116)	Umpires: Robinson; Television broadcast: Seven Network
Hall, Crane, Dickson, Walls, McKay 2 Nicholls, Chandler 1	Goals	3 Stewart, Hart, Sheedy; 2 Balme; 1 Walsh, Roberts, Carter, Bartlett, Green
Crane, Walls, McKay, Hall, Waite, Doull, Pinnell, Jesaulenko	Best	Bartlett, Sheedy, Green, Sproule, Clay, Hart, Fowler, Bourke, Walsh, Stewart, Hunt
Southby (concussion)	Injuries

== See also ==
- 1973 VFL season

== Bibliography ==
- Atkinson, Graeme; Atkinson, Brant (2009). The Complete Book of AFL Finals. Scoresby: The Five Mile Press. ISBN 978-1-74211-275-6.
- Cartledge, Elliot (2011). The Hafey Years: Reliving a Golden Era at Tigerland. Melbourne: Weston Media & Communications. ISBN 978-0-646-55712-0.
- Hansen, Brian (1992). Tigerland: The History of the Richmond Football Club from 1885 (2nd ed.). Burwood, Victoria: Richmond Former Players and Officials Association. ISBN 0-7316-5047 6.
