= John Nicholls (footballer) =

Australian rules footballer (born 1939)

Personal information
- Full name: John Robert Nicholls
- Nickname: Big Nick
- Born: 13 August 1939 (age 87)
- Original team: Maryborough (BFL)
- Height: 189 cm (6 ft 2 in)
- Weight: 105 kg (231 lb)
- Position: Ruckman/Forward

Playing career^{1}
Years	Club	Games (Goals)
1957–1974	Carlton	328 (307)

Representative team honours
Years	Team	Games (Goals)
	Victoria	31 (?)

International team honours
1967-1968	Australia	7

Coaching career^{3}
Years	Club	Games (W–L–D)
1972–1975	Carlton	97 (63–31–3)
1977–1978	Glenelg	50 (30–20–0)
1981	Coburg (VFA)	18 (9–9–0)
- ^{1} Playing statistics correct to the end of 1974.^{3} Coaching statistics correct as of 1981.

Career highlights
- 3× VFL Premiership player: (1968, 1970, 1972); 5× Robert Reynolds Trophy: (1959, 1963, 1965, 1966, 1967); Renamed "John Nicholls Medal" in 2004; Carlton captain: (1963, 1968–1974); Carlton Best First Year Player, 1957; All-Australian: (1966, 1969); Australian Football Hall of Fame, inaugural Legend 1996; AFL Team of the Century; Carlton Team of the Century, ruck; Simpson Medal 1968 (Best player, VIC v WA in Perth)

John Robert Nicholls (born 13 August 1939) is a former Australian rules footballer who played for the Carlton Football Club in the Victorian Football League (VFL).

Widely regarded as one of Australian football's greatest players, Nicholls was the first Carlton player to play 300 games for the club, and was declared the club's greatest player. He represented Victoria a record 31 times in interstate football, and was inducted as one of the inaugural Legends when the Australian Football Hall of Fame was established in 1996. Nicholls played most of his football as a ruckman, and although at 189 centimetres he was not especially tall, he compensated his lack of height with his intelligence and imposing physical presence, which earned him the nickname 'Big Nick'. His rivalry with fellow Australian football legend Graham Farmer raised the standard of ruck play during the 1960s.

== Carlton career ==
The Carlton Football Club recruited Nicholls from the Maryborough Football Club in 1957 after recruiting his elder brother, Don, the previous year their father ensured that both brothers would play together at one club. Don played 77 senior games as a centreman for Carlton from 1956, when he was Carlton's best first-year player, to 1961. Nicholls enjoyed an outstanding season in 1966, winning his second consecutive Robert Reynolds Trophy, and finishing second in the Brownlow Medal count, four votes behind St Kilda champion Ian Stewart.

=== Success as captain-coach ===
In his first year as captain-coach, Nicholls led the Blues to the minor premiership with 18 wins and a draw, followed by Richmond with 18 wins. 1972 was the first season in which the McIntyre "Final Five" system was used, and so because Carlton finished on top of the ladder, this meant that they had a week's break before facing Richmond in the Second Semi-final. The match was drawn, which in those days meant that a replay was required the following week, thus shifting every other match back another week. Richmond won the replay by 41 points, but in the post-match interviews Nicholls refused to panic:

Carlton has not hit a form slump. We just had a dismal day – our worst for the season. [...] There'll be no panic just because we went down by 41 points. There won't be more than one or two changes. [...] We will be sticking to the same players because it was they who put us where we finished at the end of the home-and-away games. [...] I know the players will redeem themselves next week. We just won't beat St. Kilda – we will win well. And if we team together as I know we can I know we are good enough to take the premiership.

Robert Walls, who was serving as vice-captain, recalled that the day after the semi-final defeat, the players arrived at training feeling flat, but Nicholls revealed to them the outline of his plan to win the premiership with all-out attacking football. But first, Carlton had to defeat St Kilda in the Preliminary Final. The Saints had played in the previous year's Grand Final and still boasted a strong team. Nicholls chose not to implement his plan, trusting that his players would get the job done. The Blues prevailed by 16 points and earned the right to redeem themselves against their arch-rival.
Richmond went into the Grand Final as clear favourites, but this would be the day when Nicholls established once and for all his reputation as one of the greats of the game. The element of surprise in Nicholls' plan lay in his team selection; he handed the rucking responsibilities to "Percy" Jones, whilst stationing himself in the forward pocket with the intent of kicking goals. He also deployed Barry Armstrong in the centre while Vin Waite was given the task of minding Barry Richardson. Finally, in the lead-up to the match, Nicholls had given his players three simple instructions: get to the ball first, kick long into attack and contest for 100 minutes.
The plan succeeded in the most spectacular fashion possible. In an enthralling spectacle of attacking football from both teams, Carlton piled on the goals to lead at half time with an incredible score of 18.6 (114) to 10.9 (69). The shell-shocked Tigers tried to claw their way back into the game, but every goal they scored was met with a Carlton reply. When the final siren sounded, Carlton had registered a record score of 28.9 (177) while Richmond's score of 22.18 (150), enough to win most games, remains the highest losing score in a Grand Final. While every Carlton player contributed, Nicholls himself had a field day, kicking six goals on Ray Boyanich. He said afterwards that had he not kicked six, he felt he would have failed in the position. Walls, who also kicked six goals, was nominated best on ground.

Stung by their defeat, Richmond didn't have to wait long to avenge their humiliation as the two rivals squared off again in the following season's Grand Final. On a hot and blustery day, Richmond prevailed in a match that would be remembered for two major incidents. The first occurred at the three-minute mark of the first quarter, when Nicholls was sensationally felled by Richmond back pocket Laurie Fowler while juggling a mark. Both players had their eyes on the ball and didn't see each other until it was too late. Fowler, who was airborne, hit Nicholls with his shoulder and emerged from the collision unscathed, but Nicholls went to ground and had to be helped to his feet by the club trainers. The sight of their fallen leader stunned the Carlton players; Robert Walls recalled that "[t]here was a bit of disbelief when Nicholls went down because we'd never seen the big bloke hurt like that before." Nicholls was awarded a 15-metre penalty, and goaled from the free kick, but suffered double vision from the collision, and had little further impact on the game.
The second incident came in the second quarter, when Ian Stewart kicked the ball deep into Richmond's attacking zone to a contest involving Carlton full-back Geoff Southby and Richmond forward Neil Balme. What happened next would sour Carlton's already bitter relations with Richmond for many years. Going for the ball after it spilled off a pack contest, Southby was floored by a round-arm punch from Balme. The hit broke Southby's jaw, and he would not return to the field after half time. Just moments later, Balme would lash out again, this time at Vin Waite. Reflecting on the incident many years later, Nicholls angrily labelled Balme a "cheat":

I didn't respect him as a player because I reckon he was a cheat. He used to dwell on players and with his big, strong frame, he should have been doing more courageous things. People over the years say Balmey knocked a couple out, but he basically king-hit people.

=== Controversies ===
While playing for Carlton, Nicholls served a three-month jail term at Pentridge Prison in 1960, having been found guilty of embezzling £5,558 (equivalent to A$184,976 in 2022) from the Collins Street Branch of the ES&A Bank and larceny as a servant. He was sentenced to twelve months' imprisonment (with an eligibility for parole after three months); he missed the first eleven games of the 1960 season, returning to play against Richmond on 16 July 1960.

=== Retirement ===
Nicholls retired with a Victorian elite football and Carlton club record of 328 games. Some publications list Nicholls as playing 331 games, by reason of a VFL/AFL ruling from 1969 that added three games for Carlton that Nicholls missed while playing interstate football for Victoria to his total: this ruling was rescinded by the VFL/AFL in 1996.

Nicholls' Victorian elite football games record of 328 was broken by Kevin Murray in Round 18 of 1974 — Murray retired at the end of the 1974 season with 333 VFL/AFL games — while his Carlton club record remained until it was broken by Bruce Doull in Round 1 of 1985.

==== Other matches ====
Nicholls also played 31 matches in interstate football for Victoria, 20 pre-season/night series matches (which are counted as senior by the SANFL and WAFL but not the VFL/AFL), and seven International Rules matches he played on the 1967 and 1968 World Tours. If these matches are included, Nicholls played a total of 386 senior career games.

The VFL/AFL lists Nicholls' total as 366, excluding his pre-season/night series matches.

Depending on the viewpoint taken, Nicholls' senior career games total was an elite Victorian football record until being broken by Kevin Bartlett in Round 12 of 1981 (using the VFL/AFL's total) or Round 5 of 1982 (using his overall total).

=== Coaching ===
Following his retirement, he served as non-playing coach at Carlton in 1975, but then resigned three days before the start of the 1976 VFL season, citing mental and physical exhaustion. Nicholls then went to South Australia, where he coached Glenelg from 1977 to 1978, and then returned to Melbourne to coach Coburg in the VFA in 1981.

== Life after Football ==
Nicholls has remained loyal to Carlton, even through the recent lean years.

In August 2010, at a function to celebrate the 40th anniversary of Carlton's memorable 1970 premiership, Nicholls took the opportunity to voice his displeasure at the way Carlton had been run by previous administrators since the 1995 premiership, which eventually led, among other things, to the club's first wooden spoon in 2002:

The thing that annoys me more at the moment about Carlton is our lack of respect, generally, in the footballing public. I know that, without going right through all the 50-odd years, I have seen a lot of good committees come and go. I have seen a lot of good players come and go, but there is a lack of respect and, to me, a trashing of the Carlton brand in the past 10 or 15 years.

During Carlton's 150th anniversary celebration in June 2014, at which he was named the club's greatest player, Nicholls went further, saying that the club needed to lose its arrogant image:

But I must say, if I have one regret about the image of Carlton, who I love, it is the fact that we have probably taken over from Collingwood as being the most hated side in the league. I say that because people think we were arrogant, which we were – thanks to a couple of presidents. Without mentioning any names, they were arrogant. When we won, they didn't know how to win properly. I believe that's the thing about sport – you have got to know how to win and how to lose and do both properly. We were arrogant. I think that helped create an image of the club, being an arrogant club, which I don't think we are.

== Honours and Tributes ==
Nicholls won the Robert Reynolds Trophy for Carlton's best and fairest player on five occasions: 1959, only his third season, and then in 1963, 1965, 1966 and 1967. In the eleven seasons from 1959 to 1969, Nicholls never placed outside the top three for the award. The trophy was renamed in Nicholls' honour in 2004. He was also named in Carlton's Team of the Century in the first ruck.

Besides being named as one of the twelve inaugural "Legends of the Australian Football Hall of Fame in 1996, Nicholls was also named in the AFL Team of the Century, as the resting ruckman in the back pocket, with Graham Farmer taking the first ruck position. He is depicted contesting a boundary throw-in against Farmer in Jamie Cooper's painting the Game That Made Australia, commissioned by the AFL in 2008 to celebrate the 150th anniversary of the sport.

Teammate and fellow Hall of Fame Legend Alex Jesaulenko rated Nicholls the best he had seen or played with, "because he could have two marks and four kicks and still win a game."

Former Collingwood captain Des Tuddenham said that Nicholls had the best football brain of anyone he had met.

Carlton rover Rod Ashman recounted the impact Nicholls had during his early years at the club:

Playing alongside "Big Nick" was an absolute godsend. I got him at the end of his career, but I'll never forget one day at Carlton at a boundary throw-in, right in front of the social club in the forward pocket. He looked at me and motioned towards a spot; it was clear he wanted me to get there. Sure enough, he palms it straight to me and I kick a goal. He was that good. Opposition ruckmen just couldn't get around him. I couldn't believe the size of his legs; they were enormous. He could manoeuvre around blokes like Polly Farmer, even though he stood only six feet two. that's shorter than Chris Judd. He was just a sensational player.

== Bibliography ==
- Cartledge, Elliot (2013). Footy's Glory Days: The greatest era of the greatest game. Melbourne: Hardie Grant Books. ISBN 978-174270588-0.
