= Phillip Pinnell =

Australian rules footballer and coach

Personal information
- Born: 7 January 1951 (age 75)
- Original team: Paramount
- Height: 189 cm (6 ft 2 in)
- Weight: 86 kg (190 lb)

Playing career^{1}
Years	Club	Games (Goals)
1969–1979	Carlton	173 (5)
1980–1981	Melbourne	28 (10)
1982	Springvale	9 (14)
Total		210 (29)
- ^{1} Playing statistics correct to the end of 1981.

Career highlights
- VFL premiership player: 1970

Phillip Pinnell (born 7 January 1951) is a former Australian rules footballer who played for the Carlton Football Club and Melbourne Football Club in the Victorian Football League (VFL).

Officially recorded with a playing height of 189 cm, Pinnell was a versatile footballer who spent most of his career playing either on the wing or in defence. He was described as having good pace, marking skills and big-game temperament, as evidenced by his efforts in several finals matches for Carlton.

Pinnell was a defender but started off as a winger when he debuted for Carlton in 1969. He played in that season's losing grand final against Richmond.

Pinnell continued his good form in 1970, playing 21 games during the home-and-away season. He missed selection in the Second Semi-final and the Preliminary final but was recalled to replace Bryan Quirk who had failed to recover in time from a shoulder injury sustained in the Preliminary final. Pinnell, like most of his teammates, struggled to have an impact in the first half, but after being encouraged to take the game on by coach Barassi, responded well to be part of the premiership team. In 1972, he was unable to play in the Blues' Grand Final victory after dislocating his knee cap in replay of the second semi-final against Richmond. He would recover to play in the 1973 VFL Grand Final, which Carlton lost. Before he was 22 he had played in three grand finals but despite playing for another decade he would not appear in another decider.

Pinnell was traded to Melbourne in 1979 before playing his last game of League football in 1981.

In 1982, he served as the captain-coach of the Springvale Football Club in its inaugural season in the Victorian Football Association (VFA) Second Division.

== Personal life ==
In the 1990s, Pinnell was the Head of Middle School at Wesley College, Prahran and also taught mathematics.
