= Ray Byrne =

Australian rules footballer (born 1953)

Personal information
- Born: 16 July 1953 (age 73); Bendigo, Victoria
- Original team: Golden Square (BFL)
- Debut: Round 2, 1973, Carlton vs. North Melbourne, at Princes Park
- Height: 182 cm (6 ft 0 in)
- Weight: 80 kg (176 lb)

Playing career^{1}
Years	Club	Games (Goals)
1973–1978	Carlton	81 (13)
1979–1983	Collingwood	121 (10)
1984	Geelong	17 (0)
Total		219 (23)
- ^{1} Playing statistics correct to the end of 1984.

Career highlights
- RT Rush Trophy 1980 - Collingwood R/up B&F; Most Determined Player 1980 - Collingwood; Best First Year Player 1973 - Carlton; Victorian Representative 1980

Ray Byrne (born 16 July 1953) is a former Australian rules footballer who played with Carlton, Collingwood and Geelong during his eleven-year career in the Victorian Football League (VFL).

Byrne will be remembered as one of the most unfortunate players in the history of VFL/AFL football, as he turned out for two clubs in four Grand Finals, only to be on the losing side in each one of them (Carlton 1973, Collingwood 1979, 1980, 1981). At the time of his retirement Ray had played in 22 finals which at the time was the 6th most finals games in VFL History.

== Pre VFL Career ==
At the age of 19 Byrne played in Golden Square's 1972 Bendigo Football League Premiership side, as well as representing Bendigo Football League at Inter-League level alongside future Geelong player Kevin Sheehan, before joining Carlton who recruited him out of their residential zone.

== Carlton ==
At Carlton he went on to play 81 games from 1973 until his final game against Hawthorn in Round 6, 1978. Byrne took out Carlton's "Best First Year Player" award and appeared in a Grand Final in his debut season. By 1978 a major club upheaval that included the club going through three senior coaches (Ian Stewart, Serge Silvagni, & Alex Jesaulenko), and also his good friend Robert Walls had been traded to Fitzroy, he decided he wanted out too. He wanted to join Melbourne however it was Collingwood who made a deal with Carlton, trading a "Form Four" in exchange for Byrne, that Carlton went on to use to sign Robbert Klomp.

== Collingwood ==
Ray made his Collingwood debut in Round 14, 1978.

1980 turned out to be a stand out season for Byrne who represented Victoria at state level, he also went on to finish second in Collingwood's best and fairest claiming the RT Rush Trophy, as well as winning the clubs "Most Determined Player" award.

In round 19 of the 1983 season, Collingwood met Richmond at the MCG in Richmond champion Kevin Bartlett's 400th AFL/VFL game. His opponent that afternoon was Ray Byrne. As the teams lined up for the first bounce, Byrne reached down into his sock, stood up, and presented the balding Tiger star with a toothless comb! Bartlett was amused, but not distracted.

== Geelong ==
Before 1984 season Byrne had initially retired from VFL Football and had moved to live in Geelong. However, after receiving a phone call from his former Collingwood coach Tom Hafey, who was by now coaching Geelong, he had a change of heart. Byrne asked and received a clearance to Geelong where he went on to play the final 17 games of his career.

== Post VFL Career ==
After retiring from VFL Football, Byrne coached Drysdale to the 1985 Bellarine D.F.L. premiership.

Ray represented Victoria Country and further interleague representation for the Bendigo Football League and finished his playing career in 1990 for Western Districts and recognised as the coach of the year in the QAFL.

Byrne is currently in his final season (2015) as Regional Manager of the Bendigo Pioneers, having also previously held the same position at Gippsland Power.
