= Dick Clay =

Australian rules footballer

Personal information
- Full name: Richard Harold Clay
- Born: 6 March 1945 (age 81); Ferntree Gully, Victoria
- Original team: Kyabram (GVFL)
- Debut: Round 2, 1966, Richmond vs. Footscray, at MCG
- Height: 185 cm (6 ft 1 in)
- Weight: 89 kg (196 lb)

Playing career^{1}
Years	Club	Games (Goals)
1964–1965	Kyabram	? (176)
1966–1976	Richmond	213 (80)
1976-1977	Prahran	13 (16)
Total		226 (96)
- ^{1} Playing statistics correct to the end of 1976.

Career highlights
- 4× VFL Premiership player: (1967, 1969, 1973, 1974); Victoria Representative (2 games); Richmond Team of The Century; Richmond Hall of Fame, inducted 2002

Richard Harold Clay (born 6 March 1945) is a former Australian rules footballer who played for the Richmond Football Club in the Victorian Football League (VFL).

Renowned for his versatility, aerial strength and prodigious field kicking, Clay played a key role during one of the most successful eras in Richmond's history, playing in four VFL premierships under Tom Hafey. He was recognised for his achievements with induction into the club's Hall of Fame in 2002 and being named on the wing in Richmond's Team of the Century.

== Playing career ==
Clay began playing football for Kyabram in the Goulburn Valley Football League (GVFL), from where he gained his nickname the 'Kyabram Kid'. Initially a forward flanker, he developed into a key player after growing 15 centimetres in six months.

In 1964, Clay became only the second GVFL player to kick over 100 goals in a season, eventually finishing with 116 and also winning the League's best-and-fairest award, the Morrison Medal. Clay's performances inevitably attracted attention from a number of VFL clubs, and initially he had signed a Form Four agreement with North Melbourne after former player Les Mogg saw him in action in a practice match for Kyabram at Cobram. But Richmond and Footscray had also shown interest in obtaining Clay's services.

Clay made his VFL debut with Richmond in Round 2 of the 1966 VFL season in a win against Footscray at the MCG, lining up at centre half-forward on the great Ted Whitten.

The following season, Tasmanian prodigy Royce Hart arrived in a similar blaze of publicity to what Clay had experienced. To accommodate Hart, Hafey switched Clay to the wing where he formed a revered centreline with Francis Bourke and Bill Barrot.

Clay was on the wing in the 1967 and 1969 Grand Final triumphs.

In 1970, the Tigers again suffered a premiership hangover, despite attracting significant talent to the club and being billed as 'the glamour side of the League and [...] the most skilled and professional team to take a football field.' By Round 6, Richmond had lost four of its first five games (the only win coming in the Grand Final rematch in Round 3 against eventual season premiers Carlton, in which Clay kicked five goals) to be second-last on the ladder, with only Fitzroy having a more inferior percentage. The poor start proved fatal to the Tigers' hopes of defending the VFL premiership, and although they showed glimpses of their premiership form, they could never generate any lasting momentum and eventually finished the season in seventh place with 12 wins. After Hart's season ended in Round 17 against Hawthorn when he suffered a broken wrist, Clay was moved back to centre half-forward and performed respectably, with strong performances against North Melbourne in Round 20 (in which he was credited with 11 marks) and Round 21 against Essendon at the MCG (in which he kicked his second bag of five goals for the season). In an amusing incident, Clay also ripped the jumper of opponent Daryl Gerlach in a fierce tackle early in the second quarter, resulting in Gerlach playing bare-chested for several minutes.

After Barrot's controversial departure to St Kilda, Clay was again shifted, this time to full-back, where he would star in the back-to-back victories of 1973 and 1974 and the 1972 defeat to Carlton.

After leaving Richmond midway through 1976, Clay headed to the Victorian Football Association (VFA) where he captain-coached Prahran in 1977 before returning to Richmond where he served as Director and a member of the Match Committee in 1985.

== Life after Football ==
Today he has retired, and lives on the south coast of Victoria.

== Bibliography ==
- Hansen, Brian (1992). Tigerland: The History of the Richmond Football Club from 1885 (2nd ed.). Burwood, Victoria: Richmond Former Players and Officials Association. ISBN 0-7316-5047 6.
- Piesse, K: The Complete Guide to Australian Football, Pan Macmillan Publishers, Sydney 1993
