= Laurie Fowler =

Australian rules footballer

Personal information
- Born: 29 December 1951 (age 74)
- Original team: Oakleigh Districts
- Debut: Round 8, 1971, Richmond vs. Footscray, at the MCG
- Height: 179 cm (5 ft 10 in)
- Weight: 75 kg (165 lb)

Playing career^{1}
Years	Club	Games (Goals)
1971–1974	Richmond	49 (7)
1975–1981	Melbourne	140 (18)
Total		189 (25)
- ^{1} Playing statistics correct to the end of 1981.

Career highlights
- Richmond premiership player 1973; Keith Truscott Medal 1975, 1979, 1980; Victorian state representative 1980, 1981

Laurie Fowler (born 29 December 1951) is a former Australian rules footballer who played for Richmond and Melbourne in the Victorian Football League (VFL).

After finishing runner-up in the senior best and fairest count as a 16-year-old at Oakleigh Districts, Fowler was zoned to Richmond. Working his way up from the thirds side, Fowler made his senior VFL debut in 1971 and soon became recognised as a tough and courageous defender. He will be best remembered as the player who crashed into Carlton captain-coach John Nicholls at the start of the 1973 VFL Grand Final. The collision severely impacted Nicholls and helped Richmond avenge their loss to Carlton in the previous year's Grand Final.

Richmond won the premiership again in 1974, but Fowler quit after he was omitted from the team. The Tigers considered Fowler's senior options to be limited and sold him to Melbourne, the club Fowler had supported as a child, for $15,000 (equivalent to over $100,000 in 2009). Fowler made an instant impact with the struggling Demons, winning the Keith 'Bluey' Truscott Medal for the best and fairest player at the club in his first season. Although primarily a back-pocket player, Melbourne coach Bob Skilton also used Fowler as a ruck-rover to help cover for Greg Wells' lack of defensive skills in the midfield. In 1976, Melbourne narrowly missed out on the finals after Carlton drew with Footscray in the final round of the home-and-away season. Fowler was again among Melbourne's best players, finishing runner-up to Wells in the Keith Truscott Medal count.

Skilton was replaced as coach by former premiership player Dennis Jones at the end of the 1977 VFL season, but Melbourne's fortunes did not improve and they finished last in 1978. During that season, Fowler had to be talked out of retirement after being relegated to the Reserves, and then quit for a brief time in May after being substituted against North Melbourne. Despite receiving offers from a number of top clubs at the time, Fowler returned to Melbourne just days later and reconciled. Jones was sacked at the end of the season and Carl Ditterich returned as captain-coach.

Although Melbourne did not fare much better under Ditterich, Fowler continued to stand out, winning successive Keith Truscott Medals in 1979 and 1980 and representing Victoria at interstate level in 1980 and 1981.

Fowler walked out on Melbourne after contract negotiations failed before the start of the 1982 VFL season. Instead, he spent the season in the Victorian Football Association (VFA) with Waverley. He then became captain-coach of fellow VFA club Springvale, leading them to the Second Division flag in 1983.

== Playing statistics ==
Legend
G	Goals	K	Kicks	D	Disposals	T	Tackles
B	Behinds	H	Handballs	M	Marks

Season	Team	No.	Games	Totals							Averages (per game)						
Season	Team	No.	Games	G	B	K	H	D	M	T	G	B	K	H	D	M	T
1971	Richmond	45	1	0	1	1	0	1	0	—N/a	0.0	1.0	1.0	0.0	1.0	0.0	—N/a
1972	Richmond	11	11	0	0	108	12	120	32	—N/a	0.0	0.0	9.8	1.1	10.9	2.9	—N/a
1973	Richmond	11	22	7	3	181	19	200	64	—N/a	0.3	0.1	8.2	0.9	9.1	2.9	—N/a
1974	Richmond	11	15	0	0	136	19	155	38	—N/a	0.0	0.0	9.1	1.3	10.3	2.5	—N/a
1975	Melbourne	9	22	0	2	312	28	340	89	—N/a	0.0	0.1	14.9	1.3	16.2	4.2	—N/a
1976	Melbourne	9	22	4	6	329	68	397	90	—N/a	0.2	0.3	15.0	3.1	18.0	4.1	—N/a
1977	Melbourne	9	17	12	16	273	60	333	57	—N/a	0.7	1.0	16.1	3.5	19.6	3.4	—N/a
1978	Melbourne	9	15	1	1	199	29	228	44	—N/a	0.1	0.1	13.3	1.9	15.2	2.9	—N/a
1979	Melbourne	9	21	0	0	319	87	406	100	—N/a	0.0	0.0	15.2	4.1	19.3	4.8	—N/a
1980	Melbourne	9	21	1	0	275	92	367	86	—N/a	0.0	0.0	13.1	4.4	17.5	4.1	—N/a
1981	Melbourne	9	22	0	0	255	85	340	72	—N/a	0.0	0.0	11.6	3.9	15.5	3.3	—N/a
Career			189	25	29	2388	499	2887	672	—N/a	0.1	0.2	12.7	2.6	15.4	3.6	—N/a
