= Tom Hafey =

Australian rules footballer, born 1931

Tom Hafey MBE

Personal information
- Full name: Thomas Stanley Raymond Hafey
- Nicknames: Tommy, T-Shirt Tommy
- Born: 5 August 1931; Richmond, Victoria
- Died: 12 May 2014 (aged 82)
- Original team: East Malvern
- Height: 173 cm (5 ft 8 in)
- Weight: 76 kg (168 lb)

Playing career^{1}
Years	Club	Games (Goals)
1953–1958	Richmond	67 (10)
1960-1965	Shepparton	104 (88)
Total		171 (98)

Coaching career^{3}
Years	Club	Games (W–L–D)
1960–1965	Shepparton	?(?)
1966–1976	Richmond	248(173–73–2)
1977–1982	Collingwood	138(89–47–2)
1983–1985	Geelong	66(31–35–0)
1986–1988	Sydney	70(43–27–0)
Total		522 (336–182–4)
- ^{1} Playing statistics correct to the end of 1958.^{3} Coaching statistics correct as of 1988.

Career highlights
- Coaching: GVFL Premierships: 1963, 1964, 1965; Club: 4× Jock McHale Medal: (1967, 1969, 1973, 1974); Richmond Team of the Century; Richmond Hall of Fame – immortal status; Australian Football Hall of Fame, inducted 1996; Richmond life member; AFL life member; AFLCA Coaching Legend Award: 2011; Representative: National Football Carnival championship: 1980

Thomas Stanley Raymond Hafey MBE (5 August 1931 – 12 May 2014) was an Australian rules footballer who played for the Richmond Football Club in the Victorian Football League (VFL). He then became one of the VFL's longest-serving and most successful coaches, guiding Richmond to four VFL premierships before also having stints at Collingwood, Geelong and finally Sydney.
Hafey was an inaugural inductee into the Australian Football Hall of Fame in 1996, named coach of Richmond's team of the century in 1998, and given the AFL Coaches Association "Coaching Legend Award" in 2011. He was renowned for his fitness and toughness even in his elderly years when he would still run rings around his juniors. He would do over 700 push-ups and crunches a day every day since he started playing in the VFL.

He was appointed Member of the Order of the British Empire (MBE) in the 1982 New Year Honours.

== Playing career ==
Tom Hafey was born and raised in Richmond. He began his football career with the East Malvern under-19 team before graduating to the senior side in 1950. He spent three years with the club, winning the best and fairest in 1952.

=== Richmond Football Club ===
Hafey was then invited to train at Richmond. At the time, the Tigers were in turmoil after legendary coach Jack Dyer quit. In an effort to reinvigorate the team, Richmond recruited a number of highly considered young players, including Ron Branton, Frank Dunin and Brian Davie. However, it was Hafey, an unheralded local, who played twelve of the eighteen matches his first year, scoring eight goals, including scoring a goal with his first kick in the VFL.

The following season was less productive for Hafey as he played just four games due to a bout of hepatitis. He did, however, play back pocket when the reserves captured the premiership by defeating Melbourne in the Grand Final. He was named as one of the Tigers' best performers, and was selected for the senior team for the 1955 and 1956 seasons. In these two years, he played 28 games.

After the appointment of Alan McDonald as coach, Hafey was often relegated to the bench as Ken Ward played in the back pocket. The Tigers fell to the bottom part of the ladder. Playing a backup role for a poor team, Hafey decided to retire from the VFL at the end of 1958. Over six seasons, he had played in 67 games, starting 52 of them. In 1959, Hafey played for the local Richmond Amateurs who won the premiership that year.

== Coaching career ==
After the 1959 season, Hafey left the city of Richmond, taking a job as playing coach of Shepparton in the Goulburn Valley area of northern Victoria. His tenacious attitude and devotion to fitness turned the club into a winner. Shepparton lost the Grand Final to Tongala in 1961, then won three straight from 1963 to 1965. Meanwhile, Hafey acted as a recruiting agent for the Tigers, recommending potential players from his region.

=== Richmond ===
Hafey's performance drew the attention of Tiger secretary Graeme Richmond. When coach Len Smith had a heart attack in 1965, the club appointed Jack Titus to serve as interim coach until a replacement could be found. Hafey was encouraged to apply, and the decision came down to Hafey and former club captain Ron Branton. Many expected Branton to get the job. However, Graeme Richmond saw something special in Hafey and he was appointed coach for the 1966 season.

On his return to Richmond, Hafey found the team had acquired a number of young, high quality players. He later recalled feeling some apprehension about his youth and that he would be coaching some ex-teammates. Even so, he quickly put his stamp on the club, bringing intensity and desire to reach the top. Although he acknowledged the ideas and tactical approach of Len Smith (who remained at the club as a selector and consultant), Hafey opted for what became his trademark style: kick the ball long and quickly into the forward line. He raised the bar for fitness among his players, extending pre-season training and introducing a third training night during the week. Richmond quickly became known for being the fittest team in the competition.

Richmond began 1966 strongly. A month before the finals, they hit the top of the ladder for the first time since 1951 and seemed certain to play in September. However, two losses dropped the Tigers to fifth place with thirteen wins and a draw. They became the best-performing team to miss the finals since the inception of the McIntyre finals system in 1931. Richmond dismissed a number of players, replacing them with new players such as Royce Hart and Francis Bourke.

=== Premierships ===
Richmond dominated the 1967 season, running out winners in a classic Grand Final against Geelong. In his first two years, the team lost only seven games, and Hafey had gone from an unknown coach in the bush to the toast of the football world. In hindsight, the 1967 premiership marked a turning point for the game. The Tigers were fitter than any team that had gone before and were the highest-scoring team since 1950. Australian football, after two decades of defensive-based play, was about to enter an era of high scoring, aided by rule changes, new tactics and better standards of fitness.

The Tigers started the 1968 season slowly. They rallied to win the last six games, but missed the finals. When the Tigers were again lethargic in mid-1969, accusations of under-achievement arose and rumours that Hafey was on the way out circulated. The players rallied behind Hafey and finished the season strong, taking fourth place. The team won all three finals, taking a second premiership.

After missing the finals in 1970, Hafey took the Tigers to the finals for the next five years. Basing the team's strategy around all-out attack had drawbacks. Most famously, during the 1972 finals the team conceded the highest score ever, losing to Carlton in a shock upset. Hafey later said the defeat depressed him for many months, but it later became the motivation for back-to-back premierships in 1973 and 1974. By now, the aggressive attitude of the club both on and off the field had created resentment toward the club. A number of incidents during the 1973 Grand Final – the Windy Hill brawl, the attempted recruitment of John Pitura from South Melbourne, and a poor reaction to Kevin Bartlett's failure to win the Brownlow medal – all focussed negative attention on the club. Hafey, however, used the resentment to his advantage, telling his players "it's Richmond against the world".

Richmond showed signs of ageing in 1975, when they lost in the preliminary final. A raft of player departures made for a poor 1976 season, with the Tigers finishing seventh, Hafey's worst-ever result. He was re-appointed for 1977, but not unanimously (he had no contract with Richmond, instead being appointed on a year-to-year basis). When it leaked that Graeme Richmond, the club's powerbroker, had voted against Hafey's reappointment, Hafey immediately resigned.

=== Collingwood ===
Hafey's initial thought was to seek a job in Western Australia. However, a chance meeting with the new Collingwood president, John Hickey, took Hafey in a different direction. The Magpies had just endured their worst-ever season, finishing last. Hickey defied the club's tradition against hiring an outsider as coach, appointing Hafey to coach the club for the 1977 season.

Hafey was an instant success, taking the club from last to first in one year – the first time this had been achieved in the VFL. Collingwood had lost eleven of their last thirteen finals matches, many by slender margins, leading to the press to say the team was afflicted with a "disease" called the "Colliwobbles". The disease appeared defeated when the team beat the favoured Hawthorn by two points in the semi-final. In the 1977 Grand Final, Collingwood led North Melbourne by 27 points at three quarter time. Trainers and committeemen began to celebrate early and North Melbourne fought back to a draw. In the replay the following week, Collingwood lost a high-scoring contest.

Collingwood lost to North Melbourne in the 1978 Preliminary Final, leading to a number of personnel changes during the offseason. In 1979, the team returned to the 1979 Grand Final. After taking a second quarter led, Collingwood fell behind at the half. They ultimately lost by five points against Carlton. In the 1980 Grand Final, Hafey took on his old team of Richmond. Kevin Bartlett won the Norm Smith medal as the Tigers won by a record margin. The Magpies under Hafey again made the Grand Final in 1981 against Carlton. After holding a 21-point lead in the third, Collingwood gave up two late goals before the three-quarter-time break. The resulting disharmony in the Magpie huddle allowed the Blues to dominate the fourth quarter and win the game.

After years of disappointment, players and fans began to criticise Hafey's methods. Several leading players said Hafey over-trained the team, particularly in the lead-up to finals matches. Others said Hafey was too slow to respond when the team was going under. During the 1982 season, a record losing streak of nine games sealed Hafey's fate, and he was sacked mid-season.

=== Geelong ===
Hafey was given a three-year contract to coach Geelong in 1983. However, he was unable to engender the type of team spirit he created at Collingwood and Richmond, and the team did not make the finals during his tenure. During 1985, it became clear that Hafey's contract would not be renewed.

=== Sydney Swans ===
During the 1985 season, the VFL had sold the Sydney Swans to controversial medical entrepreneur Geoffrey Edelsten to create the first privately owned club. Franchising, club licensing, player drafts and salary caps were all concepts that the VFL was attempting to import into Australian football at a time of financial crisis. Edelsten quickly signed numerous star players away from Melbourne clubs by offering large contracts. He wanted to hire Kevin Sheedy, who had just coached Essendon to successive premierships. Sheedy turned Edelsten down, but urged the Swans' owner to sign his old mentor, Tom Hafey. Edelsten took the advice and signed Hafey for three years. The Sydney Swans under Hafey made the finals campaigns in 1986 and 1987, both of which ended at the First Semi Final.

== Coaching methods ==
Hafey's teams usually tackled hard, shepherded, persisted, smothered and backed each other up, aspects of the game now called "one-percenters". Supreme fitness was required to play this way, so Hafey put a strong emphasis on training. However, his training methods were sometimes labelled monotonous and he was described as tactically unsophisticated.

Hafey strongly believed in leaving players in their designated position, even if they were losing to their opponent, which attracted criticism when the team lost. By contrast, virtually all players are rotated in modern play as the coach seeks match-ups favourable to the team.

Hafey was prepared to back his players and build their confidence, contributing to a strong team spirit. His approach differed from most successful coaches who remained aloof from their players. He focussed on the team's camaraderie, in many cases becoming intimately involved with the lives of his charges and he sought to mix with them in social situations even though he was a teetotaller and non-smoker. All four teams that he coached improved immediately after Hafey's appointment. However, he also "lost" his players several times during his career as they rebelled against his training requirements.

=== Comparative coaching statistics ===
	Games coached	Won	Lost	Drawn	Win%	Finals	Win% (Finals)	Premierships
1. Mick Malthouse (31 seasons)	718	406	305	7	57%	42	54%	3
2. Jock McHale (38 seasons)	713	466	237	10	66%	58	47%	8
3. Kevin Sheedy (27 seasons)	678	386	242	7	61%	41	56%	4
4. Allan Jeans (26 seasons)	575	357	216	2	62%	41	54%	4
5. Tom Hafey (23 seasons)	522	336	182	4	65%	42	59%	4
6. David Parkin (22 seasons)	518	306	210	2	59%	38	53%	4
7. Ron Barassi (23 seasons)	515	275	236	4	54%	33	53%	4
8. Norm Smith (23 seasons)	452	253	192	7	57%	24	71%	6
9. Leigh Matthews (20 seasons)	461	267	186	8	59%	27	65%	4
10. Dick Reynolds (22 seasons)	415	275	134	6	67%	37	57%	4

Statistics up to the end of the 2023 AFL season.

== Later career ==
Returning to Melbourne in 1989, Hafey was employed by ABC radio as a football commentator. Although often mentioned as a possible candidate by the media whenever a coaching position fell vacant in the AFL, no job materialised. Hafey came to be seen as one of the old-school coaches, unsuited to the tactically sophisticated era. In his radio commentary, he rarely employed the jargon of the modern coach and believed that football is a simple game that had been over-complicated, that motivation comes from within and fitness is the basis for success.

Hafey fashioned a career as a self-styled "ambassador" for the game and a strident advocate for physical fitness in the wider society. A particular interest was the current plight of Australian football clubs in rural areas, who he believed have been neglected by the AFL since the competition was fully professionalised in the 1990s. He spoke regularly on football and/or fitness, always emphasising the benefits of a healthy lifestyle. Hafey also provided training advice to sporting clubs and schools, and gave motivational lectures.

== Personal fitness ==
Hafey's passion for fitness was legendary; every morning he woke up at 5:20 and went for an 8 km run, followed by 250 push-ups and a swim in Port Phillip Bay, and when he got home he did 700 crunches and sit-ups. He was a popular figure at St. Kilda beach, often greeting fellow joggers and cyclists.

In 2011, Hafey appeared in a TV commercial for Jeep Australia as part of their 70th Anniversary Campaign. The commercial shows him running and doing push-ups as part of his regular fitness routine.

== Death and legacy ==
An inaugural inductee to the Australian Football Hall of Fame 1996, Hafey was named coach of Richmond's team of the century in 1998. In 2003, the Tigers set up the "Tom Hafey club", a corporate networking group, in his honour.

In 2011, a book titled The Hafey Years – Reliving a golden era at Tigerland was published. It documents Hafey's involvement with Richmond as a player, and his run of success as a coach in the 1960s and 1970s. Hafey had previously resisted having a biography written about him; author Elliot Cartledge said he changed his stance "because The Hafey Years is not a biography but a chronicle of an era."

During AFL Grand Final week in 2011, Hafey was awarded the "Coaching Legend Award" by the AFL Coaches Association.

After a brief illness due to a secondary cancer, Hafey died at the age of 82 on 12 May 2014.

=== Coaching tree ===
At least 20 men that played under Hafey at Richmond later went on to success as coaches themselves. At VFL/AFL level, these include premiership coaches Tony Jewell (at Richmond), Kevin Sheedy (at Essendon) and Mick Malthouse (at Footscray, West Coast, Collingwood and Carlton), as well as Kevin Bartlett, Royce Hart, Francis Bourke, Paul Sproule, Mike Patterson, Mick Erwin (who replaced Hafey when he was sacked by Collingwood), Neil Balme, John Northey, Ian Stewart, and Barry Richardson. In addition, a number of his former players had important careers coaching at lower levels of the game, such as Merv Keane and Kevin Morris.

== Bibliography ==
- 1971 Tiger Year Book – Richmond Football Club
- Hogan P: The Tigers of Old, Richmond FC, Melbourne 1996
- Cartledge, E: The Hafey Years – Reliving a golden era at Tigerland, Weston Media & Communications, Melbourne 2011
