= Vin Catoggio =

Australian rules footballer, born 1954

Personal information
- Full name: Vincenzo Catoggio
- Born: 13 May 1954 (age 72)
- Original team: Princes Hill
- Height: 179 cm (5 ft 10 in)
- Weight: 78 kg (172 lb)

Playing career^{1}
Years	Club	Games (Goals)
1973–76, 1978–80	Carlton	71 (97)
1981–1982	Melbourne	9 (15)
1983	Sydney Swans	8 (9)
Total		88 (121)
- ^{1} Playing statistics correct to the end of 1983.

Vincenzo "Vin" Catoggio (born 13 May 1954) is a former Australian rules footballer in the Victorian Football League. He was noted for his outrageous afro haircut and because of this was considered one of the real characters of the game. He is of Italian descent and played for three VFL clubs.

== Family ==
He is the second son of the five children of Leonardo and Rocchina Catoggio. Leonardo arrived in Australia in 1938, and Rocchina in 1936. Both Vin's grandfathers — Carmine, and Vincenzo — arrived together in Australia, from Montemurro, Italy, in 1927, and their families arrived later.

Vin married Victoria Watson in 1982. They have two sons and one daughter.

== Football ==
In 1972 he won the Morrish Medal which was awarded to the player voted best and fairest in the VFL 19s.

In 1973 he won the Gardiner Medal which was awarded to the best and fairest player as adjudged by field umpires in the reserves competition. His first full game of VFL league football came in the 1973 VFL Grand Final. However, in 1974 he didn't play any games in the league side. In total he played 70 reserves games during his career.

In 1977 he moved Western Australia to play for Subiaco in the West Australian Football League (WAFL), but returned to Carlton in 1978.

Catoggio moved to Melbourne in 1981 as part of a deal that recruited Greg Wells to Carlton and played nine games over two years.

== After football ==
After retiring from playing football he became a painter and decorator.
