= Marty McMillan =

Australian rules footballer

Personal information
- Full name: Marty McMillan
- Born: 17 February 1953 (age 73)
- Original team: Mount Waverley
- Height: 180 cm (5 ft 11 in)
- Weight: 80 kg (176 lb)
- Position: Half forward flank

Playing career^{1}
Years	Club	Games (Goals)
1972–74	Richmond	26 (13)
1974–75	Footscray	7 (0)
Total		33 (13)
- ^{1} Playing statistics correct to the end of 1975.

Marty McMillan (born 17 February 1953) is a former Australian rules footballer who played for Richmond and Footscray in the Victorian Football League (VFL) during the early 1970s.

Recruited from Mount Waverley, McMillan was a half forward flanker in the 1972 VFL Grand Final loss to Carlton where he kicked two goals in the high scoring encounter. Although not a renowned goal-kicker, he had also kicked three goals against the same opponent in their drawn Semi Final earlier in the finals series. He finished his league career at Footscray, after transferring there midway through the 1974 season.
