= Royce Hart =

Australian rules footballer (born 1948)

Personal information
- Full name: Royce Desmond Hart
- Born: 10 February 1948 (age 78); Whitefoord, Tasmania
- Original team: Clarence U19 (TANFL)
- Height: 187 cm (6 ft 2 in)
- Weight: 86 kg (190 lb)
- Position: Centre half-forward

Playing career^{1}
| Years | Club | Games (Goals) |
| 1967–1977 | Richmond | 187 (369) |
| 1969 | Glenelg | 1 (2) |
| Total | | 188 (371) |

Representative team honours
| Years | Team | Games (Goals) |
| | Victoria | 11 (29) |

International team honours
| 1968 | "The Galahs" | |

Coaching career^{3}
| Years | Club | Games (W–L–D) |
| 1980–1982 | Footscray | 53 (8–45–0) |
- ^{1} Playing statistics correct to the end of 1977.^{3} Coaching statistics correct as of 1982.

Career highlights
- 4× VFL Premiership player: (1967, 1969, 1973, 1974); AFL Team of the Century; Tasmanian Team of the Century; Richmond Team of the Century; Michael Roach Medal 1967, 1971; 2× Jack Dyer Medal: (1969, 1972); All-Australian team: (1969); Richmond captain: (1972–1975); Australian Football Hall of Fame, inducted 1996, Legend status 2013; Richmond Hall of Fame, inducted 2002; Tasmanian Football Hall of Fame, inducted 2005; Tasmanian "Icon", conferred 2005; Richmond "Immortal", conferred 2008; 100 Tiger Treasures "Class of the Century"

Royce Desmond Hart (born 10 February 1948) is a former Australian rules footballer who played for the Richmond Football Club in the Victorian Football League (VFL).

Regarded as one of the greatest centre half-forwards to ever play Australian rules football, Hart was known for his trademark of leaping in from the side, and a left foot kick. Hart was an inaugural member of the Australian Football Hall of Fame, and was elevated to Legend status in 2013.

== Early days ==
Hart grew up in central Tasmania with an older brother, Lance, and two younger sisters, Gayle and Cheryl. He gravitated toward sports, in particular Australian football, which upset his mother, who thought the game too rough. Hart was educated at Clarence High School and participated in football and athletics. He played as a rover in the Tasmanian under-15 schoolboys team before his growth spurt, and held a junior high-jumping record for about 20 years. Playing on the ball helped develop his ground skills, but he was able to exert greater presence on the field after his growth spurt.

Hart was invited to Clarence in 1964 to play for the under-17s team. But because their season started late, he went and trained with the under-19s team. He went on to win the best first-year player award, and then won the best and fairest the following season.

These performances caught the attention of Harry Jenkins, the Tasmanian-based recruiting scout for Richmond. Acting on Jenkins' recommendation, club secretary Graeme Richmond flew to the island state to watch Hart in action, but he missed seeing Hart play. Nevertheless, Richmond was prepared to sign Hart sight unseen. Hart's mother warned that he would need suitable clothing to wear to work, which he didn't have. Richmond countered by offering the youngster a suit and six shirts, then posted papers to the Hart household, which were readily signed. At a time when untried players were asking VFL clubs for large signing fees, Richmond knew he had a bargain. Aged 17, Hart crossed Bass Strait determined to develop his precocious talent, which was unusual; most Tasmania players played a number of seasons in the local competition before crossing to Victoria as mature age recruits.

== Arrival at Richmond ==
Hart arrived in Melbourne with 20 pounds in his pocket (contrary to some accounts of his life, this money was his own and not provided by Richmond) and initially boarded with Graeme Richmond. He started work in a bank and began a comprehensive weight training regime at Frank Sedgman's gym; at the time of his arrival in Melbourne, Hart weighed only 10 stone 12 pounds (69 kg).

Hart started the 1966 VFL season playing in the Richmond under-19s coached by Ray "Slug" Jordon. During the season, Jordon made the mistake of including an unregistered player for a match. As punishment the VFL stripped the under-19s team of half its premiership points, causing the team to miss the finals. Hart had been the leading goalkicker for the under-19s when late in the season he was promoted to the reserves and played in the Reserves Grand Final against Collingwood, on a half forward flank. With just seconds to go, Collingwood led by one point when Hart took a mark about 60 metres out from goal. He promptly put a torpedo punt, his preferred kick at the time, through the goals to give Richmond the lead, and the siren sounded shortly afterward. During the off-season, Hart continued working on his physique and created an air of anticipation with his performances in the practice matches leading into the 1967 season.

== 1967 – A Dream Debut ==
In the first half of the twentieth century, Richmond had been a powerhouse club with a large supporter base, but the club fell on hard times in the 1950s. A rejuvenation of the club began with a move to the Melbourne Cricket Ground in 1965 and an extensive recruiting program, which included the young Hart.

Hart made his senior VFL debut in the opening round of the 1967 VFL season against Essendon at the MCG, playing at full forward. Although he got plenty of the ball in attack, he disappointed with his inaccurate goal-kicking, with three goals and seven behinds.

Subsequently, Hart taught himself to use the drop punt when kicking for a goal, and became one of the best exponents of the kick at a time when many players still favoured flat punts or drop kicks. In Round 4, he kicked an amazing goal, which bounced along the ground for the last thirty metres before going through, to win a match with Carlton. After only four games Hart was selected to play for the Victorian Second team, but a week before the game, Ron Barassi pulled out with injury and Hart was promoted. He booted seven goals playing at full-forward against Western Australia. With the Tigers on top of the ladder and heading for their first finals appearance since 1947, Hart was shifted to centre half forward, the position where he would make his name.

The Tigers went into the finals without a single player who had played finals before, which seemed the only chink in the team's armour. However, in the semi-final against Carlton, Hart led the way with a best afield performance and booted six goals. Two weeks later, Richmond played a Grand Final against Geelong considered as one of the classic matches of Australian football. Hart gathered 13 kicks and six handpasses but it was one of his seven marks that remains eternally etched in the memory. In the dying minutes, Hart rose above his opponent to grab the ball from a kick in by Geelong's Roy West and helped keep the momentum going the Tigers' way. In the end, Richmond hung on to win by nine points to end a 24-year premiership drought. Richmond's emphasis on attacking and kicking high scores became the new trend, and within a few years the game would be much more offense-orientated. To cap an extraordinary first year, Hart won the club goalkicking award, was voted recruit of the year and represented Australia in Ireland in the first contact between Australian and Gaelic football.

== Controversy, Another Premiership and That Autobiography ==
A let down followed in 1968. The year started badly when Hart was drafted into the army, which the club was able to defer for a year. Player and club performed in fits and starts for most of the year, before the team came roaring home, missing the finals by a whisker. A similar scenario was unfolding the following year, but the players pulled together and Richmond sneaked into the finals in fourth place. They then won all three finals to complete a remarkable turnaround, win the flag comfortably and leave everyone wondering what they might have done had they maintained concentration and made the 1968 finals. Hart had been the star player, winning his first best and fairest award, and he was made All-Australian after the 1969 Adelaide Carnival. This was a remarkable effort as he was based in Adelaide with the Royal Australian Artillery as part of his National Service. During the year, he actually trained with South Australian league club Glenelg and flew to Melbourne for matches. When Glenelg made the SA Grand Final, they asked Hart to play in the match. This move wasn't well received, particularly when it became known that Hart would get $2000 for 100 minutes of football. Hart kicked two goals as Glenelg slipped to a 65-point loss.

In 1970, Hart attracted major attention with the publication of The Royce Hart Story, a ghostwritten autobiography. Very few biographies of Australian football players had been released to that point, and never one by a current player, especially not one by somebody 22 years of age. Hart received universal criticism for naming a team of best players where he was placed at centre half forward. But the team was not a "greatest team ever", rather a team of the best contemporary players that Hart would like to play with.

The book contains some perceptive opinions about the future of Australian football. As an insider who realised many players at the highest level were being poorly compensated for the increasing time commitment required for the ever-improving skill and fitness standards of League football, Hart was one of the most vocal advocates of full-time professionalism; in a somewhat prophetic statement, he suggested the formation of a players’ union, which up to that stage had been non-existent in the football community. Just three years later, the VFL Players' Association was formed.

Hart also wrote about his dedication to making the most of his talents and what it takes to succeed. At times, Hart also reveals the somewhat uncompromising attitude that could often get him offside with people. Notably, he had a number of disagreements with teammate Kevin Sheedy.

After missing the 1970 finals, Richmond finished third in 1971. Now vice-captain, Hart finished second best and fairest, was again leading goalkicker and passed his century of games.

== Captaincy and later career ==
Nominated captain to succeed the ageing Roger Dean, in 1972 Hart won the best and fairest, scored a career-high seven goals against South Melbourne and led the team into the finals. Hart was dominant in the lead-up finals, but he was overwhelmed in the Grand Final when Richmond lost a famously high-scoring match to Carlton. Pitted against the man who became his hardest opponent, Bruce Doull, Hart was unable to stop the Tigers suffering a loss that shocked his overconfident club.

An early highlight in 1973 came when Hart captained Victoria against South Australia. Unfortunately, Hart's courageous style now began to catch up with him, and in Round 15 against St Kilda he tore cartilage in his left knee. He missed the next four matches, doing gym work to strengthen the muscles around his knee.

Hart was back in time for what would be a memorable finals series. In the Qualifying Final defeat to arch-rivals Carlton, Hart kicked five goals and was among Richmond's best players. He was again among the best players in the cut-throat Semi-final against St Kilda, but he had to get his knee drained of fluid the following Monday and continued limping until the Wednesday. Desperate to have him play, the selectors put him on the bench (in this era a replacement could only be used once, similar to the modern-day substitute) for the Preliminary Final against Collingwood and watched forlornly as the Tigers slipped to a six-goal deficit at half time. Coach Tom Hafey took a big risk by bringing Hart on at this point; Hart's inspirational performance in booting two goals lifted the Tigers to an amazing victory, thus underlining Hart's reputation as one of the truly great leaders in the game. In the 1973 VFL Grand Final, Hart dominated against Carlton, winning 19 possessions, seven marks and kicking three goals, even though his knee had improved only marginally since the previous week.

But the cloud of injury hung constantly over his head. For 1974, Richmond sought to ease his workload by using rookie David Cloke as a second centre half-forward. Hart got through most games, and he played brilliantly in the finals against another top opponent in North Melbourne's David Dench. Richmond easily disposed of the upcoming North in the Grand Final, and Hart held the premiership cup aloft for a second time.

North turned the tables in the 1975 finals series. Once again, injury problems forced Hart to the bench in the preliminary final and he was brought on with his team behind in the third term. Hart immediately goaled, but this time the effort was in vain and Richmond lost. Hart believed it prudent to hand over the captaincy to Francis Bourke. A number of premiership players left the club, and the Tigers faced a rebuilding period.

Injuries compounded Richmond's problems, and the team slumped to seventh in 1976, a season when Hart only played half of the games. Pressure was placed on coach Tom Hafey, and he eventually resigned after being reappointed for the next year, to be replaced by Barry Richardson.

With the change of coach for 1977, it was decided that Hart's body would need nursing through a tough season, and he was used on the backline. It was an unedifying spectacle for Richmond fans, all of whom idolised him, to see the greatest forward of the era slugging it out in a back pocket. Another knee injury mid-season left Hart with a choice: more major surgery or retirement. He chose the latter and was appointed a skills coach with Richmond.

== Coaching Stints and Life After Football ==
Hart had great success individually tutoring another Tasmanian, Michael Roach, who became Hart's successor on the forward line. Like Hart, Roach became known for his accurate and penetrating drop punts. After coaching the Richmond reserves in 1979, Hart decided to take the coaching position at the struggling Footscray (now Western Bulldogs), to fulfil an ambition he stated in his autobiography a decade earlier. Richmond earned derision when they asked Footscray for a clearance fee for his services – Hart quickly recalled the price they had paid to get him to Melbourne in the first place. Hart's stint at the club was troubled. He set very high fitness standards and summarily sacked players who couldn't meet those standards, turning over many players in the process. The Bulldogs were a club that had accepted mediocrity for too long and needed to take a step back before they progressed.

Under Hart, the Bulldogs won just seven games in his first two years, but had one notable moment of glory when Kelvin Templeton won the Brownlow medal in 1980. Hart had taken on Templeton, a century-goalkicker who was seen as a little bit brittle, as a personal project, getting him on a weight program and moving him to his old position at centre half forward. It seemed that Hart worked well with those who were similarly talented and motivated as himself, but struggled to relate to those who were not. This is a common refrain in Australian football: simply put, the best players don't always make the best coaches.

The 1982 season began with Hart under immense pressure. There was talk that Footscray may be relocated and the club's finances were under scrutiny in the wake of South Melbourne's move to Sydney. On opening day, the Bulldogs copped a 109-point flogging from Essendon and a 143-point loss to Hawthorn followed in Round 3. After just one win in the first ten rounds, Hart left the Western Oval. Coincidentally, in the same week, Hart's old mentor Tom Hafey lost his job at Collingwood. The cash-strapped Footscray had disingenuously demoted Hart to Thirds coach to avoid a payout clause in the contract had he been sacked. In the mid-1980s, Footscray improved markedly under coach Mick Malthouse, and some observers of the club were prepared to argue that Hart had done the hard spade work necessary to get the team competitive.

Hart returned to Punt Road and coached the reserves again, in 1984. During the Tigers' tumultuous years in the mid-1980s, there was some speculation that he would be appointed coach of the club, but this never happened. Hart was one of a number of ex-Richmond players to speak about the club's financial troubles in 1989–1990. During the Save Our Skins appeal, he urged members to sign up and stay with the club.

In the 1990s, Hart returned to his native Tasmania, living on a farm and involving himself in commentating for the ABC and junior football. Eldest son Damien played at his old club Clarence, while another son, Simon, spent a couple of years on Richmond's supplementary list at the turn of the century. For a number of years, Hart had little official contact with the Tigers, a situation that drew criticism to Richmond – the club was seen to be indifferent to some of its ex-players. The Tigers moved to rectify this a few years ago, which pleased many followers of the club, as Hart was the best-loved player among the fans during the club's greatest era.

In late November 2010, it was reported that Hart had been admitted into intensive care in Hobart after severe complications which resulted from a hernia. He was due to have gone to Melbourne earlier that month to present his number four guernsey to Dustin Martin. Tom Hafey conducted the presentation ceremony in Hart's place. He made a full recovery.

Hart was an inaugural inductee to the Australian Football Hall of Fame in 1996, and he was named at centre half-forward in the AFL Team of the Century that same year. In 2013, he became the 25th player to be elevated to the status of Legend in the Hall of Fame.

== See also ==
- Team of the Century 1996

== Bibliography ==
- Collins, Ben (2006). The Champions: Conversations with Great Players and Coaches of Australian Football. Docklands: Geoff Slattery Publishing. ISBN 0-9757964-4-5.
- Hart, Royce (1970). The Royce Hart Story. Melbourne: Nelson.
- Hansen, Brian (1992). Tigerland: The History of the Richmond Football Club from 1885 (2nd ed.). Burwood, Victoria: Richmond Former Players and Officials Association. ISBN 0-7316-5047 6.* Hogan P: The Tigers Of Old, Richmond FC, (Melbourne), 1996. ISBN 0-646-18748-1
- Holmesby R & Main J: Encyclopaedia of AFL Footballers, BAS Publishing, Melbourne 2004
