= Brian Roberts (Australian rules footballer) =

Australian rules footballer, born 1945

Brian Stuart Roberts
- Roberts at the Duke of Wellington

Personal information
- Born: 28 April 1945; Barnsley
- Died: 6 August 2016 (aged 71)
- Original team: South Adelaide Football Club
- Height: 198 cm (6 ft 6 in)
- Weight: 120 kg (265 lb)

Playing career^{1}
Years	Club	Games (Goals)
1968–1970	East Fremantle	57 (46)
1971–1975	Richmond	78 (34)
1975	South Melbourne	15 (2)
Total		150 (83)
- ^{1} Playing statistics correct to the end of 1975.

Career highlights
- Richmond premiership player: 1973 & 1974; South Australia Carnival team 1966; Western Australian Carnival team 1969, Victoria State Team 1972

Brian Stuart Roberts (28 April 1945 – 6 August 2016) was an Australian rules football player who played in the VFL between 1971 and 1975 for the Richmond Football Club (as well as a short stint with South Melbourne in 1975). Roberts was known as "The Whale" due to his enormous stature and played as a ruckman. He was the only player to have represented all three state teams: South Australia, Victoria and Western Australia.

== Early life ==
Roberts was born in the UK, and with his family emigrated to Millicent, South Australia. In his late teens, the 199 cm ruckman was attracting interest from VFL clubs, but the new South Adelaide coach, Neil Kerley, persuaded Roberts to join the Club.

== SANFL ==
Roberts joined South Adelaide in 1964 and debuted the following year. He learnt the craft of being a ruckman from his teammate and coach Neil Kerley.

== WAFL ==
Robert spent four seasons with East Fremantle; it included being selected in the Western Australian state team in 1969.

== VFL ==
Richmond enticed him to Victoria, where he played from 1971–1975, and he was a premiership player in 1973 and 1974. He also represented Victoria in interstate games.

Roberts was part of the John Pitura trade in which Pitura went to Richmond in exchange for Roberts, Francis Jackson and Graham Teasdale. In the 15 games he played with South Melbourne, he caught the attention of the umpires and was second in the Brownlow Medal.

In the 1976 pre-season, he had a disagreement with coach Ian Stewart and walked out on South Melbourne.

Roberts was a publican and for many years had a hotel in South Melbourne. "Have a ale with the Whale" was his motto. In the 1990s, he took over the licensee of the Duke of Wellington Hotel in Flinders St. Additionally, he wrote newspaper columns and did radio football commentary.

He died on 6 August 2016, aged 71.
