= David Dickson (footballer) =

Australian rules footballer

Personal information
- Born: 12 May 1952 (age 74)
- Original team: Preston
- Debut: Round 3, 1972, Carlton vs. South Melbourne, at Lake Oval
- Height: 183 cm (6 ft 0 in)
- Weight: 72 kg (159 lb)

Playing career^{1}
Years	Club	Games (Goals)
1971	Preston	11 (17)
1972–1976	Carlton	66 (23)
Total		77 (40)
- ^{1} Playing statistics correct to the end of 1976.

David Dickson (born 12 May 1952) is a former Australian rules footballer who played for Carlton in the VFL during the 1970s.

Dickson, who went to school in Coburg, played his early football in the VFA with Preston. He made his Carlton debut in 1972, the same game that Alex Jesaulenko celebrated his 100th, and finished the year playing on the wing in their premiership side. Another Grand Final appearance followed in 1973 and Dickson, again playing as a wingman, finished on the losing team. In 1977 he was part of the trade which saw Peter McKenna come to Carlton but Dickson couldn't make it into the Collingwood seniors and played reserves football for the club instead.

After retiring as a player, Dickson moved into coaching and from 1998 was in charge of the Victorian Metropolitan Under 18s at the National Championships.
