= Garry Crane =

Australian rules footballer

Personal information
- Born: 25 August 1944 (age 82)
- Original teams: Yallourn, Yallourn North
- Debut: Round 17, 1964, Carlton vs. St Kilda, at Princes Park
- Height: 179 cm (5 ft 10 in)
- Weight: 77 kg (170 lb)

Playing career^{1}
Years	Club	Games (Goals)
1964–1976	Carlton	148 (16)
- ^{1} Playing statistics correct to the end of 1976.

Career highlights
- 1965 3rd Reserves Best & Fairest; 1968 Perc Bentley Trophy -3rd Best & Fairest; 1969 Robert Reynolds Memorial Trophy; 1972 3rd Reserves Best & Fairest; 1973 6th Best & Fairest; 1974 Equal 7th Best & Fairest; 1975 4th Reserves Best & Fairest

Garry Crane (born 25 August 1944) is a former Australian rules footballer in the Victorian Football League.

Crane was recruited to Carlton Football Club from Yallourn North Football Club after winning the club's best and fairest award in 1962 and 1963. He made his debut for Carlton in Round 17, 1964 and played in three VFL premiership teams – 1968, 1970 and 1972. He was rated the best player on the ground by the voting panel of The Age newspaper in the 1968 Grand Final.

Crane won Carlton's best and fairest award in 1969. He was a two-time Murie Cup winner in 1973 and 1974, as the leading combined votegetter in the seniors Brownlow Medal and reserves Gardiner Medal among players who polled in both. He retired at the end of the 1976 season.
