= Francis Bourke =

Australian rules footballer, born 1947

Personal information
- Born: 2 April 1947 (age 79); Caulfield, Victoria
- Original team: Nathalia
- Debut: 13 May 1967, Richmond vs. Hawthorn, at MCG
- Height: 185 cm (6 ft 1 in)
- Weight: 84 kg (185 lb)
- Position: Wing/Defender

Playing career^{1}
Years	Club	Games (Goals)
1967–1981	Richmond	300 (71)

Coaching career
Years	Club	Games (W–L–D)
1982–1983	Richmond	46 (26–20–0)
- ^{1} Playing statistics correct to the end of 1983.

Career highlights
- 5× Richmond premiership player 1967, 1969, 1973, 1974, 1980; Richmond Team of the Century; Jack Dyer Medal 1970; Richmond Captain 1976–1977; Richmond Coach 1982–1983; Richmond Life Member 1976; Richmond Hall of Fame, inducted 2002; Richmond "Immortal", conferred 2005; 100 Tiger Treasures "Brave Act of the Century"; Australian Football Hall of Fame, inducted 2002; AFL Team of the Century; Interstate Games: 13; Victorian captain 1977, 1980

Francis William Bourke (born 2 April 1947) is a former Australian rules footballer and coach who represented Richmond in the Victorian Football League (VFL) between 1967 and 1981, and coached the club in 1982 and 1983.

A key figure in a successful period at Richmond, Bourke is a five-time premiership player who was honoured with selection in the AFL Team of the Century. His is the only family to have provided three generations of players for the Richmond senior team: Bourke's father, Frank, played 16 matches in the 1940s; and his son, David, played 85 games between 1995 and 2001. In 2009, The Australian newspaper nominated Bourke as one of the 25 greatest footballers never to win a Brownlow Medal.

== Early life ==
Bourke's father, Frank, was serving in the RAAF and on leave in Melbourne when he played a solitary game for Richmond in 1943. A tall (193 cm) and lean (85 kg) full-forward with an excellent reputation in country football, Frank returned to the city after the war and resumed his playing career with Richmond. In the opening weeks of the 1946 season, Frank kicked five or more goals six times in the first seven matches to lead the VFL goalkicking table. Injury curtailed further progress. Bourke was born the following year in Caulfield.

Bourke was raised on the family's dairy farm, about 40 km north west of Shepparton in northern Victoria, where his father was appointed captain-coach of his home town team, Nathalia. He attended Assumption College, a Catholic school with a reputation as a nursery for great footballing talent. In the following decades, Assumption was to produce dozens of footballers for the VFL/AFL, and Bourke would go on to be, arguably, its greatest sporting product. His success was achieved despite a severe setback at age 14 when doctors detected a heart murmur and recommended that he give up playing sport.

After a season in Assumption's first team in 1963, Bourke left school aged 16 and returned to Nathalia. He turned out for the local team, following in the footsteps of his father by playing as a key forward. However, the young Bourke was physically very different from his father, standing 185 cm and eventually filling out to a solid, muscular 85 kg. In his first senior season, Bourke was the team's leading goalkicker and followed up by winning the club best and fairest in 1965.

These performances hadn't escaped the eye of Richmond secretary Graeme Richmond. Aware of the youngster's pedigree, Richmond arranged for Bourke to play a handful of matches with the Tigers' seconds in 1965. Bourke didn't qualify as a Richmond player under the father–son rule (Frank Bourke hadn't played enough senior games), but few of the other VFL clubs had shown interest in him. Once again, in 1966, Bourke spent the season playing for Nathalia and came down to the city on a match permit to play with the Richmond seconds on a handful of occasions.

== The quiet country recruit ==
At this point, Bourke was not confident of making the grade as a league footballer. He was convinced to move to Melbourne for the 1967 season by the prospect of playing a few senior games, enough to make him credentialled to coach country clubs. As it proved, Bourke's timing was exquisite. He debuted for Richmond as a second rover (to Kevin Bartlett), but after a few games was switched to a wing, forming a brilliant centreline with Dick Clay and Bill Barrot. A mobile player with good marking skills, Bourke was part of the experiment by Richmond to use tall players on the wing as part of their long-kicking game plan. Within a few years, most men playing on the wing in league football would be of similar physique to Bourke.

By the end of the season, Bourke's thoughts about returning to the bush had evaporated. Richmond won its first premiership in 24 years and the centreline of Bourke–Barrot–Clay was acknowledged as the best in the game and a key reason for the Tigers' success. The following season, Bourke made his debut for Victoria and finished third in the best and fairest. Another flag followed in 1969, and then Bourke had his best season in 1970, winning his only best and fairest award.

== "St Francis" ==
Bourke's name became a byword for courage. His persistence was recognised by Richmond when it awarded him the club's "Most Determined" trophy in 1967, 1972, 1977 and 1980. Just as he had continued to play after being warned not to when a teenager, Bourke often played with injuries that would have incapacitated others. In 1971, in a game against Hawthorn, he unwittingly broke a bone in his leg, but he continued to play until the extent of his injury was realised; he then managed to walk off the ground. The injury, serious enough to keep him off the field for the next nine games, became essential to the legend of Bourke's determination. He was also a great finals player, and he received a trophy as best player in Richmond's unsuccessful finals campaign of 1972.

Following their thrashing in the 1972 Grand Final, the Tigers decided that the team's defence required bolstering, so Bourke was shifted to half-back. Going into the 1973 finals, Bourke suffered a severe knee injury that put his career in doubt, yet, despite running with a visible limp, he was a stand-out in the Grand Final, playing on Carlton matchwinner Alex Jesaulenko. Richmond won back-to-back flags in 1973–1974, and Bourke was one of the team's stars.

== Captain, then elder statesman ==
In 1976, Bourke was appointed captain of the club and he responded with a great season, although the team slipped down the ladder. He finished third in the Brownlow medal and third in the club's best and fairest award, demonstrating a phenomenal consistency; in nine seasons between 1968 and 1976, Bourke was placed seven times in the best and fairest count.

However, the first signs of advancing age showed the following year. Bourke was so disappointed with his form at one point he privately contemplated retirement, but he continued on and proved his mettle by captaining Victoria against West Australia and leading Richmond into the finals. Key position defenders were in short supply at Richmond, so Bourke was forced to play at centre half back even though he lacked height for the position. At the end of the season, he decided to resign the captaincy in an effort to prolong his career.

This decision paid off in 1980, when the Tigers returned to power and again won the premiership. Due to his slowing leg speed, Bourke was now at full back but still a formidable opponent. Two weeks before the finals, Bourke entered football folklore in a match at Arden Street against North Melbourne. Bourke received an accidental finger in the eye, which quickly filled with blood that poured down his face and on to his guernsey. At the time there was no "blood rule" (requiring bleeding players to leave the field until the bleeding is stopped) and Bourke shifted to the forward line. Although he could barely see through the mass of blood, he dived full-length to take a chest mark, then kicked an important goal to ensure Richmond had a narrow win.

Bourke, along with Kevin Bartlett, played in all five Richmond premierships of the era, which constitutes the club record. Aged 34, he decided to soldier on in 1981 and became only the third Tiger to play 300 games. However, his form was not always equal to the personal standard that he had set and when it became obvious that Richmond wouldn't make the finals to defend the premiership, Bourke retired. Note that changes to the way records are compiled was made after Bourke's retirement, and his official games tally has been reduced to an even 300, of which 23 were finals and six Grand Finals.

== Coach ==
Just months after his playing retirement, Bourke was controversially pitched into the coaching position at Punt Road. The Tigers had decided to sack Tony Jewell, a premiership teammate of Bourke, just twelve months after he coached Richmond to the 1980 premiership. Although few doubted that Bourke was coaching material, the nature of his appointment and his lack of coaching experience at any level were significant hurdles to overcome. However, in 1982 Bourke took the Tigers to only their third minor premiership since the war and impressed critics with a brilliant tactical display in the semi-final against Carlton. Bourke made a series of positional changes at the beginning of the game and ordered his men to slow down the Carlton play-on game, giving away fifteen-metre penalties as necessary. The Tigers won easily, and Bourke became one of only a handful of coaches to make the Grand Final in his first season.

The dream debut of a premiership was not to be. In the 1982 VFL Grand Final, Richmond led by 11 points at half time, only for Carlton to kick five unanswered goals in the third quarter and run away with the premiership by 18 points.

During the off-season, the Tigers suffered an exodus of disgruntled star players that rocked the club and lost nine of the first eleven games in 1983. Media speculation about the security of Bourke's position began in earnest, and few believed the club when Richmond denied that there was an ongoing crisis. Although the team improved in the second half of the season, further player departures were mooted if Bourke remained as coach. It seemed that his hard-training style was not appreciated by all of his charges. Reluctantly, Bourke tendered his resignation at the end of the season, well aware that he would probably have been sacked had he not done so. His winning rate over the two seasons was a very reasonable 56.5%

== Third generation ==
Unfortunately, Bourke became one of the club's many great servants who were treated poorly by Richmond and endured a period of estrangement from Punt Road. Bourke had a stint as a specialist coach for Melbourne during the 1980s, and finally returned to Richmond in 1992 as chairman of selectors. He stood down from the position when his son David (born 9 January 1976) was recruited by the Tigers as a father-son selection in the 1994 AFL draft. At 193 cm and just 80 kg, David was built like his grandfather. His career suffered from an inability to bulk up to a heavier weight, and he was frustratingly inconsistent. David inherited his father's fanatical desire to win the ball; however, his body wasn't built to take the punishment that this approach entailed. After 85 games in seven seasons (many of which started on the bench), David Bourke was traded to the Kangaroos for the 2002 season, but only managed one game in blue and white.

For many years, Bourke was involved in the pub trade and was a more than useful cricketer with the Camberwell Cricket Club. In 1996, his ground-breaking play as a wingman earned him that position in the AFL's Team of the Century. He is also a hall-of-famer and life member of the AFL. Richmond have honoured him on a number of occasions, most notably in 2005 when he was named as one of four "immortals" of the club. The annual award for "Best Clubman", bestowed during the club's Best and Fairest count is named in his honour.

In September 2007 he was the subject of a Toyota Legendary Moments advertisement with Stephen Curry and Dave Lawson. The advertisement pays reference to the time when Bourke played an entire quarter with a broken leg, and also to when he collided with a teammate which opened up a cut to his head that bled profusely into his eye. Although Bourke could hardly see, he managed a spectacular diving chest mark and converted the kick to a match winning goal.

== See also ==
Australian Football Hall of Fame
