= David McKay (Australian footballer) =

Australian rules footballer

Personal information
- Full name: David McKay
- Born: 5 November 1949 (age 76)
- Original team: Newlyn
- Height: 191 cm (6 ft 3 in)
- Weight: 91 kg (201 lb)

Playing career^{1}
Years	Club	Games (Goals)
1969–1981	Carlton	263 (277)
- ^{1} Playing statistics correct to the end of 1981.

Career highlights
- 4x VFL premiership player: (1970, 1972, 1979, 1981); Carlton Football Club Hall of Fame – Legend status

David McKay (born 5 November 1949) is a former Australian rules footballer who played for the Carlton Blues during the 1970s.

In 1970, in just his second season of VFL football McKay won a premiership with Carlton and was voted as best on ground in the grand final. Originally from Newlyn, he was also part of winning grand finals in 1972,79 and 1981. The latter was his final game of VFL football and he retired with 263 games and 277 goals for the club.
