= Ian Stewart (Australian rules footballer) =

Australian rules footballer, born 1943

Personal information
- Full name: Ian Harlow Stewart
- Born: 14 July 1943 (age 83); Queenstown, Tasmania
- Original team: Queenstown (SFL)
- Debut: 20 April 1963, St Kilda vs. Melbourne, at Junction Oval
- Height: 179 cm (5 ft 10 in)
- Weight: 81 kg (179 lb)

Playing career^{1}
Years	Club	Games (Goals)
1962	Hobart	13 (?)
1963–1970	St Kilda	127 (25)
1971–1975	Richmond	78 (55)
Total		218 (80)

Representative team honours
Years	Team	Games (Goals)
	Victoria	20 (20)

Coaching career
Years	Club	Games (W–L–D)
1976–1977	South Melbourne	45 (22–22–1)
1978	Carlton	3 (1–2–0)
1979–1981	South Melbourne	66 (27–39–0)
Total		114 (50–63–1)
- ^{1} Playing statistics correct to the end of 1975.

Career highlights
- 2× VFL Premiership player: 1966, 1973; 3× Brownlow Medal: 1965, 1966, 1971; 2× St Kilda Best and Fairest: 1964, 1966; Jack Dyer Medal: 1971; All-Australian team: 1966; St Kilda captain: 1969; Championship of Australia Championship: 1973; Australian Football Hall of Fame, inducted 1996, Legend 1997; St Kilda Team of the Century: (centre); Richmond Team of the Century; St Kilda Hall of Fame Legend; Richmond Hall of Fame; Australian Sports Medal: 2000

Ian Harlow Stewart (né Cervi; born 14 July 1943) is a former Australian rules footballer who played for the St. Kilda Football Club and Richmond Football Club in the Victorian Football League (VFL). He later coached South Melbourne and Carlton before returning to St. Kilda to serve as general manager.

Stewart is one of only four men to win the Brownlow Medal three times (the others being Haydn Bunton Sr., Dick Reynolds, and Bob Skilton), and the only one to do so at two different clubs; he is also the most recent player to have achieved three Brownlow Medals. He was an inaugural inductee into the Australian Football Hall of Fame in 1996 and was elevated to Legend status the following year.
He will be remembered as an exponent of Australian football, a player with a blend of skill, concentration and courage who formed partnerships with Darrel Baldock and Royce Hart. Coincidentally, all three men hailed from Tasmania during a period when the country's smallest state contributed talent to the national game.

== Early life and career ==
Stewart was born Ian Cervi in the mining town of Queenstown in western Tasmania. He was the son of Italian migrant Aldo Liberale Cervi, who had come with his father to work in the mines, and Queenstown local Anita Stewart, whom Cervi married. When they split three years later, Stewart moved out with his mother and adopted her maiden surname to protect her identity. Stewart would not see his father again until a family reunion in Melbourne in 1972, just months before his father's death.

As a teenager growing up in Hobart, Stewart turned out for the Macalburn club and spent spare time watching Tasmanian Football League club North Hobart training and playing. The North Hobart players knew him well and were bemused when he joined North's archrival, Hobart. Stewart started there in 1962 as an eighteen-year-old. After just four senior games, Stewart impressed sufficiently to earn selection for the state team to play against Victoria. This was a great opportunity to display his talents: playing in the centre, he was matched against Alastair Lord, who went on to win the Brownlow medal that year. At the end of the season, Stewart paid his own way to Melbourne in an attempt to break into the Victorian Football League (VFL). Stewart was keen to play for St Kilda. The Saints had been vigorously recruiting players from all over the country in an attempt to win their first ever premiership. They had a number of Tasmanian players in their ranks and the previous year had recruited the Apple Isle's star player, Darrel Baldock. Like virtually every young footballer in Tasmania at the time, Stewart idolised Baldock and wanted to play alongside him. Several other VFL clubs were impressed by Stewart's performance against Victoria and wanted to sign him, while St Kilda believed he needed another year in Tasmania to develop. However, he leveraged the interest of the other clubs and St Kilda won the services of the determined teenager.

Stewart's arrival in the big time was subdued. He arrived at pre-season training with his own guernsey as he was too shy to ask the club to provide one. Stewart was named on the wing on his VFL debut against then powerhouse club Melbourne at the Junction Oval. Three other players were also making their debut for the Saints that day: Carl Ditterich, Bob Murray and Jim Wallis. Ditterich starred in a best-on-ground performance and would go on to enjoy a colourful 285-game career. Stewart's game was quiet due to a heavy knock, but he nonetheless developed into a quality player. Clearly, the Saints were putting together a brilliant team. The club's supporters realised as the season unfolded that they had an equally good player in Stewart. Possessing the most valued asset that a midfielder in Australian football can have – balance – Stewart was also a prolific ball winner and consummate user of the ball once it was in his sure grip. His ability to pass the ball to Baldock bordered on the telepathic and he was an excellent overhead mark for a small man. St Kilda coach Allan Jeans quickly realised that the new boy needed to be in the play as much as possible, so he was switched into the centre, where he remained for the rest of his career. The Stewart-Baldock combination drove the Saints into the finals, where they were unlucky to lose the semi-final to Melbourne due to inaccurate kicking in the last quarter.

Success appeared tantalisingly close to the game's perennial underachievers. However, controversy derailed the Saints' 1964 season. The club's administration had decided to accept an offer to relocate to outer-suburban Moorabbin, thus abandoning their spiritual home of almost one hundred years. The furore lasted for months, although history showed that the club was actually ahead of the times in their strategic thinking. The emotion over uprooting the club was a distraction for the team (which slumped to sixth on the ladder) but not for Stewart. He won his first Trevor Barker Award (club best and fairest) in 1964 in what proved to be the first in a string of individual accolades.

== Premiership success and subsequent burnout ==
The 1965 season and the move to Moorabbin was a huge success. Starting with more than 51,000 at the opening game, the Saints packed them in at their new home. In Round 9, in front of more than 72,000 at the MCG, St Kilda seized top place from Melbourne with a big win, then held on for the remainder of the season to win the minor premiership for the first time. The momentum continued; two days after the last game, Stewart was a surprise winner of the game's highest award, the Brownlow medal. He had tied with North Melbourne's Noel Teasdale, but the medal went to Stewart on a countback (Teasdale received a retrospective award 24 years later). Then St Kilda won into the Grand Final in a thrilling semi-final against Collingwood, decided by only one point. The medal win did not deflect Stewart's concentration – he dominated. His team were into only their second Grand Final, the first for 52 years. As St Kilda had not won a single premiership in its 93-year existence, it looked like history in the making.

Essendon after beating Collingwood, advanced to the Grand Final. St. Kilda players and coach overtrained during the week and were unprepared on the match day. The Bombers, finals veterans, had the game won by three quarter time. Stewart was named his team's best player.

The following season, the Saints jumped out of the blocks and after winning the first eight games there was speculation that they could go through undefeated. Naturally, talk like that precipitated a slump, and by the last game, they were in danger of sliding right out of the finals if they lost. Thanks to Baldock, the Saints pulled a tight game out of the fire and went into the finals as equal favourites for the flag.

Back in the 1960s, the Brownlow vote count was broadcast live on radio on the Monday following the end of the home-and-away season. As the reigning Brownlow medallist, Stewart thought he would only poll 14 or 15 votes, adding that he felt his last three or four games of the season had been poor. But by the end of the broadcast, Stewart had won his second successive Brownlow with 21 votes, winning by four from Carlton star John Nicholls, the first player to win back-to-back Brownlows since Dick Reynolds in 1937 and 1938. At the time of the broadcast, Stewart had been staying at a friend's place in Seaford and was ill with gastroenteritis, but went later that evening to a television studio to be congratulated by club officials and the media.

However, in the semi-final rematch (from the previous year) with Collingwood, Stewart was blanketed by Colin Tully and the Saints went down by ten points. Stewart bounced back with a best afield performance the following week, guiding his team to a revenge win over Essendon and keeping alive the dream of a first flag.

The Saints managed a one point victory over Collingwood in the 1966 Grand Final, which stands as one of the celebrated games of Australian football. On top of this achievement, Stewart also won All-Australian selection and a second club best and fairest.

After reaching the summit, it was a lot harder to go back up. St Kilda suffered a premiership hangover and missed the 1967 finals, then battled into fourth place for the 1968 finals. They only got there thanks to an eight-goal win over Geelong in the final round but, facing the same opposition in the semi-final, lost by 44 points – a 92-point turnaround in a week. On the day, Stewart lowered his colours to West Australian Dennis Marshall, who dominated the game. Stewart was made captain for 1969, but the team could manage only seventh place and tension arose between the captain and his coach, Allan Jeans. Stewart resigned the position at season's end, then went missing for pre-season training.

Although Stewart returned to play the 1970 season—and the Saints made the preliminary final—he was clearly unhappy. Struggling with injury, his relationship with Jeans was still strained, and he was sometimes played out of position at half-forward. He had no impact on the only final game he played of that year, and made it clear he wanted to leave the club. Some thought that Stewart was finished at 27 years of age. Reflecting back on that time 40 years later, Stewart was more circumspect:

I'd lost my dedication, I needed a new challenge. I wasn't as involved as much as I should have been. Maybe I was burnt out like Mark Thompson. I wasn't getting on well with 'Jeansy', but I've since realized it was my fault, not Allan Jeans' fault.

== Famous swap ==
In 1971, the idea that two star players would be traded for each other was uncharted territory for Australian football (although Richmond was to be once again involved in controversy in 1975 when they pushed their luck too far and swapped the future Brownlow medallist Graham Teasdale, state representative ruckman Brian "The Whale" Roberts, and talented half-back-flanker Francis Jackson for South Melbourne's John Pitura, who was only to play 38 senior games at Richmond in three years).

The VFL had only recently sanctioned transfer fees, which usually amounted to no more than a couple of thousand dollars, but top line players did not swap clubs, and certainly not dual Brownlow medallists. Stewart wanted to break that trend, but he knew that the prevailing culture demanded that he be discreet. He let Richmond secretary Allan Schwab (who had worked briefly at St Kilda a few years earlier) know that he would be interested in moving to Punt Road if a deal could be worked. Stewart's rival during the 1960s for the title of best centreman in the VFL was Richmond's Billy Barrot. The two had parallel careers, and although Stewart was acknowledged as the better player, the Victorian selectors had played Barrot 11 times, Stewart only three. The two men were a stark contrast: Barrot was a burst player, specialising in the booming drop-kick into the forward line (often from the centre circle into the goal-square) and the extravagant gesture; and, although devastating and spectacular, he was also moody and undisciplined and was subsequently diagnosed with bipolar disorder. After dominating in two premiership victories, the Richmond hierarchy felt that Barrot's faults outweighed his attributes and that his time was up at Punt Road.

Richmond used the Barrot situation as a pretext to recruit Stewart, who had told St Kilda he would probably go to Perth and find a coaching job in the league there. Gradually, Richmond stimulated St Kilda's interest in recruiting Barrot when it became clear that he would not be continuing with the Tigers. When the Saints were eventually prepared to sign Barrot, Stewart made a late request to go to Richmond, ostensibly saving St Kilda a transfer fee. Stewart described the situation as a "sting...but it was a good sting".

The football community was stunned by the trade; its likes had never been seen and the debate was on as to who had the best end of the deal. A large group of irate Richmond supporters vented their emotion in an angry scene at the club's AGM. As one of the most popular players at Punt Road, Barrot was still performing on-field and he admitted to heartbreak when told that he had effectively been sacked. Barrot was the younger man and it was felt that St Kilda had pulled a great con trick on the Tigers. It took just a few weeks of the new season to prove this view wrong.

== Rebirth in yellow and black ==
Wearing the Number 2 jumper in which Roy Wright won two Brownlow medals, Stewart burned from the start of 1971 and rapidly gained favouritism to win another Brownlow Medal. Meanwhile, Barrot lasted two games with the Saints, was dropped and then cleared to Carlton by mid-season. There, he played a handful of games for the Tigers' old rivals, but had a physical confrontation with coach Ron Barassi at half time in the last round of the season, which resulted in Barrot walking away from VFL football forever.

The 1971 Brownlow Medal count was one of the closest in VFL/AFL history. With one round of votes remaining, any of eight players could have won the medal; Stewart, Hawthorn's star full-forward Peter Hudson, St Kilda's John McIntosh and Essendon captain Barry Davis were tied on 18 votes, while Fitzroy's Alex Ruscuklic, Footscray's Gary Dempsey, Geelong's Bill Ryan and St Kilda captain Ross Smith were also in contention with 16 votes each. But, with the final vote of the evening, VFL administrative director Eric McCutchan announced that Stewart had polled three votes to win the medal outright. This made him the fourth player to win three Brownlow medals, and the first player to win the award at two clubs. If Stewart had not been awarded any votes in the final round of the home-and-away season, he and Barry Davis would have tied for the Brownlow, as both had received five best-on-ground votes from the umpires.

He starred in Richmond's semi-final victory over Collingwood, which set up a tantalising clash with St Kilda in the preliminary final, with Richmond hot favourite to win and advance to the Grand Final. On a very wet day, the Saints gained some vengeance for the deal by keeping Stewart relatively quiet and winning the game by five goals.

Stewart was hampered by injury during the 1972 finals, and was not fully fit for the Grand Final against Carlton. The Tigers selected him on the bench, but when he came on at half time, the game was effectively lost as Richmond trailed by 45 points. He picked up nine kicks in the second half as his team struggled in vain to bridge the gap. Better fortune attended the 1973 finals campaign. Again playing with injury, Stewart was a stand out in the three finals. But it was his performance in the Grand Final rematch with Carlton that underlined his courage and class. In the third quarter, Stewart suffered a leg injury which severely impacted his mobility, but because the interchange rule had not yet been introduced, he was moved to a forward pocket. From there, he kicked two goals to keep Richmond on track for their eighth premiership. He finished the game as one of Richmond's best, with 18 disposals, five marks and three goals. To date, Stewart is the only VFL/AFL footballer to have won a Brownlow medal and a premiership at two different clubs.

The following season, however, Stewart twice announced his retirement from the game. The first time was on the Thursday before the opening match of the season, but he quickly changed his mind after watching Richmond lose to Hawthorn. He rejoined the club in time to play in the centre for their Round 2 match against Fitzroy. After playing six more matches, including the infamous "Battle of Windy Hill" against Essendon, in which he kicked five goals, and his 200th VFL match in Round 10 against South Melbourne, Stewart wrote a letter to Richmond secretary Alan Schwab, announcing his decision to retire permanently. In his letter, Stewart wrote that he had made the decision after long and deep consideration. He felt that he couldn't cope with the demands of the game any more, and didn't want to spoil the good reputation he had built while at Richmond. His decision came as a shock to club officials. The Tigers were powerful enough to go on to another premiership without him. Then Stewart decided to come back for 1975, but he managed only five games before injury again forced him to quit, aged 31.

== Football involvement off the field ==
Just months after his last game, Stewart took a punt by taking on the coaching job at the embattled wooden spooners, South Melbourne. He was lured to the job by ex-North Melbourne administrator, Ron Joseph, who was on a short-lived appointment at the club. The Swans were the worst performed team since the war, and their finances were beginning to spin out of control. Over two seasons, Stewart performed a minor miracle by hauling the team up to eighth in 1976 and then the following year the Swans made the finals for only the second time in 32 years. The thrilling campaign to make the 1977 finals was highlighted by a withering run in the last six weeks of the season and a bold stroke by Stewart. He switched Graham Teasdale (a forward struggling so badly that he was thinking about returning to a bush league) in to the ruck and Teasdale dominated to the extent that he won the Brownlow medal in a canter. The fairytale ended the next week when the Swans were crushed by Richmond in an elimination final. Surprisingly, Stewart now left the Lake Oval.

Carlton decided to replace their coach and wanted a big name to take over, so they immediately contacted Stewart. It was a fateful decision – Stewart's perfectionism did not always make him a great communicator and he fell out with a number of the Blues' key men. After a thrashing from Richmond in the opening round of 1978, matters went from bad to worse. Captain Robert Walls left for Fitzroy; his veteran teammate Peter Jones (who, like Stewart, had started his career with North Hobart) was relegated to the reserves; club favourite Adrian Gallagher was removed from his assistant coaching position. All three had crossed swords with the irascible coach.

Just a few weeks into the season, Stewart quit the club, citing a heart attack. Speculation was rife that he had actually suffered a nervous breakdown, a view that was supported by the fact that he had been charged by the police (under the name of Ian Cervi) for exposing himself to daytime shoppers in Glen Huntly Road, Elsternwick, when parked opposite the Elsternwick Post Office, but it is certain that he quit before he was sacked. Certainly, Stewart was fit enough to resume as South Melbourne coach in 1979. He could not modify his hard-driving style and the personality clashes continued, but overall he got the best out of the limited material available at South Melbourne.

In reality, Stewart's three-year stint with the Swans developed into a holding pattern for the team as the club flirted with, then agreed to, a move to Sydney. With the threat of liquidation constantly hovering over performances, Stewart got the club to a creditable sixth in 1980, but overall they lost more than they won in this period. Stewart's role as coach in 1981 was made all the more difficult when he had his driver's licence cancelled for two years, when he was found guilty of having driven dangerously, and having failed to stop after an accident. Stewart continued to give opportunities to young players and publicly backed the relocation, then handed the a player list in reasonable shape for the move, at the end of the 1981 season.

After departing South Melbourne, Stewart returned to serve as general manager at St Kilda. In 1983 he was involved in a controversial clearance wrangle when South Melbourne players Paul Morwood and Silvio Foschini crossed to the Saints without clearance from the VFL. In Round 4, Morwood played in the game against Geelong without official clearance from the VFL. The Saints ended up losing by 11 points, but had they won, they would have risked forfeiting the premiership points under the League rules at the time. Stewart defended the players' freedom to play where they wished provided they were not under contract, and when asked about the risk of forfeiting premiership points, he retorted, "We were beaten by 21 goals last week, where was the risk?"

== Life outside football ==
After serving as general manager at St Kilda for three years during the tumultuous 1980s, Stewart cut ties with football and became involved with various business ventures, including uranium mining in the Kalahari Desert. But when the Saints' fortunes improved during the 2000s, he eventually returned to the club, even flying back to Melbourne from a business trip to watch the 2010 AFL Grand Final replay.

On 31 August 2006, tragedy struck the Stewart family when 25-year-old daughter Amy died from injuries sustained when her car hit a tree in country Victoria.

In July 2012, Stewart was admitted to the Royal Melbourne Hospital after suffering what he initially thought was a stroke, but was later diagnosed as Guillain–Barré syndrome. He was home alone at the time – his wife Suzie was in London visiting their other daughter Lauren – and had just returned from the gymnasium when he fell over in his bathroom. He had not experienced any symptoms. Paralysed from the neck down, he struggled to call for an ambulance using his nose. Stewart is not the first Australian footballer to have suffered from Guillain–Barré syndrome; former Collingwood wingman Graham Wright was diagnosed with the condition in 1993 and took three months to recover. When Hawthorn coach Alastair Clarkson was diagnosed with the condition in May 2014, Stewart, who was still attending three rehabilitation sessions a week, said that he doubted Clarkson would coach again during the season.

In July 2014, it was reported that Stewart, who had settled in Woodend, had donated some of his football memorabilia to raise funds for local charity Artists for Orphans.

== Honours and tributes ==
Stewart's sporting achievements have been recognised with numerous honours. Besides his three Brownlow Medals, Stewart was inducted into the Sport Australia Hall of Fame in 1986. He was also inducted into the Tasmanian Sporting Hall of Fame in 1993, and in 1996 was one of the first inductees into the Australian Football Hall of Fame before being elevated to Legend status the following year. In 2000, he received an Australian Sports Medal.

== See also ==
- List of Brownlow Medal winners
- Australian Football Hall of Fame
