= Ray Boyanich =

Australian rules footballer

Personal information
- Full name: Ray Boyanich
- Born: 4 February 1947 (age 79)
- Height: 193 cm (6 ft 4 in)
- Weight: 92 kg (203 lb)
- Position: Ruckman

Playing career^{1}
Years	Club	Games (Goals)
1970–72, 1976	Richmond	66 (44)
1973-1975	Woodville	22 (32)
1977-1981	West Perth	108 (93)
Total		196 (169)
- ^{1} Playing statistics correct to the end of 1976.

Ray Boyanich (born 4 February 1947) is a former Australian rules footballer who played with Richmond in the Victorian Football League (VFL) during the 1970s.

Boyanich started out at Hawthorn, after being recruited from Western Australia, but when he could not break into the seniors he was picked up by Richmond. Although primarily a ruckman, he played out of the back pocket in their losing 1972 VFL Grand Final team. He played at SANFL club Woodville from 1973 to 1975 without success before returning for one final season with Richmond.
