= Wayne Walsh =

Australian rules footballer

Personal information
- Born: 7 May 1946 (age 80)
- Original team: Murrumbeena
- Height: 178 cm (5 ft 10 in)
- Weight: 76 kg (168 lb)

Playing career^{1}
Years	Club	Games (Goals)
1968	Richmond	6 (0)
1969–1971	South Melbourne	63 (5)
1972–1978	Richmond	82 (30)
Total		151 (35)
- ^{1} Playing statistics correct to the end of 1978.

Career highlights
- Richmond Premiership Player 1973, 1974; Richmond Reserves Premiership Player 1966, 1977; Richmond Under 19s Premiership Coach 1980; Richmond Hall of Fame – inducted 2013; Interstate Games:- 2

Wayne Walsh (born 7 May 1946) is a former Australian rules football player who played in the VFL in 1968, then between 1972 and 1975 and again from 1977 to 1978 for the Richmond Football Club and also between 1969 and 1971 for the South Melbourne Football Club.
