= Kevin Hall (footballer) =

Australian rules footballer

Personal information
- Born: 21 May 1944 (age 82)
- Original team: West Preston YCW
- Debut: Round 12, 1963, Carlton vs. Fitzroy, at Princes Park
- Height: 191 cm (6 ft 3 in)
- Weight: 83 kg (183 lb)

Playing career^{1}
Years	Club	Games (Goals)
1963–1973	Carlton	169 (51)
- ^{1} Playing statistics correct to the end of 1973.

Kevin Hall (born 21 May 1944) is a former Australian rules footballer who played for Carlton in the VFL.

Making his debut in 1963, Hall played mostly as a defender and was at a half back flank in Carlton's 1968 premiership side. He was a premiership player with Carlton again in 1970 and 1972, playing as a fullback and ruck-rover respectively. His last game in the VFL was in the 1973 Grand Final which they lost to Richmond and five years later he was appointed to Carlton's match committee, later joining the board of directors.
