= Trevor Keogh =

Australian rules footballer

Personal information
- Born: 26 July 1949 (age 77)
- Original team: Sandhurst (BFL)
- Height: 175 cm (5 ft 9 in)
- Weight: 71 kg (157 lb)

Playing career^{1}
| Years | Club | Games (Goals) |
| 1970–1981 | Carlton | 208 (191) |
- ^{1} Playing statistics correct to the end of 1981.

Career highlights
- 1972 Perc Bentley Trophy -3rd Best & Fairest; 1973 9th Best & Fairest; 1974 Perc Bentley Trophy -3rd Best & Fairest; 1976 Robert Reynolds Memorial Trophy -Best & Fairest Award; 1978 Robert Reynolds Memorial Trophy -Best & Fairest Award; 1979 B. J. Deacon Memorial Trophy -Best Clubman Award; 1981 Reserves Best & Fairest Award; 1981 Carlton Supporters Reserves Best & Fairest Award

Trevor Keogh (born 26 July 1949) is a former Australian rules footballer who played for Carlton in the Victorian Football League.

Keogh was recruited from Sandhurst in the Bendigo Football League and made his debut for Carlton in 1970. A rover, he has been described as "instrumental" in Carlton's premiership wins of 1972 and 1979. He won the club's Best and Fairest award in 1976 and 1978, also representing Victoria in the interstate competition in the same years. He averaged almost a goal a game in his long career, and was a member of Carlton's famous so-called "mosquito fleet" of small players who played a key role in Carlton's two premiership wins from 1972 to 1979.

Keogh retired from senior football in 1981, later coaching the Blues' under-19 team and becoming a runner for the senior team.

Keogh was named on the bench in Carlton's Team of the Century.
