= Bryan Quirk =

Australian rules footballer and coach

Personal information
- Born: 26 December 1946 (age 79)
- Original team: Morwell (LVFL)
- Debut: Round 3, 1965, Carlton vs. South Melbourne, at Lake Oval
- Height: 185 cm (6 ft 1 in)
- Weight: 76 kg (168 lb)

Playing career^{1}
Years	Club	Games (Goals)
1965–1975	Carlton	167 (113)
- ^{1} Playing statistics correct to the end of 1975.

Career highlights
- 1968 Australian Football World Tour; 1968 premiership; Carlton Leading Goalkicker 1965

Bryan Quirk (born 26 December 1946) is a former Australian rules footballer in the Victorian Football League. He was recruited from Morwell Football Club in the then Latrobe Valley Football League. He was Collingwood fan as a child.

Quirk made his debut for the Carlton Football Club in Round 3, 1965. He kicked 3 goals on debut as a forward pocket. Quirk retired in 1975, at the age of 29, after eleven years with the club.

After his retirement from playing, he spent many years as a coach. He coached Maryborough in 1976 and 1977.

He returned to Carlton in 1978 and coached its Under-19s to back-to-back premierships in 1978 and 1979 (assisted by Brian Buckley), and later coached the Carlton reserves for three seasons.

He coached Victorian Football Association club Oakleigh Football Club from 1987 until 1989, leading the club to the 1988 Division 2 premiership, and returned to the club in 1992 following the mid-year retirement of Russell Rowe.

Quirk was recently added to a stamp released by Australia Post celebrating premiership players.

Quirk taught grade 5 at Kensington Primary School in 1967.

Quirk used to teach sport at Berwick Fields Primary School.
