= Craig McKellar =

Australian rules footballer

Personal information
- Born: 8 December 1949 (age 76)
- Original team: Woodville (SANFL)
- Height: 196 cm (6 ft 5 in)
- Weight: 93 kg (205 lb)

Playing career^{1}
Years	Club	Games (Goals)
1971–1975	Richmond	96 (25)
1976–1978	Melbourne	39 (19)
Total		135 (44)
- ^{1} Playing statistics correct to the end of 1978.

Craig McKellar (born 8 December 1949) is a former Australian rules footballer who played with Richmond and Melbourne in the Victorian Football League (VFL) during the 1970s.

A knock ruckman, McKellar was recruited to Richmond from Woodville and represented South Australia at the 1969 Adelaide Carnival. After making his debut for Richmond in 1971 he played in a losing Grand Final team in 1972 and their premiership team in 1973. He continued to play with Richmond until 1975 when, after being omitted from their finals side, he announced his retirement.

Melbourne, however, convinced McKellar to continue and he spent three seasons with the Demons. Although he never won Richmond's best and fairest award, he was their top Brownlow Medal vote getter in both the 1972 and 1975 counts. He also played interstate football for Victoria.
