= Barry Armstrong =

Australian rules footballer

Personal information
- Born: 22 September 1950 (age 76)
- Original team: Bundoora
- Height: 181 cm (5 ft 11 in)
- Weight: 82 kg (181 lb)

Playing career^{1}
| Years | Club | Games (Goals) |
| 1969–1981 | Carlton | 204 (142) |
- ^{1} Playing statistics correct to the end of 1981.

Career highlights
- 2x VFL premiership player: 1972, 1979; 2nd in Carlton's Best and Fairest count 1974, 1977

Barry Armstrong (born 22 September 1950) is a former Australian rules footballer who played with Carlton in the VFL during the 1970s.

Armstrong was a versatile player, used most often as a centreman and ruck rover. Twice a premiership player with Carlton, he is a member of the Carlton Hall of Fame.
