= Graeme Richmond =

Australian sports administrator

Greame Richmond
- Born: 27 January 1934
- Died: 15 September 1991 (aged 57)
- Occupation: Sporting administrator

Graeme Richmond (27 January 1934 – 15 September 1991) was a long time administrator of the Richmond Football Club.

Recruited from Geelong College, he played mainly as a defender in Richmond's Thirds from 1951 to 1953. He captained this side and won its Best & Fairest in 1952. He also played 13 games for the Richmond Seconds side in 1952 and 1953. His playing career ended with a serious knee injury but he went on to coach the Richmond Under 17s in 1960 and Under 19s in 1961 and 1962.

He served as club secretary from 1962 until 1968, then as club treasurer from 1968 to 1969. He was a member of the Richmond Football Club Committee from 1970 through to 1986 and was vice-president from 1979 until 1983. He was suspended for the rest of the season in 1974 for his involvement in an infamous bench-clearing brawl at Windy Hill in Round 7.

Graeme Richmond was made a life member of the Richmond Football Club in 1967, was a life member of the Victorian Football League and was awarded the VFL's Jack Titus Service Award in 1983.

He was the publican of the George Hotel in St Kilda, and in 1978 agreed to convert its ballroom into a punk rock venue. Named the Crystal Ballroom, it became a launching pad for local bands, including The Birthday Party, Models and Hunters and Collectors, and also hosted many international bands.

He died of cancer in 1991 and was posthumously inducted into the club's Hall of Fame in its inaugural year, 2002.

During the Tigers Centenary year, Graeme was awarded "Servant of the Century" in 100 Tiger Treasures.
