= Geoff Southby =

Australian rules footballer

Personal information
- Full name: Geoff Southby
- Born: 27 October 1950 (age 76)
- Original team: Sandhurst
- Height: 188 cm (6 ft 2 in)
- Weight: 87 kg (192 lb)

Playing career^{1}
Years	Club	Games (Goals)
1971–1984	Carlton	268 (31)
- ^{1} Playing statistics correct to the end of 1984.

Career highlights
- Carlton best and fairest 1971, 1972; Carlton premierships 1972, 1979; All-Australian 1980; Carlton Team of the Century; Victorian representative (16 games, 0 goals)

Geoff Southby (born 27 October 1950) is a former Australian rules footballer in the (then) Victorian Football League (VFL).

An attacking full-back who ran hard from defence and stopped the best full-forwards, Southby was a key contributor to Carlton Football Club's success in the 1970s.

In 2000, Southby was inducted into the Australian Football Hall of Fame. Southby was also inducted into the Carlton Football Club Hall of Fame, and he was elevated to Legend status in 2013. He his considered one of the best full-backs in VFL/AFL history.
