= Vin Waite =

Australian rules footballer

Personal information
- Born: 26 February 1949
- Died: 5 July 2003 (aged 54)
- Original team: Morwell
- Debut: Round 5, 1966, Carlton vs. Melbourne, at the MCG
- Height: 192 cm (6 ft 4 in)
- Weight: 96 kg (212 lb)

Playing career^{1}
Years	Club	Games (Goals)
1966–1975	Carlton	153 (33)
- ^{1} Playing statistics correct to the end of 1975.

Career highlights
- Carlton premiership player: 1970 & 1972

Vincent Waite (26 February 1949 – 5 July 2003) was an Australian rules footballer who played for Carlton in the VFL. His son Jarrad followed in his footsteps and started his football career with Carlton, being drafted under the father–son rule.

Recruited as a seventeen year old, from the Latrobe Valley town of Morwell, Waite kicked two goals with his first two kicks in league football. Later he was moved back as a defender to exploit his booming left foot kick. Vin Waite was a premiership player with Carlton in 1970 and 1972 as well as playing in two losing Grand Finals. He represented the Victorian interstate team in 1971.

Early in 1974, persistent calf and lower back strains began to plague him. forcing him to retire from league football after the 1975 season.

He headed to Tasmania where he captain-coach Tasmanian club Latrobe for a four-year contract. He cut his contract short by crossing over to East Devonport for four seasons.

He finished his career by being playing coach of Churchill in 1985. In the early 80s, Vin and his family moved back to suburban Melbourne.

In 2003 he suffered a heart attack and died at the age of 54.
