= Barry Richardson (Australian footballer) =

Australian rules footballer, born 1946

Personal information
- Born: 22 January 1946 (age 80); Albury, New South Wales
- Original team: St. Patrick's College, Ballarat
- Debut: 1965, Richmond vs. Melbourne
- Height: 191 cm (6 ft 3 in)
- Weight: 82.5 kg (182 lb)

Playing career^{1}
Years	Club	Games (Goals)
1965–1974	Richmond	125 (134)

Coaching career
Years	Club	Games (W–L–D)
1977–1978	Richmond	47 (25–20–2)
- ^{1} Playing statistics correct to the end of 1978.

Career highlights
- Richmond Premiership Player – 1967, 1969, 1974; Richmond Hall of Fame – Inducted 2003

Barry Richardson (born 22 January 1946 in Albury, New South Wales) is a former Australian rules football player who played in the VFL between 1965 and 1974 for the Richmond Football Club.

A qualified physiotherapist, he also coached Richmond in 1977 and 1978, and served as Club President in 1985.
