= 1972 VFL season =

76th season of the Victorian Football League (VFL)

1972 VFL premiership season
- Teams: 12
- Premiers: Carlton; 11th premiership
- Minor premiers: Carlton; 12th minor premiership
- Brownlow Medallist: Len Thompson (Collingwood)
- Coleman Medallist: Peter McKenna (Collingwood)

Attendance
- Matches played: 139
- Total attendance: 3,526,848 (25,373 per match)
- Highest: 112,393

The 1972 VFL season was the 76th season of the Victorian Football League (VFL), the highest level senior Australian rules football competition in Victoria. The season featured twelve clubs, ran from 1 April until 7 October, and comprised a 22-game home-and-away season followed by a finals series featuring the top five clubs – an increase from the four clubs which had contested the finals in previous years.

The premiership was won by the Carlton Football Club for the eleventh time, after it defeated Richmond by 27 points in the 1972 VFL Grand Final.

== Background ==
In 1972, the VFL competition consisted of twelve teams of 18 on-the-field players each, plus two substitute players, known as the 19th man and the 20th man. A player could be substituted for any reason; however, once substituted, a player could not return to the field of play under any circumstances.

Teams played each other in a home-and-away season of 22 rounds; matches 12 to 22 were the "home-and-way reverse" of matches 1 to 11.

Once the 22 round home-and-away season had finished, the 1972 VFL Premiers were determined by the specific format and conventions of the McIntyre final five system.

== Home-and-away season ==
=== Round 1 ===
Home team	Home team score	Away team	Away team score	Venue	Crowd	Date
Hawthorn	15.14 (104)	Melbourne	10.15 (75)	Glenferrie Oval	26,000	1 April 1972
Carlton	11.15 (81)	Fitzroy	10.10 (70)	Princes Park	32,500	1 April 1972
St Kilda	20.14 (134)	North Melbourne	11.10 (76)	Moorabbin Oval	24,000	1 April 1972
South Melbourne	10.13 (73)	Geelong	9.7 (61)	Lake Oval	18,654	3 April 1972
Footscray	9.13 (67)	Essendon	18.20 (128)	Western Oval	28,935	3 April 1972
Richmond	16.9 (105)	Collingwood	14.17 (101)	MCG	72,714	3 April 1972

=== Round 2 ===
Home team	Home team score	Away team	Away team score	Venue	Crowd	Date
Geelong	10.3 (63)	Richmond	22.17 (149)	Kardinia Park	18,494	8 April 1972
Fitzroy	12.16 (88)	St Kilda	12.8 (80)	Junction Oval	20,000	8 April 1972
Essendon	16.11 (107)	South Melbourne	7.18 (60)	Windy Hill	22,611	8 April 1972
North Melbourne	11.10 (76)	Hawthorn	19.24 (138)	Arden Street Oval	10,200	8 April 1972
Melbourne	11.18 (84)	Footscray	15.15 (105)	MCG	21,452	8 April 1972
Collingwood	10.15 (75)	Carlton	11.9 (75)	Victoria Park	37,070	8 April 1972

=== Round 3 ===
Home team	Home team score	Away team	Away team score	Venue	Crowd	Date
Collingwood	17.11 (113)	Melbourne	6.12 (48)	Victoria Park	25,172	15 April 1972
St Kilda	22.7 (139)	Footscray	12.9 (81)	Moorabbin Oval	20,068	15 April 1972
North Melbourne	12.14 (86)	Fitzroy	16.13 (109)	Arden Street Oval	10,383	15 April 1972
Richmond	16.15 (111)	Essendon	19.17 (131)	MCG	55,823	15 April 1972
South Melbourne	14.10 (94)	Carlton	18.18 (126)	Lake Oval	20,499	15 April 1972
Geelong	9.11 (65)	Hawthorn	15.17 (107)	VFL Park	16,347	15 April 1972

=== Round 4 ===
Home team	Home team score	Away team	Away team score	Venue	Crowd	Date
Melbourne	18.19 (127)	South Melbourne	8.8 (56)	MCG	18,594	22 April 1972
Footscray	15.10 (100)	North Melbourne	12.14 (86)	Western Oval	12,827	22 April 1972
Fitzroy	11.17 (83)	Hawthorn	9.10 (64)	Junction Oval	16,937	22 April 1972
Essendon	17.27 (129)	Geelong	12.14 (86)	Windy Hill	15,000	22 April 1972
Carlton	15.14 (104)	Richmond	15.19 (109)	Princes Park	28,536	22 April 1972
Collingwood	9.13 (67)	St Kilda	12.15 (87)	VFL Park	40,201	22 April 1972

=== Round 5 ===
Home team	Home team score	Away team	Away team score	Venue	Crowd	Date
Richmond	13.11 (89)	Melbourne	12.12 (84)	MCG	38,154	25 April 1972
Essendon	10.13 (73)	Carlton	13.10 (88)	VFL Park	50,502	25 April 1972
South Melbourne	5.17 (47)	St Kilda	9.16 (70)	Lake Oval	19,724	29 April 1972
Hawthorn	14.20 (104)	Footscray	11.10 (76)	Glenferrie Oval	15,355	29 April 1972
Geelong	11.9 (75)	Fitzroy	19.13 (127)	Kardinia Park	16,343	29 April 1972
North Melbourne	8.14 (62)	Collingwood	22.8 (140)	Arden Street Oval	17,414	29 April 1972

=== Round 6 ===
Home team	Home team score	Away team	Away team score	Venue	Crowd	Date
Collingwood	14.12 (96)	Hawthorn	15.11 (101)	Victoria Park	29,885	6 May 1972
Carlton	22.15 (147)	Geelong	14.14 (98)	Princes Park	19,073	6 May 1972
St Kilda	24.21 (165)	Richmond	10.16 (76)	Moorabbin Oval	34,055	6 May 1972
Footscray	16.16 (112)	Fitzroy	13.12 (90)	Western Oval	18,466	6 May 1972
Melbourne	16.13 (109)	Essendon	12.13 (85)	MCG	41,537	6 May 1972
South Melbourne	14.22 (106)	North Melbourne	13.13 (91)	VFL Park	9,099	6 May 1972

=== Round 7 ===
Home team	Home team score	Away team	Away team score	Venue	Crowd	Date
Hawthorn	13.14 (92)	South Melbourne	9.20 (74)	Glenferrie Oval	13,742	13 May 1972
Essendon	18.15 (123)	St Kilda	10.22 (82)	Windy Hill	27,875	13 May 1972
Richmond	17.19 (121)	North Melbourne	13.16 (94)	MCG	17,331	13 May 1972
Geelong	15.18 (108)	Footscray	16.15 (111)	Kardinia Park	16,836	13 May 1972
Fitzroy	10.15 (75)	Collingwood	15.10 (100)	Junction Oval	26,766	13 May 1972
Carlton	10.15 (75)	Melbourne	5.8 (38)	VFL Park	30,249	13 May 1972

=== Round 8 ===
Home team	Home team score	Away team	Away team score	Venue	Crowd	Date
Collingwood	7.14 (56)	Footscray	11.14 (80)	Victoria Park	25,986	20 May 1972
Melbourne	20.14 (134)	Geelong	14.17 (101)	MCG	19,023	20 May 1972
South Melbourne	9.7 (61)	Fitzroy	18.11 (119)	Lake Oval	12,421	20 May 1972
North Melbourne	8.13 (61)	Essendon	14.12 (96)	Arden Street Oval	14,091	20 May 1972
St Kilda	10.12 (72)	Carlton	14.15 (99)	Moorabbin Oval	31,547	20 May 1972
Richmond	11.25 (91)	Hawthorn	13.6 (84)	VFL Park	25,845	20 May 1972

=== Round 9 ===
Home team	Home team score	Away team	Away team score	Venue	Crowd	Date
Footscray	12.9 (81)	South Melbourne	9.10 (64)	Western Oval	15,891	27 May 1972
Fitzroy	12.25 (97)	Richmond	16.9 (105)	Junction Oval	21,753	27 May 1972
Essendon	15.17 (107)	Hawthorn	14.21 (105)	Windy Hill	28,187	27 May 1972
Collingwood	28.16 (184)	Geelong	16.13 (109)	Victoria Park	20,771	27 May 1972
Carlton	16.13 (109)	North Melbourne	6.11 (47)	Princes Park	15,664	27 May 1972
Melbourne	5.6 (36)	St Kilda	9.19 (73)	VFL Park	23,507	27 May 1972

=== Round 10 ===
Home team	Home team score	Away team	Away team score	Venue	Crowd	Date
Geelong	9.11 (65)	St Kilda	11.15 (81)	Kardinia Park	15,835	3 June 1972
North Melbourne	6.11 (47)	Melbourne	23.17 (155)	Arden Street Oval	8,063	3 June 1972
Richmond	15.14 (104)	Footscray	12.14 (86)	MCG	36,985	3 June 1972
South Melbourne	8.11 (59)	Collingwood	19.14 (128)	Lake Oval	18,085	3 June 1972
Hawthorn	11.22 (88)	Carlton	13.7 (85)	Glenferrie Oval	26,665	3 June 1972
Essendon	14.17 (101)	Fitzroy	15.9 (99)	VFL Park	26,790	3 June 1972

=== Round 11 ===
Home team	Home team score	Away team	Away team score	Venue	Crowd	Date
Richmond	14.11 (95)	South Melbourne	2.19 (31)	MCG	18,692	10 June 1972
St Kilda	17.8 (110)	Hawthorn	7.14 (56)	Moorabbin Oval	24,000	10 June 1972
Footscray	7.9 (51)	Carlton	7.15 (57)	Western Oval	23,948	10 June 1972
Fitzroy	12.17 (89)	Melbourne	13.10 (88)	Junction Oval	23,103	12 June 1972
Collingwood	23.10 (148)	Essendon	13.15 (93)	Victoria Park	42,206	12 June 1972
North Melbourne	14.11 (95)	Geelong	14.20 (104)	VFL Park	13,945	12 June 1972

=== Round 12 ===
Home team	Home team score	Away team	Away team score	Venue	Crowd	Date
North Melbourne	7.8 (50)	St Kilda	12.19 (91)	Arden Street Oval	10,681	17 June 1972
Collingwood	11.24 (90)	Richmond	12.13 (85)	Victoria Park	28,188	17 June 1972
Melbourne	11.10 (76)	Hawthorn	11.9 (75)	MCG	31,314	17 June 1972
Geelong	15.14 (104)	South Melbourne	10.13 (73)	Kardinia Park	14,426	24 June 1972
Essendon	14.15 (99)	Footscray	19.19 (133)	Windy Hill	23,903	24 June 1972
Fitzroy	8.7 (55)	Carlton	13.13 (91)	VFL Park	29,380	24 June 1972

=== Round 13 ===
Home team	Home team score	Away team	Away team score	Venue	Crowd	Date
Hawthorn	21.14 (140)	North Melbourne	10.16 (76)	Glenferrie Oval	8,201	1 July 1972
Carlton	10.10 (70)	Collingwood	9.8 (62)	Princes Park	36,133	1 July 1972
Richmond	14.8 (92)	Geelong	25.18 (168)	MCG	22,595	1 July 1972
St Kilda	13.10 (88)	Fitzroy	6.17 (53)	Moorabbin Oval	18,355	1 July 1972
South Melbourne	12.12 (84)	Essendon	13.9 (87)	Lake Oval	12,984	1 July 1972
Footscray	11.8 (74)	Melbourne	16.15 (111)	VFL Park	14,180	1 July 1972

=== Round 14 ===
Home team	Home team score	Away team	Away team score	Venue	Crowd	Date
South Melbourne	10.9 (69)	Melbourne	14.9 (93)	Lake Oval	10,405	8 July 1972
North Melbourne	8.15 (63)	Footscray	14.15 (99)	Arden Street Oval	9,302	8 July 1972
Geelong	10.10 (70)	Essendon	9.6 (60)	Kardinia Park	23,873	8 July 1972
St Kilda	4.13 (37)	Collingwood	9.13 (67)	Moorabbin Oval	30,451	8 July 1972
Richmond	17.17 (119)	Carlton	13.10 (88)	MCG	46,471	8 July 1972
Hawthorn	19.19 (133)	Fitzroy	12.8 (80)	VFL Park	12,425	8 July 1972

=== Round 15 ===
Home team	Home team score	Away team	Away team score	Venue	Crowd	Date
Footscray	14.7 (91)	St Kilda	9.11 (65)	Western Oval	18,655	15 July 1972
Fitzroy	16.14 (110)	North Melbourne	9.12 (66)	Junction Oval	7,007	15 July 1972
Essendon	13.12 (90)	Richmond	17.9 (111)	Windy Hill	22,251	15 July 1972
Carlton	20.8 (128)	South Melbourne	8.15 (63)	Princes Park	14,465	15 July 1972
Hawthorn	19.14 (128)	Geelong	15.8 (98)	Glenferrie Oval	12,425	15 July 1972
Melbourne	8.10 (58)	Collingwood	10.13 (73)	VFL Park	30,883	15 July 1972

=== Round 16 ===
Home team	Home team score	Away team	Away team score	Venue	Crowd	Date
Melbourne	11.18 (84)	Richmond	19.9 (123)	MCG	32,416	22 July 1972
Footscray	13.11 (89)	Hawthorn	19.16 (130)	Western Oval	18,400	22 July 1972
Fitzroy	10.9 (69)	Geelong	12.13 (85)	Junction Oval	11,046	22 July 1972
Collingwood	17.6 (108)	North Melbourne	11.14 (80)	Victoria Park	18,049	22 July 1972
Carlton	20.13 (133)	Essendon	17.15 (117)	Princes Park	26,206	22 July 1972
St Kilda	14.11 (95)	South Melbourne	9.5 (59)	VFL Park	13,184	22 July 1972

=== Round 17 ===
Home team	Home team score	Away team	Away team score	Venue	Crowd	Date
Richmond	23.15 (153)	St Kilda	11.15 (81)	MCG	44,348	29 July 1972
North Melbourne	12.15 (87)	South Melbourne	11.12 (78)	Arden Street Oval	6,191	29 July 1972
Essendon	21.14 (140)	Melbourne	14.11 (95)	Windy Hill	16,318	29 July 1972
Hawthorn	11.16 (82)	Collingwood	19.13 (127)	Glenferrie Oval	24,135	29 July 1972
Geelong	9.13 (67)	Carlton	17.17 (119)	Kardinia Park	24,797	29 July 1972
Fitzroy	15.12 (102)	Footscray	11.15 (81)	VFL Park	9,750	29 July 1972

=== Round 18 ===
Home team	Home team score	Away team	Away team score	Venue	Crowd	Date
Footscray	9.19 (73)	Geelong	10.9 (69)	Western Oval	14,699	5 August 1972
Collingwood	19.15 (129)	Fitzroy	12.13 (85)	Victoria Park	25,007	5 August 1972
South Melbourne	13.11 (89)	Hawthorn	23.10 (148)	Lake Oval	9,207	5 August 1972
St Kilda	12.9 (81)	Essendon	12.16 (88)	Moorabbin Oval	29,062	5 August 1972
Melbourne	8.18 (66)	Carlton	11.11 (77)	MCG	33,364	5 August 1972
North Melbourne	6.14 (50)	Richmond	13.20 (98)	VFL Park	11,393	5 August 1972

=== Round 19 ===
Home team	Home team score	Away team	Away team score	Venue	Crowd	Date
Hawthorn	15.12 (102)	Richmond	17.11 (113)	Glenferrie Oval	18,103	12 August 1972
Geelong	11.19 (85)	Melbourne	21.16 (142)	Kardinia Park	12,716	12 August 1972
Fitzroy	14.14 (98)	South Melbourne	6.17 (53)	Junction Oval	7,451	12 August 1972
Essendon	21.14 (140)	North Melbourne	14.11 (95)	Windy Hill	14,454	12 August 1972
Carlton	13.16 (94)	St Kilda	10.11 (71)	Princes Park	22,109	12 August 1972
Footscray	7.13 (55)	Collingwood	15.12 (102)	VFL Park	21,540	12 August 1972

=== Round 20 ===
Home team	Home team score	Away team	Away team score	Venue	Crowd	Date
St Kilda	13.12 (90)	Melbourne	13.11 (89)	Moorabbin Oval	18,836	19 August 1972
South Melbourne	9.12 (66)	Footscray	11.13 (79)	Lake Oval	9,154	19 August 1972
Richmond	20.17 (137)	Fitzroy	13.22 (100)	MCG	27,651	19 August 1972
Geelong	17.10 (112)	Collingwood	17.9 (111)	Kardinia Park	23,108	19 August 1972
North Melbourne	8.12 (60)	Carlton	23.11 (149)	Arden Street Oval	11,271	19 August 1972
Hawthorn	15.16 (106)	Essendon	12.15 (87)	VFL Park	36,749	19 August 1972

=== Round 21 ===
Home team	Home team score	Away team	Away team score	Venue	Crowd	Date
Melbourne	17.22 (124)	North Melbourne	14.7 (91)	MCG	11,241	26 August 1972
Footscray	17.21 (123)	Richmond	18.17 (125)	Western Oval	18,117	26 August 1972
Collingwood	22.17 (149)	South Melbourne	11.6 (72)	Victoria Park	19,934	26 August 1972
Carlton	24.12 (156)	Hawthorn	11.22 (88)	Princes Park	32,048	26 August 1972
Fitzroy	14.20 (104)	Essendon	18.11 (119)	Junction Oval	17,252	26 August 1972
St Kilda	11.10 (76)	Geelong	8.13 (61)	VFL Park	25,663	26 August 1972

=== Round 22 ===
Home team	Home team score	Away team	Away team score	Venue	Crowd	Date
Hawthorn	15.12 (102)	St Kilda	18.13 (121)	Glenferrie Oval	22,855	2 September 1972
Geelong	20.20 (140)	North Melbourne	13.11 (89)	Kardinia Park	12,267	2 September 1972
Carlton	13.8 (86)	Footscray	11.17 (83)	Princes Park	24,619	2 September 1972
Melbourne	18.19 (127)	Fitzroy	14.11 (95)	MCG	21,653	2 September 1972
Essendon	17.15 (117)	Collingwood	17.10 (112)	Windy Hill	35,030	2 September 1972
South Melbourne	12.10 (82)	Richmond	23.20 (158)	VFL Park	16,541	2 September 1972

== Ladder ==
(P)	Premiers
	Qualified for finals

#	Team	P	W	L	D	PF	PA	%	Pts
1	Carlton (P)	22	18	3	1	2237	1666	134.3	74
2	Richmond	22	18	4	0	2469	2098	117.7	72
3	Collingwood	22	14	7	1	2338	1747	133.8	58
4	St Kilda	22	14	8	0	1989	1721	115.6	56
5	Essendon	22	14	8	0	2317	2140	108.3	56
6	Hawthorn	22	13	9	0	2277	2050	111.1	52
7	Footscray	22	11	11	0	1930	2038	94.7	44
8	Melbourne	22	10	12	0	2043	1929	105.9	40
9	Fitzroy	22	9	13	0	1997	2062	96.8	36
10	Geelong	22	7	15	0	1994	2369	84.2	28
11	South Melbourne	22	2	20	0	1513	2323	65.1	8
12	North Melbourne	22	1	21	0	1628	2589	62.9	4

Rules for classification: 1. premiership points; 2. percentage; 3. points for
Average score: 93.7
Source: AFL Tables

== Finals series ==
Qualifying and elimination finals
9 Sep, MCG
2	Richmond	25.14 (164)
3	Collingwood	18.12 (120)
9 Sep, VFL Park
4	St Kilda	18.16 (124)
5	Essendon	10.11 (71)

Semi-finals
16 Sep, VFL Park/23 Sep, MCG
1	Carlton	8.13 (61)	9.15 (69)
Richmond	8.13 (61)	15.20 (110)
16 Sep, MCG
Collingwood	8.17 (65)
St Kilda	11.17 (83)

Preliminary final
30 Sep, MCG
Carlton	16.13 (109)
St Kilda	13.15 (93)

Grand final
7 Oct, MCG
Richmond	22.18 (150)
Carlton	28.9 (177)

=== Finals week 1 ===
Home team	Score	Away team	Score	Venue	Crowd	Date
St Kilda	18.16 (124)	Essendon	10.11 (71)	VFL Park	52,499	9 September
Richmond	25.14 (164)	Collingwood	18.12 (120)	MCG	91,900	9 September

=== Finals week 2 ===
Home team	Score	Away team	Score	Venue	Crowd	Date
Collingwood	8.17 (65)	St Kilda	11.17 (83)	MCG	91,857	16 September
Carlton	8.13 (61)	Richmond	8.13 (61)	VFL Park	54,338	16 September
Carlton	9.15 (69)	Richmond	15.20 (110)	MCG	92,670	23 September

=== Preliminary final ===
Home team	Score	Away team	Score	Venue	Crowd	Date
Carlton	16.13 (109)	St Kilda	13.15 (93)	MCG	96,272	30 September

== Season notes ==
- The Page–McIntyre system for determining the VFL premiership team, that had been centered on a final four, and had operated from 1931 to 1971, was replaced by the McIntyre final five system in 1972. This was done primarily to create new finals which could be played at the VFL-owned VFL Park while still fulfilling the existing finals contract at the Melbourne Cricket Ground. The new finals system was used from 1972 until 1990.
- In Round 1, Hawthorn full-forward Peter Hudson kicked 8 goals at Glenferrie Oval before he sustained a knee injury that kept him out until Round 21 of the following season.
- In Round 10, the VFL changed a tradition: the field umpire, rather than team captains, tossed the coin at the start of the match, in order to reduce gamesmanship.
- In Round 14, Collingwood half-forward John Greening was felled by St Kilda back-man Jim O'Dea 70 metres behind play. Greening was comatose for some time and was extremely lucky not to have died. After a VFL investigation, O'Dea received a 10-week suspension, which was seen by some as unsatisfactory.
- In the second quarter of Carlton's Round 16 match against Essendon, Alex Jesaulenko kicked six goals in eleven minutes. Carlton kicked 11 goals straight in that second quarter.
- In August, the VFL announced that it would grant a free transfer to any player who had played 10 years with a single club.
  - The "10-year rule" was introduced in order to render the VFL immune from the sorts of "restraint of trade" difficulties that were being experienced, at the time, in New South Wales in relation to Rugby League footballers.
  - Although twenty-two VFL players were eligible to do so, only six players, George Bisset (Footscray to Collingwood), Barry Davis (Essendon to North Melbourne), Carl Ditterich (St Kilda to Melbourne), Adrian Gallagher (Carlton to Footscray), John Rantall (South Melbourne to North Melbourne), and Doug Wade (Geelong to North Melbourne) took advantage of the new rule. The rule was rescinded in May 1973.
- In September, North Melbourne Football Club appointed Ron Barassi as its 1973 coach.
- In Round 20, Geelong's Ken Newland kicked a behind after the siren to win the match against Collingwood.
- In the Round 21 match between Fitzroy and Essendon at the Junction Oval, bespectacled Essendon full-forward Geoff Blethyn kicked his 100th goal. A mounted policeman galloped out to protect Blethyn from spectators, and Blethyn was temporarily rendered sightless when the policeman's horse slobbered all over his glasses.
- The 16 September First semi-final between Richmond and Carlton was tied at 8.13 (61) each. Angry fans invaded VFL Park immediately after the siren and field umpire Ian Coates was assaulted.
- The Grand Final between Carlton and Richmond featured an aggregate score of 50.27 (327), setting the record for the highest aggregate score in any game, final or otherwise. The previous record of 48.25 (313) had stood since 1942, and the record would last until 1978.

== Awards ==
- The 1972 VFL Premiership team was Carlton.
- The VFL's leading goalkicker was Peter McKenna of Collingwood who kicked 130 goals.
- The winner of the 1972 Brownlow Medal was Len Thompson of Collingwood with 25 votes.
- North Melbourne took the "wooden spoon" in 1972. The club would not "win" another wooden spoon again until 2021, forty-nine years later.
- The reserves premiership was won by Hawthorn. Hawthorn 13.10 (88) defeated Melbourne 12.12 (84) in the grand final, held as a curtain-raiser to the seniors Grand Final at the Melbourne Cricket Ground on 7 October.

== Sources ==
- 1972 VFL season at AFL Tables
- 1972 VFL season at Australian Football
