= List of VFL debuts in 1969 =

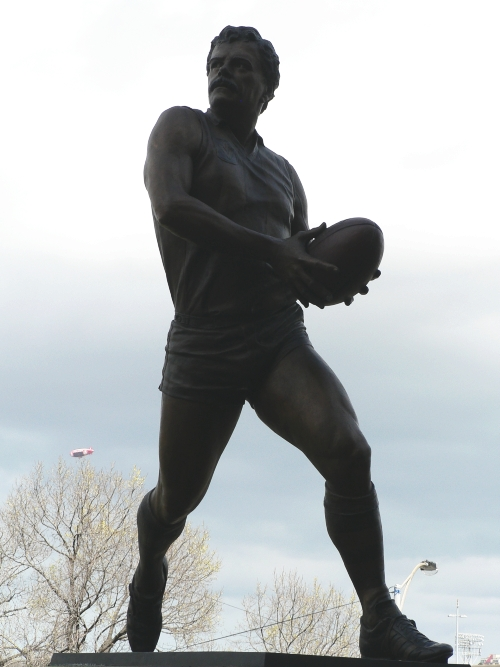
A statue of Leigh Matthews, who made his VFL debut in 1969

The 1969 Victorian Football League (VFL) season was the 73rd season of the VFL. The season saw 116 Australian rules footballers make their senior VFL debut and a further 7 players transfer to new clubs having previously played in the VFL.

== Summary ==
Summary of debuts in 1969
Club	VFL debuts	Change of club
Carlton	8	0
Collingwood	9	0
Essendon	10	0
Fitzroy	10	0
Footscray	13	1
Geelong	4	0
Hawthorn	8	0
Melbourne	14	1
North Melbourne	8	2
Richmond	11	0
South Melbourne	15	3
St Kilda	6	0
Total	116	7

== Debuts ==
Name	Club	Age at debut	Round debuted	Games	Goals	Notes
Bruce Doull	Carlton	18 years, 234 days	5	385	22	
David McKay	Carlton	19 years, 165 days	3	263	277	
Barry Armstrong	Carlton	18 years, 307 days	16	204	142	
Phillip Pinnell	Carlton	18 years, 137 days	8	173	5	
Syd Jackson	Carlton	24 years, 278 days	1	136	165	
Bert Thornley	Carlton	26 years, 228 days	3	24	3	
Doug Baird	Carlton	18 years, 212 days	10	6	8	
Noel Mewett	Carlton	20 years, 52 days	8	5	3	
Max Richardson	Collingwood	20 years, 135 days	5	211	158	Brother of Wayne Richardson.
Ronald Wearmouth	Collingwood	18 years, 360 days	14	186	127	
Robert Dean	Collingwood	18 years, 272 days	15	121	37	
Jeff Clifton	Collingwood	20 years, 92 days	8	102	0	
Doug Gott	Collingwood	19 years, 12 days	14	97	26	Played first-class cricket for Victoria.
Jeff Pitts	Collingwood	18 years, 281 days	3	4	1	
John Bell	Collingwood	19 years, 225 days	2	2	0	
Gordon Lawrie	Collingwood	18 years, 137 days	3	2	0	
Mark Slater	Collingwood	17 years, 338 days	10	2	0	
Neville Fields	Essendon	17 years, 240 days	15	140	138	
Wayne Headlam	Essendon	20 years, 181 days	11	60	25	
Stuart Barclay	Essendon	19 years, 211 days	5	38	3	
Doug Tassell	Essendon	23 years, 140 days	7	20	0	
David Collins	Essendon	22 years, 311 days	1	14	6	
Ian Stevenson	Essendon	24 years, 243 days	8	10	2	
Roger Hampson	Essendon	20 years, 197 days	9	10	1	
Gary Crouch	Essendon	22 years, 192 days	1	9	1	
John Sinclair	Essendon	20 years, 282 days	1	2	0	
John Carpenter	Essendon	20 years, 324 days	15	2	1	
Harvey Merrigan	Fitzroy	19 years, 157 days	6	197	18	
Leigh Robertson	Fitzroy	18 years, 347 days	5	76	14	
Shane Molloy	Fitzroy	19 years, 290 days	1	61	4	Father of Jarrod Molloy.
Bill Sykes	Fitzroy	20 years, 212 days	5	48	5	
Bob Hodgkin	Fitzroy	19 years, 276 days	9	24	0	
Paul Shanahan	Fitzroy	20 years, 260 days	13	21	27	
Bruce Baker	Fitzroy	19 years, 37 days	3	16	4	
Peter Ellis	Fitzroy	22 years, 74 days	7	7	0	
Robert Ireland	Fitzroy	22 years, 74 days	19	5	0	
Peter Weightman	Fitzroy	20 years, 53 days	10	1	1	
Stephen Power	Footscray	18 years, 229 days	1	177	25	
Bernie Quinlan	Footscray	17 years, 342 days	12	177	241	Won Brownlow Medal in 1981.
Barry Round	Footscray	19 years, 71 days	1	135	136	Won Brownlow Medal in 1981. Father of David Round.
Gordon Casey	Footscray	19 years, 25 days	3	125	5	Previously played for Carlton.
Robert McGhie	Footscray	17 years, 307 days	11	49	6	
Laurie Rippon	Footscray	18 years, 267 days	5	45	4	
Graeme Joslin	Footscray	18 years, 281 days	1	24	0	
Harry Skreja	Footscray	16 years, 93 days	7	18	13	
Norm Mitchell	Footscray	17 years, 237 days	1	5	1	
Richard Radziminski	Footscray	19 years, 284 days	6	14	0	
Bruce Davidson	Footscray	18 years, 286 days	1	3	0	
Geoff Thatcher	Footscray	18 years, 223 days	5	2	0	
Tad Joniec	Footscray	18 years, 246 days	20	2	1	
Bruce Greenhill	Footscray	22 years, 255 days	01	1	0	
David Harris	Geelong	22 years, 323 days	1	44	20	
Pat Patterson	Geelong	22 years, 199 days	9	8	0	
Jeff Bates	Geelong	19 years, 17 days	16	6	1	
Ray O'Rourke	Geelong	21 years, 86 days	1	2	0	Father of Bryde O'Rourke.
Leigh Matthews	Hawthorn	17 years, 147 days	16	332	915	Voted "Player of the 20th Century". Brother of Kelvin Matthews.
Peter Knights	Hawthorn	17 years, 62 days	9	264	201	
Brian Douge	Hawthorn	18 years, 125 days	13	91	8	
Bruce Stevenson	Hawthorn	19 years, 254 days	3	72	26	
Geoff Smith	Hawthorn	20 years, 165 days	1	38	24	
Gene Chiron	Hawthorn	19 years, 145 days	1	37	1	
Ron Stubbs	Hawthorn	20 years, 184 days	1	17	5	
Lindsay Tipping	Hawthorn	19 years, 141 days	20	12	0	
Greg Wells	Melbourne	19 years, 71 days	18	224	251	
Trevor Rollinson	Melbourne	21 years, 264 days	1	49	1	
Robert McKenzie	Melbourne	19 years, 42 days	14	42	21	
Paul Rowlands	Melbourne	19 years, 319 days	2	35	0	
Peter Sinclair	Melbourne	22 years, 5 days	8	34	18	
John Letcher	Melbourne	18 years, 132 days	2	25	2	
David Hone	Melbourne	22 years, 281 days	1	18	3	
Russell Colcott	Melbourne	19 years, 279 days	10	15	18	
Blair Campbell	Melbourne	22 years, 248 days	4	12	23	Previously played for Richmond.
Danny Jennings	Melbourne	20 years, 13 days	17	9	3	
Mark Mitchell	Melbourne	17 years, 285 days	10	6	2	
Daryl Powell	Melbourne	17 years, 084 days	19	2	0	
David Hayes	Melbourne	20 years, 107 days	6	1	0	
Steve Arnott	Melbourne	20 years, 148 days	11	1	0	
Ray Sampson	Melbourne	19 years, 284 days	19	1	0	
David Dench	North Melbourne	17 years, 330 days	15	275	29	
David Pretty	North Melbourne	18 years, 3 days	1	58	12	
Geoff Bryant	North Melbourne	22 years, 257 days	1	45	16	
Rod Elliott	North Melbourne	17 years, 307 days	3	15	9	
Noel Fincher	North Melbourne	24 years, 320 days	4	15	0	Previously played for Footscray
Frank Dimattina	North Melbourne	22 years, 200 days	11	14	16	Previously played for Richmond. Father of Paul Dimattina
John Duthie	North Melbourne	18 years, 76 days	4	11	5	
Brian Neal	North Melbourne	21 years, 108 days	20	5	10	
Lindsay Jacob	North Melbourne	22 years, 132 days	1	2	2	
Dick Ivey	North Melbourne	22 years, 34 days	15	1	0	
Ian Owen	Richmond	20 years, 279 days	4	33	0	
Colin Beard	Richmond	27 years, 205 days	13	33	0	
Graham Robbins	Richmond	20 years, 53 days	12	13	9	
Ray Ball	Richmond	20 years, 58 days	3	12	0	Father of Luke and Matthew Ball.
Ron Thomas	Richmond	20 years, 211 days	5	11	0	
John Ferguson	Richmond	20 years, 73 days	9	7	0	
Wayne Judd	Richmond	20 years, 217 days	9	7	9	
Brenton Miels	Richmond	21 years, 146 days	10	7	1	
Anthony Smith	Richmond	18 years, 119 days	17	4	1	
Brian Shinners	Richmond	19 years, 277 days	6	2	0	
Barrie Trotter	Richmond	19 years, 134 days	13	2	0	
Glenn Elliott	St Kilda	18 years, 289 days	9	138	69	
Stephen Theodore	St Kilda	18 years, 128 days	4	134	111	
Barry Lawrence	St Kilda	23 years, 51 days	1	126	80	Father of Steven Lawrence.
Stephen Rae	St Kilda	17 years, 17 days	7	55	38	
Colin Antonie	St Kilda	17 years, 87 days	11	17	7	
John Evans	St Kilda	18 years, 235 days	5	14	10	
David McLeish	South Melbourne	19 years, 112 days	12	213	22	
Steven Hoffman	South Melbourne	17 years, 238 days	7	149	187	
John Pitura	South Melbourne	18 years, 217 days	4	99	71	Father of Mark Pitura.
Robert Doyle	South Melbourne	18 years, 102 days	4	77	36	Father of Stephen Doyle.
Wayne Walsh	South Melbourne	22 years, 333 days	1	63	5	Previously played for Richmond.
Ron Wetzel	South Melbourne	22 years, 32 days	9	18	1	
Sid Catlin	South Melbourne	19 years, 123 days	4	15	14	Previously played for Melbourne.
Graham Brandt	South Melbourne	22 years, 35 days	1	13	2	
Bob Svorinich	South Melbourne	19 years, 26 days	6	8	7	
Arthur Budd	South Melbourne	23 years, 99 days	1	7	2	
Ken Luscombe	South Melbourne	18 years, 100 days	7	7	0	
Alan Richardson	South Melbourne	28 years, 228 days	13	7	9	Previously played for Richmond. Father of Matthew Richardson.
Gary Williams	South Melbourne	19 years, 55 days	19	6	6	
Rob Dowsing	South Melbourne	21 years, 214 days	1	4	6	
John Coghlan	South Melbourne	22 years, 143 days	3	2	0	
Reuben Cooper	South Melbourne	17 years, 339 days	15	2	0	
Graham Page	South Melbourne	18 years, 134 days	4	1	0	
John Hartree	South Melbourne	21 years, 139 days	20	1	0	
