= 1970 VFL finals series =

1970 premiership season
- Date: 5–28 September 1970
- Teams: 4
- Premiers: Carlton (12th premiership)
- Runners-up: Collingwood (1st grand final)
- Minor premiers: Collingwood (14th minor premiership)

Attendance
- Matches played: 4
- Total attendance: 446,988 (111,747 per match)
- Highest: 121,696 (Grand Final, Collingwood vs. Carlton)

The 1970 Victorian Football League finals series was the 74th annual edition of the VFL/AFL final series, the Australian rules football tournament staged to determine the winner of the 1970 VFL Premiership season. The series ran over four weekends in September 1970, culminating with the 1970 VFL Grand Final at the Melbourne Cricket Ground on 26 September 1970.

== Qualification ==
The top four teams on the ladder at the end of the home-and-away rounds of the 1970 VFL Premiership season qualified for the finals series. It was the first season in which featured 22 home-and-away rounds, meaning that each club played all the others twice.

== Venues ==
All the finals matches were hosted at the Melbourne Cricket Ground and for the second straight year, official crowd attendances at each finals match exceeded 100,000 spectators. Although VFL Park had hosted its first VFL match in April 1970, the stadium's construction was not yet complete and all finals remained contracted to the Melbourne Cricket Ground until at least 1971, and so the new would not host its first VFL final until 1972.

== Matches ==
The system used for the 1970 VFL finals series was the Page–McIntyre system, also known as the McIntyre final four system, which had been used by the VFL since 1931. The first- and second-placed teams would contest the second semi-final, while the third- and fourth-placed teams would contest the first semi-final. The loser of the first semi-final would be eliminated, while the winner would advance to the preliminary final, while the loser of the second semi-final would receive a "double chance" in the preliminary final, and the winner would advance directly to the grand final. The winner of the preliminary final would then play off in the grand final, and the loser would be eliminated.

=== Week one: First Semi-final (St Kilda v South Melbourne) ===
==== Teams ====
The First Semi-final saw third-placed St Kilda play fourth-placed South Melbourne at the MCG. South Melbourne was competing in its first VFL finals series since 1945 and were the sentimental favourite, while the Saints were competing in their seventh finals series in the last ten seasons, and still had a number of their stars from the 1966 premiership triumph. Interestingly, this was the first time the two clubs had met in a VFL final, despite being foundation members of the VFL. It was a special occasion for Swans captain Bob Skilton, who had returned to action after missing the whole of 1969 due to a snapped Achilles – he was playing his first final in his 218th game, which at the time set the record for the longest wait for any VFL/AFL player before playing in a final.

St Kilda	South Melbourne

St Kilda
B:	12 Gary Colling	6 Bob Murray	16 Jon Lilley
HB:	29 Neil Besanko	18 Kevin Neale	25 Daryl Griffiths
C:	26 John Manzie	15 Jeff Moran	7 Stuart Trott
HF:	32 Stephen Rae	9 John McIntosh	17 Barry Breen
F:	23 Stephen Theodore	13 Barry Lawrence	10 Carl Ditterich
Foll:	2 Brian Mynott	20 Travis Payze	3 Ross Smith
Res:	21 Bob Pascoe	35 Geoff Ward	
Coach:	Allan Jeans		

South Melbourne
B:	15 Graeme Jacobs	5 John Rantall	33 Greg Lambert
HB:	21 John Pitura	8 Tony Haenen	27 Reg Gleeson
C:	4 Keith Baskin	10 Wayne Walsh	29 David McLeish
HF:	11 Peter Bedford	17 Russell Cook	7 Gary Brice
F:	26 Steven Hoffman	20 John Sudholz	31 Stuart Bennett
Foll:	30 Fred Way	6 John Murphy	14 Bob Skilton (c)
Res:	25 Haydn McAuliffe	37 Richard Luke	
Coach:	Norm Smith		

==== Match summary ====
St Kilda ended the fairytale VFL season of South Melbourne and Bobby Skilton at the Melbourne Cricket Ground on Saturday. Despite maintaining a lead the first quarter, fifteen great minutes in the second quarter saw South Melbourne grab the lead at half-time. For the rest of the match it St Kilda regaining and maintaining their previous lead In the end, height, weight and discipline told, and St Kilda won by 53 points.

Scorecard

First Semi-final
Saturday, 5 September (2:30pm)	St Kilda	def.	South Melbourne	MCG (crowd: 104,239)	Report
6.1 (37); 9.3 (57); 14.8 (92); 22.11 (143)	Q1; Q2; Q3; Final	2.5 (17); 9.8 (62); 10.10 (70); 13.12 (90)	Umpires: Sleeth; Television broadcast: Seven Network
Rae 4 Payze, Mynott, Ditterich 3 Theodore, Smith, Lawrence, Breen 2 McIntosh 1	Goals	4 Hoffman; 3 Bedford, Sudholz; 2 Cook; 1 Skilton
Smith, Colling, Payze, Mynott, Ditterich, Lilley, Manzie, Breen	Best	Hoffman, Brice, Bedford, Walsh, Murphy, Pitura, Skilton, Haenen, Cook
Griffiths (concussion / broken nose)	Injuries	Nil
Nil	Reports	Baskin (striking)

=== Week two: Second Semi-final (Collingwood v Carlton) ===
The Second Semi-final saw Collingwood play Carlton at the MCG. This was the 14th meeting between the two clubs in finals, having previously met in the 1969 Second Semi-final. Carlton had won nine of the encounters, including the last six meetings.

==== Match summary ====
Collingwood, the hottest VFL favourite in a decade, won its way into the 1970 grand final on Saturday, but three players almost confounded its expectations. Collingwood had a far more even team, won the ball more often, outmarked its opponents by 77 to 51 yet lost the lead in every quarter and got home by only 10 points. Amid the tension bordering on delirium which always accompanies a Collingwood-Carlton finals clash, the lead changed 10 times before the biggest semi-final crowd in history.

Scorecard

Second Semi-final
Saturday, 12 September (2:30pm)	Collingwood	def.	Carlton	MCG (crowd: 112,838)	Report
5.2 (32); 9.7 (61); 12.11 (83); 17.16 (118)	Q1; Q2; Q3; Final	5.0 (30); 9.2 (56); 14.3 (87); 17.6 (108)	Umpires: Crouch; Television broadcast: Seven Network
McKenna 9 Thompson 4 Tuddenham, Waters, Dunne, M Richardson 1	Goals	8 Jesaulenko; 2 Thornley, Hopkins; 1 Gallagher, Hall, Walls, Crosswell, Jackson
Nil	Injuries	Nil
Adamson (striking)	Reports	Jackson (striking)

=== Week three: Preliminary final (Carlton v St Kilda) ===
The Preliminary final saw Carlton play St Kilda at the MCG on Saturday, 19 September. This was the fourth final between the two clubs, having previously met in the finals in 1907, 1908 and 1929, with Carlton winning all three encounters.

==== Match summary ====
In what was predicted to be a close match, Carlton blew away St Kilda in the second half. In what turned out to be a chilling premonition, esteemed veteran journalist Rohan Rivett wrote the following in his article covering the game for the Canberra Times:

As Collingwood's coach, Bob Rose, watched Carlton's weak links of the previous week becoming bastions of strength, he must have wondered if once again his hopes of a Collingwood premiership will be dashed at the eleventh hour.

.

Scorecard

Preliminary final
Saturday, 19 September (7:50pm)	Carlton	def.	St Kilda	MCG (crowd: 108,215)	Report
2.6 (18); 6.12 (48); 13.16 (94); 17.21 (123)	Q1; Q2; Q3; Final	1.4 (10); 4.12 (36); 6.16 (52); 7.19 (61)	Umpires: Jolley; Television broadcast: Seven Network
Jackson 6 Jesaulenko, Jones 4 Walls 2 Nicholls 1	Goals	2 McIntosh, Breen; 1 Lawrence, Mynott, Payze
Crosswell, Jackson, Nicholls, Gallagher, Jesaulenko, Jones, Robertson, Crane	Best	Smith, Breen, Mynott, McIntosh, Trott, Moran, Manzie, Rae
Graham (shoulder), Broad (concussion)	Injuries	Nil
Nil	Reports	Nil

=== Week four (Grand Final) ===
This marked the fourth meeting in a VFL Grand final between Carlton and Collingwood.

Grand final
26 September (2:30 pm)	Collingwood	def. by	Carlton	MCG (crowd: 121,696)	Report
4.8 (32); 10.13 (73); 13.16 (94); 14.17 (101)	Q1; Q2; Q3; Final	0.3 (3); 4.5 (29); 12.5 (77); 17.9 (111)	Umpires: Jolley; Television broadcast: Seven Network
McKenna 6 Tuddenham, Thompson, Dunne 2 Britt, W.Richardson 1	Goals	4 Hopkins; 3 Jesaulenko; 2 Gallagher, Walls, Crosswell, Nicholls; 1 Jackson, Silvagni
Price, Dunne, M.Richardson, W.Richardson, Jenkin, Waters, McKenna	Best	McKay, Crosswell, Robertson, Nicholls, Jesaulenko, Jackson, Silvagni, Walls
Nil	Injuries	Nil
Nil	Reports	Nil

== Bibliography ==
- Atkinson, Graeme; Atkinson, Brant (2009). The Complete Book of AFL Finals (4th ed.). Scoresby, Victoria: The Five Mile Press. ISBN 9781742112756.
- Dowsing, Jeff (2015). Collingwood's 50 Most Sensational Games (ePUB). ISBN 9781458168610.
