= 1971 VFL grand final =

Grand final of the 1971 Victorian Football League season

1971 VFL Grand Final

Hawthorn	St Kilda
12.10 (82)	11.9 (75)
	1	2	3	4
HAW	2.2 (14)	4.4 (28)	5.7 (37)	12.10 (82)
STK	2.1 (13)	4.6 (30)	8.9 (57)	11.9 (75)
- Date: 25 September 1971
- Stadium: Melbourne Cricket Ground, Melbourne, Australia
- Attendance: 118,192

Broadcast in Australia
- Network: Seven Network

The 1971 VFL Grand Final was an Australian rules football game contested between the Hawthorn Football Club and St Kilda Football Club, held at the Melbourne Cricket Ground in Melbourne on 25 September 1971. It was the 74th annual grand final of the Victorian Football League, staged to determine the premiers for the 1971 VFL season. The match, attended 118,192 spectators, was won by Hawthorn by a margin of 7 points, marking that club's second premiership.

== Background ==
This was St Kilda's first appearance in a premiership decider since winning the 1966 VFL Grand Final, while for Hawthorn it was their first since losing the 1963 VFL Grand Final. Both clubs were aiming for their second premiership.

At the conclusion of the regular home-and-away season, Hawthorn had finished first on the ladder with 19 wins and 3 losses. St Kilda had finished second with 16 wins and 6 losses. Hawthorn's Peter Hudson was the leading goal-kicker in the competition with 140 goals.

In the finals series leading up to the grand final, Hawthorn met St Kilda in the second semi final, Hawthorn dominated early with Hudson kicking 7 goals to be well clear by three quarter time. St Kilda staged a fightback to lose by only two points. Hawthorn's victory sent them straight through to the grand final. St Kilda, after this loss, defeated Richmond by 30 points in the preliminary final to match up with Hawthorn in the premiership decider.

== Match summary ==
Team	1	2	3	Final
Hawthorn	2.2	4.4	5.7	12.10 (82)
St Kilda	2.1	4.6	8.9	11.9 (75)

The match was played in wet conditions and it was probably the toughest grand final ever played. Both sides dished out physical punishment and copped it as well. It was an evenly fought contest throughout.

=== 1st quarter ===
Hawthorn started well with star full forward Peter Hudson kicking two goals early in the term. St Kilda's fullback Bob Murray was hurt early, and then Cowboy Neale clashed heavily with Hudson leaving Hudson with double vision for the rest of the game. Murray was moved to full forward and Barry Lawrence was moved onto Hawthorn's Hudson and kept him well in check. Les Hawken who had a fitness test earlier in the week hurt his ankle again after a clash with Carl Ditterich and was replaced by Ken Beck.

=== 2nd quarter ===
The rain was relentless and Peter Crimmins kicked an early goal, Murray was replaced by Stephen Rae and Hawthorn's Robert Day was crunched by Neil Besanko in a marking contest. St Kilda managed to inch ahead with goals to John Manzie and Barry Breen. Hudson with concussion kicked his third after an in-the-back free kick.

=== 3rd quarter ===
In the Hawthorn rooms, both Hudson and Robert Day were suffering from concussion, Day being worst, was replaced at half time by Ray Wilson. As no one else could replace Hudson he played on. The Saints were two points up at half time and had the better of the third term. John Bonney goaled from a mark within thirty seconds. Bonney again goaled five minutes later after a free 30 metres out in front. Barry Breen goaled after being disallowed a mark and playing on, and then Ross Smith kicked the Saints' fourth goal and they led by twenty seven points by the fifteen-minute mark. A late snap from Leon Rice kicked the Hawks' only goal for the quarter and reduced St Kilda's lead to 20 points at three quarter time.

=== Final quarter ===
At the 3/4 time address John Kennedy told Bob Keddie " You'll have to win this for us. Bob!", Keddie had been quiet with only five touches. Keddie was moved to full-forward and Hudson out to centre-half-forward, Matthews goaled with a long shot from a free, Moore became unpassable across half back and Keddie kicked his first goal from a snap in the goal square. Crimmins kicked the Hawks' third in three minutes from a running snap. Keddie added two points to level the scores, a minute later Keddie marked on the edge of the goal square, he goaled and the Hawks regained the lead. After another long arm-wrestle Don Scott gathers the ball at half forward and a mongrel kick rolls through for Hawthorn's 10th goal. Keddie outmanoeuvres three opponents to snap his third goal. St Kilda's John Bonney goals straight after the restart. Another Hawthorn forward thrust and Keddie marks in the goal square, he handballs to Hudson but the goal is disallowed as Keddie had moved over his mark. Keddie goals and becomes Hawthorn's match winner with four goals in the space of 16 minutes during the last quarter. Hawks led by nineteen points at the nineteen-minute mark of the final quarter. Goals to St Kilda's Allan Davis and Barry Breen reduced the final margin to seven points.

The Hawks scored 7.3 in the quarter to the Saints' three straight goals.

Going into the game, Hudson needed four goals to surpass Bob Pratt's record for most goals in a VFL season but only managed to kick three which left him level with Pratt on 150 goals. Late in the game he had a set shot on goal to break the record but kicked the ball into the man on the mark, Barry Lawrence. His last attempt for the record, had Hudson kicking out of bounds on the full after running towards an open goal.

Hawthorn's next success came five years later, when they won the 1976 VFL Grand Final against North Melbourne. It would take another 26 years for St Kilda to appear in another premiership decider, when they were defeated by Adelaide in the 1997 AFL Grand Final.

== Teams ==
Hawthorn	St Kilda

Hawthorn
B:	27 David Parkin (c)	15 Kelvin Moore	18 Les Hawken
HB:	12 Robert Day	16 Norm Bussell	20 Ian Bremner
C:	13 Leon Rice	33 Geoff Angus	30 Des Meagher
HF:	2 Bob Keddie	14 Alan Martello	9 Michael Porter
F:	8 Kevin Heath	26 Peter Hudson	32 Leigh Matthews
Foll:	23 Don Scott	34 Bruce Stevenson	5 Peter Crimmins (vc)
Res:	4 Ken Beck	10 Ray Wilson	
Coach:	John Kennedy, Sr.		

St Kilda
B:	42 Wayne Judson	6 Bob Murray (vc)	18 Kevin Neale
HB:	12 Gary Colling	13 Barry Lawrence	29 Neil Besanko
C:	26 John Manzie	8 Glenn Elliott	7 Stuart Trott
HF:	15 Jeff Moran	17 Barry Breen	23 Stephen Theodore
F:	10 Carl Ditterich	19 Allan Davis	1 John Bonney
Foll:	2 Brian Mynott	20 Travis Payze	3 Ross Smith (c)
Res:	31 Rod Galt	25 Stephen Rae	
Coach:	Allan Jeans		

== Goalkickers ==
Hawthorn:

- Keddie 4
- Hudson 3
- Crimmins 2
- Matthews 1
- Rice 1
- Scott 1

St Kilda:

- Breen 3
- Bonney 3
- Davis 1
- Manzie 1
- Smith 1
- Theodore 1
- Trott 1

== See also ==
- 1971 VFL season
