= 1969 Hawthorn Football Club season =

45th season in the Victorian Football League

Hawthorn Football Club
1969 season
- President: Phil J. Ryan
- Coach: John Kennedy, Sr.
- Captain: David Parkin
- Home ground: Glenferrie Oval
- VFL season: 13–7 (5th)
- Finals series: Did not qualify
- Best and Fairest: Bob Keddie
- Leading goalkicker: Peter Hudson (120)
- Highest home attendance: 28,802 (Round 1 vs. Collingwood)
- Lowest home attendance: 13,288 (Round 5 vs. Melbourne)
- Average home attendance: 17,693

The 1969 season was the Hawthorn Football Club's 45th season in the Victorian Football League and 68th overall.

== Fixture ==
=== Premiership season ===
Rd	Date and local time	Opponent	Scores (Hawthorn's scores indicated in bold)			Venue	Attendance	Record
Rd	Date and local time	Opponent	Home	Away	Result	Venue	Attendance	Record
1	Saturday, 5 April (2:10 pm)	Collingwood	**17.9 (111)**	11.23 (89)	Won by 22 points	Glenferrie Oval (H)	28,802	1–0
2	Saturday, 12 April (2:10 pm)	Carlton	30.30 (210)	**12.10 (82)**	Lost by 128 points	Princes Park (A)	25,894	1–1
3	Saturday, 19 April (2:10 pm)	Essendon	12.13 (85)	**14.14 (98)**	Won by 13 points	Windy Hill (A)	15,770	2–1
4	Saturday, 26 April (2:10 pm)	Footscray	**19.16 (130)**	12.13 (85)	Won by 45 points	Glenferrie Oval (H)	15,622	3–1
5	Saturday, 3 May (2:10 pm)	Melbourne	**21.10 (136)**	14.20 (104)	Won by 32 points	Glenferrie Oval (H)	13,288	4–1
6	Saturday, 10 May (2:10 pm)	North Melbourne	13.9 (87)	**14.12 (96)**	Won by 9 points	Arden Street Oval (A)	15,338	5–1
7	Saturday, 17 May (2:10 pm)	Richmond	7.10 (52)	**8.13 (61)**	Won by 9 points	Melbourne Cricket Ground (A)	35,933	6–1
8	Saturday, 24 May (2:10 pm)	Geelong	**13.16 (94)**	13.12 (90)	Won by 4 points	Glenferrie Oval (H)	21,888	7–1
9	Saturday, 31 May (2:10 pm)	St Kilda	14.11 (95)	**7.7 (49)**	Lost by 46 points	Moorabbin Oval (A)	15,168	7–2
10	Saturday, 7 June (2:10 pm)	Fitzroy	12.9 (81)	**16.9 (105)**	Won by 24 points	Princes Park (A)	10,526	8–2
11	Saturday, 21 June (2:10 pm)	South Melbourne	**25.13 (163)**	14.21 (105)	Won by 58 points	Glenferrie Oval (H)	13,721	9–2
12	Saturday, 28 June (2:10 pm)	Collingwood	9.24 (78)	**6.11 (47)**	Lost by 31 points	Victoria Park (A)	31,923	9–3
13	Saturday, 5 July (2:10 pm)	Carlton	**11.14 (80)**	22.17 (149)	Lost by 69 points	Glenferrie Oval (H)	19,480	9–4
14	Saturday, 12 July (2:10 pm)	Essendon	**17.19 (121)**	16.18 (114)	Won by 7 points	Glenferrie Oval (H)	17,605	10–4
15	Saturday, 19 July (2:10 pm)	Footscray	15.16 (106)	**14.9 (93)**	Lost by 13 points	Western Oval (A)	15,955	10–5
16	Saturday, 26 July (2:10 pm)	Melbourne	13.17 (95)	**21.5 (131)**	Won by 36 points	Melbourne Cricket Ground (A)	32,527	11–5
17	Saturday, 9 August (2:10 pm)	North Melbourne	**22.12 (144)**	18.18 (126)	Won by 18 points	Glenferrie Oval (H)	13,504	12–5
18	Saturday, 16 August (2:10 pm)	Richmond	**13.10 (88)**	13.21 (99)	Lost by 11 points	Glenferrie Oval (H)	19,480	12–6
19	Saturday, 23 August (2:10 pm)	Geelong	16.14 (110)	**14.11 (95)**	Lost by 15 points	Kardinia Park (A)	31,569	12–7
20	Saturday, 30 August (2:10 pm)	St Kilda	**14.17 (101)**	13.12 (90)	Won by 11 points	Glenferrie Oval (H)	13,539	13–7

== Ladder ==
(P)	Premiers
	Qualified for finals

#	Team	P	W	L	D	PF	PA	%	Pts
1	Collingwood	20	15	5	0	2129	1651	129.0	60
2	Carlton	20	15	5	0	2260	1875	120.5	60
3	Geelong	20	13	6	1	2092	1745	119.9	54
4	Richmond (P)	20	13	7	0	2060	1653	124.6	52
5	Hawthorn	20	13	7	0	2025	2050	98.8	52
6	Essendon	20	10	9	1	1941	1893	102.5	42
7	St Kilda	20	9	11	0	1803	1747	103.2	36
8	North Melbourne	20	8	12	0	1859	2125	87.5	32
9	South Melbourne	20	7	13	0	1803	2186	82.5	28
10	Fitzroy	20	7	13	0	1745	2118	82.4	28
11	Footscray	20	6	14	0	1778	2079	85.5	24
12	Melbourne	20	3	17	0	1838	2211	83.1	12

Rules for classification: 1. premiership points; 2. percentage; 3. points for
Average score: 97.2
Source: AFL Tables
