= David McLeish =

David McLeish may refer to:

- David McLeish (Australian footballer) (born 1950), Australian rules footballer
- David McLeish (rugby union) (born 1975), Scottish rugby union player
