= Bruce Davidson =

Bruce Davidson may refer to:

- Bruce Davidson (equestrian) (born 1949), American equestrian
- Bruce Davidson (footballer) (born 1950), Australian footballer for Footscray
- Bruce Davidson (photographer) (born 1933), American photographer
- Bruce Davidson (politician) (born 1951), Australian politician

== See also ==
- Bruce Davison (born 1946), American actor
