= Rollinson =

Surname

Rollinson is a surname. Notable people with this surname are:

- Adrian Rollinson (born 1965), British strongman competitor
- Alan Rollinson (1943–2019), British former racing driver from England
- Bill Rollinson (1856–1938), American Major League Baseball catcher for one game
- Christopher Rollinson (1928–1988), New Zealand boxer
- John K. Rollinson (1884–1948), American writer of western non-fiction
- Neil Rollinson (born 1960), British poet
- Samuel Rollinson (1827–1891) English architect
- Tim Rollinson (civil servant) (born 1953), British public servant and forester
- Tim Rollinson (musician) (born 1959), Australian jazz guitarist and composer
- Trevor Rollinson (born 1947), Australian rules footballer
