= Stuart Bennett =

Stuart Bennett may refer to:

- Stuart Bennett (footballer) (born 1946), Australian rules footballer
- Stuart Bennett (bowls), Irish bowls player
- Wade Barrett (born Stuart Alexander Bennett, 1980), professional wrestling commentator and former professional wrestler
