= Ron Wetzel =

Ron Wetzel may refer to:

- Ron Wetzel (American football) (born 1960), American former NFL- and USFL player
- Ron Wetzel (Australian footballer) (born 1947), Australian former VFL player
