= 1966 Hawthorn Football Club season =

42nd season in the Victorian Football League

Hawthorn Football Club
1966 season
- President: Dr. A.S. Ferguson
- Coach: Peter O'Donohue
- Captain: Graham Arthur
- Home ground: Glenferrie Oval
- VFL season: 5–13 (9th)
- Finals Series: Did not qualify
- Best and Fairest: Ray Wilson
- Leading goalkicker: John Peck (32)
- Highest home attendance: 21,520 (Round 17 vs. Essendon)
- Lowest home attendance: 8,429 (Round 16 vs. Footscray)
- Average home attendance: 14,679

The 1966 season was the Hawthorn Football Club's 42nd season in the Victorian Football League and 65th overall. Following the season John Kennedy Sr. returned as coach.

== Fixture ==
=== Premiership season ===
Rd	Date and local time	Opponent	Scores (Hawthorn's scores indicated in bold)			Venue	Attendance	Record
Rd	Date and local time	Opponent	Home	Away	Result	Venue	Attendance	Record
1	Saturday, 23 April (2:20 pm)	Collingwood	17.13 (115)	**9.8 (62)**	Lost by 53 points	Victoria Park (A)	32,741	0–1
2	Saturday, 30 April (2:20 pm)	Melbourne	**7.14 (56)**	3.11 (29)	Won by 27 points	Glenferrie Oval (H)	12,054	1–1
3	Saturday, 7 May (2:20 pm)	South Melbourne	14.22 (106)	**7.15 (57)**	Lost by 49 points	Lake Oval (A)	16,894	1–2
4	Saturday, 14 May (2:20 pm)	North Melbourne	**9.13 (67)**	14.15 (99)	Lost by 32 points	Glenferrie Oval (H)	10,816	1–3
5	Saturday, 21 May (2:20 pm)	Footscray	10.10 (70)	**4.10 (34)**	Lost by 36 points	Western Oval (A)	12,424	1–4
6	Saturday, 28 May (2:20 pm)	Essendon	15.15 (105)	**12.9 (81)**	Lost by 24 points	Windy Hill (A)	15,329	1–5
7	Saturday, 4 June (2:20 pm)	St Kilda	**11.12 (78)**	15.12 (102)	Lost by 24 points	Glenferrie Oval (H)	17,755	1–6
8	Monday, 13 June (2:20 pm)	Fitzroy	8.13 (61)	**11.14 (80)**	Won by 19 points	Brunswick Street Oval (A)	13,057	2–6
9	Saturday, 18 June (2:20 pm)	Carlton	**9.13 (67)**	9.9 (63)	Won by 4 points	Glenferrie Oval (H)	19,504	3–6
10	Saturday, 25 June (2:20 pm)	Geelong	17.15 (117)	**8.9 (57)**	Lost by 60 points	Kardinia Park (A)	13,941	3–7
11	Saturday, 9 July (2:20 pm)	Richmond	**6.13 (49)**	11.13 (79)	Lost by 30 points	Glenferrie Oval (H)	15,880	3–8
12	Saturday, 16 July (2:20 pm)	Collingwood	**5.7 (37)**	16.14 (110)	Lost by 73 points	Glenferrie Oval (H)	13,880	3–9
13	Saturday, 23 July (2:20 pm)	Melbourne	23.13 (151)	**9.5 (59)**	Lost by 92 points	Melbourne Cricket Ground (A)	18,254	3–10
14	Saturday, 30 July (2:20 pm)	South Melbourne	**10.16 (76)**	14.17 (101)	Lost by 25 points	Glenferrie Oval (H)	12,277	3–11
15	Saturday, 6 August (2:20 pm)	North Melbourne	11.16 (82)	**12.11 (83)**	Won by 1 point	Arden Street Oval (A)	5,835	4–11
16	Saturday, 13 August (2:20 pm)	Footscray	**18.11 (119)**	9.13 (67)	Won by 52 points	Glenferrie Oval (H)	8,429	5–11
17	Saturday, 20 August (2:20 pm)	Essendon	**11.13 (79)**	15.10 (100)	Lost by 21 points	Glenferrie Oval (H)	21,520	5–12
18	Saturday, 27 August (2:20 pm)	St Kilda	14.9 (93)	**13.5 (83)**	Lost by 10 points	Moorabbin Oval (A)	23,860	5–13

== Ladder ==
(P)	Premiers
	Qualified for finals

#	Team	P	W	L	D	PF	PA	%	Pts
1	Collingwood	18	15	3	0	1687	1073	157.2	60
2	St Kilda (P)	18	14	4	0	1641	1149	142.8	56
3	Geelong	18	14	4	0	1599	1162	137.6	56
4	Essendon	18	14	4	0	1457	1204	121.0	56
5	Richmond	18	13	4	1	1626	1320	123.2	54
6	Carlton	18	10	8	0	1233	1143	107.9	40
7	North Melbourne	18	7	10	1	1294	1381	93.7	30
8	South Melbourne	18	7	11	0	1486	1505	98.7	28
9	Hawthorn	18	5	13	0	1224	1650	74.2	20
10	Footscray	18	4	14	0	1004	1458	68.9	16
11	Melbourne	18	3	15	0	1235	1580	78.2	12
12	Fitzroy	18	1	17	0	1004	1865	53.8	4

Rules for classification: 1. premiership points; 2. percentage; 3. points for
Average score: 76.3
Source: AFL Tables
