= Stephen Theodore =

Stephen Theodore may refer to:

- Stephen Theodore (footballer), Australian rules footballer
- Stephen Theodore (politician), Australian politician
