= 1967 Hawthorn Football Club season =

43rd season in the Victorian Football League

Hawthorn Football Club
1967 season
- President: Dr. A.S. Ferguson
- Coach: John Kennedy, Sr.
- Captain: Graham Arthur
- Home ground: Glenferrie Oval
- VFL season: 5–13 (10th)
- Finals series: Did not qualify
- Best and Fairest: Bob Keddie
- Leading goalkicker: Peter Hudson (57)
- Highest home attendance: 20,352 (Round 4 vs. St Kilda)
- Lowest home attendance: 7,857 (Round 11 vs. Footscray)
- Average home attendance: 14,783

The 1967 season was the Hawthorn Football Club's 43rd season in the Victorian Football League and 66th overall.

== Schedule ==
=== Premiership season ===
Rd	Date and local time	Opponent	Scores (Hawthorn's scores indicated in bold)			Venue	Attendance	Record
Rd	Date and local time	Opponent	Home	Away	Result	Venue	Attendance	Record
1	Saturday, 15 April (2:20 pm)	South Melbourne	**20.12 (132)**	15.12 (102)	Won by 30 points	Glenferrie Oval (H)	17,294	1–0
2	Saturday, 22 April (2:20 pm)	Carlton	12.16 (88)	**6.8 (44)**	Lost by 44 points	Princes Park (A)	25,678	1–1
3	Saturday, 29 April (2:20 pm)	Geelong	11.15 (81)	**7.5 (47)**	Lost by 34 points	Kardinia Park (A)	17,227	1–2
4	Saturday, 6 May (2:20 pm)	St Kilda	**10.6 (66)**	15.11 (101)	Lost by 35 points	Glenferrie Oval (H)	20,352	1–3
5	Saturday, 13 May (2:20 pm)	Richmond	16.22 (118)	**5.13 (43)**	Lost by 75 points	Melbourne Cricket Ground (A)	27,175	1–4
6	Saturday, 20 May (2:20 pm)	North Melbourne	**7.9 (51)**	10.13 (73)	Lost by 22 points	Glenferrie Oval (H)	10,363	1–5
7	Saturday, 27 May (2:20 pm)	Fitzroy	9.12 (66)	**16.14 (110)**	Won by 44 points	Princes Park (A)	7,608	2–5
8	Saturday, 3 June (2:20 pm)	Melbourne	**12.8 (80)**	18.17 (125)	Lost by 45 points	Glenferrie Oval (H)	13,772	2–6
9	Saturday, 10 June (2:20 pm)	Essendon	21.16 (142)	**6.15 (51)**	Lost by 91 points	Windy Hill (A)	13,273	2–7
10	Saturday, 24 June (2:20 pm)	Collingwood	17.16 (118)	**12.9 (81)**	Lost by 37 points	Victoria Park (A)	17,363	2–8
11	Saturday, 1 July (2:20 pm)	Footscray	**8.11 (59)**	14.12 (96)	Lost by 37 points	Glenferrie Oval (H)	7,857	2–9
12	Saturday, 8 July (2:20 pm)	South Melbourne	10.17 (77)	**13.12 (90)**	Won by 13 points	Lake Oval (A)	11,323	3–9
13	Saturday, 22 July (2:20 pm)	Carlton	**9.9 (63)**	11.21 (87)	Lost by 24 points	Glenferrie Oval (H)	17,552	3–10
14	Saturday, 29 July (2:20 pm)	Geelong	**11.12 (78)**	7.16 (58)	Won by 20 points	Glenferrie Oval (H)	12,556	4–10
15	Saturday, 5 August (2:20 pm)	St Kilda	17.17 (119)	**8.8 (56)**	Lost by 63 points	Moorabbin Oval (A)	23,406	4–11
16	Saturday, 12 August (2:20 pm)	Richmond	**7.12 (54)**	23.30 (168)	Lost by 114 points	Glenferrie Oval (H)	19,441	4–12
17	Saturday, 19 August (2:20 pm)	North Melbourne	9.19 (73)	**7.3 (45)**	Lost by 28 points	Arden Street Oval (A)	4,846	4–13
18	Saturday, 26 August (2:20 pm)	Fitzroy	**13.13 (91)**	10.14 (74)	Won by 17 points	Glenferrie Oval (H)	13,863	5–13

== Ladder ==
(P)	Premiers
	Qualified for finals

#	Team	P	W	L	D	PF	PA	%	Pts
1	Richmond (P)	18	15	3	0	1869	1281	145.9	60
2	Carlton	18	14	3	1	1425	1133	125.8	58
3	Geelong	18	13	5	0	1625	1323	122.8	52
4	Collingwood	18	12	6	0	1629	1232	132.2	48
5	St Kilda	18	11	7	0	1630	1328	122.7	44
6	Essendon	18	8	9	1	1406	1327	106.0	34
7	Melbourne	18	8	10	0	1258	1417	88.8	32
8	North Melbourne	18	7	10	1	1234	1310	94.2	30
9	South Melbourne	18	5	12	1	1446	1763	82.0	22
10	Hawthorn	18	5	13	0	1241	1766	70.3	20
11	Fitzroy	18	4	14	0	1193	1655	72.1	16
12	Footscray	18	4	14	0	1060	1481	71.6	16

Rules for classification: 1. premiership points; 2. percentage; 3. points for
Average score: 78.8
Source: AFL Tables
