= Lloyd Bennett =

Australian rules footballer

Personal information
- Full name: Reginald George Whitton Bennett
- Born: 8 April 1916; Devonport, Tasmania
- Died: 16 April 1995 (aged 79)
- Original team: Longford
- Height: 182 cm (6 ft 0 in)
- Weight: 83 kg (183 lb)

Playing career^{1}
Years	Club	Games (Goals)
1944	Melbourne	9 (4)
- ^{1} Playing statistics correct to the end of 1944.

Reginald George Whitton "Lloyd" Bennett (8 April 1916 – 16 April 1995) was an Australian rules footballer who played for Melbourne in the Victorian Football League (VFL). Bennett was nicknamed Lloyd after British Prime Minister David Lloyd George and won a Tasman Shields Trophy with Longford in 1940. He made his VFL debut in captain-coach Percy Beames's 200th game and made nine appearances in his only season for Melbourne.
