= Bruce Stevenson =

Australian rules footballer

Personal information
- Born: 8 August 1949 (age 77); Kew, Victoria
- Original team: Swinburne Tech
- Height: 189 cm (6 ft 2 in)
- Weight: 93 kg (205 lb)

Playing career^{1}
Years	Club	Games (Goals)
1969–1974	Hawthorn	72 (26)
- ^{1} Playing statistics correct to the end of 1974.

Bruce Stevenson (born 8 August 1949) is a former Australian rules footballer who played with Hawthorn Football Club in the Victorian Football League (VFL) and Central District and West Adelaide Football Clubs in the South Australian National Football League (SANFL).

Recruited from Swinburne Tech, Stevenson debuted in 1969 for Hawthorn and was a premiership player for Hawthorn in 1971, teaming well with Don Scott in the ruck.

Stevenson was a Hawthorn board member from 2012 until he resigned in 2017.
