= Leon Rice (footballer) =

Australian rules footballer (1951–2026)

- Rice with Hawthorn in the 1970s

Personal information
- Full name: Leon Francis Rice
- Born: 23 August 1951
- Died: 18 November 2026 (aged 75)
- Original team: Drouin
- Height: 184 cm (6 ft 0 in)
- Weight: 75 kg (165 lb)

Playing career^{1}
Years	Club	Games (Goals)
1970–1979	Hawthorn	133 (26)
1981–1982	Camberwell	12 (9)
Total		145 (35)
- ^{1} Playing statistics correct to the end of 1979.

Career highlights
- 2× VFL premiership player: 1971, 1976

Leon Francis Rice (23 August 1951 – 18 November 2026) was an Australian rules footballer who played with the Hawthorn Football Club in the Victorian Football League (VFL) during the 1970s.

== Career ==
When Rice was 14, he won the Warragul District Junior FL best and fairest in 1965. He was recruited to Hawthorn from Drouin in 1970 when the VFL had zoning areas. A wingman, Rice was a premiership player with Hawthorn in 1971 and was a reserve in their 1976 flag win.

He left Hawthorn and accepted the captain-coach position at the Camberwell Football Club. The club won 1981 VFA second division premiership.

After he retired as a player, Rice joined the Hawthorn Football Club board.

== Personal life ==
Rice died in November 2026, aged 75.

== Honours and achievements ==
Hawthorn

- 2× VFL premiership player: 1971, 1976
- 2× Minor premiership: 1971, 1975

Individual

- Hawthorn life member
