= Kevin Heath =

Australian rules footballer

Personal information
- Full name: Kevin Francis Xavier Heath
- Born: 24 March 1950 (age 76)
- Original team: Assumption College
- Height: 188 cm (6 ft 2 in)
- Weight: 92 kg (203 lb)

Playing career^{1}
Years	Club	Games (Goals)
1968–1975	Hawthorn	140 (43)
1976–1980	Carlton	78 (0)
Total		218 (43)
- ^{1} Playing statistics correct to the end of 1980.

Kevin Francis Xavier Heath (born 24 March 1950) is a former Australian rules footballer who played with Hawthorn and Carlton in the VFL during the 1970s. Kevin was also the only AFL Player to be a Cleo Centrefold in May 1978.

== Hawthorn ==
Hawthorn recruited Heath while he was still a student at Assumption College, Kilmore. Heath was an outstanding junior athlete. Heath made his senior debut at the end of 1968 as an 18-year-old. He soon became one of the regulars in the team. His career high point was when he was one of the Hawks’ best players in the 1971 VFL Grand Final.

Heath could play forward or back and represented Victoria on two occasions.

He lost his spot in the side in the middle of 1975 due to injury. He asked for a clearance to another club when the club refused to offer more money.

== Carlton ==
Heath was cleared to Carlton and easily slotted into their backline. He gave good service for four years before he found himself surpassed by younger players. He retired at the end of 1980.
