= Brian Sampson (footballer) =

Australian rules footballer

Personal information
- Full name: Brian Eric Sampson
- Born: 15 February 1941
- Died: 16 December 2012 (aged 71)
- Original team: East Sandringham
- Height: 192 cm (6 ft 4 in)
- Weight: 85 kg (187 lb)

Playing career^{1}
Years	Club	Games (Goals)
1959–1966	Essendon (VFL)	100 (45)
1967–1969	West Perth (WAFL)	49 (28)
- ^{1} Playing statistics correct to the end of 1969.

Career highlights
- 1969 WAFL Premiership

Brian Eric Sampson (15 February 1941 – 16 December 2012) was an Australian rules footballer who played for Essendon in the Victorian Football League (VFL) and West Perth in the West Australian Football League (WAFL).

== Family ==
External videos
- Essendon Football Club: Brian Sampson (1965 Grand Final Highlights).
- Native Bonsai, Gardening Australia, Series 18, Episode 24, (28 July 2007), ABC TV.
- Bill Page, "Brian Sampson: Essendon VFL Footy Player", Eastern Newsbeat, Australia Digital 44/Channel 31 Television, Eastern Regional Access Television Inc.

The son of Eric Frank Sampson (1916–2004), and Edna Florence Marie Sampson (1916–1977), née Hamilton.

He had two daughters Nicole and Danielle.

His younger brother Ray Sampson also played in the VFL for Melbourne.

== Football ==
=== Essendon (VFL) ===
A top class ruckman, he joined Essendon from East Sandringham Juniors in 1958, and had an injury-interrupted 100-game career with Essendon.

Sampson played in many positions during his time at Essendon. He debuted in 1959 and finished the year as the resting-back pocket ruckman, in their losing Grand Final side. Although his career was interrupted by knee injuries, he was 19th man for Essendon's 1962 premiership team and, as the resting-forward pocket ruckman, he was one of Essendon's best players in Essendon's 1965 win over St Kilda, where he kicked two goals.

In 1965, he played every game, won the club's Best Team Player award, and played in his second premiership team.

=== West Perth (WAFL) ===
He joined West Australian Football League club West Perth in 1967 and played 49 games, including a premiership in 1969 with the team captain-coached by Polly Farmer. During his time in Western Australia he represented their interstate team.

== Bricklayer ==
Brain's father was a bricklayer and Brian followed in his footsteps running his own bricklaying business and won the Apprenticeship Commission of Victoria's Best Overall Apprentice in bricklaying in 1959.

Brian then trained another 13 other apprentices himself; one of whom, Chris Reid, won Holmesglen College of Tafe Employer Award for "Best Overall Apprentice" in 1991.

== Artist ==
=== Bonsai ===
Brian's other passion in life was the art of bonsai and he became acclaimed throughout Australia as a bonsai speaker at clubs. His brought his knowledge of native Australian trees into his art of Bonsai. And against the normal trend of using standard miniature bonsai pots he created bonsai with ceramic pots and ceramic scenes. This was featured on ABC Television and on C31/D44 Melbourne show Eastern Newsbeat.

==== Publication ====
During his last years Brian worked to fulfill his dream of publishing a book of his Bonsai Art. Aided by Photographer and Television Producer Patricia Matsoukas Ziemer and, another Bonsai expert, Quentin Valentine, he worked while ill to publish his Bonsai book, featuring his rare native Australian bonsai and ceramic scenes, called "Miniature trees with imagination Aspects of bonsai and penjing". It was published after his death by his wife Margaret Sampson in 2013.

=== Ceramics ===
Brian also had a love affair of ceramics, his aunt was a ceramics teacher and his cousin is artist Greg Irvine. And ceramics are highlighted throughout Brian's bonsai art including figurines he created.

=== Painting ===
Brain was also a gifted painter; again featuring Australian Native Forests and water scenes, a few of these signed paintings are photographed in his (2013) book, and in art collections around Melbourne.

Samples of Brian Sampson's Art

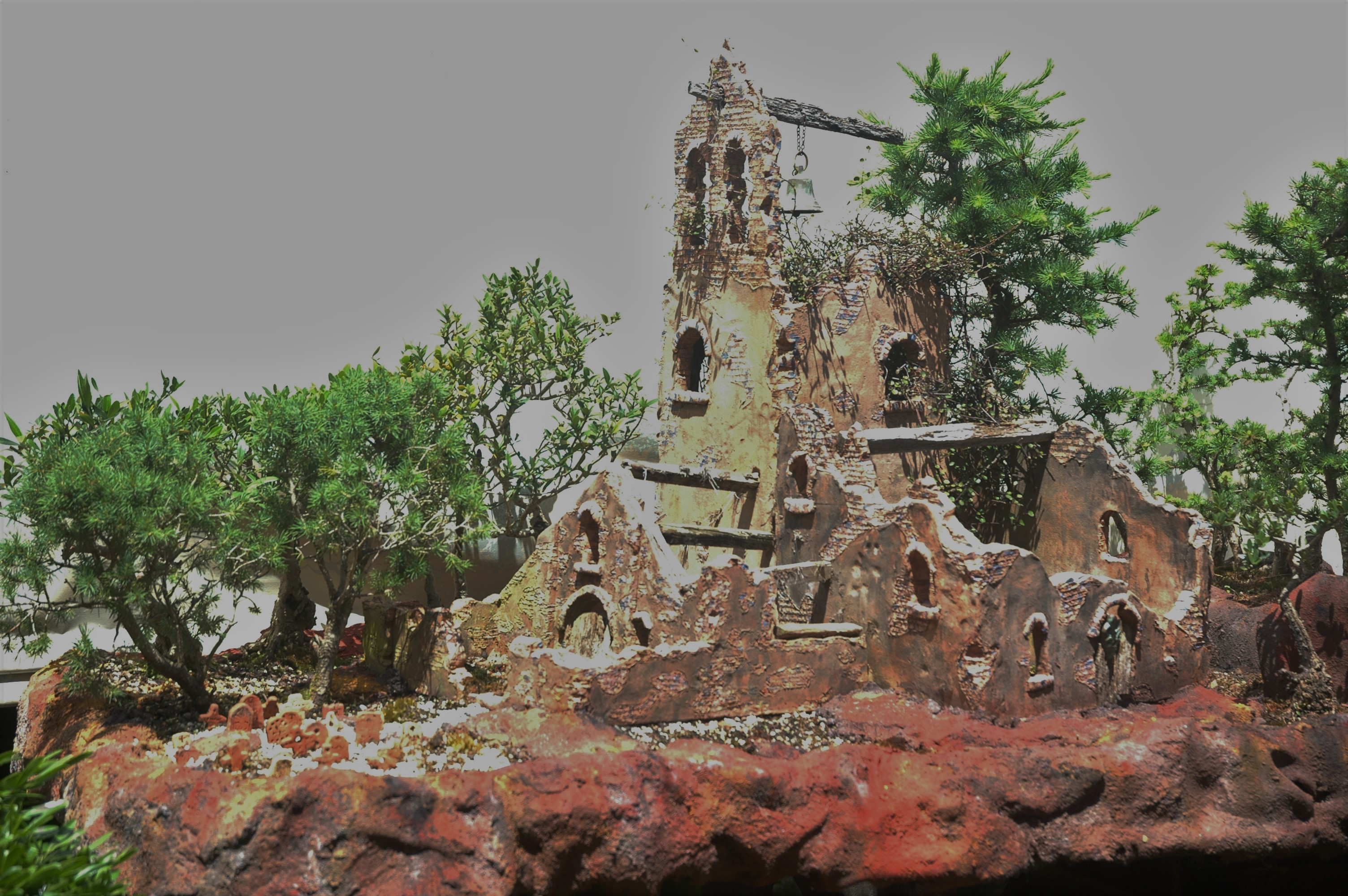
Bonsai with native Australian Trees and Ceramic Castle.

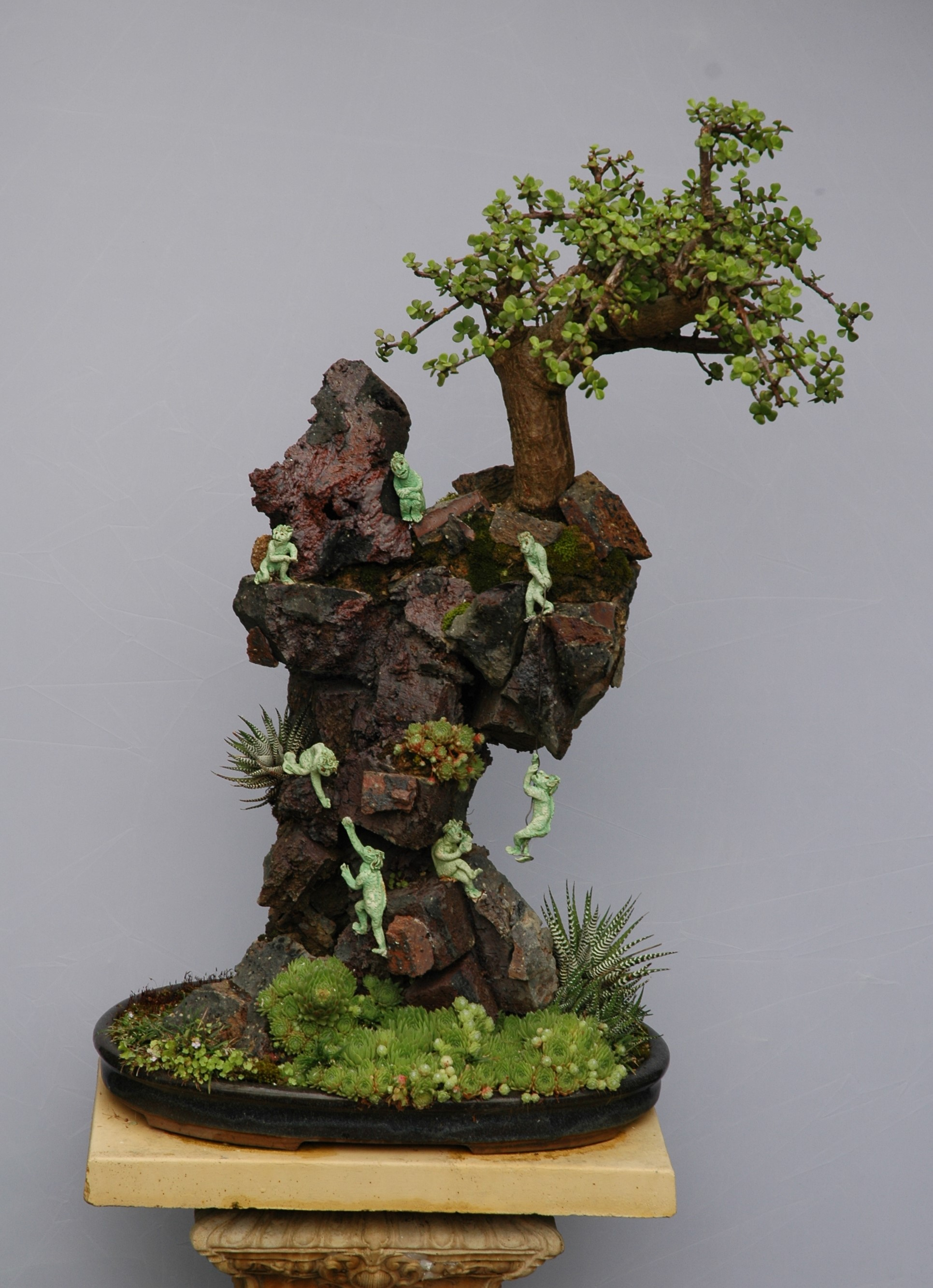
Bonsai with ceramic figurines.

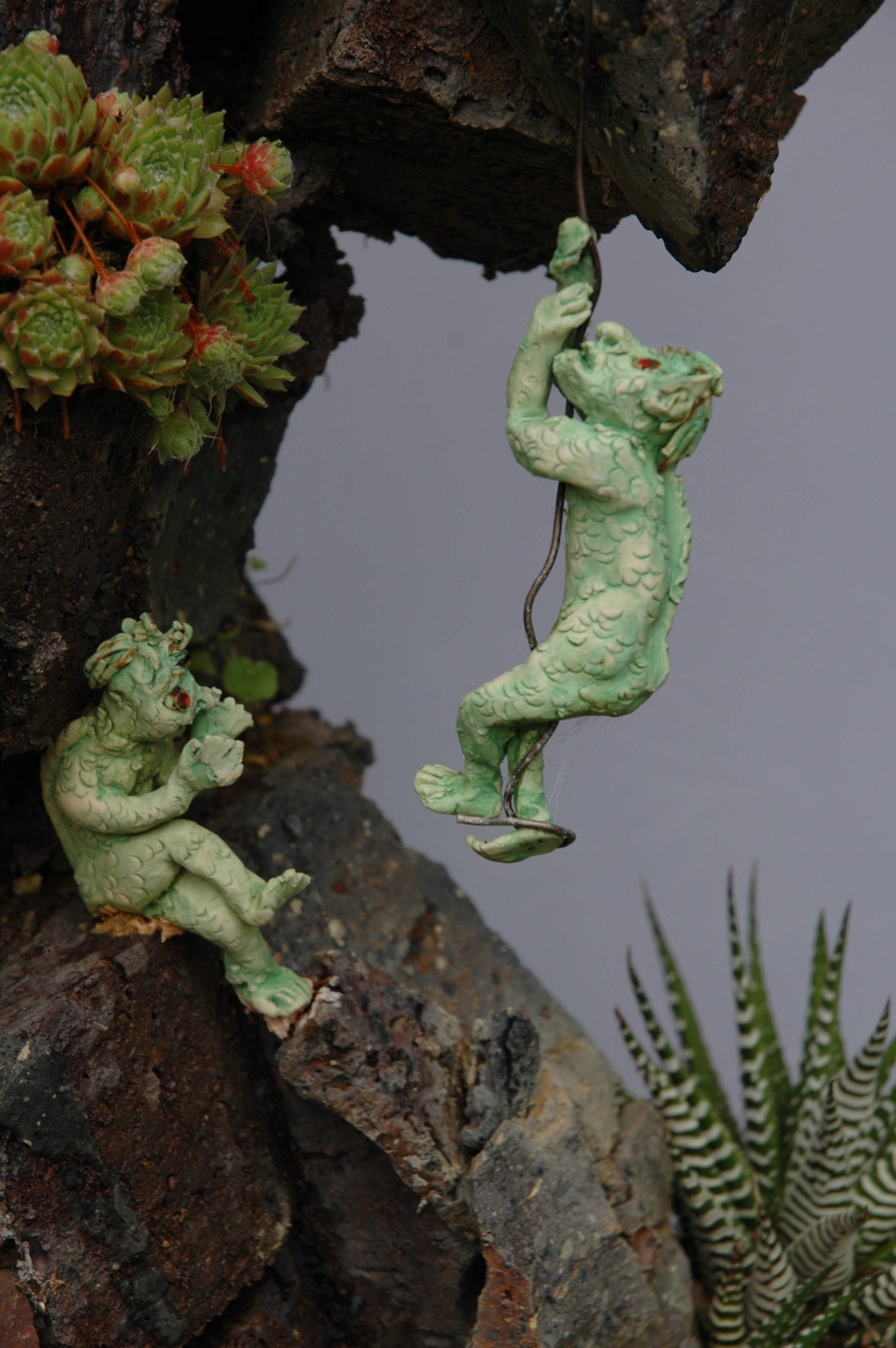
Sculpted ceramic figurines for bonsai scenes.

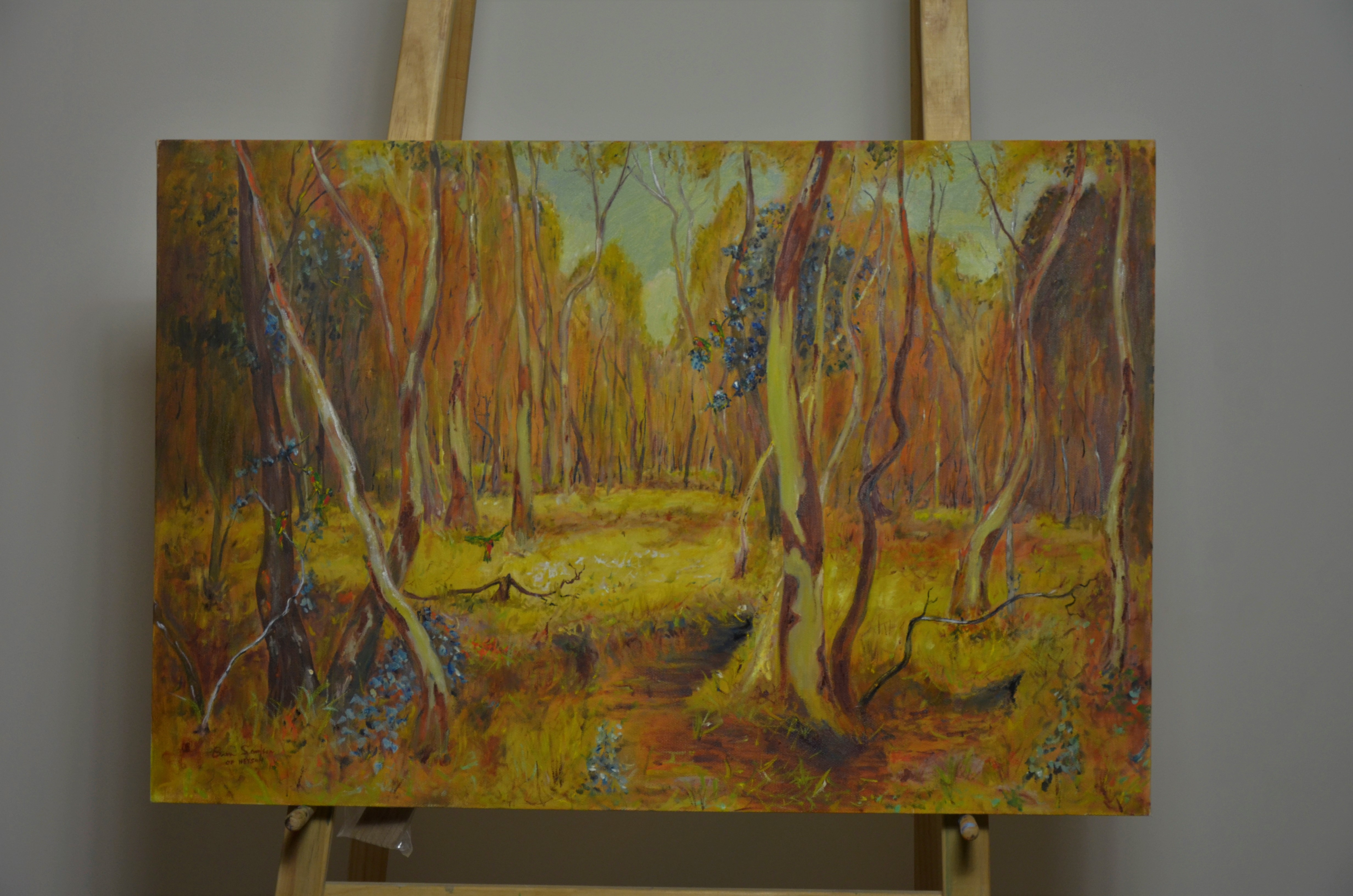
Australian Native Bush.

== Death ==
He died on 16 December 2012.
