= Gene Chiron =

Australian rules footballer

Personal information
- Full name: Gene C. Chiron
- Born: 11 November 1949 (age 76)
- Original team: Hawthorn Districts
- Height: 179 cm (5 ft 10 in)
- Weight: 80 kg (176 lb)
- Position: Half-back

Playing career^{1}
Years	Club	Games (Goals)
1969–1973	Hawthorn (VFL)	37 (1)
1974–1975	Central District (SANFL)	31 (–)
- ^{1} Playing statistics correct to the end of 1975.

Gene Chiron (born 11 November 1949) is a former Australian rules footballer who played with Hawthorn in the Victorian Football League (VFL) and Central District in the South Australian National Football League (SANFL).

== Career ==
Chiron was a defender, recruited locally from Hawthorn Districts. He played night matches for Hawthorn in 1968, before making his senior debut in the 1969 VFL season. In five seasons for Hawthorn, from 1969 to 1973, Chiron made 37 VFL appearances. This included eight games in Hawthorn's premiership winning 1971 season, the last in round 21. He wore the number 36 for most of his career at Hawthorn.

In 1974 he began playing for Central District in the South Australian National Football League. Early in the 1974 season, against North Adelaide, Chiron took part in the first ever SANFL game played at Football Park and had the chance to kick the historic first goal at the venue, but missed.

=== Injury ===
Chiron's SANFL career was ended by a serious injury sustained in a game against West Adelaide at Elizabeth Oval. In the opening quarter, West Adelaide's Ray Hayes collided with Chiron and kneed him in the stomach, splitting his liver. Carried off the ground on a stretcher, Chiron had to have a kidney removed during surgery at Royal Adelaide Hospital.

He remained at Central District for a short period of time, initially as an assistant coach and later a fitness coach.

== Later life ==
Since leaving football, Chiron has worked for Melbourne's Knox City Council as a civil engineer.
