= David Collins (Australian footballer) =

Australian rules footballer

Personal information
- Full name: G. David Collins
- Born: 31 May 1946 (age 80)
- Original team: St Bernard's Old Collegians
- Height: 191 cm (6 ft 3 in)
- Weight: 90 kg (198 lb)
- Position: Centre half-forward

Playing career^{1}
Years	Club	Games (Goals)
1969–70	Essendon	14 (6)
- ^{1} Playing statistics correct to the end of 1970.

Career highlights
- Reserve premiership, Member of Essendon Football Club Match Committee.

David Collins (born 31 May 1946) is a former Australian rules footballer who played with Essendon in the Victorian Football League (VFL).

== Victorian Football League (VFL) ==
Collins won a reserves premiership with Essendon in 1968. He was one of Essendon's best players, kicking three goals in Essendon's win over Richmond 15.7 (97) to 13.14 (92). Collins made his senior debut in 1969, playing 14 games for Essendon to the end of the 1971 season.

== Victorian Football Association (VFA) ==
He played with Williamstown in the Victorian Football Association (VFA) in 1972, and 1973. Collins played a total of 31 games and kicked 26 goals for the VFA Seagulls across the two seasons.

== Essendon District Football League (EDFL) ==
He was captain-coach of Aberfeldie Football Club in the Essendon District Football League in 1974 and 1975, winning a premiership in 1974.

== Essendon Football Club ==
He returned to Essendon as a junior skills coach in 1978.

He was a member of the Essendon Football Club Match Committee for 13 years with premierships in 1984, 1985, and 1993.

He is the Secretary of the Essendon Past Players and Officials Association.
