= Noel Fincher =

Australian rules footballer (1944–2016)

Personal information
- Full name: Noel Ian Fincher
- Born: 10 June 1944
- Died: 11 October 2016 (aged 72)
- Height: 185 cm (6 ft 1 in)
- Weight: 76 kg (168 lb)
- Position: Utility

Playing career^{1}
Years	Club	Games (Goals)
1964–1968	Footscray	46 (7)
1969–1970	North Melbourne	15 (0)
Total		61 (7)
- ^{1} Playing statistics correct to the end of 1970.

Noel Ian Fincher (10 June 1944–11 October 2016) was an Australian rules footballer who played with Footscray and North Melbourne in the Victorian Football League (VFL).

== Early life ==
Noel Ian Fincher was born on 10 June 1944.

== Career ==
Fincher made his club debut for North Melbourne in the 1969 season, aged 24, playing a total of 15 games there before departing at the conclusion of the 1970 VFL season.

== Personal life ==
Fincher died on 11 October 2016, aged 72. North Melbourne paid tribute to Fincher in a statement the following week, on 19 October. Fincher was survived by his wife Lynette, his two sons, Jason and Jarrod, and his four grandchildren, Jake, Kye, Raph, Eli and Gus. His second grandson, Kye (born 2007), was drafted by St Kilda as a Next Generation Academy player at the 2025 AFL national draft.
