= Francis Jackson (footballer) =

Australian rules footballer

Personal information
- Full name: Francis Jackson
- Born: 24 August 1954 (age 72)
- Original team: Power House
- Height: 184 cm (6 ft 0 in)
- Weight: 83 kg (183 lb)

Playing career^{1}
Years	Club	Games (Goals)
1973–1974	Richmond	6 (0)
1975–1983	South Melbourne/Sydney	100 (9)
Total		106 (9)
- ^{1} Playing statistics correct to the end of 1983.

Francis Jackson (born 24 August 1954) is a former Australian rules footballer who played with Richmond and South Melbourne/Sydney in the Victorian Football League (VFL).

A defender, Jackson came to Richmond from Victorian Amateur Football Association club Power House. He made six appearances for Richmond, over two seasons, then got traded to South Melbourne, along with Graham Teasdale and Brian Roberts (for John Pitura). His best season came in 1981 when he earned 11 Brownlow Medal votes. The club relocated to Sydney the following season but Jackson didn't make a single appearance that year, due to a knee injury. He played 15 games in 1983 and brought up his 100th Swans appearance in the penultimate round of the season, against his former club Richmond.

Jackson was coach of Sandringham in 1987.

He now works back at Richmond Football Club, as their Recruitment Manager, a job he has held since 2005.
