= John Bonney =

Australian rules footballer (1946–2022)

Personal information
- Full name: Daryl John Bonney
- Born: 21 May 1946; Burnie, Tasmania
- Died: 20 February 2022 (aged 75); Cobden, Victoria
- Original team: Cooee (NWFU)
- Height: 177 cm (5 ft 10 in)
- Weight: 71.5 kg (158 lb)

Playing career^{1}
Years	Club	Games (Goals)
1967–69, 1971–73, 1976	St Kilda	87 (79)
- ^{1} Playing statistics correct to the end of 1976.

Daryl John Bonney (21 May 1946 – 20 February 2022) was an Australian rules footballer who played with St Kilda.

A wingman recruited from the small Tasmanian club Cooee, Bonney played in the St Kilda grand final team of 1971. As an aspiring young player, he rang Collingwood hoping for a game, but was turned away. Wanting to play with a strong team, he then called St Kilda (which played in the 1966 VFL Grand Final), was accepted and played from the bench in the first game. In a career that was riddled with injuries, his nose was broken nine times, and he had a near fatal injury in which his spleen was punctured by a kick to the stomach. He missed the 1970 and 1974 VFL seasons due to family reasons and the 1972 VFL season due to a knee injury.

Bonney died in Cobden, Victoria, on 20 February 2022 at the age of 75.
