= Des Meagher =

Australian rules footballer and coach

Personal information
- Full name: Desmond Meagher
- Born: 7 March 1944
- Died: 9 March 2011 (aged 67)
- Original team: Old Xaverians
- Height: 185 cm (6 ft 1 in)
- Weight: 86 kg (190 lb)

Playing career^{1}
Years	Club	Games (Goals)
1966–1976	Hawthorn	198 (96)
- ^{1} Playing statistics correct to the end of 1976.

Career highlights
- VFL premiership player: 1971

Desmond Meagher (7 March 1944 – 9 March 2011) was an Australian rules footballer who played with Hawthorn in the Victorian Football League (VFL).

== Football career ==
Meagher was a left-footed wingman, recruited to Hawthorn from Old Xaverians. He debuted for Hawthorn in 1966 and such was his swift rise that by the following season he was playing interstate football for Victoria. In 1971 he played in the Hawthorn's Premiership-winning side against St Kilda. He played in the 1975 Grand Final as a reserve. He retired at the end of 1976 and accepted a position as coach of Kilsyth.

He was coach of Hawthorn's reserves team which consistently played finals during the 1980s and won a Premiership in 1985.

Meagher is credited by Hawthorn legend Dermott Brereton as having unwittingly bestowed Brereton with the nickname "The Kid" during a Hawthorn reserves match when Brereton was around 16 years of age.

== Death ==
Meagher suffered a stroke and died on 9 March 2011, two days after his 67th birthday.

== Honours and achievements ==
Hawthorn

- VFL premiership player: 1971
- 2× Minor premiership: 1971, 1975

Individual

- Hawthorn life member
