= Ken Beck =

Australian rules footballer (1940–2025)

Personal information
- Born: 4 August 1940
- Died: 6 April 2025 (aged 84)
- Original team: Stawell (WFL)
- Height: 200 cm (6 ft 7 in)
- Weight: 89 kg (196 lb)

Playing career
Years	Club	Games (Goals)
1962–1972	Hawthorn	143 (23)
1973–1974	Dandenong	17 (1)
1975, 1976-1977	Oakleigh	23 (8)
1975	Prahran	1 (1)
Total		184 (33)

Career highlights
- VFL premiership player: 1971

Ken Beck (4 August 1940 – 6 April 2025) was an Australian rules footballer who played with Hawthorn FC in the Victorian Football League (VFL).

Originally from Stawell FC, Beck was a tall ruckman and made his league debut in 1962. He was a regular member of the team during the 1960s and was a reserve in their 1971 premiership side.

1972 was Beck's last season and he was elected captain of the Reserves. His last game was the VFL Reserves Grand Final in which his side won the Premiership.

== After VFL ==
Beck accepted a two-year contract to captain-coach Dandenong in the VFA for the 1973 and 1974 seasons. He later played for Prahran and Oakleigh. In 1978 he was playing in the Mornington Peninsula League with Seaford. He won that league's Best & Fairest in 1978.

Beck died on 6 April 2025, at the age of 84.

== Honours and achievements ==
Hawthorn

- VFL premiership player: 1971
- 2× Minor premiership: 1963, 1971

Individual

- Victoria Australian rules football team: 1966
- Hawthorn life member

== Sources ==
- Holmesby, Russell and Main, Jim (2007). The Encyclopedia of AFL Footballers. 7th ed. Melbourne: Bas Publishing.
