= Barry Besanko =

Australian rules footballer and sprinter

Personal information
- Full name: Barry D. Besanko
- Born: 15 August 1956 (age 70)
- Original team: Mentone
- Height: 179 cm (5 ft 10 in)
- Weight: 76 kg (168 lb)

Playing career^{1}
Years	Club	Games (Goals)
1980	Essendon	3 (3)
- ^{1} Playing statistics correct to the end of 1980.

Barry Besanko (born 15 August 1956) is a former Australian sprinter and Australian rules footballer who played with Essendon in the Victorian Football League (VFL).

Besanko was a junior nationals hurdles champion and competed in many athletics events before joining Essendon. In the Australian Track & Field Championships, his best performances included a second-place finish in the 100 metres in 1976-77 and four successive top three finishes in the 200m, finishing second in 1978–79. He was also a member of the Victorian team that won the 4 x 100 metres relay final in 1977–78, along with Fred Lehmann, Peter Van Miltenburg and Colin McQueen. Internationally, Besanko represented Oceania at the 1977 IAAF World Cup in West Germany and the 1979 IAAF World Cup in Canada. At both World Cups he was a finalist in the 4 x 100 metres relays, placing seventh each time. His best individual performance at a World Cup came in 1979, when he made the 200 metres final and finished eighth.

During this time, Besanko also played Under 19s and reserves football for Melbourne. Not surprisingly given his speed, Besanko was a wingman. He made three appearances for Essendon, all in the 1980 VFL season. His elder brother Neil Besanko also played for the club.

In 1983 he captain-coached Dingley but returned to Essendon the following year, to join their coaching staff. He was off again in 1986, to coach Rye, a position he held for two years. He then went to St Kilda, where he was a fitness adviser.
