= Barry Pascoe =

Australian rules footballer

Personal information
- Full name: Barry George Pascoe
- Born: 23 January 1944
- Died: 23 June 2007 (aged 63)
- Original team: North Adelaide
- Height: 183 cm (6 ft 0 in)
- Weight: 83 kg (183 lb)
- Position: Ruck-rover

Playing career^{1}
Years	Club	Games (Goals)
1967	North Melbourne	15 (1)
1968–70	St Kilda	41 (35)
Total		56 (36)
- ^{1} Playing statistics correct to the end of 1970.

Barry George Pascoe (23 January 1944 – 23 June 2007) was an Australian rules footballer who played with North Melbourne and St Kilda in the Victorian Football League (VFL).

Pascoe started his career at North Adelaide in the SANFL, amassing 25 games as a ruck-rover. He spent 12 months on the sidelines in 1966 in order to be cleared to join his brother Bob at North Melbourne.

After just one season, he crossed to St Kilda to again play beside his brother, who had left following a pay dispute. He had a good first season in 1968, playing 20 games and finishing as the club's fourth best vote getter in the Brownlow Medal count. Despite being used as a ruck-over he became known for his ability to find goals and the following season kicked 13 goals for the second successive year. A cruciate ligament injury to his knee ended his career in 1970.
