= Stephen Rae (footballer) =

Australian rules footballer

Personal information
- Born: 30 April 1952 (age 74)
- Original team: East Sandringham
- Height: 180 cm (5 ft 11 in)
- Weight: 84 kg (185 lb)

Playing career^{1}
Years	Club	Games (Goals)
1969–1973	St Kilda	55 (38)
1973–1974	Richmond	20 (11)
Total		75 (49)
- ^{1} Playing statistics correct to the end of 1974.

Career highlights
- 1973 VFL Premiership player

Stephen Rae (born 30 April 1952) is a former Australian rules footballer who played with St Kilda and Richmond in the Victorian Football League during the 1970s.

Aged just 17 when he debuted for St Kilda in 1969, Rae was a half forward and played in the Saints' losing 1971 VFL Grand Final team.

In 1973 he asked to be cleared to Richmond where his friend, Ian Stewart played, the club refused and after more tension with the coach he crossed to Richmond during the 1973 season and played in their premiership side that year before persistent injuries to his knees and hands caused his retirement from VFL football in 1974.

Rae then turned to umpiring, first in the country before moving to umpiring the VFL Under 19s. He then returned to playing football and coaching for clubs throughout Victoria and was the Vice-President of the Hampden Football League in 1990.

He had a business in which he tuned pianos.
