= Bob Pascoe =

Australian rules footballer

Personal information
- Full name: Robert Henry Pascoe
- Born: 15 February 1941 (age 85)
- Original team: North Adelaide
- Height: 191 cm (6 ft 3 in)
- Weight: 102 kg (225 lb)
- Position: Ruckman

Playing career^{1}
Years	Club	Games (Goals)
1964–67	North Melbourne	53 (37)
1968–70	St Kilda	36 (32)
Total		89 (69)
- ^{1} Playing statistics correct to the end of 1970.

Robert Henry Pascoe (born 15 February 1941) is a former Australian rules footballer who played with North Melbourne and St Kilda in the Victorian Football League (VFL).

Pascoe's SANFL career with North Adelaide encompassed five seasons from 1959 to 1963, playing 97 games. He was a member of their 1960 premiership team and two years later earned selection in South Australian state side but had to sit out due to a suspension.

A ruckman, he joined North Melbourne in 1964 and missed just one game in his debut season. By 1966 he was performing well enough to be picked to represent the VFL in the Hobart Carnival but again didn't make the trip, this time due to a broken leg. The following year he was joined in the ruck by his brother Barry and finished third in North Melbourne's 'Best and Fairest'. After a dispute with club officials over his payments, Pascoe left the club at the end of the 1967 VFL season and transferred to St Kilda.

Having played the first nine games in 1968, Pascoe missed the rest of the season through a twelve-week suspension. He however performed well for St Kilda over the next two years.

In 1971, Pascoe joined Burnie in the North West Football Union as captain-coach. He was in charge of the Tasmanian club for three seasons and managed 44 games. He also captained the Tasmanian interstate team against the VFL in 1973.
