= John Sudholz =

Australian rules footballer

Personal information
- Born: 1 May 1946 (age 80)
- Original team: Rupanyup (WFL)
- Height: 192 cm (6 ft 4 in)
- Weight: 99 kg (218 lb)

Playing career^{1}
Years	Club	Games (Goals)
1966–1971	South Melbourne	86 (176)
- ^{1} Playing statistics correct to the end of 1971.

John Sudholz (born 1 May 1946) is a former Australian rules footballer who played with South Melbourne in the VFL.

Sudholz was a strongly built full-forward from the Victorian town of Rupanyup and made his debut for South Melbourne in 1966. He topped the club's goal kicking for four successive seasons from 1967 to 1970. His best season tally was 60 goals in 1970 in what was a good year for forwards, with three of them kicking over 100: Hudson, McKenna and Jesaulenko.
