= John Manzie =

Australian rules footballer

Personal information
- Full name: John Manzie
- Born: 8 December 1947 (age 78)
- Original team: East Sandringham
- Height: 179 cm (70 in)
- Weight: 78 kg (172 lb)
- Position: Wingman

Playing career^{1}
Years	Club	Games (Goals)
1967–1968, 1970–1975	St Kilda	117 (51)
- ^{1} Playing statistics correct to the end of 1975.

John Manzie (born 8 December 1947) is a former Australian rules footballer who played with St Kilda in the Victorian Football League (VFL) during the late 1960s and early 1970s.

As part of a strong St Kilda outfit, Manzie participated in nine finals, including the losing 1971 VFL Grand Final. He was used mainly as a wingman at St Kilda and retired after the 1975 season.
