= Jon Lilley =

Australian rules footballer (1947–2025)

Personal information
- Full name: Jonathan Karl Lilley
- Born: 21 April 1947
- Died: 21 October 2025 (aged 78)
- Original team: Old Xaverians (VAFA)
- Height: 183 cm (6 ft 0 in)
- Weight: 86 kg (190 lb)

Playing career
Years	Club	Games (Goals)
1967–71	St Kilda	49 (2)

Jonathan Karl Lilley (21 April 1947 – 21 October 2025) was an Australian rules footballer who played with St Kilda in the Victorian Football League (VFL).

Lilley died on 21 October 2025, at the age of 78.
