= Noel Mewett =

Australian rules footballer

Personal information
- Full name: Noel Mewett
- Born: 2 April 1949 (age 77)
- Original team: Hobart (TFL)

Playing career^{1}
| Years | Club | Games (Goals) |
| 1969 | Carlton | 5 (3) |
- ^{1} Playing statistics correct to the end of 1969.

Noel Mewett (born 2 April 1949) is a former Australian rules footballer who played with Carlton in the Victorian Football League (VFL).
