= Richard Radziminski =

Australian rules footballer

Personal information
- Full name: Richard Radziminski
- Born: 13 August 1951 (age 75)
- Height: 180 cm (5 ft 11 in)
- Weight: 76 kg (168 lb)

Playing career^{1}
Years	Club	Games (Goals)
1969–71	Footscray	14 (0)
- ^{1} Playing statistics correct to the end of 1971.

Richard Radziminski (born 13 August 1951) is a former Australian rules footballer who played with Footscray in the Victorian Football League (VFL).
