= Mark Mitchell (footballer) =

Australian rules footballer (born 1951)

Personal information
- Born: 4 September 1951 (age 75)
- Height: 182 cm (6 ft 0 in)
- Weight: 74.5 kg (164 lb)

Playing career^{1}
Years	Club	Games (Goals)
1969	Melbourne	6 (2)
- ^{1} Playing statistics correct to the end of 1969.

Mark Mitchell (born 4 September 1951) is a former Australian rules footballer who played with Melbourne in the Victorian Football League (VFL).
