= Bob Keddie =

Australian rules footballer (born 1946)

Personal information
- Full name: Robert Mackay Keddie
- Born: 10 May 1946 (age 80); Melbourne
- Original team: University High Old Boys VAFA
- Height: 183 cm (6 ft 0 in)
- Weight: 87 kg (192 lb)
- Position: Centre/Half/FF

Playing career^{1}
Years	Club	Games (Goals)
1965–72	Hawthorn (VFL)	132 (195)
1973	West Adelaide (SANFL)	18 (14)
1974–76	South Adelaide (SANFL)	53 (71)
1977	Glenelg (SANFL)	7 (2)
Total		210 (282)

Coaching career
Years	Club	Games (W–L–D)
1973	West Adelaide (SANFL)	21 (3–17–1)
- ^{1} Playing statistics correct to the end of 1977.

Career highlights
- VFL premiership player: 1971; 2× J.J. Dennis Memorial Trophy: 1967, 1969; All-Australian team: 1969; Steve Hamra Medal 1973; South Adelaide Football Club best and fairest: 1975; Member of Gaelic Football Team on Tour to Ireland and USA 1967

Robert Mackay Keddie (born 10 May 1946) is a former Australian rules footballer who played for Hawthorn in the Victorian Football League (VFL) and West Adelaide, South Adelaide and Glenelg in the South Australian National Football League (SANFL).

== Career ==
Bob Keddie made his debut for Hawthorn in 1965 and in subsequent seasons became a highly effective half forward flanker for the club. He was Hawthorn's Best & Fairest winner in 1967 and 1969 and for his performances at the 1969 Adelaide Carnival for Victoria he earned All Australian selection. In 1967 Keddie was selected in the first Australian team to tour Ireland and the USA to play Gaelic Football.

During the 1970 VFL season Keddie kicked 47 goals. He was overshadowed, however, by teammate Peter Hudson who kicked 146 goals.

In the 1971 VFL Grand Final against St Kilda, Hawthorn were down by 21 points when Keddie was pushed to full forward (and Hudson to centre half forward). The Hawks went on to win the game by seven points, with Keddie kicking four final-quarter goals and gaining hero status.

Keddie worked as a physical education teacher in the Victorian state school system at Belle Vue State School in his early teaching. He went on to teach and coach school teams up to year 12.

Keddie left Hawthorn at the end of the 1972 VFL season and became captain and coach of West Adelaide. He played 18 games, kicking 14 goals and winning The Bloods Best & Fairest before moving on to South Adelaide as captain in 1974, playing 53 games, kicking 71 goals and winning South's best and fairest award in 1975. In 1977, Keddie played a final season with Glenelg, playing seven games and kicking two goals. He also played five games for South Australia; three against Victoria and one each against Western Australia and Tasmania, kicking four goals.

Keddie's younger brother Richard played reserves football for Hawthorn.

== Post playing ==
In 1979, Keddie became the state development manager for the Junior Football Council of Victoria under Ray Allsop (governed by the VFL and Victorian State Government), setting up parent groups throughout Victoria to initiate what is now known as Auskick. This was supported by a development officer (player) from each of the VFL clubs. Keddie was appointed as an assistant coach to Allan Jeans in 1980 and in 1981 became the full-time development manager for the Hawthorn Football Club and coached the Hawthorn Under 19 team to two finals before returning to teaching at Wesley College in 1984.

In 1984, Keddie was appointed as senior coach at Victorian Football Association (VFA) club Sandringham and coached the Zebras to the 1985 flag. In 1987, he was appointed as David Parkins' senior assistant coach before returning to Sandringham in 1988.

Keddie continued his teaching career into the 1980s at Wesley College until 1987. In 1991–93, Keddie coached South Launceston Football Club in the Tasmanian Football League. This is where his only child, Alexandra Keddie (born 1992), was born. He now resides back in Melbourne and is currently retired but does some voluntary coaching work and player mentoring at the Frankston Football Club.

== Sources ==
- Holmesby, Russell and Main, Jim (2007). The Encyclopedia of AFL Footballers. 7th ed. Melbourne: Bas Publishing.
