= Steve Arnott =

Australian rules footballer

Personal information
- Born: 24 January 1949 (age 77)
- Original team: Seaford United
- Height: 183 cm (6 ft 0 in)
- Weight: 79 kg (174 lb)

Playing career^{1}
Years	Club	Games (Goals)
1969	Melbourne	1 (0)
- ^{1} Playing statistics correct to the end of 1969.

Steve Arnott (born 24 January 1949) is a former Australian rules footballer who played with Melbourne in the Victorian Football League (VFL).
