= Russell Colcott =

Australian rules footballer

Personal information
- Born: 10 September 1949 (age 77)
- Original team: Bentleigh
- Height: 180 cm (5 ft 11 in)
- Weight: 73 kg (161 lb)

Playing career^{1}
Years	Club	Games (Goals)
1969–71	Melbourne	15 (18)
- ^{1} Playing statistics correct to the end of 1971.

Russell Colcott (born 10 September 1949) is a former Australian rules footballer who played with Melbourne in the Victorian Football League (VFL).
