= Steven Lawrence =

Australian rules footballer, born 1976

Personal information
- Born: 19 May 1976 (age 50)
- Original team: Southport (QLD)
- Debut: Round 3, 16 April 1995, Brisbane Bears vs. Sydney Swans, at Gabba

Playing career^{1}
Years	Club	Games (Goals)
1995–1996	Brisbane Bears	13 (1)
1997–2000	Brisbane Lions	68 (42)
2001–2003	St Kilda	39 (17)
Total		120 (60)
- ^{1} Playing statistics correct to the end of 2003.

Career highlights
- AFL Rising Star nominee 1995

Steven James Lawrence (born 19 May 1976) is a former Australian rules footballer. He is the son of St Kilda star Barry Lawrence.

== St Kilda career ==
Lawrence was traded to St Kilda in the 2000 AFL draft, and was part of some aggressive recruiting by the Saints in that season. He was sacked from the Saints in 2003 after a drink-driving incident.
