= Ray Wilson (Australian rules footballer) =

Australian rules footballer

Personal information
- Full name: Raymond Ian Wilson
- Born: 21 January 1945 (age 81)
- Original team: University Blacks
- Height: 180 cm (5 ft 11 in)
- Weight: 75 kg (165 lb)

Playing career^{1}
Years	Club	Games (Goals)
1966–1972	Hawthorn	105 (32)
- ^{1} Playing statistics correct to the end of 1972.

Career highlights
- VFL premiership plauyer: 1971; J.J. Dennis Memorial Trophy: 1966

Raymond Ian Wilson OAM (born 21 January 1945) is a former Australian rules footballer who played for Hawthorn in the Victorian Football League (VFL).

Wilson, a wingman, made his debut for Hawthorn in 1966 and won that season's best and fairest award. He played on the interchange bench in Hawthorn's 1971 Grand Final win over St Kilda.

Before being recruited by Hawthorn he had captained University Blacks in the Victorian Amateur Football Association to the B Grade premiership in 1964 and the A Grade premiership the following year.

His son, Tony Wilson, is a writer, broadcaster and compere. In 2017 he was awarded the Order of Australia Medal for services to community and sport.
