= Ray Sampson =

Australian rules footballer

Personal information
- Full name: Ray Sampson
- Born: 12 November 1949 (age 76)
- Original team: East Sandringham
- Height: 184 cm (6 ft 0 in)
- Weight: 89 kg (196 lb)

Playing career^{1}
Years	Club	Games (Goals)
1969	Melbourne	1 (0)
- ^{1} Playing statistics correct to the end of 1969.

Ray Sampson (born 12 November 1949) is a former Australian rules footballer who played with Melbourne in the Victorian Football League (VFL).

His older brother Brian Sampson also played in the VFL for Essendon.
