= Richard Luke =

Australian rules footballer

Personal information
- Full name: Richard Luke
- Born: 17 May 1948
- Died: 27 August 2014 (aged 66)
- Original team: Spotswood
- Height: 183 cm (6 ft 0 in)
- Weight: 80 kg (176 lb)

Playing career^{1}
Years	Club	Games (Goals)
1968–70	South Melbourne	39 (16)
- ^{1} Playing statistics correct to the end of 1970.

Richard Luke (17 May 1948 – 27 August 2014) was an Australian rules footballer who played with South Melbourne in the Victorian Football League (VFL).
