= Ken Luscombe =

Australian rules footballer

Personal information
- Full name: Ken Luscombe
- Born: 6 February 1951 (age 75)
- Height: 173 cm (5 ft 8 in)
- Weight: 76 kg (168 lb)

Playing career^{1}
Years	Club	Games (Goals)
1969	South Melbourne	7 (0)
- ^{1} Playing statistics correct to the end of 1969.

Ken Luscombe (born 6 February 1951) is a former Australian rules footballer who played with South Melbourne in the Victorian Football League (VFL).
