= Les Hawken =

Australian rules footballer

Personal information
- Born: 9 June 1949 (age 77)
- Original team: Trafalgar
- Height: 192 cm (6 ft 4 in)
- Weight: 99 kg (218 lb)

Playing career^{1}
Years	Club	Games (Goals)
1970–1974	Hawthorn	65 (3)
- ^{1} Playing statistics correct to the end of 1974.

Career highlights
- 1971 VFL Premiership player

Les Hawken (born 9 June 1949) is a former Australian rules footballer who played with Hawthorn in the VFL during the early 1970s.

Hawken was a back pocket specialist and debuted for Hawthorn in 1970. He was a member of their 1971 premiership team. After leaving the Hawks following the 1974 season he finished his career in Tasmania with the Cooee Football Club.
