= John Letcher (footballer) =

Australian rules footballer

Personal information
- Born: 26 November 1950 (age 75)
- Original team: Parkdale
- Height: 189 cm (6 ft 2 in)
- Weight: 95.5 kg (211 lb)

Playing career^{1}
Years	Club	Games (Goals)
1969–70, 1972	Melbourne	25 (2)
- ^{1} Playing statistics correct to the end of 1972.

John Letcher (born 26 November 1950) is a former Australian rules footballer who played with Melbourne in the Victorian Football League (VFL).
