= Reg Gleeson =

Australian rules footballer

Personal information
- Full name: Reg Gleeson
- Born: 1 May 1950 (age 76); Albury
- Original team: Osborne
- Height: 183 cm (6 ft 0 in)
- Weight: 82.5 kg (182 lb)
- Position: Defence

Playing career^{1}
Years	Club	Games (Goals)
1970–76	South Melbourne	128 (11)
- ^{1} Playing statistics correct to the end of 1976.

Reg Gleeson (born 1 May 1950, full name Reginald Gleeson) is a former Australian rules footballer who played with South Melbourne in the Victorian Football League (VFL) between 1970 and 1976.

He joined South Melbourne in 1969 and made his senior VFL debut in 1970, shortly before his 20th birthday. His shirt number was 27 and he initially played as a wingman before going becoming a half back flanker. Over the course of his career with South Melbourne he played 128 games and scored 11 goals. He played his last match with South Melbourne in 1976, at the age of 26.

Gleeson worked in the transport industry throughout his football playing career.
