= Neil Besanko =

Australian rules footballer

Personal information
- Born: 28 April 1951 (age 75)
- Original team: Mentone
- Height: 187 cm (6 ft 2 in)
- Weight: 88 kg (194 lb)

Playing career^{1}
Years	Club	Games (Goals)
1968–1977	St Kilda	149 (4)
1978–1981	Essendon	35 (1)
Total		184 (5)
- ^{1} Playing statistics correct to the end of 1981.

Neil Besanko (born 28 April 1951) is a former Australian rules footballer who played for St Kilda and Essendon in the Victorian Football League (VFL).

Besanko made his VFL debut as a 17 year in 1968 and was a regular fixture in the St Kilda defence during the 1970s. Besanko played in the 1971 VFL Grand Final with St Kilda.

In 1978 he moved on to Essendon and he was joined there by his brother Barry in the 1980 season.

After 184 VFL games, Besanko moved to South Australia to play with Central Districts.

Nicknamed 'Racehorse' as he was also a professional sprinter and he won the 1971 and 1972 Burramine Gift and finished second in the 1971 Bendigo 1000.
