= Jeff Bates (footballer) =

Australian rules footballer

Personal information
- Full name: Jeffrey Keith Bates
- Nickname: Jeff Bates
- Born: 16 July 1950 (age 76)
- Original team: Healesville

Playing career^{1}
Years	Club	Games (Goals)
1969–71	Geelong	6 (1)
- ^{1} Playing statistics correct to the end of 1971.

Jeffrey Keith Bates (born 16 July 1950) is a former Australian rules footballer who played for Geelong in the Victorian Football League (now known as the Australian Football League).
