= Haydn McAuliffe =

Australian rules footballer (born 1946)

Personal information
- Full name: Haydn McAuliffe
- Born: 15 May 1946 (age 80)
- Original team: Spotswood
- Height: 175 cm (5 ft 9 in)
- Weight: 76 kg (168 lb)
- Position: Rover

Playing career^{1}
Years	Club	Games (Goals)
1965–73	South Melbourne	105 (104)
- ^{1} Playing statistics correct to the end of 1973.

Haydn McAuliffe (born 15 May 1946) is a former Australian rules footballer who played with South Melbourne in the Victorian Football League (VFL).
