= Russell Cook (footballer) =

Australian sportsman

Personal information
- Full name: Russell Frederick Cook
- Born: 23 September 1947 (age 79); South Melbourne, Victoria
- Original team: South Melbourne Under 19s
- Height: 185 cm (6 ft 1 in)
- Weight: 85 kg (187 lb)

Playing career^{1}
Years	Club	Games (Goals)
1966–1975	South Melbourne	164 (54)
- ^{1} Playing statistics correct to the end of 1975.

Russell Frederick Cook (born 23 September 1947) is a former Australian rules footballer who played with South Melbourne in the VFL. He won the Bob Skilton Medal in 1972.

He also played cricket for Victoria and in seven first-class games took 16 wickets as a left-arm fast-medium pace bowler.

== See also ==
- List of Victoria first-class cricketers
