= Rob Dowsing =

Australian rules footballer

Personal information
- Full name: Rob Dowsing
- Born: 3 September 1947 (age 79)
- Original team: Burwood United
- Height: 173 cm (5 ft 8 in)
- Weight: 67 kg (148 lb)

Playing career^{1}
Years	Club	Games (Goals)
1966–68	Melbourne	16 (17)
1969	South Melbourne	4 (6)
Total		20 (23)
- ^{1} Playing statistics correct to the end of 1969.

Rob Dowsing (born 3 September 1947) is a former Australian rules footballer who played with Melbourne and South Melbourne in the Victorian Football League (VFL).
