= Tad Joniec =

Australian rules footballer

Personal information
- Full name: Tad Joniec
- Born: 27 December 1950 (age 75)
- Original team: Yarraville Socials
- Height: 187 cm (6 ft 2 in)
- Weight: 87 kg (192 lb)

Playing career^{1}
Years	Club	Games (Goals)
1969, 1971	Footscray	2 (1)
- ^{1} Playing statistics correct to the end of 1971.

Tad Joniec (born 27 December 1950) is a former Australian rules footballer who played with Footscray in the Victorian Football League (VFL).
