= Keith Baskin =

Australian rules footballer

Personal information
- Full name: Keith Barrie Baskin
- Born: 15 December 1945 (age 80); Liverpool, England
- Original team: Moorabbin (VFA)
- Height: 183 cm (6 ft 0 in)
- Weight: 80 kg (176 lb)

Playing career^{1}
Years	Club	Games (Goals)
1964, 1967–1973	South Melbourne	75 (78)
- ^{1} Playing statistics correct to the end of 1973.

Keith Barrie Baskin (born 15 December 1945) is a former Australian rules footballer who represented South Melbourne in the Victorian Football League (VFL) during the 1960s and 1970s. He is one of few Jewish Australian rules footballers to have played at the top level.

The centreman crossed to South Melbourne in 1964 after Moorabbin was suspended by the Victorian Football Association (VFA). He initially moved to Sandringham, before deciding to try to break into league ranks with South. He stayed with South Melbourne for one season, before going to Myrtleford in the Ovens & Murray Football League.

He returned to South in 1967 and came third in the best and fairest count the following season.

In 1974 he spent a season as coach of VFA club Mordialloc.
