= Daryl Powell (Australian footballer) =

Australian rules footballer

Personal information
- Full name: Daryl Powell
- Born: 31 May 1952 (age 74)
- Original team: Woodend
- Height: 179 cm (5 ft 10 in)
- Weight: 70 kg (11 st 0 lb)

Playing career^{1}
| Years | Club | Games (Goals) |
| 1969 | Melbourne | 2 (0) |
- ^{1} Playing statistics correct to the end of 1969.

Daryl Powell (born 31 May 1952) is a former Australian rules footballer who played with Melbourne in the Victorian Football League (VFL).
