= Gary Crouch =

Australian rules footballer and coach

Personal information
- Full name: Gary Charles Crouch
- Born: 27 September 1946 (age 80)
- Original team: University Blacks
- Height: 184 cm (6 ft 0 in)
- Weight: 73 kg (161 lb)
- Position: Half back flank center

Playing career^{1}
Years	Club	Games (Goals)
1969–70	Essendon	9 (1)
	Subiaco	70 (1)
- ^{1} Playing statistics correct to the end of 1970.

Gary Crouch (born 27 September 1946) is a former Australian rules footballer who played with Essendon in the Victorian Football League (VFL). After leaving Essendon, Crouch played for Rochester for one season before moving to Western Australia and joining Subiaco in the West Australian Football League (WAFL). He spent four seasons with Subiaco, playing on half back flank in the 1973 WAFL winning Grand Final team. He then moved back to Victoria to the Bendigo Football League (BFL). Crouch played one season with South Bendigo and was captain-coach of Sandhurst as well as regularly representing and captain of the BFL in interleague matches.
