= Norm Mitchell =

Australian rules footballer

Personal information
- Full name: Norman Mitchell
- Born: 30 July 1949 (age 77)
- Original team: North Footscray
- Height: 178 cm (5 ft 10 in)
- Weight: 76 kg (168 lb)

Playing career^{1}
Years	Club	Games (Goals)
1969	Footscray	5 (1)
- ^{1} Playing statistics correct to the end of 1969.

Norm Mitchell (born 30 July 1949) is a former Australian rules footballer who played with Footscray in the Victorian Football League (VFL).
