= Trevor Rollinson =

Australian rules footballer

Personal information
- Born: 17 July 1947 (age 79)
- Original team: Shepparton
- Height: 180 cm (5 ft 11 in)
- Weight: 74 kg (163 lb)

Playing career^{1}
Years	Club	Games (Goals)
1969–73	Melbourne	49 (1)
- ^{1} Playing statistics correct to the end of 1973.

Trevor Rollinson (born 17 July 1947) is a former Australian rules footballer who played with Melbourne in the Victorian Football League (VFL).
