= Bruce Davidson (footballer) =

Australian rules footballer

Personal information
- Full name: Bruce Davidson
- Born: 25 June 1950 (age 76)
- Original team: Warragul
- Height: 179 cm (5 ft 10 in)
- Weight: 73 kg (161 lb)

Playing career^{1}
Years	Club	Games (Goals)
1969	Footscray	3 (0)
- ^{1} Playing statistics correct to the end of 1969.

Bruce Davidson (born 25 June 1950) is a former Australian rules footballer who played with Footscray in the Victorian Football League (VFL).
