= Ian Owen =

Australian rules footballer

Personal information
- Born: 21 July 1948 (age 78)
- Original team: Echuca East
- Height: 188 cm (6 ft 2 in)
- Weight: 82.5 kg (182 lb)

Playing career^{1}
Years	Club	Games (Goals)
1969–1972	Richmond	33 (0)
- ^{1} Playing statistics correct to the end of 1972.

Career highlights
- Richmond Premiership Player 1969; Richmond Reserves Captain 1972; Richmond Reserves Premiership Player 1971; Richmond Under 19s Premiership Player 1967

Ian Owen (born 21 July 1948) is a former Australian rules football player who played in the VFL between 1969 and 1972 for the Richmond Football Club.

Owen played in the 1966 senior premiership side for Echuca East, three premiership sides at Richmond (Under 19s, Seniors then Reserves) and in three senior premiership teams for Port Melbourne in the VFA.

In the 1969 Grand Final, Owen's Richmond guernsey carried the number 52. There is no record of any Grand Final player carrying a larger number until Adelaide's Shaun Rehn in 1997 and 1998.
