= David McLeish (Australian footballer) =

Australian rules footballer

Personal information
- Born: 21 February 1950 (age 76)
- Original team: Kerang
- Height: 180 cm (5 ft 11 in)
- Weight: 76 kg (168 lb)
- Positions: wing, half back flank

Playing career^{1}
Years	Club	Games (Goals)
1966–1968	Kerang	43 (?)
1969–1980	South Melbourne	213 (22)
1981–1988	Wodonga	144 (63)
- ^{1} Playing statistics correct to the end of 1988.

Career highlights
- Kerang FC best & fairest: 1968; 1970 VFL 1st Semi & 1977 VFL Elimination Finals; Wodonga FC premierships: 1981 & 1987; Sydney Swans Hall of Fame Inductee: 2019

David McLeish (born 21 February 1950) is a former Australian rules footballer who played for South Melbourne in the VFL during the 1970s.

McLeish was recruited from Kerang Football Club in the Northern District Football League in 1969.

McLeish played in only two VFL finals, in 1970 and 1977, but South Melbourne lost both finals.

McLeish was captain-coach of Wodonga in 1981 when they won the Ovens & Murray Football League premiership, played for Wodonga when runners up in 1984 and played in their 1987 premiership.

In September 1988, McLeish played his 400th and last senior football match in an Ovens & Murray Football League preliminary final after commencing his senior football career with Kerang.

McLeish was inducted into Sydney Swans Hall of Fame in 2019.
