= Stuart Bennett (footballer) =

Australian rules footballer

Personal information
- Full name: Stuart Bennett
- Born: 4 October 1946 (age 80)
- Original team: Longernon Agricultural College
- Height: 197 cm (6 ft 6 in)
- Weight: 87 kg (192 lb)
- Position: Ruck

Playing career^{1}
Years	Club	Games (Goals)
1967–70	South Melbourne	53 (25)
- ^{1} Playing statistics correct to the end of 1970.

Stuart Bennett (born 4 October 1946) is a former Australian rules footballer who played with South Melbourne in the Victorian Football League (VFL).
