= Gary Colling =

Australian rules footballer

Personal information
- Full name: Gary R. Colling
- Nickname: Cat or Moggy
- Born: 17 March 1950 (age 76)
- Original team: Frankston Bombers
- Height: 188 cm (6 ft 2 in)
- Weight: 87 kg (192 lb)
- Position: Defender

Playing career^{1}
Years	Club	Games (Goals)
1968–1981	St Kilda	265 (49)
- ^{1} Playing statistics correct to the end of 1981.

Career highlights
- St Kilda captain, 1978

Gary Colling (born 17 March 1950) is a former Australian rules footballer who played for St Kilda from 1968 until 1981 in the Victorian Football League (VFL).

Colling played 265 VFL games for the Saints after being recruited from Frankston. A defender, he was St Kilda captain in 1978.

After retiring from football Colling held a number of positions at St Kilda; he coached the reserves team and was also football manager. He is still an active member of the Saints' past players and officials group.
