= Steven Hoffman (Australian footballer) =

Australian rules footballer

Personal information
- Full name: Steven Hoffman
- Born: 21 September 1951 (age 75)
- Original team: Pyramid Hill
- Height: 169 cm (5 ft 7 in)
- Weight: 70 kg (154 lb)
- Position: Midfield

Playing career^{1}
Years	Club	Games (Goals)
1969–78	South Melbourne	149 (187)
1979	Footscray	11 (5)
Total		160 (192)
- ^{1} Playing statistics correct to the end of 1979.

Steven Hoffman (born 21 September 1951) is a former Australian rules footballer who played for South Melbourne and Footscray in the Victorian Football League (VFL).

Hoffman was used initially at South Melbourne as a centreman and on the wing but to fill the void left by the retirement of Bob Skilton, became a rover. He had kicked five goals haul against Collingwood in just his second senior game and kicked a career best season tally of 31 in 1971. Hoffman polled well in the 1973 Brownlow Medal count, where he was South Melbourne's second top vote-getter, behind Peter Bedford. As part of a struggling club, Hoffman made just two appearances in finals during his career.

After crossing to Footscray in 1979, he brought up his 150th VFL game in the opening round and retired at the end of the year.
