= John Pitura =

Australian rules footballer

Personal information
- Born: 21 September 1950 (age 76); Wagga Wagga, New South Wales
- Original team: Wagga Tigers
- Height: 185 cm (6 ft 1 in)
- Weight: 86 kg (190 lb)
- Position: Centreman / half forward flank

Playing career^{1}
| Years | Club | Games (Goals) |
| 1969–1974 | South Melbourne | 99 (71) |
| 1975–1977 | Richmond | 40 (24) |
| Total | | 139 (95) |
- ^{1} Playing statistics correct to the end of 1977.

John Pitura (born 21 September 1950) is a former Australian rules footballer who played with the South Melbourne and Richmond Football Clubs in the Victorian Football League (VFL) during the 1970s.

Pitura was born in Wagga Wagga to a Polish father and as a child played rugby league. He was just 16 when he was recruited to South Melbourne through the club's Riverina zone by coach Norm Smith and he eventually made his league debut in 1969, ironically against Richmond. A left footed half forward flanker and centreman, Pitura represented Victoria at interstate football in 1973.

At the conclusion of the 1973 season, due to a strained relationship with the board, Pitura came close to leaving the club but remained on their books for the following year. He didn't play again until late July in 1974, after season long negotiations with South Melbourne. Richmond attempted to trade Pitura to their club at the year's end but the South Melbourne committee refused to clear him. After Pitura threatened to challenge the league's clearance rules in court, South Melbourne relented and traded him to Richmond in 1975.

The trade saw Graham Teasdale, Brian Roberts and Francis Jackson come to South Melbourne. All three of them made an impact at their new club, Teasdale won the 1977 Brownlow, Roberts finished equal sixth in the 1975 Brownlow before walking out on the club and Jackson played 100 games. Pitura however struggled at Richmond and managed just three seasons. His last game was in the 1977 finals campaign where Richmond lost to North Melbourne in the Semi Final, having defeated Pitura's old club South Melbourne a week earlier in the Elimination Final.

Pitura joined New South Wales club North Shore in 1978 as captain-coach and steered them to the premiership. He also spent some years playing in Queensland for both Kedron and Coorparoo. In 1981 he finished runner-up in the Grogan Medal.
