= Ron Wetzel (Australian footballer) =

Australian rules footballer

Personal information
- Full name: Ron Wetzel
- Born: 29 April 1947 (age 79)
- Original team: Springvale
- Height: 183 cm (6 ft 0 in)
- Weight: 78 kg (172 lb)

Playing career^{1}
| Years | Club | Games (Goals) |
| 1969–70 | South Melbourne | 18 (1) |
- ^{1} Playing statistics correct to the end of 1970.

Ron Wetzel (born 29 April 1947) is a former Australian rules footballer who played with South Melbourne in the Victorian Football League (VFL).
