= Barry Lawrence =

Australian rules footballer, born 1947

Personal information
- Born: 13 February 1946 (age 80)
- Original team: Longford (NTFA)
- Height: 183 cm (6 ft 0 in)
- Weight: 87 kg (192 lb)

Playing career^{1}
Years	Club	Games (Goals)
1969–1976	St Kilda	126 (80)
- ^{1} Playing statistics correct to the end of 1976.

Career highlights
- St Kilda captain 1974–1975; Victorian state representative 1972; Victorian state B side captain 1973

Barry Kenneth Lawrence (born 13 February 1946) is a former Australian rules footballer who played for St Kilda in the Victorian Football League (VFL) and for Longford in the Northern Tasmanian Football Association (NTFA).

Barry played as a forward for Longford in Tasmania and signed to play with Hawthorn in 1967 but he decided to stay in Tasmania for two more years.

He was selected as a back pocket in the St Kilda Team of the Century and on the half back flank in the Tasmanian Team of the Century.

Later he returned to the forward line.

He is the father of former St Kilda and Brisbane player Steven Lawrence.
