= Stephen Theodore (footballer) =

Australian rules footballer

Personal information
- Full name: Stephen Ross Theodore
- Born: 18 December 1950 (age 75)
- Original team: Coragulac
- Height: 178 cm (5 ft 10 in)
- Weight: 78 kg (172 lb)
- Position: Utility

Playing career^{1}
Years	Club	Games (Goals)
1969–1976	St Kilda	134 (111)
- ^{1} Playing statistics correct to the end of 1976.

Stephen Ross Theodore (born 18 December 1950) is a former Australian rules footballer who played with St Kilda in the Victorian Football League (VFL) during the 1970s.

Theodore kicked 22 goals in 1970 and was a half forward flanker in St Kilda's losing 1971 VFL Grand Final team. He played a total of ten finals games and kicked nine goals in finals football.

Once his VFL career ended, Theodore joined Tasmanian club Longford in the NTFA.

Theodore returned to Colac to captain coach the newly merged Colac-Coragulac Football Club in the Hampden Football League.
