= 1969 VFL season =

73rd season of the Victorian Football League (VFL)

1969 VFL premiership season
- Teams: 12
- Premiers: Richmond; 7th premiership
- Minor premiers: Collingwood; 14th minor premiership
- Consolation series: Hawthorn; 2nd Consolation series win
- Brownlow Medallist: Kevin Murray (Fitzroy)
- Coleman Medallist: Doug Wade (Geelong)

Attendance
- Matches played: 124
- Total attendance: 2,923,016 (23,573 per match)
- Highest: 119,165

The 1969 VFL season was the 73rd season of the Victorian Football League (VFL), the highest level senior Australian rules football competition in Victoria. The season featured twelve clubs, ran from 5 April until 27 September, and comprised a 20-game home-and-away season followed by a finals series featuring the top four clubs.

The premiership was won by the Richmond Football Club for the seventh time, after it defeated Carlton by 25 points in the 1969 VFL Grand Final.

== Background ==
In 1969, the VFL competition consisted of twelve teams of 18 on-the-field players each, plus two substitute players, known as the 19th man and the 20th man. A player could be substituted for any reason; however, once substituted, a player could not return to the field of play under any circumstances.

Teams played each other in a home-and-away season of 20 rounds; rounds 12 to 20 were the "home-and-away reverse" of rounds 1 to 9.

Once the 20 round home-and-away season had finished, the 1969 VFL Premiers were determined by the specific format and conventions of the Page–McIntyre system.

== Home-and-away season ==
=== Round 1 ===
Home team	Home team score	Away team	Away team score	Venue	Crowd	Date
North Melbourne	15.20 (110)	South Melbourne	14.17 (101)	Arden Street Oval	14,046	5 April 1969
Hawthorn	17.9 (111)	Collingwood	11.23 (89)	Glenferrie Oval	28,104	5 April 1969
St Kilda	11.13 (79)	Carlton	11.16 (82)	Moorabbin Oval	37,767	5 April 1969
Geelong	17.16 (118)	Melbourne	13.13 (91)	Kardinia Park	23,501	7 April 1969
Fitzroy	15.13 (103)	Footscray	23.21 (159)	Princes Park	20,210	7 April 1969
Richmond	15.21 (111)	Essendon	12.10 (82)	MCG	62,152	7 April 1969

=== Round 2 ===
Home team	Home team score	Away team	Away team score	Venue	Crowd	Date
Melbourne	12.7 (79)	North Melbourne	15.17 (107)	MCG	16,379	12 April 1969
Footscray	9.11 (65)	St Kilda	14.14 (98)	Western Oval	21,352	12 April 1969
Essendon	13.13 (91)	Geelong	14.7 (91)	Windy Hill	18,400	12 April 1969
Collingwood	11.16 (82)	Richmond	14.15 (99)	Victoria Park	27,353	12 April 1969
Carlton	30.30 (210)	Hawthorn	12.10 (82)	Princes Park	26,400	12 April 1969
South Melbourne	14.14 (98)	Fitzroy	15.10 (100)	Lake Oval	12,464	12 April 1969

=== Round 3 ===
Home team	Home team score	Away team	Away team score	Venue	Crowd	Date
Geelong	19.20 (134)	South Melbourne	11.8 (74)	Kardinia Park	15,068	19 April 1969
Fitzroy	14.7 (91)	St Kilda	19.18 (132)	Princes Park	12,240	19 April 1969
Essendon	12.13 (85)	Hawthorn	14.14 (98)	Windy Hill	15,800	19 April 1969
Collingwood	19.16 (130)	Melbourne	9.8 (62)	Victoria Park	18,729	19 April 1969
Richmond	13.28 (106)	North Melbourne	16.15 (111)	MCG	26,884	19 April 1969
Footscray	7.10 (52)	Carlton	11.15 (81)	Western Oval	20,250	19 April 1969

=== Round 4 ===
Home team	Home team score	Away team	Away team score	Venue	Crowd	Date
St Kilda	9.15 (69)	Geelong	13.14 (92)	Moorabbin Oval	42,954	25 April 1969
Melbourne	10.19 (79)	Essendon	13.19 (97)	MCG	38,358	25 April 1969
Carlton	13.11 (89)	Collingwood	23.15 (153)	Princes Park	39,120	26 April 1969
South Melbourne	13.13 (91)	Richmond	19.22 (136)	Lake Oval	16,663	26 April 1969
Hawthorn	19.16 (130)	Footscray	12.13 (85)	Glenferrie Oval	15,589	26 April 1969
North Melbourne	19.15 (129)	Fitzroy	13.18 (96)	Arden Street Oval	13,224	26 April 1969

=== Round 5 ===
Home team	Home team score	Away team	Away team score	Venue	Crowd	Date
Hawthorn	21.10 (136)	Melbourne	14.20 (104)	Glenferrie Oval	13,186	3 May 1969
Footscray	11.18 (84)	Geelong	22.12 (144)	Western Oval	17,522	3 May 1969
Essendon	16.17 (113)	North Melbourne	12.11 (83)	Windy Hill	23,000	3 May 1969
Carlton	20.17 (137)	South Melbourne	17.10 (112)	Princes Park	19,041	3 May 1969
Richmond	18.12 (120)	Fitzroy	6.19 (55)	MCG	22,991	3 May 1969
St Kilda	18.12 (120)	Collingwood	16.18 (114)	Moorabbin Oval	34,959	3 May 1969

=== Round 6 ===
Home team	Home team score	Away team	Away team score	Venue	Crowd	Date
Melbourne	13.15 (93)	Richmond	16.25 (121)	MCG	26,848	10 May 1969
Collingwood	17.13 (115)	Footscray	8.14 (62)	Victoria Park	19,025	10 May 1969
South Melbourne	14.9 (93)	St Kilda	7.14 (56)	Lake Oval	17,536	10 May 1969
North Melbourne	13.9 (87)	Hawthorn	14.12 (96)	Arden Street Oval	15,338	10 May 1969
Fitzroy	13.12 (90)	Essendon	17.13 (115)	Princes Park	13,028	10 May 1969
Geelong	18.16 (124)	Carlton	13.7 (85)	Kardinia Park	32,025	10 May 1969

=== Round 7 ===
Home team	Home team score	Away team	Away team score	Venue	Crowd	Date
Geelong	14.15 (99)	North Melbourne	14.23 (107)	Kardinia Park	17,102	17 May 1969
Footscray	8.10 (58)	South Melbourne	9.12 (66)	Western Oval	11,462	17 May 1969
Collingwood	13.20 (98)	Fitzroy	13.7 (85)	Victoria Park	14,614	17 May 1969
Carlton	14.24 (108)	Melbourne	12.6 (78)	Princes Park	14,973	17 May 1969
Richmond	7.10 (52)	Hawthorn	8.13 (61)	MCG	35,933	17 May 1969
St Kilda	16.10 (106)	Essendon	11.14 (80)	Moorabbin Oval	19,008	17 May 1969

=== Round 8 ===
Home team	Home team score	Away team	Away team score	Venue	Crowd	Date
North Melbourne	15.13 (103)	St Kilda	13.16 (94)	Arden Street Oval	16,602	24 May 1969
Fitzroy	12.9 (81)	Melbourne	15.12 (102)	Princes Park	9,086	24 May 1969
Essendon	15.15 (105)	Footscray	13.12 (90)	Windy Hill	15,400	24 May 1969
Hawthorn	13.16 (94)	Geelong	13.12 (90)	Glenferrie Oval	21,788	24 May 1969
South Melbourne	11.8 (74)	Collingwood	18.22 (130)	Lake Oval	21,142	24 May 1969
Richmond	12.14 (86)	Carlton	17.13 (115)	MCG	48,656	24 May 1969

=== Round 9 ===
Home team	Home team score	Away team	Away team score	Venue	Crowd	Date
Melbourne	9.15 (69)	South Melbourne	14.10 (94)	MCG	13,765	31 May 1969
Footscray	8.13 (61)	Richmond	7.8 (50)	Western Oval	8,529	31 May 1969
Collingwood	17.16 (118)	North Melbourne	9.4 (58)	Victoria Park	21,154	31 May 1969
Carlton	15.13 (103)	Essendon	6.9 (45)	Princes Park	16,930	31 May 1969
St Kilda	14.11 (95)	Hawthorn	7.7 (49)	Moorabbin Oval	15,186	31 May 1969
Geelong	15.17 (107)	Fitzroy	6.9 (45)	Kardinia Park	8,923	31 May 1969

=== Round 10 ===
Home team	Home team score	Away team	Away team score	Venue	Crowd	Date
Richmond	14.10 (94)	St Kilda	11.14 (80)	MCG	44,710	7 June 1969
Fitzroy	12.9 (81)	Hawthorn	16.9 (105)	Princes Park	10,170	7 June 1969
Collingwood	14.22 (106)	Geelong	8.11 (59)	Victoria Park	38,436	14 June 1969
South Melbourne	15.13 (103)	Essendon	18.15 (123)	Lake Oval	18,453	14 June 1969
Melbourne	17.18 (120)	Footscray	12.23 (95)	MCG	27,330	16 June 1969
North Melbourne	7.15 (57)	Carlton	10.18 (78)	Arden Street Oval	26,914	16 June 1969

=== Round 11 ===
Home team	Home team score	Away team	Away team score	Venue	Crowd	Date
Hawthorn	25.13 (163)	South Melbourne	14.21 (105)	Glenferrie Oval	13,369	21 June 1969
Geelong	17.11 (113)	Richmond	12.14 (86)	Kardinia Park	24,278	21 June 1969
Footscray	20.23 (143)	North Melbourne	15.7 (97)	Western Oval	12,893	21 June 1969
Carlton	24.14 (158)	Fitzroy	14.14 (98)	Princes Park	16,260	21 June 1969
St Kilda	17.18 (120)	Melbourne	13.16 (94)	Moorabbin Oval	19,491	21 June 1969
Essendon	13.19 (97)	Collingwood	16.12 (108)	Windy Hill	28,850	21 June 1969

=== Round 12 ===
Home team	Home team score	Away team	Away team score	Venue	Crowd	Date
Essendon	8.15 (63)	Richmond	7.12 (54)	Windy Hill	16,957	28 June 1969
Collingwood	9.24 (78)	Hawthorn	6.11 (47)	Victoria Park	31,923	28 June 1969
Carlton	9.12 (66)	St Kilda	7.12 (54)	Princes Park	22,154	28 June 1969
South Melbourne	12.11 (83)	North Melbourne	11.14 (80)	Lake Oval	9,461	28 June 1969
Melbourne	11.12 (78)	Geelong	15.9 (99)	MCG	23,557	28 June 1969
Footscray	17.13 (115)	Fitzroy	10.8 (68)	Western Oval	11,603	28 June 1969

=== Round 13 ===
Home team	Home team score	Away team	Away team score	Venue	Crowd	Date
Fitzroy	18.21 (129)	South Melbourne	11.14 (80)	Princes Park	7,540	5 July 1969
North Melbourne	19.16 (130)	Melbourne	19.13 (127)	Arden Street Oval	6,470	5 July 1969
St Kilda	12.15 (87)	Footscray	12.5 (77)	Moorabbin Oval	14,995	5 July 1969
Geelong	10.14 (74)	Essendon	13.16 (94)	Kardinia Park	20,247	5 July 1969
Richmond	13.15 (93)	Collingwood	12.19 (91)	MCG	45,546	5 July 1969
Hawthorn	11.14 (80)	Carlton	22.17 (149)	Glenferrie Oval	18,848	5 July 1969

=== Round 14 ===
Home team	Home team score	Away team	Away team score	Venue	Crowd	Date
North Melbourne	6.12 (48)	Richmond	17.15 (117)	Arden Street Oval	10,597	12 July 1969
Carlton	17.12 (114)	Footscray	16.16 (112)	Princes Park	15,078	12 July 1969
South Melbourne	12.15 (87)	Geelong	17.11 (113)	Lake Oval	9,598	12 July 1969
St Kilda	9.4 (58)	Fitzroy	11.8 (74)	Moorabbin Oval	11,874	12 July 1969
Hawthorn	17.19 (121)	Essendon	16.18 (114)	Glenferrie Oval	17,605	12 July 1969
Melbourne	16.11 (107)	Collingwood	15.19 (109)	MCG	32,485	12 July 1969

=== Round 15 ===
Home team	Home team score	Away team	Away team score	Venue	Crowd	Date
Richmond	22.12 (144)	South Melbourne	11.11 (77)	MCG	21,959	19 July 1969
Geelong	13.14 (92)	St Kilda	16.8 (104)	Kardinia Park	19,522	19 July 1969
Footscray	15.16 (106)	Hawthorn	14.9 (93)	Western Oval	15,955	19 July 1969
Fitzroy	20.6 (126)	North Melbourne	14.12 (96)	Princes Park	9,670	19 July 1969
Essendon	13.21 (99)	Melbourne	13.16 (94)	Windy Hill	15,012	19 July 1969
Collingwood	15.16 (106)	Carlton	17.14 (116)	Victoria Park	43,610	19 July 1969

=== Round 16 ===
Home team	Home team score	Away team	Away team score	Venue	Crowd	Date
Melbourne	13.17 (95)	Hawthorn	21.5 (131)	MCG	32,527	26 July 1969
North Melbourne	13.16 (94)	Essendon	9.13 (67)	Arden Street Oval	14,103	26 July 1969
South Melbourne	11.8 (74)	Carlton	19.12 (126)	Lake Oval	15,151	26 July 1969
Fitzroy	9.12 (66)	Richmond	8.9 (57)	Princes Park	16,211	2 August 1969
Collingwood	12.11 (83)	St Kilda	10.13 (73)	Victoria Park	29,759	2 August 1969
Geelong	23.17 (155)	Footscray	11.12 (78)	Kardinia Park	21,025	2 August 1969

=== Round 17 ===
Home team	Home team score	Away team	Away team score	Venue	Crowd	Date
St Kilda	9.14 (68)	South Melbourne	15.10 (100)	Moorabbin Oval	13,400	9 August 1969
Hawthorn	22.12 (144)	North Melbourne	18.18 (126)	Glenferrie Oval	13,504	9 August 1969
Essendon	19.18 (132)	Fitzroy	14.11 (95)	Windy Hill	15,548	9 August 1969
Carlton	14.11 (95)	Geelong	17.8 (110)	Princes Park	27,166	9 August 1969
Richmond	19.11 (125)	Melbourne	12.13 (85)	MCG	23,519	9 August 1969
Footscray	11.16 (82)	Collingwood	16.8 (104)	Western Oval	21,201	9 August 1969

=== Round 18 ===
Home team	Home team score	Away team	Away team score	Venue	Crowd	Date
Hawthorn	13.10 (88)	Richmond	13.21 (99)	Glenferrie Oval	19,480	16 August 1969
Essendon	19.25 (139)	St Kilda	11.10 (76)	Windy Hill	15,246	16 August 1969
North Melbourne	13.11 (89)	Geelong	14.14 (98)	Arden Street Oval	12,836	16 August 1969
South Melbourne	16.17 (113)	Footscray	13.18 (96)	Lake Oval	11,250	16 August 1969
Fitzroy	9.16 (70)	Collingwood	12.18 (90)	Princes Park	17,890	16 August 1969
Melbourne	14.15 (99)	Carlton	13.14 (92)	MCG	27,209	16 August 1969

=== Round 19 ===
Home team	Home team score	Away team	Away team score	Venue	Crowd	Date
Geelong	16.14 (110)	Hawthorn	14.11 (95)	Kardinia Park	31,569	23 August 1969
Collingwood	19.15 (129)	South Melbourne	6.22 (58)	Victoria Park	19,428	23 August 1969
Carlton	20.7 (127)	Richmond	24.12 (156)	Princes Park	27,657	23 August 1969
St Kilda	21.18 (144)	North Melbourne	8.10 (58)	Moorabbin Oval	11,109	23 August 1969
Melbourne	14.13 (97)	Fitzroy	14.15 (99)	MCG	17,790	23 August 1969
Footscray	14.10 (94)	Essendon	12.10 (82)	Western Oval	16,043	23 August 1969

=== Round 20 ===
Home team	Home team score	Away team	Away team score	Venue	Crowd	Date
Hawthorn	14.17 (101)	St Kilda	13.12 (90)	Glenferrie Oval	13,539	30 August 1969
Fitzroy	13.15 (93)	Geelong	9.16 (70)	Princes Park	12,990	30 August 1969
South Melbourne	17.18 (120)	Melbourne	13.7 (85)	Lake Oval	10,038	30 August 1969
Richmond	23.16 (154)	Footscray	9.10 (64)	MCG	33,591	30 August 1969
North Melbourne	13.11 (89)	Collingwood	14.12 (96)	Arden Street Oval	17,504	30 August 1969
Essendon	17.16 (118)	Carlton	20.9 (129)	Windy Hill	24,456	30 August 1969

== Ladder ==
(P)	Premiers
	Qualified for finals

#	Team	P	W	L	D	PF	PA	%	Pts
1	Collingwood	20	15	5	0	2129	1651	129.0	60
2	Carlton	20	15	5	0	2260	1875	120.5	60
3	Geelong	20	13	6	1	2092	1745	119.9	54
4	Richmond (P)	20	13	7	0	2060	1653	124.6	52
5	Hawthorn	20	13	7	0	2025	2050	98.8	52
6	Essendon	20	10	9	1	1941	1893	102.5	42
7	St Kilda	20	9	11	0	1803	1747	103.2	36
8	North Melbourne	20	8	12	0	1859	2125	87.5	32
9	South Melbourne	20	7	13	0	1803	2186	82.5	28
10	Fitzroy	20	7	13	0	1745	2118	82.4	28
11	Footscray	20	6	14	0	1778	2079	85.5	24
12	Melbourne	20	3	17	0	1838	2211	83.1	12

Rules for classification: 1. premiership points; 2. percentage; 3. points for
Average score: 97.2
Source: AFL Tables

== Finals series ==
=== Semi-finals ===
Team	1 Qtr	2 Qtr	3 Qtr	Final
Geelong	2.1	2.4	3.6	7.7 (49)
Richmond	8.3	14.7	20.11	25.17 (167)
Attendance: 101,233

Team	1 Qtr	2 Qtr	3 Qtr	Final
Collingwood	2.4	5.5	6.6	10.11 (71)
Carlton	1.4	5.8	11.10	16.11 (107)
Attendance: 108,544

=== Preliminary final ===
Team	1 Qtr	2 Qtr	3 Qtr	Final
Collingwood	4.2	7.6	8.8	12.9 (81)
Richmond	3.2	6.12	13.14	15.17 (107)
Attendance: 107,279

=== Grand final ===
Team	1 Qtr	2 Qtr	3 Qtr	Final
Carlton	1.4	2.7	8.10	8.12 (60)
Richmond	2.2	6.5	8.6	12.13 (85)
Attendance: 119,165

== Consolation Night Series Competition ==
The consolation night series were held under the floodlights at Lake Oval, South Melbourne, for the teams (5th to 12th on ladder) out of the finals at the end of the home and away rounds.

Final: Hawthorn 10.17 (77) defeated Melbourne 9.18 (72).

== Season notes ==
- The VFL introduced a rule awarding a free kick against a player if he kicked the ball out of bounds on the full. The rule is considered to be a major contributor to an increase in scoring, and an increased prominence of full forwards, by forcing teams to play more direct football – a trend which had also seen under the out-of-bounds rules which were in place during the 1930s. Three full-forwards kicked large hauls of goals in 1969: Doug Wade of Geelong with 127 goals, Peter Hudson of Hawthorn with 120 goals (including 16.1 in Round 5), and Peter McKenna of Collingwood with 98 goals (including 16.4 in Round 19). The VFL was reprimanded for introducing the rule change without the approval of the Australian National Football Council, but there was no further penalty and the rule was soon agreed to at ANFC level.
- Prior to the season, Geoff Bryant of Victorian Football Association club Box Hill was cleared to the North Melbourne Football Club. Under a rule that the VFA had introduced in 1967, a transfer fee of $2,000 was set for Bryant's clearance; but, under the Coulter Laws, VFL clubs were forbidden from paying any sort of transfer fee. The VFA formally approved Bryant's clearance, and it initially appeared that it had done so without the transfer fee being paid; but VFA secretary Fred Hill then reported to the press that North Melbourne had indeed secretly paid the transfer fee in defiance of the VFL's rules – and, in fact, Box Hill president Reg Shineberg claimed to have received the fee in cash, under cover of darkness, from a man he did not know. North Melbourne was required to face the VFL arbitrators over the allegations, but charges against the club were dropped when the VFA did not provide any written corroborating evidence. Whether or not the illegal transfer fee was actually paid was never proven.
- In Round 2, Carlton set the record for highest score in a game, scoring 30.30 (210) against Hawthorn. This beat Richmond's 38-year-old record, set in the 1931 VFL season, by eleven points. This Carlton record stood for another 9 years, remained unbeaten until the 1978 VFL season.
- The lowest score of the season was a record high 6.9 (45). The previous record high lowest score was 42 points in 1943.
- In Round 4, Carlton and Collingwood played a tough, spiteful, and vicious match with many brawls at Princes Park. "Percy" Jones of Carlton was reported for striking both Terry Waters and "Jerker" Jenkin of Collingwood during the first quarter; Carlton's Ricky McLean was reported for striking Collingwood's Len Thompson during the first quarter and for striking Collingwood's Brian McKenzie during the last quarter; Ted Potter was reported for striking Carlton's John Nicholls during the last quarter (Nicholls had to leave the field with an eye injury); Len Thompson was reported for striking Carlton's Vin Waite (Carlton's 19th man, who substituted for the injured Nicholls) during the last quarter. Whilst the field umpire (Ray Sleeth) was writing out the match reports he had an extended, heated clash with Carlton president George Harris; the reason for this extended clash was later evident when all of the charges against all of the players were dismissed on a technicality: the umpires had taken too long to inform the club officials of the charges after the final siren had sounded.
- In Round 8, Michael Patterson was hit in the face with a football by Carlton trainer, Ron Vincent. The event was immortalised in Mike Brady's football anthem "Up There Cazaly".
- On 27 July 1969, Ted Whitten turned 36. The Round 16 Footscray team of twenty contained ten players who had not even been born when Whitten played his first game for Footscray in 1951.
- In the First Semi-Final Richmond thrashed Geelong by a VFL semi-final record margin, 25.17 (167) to 7.7 (49) in front of a record crowd of 101,233 spectators.
- In the 1969 Grand Final, Ian Owen's Richmond guernsey carried the number 52. There is no record of any Grand Final player carrying a larger number. (Owen played the entire match with a depressed fracture of the cheekbone that he had sustained in the Preliminary Final against Collingwood a week earlier.)

== Awards ==
- The 1969 VFL Premiership team was Richmond.
- The VFL's leading goalkicker was Doug Wade of Geelong who kicked 127 goals (including 5 goals in the final series).
- The winner of the 1969 Brownlow Medal was Kevin Murray of Fitzroy with 19 votes.
- Melbourne took the "wooden spoon" in 1969.
- The reserves premiership was won by Melbourne. Melbourne 12.16 (88) defeated Carlton 8.12 (60) in the Grand Final, held as a curtain-raiser to the seniors Grand Final at the Melbourne Cricket Ground on 27 September.

=== Leading goalkickers ===
- Numbers highlighted in blue indicates the player led the goalkicking at the end of that round.
- DNP = did not play in that round.

	Player	Club	1	2	3	4	5	6	7	8	9	10	11	12	13	14	15	16	17	18	19	20	SF	PF	GF	Total
1	Doug Wade	Geelong	4_{4}	4_{8}	9_{17}	4_{21}	9_{30}	7_{37}	7_{44}	7_{51}	7_{58}	4_{62}	2_{64}	7_{71}	6_{77}	4_{81}	8_{89}	11_{100}	5_{105}	7_{112}	8_{120}	2_{122}	5_{127}			127
2	Peter Hudson	Hawthorn	6_{6}	4_{10}	6_{16}	4_{20}	16_{36}	_{42}	0_{42}	6_{48}	4_{52}	DNP	13_{65}	2_{67}	4_{71}	5_{76}	9_{85}	9_{96}	6_{100}	6_{106}	6_{111}	8_{120}				120
3	Peter McKenna	Collingwood	4_{4}	3_{7}	6_{13}	3_{16}	5_{21}	7_{28}	DNP	6_{34}	DNP	4_{38}	DNP	1_{39}	6_{45}	7_{52}	1_{53}	5_{58}	5_{63}	5_{68}	16_{84}	4_{88}	4_{92}	6_{98}		98
4	Doug Searl	Fitzroy	5_{5}	8_{13}	DNP	4_{17}	1_{18}	3_{21}	5_{26}	4_{30}	2_{32}	2_{34}	5_{39}	4_{43}	5_{48}	4_{52}	2_{53}	1_{55}	7_{62}	3_{65}	2_{67}	1_{68}				68
5	Alex Jesaulenko	Carlton	1_{1}	6_{7}	1_{8}	1_{9}	1_{10}	5_{15}	3_{18}	5_{23}	2_{25}	DNP	6_{31}	DNP	0_{31}	7_{38}	2_{40}	3_{43}	6_{49}	1_{50}	5_{55}	7_{62}	3_{65}		1_{66}	66
6	Sam Kekovich	North Melbourne	4_{4}	4_{8}	6_{14}	3_{17}	4_{21}	DNP	2_{23}	2_{25}	2_{27}	DNP	4_{31}	DNP	6_{37}	1_{38}	DNP	3_{41}	6_{47}	4_{51}	1_{52}	4_{56}				56
7	Rex Hunt	Richmond	2_{2}	7_{9}	5_{14}	5_{19}	5_{24}	4_{28}	2_{30}	3_{33}	3_{36}	3_{39}	1_{40}	DNP	4_{44}	1_{45}	5_{50}	0_{50}	2_{52}	2_{54}	DNP	DNP	1_{54}	0_{55}	0_{55}	55
8	Kevin Neale	St Kilda	5_{5}	7_{12}	4_{16}	0_{16}	4_{20}	3_{23}	1_{24}	2_{26}	0_{26}	3_{29}	4_{33}	4_{37}	4_{41}	0_{41}	5_{46}	3_{49}	1_{50}	0_{50}	0_{50}	0_{50}				50
9	Ross Dillon	Melbourne	2_{2}	0_{2}	0_{2}	0_{2}	0_{2}	0_{2}	1_{3}	2_{5}	3_{8}	DNP	4_{12}	1_{13}	4_{17}	3_{20}	4_{24}	5_{29}	6_{35}	4_{39}	6_{45}	3_{48}				48
10	Peter Jones	Carlton	3_{3}	7_{10}	2_{12}	2_{14}	3_{17}	1_{18}	0_{18}	1_{19}	1_{20}	1_{21}	3_{24}	0_{24}	5_{29}	1_{30}	3_{33}	2_{35}	4_{39}	3_{42}	1_{43}	2_{45}	1_{46}			46

== See also ==
- List of VFL debuts in 1969

== Sources ==
- 1969 VFL season at AFL Tables
- 1969 VFL season at Australian Football
