= 1972 Carlton Football Club season =

Carlton Football Club
1972 season
- President: George Harris
- Coach: John Nicholls
- Captain: John Nicholls
- Home ground: Princes Park
- VFL season: 1st (18–3–1)
- Finals series: Premiers
- Championship of Australia: Runners-up
- Best and Fairest: Geoff Southby
- Leading goalkicker: Greg Kennedy (76)

The 1972 Carlton Football Club season was the Carlton Football Club's 109th season of competition, and 76th as a member of the Victorian Football League. Carlton fielded teams in the senior, reserves and under-19s grades of the 1972 VFL season.

Under captain-coach John Nicholls, who assumed the coaching role this season after the departure of dual-premiership coach Ron Barassi at the end of 1971, Carlton won the VFL minor and major premierships, defeating Richmond in the Grand Final. It was the 11th senior VFL premiership in the club's history.

Following the VFL season, Carlton competed in the Championship of Australia tournament, finishing runner-up to the SANFL's North Adelaide. The club then embarked upon a world tour, playing three exhibition matches overseas against an Australian All-Stars team.

== Club summary ==
The 1972 VFL season was the 76th season of the VFL competition since its inception in 1897; and, having competed in every season, it was also the 76th season contested by the Carlton Football Club. As it had been since 1897, the club's home ground was Princes Park in North Carlton; additionally, it was standard for all clubs in the league at the time to play three or four matches per year at the neutral VFL Park in Mulgrave. In addition to its senior team, Carlton fielded teams in both the VFL reserves and under-19s competitions.

=== Senior personnel ===
George Harris continued as club president through 1972, a position he had held since after the 1964 season.

Following the 1971 season, Ron Barassi stepped down as coach; at the time, he left to focus on his business career, although he ultimately returned to VFL coaching (at North Melbourne) after only a year. Barassi had coached Carlton for seven seasons, and led the team to two senior premierships: 1968 and 1970. John Nicholls, who had been captain since mid-1968, took on Barassi's former role to become captain-coach.

== Squad and player statistics for 1972 ==
The following is the final senior squad as announced at the start of the 1972 season. Numbers in parentheses represent games played and goals kicked for Carlton in the 1972 VFL premiership season. Only supplementary players who played a senior match during the season are listed.

Carlton Football Club
| Senior list | | Supplementaries | Coaching staff |
|---|---|---|---|
| 2 John Nicholls (25,28) (c); 3 Kevin Hall (13,1); 5 Syd Jackson (23,21); 6 Garry Crane (10,1); 7 Andrew Lukas (22,3); 8 Trevor Keogh (26,23); 9 John Warden (2,0); 10 Adrian Gallagher (23,34); 11 Bruce Doull (26,1); 12 Barry Armstrong (20,15); 13 Eric Pascoe (1,1); 15 Phillip Pinnell (20,0); 16 Greg Kennedy (22,76); 17 Brent Crosswell (14,18); 18 Brian Walsh (6,4); 19 John O'Connell (20,0); 20 Geoff Southby (25,0); 21 Barry Gill (3,0); 22 Neil Chandler (4,2) | 23 Peter Warburton (2,0); 24 Peter Fyffe (8,1); 25 Alex Jesaulenko (25,33); 27 David Dickson (24,13); 28 Peter "Percy" Jones (24,34); 29 Paul O'Brien (1,0); 30 Vin Waite (20,1); 32 Bryan Quirk (17,4); 33 Paul Hurst (21,0); 34 Ian Robertson (16,8); 35 Barry Mulcair (0,0); 38 Mark Amos (0,0); 42 Robert Walls (25,47); 43 David McKay (26,17); Murray Dickson (0,0); Greg Lethborg (0,0); Lance Styles (0,0); Gary Whitney (0,0) | 31 Peter Hall (3,2); 45 Rod Austin (4,0) | Head coach: John Nicholls; Legend: (c) Captain(s); (vc) Vice-captain(s); Updated: Source(s): |

== Playing list changes ==
The following summarises player transfers to and from the club between the conclusion of the 1971 season and the conclusion of the 1972 season.

=== In ===
| Player | Previous club | League | Comments |
|---|---|---|---|
| (Victoria (state)) David Dickson | Preston | VFA |
| (Tasmania) Murray Dickson | Hobart | TANFL |
| (Victoria (state)) Greg Kennedy | Eaglehawk | Bendigo FL | Country zone selection |
| (Tasmania) Greg Lethborg | Scottsdale | NTFA |
| (Victoria (state)) Eric Pascoe | Northern United | Bendigo FL | Country zone selection |
| (Tasmania) Gary Whitney | City-South | NTFA |

=== Out ===
| Player | New Club | League | Comments |
|---|---|---|---|
| (Victoria (state)) Mark Amos | Fitzroy | VFL | On the Carlton senior list at the start of the year, but later cleared to Fitzroy |
| (Victoria (state)) Bill Barrot | North Melbourne | VFL | Initially retired, before attempting a return to league football with North Melbourne. |
| (Victoria (state)) Ian Collins | Port Melbourne | VFA |
| (Victoria (state)) John Goold | | | Retired |
| (Victoria (state)) Ted Hopkins | | | Retired |
| Gary Lawson-Smith | | | Retired |
| (Victoria (state)) Ricky McLean | Richmond | VFL |
| (Victoria (state)) Chris Mitchell | | | Retired |
| (Victoria (state)) Sergio Silvagni | | | Retired |

== Season summary ==
=== Pre-season practice matches ===
Carlton played three practice matches during March 1972 – including, as it turned out, matches against both of the teams it would face in Grand Finals later in the year: Richmond and North Adelaide. Carlton won all three practice matches.

| **Date** | **Opponent** | **Scores** (Carlton's scores indicated in **bold**) | | | **Venue** | **Attendance** |
| **Date** | **Opponent** | Home | Away | Result | **Venue** | **Attendance** |
| Sunday, 5 March | South Melbourne | 18.16 (124) | **20.11 (131)** | Won by 7 points | Lake Oval (A) | |
| Saturday, 18 March | North Adelaide | 12.7 (79) | **23.19 (157)** | Won by 78 points | Prospect Oval (A) | 3,000 (approx.) |
| Saturday, 25 March | Richmond | **14.14 (98)** | 13.19 (97) | Won by 1 point | Princes Park (H) | |

=== Home-and-away season ===
Carlton finished the home-and-away season as the minor premiers in 1972, with a win–loss record of 18–3–1. The team sat as low as 6th after Round 4 with a record of 2–1–1, but lost only two of its remaining eighteen matches for the season, moving up to and holding first place from Round 12 until the end of the season. Two of Carlton's three losses were by fewer than six points; a 31-point loss against Richmond in Round 14 was the worst performance of the home-and-away season.

Despite the strong performance, Carlton was in a constant fight for the minor premiership with Richmond, who finished with a record of 18–4–0. Richmond drew within half a game of Carlton after beating them in Round 14; both teams then won all of their remaining eight matches, maintaining that half-game margin until the end of the season. Carlton came very close to losing the minor premiership in the final round, eventually beating Footscray by three points with the significant assistance of Footscray's inaccurate goalkicking .

| **Round** | **Date and local time** | **Opponent** | **Scores** (Carlton's scores indicated in **bold**) | | | **Venue** | **Attendance** | **Ladder** **position** |
| **Round** | **Date and local time** | **Opponent** | Home | Away | Result | **Venue** | **Attendance** | **Ladder** **position** |
| 1 | Saturday, 1 April (2:10 pm) | Fitzroy | **11.15 (81)** | 10.10 (70) | Won by 11 points | Princes Park (H) | 33,601 | 5th |
| 2 | Saturday, 8 April (2:10 pm) | Collingwood | 10.15 (75) | **11.9 (75)** | Match drawn | Victoria Park (A) | 37,070 | 4th |
| 3 | Saturday, 15 April (2:10 pm) | South Melbourne | 14.10 (94) | **18.18 (126)** | Won by 32 points | Lake Oval (A) | 20,491 | 3rd |
| 4 | Saturday, 22 April (2:10 pm) | Richmond | **15.14 (104)** | 15.19 (109) | Lost by 5 points | Princes Park (H) | 28,377 | 6th |
| 5 | Tuesday, 25 April (2:10 pm) | Essendon | 10.13 (73) | **13.10 (88)** | Won by 15 points | VFL Park (A) | 50,367 | 6th |
| 6 | Saturday, 6 May (2:10 pm) | Geelong | **22.15 (147)** | 14.14 (98) | Won by 49 points | Princes Park (H) | 18,365 | 3rd |
| 7 | Saturday, 13 May (2:10 pm) | Melbourne | **10.15 (75)** | 5.8 (38) | Won by 37 points | VFL Park (H) | 30,114 | 2nd |
| 8 | Saturday, 20 May (2:10 pm) | St Kilda | 10.12 (72) | **14.15 (99)** | Won by 27 points | Moorabbin Oval (A) | 31,547 | 1st |
| 9 | Saturday, 27 May (2:10 pm) | North Melbourne | **16.13 (109)** | 6.11 (47) | Won by 62 points | Princes Park (H) | 15,626 | 1st |
| 10 | Saturday, 3 June (2:10 pm) | Hawthorn | 11.22 (88) | **13.7 (85)** | Lost by 3 points | Glenferrie Oval (A) | 26,585 | 3rd |
| 11 | Saturday, 10 June (2:10 pm) | Footscray | 7.9 (51) | **7.15 (57)** | Won by 6 points | Western Oval (A) | 23,948 | 2nd |
| 12 | Saturday, 24 June (2:10 pm) | Fitzroy | 8.7 (55) | **13.13 (91)** | Won by 36 points | VFL Park (A) | 29,258 | 1st |
| 13 | Saturday, 1 July (2:10 pm) | Collingwood | **10.10 (70)** | 9.8 (62) | Won by 8 points | Princes Park (H) | 35,106 | 1st |
| 14 | Saturday, 8 July (2:10 pm) | Richmond | 17.17 (119) | **13.10 (88)** | Lost by 31 points | M.C.G. (A) | 46,471 | 1st |
| 15 | Saturday, 15 July (2:10 pm) | South Melbourne | **20.8 (128)** | 8.15 (63) | Won by 65 points | Princes Park (H) | 13,865 | 1st |
| 16 | Saturday, 22 July (2:10 pm) | Essendon | **20.13 (133)** | 17.15 (117) | Won by 16 points | Princes Park (H) | 27,720 | 1st |
| 17 | Saturday, 29 July (2:10 pm) | Geelong | 9.13 (67) | **17.17 (119)** | Won by 52 points | Kardinia Park (A) | 24,797 | 1st |
| 18 | Saturday, 5 August (2:10 pm) | Melbourne | 8.18 (66) | **11.11 (77)** | Won by 11 points | M.C.G. (A) | 33,364 | 1st |
| 19 | Saturday, 12 August (2:10 pm) | St Kilda | **13.16 (94)** | 10.11 (71) | Won by 23 points | Princes Park (H) | 22,109 | 1st |
| 20 | Saturday, 19 August (2:10 pm) | North Melbourne | 8.12 (60) | **23.11 (149)** | Won by 89 points | Arden Street Oval (A) | 11,271 | 1st |
| 21 | Saturday, 26 August (2:10 pm) | Hawthorn | **24.12 (156)** | 11.22 (88) | Won by 68 points | Princes Park (H) | 32,048 | 1st |
| 22 | Saturday, 2 September (2:10 pm) | Footscray | **13.8 (86)** | 11.17 (83) | Won by 3 points | Princes Park (H) | 24,619 | 1st |

=== Finals series ===
Under the new McIntyre Final Five, Carlton had a bye in the first week of finals, before playing qualifying final winner Richmond in the second semi-final. In a low-scoring match, Carlton held Richmond to only one goal in the first half, but Richmond was able to fight back and level the scores at 8.13 (61); Alex Jesaulenko had an unlikely set shot from 70m after the final siren to attempt win the game, but did not make the distance. The match was replayed the following weekend, and Carlton suffered its heaviest loss of the season, by 41 points. In the preliminary final against St Kilda, Carlton overcome an 11-point half-time deficit to win by 16 points, and to progress to the Grand Final.

Entering the Grand Final, Richmond was the strong favourite, with bookmakers offering odds of 1–2. Richmond had a record of 11–0–1 from its last twelve games, and had a record of 3–0–1 in its four games against Carlton for the season, including inflicting Carlton's heaviest two losses. Some commentators thought Carlton was impressive enough against St Kilda to be a chance at winning, but most tipped Richmond for the premiership. In an unprecedentedly high scoring game, Carlton kicked eight goals in the first quarter and ten in the second quarter to set up a match-winning 45-point lead by half-time, which Richmond never challenged; Carlton ultimately won by 27 points. In a strong display from its forwards, Alex Jesaulenko kicked seven goals, and Robert Walls and John Nicholls kicked six each.

| **Week** | **Date and local time** | **Opponent** | **Scores** (Carlton's scores indicated in **bold**) | | | **Venue** | **Attendance** |
| **Week** | **Date and local time** | **Opponent** | Home | Away | Result | **Venue** | **Attendance** |
| Week 1 | Received first week bye for finishing as minor premiers | | | | | | |
| Second semi-final | Saturday, 16 September (2:30 pm) | Richmond | **8.13 (61)** | 8.13 (61) | Match drawn | VFL Park (H) | 54,338 |
| Second semi-final Replay | Saturday, 23 September (2:30 pm) | Richmond | **9.15 (69)** | 15.20 (110) | Lost by 41 points | M.C.G. (H) | 92,670 |
| Preliminary Final | Saturday, 30 September (2:30 pm) | St Kilda | **16.13 (109)** | 13.15 (93) | Won by 16 points | M.C.G. (H) | 96,272 |
| Grand Final | Saturday, 7 October (2:50 pm) | Richmond | 22.18 (150) | **28.9 (177)** | Won by 27 points | M.C.G. (A) | 112,393 |

=== Championship of Australia ===
The 1972 Championship of Australia series was played on the weekend following the VFL Grand Final. The tournament was held at the Adelaide Oval, with two semi-finals played on the Saturday, and the final and third-place playoff on the Sunday. The tournament was contested by the premiers of the four state leagues: Carlton (VFL), North Adelaide (SANFL), East Perth (WANFL), and City-South (from the NTFA, winner of the Tasmanian State Premiership). The prize for the winning team was $10,000.

Carlton easily accounted for East Perth in its semi-final, a rough game from which several East Perth players earned suspensions. The Grand final against North Adelaide was a close contest; Carlton held a two-goal lead after five minutes of the final quarter, but did not score again and was overrun by North Adelaide by one point.

| **Week** | **Date and local time** | **Opponent** | **Scores** (Carlton's scores indicated in **bold**) | | | **Venue** | **Attendance** |
| **Week** | **Date and local time** | **Opponent** | Home | Away | Result | **Venue** | **Attendance** |
| Semi-final | Saturday, 14 October (3:00 pm) | East Perth | **20.15 (135)** | 12.12 (84) | Won by 51 points | Adelaide Oval (N) | 19,599 |
| Final | Sunday, 15 October (3:00 pm) | North Adelaide | 10.13 (73) | **10.12 (72)** | Lost by 1 point | Adelaide Oval (A) | 23,213 |

=== World tour matches ===
In October and November, Carlton and a team of All-Stars embarked upon a world tour, playing three exhibition matches in different countries. The All-Stars won the series 2–1.

| **Week** | **Date** | **Opponent** | **Scores** (Carlton's scores indicated in **bold**) | | | **Venue** | **Attendance** |
| **Week** | **Date** | **Opponent** | Home | Away | Result | **Venue** | **Attendance** |
| 1 | Sunday, 29 October | All-Stars | **12.12 (84)** | 10.18 (78) | Won by 6 points | The Oval, London, UK (N) | 9,000 (approx.) |
| 2 | Sunday, 5 November^{N 1} | All-Stars | **19.10 (124)** | 19.13 (127) | Lost by 3 points | Athens, Greece (N) | 3,000 (approx.) |
| 3 | Sunday, 12 November | All-Stars | **9.11 (65)** | 11.11 (77) | Lost by 12 points | Singapore (N) | 8,500 (approx.) |

== Ladder ==
| (P) | Premiers |
| | Qualified for finals |

| # | Team | P | W | L | D | PF | PA | % | Pts |
|---|---|---|---|---|---|---|---|---|---|
| 1 | Carlton (P) | 22 | 18 | 3 | 1 | 2237 | 1666 | 134.3 | 74 |
| 2 | Richmond | 22 | 18 | 4 | 0 | 2469 | 2098 | 117.7 | 72 |
| 3 | Collingwood | 22 | 14 | 7 | 1 | 2338 | 1747 | 133.8 | 58 |
| 4 | St Kilda | 22 | 14 | 8 | 0 | 1989 | 1721 | 115.6 | 56 |
| 5 | Essendon | 22 | 14 | 8 | 0 | 2317 | 2140 | 108.3 | 56 |
| 6 | Hawthorn | 22 | 13 | 9 | 0 | 2277 | 2050 | 111.1 | 52 |
| 7 | Footscray | 22 | 11 | 11 | 0 | 1930 | 2038 | 94.7 | 44 |
| 8 | Melbourne | 22 | 10 | 12 | 0 | 2043 | 1929 | 105.9 | 40 |
| 9 | Fitzroy | 22 | 9 | 13 | 0 | 1997 | 2062 | 96.8 | 36 |
| 10 | Geelong | 22 | 7 | 15 | 0 | 1994 | 2369 | 84.2 | 28 |
| 11 | South Melbourne | 22 | 2 | 20 | 0 | 1513 | 2323 | 65.1 | 8 |
| 12 | North Melbourne | 22 | 1 | 21 | 0 | 1628 | 2589 | 62.9 | 4 |

Rules for classification: 1. premiership points; 2. percentage; 3. points for
Average score: 93.7
Source: AFL Tables

== Premiership team ==
The Carlton premiership twenty was as below.

Carlton
| B: | 19 John O'Connell | 20 Geoff Southby | 43 David McKay |
| HB: | 30 Vin Waite | 11 Bruce Doull | 33 Paul Hurst |
| C: | 34 Ian Robertson | 12 Barry Armstrong | 27 David Dickson |
| HF: | 22 Neil Chandler | 42 Robert Walls | 5 Syd Jackson |
| F: | 2 John Nicholls (c) | 25 Alex Jesaulenko | 8 Trevor Keogh |
| Foll: | 28 Peter Jones | 3 Kevin Hall | 10 Adrian Gallagher |
| Res: | 7 Andrew Lukas | 6 Garry Crane | |
| Coach: | John Nicholls | | |

== Notable events ==
=== World tour ===
From 22 October until 13 November, the Carlton team went on a three-week world tour. The tour was organised during the season by president George Harris. In addition to a busy social calendar, the tour featured three exhibition matches between Carlton and a team of All-Stars from other senior teams around Australia.

When initially organised, the tour was to have featured matches at: The Oval in London, UK; on a temporary field in Stuttgart, West Germany; and at Lenin Stadium in Moscow, USSR – however, of these, only the London match went ahead. The Moscow match was abruptly cancelled by the Soviet Union, which cited "technical reasons" in its communication to the Australian embassy; Harris arranged for the Russian leg of the tour to instead be played in Athens, Greece. The Stuttgart match was then cancelled when it became apparent that an early winter would render the match unplayable; Harris organised for this leg of the tour to be played in Singapore.

The All-Stars team which accompanied Carlton on the tour was announced in July. Twenty-two players were selected, each from a different club: eleven came from the other eleven VFL clubs, five came from SANFL clubs, five came from WAFL clubs and one came from Tasmania.

1972 Carlton World Tour All-Stars
| Peter Bedford (Sth Melb.) | Bob Beecroft (Swan Dist.) | Malcolm Blight (Woodville) |
| Mal Brown (East Perth) | Tony Burgan (Sturt) | Neil Button (Norwood) |
| David Clarke (Geelong) | Peter Crimmins (Hawthorn) | Gary Dempsey (Footscray) |
| David Dench (Nth Melb.) | Gary Hardeman (Melbourne) | Royce Hart (Richmond) |
| Glynn Hewitt (West Adel.) | Jim Leitch (Scottsdale) | Harvey Merrigan (Fitzroy) |
| Ian Miller (Perth) | Barry Price (Coll'wood) | Barrie Robran (Nth Adel.) |
| Ross Smith (St Kilda) | Peter Stephen (East Frem.) | Alan Watling (West Perth) |
| John Williams (Essendon) | Coach: Keith McKenzie (Carlton) | |

The first match was played as originally scheduled at The Oval in London. A purpose-built cricket venue, The Oval was an appropriate size and shape for Australian rules football; the hard centre wicket area was covered over with coir mats for the match. The Prince of Wales (now Charles III) was in attendance at the match, and met with the touring party prior to the game. The match drew a crowd of approximately 9,000 people, almost all of whom were Australian expatriates. Carlton won the match 12.12 (84) to 10.18 (78).

The second match in Athens was the most bizarre of the tour. The game was played on a soccer pitch, which is both rectangular and significantly smaller than a typical Australian rules football field; to accommodate this, the field for the exhibition match was aligned along the diagonal of the rectangle to maximise its length, and the match was played with eleven players per side instead of eighteen. This resulted in a high-scoring match, the All-Stars winning 19.13 (127) to 19.10 (124); Robert Walls kicked ten goals for Carlton and David Clarke kicked nine for the All-Stars. The attendance of 3,000 was described as being similar in size to that drawn by a midweek soccer match in Athens at the time, and the Greek crowd reportedly supported Carlton because its guernsey matched the Greek national colours of blue and white.

The final match in Singapore was played on a temporary oval field, which was set up on three adjacent soccer pitches. The crowd of 8,500 was mostly a mixture of locals and Australian servicemen based in Singapore. The oppressively humid weather was the most significant difficulty with the match, which was won by the All-Stars, 11.11 (77) to 9.11 (65). Laws in Singapore at the time prevented men from wearing long hair, so many players on both teams were forced to have haircuts before the tour.

Upon return, Harris announced that the club intended to return to Europe for a second tour in 1973, including another match at The Oval, a rescheduled match in Stuttgart, as well as matches in Wales and Ireland; but, the second tour never went ahead.

=== Other notable events ===
Greg Kennedy's omission from the Grand Final team

The most notable absence from the premiership twenty was that of full forward Greg Kennedy. Kennedy was the club's leading goalkicker for the season, and had played 22 matches; but he had kicked only one goal in each of the semi-finals against Richmond. In a tactical change, Nicholls shifted Kennedy to 20th man in the preliminary final against St Kilda, and Alex Jesaulenko, who had been playing in the midfield throughout the season, returned to his former position at full-forward and kicked seven goals; so, when Nicholls adopted the same strategy for the Grand Final, there was no longer a role in the team for Kennedy to fill and he was omitted. Kennedy was replaced as 20th man by Garry Crane; Jesaulenko kicked seven goals from full-forward in the Grand Final.

== Leading goalkickers ==
Full forward Greg Kennedy was Carlton's leading goalkicker, in his first season of VFL football. Aged 22 at the start of the season, Kennedy was zoned to Carlton from Eaglehawk, after he kicked 139 goals and won the Michelsen Medal as Bendigo Football League best and fairest in 1971. He kicked 76 goals in 22 VFL premiership matches, and a further three goals in the Championship of Australia matches. It was the only time that Kennedy led Carlton's goalkicking in the three seasons he spent with the club.

| Player | Goals |
|---|---|
| Greg Kennedy | 76 |
| Robert Walls | 47 |
| Adrian Gallagher | 34 |
| Percy Jones | 34 |
| Alex Jesaulenko | 33 |

== Team awards and records ==
Game records

- Round 16 – Carlton's second quarter score of 12.0 (72) against Essendon set a new VFL record for the most goals scored in a quarter without scoring a behind. This record still stands as of 2021, having been matched only once. It also set a new record for Carlton's highest second quarter score, which stood until 1975.
- Round 16 – Carlton's half-time score of 16.4 (100) against Essendon set a new record as Carlton's highest ever half-time score. This record stood only until this year's Grand Final.
- Grand Final – Carlton's score of 28.9 (177) set a new record for the highest score in a Grand Final. This record still stands as of 2021.
- Grand Final – Carlton's and Richmond's combined score of 50.27 (327) set a new record as the highest aggregate score ever in any VFL match, Grand Final or otherwise. This remained the record until 1978.
- Grand Final – Carlton's half-time score of 18.6 (114) set a new record as Carlton's highest ever half-time score. This record stood until 1982.

== Individual awards and records ==
Robert Reynolds Trophy

The Robert Reynolds Trophy for Carlton's senior best and fairest was awarded to Geoff Southby. It was the second consecutive time Southby had won the award, in only his second year at the club.

Morrish Medal

Vin Catoggio, who played both under 19s and reserves football for Carlton during the season, was a joint-winner of the Morrish Medal, for the under 19s league best-and-fairest. Catoggio polled 23 votes to tie for the award with Ian Kilmartin (North Melbourne).

Murie Cup

Garry Crane was the winner of the Murie Cup, an award which was, at the time, presented by the league to the player who had polled the most combined votes in the Brownlow Medal (seniors), Gardiner Medal (reserves) and Morrish Medal (under 19s), provided he polled votes in at least two of the different grades. Crane, who played in the reserves while recovering from injury for much of the season, polled three Brownlow votes and ten Gardiner votes to win the award.

Representative honours

Three Carlton players represented the winning Victorian team in the 1972 Perth Carnival, which was held from 17 to 24 June at Subiaco Oval during the split Round 12 of the VFL season.

- Alex Jesaulenko, against Tasmania and South Australia
- John Nicholls, against Tasmania and South Australia
- Geoff Southby, against Tasmania, South Australia and Western Australia

Jesaulenko was selected in the All-Australian Team at the conclusion of the Carnival.

=== Player records ===
- Round 21 – Greg Kennedy kicked twelve goals against Hawthorn. It was the most goals in a match by a Carlton player since 1921, when Horrie Clover kicked the club-record thirteen goals.

== Lower grades ==
The Carlton reserves team finished third out of twelve teams, losing in the preliminary final against Hawthorn. After an average start to the season, the reserves team won its last eight home-and-away matches to finish fifth on the ladder with a record of 14–8, only just reaching the final five.

The Under 19s failed to reach the final five.

Reserves finals matches

| **Week** | **Date and local time** | **Opponent** | **Scores** (Carlton's scores indicated in **bold**) | | | **Venue** | **Curtain raiser to** |
| **Week** | **Date and local time** | **Opponent** | Home | Away | Result | **Venue** | **Curtain raiser to** |
| Elimination Final | Saturday, 9 September (11:50 am) | Essendon | 14.9 (93) | **15.10 (100)** | Won by 7 points | VFL Park (A) | StK vs Ess (EF) |
| First semi-final | Saturday, 16 September (11:50 am) | Richmond | 9.15 (69) | **12.8 (80)** | Won by 11 points | VFL Park (A) | Carl vs Rich (2SF) |
| Preliminary Final | Saturday, 23 September (11:50 am) | Hawthorn | 15.11 (101) | **9.14 (68)** | Lost by 33 points | M.C.G. (A) | Carl vs Rich (2SF Rep.) |

== Footnotes ==
:1. The date of the match is not explicitly stated in the reference. It is assumed that this match was played on Sunday, consistent with the other matches on the tour; however, the Herald did not report on the game until Tuesday 7 November, so it is possible that the match was played on Monday 6 November.
