= 1892 FA Cup final =

1892 FA Cup Final
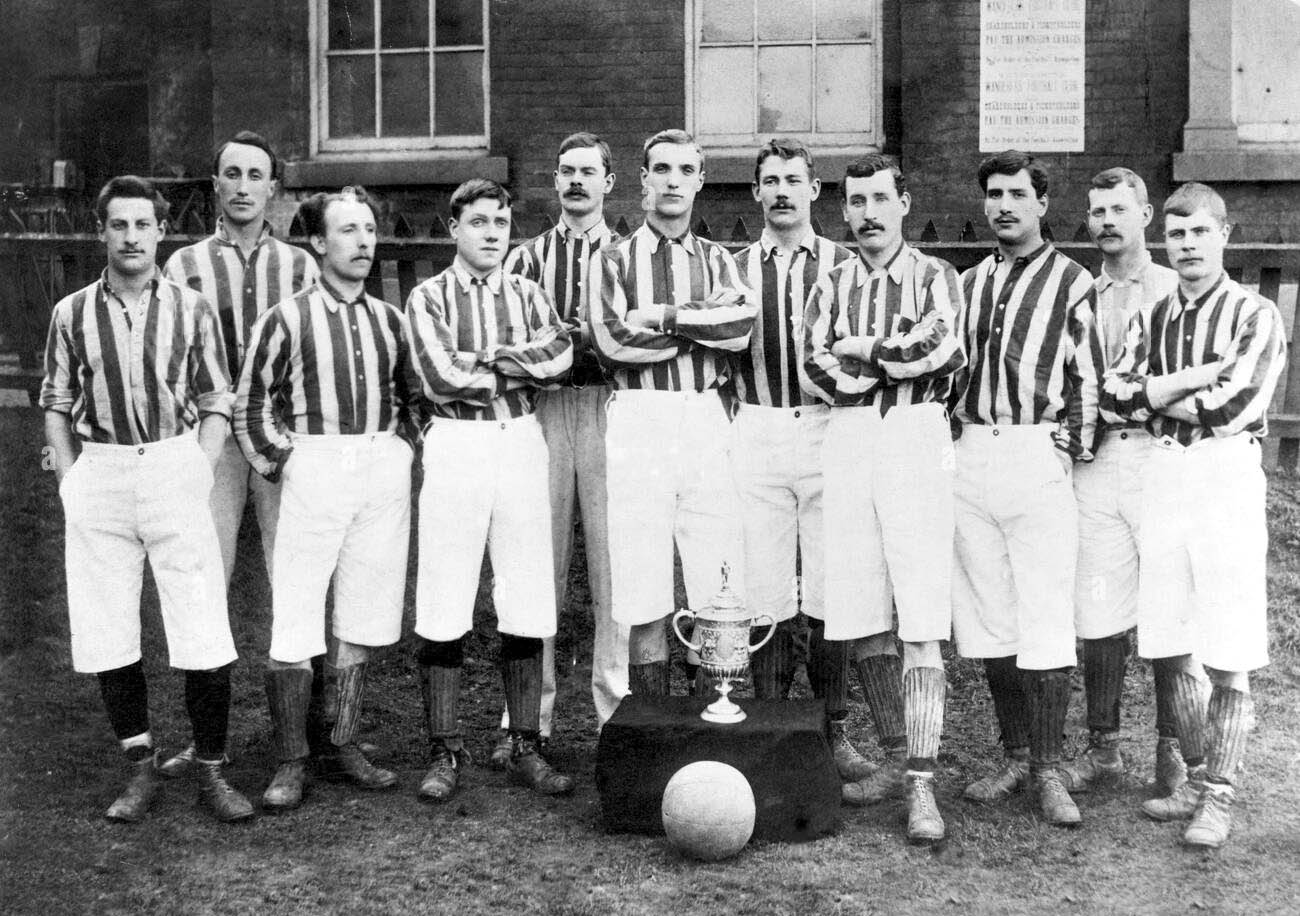
- West Bromwich Albion, winners
- Event: 1891–92 FA Cup
West Bromwich Albion	Aston Villa
3	0
- Date: 19 March 1892
- Venue: Kennington Oval, London
- Referee: Charles Clegg
- Attendance: 32,710
- Weather: Warm, Sunny and cloudless

The 1892 FA Cup final was contested by West Bromwich Albion and Aston Villa at the Kennington Oval. West Bromwich Albion won 3–0, with goals by Alfred Geddes, Sammy Nicholls and Jack Reynolds.

This was the last FA Cup Final to be played at Kennington Oval due to the Surrey Cricket authorities becoming increasingly alarmed at the large crowds now being attracted to the main game in the footballing calendar.

Albions form throughout the league season had been erratic and Villa supporters felt that all they had to do was turn up and the cup was theirs for the taking.

Villa began brightly on a warm, sunny day which helped swell the attendance to almost 33,000, but Albion had an early surprise in store and after just 4 minutes took the lead. Villa fought back hard but they found the Albion keeper Joe Reader in tremendous form. Albion then made it 2–0 at 27 minutes and 10 minutes into the 2nd half, Villa's last hopes disappeared when Albion went 3 up.

Albion defended resolutely to see out the game with a clean-sheet and return with the cup to their Stoney Lane home. This was the first FA Cup Final in which goal-nets were used.

== Match details ==
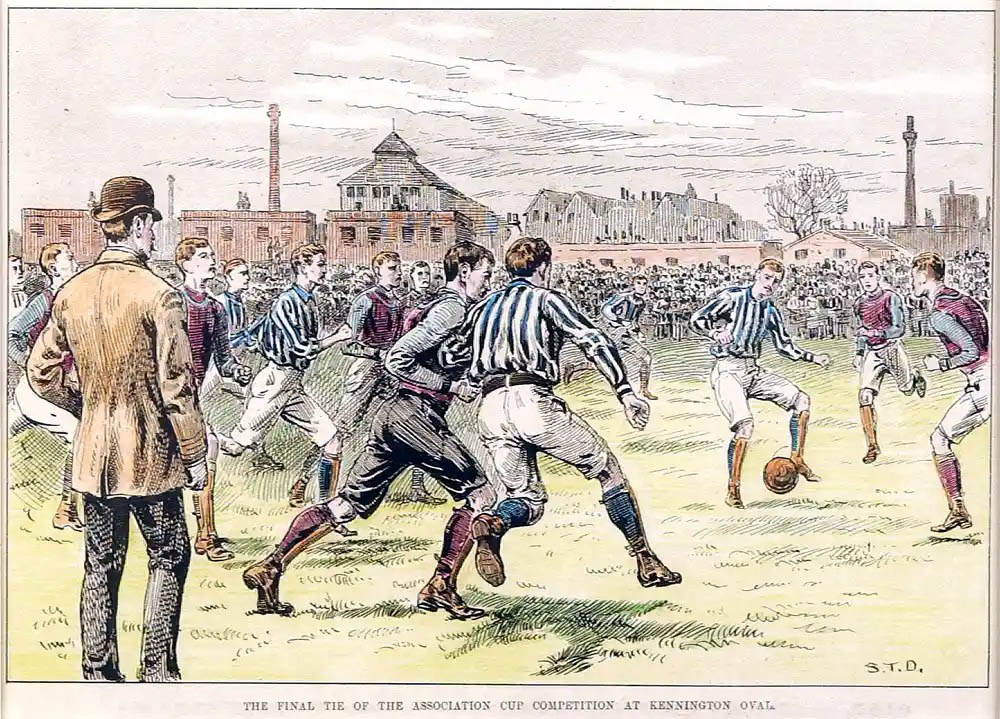
Illustration of the match by Stephen Dadd

19 March 1892	West Bromwich Albion	3–0	Aston Villa	The Oval, Kennington
	Reynolds; Nicholls; Geddes			Attendance: 32,710; Referee: Charles Clegg

W.B. Albion	Aston Villa

GK	(England) Joe Reader
FB	(England) Mark Nicholson
FB	(Scotland) Thomas McCulloch
HB	(England) Jack Reynolds
HB	(England) Charlie Perry
HB	(Scotland) Willie Groves
FW	(England) Billy Bassett
FW	(Scotland) Roddy McLeod
FW	(England) Sammy Nicholls
FW	(England) Tom Pearson
FW	(England) Alfred Geddes
Manager:
(England) Louis Ford

GK	(England) Jimmy Warner
FB	(England) Gershom Cox
FB	(Wales) Walter Evans
HB	(England) Harry Devey
HB	(Scotland) James Cowan
HB	(Scotland) John Baird
FW	(England) Charlie Athersmith
FW	(Scotland) Billy Dickson
FW	(England) John Devey (c)
FW	(Scotland) Lewis Campbell
FW	(England) Dennis Hodgetts
Manager:
(Scotland) George Ramsay

== See also ==
- Aston Villa F.C.–West Bromwich Albion F.C. rivalry
