= Thomas McCulloch (disambiguation) =

Thomas McCulloch (1776–1843) was a Scottish-born Canadian Presbyterian minister, author and educator.

Thomas or Tommy McCulloch may also refer to:

- Thomas McCulloch (sheriff), early Sheriff of Wigtown
- Thomas McCulloch (footballer, born 1868) (1868–?), Scottish footballer
- Tommy McCulloch (footballer, born 1921) (1921–2001), Scottish footballer
- Tommy McCulloch (footballer, born 1934) (1934–2016), Scottish footballer
- Tom McCulloch (born 1964), Australian soccer player
