= Walter Evans (footballer, born 1867) =

Welsh footballer

Personal information
- Full name: Walter Gwynne Evans
- Date of birth: 1867
- Place of birth: Builth, Wales
- Date of death: 10 May 1897 (Aged 29–30)
- Place of death: Builth, Wales
- Position: Full-back

Youth career
- Builth

Senior career*
Years	Team	Apps	(Gls)
1889–1890	Bootle	4	(0)
1890–1893	Aston Villa	61	(0)
1893–1897	Builth		

International career
1890–1892	Wales	3	(0)
- * Club domestic league appearances and goals

Walter Gwynne Evans (1867 – 10 May 1897) was a Welsh footballer who played as a full-back for English clubs, Bootle and Aston Villa in the 1890s. With Villa, he was on the losing side in the 1892 FA Cup Final. He made three appearances for Wales against England, each of which was a defeat.

== Football career ==
Evans was born in Builth, Brecknockshire, the son of the local butcher. As a youth, he excelled at many sports including cricket, rugby and soccer. Having started his career with his local club, he moved to England in 1889 when he joined Bootle; Evans made four appearances for Bootle in the 1889–90 Football Alliance season at the end of which Bootle finished as runners-up.

Evans made his international debut while still a Bootle player when he was called up for the British Home Championship match against England played at Wrexham's Racecourse Ground on 15 March 1890. England were scheduled to play two international matches on the same day and fielded their strongest side against Wales with a slightly weaker team going to Belfast to play Ireland; England won both matches, with Edmund Currey scoring twice on his debut and Tinsley Lindley continuing his run of goals in a 3–0 victory over Wales.

In July 1890, Evans joined Aston Villa where he became a regular member of the team. He made a total of 23 appearances in 1891–92 and 28 in the following year helping Villa to reach the FA Cup Final against local rivals, West Bromwich Albion. Despite being favourites going into the game, Villa lost 3–0 with Albion's goals coming from Geddes, Nicholls and Reynolds.

Evans made two further international appearances, both against England, with a 4–1 defeat in March 1891 and a 2–0 defeat a year later. In his 1891 assessment by the Football Association of Wales, Evans was described as "a very good back, tackles unflinchingly and a safe kick; (has) done himself credit".

Evans remained with Villa for a further season before returning to Builth in August 1893. He continued to turn out for Builth until his death in 1897.

=== International appearances ===
Evans made three appearances for Wales as follows:

Date	Venue	Opponent	Result	Goals	Competition
18 March 1890	Racecourse Ground, Wrexham	England	1–3	0	British Home Championship
7 March 1891	Newcastle Road, Sunderland	England	1–4	0	British Home Championship
5 March 1892	Racecourse Ground, Wrexham	England	0–2	0	British Home Championship

Win	Draw	Loss

== Non-football career ==
On returning to Builth, Evans became landlord of the Lamb Inn. This public house became the headquarters and changing rooms of the Builth Football Club.

In May 1897, Evans caught a chill while attending a funeral and died within a few days. His death was described as "a calamity for the Builth club".

== Honours ==
Aston Villa

- FA Cup finalists: 1892
