= Australian rules football exhibition matches =

Exhibition matches in Australian rules football have been used to promote the game as a demonstration sport outside of its heartlands in Australia.

Since its Victorian origin in 1859, the sport's beginnings in other states and territories (then separate colonies including New Zealand) has contributed to such matches being played since the 1880s, while the sports origins in other countries has been sometimes attributed to organised and scratch matches held since World War I.

== Exhibition matches played outside Australia ==
=== World War I ===
During World War I, Australian troops organised matches across Europe, in countries with the highest profile matches been played in the United Kingdom since 1916 but also one-off matches in other countries including Belgium and France (1919).

==== Pioneer Exhibition Game in London ====
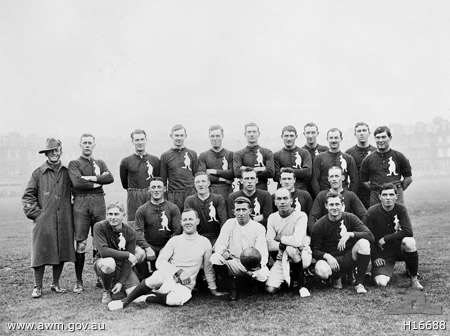
The Australian Training Units Team

On Saturday 28 October 1916, the former Olympic champion swimmer and the later Lord Mayor of Melbourne, Lieutenant Frank Beaurepaire, organised an Australian Rules football match between two teams of Australian servicemen in aid of the British and French Red Cross.

The match was promoted as a "Pioneer Exhibition Game of Australian Football in London". It was held at Queen's Club, West Kensington before an estimated crowd of 3,000, which included the (then) Prince of Wales (later King Edward VIII), and King Manuel II of Portugal.

An Australian football match (an Australian Division v. Training Groups) will be played at Queen's Club, West Kensington, tomorrow, at 3 p.m., in aid of the British and French Red Cross Funds. The game, played by 18 players a side, will show how Australians have combined "Soccer" and Rugby.
The Times, Friday, 27 October 1916.

The members of the competing teams, Australian Training Units and The Third Australian Divisional Team, were all highly skilled footballers, the majority of which had already played senior football in their respective states.

A news film was taken at the match.

In order to celebrate the match Beaurepaire commissioned a set of team photographs that were inserted into a mounting board decorated with a British Union Jack and an Australian Red Ensign, that had "Australian Football in London. Pioneer Exhibition Game. At Queen's Club, West Kensington. Saturday 28th Oct. 1916" at its head, and "Organizer of Match & Donor of Photos to Club Lieut. Frank Beaurepaire" at its foot.

=== World War II ===
During World War II, exhibition matches were played by servicemen in several countries, especially in South East Asia and also in the United Kingdom. Countries included Papua New Guinea, Indonesia, Malaysia and Vietnam. Each of these matches drew a number of interested local spectators.

=== 1960s – 1990s ===
After the 1960s, the Victorian Football League, realising that finding new markets were essential to the prosperity of the competition began to belatedly pursue a series of international exhibition matches to raise the profile of the game overseas.

The longest and most persistent of these was Great Britain, which was seen as an opportunity primarily due to the high number of ex-patriate Australians living there, and the availability of cricket grounds.

The most notable series of exhibition matches was staged by the Carlton Football Club in 1972. Club president George Harris organised for Carlton and an All-Stars team of players from other senior teams around Australia to go on a three-week World Tour, which saw matches played in London, Athens and Singapore.

Serious efforts to grow the game were not realised until the 1980s. Games played in this decade began to spawn infant leagues in Japan named the "Aussie Bowl", the United States of America and Canada, which have been represented at the Australian Football International Cup since 2002.

During the 1990s, regular exhibition matches became part of the growth strategy of the renamed Australian Football League, which began to realise that the effects of globalisation would threaten the future of the sport in the face of world sports like soccer. The focus of the AFL in this decade was New Zealand and South Africa.

=== 2000s – present ===
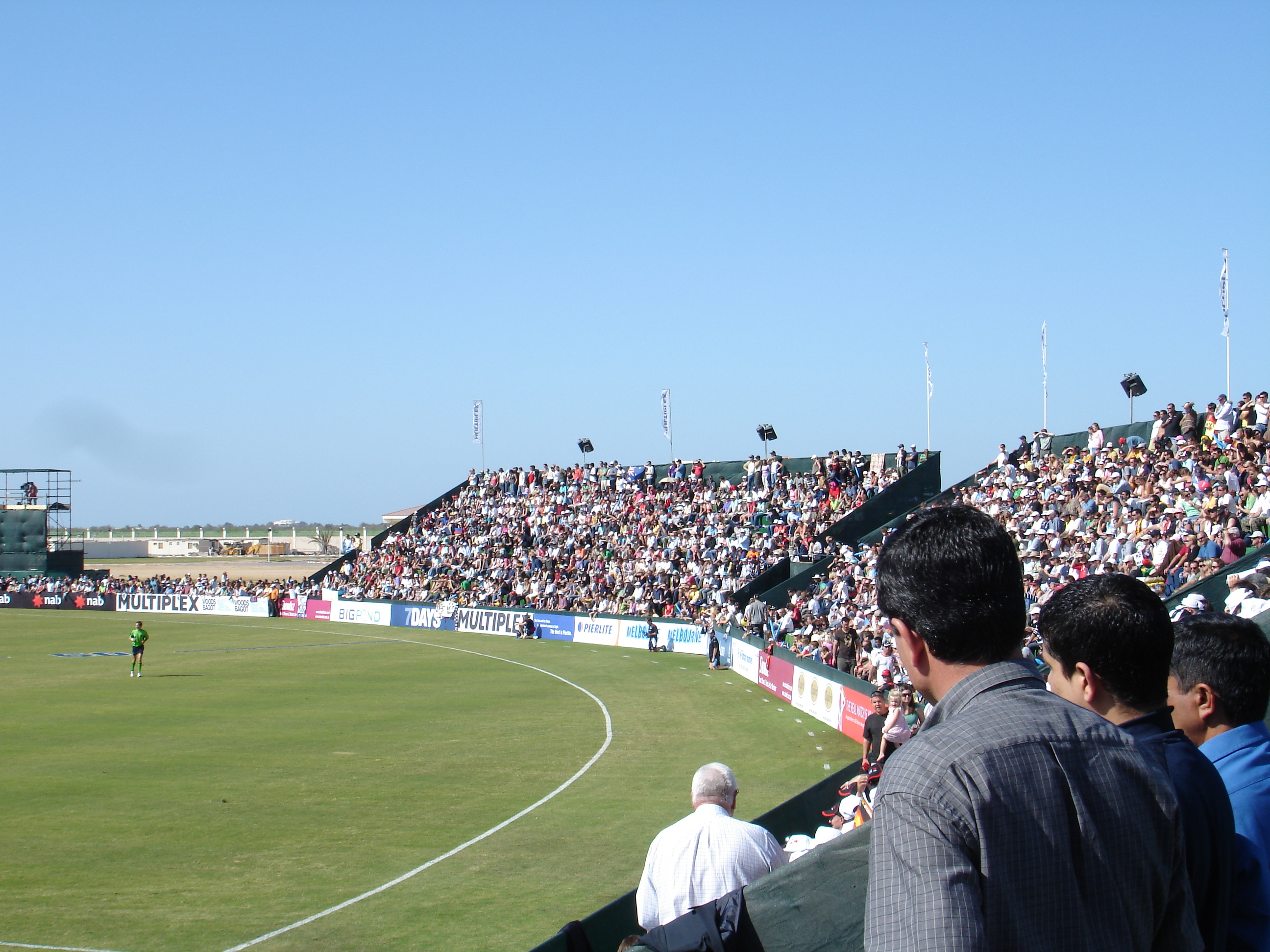
2008 NAB Cup match between Collingwood and Adelaide at Ghantoot Racing and Polo Club, Abu Dhabi, UAE.

Exhibition matches have been regularly scheduled for The Oval in London, which has in the past been an event for ex-patriate Australians. The event has been annual as the "AFL Challenge Trophy" since 2002 and although it has not always been annual event, a small amount of interest in the games has grown amongst locals.

Since sell-out game in Los Angeles, United States in early 2006, club officials of the Sydney Swans have called for regular games (similar to the London matches) including the possibility of a premiership match.

The WAFL announced intentions to play an exhibition match in Mumbai, India in late 2006 between the grand finalists. However this match did not go ahead.

In November 2005, AFL club Melbourne made an announcement that it was investigating playing an exhibition match in 2006 or 2007 in the Chinese metropolis Tianjin, with Beijing or Shanghai possible alternative hosts. The match was delayed by the Melbourne Football Club's CEO.

In February 2006, AFL club Essendon's CEO indicated the possibility of an exhibition match in Japan in 2007 to mark 20 years since the last Aussie Bowl between the Bombers and Hawthorn.

In August 2008, the AFL announced it intended to schedule two games in India with Feroz Shah Kotla in New Delhi and Wankhede Stadium in Mumbai being considered as well as one game in Miami, Florida USA in early March.

=== List of official Australian rules football exhibition matches played outside Australia ===
Exhibition matches
| Date | Location | Venue | Competition | Teams | | | | Attendance | Reference(s) |
| Date | Location | Venue | Competition | Winner | Score | Opponent | Score | Attendance | Reference(s) |
|---|---|---|---|---|---|---|---|---|---|
| 20/10/1963 | Honolulu, USA | Hickam Air Force Field | Post season exhibition | Melbourne | 17.21 (123) | Geelong | 15.21 (111) | 1,500 | |
| 26/10/1963 | San Francisco, USA | Big Rec Field | Post season exhibition | Melbourne | 10.11 (71) | Geelong | 9.12 (66) | 3,500 | |
| 31/10/1967 | London, UK | Crystal Palace National Sports Centre | Australian Football World Tour | Australia | 101 | Britain (expat) | 75 | 1,000 | |
| 8/10/1969 | Port Moresby, Papua New Guinea | South Pacific Oval | Tour of PNG | St Kilda | 9.17 (71) | PNG | 1.6 (12) | 5,000 | |
| 18/10/1969 | New Delhi, India | National Stadium | WAFL post season exhibition | Subiaco | 126 | East Perth | 121 | 3,500 | |
| 19/10/1969 | New Delhi, India | National Stadium | WAFL post season exhibition | East Perth | 24.20 (164) | Subiaco | 12.10 (82) | | |
| 29/10/1972 | London, UK | The Oval | Postseason World Tour | Carlton | 12.12 (84) | All-Stars | 10.18 (78) | 9,000 | |
| 5/11/1972 | Athens, Greece | | Postseason World Tour | All-Stars | 19.13 (127) | Carlton | 19.10 (124) | 3,000 | |
| 12/11/1972 | Singapore | | Postseason World Tour | All-Stars | 11.11 (77) | Carlton | 9.11 (65) | 8,500 | |
| 11/10/1976 | Port Moresby, Papua New Guinea | Sir Hubert Murray Stadium | Tour of PNG | North Melbourne | 18.12 (120) | PNG | 11.10 (76) | 8,000 (Note: VFL premiers North Melbourne took on PNG following a curtain raiser exhibition match between PNG and Nauru.) | |
| 12/10/1986 | London, UK | The Oval | Post season exhibition Courage Challenge Cup | North Melbourne | 20.13 (133) | Carlton | 12.16 (88) | 15,000 | |
| 3/11/1986 | Yokohama, Japan | Yokohama Stadium | Post season exhibition Aussie Bowl | Hawthorn | 22.17 (140) | Carlton | 13.18 (96) | 25,000 | |
| 9/10/1987 | Vancouver, Canada | B.C. Place | Post season exhibition Fosters International Cup | Melbourne | 20.19 (139) | Sydney | 12.9 (81) | 32,789 | |
| 11/10/1987 | London, UK | The Oval | Post season exhibition Fosters International Cup | North Melbourne | 16.8 (104) | Carlton | 13.13 (91) | 14,000 | |
| 18/10/1987 | Vancouver, Canada | B.C. Place | Post season exhibition Fosters International Cup (Final) | Melbourne | 19.13 (127) | North Melbourne | 16.55 (111) | 7,980 | |
| 25/10/1987 | Yokohama, Japan | Yokohama Stadium | Post season exhibition Aussie Bowl | Hawthorn | 20.14 (134) | Essendon | 11.9 (75) | 13,000 | |
| 8/10/1988 | Miami Gardens, USA | Joe Robbie Stadium | Post season exhibition Fosters International Cup | Collingwood | 18.16 (124) | Geelong | 10.18 (78) | 7,000 | |
| 9/10/1988 | London, UK | The Oval | Post season exhibition Fosters International Cup | Hawthorn | 9.14 (68) | Carlton | 6.11 (47) | 10,000 | |
| 16/10/1988 | Toronto, Canada | Varsity Stadium | Post season exhibition Fosters International Cup (Final) | Collingwood | 18.11 (119) | Hawthorn | 15.15 (105) | 18,571 | |
| 12/10/1989 | Toronto, Canada | SkyDome | Post season exhibition Foster's International Cup | Melbourne | 14.19 (103) | Geelong | 13.12 (90) | 24,639 | |
| 14/10/1989 | Miami Gardens, USA | Joe Robbie Stadium | Post season exhibition Foster's International Cup | Essendon | 18.16 (124) | Hawthorn | 15.20 (110) | 10,069 | |
| 22/10/1989 | London, UK | The Oval | Post season exhibition Foster's International Cup (final) | Melbourne | 12.10 (82) | Essendon | 6.10 (46) | 12,000 | |
| 12/10/1990 | Portland, USA | Civic Stadium | Post season exhibition Fosters Cup | Melbourne | 24.16 (160) | West Coast | 11.13 (79) | 14,787 | |
| 14/10/1990 | London, UK | The Oval | Post season exhibition Fosters Cup | Collingwood | 19.9 (123) | Essendon | 13.12 (90) | 9,000 | |
| 5/10/1991 | Auckland, NZ | Western Springs Stadium | Post season exhibition | Geelong | 12.11 (83) | St Kilda | 10.10 (70) | 6,500 | |
| 13/10/1991 | London, UK | The Oval | Post season exhibition Fosters Cup | West Coast | 14.12 (96) | Hawthorn | 10.6 (66) | 11,000 | |
| 16/10/1994 | London, UK | The Oval | Post season exhibition Double-header | West Coast | 14.12 (96) | Adelaide | 8.8 (56) | 6,000 | |
| 16/10/1994 | London, UK | The Oval | Post season exhibition Double-header | Richmond | 14.20 (104) | Carlton | 13.5 (83) | 6,000 | |
| 12/10/1997 | London, UK | The Oval | Post season exhibition | West Coast | 11.7 (73) | Collingwood | 8.7 (55) | 11,000 | |
| 22/02/1998 | Cape Town, South Africa | Newlands Cricket Ground | 1998 Ansett Australia Cup; Preseason Cup (round 1) | Brisbane Lions | 18.17 (125) | Fremantle | 16.7 (103) | 10,123 | |
| 1/03/1998 | Wellington, New Zealand | Basin Reserve | 1998 Ansett Australia Cup; Preseason Cup (round 1) | Melbourne | 15.15 (105) | Sydney | 14.9 (93) | 7,820 | |
| 10/10/1998 | London, UK | The Oval | Post season exhibition | Western Bulldogs | 15.5 (95) | St Kilda | 10.12 (72) | 12,000 | |
| 9/10/1999 | London, UK | The Oval | Post season exhibition | Essendon | 11.6 (72) | Hawthorn | 10.9 (69) | 12,000+ | |
| 29/01/2000 | Wellington, NZ | Westpac Stadium | 2000 Ansett Australia Cup; Preseason Cup (group stage match) | Western Bulldogs | 13.7 (85) | Hawthorn | 4.14 (38) | 11,666 | |
| 7/10/2000 | London, UK | The Oval | Post season exhibition | Melbourne | 5.10 (40) | Adelaide | 3.3 (21) | 4,500 | |
| 17/2/2001 | Wellington, New Zealand | Westpac Stadium | 2001 Ansett Australia Cup; Preseason Cup (group stage match) | Brisbane Lions | 16.18 (114) | Adelaide | 10.13 (73) | 7,500 | |
| 12/10/2002 | London, UK | The Oval | Post season exhibition | Richmond | 12.7 (79) | Essendon | 7.6 (48) | 13,000 | |
| 11/10/2003 | London, UK | The Oval | Post season exhibition | Fremantle | 11.3 (69) | Collingwood | 7.8 (50) | 12,847 | |
| 8/10/2005 | London, UK | The Oval | Post season exhibition | Fremantle | 13.12 (90) | West Coast | 11.7 (73) | 18,884 | |
| 15/1/2006 | Los Angeles, USA | UCLA Intramural Field | Preseason exhibition | North Melbourne | 13.8 (86) | Sydney | 6.2 (38) | 3,000 | |
| 21/10/2006 | London, UK | The Oval | Postseason exhibition AFL Challenge Trophy | Geelong | 13.10 (88) | Port Adelaide | 10.7 (67) | 12,129 | |
| 2/02/2008 | Centurion, South Africa | SuperSport Park | Preseason practice match | Fremantle | 11.12 (78) | Carlton | 9.10 (64) | 5,222 | |
| 9/02/2008 | Abu Dhabi, UAE | Ghantoot Polo and Racing Club | 2008 NAB Cup; Preseason Cup (round 1) | Adelaide | 4.15.10 (136) | Collingwood | 0.7.13 (55) | 6,102 | |
| 17/10/2010 | Shanghai, China | Jiangwan Stadium | Postseason exhibition Shanghai Showdown | Melbourne | 12.12 (84) | Brisbane Lions | 11.13 (79) | 7,100 | |
| 3/11/2012 | London, UK | The Oval | Postseason exhibition AFL European Challenge | Port Adelaide | 14.4 (88) | Western Bulldogs | 13.9 (87) | 10,000 | |

Additional references: International Australian Football Council, SurreyCricket.com, Matchday programmes, VFL/AFL

== Exhibition matches played outside Victoria ==
Australian rules football was introduced early in the 1880s to most of the states of Australia through a series of exhibition matches.

Leagues quickly formed in all states, and in many of these states, the code has become the most popular sport.

Although drawing significant crowds and interest early, the states of Queensland and New South Wales elected at official level to adopt the rugby codes in 1908. This was widely recognised as being due to the game's association with the tag "Melbourne Rules" or "Victorian Rules" and the fierce rivalry that Sydney has with Melbourne. With a lack of players, and grounds, support for Australian rules football decreased dramatically.

Support in these states has since grown in recent years, with local clubs established in the national competition in both Queensland and New South Wales during the 1980s. Although the game is followed by the majority of the Australian population and states, there are still many in New South Wales (the most populous state) that associate the game with Melbourne or "the game they play in Victoria". For other states without teams in the national competition, the AFL has tried to maintain participation through regular exhibition games.

=== Regional AFL exhibition matches ===
In 2005, to bring the game to regional centres, the AFL began a series of pre-season practice matches before the Wizard Cup called the Wizard Regional Challenge Series.

The 2005 series included such Morwell, Port Lincoln, Joondalup, Lavington, Carrara, Alice Springs, Newcastle and Bendigo with a total attendance of 117,552. Features of the competition included a game between Collingwood vs Sydney in Newcastle in front of 5,002 spectators and Essendon vs Geelong in Bendigo in front of 13,000.

=== AFL exhibition matches played in New South Wales ===
Although the Sydney Swans Australian football club are based in Sydney, the AFL holds an annual exhibition match between the Essendon and Sydney Swans at the North Sydney Oval. Regional NAB Challenge matches have been played in Newcastle and Albury.

=== AFL exhibition matches played in Australian Capital Territory ===
With no team in the national competition, and heavy competition with both rugby league and rugby union, the VFL/AFL has long shown interest in the nation's capital, largest inland city and 8th largest urban area. The city of Canberra and the Australian Capital Territory, formed in the 1920s and due to proximity generally followed the lead of New South Wales to adopt rugby league, which remains the most popular sport in the city. Rugby union also has some followers. Since 2001, the Kangaroos Football Club have been working to build up a local supporter base by playing home games at Manuka Oval. Crowds at Manuka have averaged around 10,000, with a record of 14,891 set in 2004 for the Kangaroos vs Sydney Swans.

=== AFL exhibition matches played in Northern Territory ===
With no team in the national competition, and heavy competition with rugby league, the VFL/AFL has maintained a strong following in the Northern Territory through exhibition matches. Like the Kangaroos in Canberra, the Western Bulldogs have recently experimented with home games in Darwin at Marrara Oval. Other exhibition matches have included the Aboriginal All-Stars in pre-season practice matches against various AFL clubs. The games at Marrara have averaged about 10,000 spectators, with a record of 17,500 witnessing the Aboriginal All-Stars vs Carlton match in 2002. Alice Springs has also hosted pre-season matches. In 2004, an AFL pre-season Regional Challenge match between Collingwood Football Club and Port Adelaide Football Club at Traeger Park attracted a sell-out crowd of 10,000.

=== AFL exhibition matches played in Queensland ===
Before the advent of the Brisbane Bears, VFL/AFL exhibition matches were occasionally played at the Brisbane Cricket Ground.
Exhibition matches have more recently been played in the Gold Coast and Cairns.

== See also ==
- 1916 Pioneer Exhibition Game
