= The Oval =

International cricket ground in Kennington, London, England

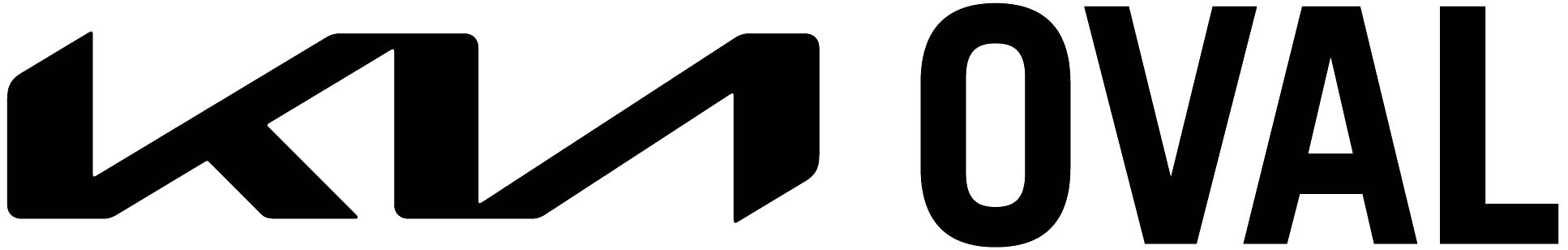

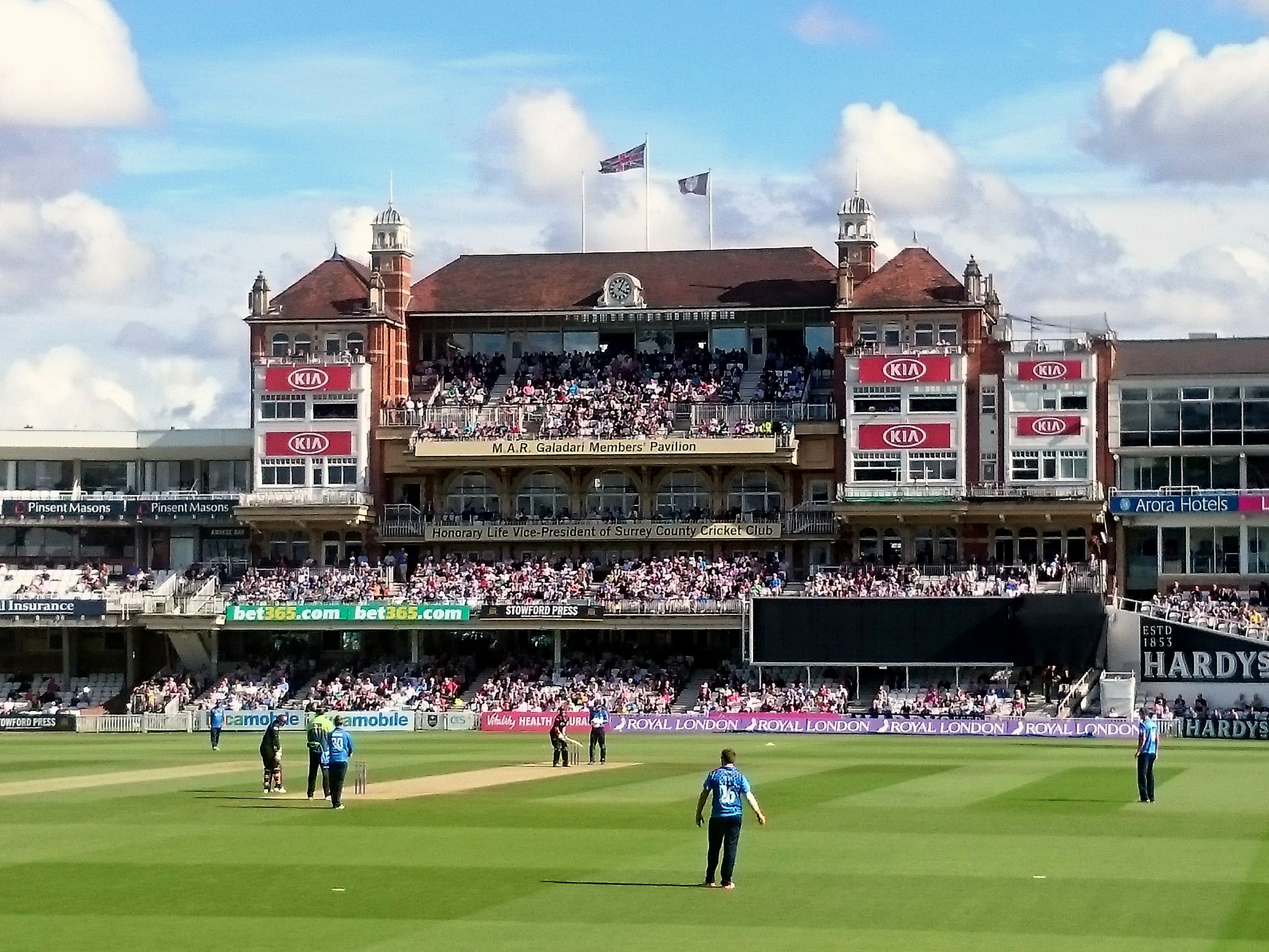
- The Oval Pavilion as seen in 2015
- Interactive map of The Oval

Ground information
- Location: Kennington, London, SE11
- Country: England
- Coordinates: 51°29′1″N 0°6′54″W
- Establishment: 1845; 181 years ago
- Capacity: 27,500
- Owner: Duchy of Cornwall
- Operator: Surrey County Cricket Club
- Tenants: List: Surrey (1845–present); England football team (1872–89); England rugby team (1872–79); England cricket team (1880–present)
- Website: kiaoval.com
- End names
- Vauxhall End Pavilion End

International information
- First men's Test: 6–8 September 1880: England v Australia
- Last men's Test: 17–21 June 2026: England v New Zealand
- First men's ODI: 7 September 1973: England v West Indies
- Last men's ODI: 3 June 2025: England v West Indies
- First men's T20I: 28 June 2007: England v West Indies
- Last men's T20I: 30 May 2024: England v Pakistan
- First women's Test: 10–13 July 1937: England v Australia
- Last women's Test: 24–28 July 1976: England v Australia
- First women's T20I: 19 June 2009: England v Australia
- Last women's T20I: 2 July 2026: England v South Africa

Team information
Surrey	(1846–present)
Corinthian-Casuals (football)	(1950–1963)
- As of 13 July 2024; Source: ESPNcricinfo

The Oval, for sponsorship reasons named the Kia Oval, is an international cricket ground in Kennington, located in the borough of Lambeth, in south London. The Oval has been the home ground of Surrey County Cricket Club since it was opened in 1845. It was the first ground in England to host international Test cricket in September 1880. The final Test match of the English season is traditionally played there.

In addition to cricket history, The Oval has hosted a number of other historically significant sporting events. In 1870, it staged the first representative football match between England and Scotland, although this is not deemed to be an official international by FIFA. It hosted the first FA Cup final in 1872, as well as those between 1874 and 1892. In 1876, it held both the England v. Wales and England v. Scotland rugby international matches and, in 1877, rugby's first varsity match. It also hosted the finals of the ICC Champions Trophy in 2004 and 2017, as well as the 2023 World Test Championship final.

== History ==
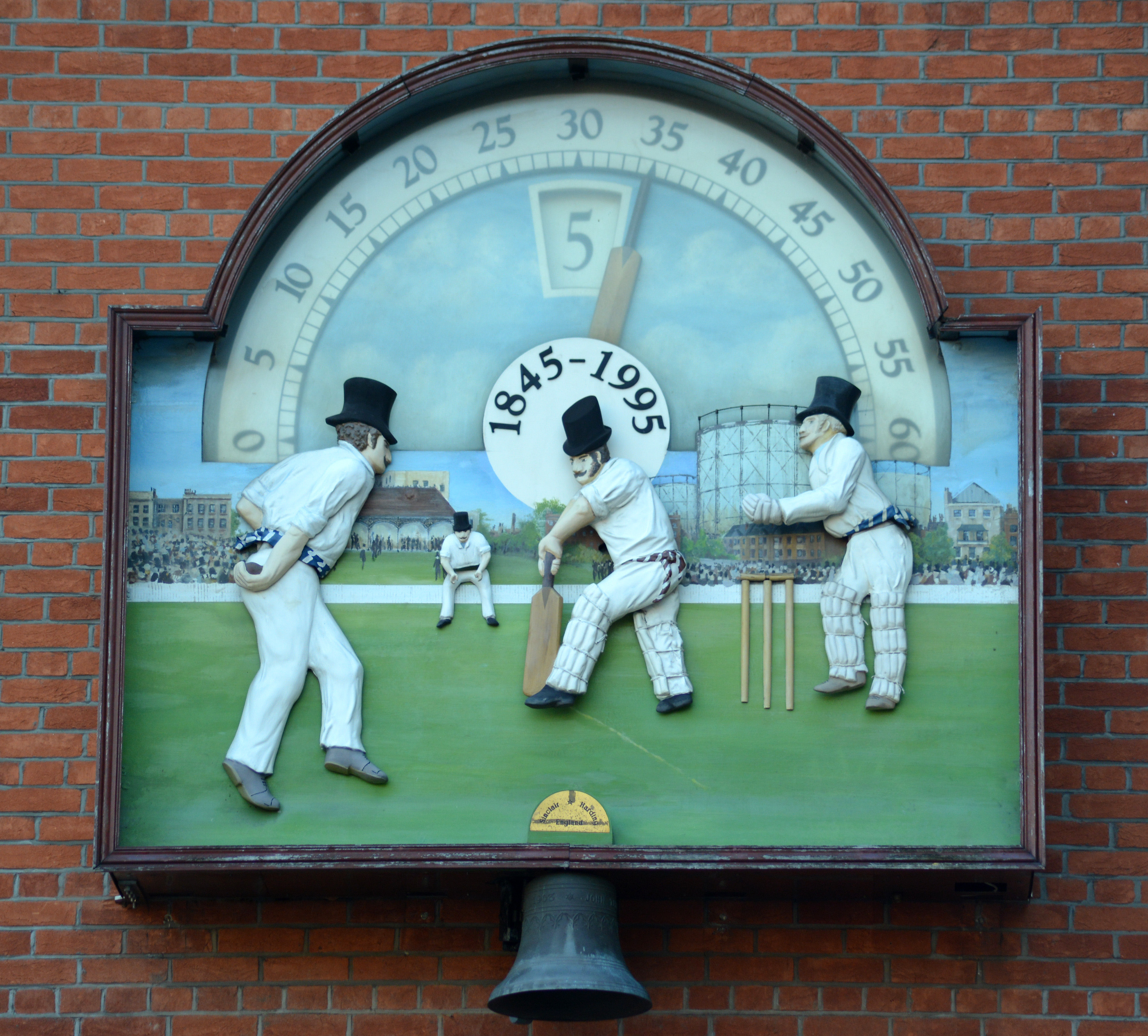
The clock by the Members' entrance to the pavilion

The Oval is built on part of the former Kennington Common. Cricket matches were played on the common throughout the early 18th century. The earliest recorded match was the London v Dartford match in June 1724. However, as the common was also used regularly for public executions of those convicted at the Surrey Assizes (it was the south London equivalent of Tyburn), cricket matches had moved away to the Artillery Ground by the 1740s. Kennington Common was eventually enclosed in the mid-19th century under a scheme sponsored by the royal family.

In 1844, the site of the Kennington Oval was a cabbage patch and market garden owned by the Duchy of Cornwall. The Duchy was willing to lease the land for the purpose of a cricket ground, and on 10 March 1845 the first lease, which the club later assumed, was issued to Mr. William Houghton (then president of the progenitor Montpelier Cricket Club) by the Otter Trustees who held the land from the Duchy "to convert it into a subscription cricket ground", for 31 years at a rent of £120 per annum plus taxes amounting to £20. The original contract for turfing The Oval cost £300; the 10,000 grass turfs came from Tooting Common and were laid in the spring of 1845 allowing for the first cricket match to be played in May 1845. Hence, Surrey County Cricket Club (SCCC) was established in 1845.

The popularity of the ground was immediate and the strength of the SCCC grew. On 3 May 1875 the club acquired the remainder of the leasehold for a further term of 31 years from the Otter Trustees for the sum of £2,800.

In 1868, 20,000 spectators gathered at The Oval for the first game of the 1868 Aboriginal cricket tour of England, the first tour of England by any foreign side. Thanks to C.W. Alcock, the Secretary of Surrey from 1872 to 1907, the first Test match in England was played at The Oval in 1880 between England and Australia. The Oval, thereby, became the second ground to stage a Test, after Melbourne Cricket Ground (MCG). In 1882, Australia won the Test by seven runs within two days. The Sporting Times printed a mocking obituary notice for English cricket, which led to the creation of the Ashes trophy, which is still contested whenever England plays Australia. The first Test double century was scored at The Oval in 1884 by Australia's Billy Murdoch.

Surrey's ground is noted as having the first artificial lighting at a sports arena, in the form of gas-lamps, dating to 1889. The current pavilion was completed in time for the 1898 season. In 1907, South Africa became the second visiting Test team to play a Test match at the ground. In 1928, the West Indies played its first Test match at The Oval, followed by New Zealand in 1931. In 1936, India became the fifth foreign visiting Test side to play at The Oval, followed by Pakistan in 1954 and Sri Lanka in 1998. Zimbabwe, Bangladesh, Afghanistan and Ireland have yet to play a Test match at The Oval.

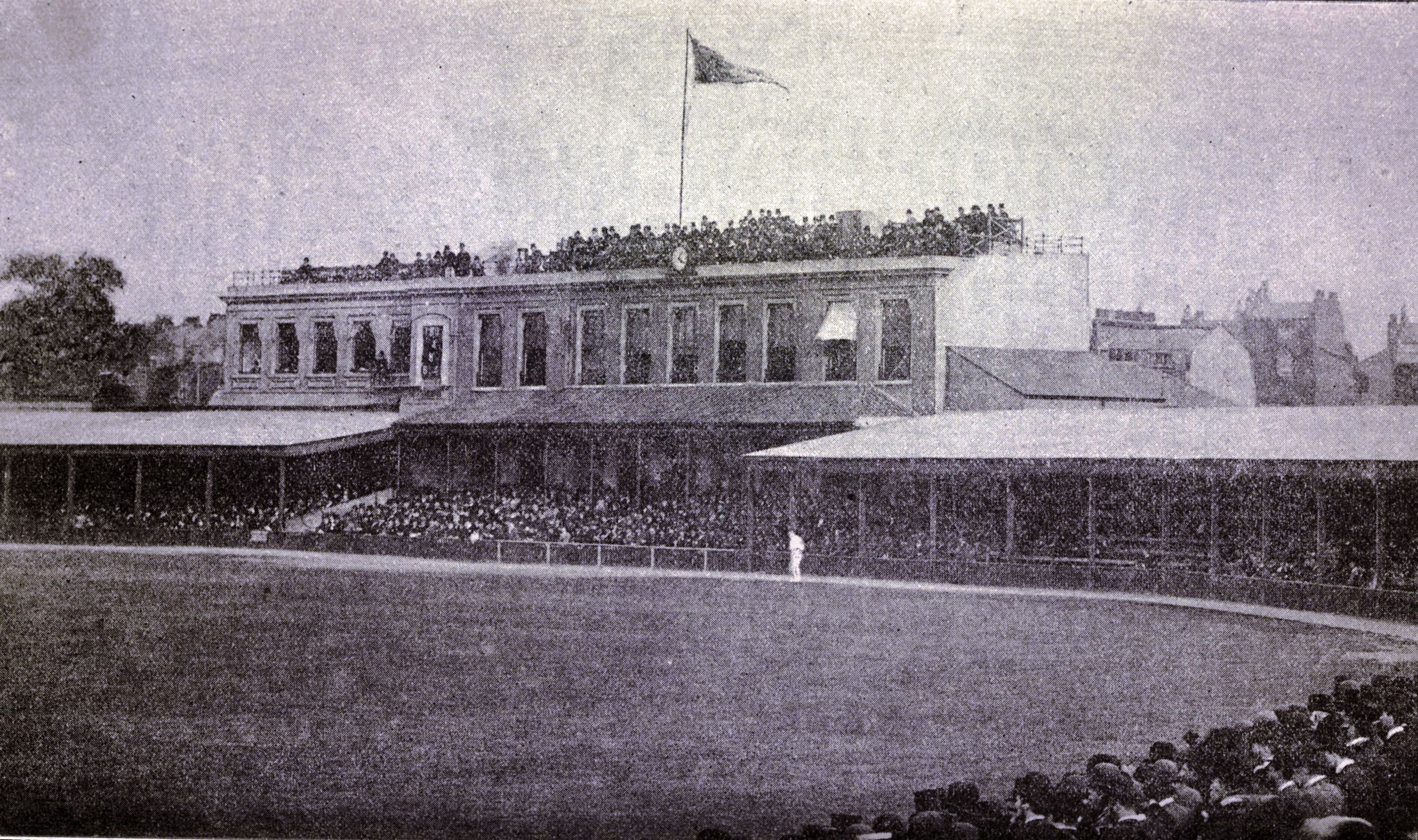
The pavilion end in 1891

The Oval is referenced by the poet Philip Larkin in his poem about the First World War, "MCMXIV". During World War II, The Oval was requisitioned, initially housing anti-aircraft searchlights. It was then turned into a prisoner-of-war camp, intended to hold enemy parachutists. However, as they never came, The Oval was never actually used for this purpose. The first One Day International match at this venue was played on 7 September 1973 between England and West Indies. It hosted matches of the 1975, 1979, 1983, and 1999 World Cups. It also hosted five of the fifteen matches in the 2004 ICC Champions Trophy, including the final. The Oval once held the record for the largest playing area of any Test venue in the world. That record has since been surpassed by Gaddafi Stadium in Pakistan, although The Oval remains the largest in Great Britain.

Billionaire Paul Getty, who had a great affinity for cricket and was at one time SCCC President, built a replica of The Oval on his Wormsley Park estate. The famous gasholders just outside the ground were built around 1853. With the gasholders long disused, there was much speculation as to whether they should be demolished; however, many believe they are an integral part of The Oval's urban landscape and, therefore, their future looks secure. In 2016 the main gasholder was given official protected status as a historically important industrial structure.

On 20 August 2006, The Oval saw the first time a team forfeited a Test match. Pakistan were upset after umpires Darrell Hair and Billy Doctrove awarded five penalty runs to the opposition and changed the ball after ruling that the team had tampered with it on the fourth day of the final Test against England. Pakistan debated the matter during the tea break and then refused to come out for the final session in protest. By the time they relented and decided to resume, the umpires had already called time on the match and awarded the game to England by default.

The Oval hosted its hundredth Test, against South Africa, on 27 July 2017, becoming the fourth Test venue in the world after Lord's, MCG and SCG to do so. Moeen Ali also became the first player to ever take a Test hat-trick at The Oval, bowling out South Africa in the second innings to win the match. In Tests, the highest team score at The Oval is 903/7 declared by England against Australia on 20 August 1938. The leading run scorers are Len Hutton (1,521 runs), Alastair Cook (1,217 runs) and Graham Gooch (1,097 runs). The leading wicket takers are Ian Botham (52 wickets), James Anderson (50 wickets) and Derek Underwood & Stuart Broad (45 wickets each).

In ODIs, the highest team score at The Oval is 398/5 by New Zealand against England on 12 June 2015. The leading ODI run scorers are Eoin Morgan (705 runs), Joe Root (552 runs) and Marcus Trescothick (528 runs) . The leading ODI wicket takers are James Anderson (30 wickets) and Darren Gough (13 wickets). In 2021, the Oval Invincibles were formed as a team in the newly launched The Hundred competition. The initial games in both the men's and women's competition were played on the ground.

== End names ==
The north-western end of The Oval is traditionally known as the Vauxhall End, as it is nearer to the district of Vauxhall and its railway station. The opposite end (south-east) is known as the Pavilion End as it is the location of the Members' Pavilion.

== 21st-century redevelopment ==
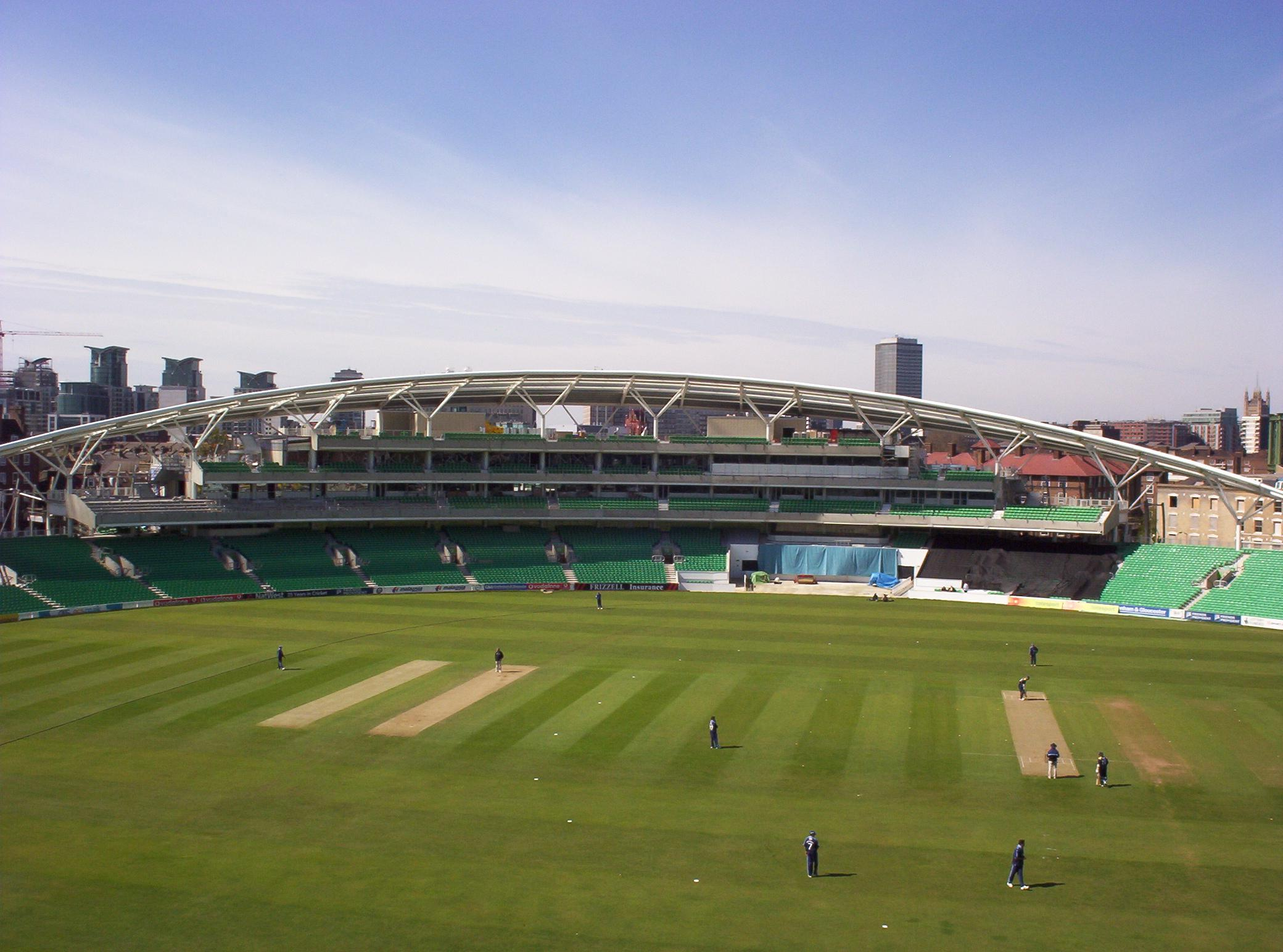
Surrey v Yorkshire (OCS stand in background)

At the end of the 2002 cricket season, Surrey started redeveloping the Vauxhall End. The development included demolishing the outdated Surridge, Fender, Jardine, and Peter May north stands, and creating in their place a single four-tier grandstand. From completion in May 2005 until 2020 it was known as the OCS stand, as it was sponsored by OCS Group. As of the start of the 2021 season it is now known as the JM Finn stand because of a sponsorship deal with JM Finn. This work increased ground capacity to around 23,000.

In January 2007, Surrey CCC, announced plans to increase capacity by a further 2,000 seats, this time by redeveloping the Pavilion End. The Lock, Laker, and Peter May south stands were to be replaced by a new stand, which would have a hotel backing on to it. The Surrey Tavern at the entrance to the ground would be demolished, and a new pedestrian plaza would be created in its place, improving access to the ground and opening up views of the historic pavilion. These plans were delayed by objections raised by the Health & Safety Executive as the ground is close to a gasometer. Planning permission was eventually granted, but development did not proceed due to the 2008 financial crisis.

In 2009, four masts of semi-permanent telescopic floodlights costing £3.7m were installed for use in late-day through evening matches. The floodlights were especially designed to comply with strict residential planning regulations to lessen their visual impact and any light overspill to residents, as well as to improve the game experience within the ground by reducing excess glare that can affect players, umpires, broadcasters and spectators. Precision reflector systems were fitted for tight beam control to decrease overspill and direct light only where needed. Each mast was made extendable to a maximum height of 47.6 metres (156 ft) and, when not in use, retractable to 30 m (98 ft). At the end of each season, all four masts can be removed and stored away.

After the 2013 season, a new project was started to add 'wings' to either side of the OCS Stand at the Vauxhall End of the ground. The development was finished in time for the start of the 2014 season. Each 'wing' added 500 seats, increasing the capacity from 23,500 to 24,500.

In September 2015, the Peter May and Tony Lock stands were demolished, to be replaced by a single new and much larger stand named after Peter May. May led Surrey to their sixth and seventh consecutive County Championships in 1957 and 1958 and also captained England from 1955 to 1961, winning the Ashes in 1956. Construction of the new stand, which cost around £10m, began in September 2015. It officially opened on 15 May 2016, increasing the capacity of the ground by 1,300 seats to 25,300.

Following the demolition of the Tony Lock stand, the club renamed the Laker Stand as the Lock/Laker Stand, continuing to honour the contribution made by the spin partnership of Tony Lock and Jim Laker, who collectively took 3,108 wickets for the club.

The Lock/Laker stand was itself demolished in September 2019, and work began on the construction of a new development in its place, initially named "One Oval Square". The new structure included a three-tier stand that increased the ground's total capacity to 27,500, as well as providing facilities for the club's hospitality, conference and events businesses, and improved facilities for Members. The new stand opened in June 2021 and was renamed the M.A.R. Galadari Stand.

Floodlights were added in the shape of an O for oval on one side of the ground to emulate the e-shaped floodlights at Edgbaston. These were replaced ahead of the 2025 season with new LED ones in the shape of the three feathers on Surrey's crest.

== Other sports ==
=== Football ===
The Oval was also an important site in the historical development of football in England. Football had been played in this part of London for many years prior to the inauguration of The Oval: "The Gymnastic Society", arguably the world's first organised football club, met regularly at nearby Kennington Common during the second half of the eighteenth century to play the game.

Between 1950 and 1963, amateur club Corinthian Casuals played their home matches at The Oval, with the pitch at the Vauxhall End.

==== First international football match ====
The Oval was the venue for the first representative football match in the world on 5 March 1870, England against Scotland, organised by The Football Association. The game resulted in a 1–1 draw, but is not recognised by FIFA as the first official international match because the Scotland team was selected only from London-based Scottish players. Similar representative international matches between England and Scotland took place at The Oval until February 1872.

On 8 March 1873, the England national team beat Scotland 4–2 in the first officially recognised international match to be played in England. England continued to play occasionally at The Oval until 1889.

List of England Internationals at The Oval
Date	Result	Opponent	Competition	Winner
5 March 1870	1–1	Scotland	Friendly (unofficial)	Draw
19 November 1870	1–0	Scotland	Friendly (unofficial)	(England)
25 February 1871	1–1	Scotland	Friendly (unofficial)	Draw
17 November 1871	2–1	Scotland	Friendly (unofficial)	(England)
24 February 1872	1–0	Scotland	Friendly (unofficial)	(England)
8 March 1873	4–2	Scotland	Friendly	(England)
6 March 1875	2–2	Scotland	Friendly	Draw
3 March 1877	1–3	Scotland	Friendly	(Scotland)
19 January 1879	2–1	Wales	Friendly	(England)
5 April 1879	5–4	Scotland	Friendly	(England)
12 March 1881	1–6	Scotland	Friendly	(Scotland)
3 February 1883	5–0	Wales	Friendly	(England)
21 March 1885	1–1	Scotland	Home International	Draw
26 February 1887	4–0	Wales	Home International	(England)
13 April 1889	2–3	Scotland	Home International	(Scotland)
19 December 1891	6–1	North America	Friendly (unofficial)	(England)

==== First FA Cup final ====
The Oval was the site of the first FA Cup final, and also both semi-final matches. On 16 March 1872, The Wanderers beat the Royal Engineers 1–0 to win the first FA Cup. This final was notable for the Engineers' then innovative footballing style of teamwork rather than individual play. C. W. Alcock, Secretary of The Football Association, was the prime mover in the creation of the competition. He had also just become Secretary of Surrey CCC, so The Oval was the natural choice of venue for the final. Alcock was also captain of the successful Wanderers side. Apart from 1873, The Oval hosted all subsequent FA Cup finals until 1892.

=== Rugby ===
Between 1872 and 1879, The Oval held seven full cap international rugby union matches. The final of the United Hospitals Challenge Cup, the oldest rugby union cup competition in the world, was also first held at The Oval on Wednesday 3 March 1875.

=== Hockey ===
From 1935 to 1949 England women's international hockey matches were played at The Oval. One of these matches, in 1938, was the first match in any team sport to be televised by the BBC, as a trial for broadcasting the Oval Test later that year.

=== Baseball ===
On 12 March 1889, the Oval hosted an exhibition baseball game between the Chicago Whitestockings and an "All-American" team as part of Albert Spalding's 1888-1889 baseball world tour. The Oval was reported to have been full, and the match was attended by the Prince of Wales who greeted the players following the game.

=== Australian rules football ===
The Oval has hosted exhibition matches for Australian rules football. The first such match was held between Carlton and a team of All-Stars in 1972. In 1987, the Oval hosted what became known as the Battle of Britain between Carlton and North Melbourne, which included numerous fights and future multiple AFL Premiership coach Alastair Clarkson, at the time only a teenager, breaking Ian Aitken's jaw.

In 1989, the Oval hosted the final of the VFL postseason exhibition Foster's Cup following semifinals in Toronto and Miami Gardens as Melbourne beat Essendon.

In 2005, a record crowd for Australian rules football in England (18,884) saw Fremantle defeat the West Coast Eagles in the Western Derby (thus far, the only edition of the fixture to not be played in Perth). In 2012, approximately 10,000 attended a post-season exhibition match between Port Adelaide and the Western Bulldogs, which Port Adelaide won by 1 point.

== Conferences and events ==
As well as being an international sporting venue, The Oval has a conference and events business. The Corinthian Roof Terrace built on the OCS Stand in 2013 features panoramic views of the London skyline.

The ground has also hosted other sporting events and also music concerts.

On 18 September 1971, a day-long rock concert was held at The Oval to raise funds for famine relief in war-torn Bangladesh. Featuring The Faces and headlined by The Who, a crowd of over 40,000 people attended, with the stage sited at the Vauxhall End. On 22 August 2025, the Who's concert would be released on its own. The following year, two more successful concerts were held; the first featuring Frank Zappa and Hawkwind, the second featuring Emerson, Lake and Palmer and Genesis.

In 2011, ahead of an NFL International Series game at Wembley Stadium, the Chicago Bears used The Oval as a practice facility.

== Oval gasometer and gasworks ==
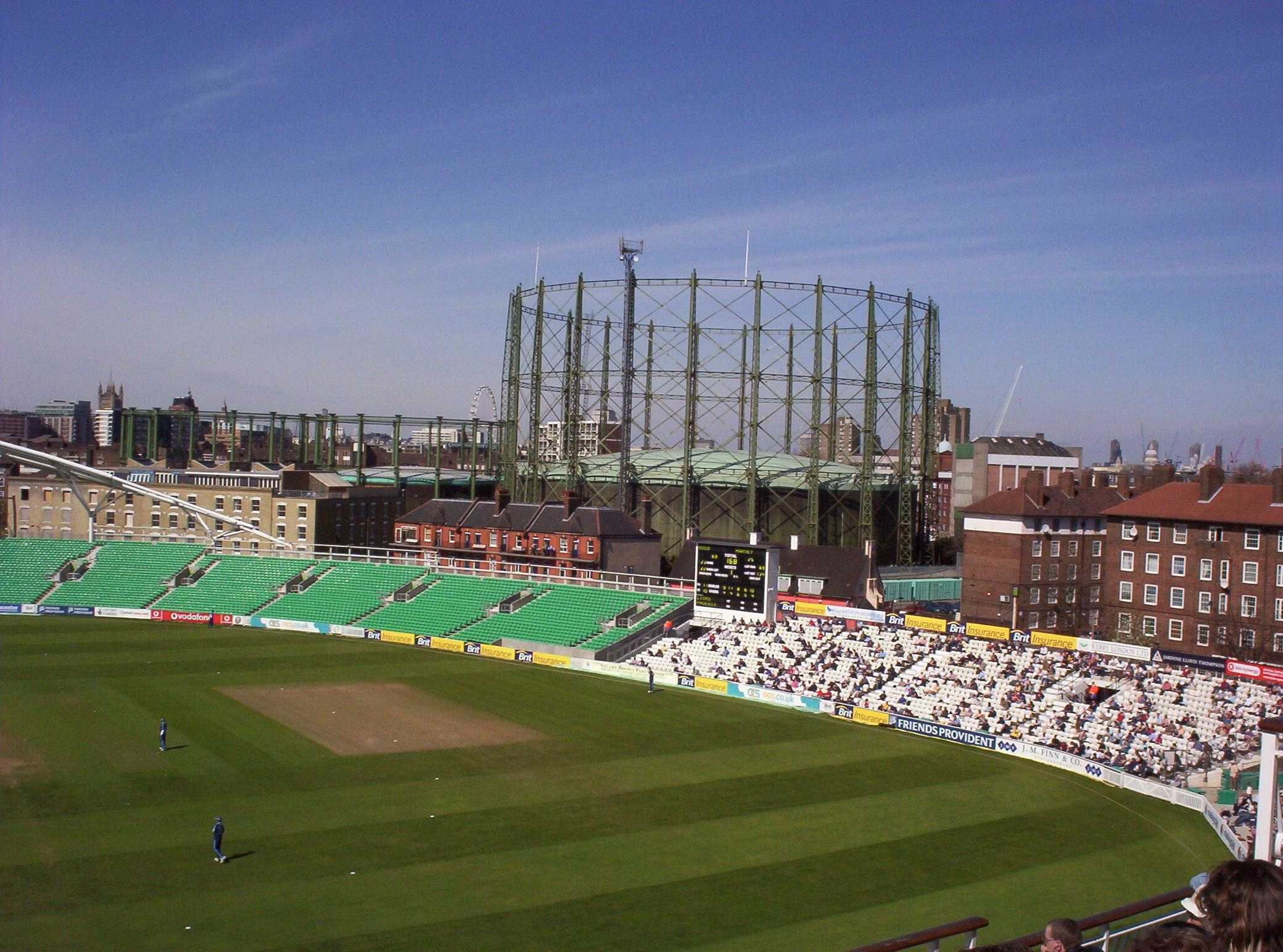
The Oval Gasholder

A tall Victorian gasometer, sited less than 50 metres beyond the north-eastern stadium wall, has been a dominating feature of the view from the ground since the mid-1800s. A movement to preserve iconic gasometers across the UK as important and historic monuments of Britain's industrial heritage has emerged in recent years, with the one visible from The Oval often cited as a particularly notable example. The skeletal but decorative wrought iron structure is a landmark in the area and has become an intrinsic part of The Oval's history and urban allure. The cricket commentator Henry Blofeld once said in a broadcast, "As the bowler runs in, it's so quiet you can hear the creak of the gasometer."

Although long unused as a gas holder, the aging structure was only officially decommissioned in 2014, with plans to demolish it being announced in 2013. Blofeld stated: "In comparison, pulling down the Victoria Memorial in front of Buckingham Palace would be child's play.". After local public protest at the proposed demolition, in March 2016 the structure was given Grade II listed status to protect its future.

The gas holder is being converted to 200 homes contained within the listed metal frame itself: first completions are expected in 2028.

== Transport connections ==
Service	Station/Stop	Lines/Routes served	Distance
London Buses	Oval Station	36, 185, 436	100 metres (330 ft)
London Buses	Clapham Road	155, 333	200 metres (660 ft)
London Buses	Oval Station	155, 333	190 metres (620 ft)
London Underground	Oval	Northern line	190 metres (620 ft)
London Underground	Vauxhall	Victoria line	850 metres (2,790 ft)
National Rail	Vauxhall	South Western Railway	850 metres (2,790 ft)

== Test cricket records ==
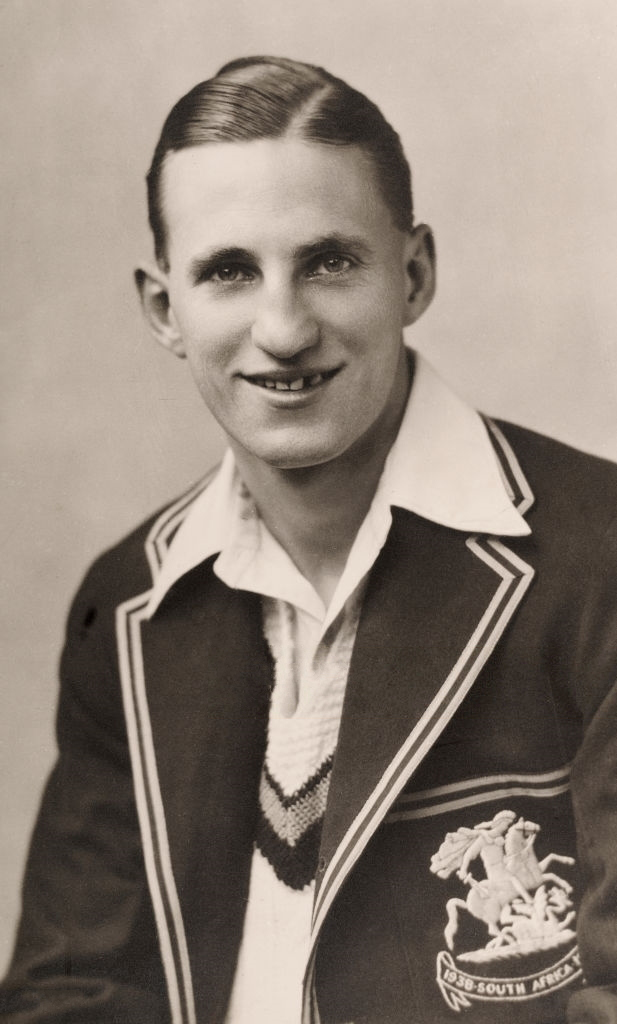
Len Hutton holds the record for most career runs at The Oval.

=== Batting ===
Most career runs
Runs	Player	Period
1,521 (19 innings)	(England) Len Hutton	1937–1954
1,217 (24 innings)	(England) Alastair Cook	2006–2018
1,097 (22 innings)	(England) Graham Gooch	1978–1994
930 (17 innings)	(England) Wally Hammond	1928–1946
927 (22 innings)	(England) Joe Root	2013–2025

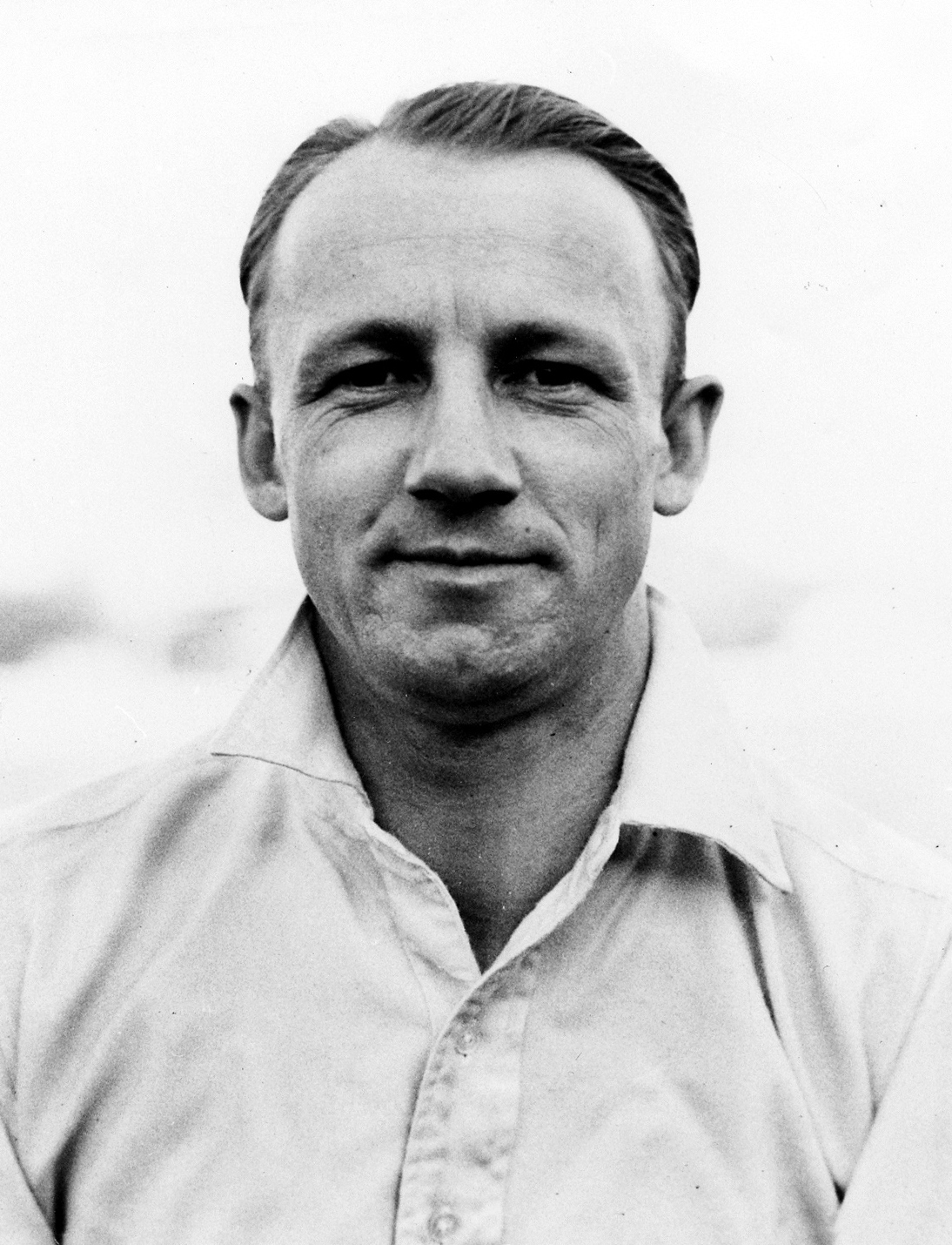
Don Bradman holds the record for most career runs at the ground by a non-Englishman.

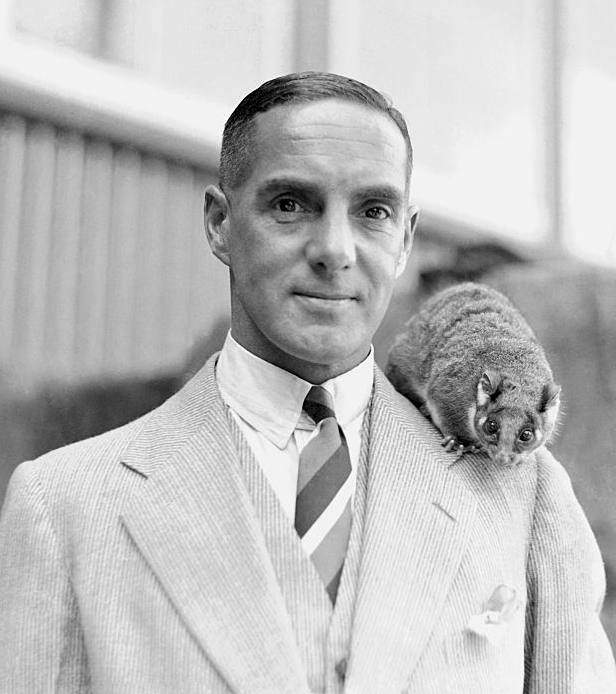
Herbert Sutcliffe scored five centuries at the ground, the most of any player.

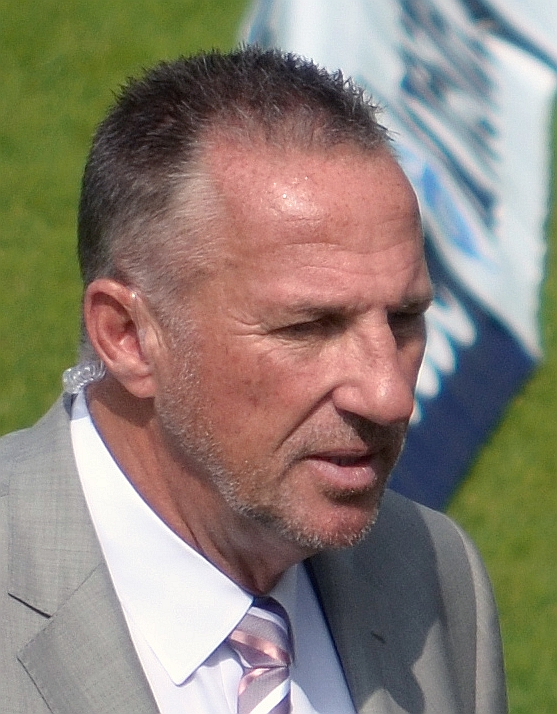
Ian Botham has taken the most wickets at the ground, with 52.

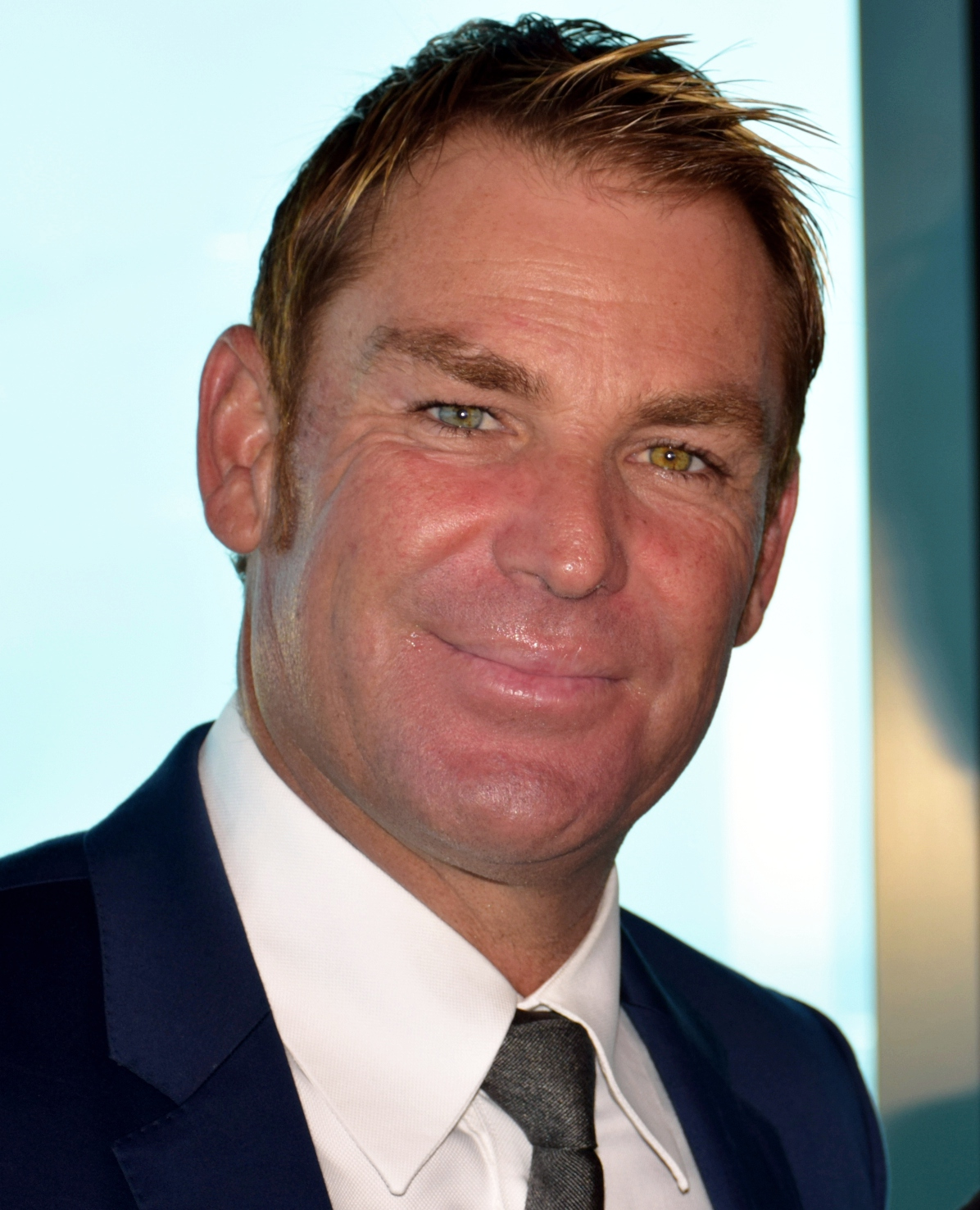
Shane Warne took 32 wickets at the ground, the most by a non-Englishman.

Most career runs (non-England)
Runs	Player	Period
553 (4 innings)	(Australia) Don Bradman	1930–1948
516 (7 innings)	(Australia) Steve Smith	2013–2023
478 (8 innings)	(Australia) Allan Border	1981–1993
448 (5 innings)	(South Africa) Bruce Mitchell	1929–1947
443 (5 innings)	(India) Rahul Dravid	2002–2011

Highest individual scores
Runs	Player	Date
364 v. Australia	(England) Len Hutton	20 Aug 1938
311* v. England	(South Africa) Hashim Amla	19 Jul 2012
291 v. England	(Cricket West Indies) Viv Richards	12 Aug 1976
266 v. England	(Australia) Bill Ponsford	18 Aug 1934
260 v. England	(Pakistan) Javed Miandad	6 Aug 1987

Most centuries
Centuries	Player	Period
5 (11 innings)	(England) Herbert Sutcliffe	1924–1934
4 (15 innings)	(England) Kevin Pietersen	2005–2013
4 (17 innings)	(England) Wally Hammond	1928–1946
4 (19 innings)	(England) Len Hutton	1937–1954
4 (20 innings)	(England) David Gower	1978–1992

Highest batting average (3+ matches)
Average	Player	Period
183.00 (3 innings, 1 NO)	(England) Joe Hardstaff Jr	1937–1939
138.25 (4 innings, 0 NO)	(Australia) Don Bradman	1930–1948
131.00 (7 innings, 6 NO)	(England) Steve Harmison	2003–2009
121.00 (3 innings, 1 NO)	(Pakistan) Saleem Malik	1987–1996
112.00 (5 innings, 1 NO)	(South Africa) Bruce Mitchell	1929–1947

=== Bowling ===
Most career wickets
Wickets	Player	Period
52 (20 innings)	(England) Ian Botham	1978–1991
50 (30 innings)	(England) James Anderson	2003–2023
45 (19 innings)	(England) Derek Underwood	1967–1977
45 (25 innings)	(England) Stuart Broad	2008–2023
40 (10 innings)	(England) Sydney Barnes	1909–1912
40 (15 innings)	(England) Jim Laker	1949–1958

Most career wickets (non-England)
Wickets	Player	Period
32 (8 innings)	(Australia) Shane Warne	1993–2005
27 (6 innings)	(Cricket West Indies) Michael Holding	1976–1984
27 (6 innings)	(Australia) Dennis Lillee	1972–1981
27 (7 innings)	(Australia) Hugh Trumble	1890–1902
20 (5 innings)	(Australia) Fred Spofforth	1882–1886

Best innings figures
Figures	Player	Date
9/57 v. South Africa	(England) Devon Malcolm	18 Aug 1994
9/65 v. England	(Sri Lanka) Muttiah Muralitharan	27 Aug 1998
8/29 v. South Africa	(England) Sydney Barnes	12 Aug 1912
8/65 v. England	(Australia) Hugh Trumble	11 Aug 1902
8/92 v. England	(Cricket West Indies) Michael Holding	12 Aug 1976

Best match figures
Figures	Player	Date
16/220 v. England	(Sri Lanka) Muttiah Muralitharan	27 Aug 1998
14/90 v. England	(Australia) Fred Spofforth	28 Aug 1882
14/149 v. England	(Cricket West Indies) Michael Holding	12 Aug 1976
13/57 v. South Africa	(England) Sydney Barnes	12 Aug 1912
12/89 v. England	(Australia) Hugh Trumble	10 Aug 1896
12/99 v. England	(Pakistan) Fazal Mahmood	12 Aug 1954
12/101 v. New Zealand	(England) Derek Underwood	21 Aug 1969
12/102 v. Australia	(England) Fred Martin	11 Aug 1890
12/104 v. Australia	(England) George Lohmann	12 Aug 1886
12/173 v. England	(Australia) Hugh Trumble	11 Aug 1902

Note: best match figures limited to 10; there have actually been seven 12-wicket match hauls at The Oval.

Lowest strike rate (4+ innings)
Strike rate	Player	Period
23.5 (13 wickets)	(England) Bobby Peel	1888–1896
26.9 (20 wickets)	(England) Frank Woolley	1909–1934
30.3 (27 wickets)	(Cricket West Indies) Michael Holding	1976–1984
31.2 (22 wickets)	(England) Sydney Barnes	1909–1912
31.2 (11 wickets)	(Pakistan) Wahab Riaz	2010–2016

=== Team records ===
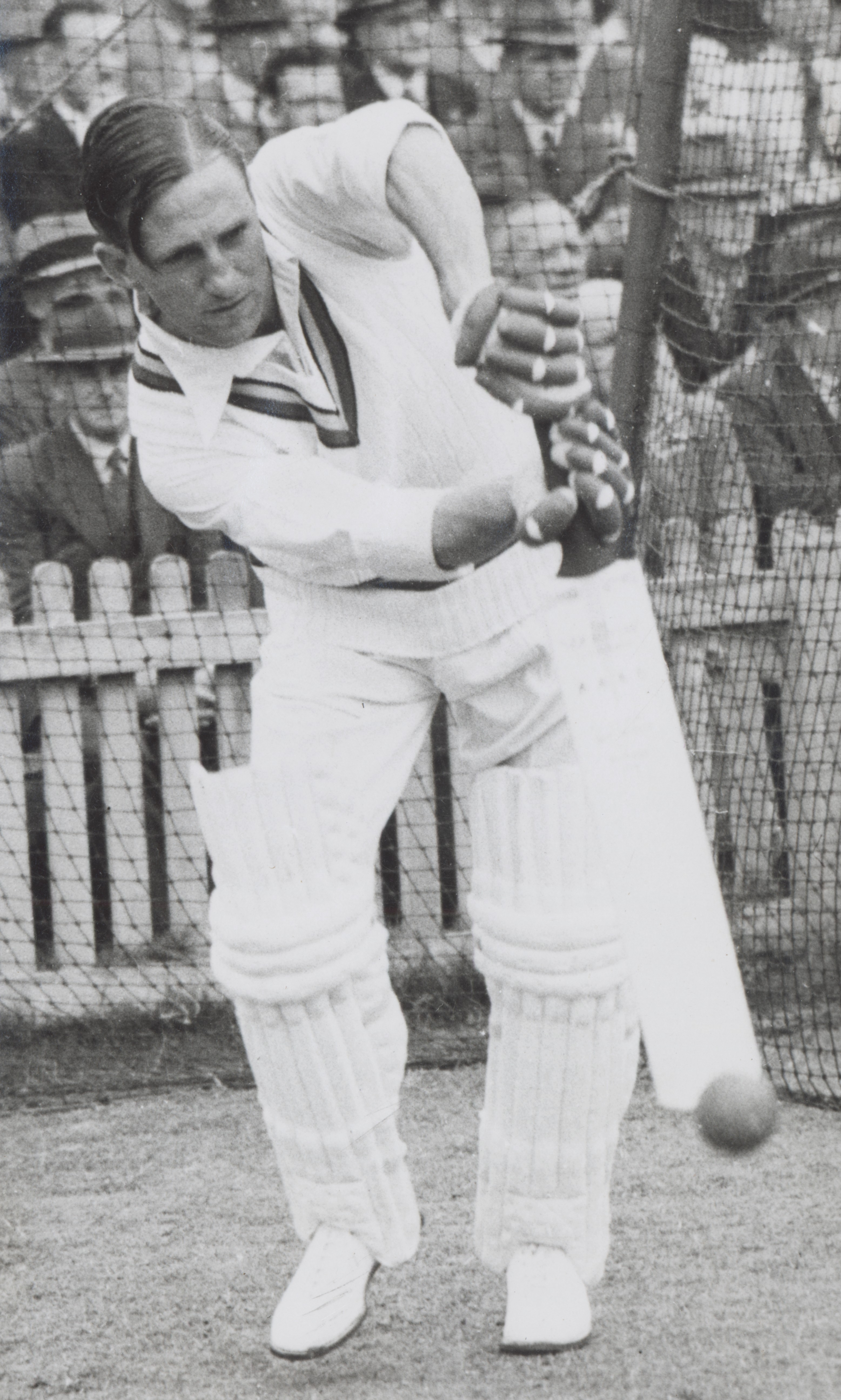
Hutton topscored with 364, as England totalled 903/7d in 1938.

Highest innings scores
Score	Team	Date
903/7d	England v. Australia	20 Aug 1938
708	Pakistan v. England	6 Aug 1987
701	Australia v. England	18 Aug 1934
695	Australia v. England	16 Aug 1930
692/8d	(Cricket West Indies) West Indies v. England	24 Aug 1995

Lowest completed innings
Score	Team	Date
44	Australia v. England	10 Aug 1896
52	England v. Australia	14 Aug 1948
63	Australia v. England	28 Aug 1882
65	Australia v. England	19 Aug 1912
68	Australia v. England	12 Aug 1886

=== Partnership records ===
Highest partnerships
Runs	Wicket	Players	Match	Date
451	2nd	Bill Ponsford (266) & Don Bradman (244)	Australia v. England	18 Aug 1934
382	2nd	Len Hutton (364) & Maurice Leyland (187)	England v. Australia	20 Aug 1938
377*	3rd	Hashim Amla (311*) & Jacques Kallis (182*)	South Africa v. England	19 Jul 2012
351	2nd	Graham Gooch (196) & David Gower (157)	England v. Australia	29 Aug 1985
350	3rd	Ian Bell (235) & Kevin Pietersen (175)	England v. India	18 Aug 2011

Highest partnerships by wicket
Runs	Wicket	Players	Match	Date
290	1st	Geoff Pullar (175) & Colin Cowdrey (155)	England v. South Africa	18 Aug 1960
451	2nd	Bill Ponsford (266) & Don Bradman (244)	Australia v. England	18 Aug 1934
377*	3rd	Hashim Amla (311*) & Jacques Kallis (182*)	South Africa v. England	19 Jul 2012
285	4th	Travis Head (163) & Steve Smith (121)	Australia v. India	7 Jun 2023
191	5th	Javed Miandad (260) & Imran Khan (118)	Pakistan v. England	6 Aug 1987
215	6th	Len Hutton (364) & Joe Hardstaff Jr (169*)	England v. Australia	20 Aug 1938
142	7th	Jack Sharp (105) & Kenneth Hutchings (59)	England v. Australia	9 Aug 1909
217	8th	Tom Graveney (165) & John Murray (112)	England v. West Indies	18 Aug 1966
190	9th	Asif Iqbal (146) & Intikhab Alam (51)	Pakistan v. England	24 Aug 1967
128	10th	Ken Higgs (63) & John Snow (59)	England v. West Indies	18 Aug 1966

Last updated 23 October 2025.

== See also ==
- Archbishop Tenison's School – a historic school located next to the ground, often used as a vantage point for TV cameras and crews
- Gasworks Gallery, next to the ground
- History of Test cricket from 1877 to 1883
- History of Test cricket from 1884 to 1889
- History of Test cricket from 1890 to 1900
- List of cricket grounds in England and Wales
- List of Test cricket grounds
- List of stadiums in the United Kingdom by capacity
- Lists of stadiums

Preceded by none	FA Cup; Final Venue; 1872	Succeeded by Lillie Bridge; London
Preceded by Lillie Bridge; London	FA Cup; Final Venue; 1874–1892	Succeeded by Fallowfield; Manchester
