= Eric Pascoe =

Australian rules footballer and coach

Personal information
- Full name: Eric Pascoe
- Born: 8 October 1953 (age 73)
- Original team: Northern United Bendigo FL
- Height: 192 cm (6 ft 4 in)
- Weight: 96 kg (212 lb)
- Position: Ruckman

Playing career^{1}
Years	Club	Games (Goals)
1972–76	Carlton	32 (7)
- ^{1} Playing statistics correct to the end of 1976.

Eric Pascoe (born 8 October 1953) is a former Australian rules footballer who played with Carlton in the Victorian Football League (VFL) during the 1970s.

The ruckman from Bendigo was an understudy to John Nicholls and Peter Jones at Carlton and made his early VFL appearances when one of them was injured. He was Carlton's reserves 'Best and Fairest' winner in 1973. Nicholls retired in 1974 but by then ruckman Mike Fitzpatrick had been recruited from the West Australian Football League and Pascoe continued to play most of his football in the reserves.

After getting a clearance, Pascoe joined Clarence in Tasmania for a two-year stint as captain-coach from 1977 to 1978. He then won the 1979 Bendigo Football League best and fairest award, the Michelsen Medal while playing for Golden Square.
