= Peter Fyffe =

Australian rules footballer

Personal information
- Full name: Peter Fyffe
- Born: 22 August 1951 (age 75)
- Original team: Newstead
- Height: 183 cm (6 ft 0 in)
- Weight: 76 kg (168 lb)

Playing career^{1}
Years	Club	Games (Goals)
1970–1973	Carlton	19 (1)
- ^{1} Playing statistics correct to the end of 1973.

Career highlights
- Carlton: 1970 Reserves best first year player; 1971 Reserves best and fairest; 1972 Reserves best and fairest

Peter Fyffe (born 22 August 1951) is a former Australian rules footballer who played for Carlton in the VFL.

He was recruited from Newstead in Carlton's country zone and went on to win consecutive Reserves best and fairest awards in 1971 and 1972. He was released from Carlton early in the 1974 season and went to Tasmania to play for Cooee.
