= John Baird (footballer, born 1870) =

Scottish footballer, born 1870

Personal information
- Full name: John Baird
- Date of birth: 25 February 1870
- Place of birth: Alexandria, Scotland
- Date of death: 1905 (aged 34–35)
- Position: Full back

Senior career*
Years	Team	Apps	(Gls)
- Vale Athletic
- Vale of Leven
1888	Aston Villa	0	(0)
- Kidderminster Olympic
- Kidderminster Harriers
1891–1895	Aston Villa	60	(0)
1895–1896	Leicester Fosse	13	(0)
- Clyde
- Vale of Leven
- * Club domestic league appearances and goals

John Baird (25 February 1870 – 1905) was a Scottish footballer who played in the Football League for Aston Villa and Leicester Fosse.
