= Paul O'Brien (Australian footballer, born 1950) =

Australian rules footballer

Personal information
- Full name: Paul F. O'Brien
- Born: 14 December 1950 (age 75)
- Original team: Echuca
- Height: 187 cm (6 ft 2 in)
- Weight: 82.5 kg (182 lb)

Playing career^{1}
Years	Club	Games (Goals)
1971–1972	Carlton	2 (0)
- ^{1} Playing statistics correct to the end of 1972.

Paul F. O'Brien (born 14 December 1950) is a former Australian rules footballer who played with Carlton in the Victorian Football League (VFL). He later played for Port Melbourne in the Victorian Football Association (VFA).
