= Andrew Lukas =

Australian rules footballer

Personal information
- Born: 19 July 1950 (age 76)
- Original team: St Marks
- Debut: Round 7, 1970, Carlton vs. South Melbourne, at Lake Oval
- Height: 178 cm (5 ft 10 in)
- Weight: 76 kg (168 lb)

Playing career^{1}
Years	Club	Games (Goals)
1970–1973	Carlton	34 (3)
1973–1975	Fitzroy	30 (1)
1977-1981	Dandenong	28 (31)
Total		92 (35)
- ^{1} Playing statistics correct to the end of 1975.

Andrew Lukas (born Andrew Lukimitis; 19 July 1950) is a former Australian rules footballer who played for Carlton and Fitzroy in the VFL during the early 1970s. Lukas played his first season under his birth surname Lukimitis before shortening it to Lukas by deed poll in 1971.

The son of Latvian parents, Lukas was recruited from Fawkner and made his way into the seniors at Carlton in 1970 after playing for their Under-19s. He was used mostly as a defender and came off the bench in the 1972 Grand Final win over Richmond. In 1973 Lukas crossed to Fitzroy where he spent three seasons before retiring from the league and finishing his career at Dandenong.
