= Peter Warburton (footballer) =

Australian rules footballer

Personal information
- Full name: Peter Warburton
- Born: 3 September 1951 (age 75)
- Original team: Tatura
- Height: 174 cm (5 ft 9 in)
- Weight: 72 kg (159 lb)

Playing career^{1}
Years	Club	Games (Goals)
1971–1972	Carlton	4 (1)
- ^{1} Playing statistics correct to the end of 1972.

Peter Warburton (born 3 September 1951) is a former Australian rules footballer who played with Carlton in the Victorian Football League (VFL). He later played for Port Melbourne and Williamstown in the Victorian Football Association (VFA). Warburton is the son of Carlton player, Keith.
