= Mark Amos =

Australian rules footballer

Personal information
- Full name: Mark Andrew Amos
- Born: 5 August 1951 (age 75)
- Original teams: Robinvale, Montmorency (DVFL)
- Height: 189 cm (6 ft 2 in)
- Weight: 92 kg (203 lb)

Playing career^{1}
Years	Club	Games (Goals)
1970–1971	Carlton	6 (0)
1972	Fitzroy	1 (1)
- ^{1} Playing statistics correct to the end of 1972.

Career highlights
- 1970 Carlton reserves best and fairest

Mark Andrew Amos (born 5 August 1951) is a former Australian rules footballer who played for Carlton and Fitzroy in the Victorian Football League (VFL).

== Career ==
Amos was recruited to Carlton from Diamond Valley Football League (DVFL) club Montmorency in 1970. He played six games for the Blues in 1970 and 1971.

He was cleared to Fitzroy in 1972, where he played one game, against Carlton, kicking a goal.
