= Paul Hurst (Australian footballer) =

Australian rules footballer

Personal information
- Born: 19 December 1948 (age 77); Albury, NSW, AUS
- Original team: Sandhurst (Bendigo FL)
- Debut: Round 1, 1970, Carlton vs. Essendon, at Princes Park
- Height: 184 cm (6 ft 0 in)
- Weight: 86 kg (190 lb)

Playing career^{1}
Years	Club	Games (Goals)
1970–1974	Carlton	53 (0)
1975–1977	Melbourne	19 (6)
Total		72 (6)
- ^{1} Playing statistics correct to the end of 1977.

Paul Hurst (born 19 December 1948) is a former Australian rules footballer who played for Carlton and Melbourne in the Victorian Football League (VFL) during the 1970s.

Hurst arrived at Carlton from Sandhurst Football Club in the Bendigo Football League and for five seasons played on a half flank and centre, including as a member of Carlton's 1972 premiership team. After receiving a clearance, Hurst moved to Melbourne where he finished his career.
