= Thomas McCulloch (footballer, born 1868) =

Scottish footballer

Personal information
- Full name: Thomas McCulloch
- Date of birth: 1868
- Place of birth: Strathblane, Scotland
- Position: Full back

Senior career*
Years	Team	Apps	(Gls)
1887–1888	Glasgow United		
1888–1889	Partick Thistle		
1889–1890	Rangers		
1890–1893	West Bromwich Albion	46	(0)
1893	Stirling		
Total		46	(0)
- * Club domestic league appearances and goals

Thomas McCulloch (1868–unknown) was a Scottish footballer who played in the Football League for West Bromwich Albion.
