= 1967 VFL season =

71st season of the Victorian Football League (VFL)

1967 VFL premiership season
- Teams: 12
- Premiers: Richmond; 6th premiership
- Minor premiers: Richmond; 6th minor premiership
- Consolation series: Footscray; 3rd Consolation series win
- Brownlow Medallist: Ross Smith (St Kilda)
- Coleman Medallist: Doug Wade (Geelong)
- Matches played: 112
- Highest: 109,396

The 1967 VFL season was the 71st season of the Victorian Football League (VFL), the highest level senior Australian rules football competition in Victoria. The season featured twelve clubs, ran from 15 April until 23 September, and comprised an 18-game home-and-away season followed by a finals series featuring the top four clubs.

The premiership was won by the Richmond Football Club for the sixth time, after it defeated Geelong by nine points in the 1967 VFL Grand Final.

== Background ==
In 1967, the VFL competition consisted of twelve teams of 18 on-the-field players each, plus two substitute players, known as the 19th man and the 20th man. A player could be substituted for any reason; however, once substituted, a player could not return to the field of play under any circumstances.

Teams played each other in a home-and-away season of 18 rounds; matches 12 to 18 were the "home-and-way reverse" of matches 1 to 7.

Once the 18 round home-and-away season had finished, the 1967 VFL Premiers were determined by the specific format and conventions of the Page–McIntyre system.

== Home-and-away season ==
=== Round 1 ===
Home team	Home team score	Away team	Away team score	Venue	Crowd	Date
Hawthorn	20.12 (132)	South Melbourne	15.12 (102)	Glenferrie Oval	18,294	15 April 1967
North Melbourne	8.14 (62)	Melbourne	9.13 (67)	Arden Street Oval	13,690	15 April 1967
St Kilda	22.13 (145)	Footscray	9.10 (64)	Moorabbin Oval	28,564	15 April 1967
Richmond	15.20 (110)	Essendon	11.9 (75)	MCG	56,387	15 April 1967
Geelong	13.13 (91)	Collingwood	13.12 (90)	Kardinia Park	35,151	15 April 1967
Fitzroy	5.6 (36)	Carlton	18.22 (130)	Princes Park	24,211	15 April 1967

=== Round 2 ===
Home team	Home team score	Away team	Away team score	Venue	Crowd	Date
Footscray	12.6 (78)	Richmond	8.22 (70)	Western Oval	19,286	22 April 1967
Essendon	7.11 (53)	St Kilda	8.8 (56)	Windy Hill	26,100	22 April 1967
Collingwood	16.17 (113)	North Melbourne	7.8 (50)	Victoria Park	23,576	22 April 1967
Carlton	12.16 (88)	Hawthorn	6.8 (44)	Princes Park	31,558	22 April 1967
Melbourne	9.8 (62)	Geelong	14.11 (95)	MCG	37,759	22 April 1967
South Melbourne	15.13 (103)	Fitzroy	10.5 (65)	Lake Oval	11,739	22 April 1967

=== Round 3 ===
Home team	Home team score	Away team	Away team score	Venue	Crowd	Date
Geelong	11.15 (81)	Hawthorn	7.5 (47)	Kardinia Park	17,227	29 April 1967
Footscray	6.5 (41)	South Melbourne	11.13 (79)	Western Oval	18,283	29 April 1967
Carlton	10.13 (73)	North Melbourne	8.9 (57)	Princes Park	19,041	29 April 1967
St Kilda	9.13 (67)	Melbourne	10.9 (69)	Moorabbin Oval	27,760	29 April 1967
Richmond	11.12 (78)	Fitzroy	7.11 (53)	MCG	20,938	29 April 1967
Essendon	8.6 (54)	Collingwood	10.16 (76)	Windy Hill	34,600	29 April 1967

=== Round 4 ===
Home team	Home team score	Away team	Away team score	Venue	Crowd	Date
North Melbourne	10.8 (68)	Richmond	11.22 (88)	Arden Street Oval	12,750	6 May 1967
Hawthorn	10.6 (66)	St Kilda	15.11 (101)	Glenferrie Oval	20,352	6 May 1967
Fitzroy	9.10 (64)	Geelong	22.13 (145)	Princes Park	9,747	6 May 1967
Collingwood	13.17 (95)	Footscray	5.7 (37)	Victoria Park	21,855	6 May 1967
South Melbourne	18.19 (127)	Essendon	13.10 (88)	Lake Oval	18,756	6 May 1967
Melbourne	5.15 (45)	Carlton	16.8 (104)	MCG	48,513	6 May 1967

=== Round 5 ===
Home team	Home team score	Away team	Away team score	Venue	Crowd	Date
Footscray	12.11 (83)	Melbourne	12.10 (82)	Western Oval	15,818	13 May 1967
Fitzroy	9.6 (60)	North Melbourne	13.13 (91)	Princes Park	9,897	13 May 1967
Essendon	8.13 (61)	Geelong	10.12 (72)	Windy Hill	24,100	13 May 1967
Collingwood	13.25 (103)	South Melbourne	7.15 (57)	Victoria Park	33,714	13 May 1967
Richmond	16.22 (118)	Hawthorn	5.13 (43)	MCG	27,175	13 May 1967
St Kilda	11.9 (75)	Carlton	11.14 (80)	Moorabbin Oval	44,382	13 May 1967

=== Round 6 ===
Home team	Home team score	Away team	Away team score	Venue	Crowd	Date
Hawthorn	7.9 (51)	North Melbourne	10.13 (73)	Glenferrie Oval	10,136	20 May 1967
Geelong	16.12 (108)	South Melbourne	13.11 (89)	Kardinia Park	21,565	20 May 1967
Carlton	10.13 (73)	Collingwood	9.13 (67)	Princes Park	43,589	20 May 1967
St Kilda	9.4 (58)	Richmond	14.15 (99)	Moorabbin Oval	32,342	20 May 1967
Melbourne	13.15 (93)	Fitzroy	7.9 (51)	MCG	17,582	20 May 1967
Footscray	4.7 (31)	Essendon	11.13 (79)	Western Oval	21,278	20 May 1967

=== Round 7 ===
Home team	Home team score	Away team	Away team score	Venue	Crowd	Date
Fitzroy	9.12 (66)	Hawthorn	16.14 (110)	Princes Park	7,600	27 May 1967
Essendon	10.12 (72)	Melbourne	6.10 (46)	Windy Hill	17,684	27 May 1967
Collingwood	16.20 (116)	St Kilda	14.14 (98)	Victoria Park	31,877	27 May 1967
Richmond	18.11 (119)	Geelong	12.9 (81)	MCG	50,348	27 May 1967
North Melbourne	7.13 (55)	Footscray	6.6 (42)	Arden Street Oval	10,280	27 May 1967
South Melbourne	11.12 (78)	Carlton	11.12 (78)	Lake Oval	21,870	27 May 1967

=== Round 8 ===
Home team	Home team score	Away team	Away team score	Venue	Crowd	Date
Hawthorn	12.8 (80)	Melbourne	18.17 (125)	Glenferrie Oval	13,772	3 June 1967
Carlton	11.19 (85)	Geelong	12.9 (81)	Princes Park	30,481	3 June 1967
South Melbourne	20.18 (138)	St Kilda	14.25 (109)	Lake Oval	26,584	3 June 1967
Footscray	7.15 (57)	Fitzroy	12.9 (81)	Western Oval	11,727	3 June 1967
North Melbourne	12.16 (88)	Essendon	13.10 (88)	Arden Street Oval	16,120	3 June 1967
Richmond	13.5 (83)	Collingwood	13.12 (90)	MCG	71,946	3 June 1967

=== Round 9 ===
Home team	Home team score	Away team	Away team score	Venue	Crowd	Date
Essendon	21.16 (142)	Hawthorn	6.15 (51)	Windy Hill	13,277	10 June 1967
Collingwood	19.20 (134)	Fitzroy	4.9 (33)	Victoria Park	18,643	10 June 1967
St Kilda	9.17 (71)	North Melbourne	8.13 (61)	Moorabbin Oval	17,258	10 June 1967
Melbourne	19.14 (128)	South Melbourne	12.17 (89)	MCG	45,723	12 June 1967
Carlton	14.7 (91)	Richmond	13.15 (93)	Princes Park	37,384	12 June 1967
Geelong	15.12 (102)	Footscray	9.8 (62)	Kardinia Park	21,963	12 June 1967

=== Round 10 ===
Home team	Home team score	Away team	Away team score	Venue	Crowd	Date
North Melbourne	16.11 (107)	South Melbourne	14.7 (91)	Arden Street Oval	11,967	24 June 1967
Collingwood	17.16 (118)	Hawthorn	12.9 (81)	Victoria Park	17,363	24 June 1967
Richmond	24.14 (158)	Melbourne	12.9 (81)	MCG	38,519	24 June 1967
St Kilda	18.14 (122)	Geelong	10.10 (70)	Moorabbin Oval	27,055	24 June 1967
Fitzroy	9.11 (65)	Essendon	13.13 (91)	Princes Park	12,076	24 June 1967
Footscray	7.12 (54)	Carlton	11.4 (70)	Western Oval	19,883	24 June 1967

=== Round 11 ===
Home team	Home team score	Away team	Away team score	Venue	Crowd	Date
Geelong	12.6 (78)	North Melbourne	9.18 (72)	Kardinia Park	14,415	1 July 1967
Fitzroy	9.9 (63)	St Kilda	15.21 (111)	Princes Park	9,851	1 July 1967
South Melbourne	8.9 (57)	Richmond	14.25 (109)	Lake Oval	15,520	1 July 1967
Hawthorn	8.11 (59)	Footscray	14.12 (96)	Glenferrie Oval	7,530	1 July 1967
Melbourne	9.11 (65)	Collingwood	14.14 (98)	MCG	30,848	1 July 1967
Essendon	9.16 (70)	Carlton	12.7 (79)	Windy Hill	23,906	1 July 1967

=== Round 12 ===
Home team	Home team score	Away team	Away team score	Venue	Crowd	Date
Essendon	13.15 (93)	Richmond	10.12 (72)	Windy Hill	24,600	8 July 1967
Collingwood	6.15 (51)	Geelong	12.16 (88)	Victoria Park	36,121	8 July 1967
South Melbourne	10.17 (77)	Hawthorn	13.12 (90)	Lake Oval	11,448	8 July 1967
Melbourne	8.7 (55)	North Melbourne	5.22 (52)	MCG	19,191	15 July 1967
Footscray	3.15 (33)	St Kilda	11.12 (78)	Western Oval	17,939	15 July 1967
Carlton	10.16 (76)	Fitzroy	10.8 (68)	Princes Park	16,370	15 July 1967

=== Round 13 ===
Home team	Home team score	Away team	Away team score	Venue	Crowd	Date
Geelong	13.12 (90)	Melbourne	8.9 (57)	Kardinia Park	18,780	22 July 1967
Fitzroy	19.21 (135)	South Melbourne	12.10 (82)	Princes Park	10,800	22 July 1967
Richmond	19.16 (130)	Footscray	8.10 (58)	MCG	20,827	22 July 1967
St Kilda	18.6 (114)	Essendon	13.13 (91)	Moorabbin Oval	31,972	22 July 1967
North Melbourne	9.8 (62)	Collingwood	11.15 (81)	Arden Street Oval	18,851	22 July 1967
Hawthorn	9.9 (63)	Carlton	11.21 (87)	Glenferrie Oval	17,552	22 July 1967

=== Round 14 ===
Home team	Home team score	Away team	Away team score	Venue	Crowd	Date
Melbourne	8.10 (58)	St Kilda	12.19 (91)	MCG	29,175	29 July 1967
Fitzroy	8.10 (58)	Richmond	8.19 (67)	Princes Park	13,864	29 July 1967
Collingwood	8.14 (62)	Essendon	10.11 (71)	Victoria Park	27,320	29 July 1967
Hawthorn	11.12 (78)	Geelong	7.16 (58)	Glenferrie Oval	12,087	29 July 1967
South Melbourne	10.11 (71)	Footscray	5.10 (40)	Lake Oval	8,635	29 July 1967
North Melbourne	8.9 (57)	Carlton	6.8 (44)	Arden Street Oval	14,582	29 July 1967

=== Round 15 ===
Home team	Home team score	Away team	Away team score	Venue	Crowd	Date
Essendon	14.15 (99)	South Melbourne	7.16 (58)	Windy Hill	15,800	5 August 1967
Carlton	7.10 (52)	Melbourne	6.13 (49)	Princes Park	20,138	5 August 1967
Richmond	14.21 (105)	North Melbourne	13.7 (85)	MCG	34,447	5 August 1967
St Kilda	17.17 (119)	Hawthorn	8.8 (56)	Moorabbin Oval	23,406	5 August 1967
Geelong	9.14 (68)	Fitzroy	7.8 (50)	Kardinia Park	16,443	5 August 1967
Footscray	14.9 (93)	Collingwood	12.15 (87)	Western Oval	16,867	5 August 1967

=== Round 16 ===
Home team	Home team score	Away team	Away team score	Venue	Crowd	Date
Hawthorn	7.12 (54)	Richmond	23.30 (168)	Glenferrie Oval	19,441	12 August 1967
Carlton	11.7 (73)	St Kilda	9.8 (62)	Princes Park	32,912	12 August 1967
Melbourne	7.12 (54)	Footscray	7.9 (51)	MCG	17,039	12 August 1967
North Melbourne	9.12 (66)	Fitzroy	15.15 (105)	Arden Street Oval	8,509	12 August 1967
Geelong	10.13 (73)	Essendon	4.10 (34)	Kardinia Park	25,956	12 August 1967
South Melbourne	5.6 (36)	Collingwood	16.14 (110)	Lake Oval	10,034	12 August 1967

=== Round 17 ===
Home team	Home team score	Away team	Away team score	Venue	Crowd	Date
Richmond	12.13 (85)	St Kilda	7.11 (53)	MCG	48,200	19 August 1967
Fitzroy	8.18 (66)	Melbourne	9.8 (62)	Princes Park	8,027	19 August 1967
Essendon	13.11 (89)	Footscray	12.15 (87)	Windy Hill	8,700	19 August 1967
North Melbourne	9.19 (73)	Hawthorn	7.3 (45)	Arden Street Oval	4,846	19 August 1967
South Melbourne	9.9 (63)	Geelong	21.13 (139)	Lake Oval	10,034	19 August 1967
Collingwood	12.13 (85)	Carlton	8.12 (60)	Victoria Park	34,784	19 August 1967

=== Round 18 ===
Home team	Home team score	Away team	Away team score	Venue	Crowd	Date
Geelong	15.15 (105)	Richmond	18.9 (117)	Kardinia Park	34,616	26 August 1967
Footscray	7.11 (53)	North Melbourne	8.7 (55)	Western Oval	10,669	26 August 1967
Carlton	10.22 (82)	South Melbourne	7.7 (49)	Princes Park	15,609	26 August 1967
Hawthorn	13.13 (91)	Fitzroy	10.14 (74)	Glenferrie Oval	13,846	26 August 1967
Melbourne	8.12 (60)	Essendon	7.14 (56)	MCG	24,282	26 August 1967
St Kilda	14.16 (100)	Collingwood	8.5 (53)	Moorabbin Oval	28,862	26 August 1967

== Ladder ==
(P)	Premiers
	Qualified for finals

#	Team	P	W	L	D	PF	PA	%	Pts
1	Richmond (P)	18	15	3	0	1869	1281	145.9	60
2	Carlton	18	14	3	1	1425	1133	125.8	58
3	Geelong	18	13	5	0	1625	1323	122.8	52
4	Collingwood	18	12	6	0	1629	1232	132.2	48
5	St Kilda	18	11	7	0	1630	1328	122.7	44
6	Essendon	18	8	9	1	1406	1327	106.0	34
7	Melbourne	18	8	10	0	1258	1417	88.8	32
8	North Melbourne	18	7	10	1	1234	1310	94.2	30
9	South Melbourne	18	5	12	1	1446	1763	82.0	22
10	Hawthorn	18	5	13	0	1241	1766	70.3	20
11	Fitzroy	18	4	14	0	1193	1655	72.1	16
12	Footscray	18	4	14	0	1060	1481	71.6	16

Rules for classification: 1. premiership points; 2. percentage; 3. points for
Average score: 78.8
Source: AFL Tables

== Finals series ==
=== Semi-finals ===
	First Semi-final
Saturday, 2 September (2:30 pm)	Geelong 16.12 (108)	def.	Collingwood 11.12 (78)	MCG (crowd: 91,715)	Report
Collingwood captain Des Tuddenham was reported for striking, found guilty and suspended for four matches.; After slipping on the MCG's old practice-wicket area and copping a knee from Collingwood big man Ernie Hug in the first quarter, Sam Newman was taken by ambulance to St Vincent's Hospital for emergency treatment, which eventually resulted in him having a kidney removed.

Second Semi-final
Saturday, 9 September 2:30pm	Richmond	def.	Carlton	MCG (crowd: 99,051)
5.8 (38); 10.13 (73); 14.16 (100); 20.21 (141)	Q1; Q2; Q3; Final	3.4 (22); 7.9 (51); 11.12 (78); 14.17 (101)	Umpires: Sheales; Television broadcast: Seven Network
Hart 6 Brown, Patterson 3 B. Richardson, Northey, Guinane 2 Barrot, Bartlett 1	Goals	3 Munari, Nicholls; 2 Kekovich, Barassi, Jesaulenko; 1 Silvagni, Gallagher
Barrot, Hart, Clay, Dean, Guinane, Burgin	Best	Nicholls, Goold, Munari, Barassi, Silvagni, Gallagher
Crowe for striking Nicholls	Reports
Richmond ruckman Neville Crowe was found guilty and suspended for four matches.

=== Preliminary final ===
Preliminary Final
Saturday, 16 September 2:30pm	Geelong	def.	Carlton	MCG (crowd: 95,542)
1.0 (6); 6.2 (38); 14.3 (87); 17.6 (108)	Q1; Q2; Q3; Final	5.2 (32); 10.5 (65); 11.7 (73); 11.13 (79)	Umpires: Sheales; Television broadcast: Seven Network
Wade 5 Sharrock 4 Ryan, Mitchell, Andrews 2 Polinelli, Newland 1	Goals	3 Gallagher; 2 Jesaulenko; 1 Collins, Stone, Nicholls, Barassi, Robertson, Auchettl
Sharrock, Goggin, Farmer, Polinelli, Ryan, Closter, Mitchell, Walker	Best	Nicholls, Barassi, Collis, Hall, Gill, Goold, Gallagher, Collins

=== Grand final ===
	Grand final
Saturday, 23 September (2:30 pm)	Richmond 16.18 (114)	def.	Geelong 15.15 (105)	MCG (crowd: 109,396)	Report
Richmond won its sixth VFL premiership.; Tom Hafey won his first Jock McHale Medal.

== Night Series Competition ==
The night series were held under the floodlights at Lake Oval, South Melbourne, for the teams (5th to 12th on ladder) out of the finals at the end of the season.

Final: Footscray 15.11 (101) defeated South Melbourne 8.8 (56).

== Season notes ==
- As well as breaking a twenty-three year premiership drought, Richmond ended a twenty-year finals drought, making the finals for the first time since 1947.
- Geelong beat Collingwood in Round 1 after a mark was awarded to Bill Ryan, at the top of the goal square just before the siren. As the siren sounded, without the umpires hearing it, the shot at goal was touched on the mark and went through for a behind. The umpire awarded another kick to Geelong for overstepping the mark, and this time Ryan kicked a goal to win by a point.
- Former Carlton ruckman Graham Donaldson, now coaching in Morwell, Victoria, was also the manager of one of the district's State Savings Bank of Victoria (SSB) branches. He convinced the Bank's head office to sponsor a new competition involving children (under 12), representing their VFL club and playing in their club colours, to be played during the half-time break in the senior VFL game each Saturday. The SSB Mini League, which eventually evolved into the "Little League", conducted its first matches during the 1967 VFL season.
- Fitzroy moved to Carlton's home ground, Princes Park, sharing the ground on alternate weeks.
- Hawthorn, having instituted an exhaustive schedule of pre-season and regular in-season training developed by coach John Kennedy and former star centreman, now gymnasium owner, Brendan Edwards, as a consequence of them having undertaken this gruelling schedule in addition to their normal, on-going skills training, the Hawthorn players became known as "Kennedy's Commandos".
- On Anzac Day, a representative match was played at the Melbourne Cricket Ground between the Victorian team from the 1966 Hobart Carnival, and a team representing the rest of the league. The Carnival team wore Victoria's traditional Big V guernsey; the Rest team wore a red Guernsey with blue yoke and white collar. The Rest 18.13 (121) defeated the Carnival team 9.13 (67) in front of a crowd of 15,613.
- During the second quarter of the round 5 match between St Kilda and Carlton at Moorabbin Oval, one of the timekeepers unknowingly knocked off the power switch to the siren, leaving them unable to sound it for half time; attempts by the Carlton timekeeper to use the manual back-up bell went unheard by the umpire, and in the extra time it took St Kilda's timekeeper to run to the field and get the umpire's attention to the end of the quarter, Carlton's John Gill kicked a goal. Carlton went on to win by five points. The Moorabbin Oval siren's power switch was relocated and fitted with a warning light to prevent a recurrence; and all venue sirens were soon after fitted with back-up batteries.
- In the second semi-final between Richmond and Carlton Richmond's Neville Crowe and Carlton's John Nicholls were wrestling for the ball when Nicholls hit Crowe "in the guts", Crowe stepped back with the football grasped to his chest in his left hand and attempted to slap Nicholls with his open right hand. Crowe missed making any contact with Nicholls by about three inches. Nicholls immediately lifted his own left hand to his face, and pretended to have been badly affected, reeled away from Crowe. Despite Crowe's protests, he was reported for striking Nicholls. At the tribunal Crowe, received no assistance from Nicholls who was reluctant to admit that he was only acting. Crowe was suspended for four weeks; he missed the grand final, and never played VFL football again.
- At the end of the season, Harry Beitzel's squad of players drawn mainly from the VFL, known as "The Galahs", played matches in Ireland, England, and the United States.

== Awards ==
- The 1967 VFL Premiership team was Richmond (its first since 1943).
- The VFL's leading goalkicker was Doug Wade of Geelong who kicked 96 goals (including 17 goals in the final series).
- The winner of the 1967 Brownlow Medal was Ross G. Smith of St Kilda with 24 votes.
- Footscray took the "wooden spoon" in 1967.
- The reserves premiership was won by North Melbourne. North Melbourne 15.13 (103) defeated Richmond 10.19 (79) in the Grand Final, held as a curtain-raiser to the seniors Grand Final at the Melbourne Cricket Ground on 23 September.

== Sources ==
- 1967 VFL season at AFL Tables
- 1967 VFL season at Australian Football
