= 1967 VFL grand final =

Grand final of the 1967 Victorian Football League season

1967 VFL Grand Final

Richmond	Geelong
16.18 (114)	15.15 (105)
	1	2	3	4
RICH	4.3 (27)	9.10 (64)	12.15 (87)	16.18 (114)
GEE	3.3 (21)	7.6 (48)	13.7 (85)	15.15 (105)
- Date: 23 September 1967
- Stadium: Melbourne Cricket Ground
- Attendance: 109,396

Broadcast in Australia
- Network: Seven Network
- Commentators: Michael Williamson; Alan Gale; Ted Whitten

The 1967 VFL Grand Final was an Australian rules football game contested between the Richmond Football Club and Geelong Football Club at the Melbourne Cricket Ground on 23 September 1967. It was the 70th annual grand final of the Victorian Football League, staged to determine the premiers for the 1967 VFL season. The match, attended by 109,396 spectators, was won by Richmond by a margin of nine points, marking the club's sixth VFL premiership and their first since 1943.

== Background ==
After having last qualified for a VFL finals series in 1947, the Tigers made wholesale changes to the club in the 1960s in a bid to return to the top of the competition. In 1962, Graeme Richmond became club secretary and began instilling his trademark ruthless approach to the administration. In 1964, lawyer Ray Dunn became club president and was instrumental in moving the club's home games from Punt Road Oval to the MCG. That same year, Len Smith, brother of Melbourne premiership coach Norm, was appointed senior coach. Regarded as a pioneer of the modern game, Smith struggled with ill health during his tenure, but his trailblazing ideas and methods were embraced by his successor Tom Hafey, who took the reins in 1966. In what would be a closely contested season, the Tigers were sitting on top of the ladder at the end of Round 14, but losses to Collingwood and Geelong saw them fall out of the Top Four and end the season in fifth place.
In the lead-up to 1967, the Richmond committee replaced Neville Crowe with Fred Swift as club captain. Harnessing the disappointment of the previous season's close finish, and with the final pieces of the puzzle in place with the arrival of future captain Royce Hart, Graeme Bond and Kevin Sheedy, the Tigers won 15 games to take out their first minor premiership since 1944. Second-placed Carlton went into the Second Semi-final as the favourites due to Richmond's lack of finals experience; none of the Richmond players had ever played in a senior VFL final. But urged on by coach Hafey and secretary Richmond, the Tigers went into attack time and time again in the second half, eventually emerging winners by 40 points and qualifying directly for the Grand Final.

Mirroring the town's fortunes for the decade, Geelong had qualified for the last five VFL finals series, claiming the flag in 1963 under the coaching of Bob Davis, the captaincy of Fred Wooller and the brilliance of legendary ruckman Graham "Polly" Farmer. Davis was replaced by former teammate Peter Pianto as senior coach in 1966 and guided Geelong to third place, but poor kicking for goal in the last quarter of the First Semi-final against Essendon saw them lose by ten points. The Cats again finished third on the ladder in 1967 and faced fourth-placed Collingwood in the First Semi-final. The game had been a tight tussle for three quarters, but in the final quarter, the Cats unleashed a six-goal burst to turn a one-point lead into a comfortable 30-point victory. However, they had lost second ruck Sam Newman early in the game with what was later discovered to be severe internal bleeding from a ruptured kidney, making him unavailable for the remainder of the finals. In the Preliminary final against Carlton two weeks later, Geelong turned a 27-point half-time deficit into a 29-point win with a stunning second half that included eight goals to one in the third quarter.

== Teams ==
Richmond	Geelong

Richmond
B:	3 Roger Dean	15 Fred Swift (c)	39 Tony Jewell
HB:	27 Graham Burgin	22 Michael Perry	28 Geoff Strang
C:	8 Dick Clay	24 Bill Barrot	30 Francis Bourke
HF:	9 John Northey	1 Paddy Guinane	17 Barry Richardson
F:	2 John Ronaldson	4 Royce Hart	40 Bill Brown
Foll:	25 Mike Patterson	12 Alan Richardson	29 Kevin Bartlett
Res:	37 Michael Green	33 John Perry	
Coach:	Tom Hafey		

Geelong
B:	25 Geoff Ainsworth	31 Roy West	27 Geoff Rosenow
HB:	15 Terry Farman	34 Peter Walker	2 Denis Marshall
C:	3 Ken Newland	1 Wayne Closter	36 Tony Polinelli
HF:	10 John Sharrock	6 Gareth Andrews	16 Colin Eales
F:	8 Chris Mitchell	23 Doug Wade	12 Gordon Hynes
Foll:	5 Graham Farmer (c)	26 Bill Ryan	35 Bill Goggin
Res:	21 Ricky Graham	30 John Scarlett	
Coach:	Peter Pianto		

Umpires

The umpiring panel for the match, comprising one field umpire, two boundary umpires and two goal umpires is given below.

1967 VFL Grand Final umpires
Position			Emergency
Field:	Peter Sheales (1)		
Boundary:	Arthur Cook (4)	Richard Kidd (3)	
Goal:	Leslie Barratt (2)	Bryan Grant (1)	

Numbers in brackets represent the number of grand finals umpired, including 1967.

== Match summary ==
It was Richmond's first Grand Final since it lost the 1944 VFL Grand Final, while Geelong had most recently appeared in the 1963 VFL Grand Final. Richmond had finished atop the home-and-away ladder with a 15–3 record, and Geelong had finished third with 13–5.

=== First Quarter ===
The game began at a fast and furious pace. Geelong attacked from the first bounce, but it took six minutes before Gordon Hynes registered the first score – a behind. Shortly after, John Sharrock kicked the first goal of the match after taking a courageous mark. Geelong continued to attack and Doug Wade missed after marking close to goal. Richmond's first goal came after John Ronaldson, replacing the suspended Neville Crowe, was awarded a free kick in the forward pocket. Ronaldson's kick went off the side of his boot, but Royce Hart anticipated well to take an easy chest mark and goal. The Cats replied quickly through Bill Goggin, who roved the ball off a pack at top pace and drop-kicked a superb goal. Richmond fought back with goals to Alan “Bull” Richardson and Bill Brown, both from free kicks. Tempers started to flare as defender Graham Burgin repelled two Geelong attacks, the second time with a fine mark. Bill Barrot had started well and was driving Richmond into attack with long, penetrating kicks. Score at quarter time: Richmond 4.3 (27) to Geelong 3.3 (21)

=== Third Quarter ===
The score at half time was Richmond 9.10 (64) to Geelong 7.6 (48). Geelong came out firing in the third quarter and quickly erased the half-time deficit. Goggin goaled shortly after play restarted, and then Gareth Andrews then followed with a long goal, which seemed to swing back at the last moment. The Cats hit the front when Wade kicked truly from the boundary after receiving a free kick. Geelong was playing excellent football as Farmer palmed the ball to Goggin, who in turn passed to the dangerous Sharrock. Two rushed behinds gave Richmond the lead as the siren sounded for three-quarter time. Three quarter time score: Richmond 12.15 (87) to Geelong 13.7 (85).

=== Fourth Quarter ===
The stage was set for what would be an epic last quarter. From the centre bounce, Barrot won the ball and kicked long into attack. Guinane collected the ball in the right forward pocket but his kick went across the face of goal and out of bounds. From the throw-in, Ronaldson managed to tap the ball down to Bartlett, who ran onto the ball and snapped a goal to extend Richmond's lead to eight points. Both sides traded behinds before the Cats got their first goal of the term at the 10-minute mark through Ryan, who marked a superb drop-kick pass from Walker 30 yards out from goal directly in front, and kicked truly to bring the margin back to two points.

The lead changed several times in the quarter. At the 18 minute mark with Geelong holding a 6-point lead, John Ronaldson marked about 60 yards out on the flank and slotted an unlikely goal leveling the scores. Geelong scored a point followed by Richmond a few minutes later and at the 23 minute mark the scores were level again. Ronaldson, kicking from 55 yards on the opposite flank scored a goal at the 25 minute mark followed by Kevin Bartlett goaling at the 28 minute mark sealing the game. The closing minutes played at a furious pace by both teams despite the tiredness of the players including a defensive captains' mark by Fred Swift (playing in his last VFL game) on the Geelong goal-line,

== Post-match reactions and epilogue ==
The 1967 VFL Grand Final has been hailed as a classic in the annals of great grand finals. In his article for the Canberra Times, published the day after the match, Rohan Rivett praised the skill standard of both teams while dismissing the doomsayers who decried the "modern" style of football:

When the siren sounded, scarcely a soul moved for the exits. The second biggest crowd in grand final history, 109,396 people stood and applauded all 36 players, because in this game victor and vanquished gave their all in the most spectacular exhibition of the code even the oldest connoisseurs can recall.
Soul-searching about the game in recent years has not been confined to the old and bold who deplore the insistence of play-on tactics and speed at all costs which has robbed the spectator of the placekicking, the expert stabpassing, and other finer arts familiar to the prewar generation. More vitally, the mounting injury rate, despite modern panaceas in the dressing room, has suggested that Victorian league finals might come to be won by the biggest and toughest rather than the most talented.
Yesterday indicated to all that this may be an illusion.

Victorious premiership captain Fred Swift said:

It's the biggest thrill of my life. It really makes it worth while playing football after today's win. It was close, and at times I thought we might not win. But every player pulled his weight and I have never felt so happy. I'll never forget the thrill of running around ground holding the premiership cup. It's a thing you dream about – but today it came true.

Geelong captain Graham Farmer was gracious in defeat:

Our mistakes – free kicks, a couple of fumbles and miskicks – cost us the game. We looked like winning for most of the game, but we did not kick straight enough. Richmond was fortunate to get a goal in the final minutes. Richmond's win was good for football. Premierships are made to go around.

There was no official best on being award. A panel which viewed the game retrospectively for the AFL Record's Grand Final edition in 2001, consisting of Sam Newman (who in 1967 watched the game on television from hospital while recovering from emergency surgery), former AFL CEO Wayne Jackson and football journalist Mike Sheahan, voted Bill Goggin as the best player on the day, with 20 kicks, ten handpasses and three goals. Kevin Bartlett and Royce Hart also received votes for their performances.

Richmond, under the coaching of Tom Hafey, won three further premierships: in 1969, in 1973, and in 1974.

== Scorecard ==
1967 VFL Grand Final
Saturday, 23 September 2:30pm	Richmond	def.	Geelong	MCG (crowd: 109,396)	Report
4.3 (27); 9.10 (64); 12.15 (87); 16.18 (114)	Q1; Q2; Q3; Final	3.3 (21); 7.6 (48); 13.7 (85); 15.15 (105)	Umpires: Sheales; Television broadcast: Seven Network
Bartlett, Brown, Hart, Ronaldson 3 Barrot, Guinane, A. Richardson, B. Richardson 1	Goals	4 Sharrock, Wade; 3 Goggin; 1 Andrews, Eales, Hynes, Ryan
Barrot, Bartlett, Hart, Brown, A. Richardson, Dean, M. Perry, B. Richardson	Best	Goggin, Sharrock, Polinelli, Farmer, West, Andrews, Newland, Ainsworth
Nil	Injuries	Nil
Nil	Reports	Nil

== See also ==
- Fred Swift
- 1967 VFL season
