= Fred Swift =

Australian rules footballer

Personal information
- Full name: Frederick Norman Swift
- Born: 6 July 1938
- Died: 28 April 1983 (aged 44); Lockwood, Victoria
- Original team: Sandhurst (BFL)
- Height: 183 cm (6 ft 0 in)
- Weight: 83 kg (183 lb)
- Position: Utility

Playing career^{1}
| Years | Club | Games (Goals) |
| 1958–1967 | Richmond | 146 (41) |

Representative team honours^{2}
| Years | Team | Games (Goals) |
| 1961 | Victoria | 2 |
- ^{1} Playing statistics correct to the end of 1967.^{2} Representative statistics correct as of 1961.

Career highlights
- VFL Premiership player: (1967); Richmond captain: (1967)

Frederick Norman Swift (6 July 1938 – 28 April 1983) was an Australian rules footballer who played for the Richmond Football Club in the Victorian Football League (VFL). He also played first grade cricket with the Eaglehawk Cricket Club in the Bendigo and District Cricket Association.

Swift has a special place in the history of the Richmond Football Club as the captain of the drought-breaking 1967 premiership team. He was murdered during a home invasion at his farm at Lockwood, near Bendigo, Victoria, at the age of 44.

== Career ==
=== Sandhurst ===
Swift was recruited as a utility player from the Sandhurst Football Club in the Bendigo Football League. He played with their senior team, coached by Kevin Curran (and playing alongside Brendan Edwards), from the time he was seventeen and, at 19, he was the youngest player ever to win the club's best and fairest award.

=== Richmond ===
Swift played in two practice matches with Richmond in 1957 but was not given a full, extended clearance; and he consequently returned to Sandhurst for the 1957 season.

In early March 1958, Richmond were able to come to an agreement with Sandhurst and Swift was allowed to travel to Melbourne to train with Richmond.

He starred in Richmond's 1958 pre-season practice games – "he marked well, played on with determination once the ball hit the ground, and frequently sent his side into attack with long, driving kicks into the goal mouth" – and, by mid-April 1958, nineteen years old Swift, regarded by Richmond as the "recruit of the year", was finally cleared to the Tigers.

Because it seemed certain that he would "definitely play for the Tigers in the opening game against South Melbourne", it was thought during the week prior to the first match of the 1958 season that he had so well demonstrated his ability to play at centre-half forward, half-back flank, and centre ("where he gave what was probably his most impressive performance") that "he could fill any one of these positions in the game against South"; and, moreover, that "his natural ability is such that he would probably be successful no matter where he is played".

Although Swift had played at full-back at Sandhurst, he had not played full-back in any of Richmond's 1957 or 1958 practice matches; he had "played brilliantly at centre" during the practice matches in 1958 and had satisfied Richmond that he could "play in any position" – to such an extent that the Wednesday Age speculated that he would be picked at full-back, in place of the injured Allan Cations on the following Saturday. He was, however, picked on the half-forward flank for his first senior game, in round 1, against South Melbourne.

=== Debut with Richmond ===
At nineteen, he played his first senior game for Richmond against South Melbourne in the first round of the 1958 season on the half-forward flank. Richmond unexpectedly beat South Melbourne, and Swift kicked one goal. One of the football writers of The Age commenting on his debut, said that, "Fred Swift was strange early but in the last quarter showed good football sense and ability on his half-forward flank. He should develop into a useful player.

He was a highly talented footballer, with great anticipation, and highly polished ball skills, and he was equally at home in the forward line – he kicked 5 goals against Fitzroy in round 18, 1966; and, when moved from center half-back to full-forward, in the last quarter against St Kilda in round 6, 1959, he kicked 3 goals, in a losing side – wing, centre, or in defence".

=== Reserves ===
In his entire career with Richmond, he only played five games with the second eighteen. He did not play his first match with the seconds until the round 16 match against Carlton at Princes Park on Saturday, 24 August 1963, by which time he had already played 83 senior games. Playing at centre half-forward, he was best on the ground, kicking 3 goals.

=== Interstate football ===
Given Richmond's place on the VFL ladder, only one Richmond player could be selected in the Victorian Interstate team for the fifteenth Australian National Football Carnival, that would be held in Brisbane in 1961. Ruckman Neville Crowe, was selected. In the interim, Crowe had injured his knee, and was forced to withdraw from the team. Richmond paid for Crowe's expenses to travel to the carnival with the team, and the allocated Richmond place in the Victorian team was taken by Swift. The Victorian team was coached by Len Smith.

Swift played in both of Victoria's matches. He played on the half-back flank in the first match against Tasmania on 19 July 1961, until he injured his ankle and was replaced; Victoria won by 61 points: 23.30 (150) to 12.17 (89).

His ankle recovered and he played, again on the half-back flank, in the Victorian team that finished with 17 men, that was comprehensively beaten in an extremely rough and tough match by West Australian team, on Sunday, 24 July, by 9 points: 15.14 (104) to 14.11 (95). The West Australian team won the carnival competition; coached by Jack Sheedy, the team included John Todd, Graham "Polly" Farmer, Ray Gabelich, Jack "Stork" Clarke, and Ray Sorrell.

=== 1962 night premiership ===
Richmond played its first match against Fitzroy on Tuesday 4 September 1962 with Swift at full-back. Richmond beat Fitzroy 12.9 (81) to 9.10 (64).

In the semi-final match, on Friday, 14 September 1962, Richmond played against the strong favourites North Melbourne. Swift played at full-back, and was best on the ground. Richmond beat North Melbourne 12.13 (85) to 9.8 (62).

The final match of the series was originally scheduled to be played at the Lake Oval on Monday, 24 September 1962, but was moved to Wednesday, 26 September 1962 because of bad weather.

In the Grand Final, Swift was again best on the ground, playing at full-back against Hawthorn's John Peck, and as the team's captain in Richmond's only ever Night Premiership victory: "Swift played a superb game at full-back repelling Hawthorn’s forward thrusts and marking everything that came his way" (Hogan, 1996, p. 300) and, according to the press, "his superb defensive play, in that game, was the difference between victory and defeat" (Hogan, 1996, p. 224). Richmond 8.16 (64) defeated Hawthorn 9.6 (60).

=== Injuries in 1966 ===
In the first four matches of 1966, Swift played at full-forward, kicking a total of 10 goals. His knee was badly injured in the last quarter of the round 4 match against Collingwood, and it was feared that he might not play again that season.

However, his knee did eventually come good; and, whilst playing a couple of matches in the Second Eighteen, to get back his touch and his match fitness, he broke a bone in his hand. This meant that he was not fit to resume his place in the senior team until the last round match against Fitzroy. He was selected at full-forward, and he kicked 5 goals.

=== Full-back ===
Although playing with a suspect knee for his last few seasons at Richmond, Swift always gave his best; and, considering his knee problems, he had a surprising turn of speed. He ended his career at full-back, having played as a half-forward flanker and ruck-rover for his last few seasons, and only moving to full-back in the last half of his last season, in place of the injured Mick Erwin. Jack Dyer had suggested the move, on the basis of his own experience with a similar sort of knee injury, Dyer argued that, of all the positions on the field, full-back was the best for Swift, because he would have almost all of his play in front of him, and almost all of his running would be straight ahead, with a minimum of turns and sideways movement. In his first full match in 1967 at full-back, in Round 16 against Hawthorn at Glenferrie Oval, despite fears that he was too short to play against Hawthorn's champion full-forward, Peter Hudson, who was 3½ inches taller, Swift held Hudson to three goals, and Richmond won the match, thrashing Hawthorn 23.30 (168) to 7.12 (54).

=== 1967 VFL Grand Final ===
In his final game, the 1967 Grand Final against Geelong, he not only captained his team to a premiership, but he was one of the best on the ground, somewhat nullifying the impact of the temperamental Geelong hairdresser and champion full-forward, Doug Wade, who was nearly five inches (11 cm) taller and more than two stone heavier (14 kg), and was widely expected to out-class Swift. Wade, the season's top goal-kicker, who had scored 79 goals during the home-and-away section of the season (including 6 goals against Swift, and Richmond, in round 18), and 8 and 5 goals in the semi-final and preliminary finals against Collingwood and Carlton respectively, was clearly outplayed in the Grand Final, and was held to just 4 goals by Swift.

Although Geelong was the first to score, Richmond was a goal in front by quarter time: 4.3 (27) to 3.3 (21). By half time, Richmond had increased its lead to 16 points: 9.10 (64) to 7.6 (48). Geelong fought back during the third quarter and, at one stage, led by 14 points; however, Richmond counter-attacked and the scores were level. And, then, two rushed behinds right at the end of the quarter, saw Richmond two points ahead at three-quarter time: 12.15 (87) to 13.7 (85).

During the final quarters, the lead changed multiple times between Richmond and Geelong. The teams traded their goals and were tied by three separate occasions and before the period of time on began.

Richmond's John Ronaldson kicked a goal (his third for the match) to put Richmond six points ahead, and then a goal from Kevin Bartlett, backing out of the pack, increased Richmond's lead to twelve points. Geelong then ferociously surged back into the game when "Polly" Farmer (playing his last game for Geelong) handpassed the ball to Wayne Closter, who kicked the ball goal-wards towards Wade (Geelong's no.10) somewhere between centre-half forward and full-forward.

An almost exhausted Swift (Richmond's no.15; and, as always, with the 5 askew), with great anticipation, leapt high in front of Wade and palmed the ball away to his right from in front of the pack. He raced back towards the goal square, just in time to intercept a kick from Colin Eales and, to add insult to injury, ran across the face of goal, bounced the ball, with Wade in hot pursuit, and calmly passed the ball to John Perry.

Both Tony Polinelli and Bill Ryan kicked poorly, each scoring a behind, placing Geelong ten points behind; and then, with plenty of time for Geelong to get another goal, and breaking out of a pack, Goggin punt-kicked what seemed certain to be a goal (which would have reduced the lead to a dangerous four points).

Swift – already tired from having to captain his team, counteract Wade, and kicked the ball back into play after the eight behinds that Geelong had scored up to that moment in the last quarter), single-mindedly concentrating on his task, took one of the finest marks of his career at the Punt Road end of the M.C.G.

With the strong September afternoon sun shining directly into his eyes, without any opposition (with the goal umpire crouching in a perfect position to determine its legality), he first caught the ball perhaps ten feet above the ground (3m), right on the goal line, to turn Geelong away, and retain Richmond's lead of ten points. He played on, and his clearing drop-kick almost hit the centre.

"It's the biggest thrill in my life. It really makes it worth while playing football after today's win. It was close, and at times I thought we might not win. But every player pulled his weight and I have never felt so happy. I'll never forget the thrill of running around the ground holding the premiership cup. It's a thing you dream about – but today it came true." – Fred Swift after his team's win

Moments later, Polinelli surged up the ground kicked Geelong's ninth behind for the quarter; and, as Polinelli's kick went through, the siren sounded, with Richmond finally winning by nine points 16.18 (114) to 15.15 (105).

=== Retirement from Richmond ===
Immediately after the Grand Final, he announced his retirement.

In the following week, Swift was made the Lord Mayor of Richmond City for the day; and a photograph appeared in the Melbourne press, entitled "The day Richmond belonged to him", with Swift, in full mayoral regalia, looking down over the City of Richmond from the roof of the Richmond Town Hall.

Richmond did all it could to induce Swift's to stay in the following week, but he was adamant that he would not change his mind, and they parted on friendly terms.

It is also significant to note that, although Swift tasted success as the captain of a premiership team, coached by Tom Hafey (who had played beside Swift in the Richmond first eighteen in the 1957 and 1958 seasons), in his last season with Richmond, he had also experienced Richmond being far from successful for most of his career; and, when examined year by year, Swift's career of 146 senior games clearly shows the extent to which he (and Richmond) had experienced hard times: 1958 season, he played 16 senior games (Richmond was 10th, out of 12 teams, at the end of the home-and-away season); 1959, 7 games (11th); 1960, 18 games (last); 1961, 15 games (10th) (in round 16, Swift played in the centre of a Richmond team that was beaten by St Kilda 12.19 (91) to 0.8 (8), the first time that a senior VFL team had failed to score a goal since round 11, 1921); 1962, 18 games (8th); 1963, 12 games (10th); 1964, 18 games (9th); 1965, 17 games (5th); 1966, 5 games (5th); 1967, 18 games (first), plus the second semi-final and the Grand-Final (premiers).

=== Coaching career ===
In his own time with Sandhurst, he had been coached by former Hawthorn rover, by then playing as a ruckman, Kevin Curran, and by former North Melbourne wingman, Leo Francis. At Richmond he had been coached by Alan McDonald, Des Rowe, Len Smith, Jack Titus, and Tom Hafey.

In 1968, Swift was appointed captain-coach of the Corowa Football Club. Under Swift's guidance the team, which had taken the wooden spoon in 1967, went on to win the premiership in 1968 from fourth position. Corowa beat North Albury in the first semi-final, beat Myrtleford in the preliminary final 11.19 (85) to 8.13 (61), and went to beat the hot favourite team Wodonga (coached by ex-Collingwood rover Mick Bone) in the Grand Final 14.11 (95) to 12.16 (88), with Swift playing at full-back. Swift was also the captain-coach of the Corowa in 1969.

He was captain-coach of the Morwell Football Club (also known as "The Tigers") in 1970–1972, and coach of the Kennington/Strathdale Football Club in 1978–1979.

=== Record ===
- 1953–1954: Sandhurst Football Club, Third Eighteen: Captain and best and fairest.
- 1955–1957: Sandhurst Football Club, First Eighteen: 60 games, 20 goals, best and fairest (1957).
- 1958–1967: Richmond Football Club, First Eighteen: 146 games, 41 goals.
- 1958–1967: Brownlow Medal: 18 votes.
- 1958: Richmond Football Club, First Eighteen: Best First Year Player.
- 1960: Richmond Football Club, First Eighteen: Runner-up, best and fairest.
- 1961: Victorian Representative Team: 2 games.
- 1962: Richmond Football Club, First Eighteen: Captain, Night Premiership Team.
- 1963, 1966: Richmond Football Club, First Eighteen: Vice-Captain.
- 1963, 1966: Richmond Football Club, Second Eighteen: 5 games, 3 goals.
- 1964: Richmond Football Club, First Eighteen: Third, best and fairest.
- 1965: Richmond Football Club: Life Membership.
- 1967: Richmond Football Club, First Eighteen: Captain, Premiership Team.
- 1968–1969: Corowa Football Club: Captain-Coach, Premiership coach (1968), 30 games, 17 goals.
- 1970–1972: Morwell Football Club: Captain-Coach, 52 games, 29 goals.
- 1978–1979: Kennington/Strathdale Football Club: Coach.

== After football ==
After his time with the Kennington/Strathdale Football Club he moved back to the Bendigo area and took up farming.

== Murder ==
At around midday on Thursday, 28 April 1983, two young men, Robert William Larson (born 13 March 1965) of Ophir Street, Bendigo, and Malcolm David Lee, of Violet Street, Bendigo, armed with a sawn-off .22 calibre rifle and disguised with balaclavas, invaded Swift's family property at Lockwood (10 km southwest of Bendigo) while he was absent. They had chosen to rob Swift's property in order to supplement their unemployment benefits. According to the account of Tom Hafey, a former Richmond team-mate, coach, and long-time friend of Swift, "The kids [who killed him] knew the layout of the house. Fred used to take them fishing".

They tied up his wife (Anita Charlotte Swift) and son (Paul Andrew Swift) and began ransacking the house.

Swift arrived home soon after Larson and Lee's invasion. Going into the house to investigate the commotion, he was confronted by the two youths and shot in the heart and in the thigh. He died almost immediately from his wounds. His body was not moved until nearly 6 pm that afternoon.

His murderers escaped in Swift's car. Larson was identified by Paul Swift (who had first met Larson two years earlier); and, despite Larson's disguise, Paul was able to identify him by his voice, his eyes, his build, and his clothing. Paul also identified Larson as the one who had been armed with the sawn-off .22 calibre rifle. The police immediately set up road blocks, and began to search the surrounding area. Swift's car, a dark blue XC Ford Falcon, was found abandoned in bushland several kilometres from the scene of the murder. The police arrested both of his murderers late that afternoon.

== Jack Dyer's eulogy on World of Sport ==
At the time of Swift's death, the entire football community was deeply shocked.

On the morning of the following Sunday (1 May 1983), Ron Casey, host of the television programme World of Sport, without any prior warning, unexpectedly asked one of the show's stars, the sports journalist, Richmond legend, former Richmond coach, and Richmond selector Jack Dyer, who had been responsible for suggesting Swift's move to full-back in 1967 in place of Mick Erwin, to deliver what amounted to a eulogy. Dyer refused outright, and a very fierce argument broke out between Casey and Dyer; with Casey's will, as host of the programme, prevailing.

Many of the viewers, already deeply upset at the murder of such a brave, honest, courageous, and well-loved man apparently killed in defence of his family, were further affected by the mournful manner in which Dyer, who deeply respected and admired Swift, spoke. It was only later revealed that the reason for Dyer's initial refusal to speak on air, and his actual refusal to look into the camera whilst speaking – having been forced against his will, by Casey, to deliver the eulogy – was solely due to his having left his false teeth at home (a fact that he refused to reveal to Casey or anyone else at the time), and had nothing to do with any reluctance to acknowledge his own personal sense of great loss at Swift's murder.

== Murder trial ==
On Monday, 2 May 1983, both Larson and Lee were charged with Swift's murder. They were also charged with the unlawful imprisonment of Anita Charlotte Swift and Paul Andrew Swift, and having committed a robbery while armed with a rifle. Prior to the trial, the unlawful imprisonment charges were dropped, and both men were charged with murder and both were charged with armed robbery.

According to the trial transcript (VR 559, p. 564) a clinical psychologist, Bernard Healey, had comprehensively tested Larson in May 1983 and found "that Larson [had] an I.Q. of 80, which [placed] him at the lowest end of the dull range of intelligence and at about 9 per centum amongst people of his age".

In November 1983, a jury found Larson guilty of murder and armed robbery, and found Lee guilty of manslaughter and armed robbery; they were sentenced, by Mr. Justice Hampel, to life imprisonment and seven years' gaol respectively on Monday, 12 December 1983.

Four and a half years later, on 30 March 1988, Larson escaped from custody at the Melbourne City Watch-house in company with Paul Alexander Anderson (who had been imprisoned for car theft and other convictions). They were both recaptured in Adelaide, charged with firearms offences, and extradited back to Victoria.

Later, in 1992, Larson was again incarcerated for armed robbery, and was convicted twice in the first part of 2003, for separate assaults on police.

In November 2003, Larson (who was now living in Preston) appeared in court, facing 13 charges rising from an entirely unprovoked knife attack on three unarmed cleaners at Southbank at 2:00 am on 29 September 2003.

== Remembered ==
He played with strength at full-back, through injury and, on at least one occasion, played with a broken bone in his arm (Hogan, 1996, p. 224). Although predominantly a right foot kick, he could kick with either foot.

At Richmond Football Club, he was regarded as a respected and popular member, noted for supporting new recruits and taking an active interest in the development and integration of younger players. (Hogan, 1996, p. 224).

A grandstand at the home ground of the Corowa Football Club was named The Fred Swift Stand in his honour.

In 1986, he was posthumously inducted into the Bendigo Football League's Hall of Fame.

The "Fred Swift Medal" is awarded in his honour each season to the player who finishes fourth in Richmond's best and fairest count.

== Bibliography ==
- Hogan P: The Tigers of Old, Richmond FC, Melbourne 1996
- Holmesby, Russell and Main, Jim (2007). The Encyclopedia of AFL Footballers. 7th ed. Melbourne: Bas Publishing.
- Prior, T., Sheeds: A Touch of Cunning, Wilkinson Books, (Melbourne), 1995.
- Supreme Court of Victoria, Victorian Reports: R v LARSON and LEE – 1984 VR 559
