= 1969 Championship of Australia =

Richmond	Sturt
15.27 (117)	9.10 (64)
	1	2	3	4
RIC	6.6 (42)	11.14 (80)	13.24 (102)	15.27 (117)
STU	1.1 (7)	3.2 (20)	5.3 (33)	9.10 (64)
- Date: 11 October 1969
- Stadium: Adelaide Oval
- Attendance: 32,600
- Umpires: Murray Ducker

The 1969 Championship of Australia was the 13th edition of the Championship of Australia, an ANFC-organised national club Australian rules football match between the champion clubs from the VFL and the SANFL.

== Qualified Teams ==
Team	Nickname	League	Qualification	Participation (bold indicates winners)
Richmond	Tigers	VFL	Winners of the 1969 Victorian Football League	1st
Sturt	Double Blues	SANFL	Winners of the 1969 South Australian National Football League	2nd (Previous: 1968)

== Venue ==
- Adelaide Oval (Capacity: **64,000**)

== Match details ==
=== Championship of Australia ===
11 October 1969	**Richmond**	**117-64**	**Sturt**	Adelaide Oval, Adelaide
	6.6 (42); 11.14 (80); 13.24 (102); 15.27 (117)		1.1 (7); 3.2 (20); 5.3 (33); 9.10 (64)	Attendance: 32,600; Umpires: Murray Ducker
		**Goals**
	E Moore 5 B Brown 3 K Bartlett, B Barrot 2 J Ronaldson, R Dean, J Northey 1		R Shearman, M Greenslade, J Tilbrook 2 P Endersbee, R Rigney, K Chessell 1
