= 1969 VFL grand final =

Grand final of the 1969 Victorian Football League season

1969 VFL Grand Final

Richmond	Carlton
12.13 (85)	8.12 (60)
	1	2	3	4
RIC	2.2 (14)	6.5 (41)	8.6 (54)	12.13 (85)
CAR	1.4 (10)	2.7 (19)	8.10 (58)	8.12 (60)
- Date: 27 September 1969
- Stadium: Melbourne Cricket Ground
- Attendance: 119,165

The 1969 VFL Grand Final was an Australian rules football game contested between the Carlton Football Club and Richmond Football Club, held at the Melbourne Cricket Ground in Melbourne on 27 September 1969. It was the 72nd annual Grand Final of the Victorian Football League, staged to determine the premiers for the 1969 VFL season. The match, attended by 119,165 spectators, was won by Richmond by a margin of 25 points, marking that club's seventh VFL/AFL premiership victory.

Richmond had only qualified for the finals on percentage and were underdogs coming into the game, with Carlton being the reigning premiers.

The game's attendance of 119,165 represented the most spectators to have witnessed a premiership decider in VFL Grand Final history, breaking the record of 116,828 spectators who witnessed the 1968 VFL Grand Final. The record was subsequently broken again in the 1970 VFL Grand Final.

== Teams ==
Richmond	Carlton

Richmond
B:	10 Kevin Sheedy	17 Barry Richardson	16 Colin Beard
HB:	28 Geoff Strang	27 Graham Burgin	52 Ian Owen
C:	8 Dick Clay	24 Bill Barrot	30 Francis Bourke
HF:	9 John Northey	4 Royce Hart	3 Roger Dean (c)
F:	2 John Ronaldson	7 Eric Moore	40 Bill Brown
Foll:	37 Michael Green	11 Michael Bowden	29 Kevin Bartlett
Res:	5 Rex Hunt	44 Graeme Bond	
Coach:	Tom Hafey		

Carlton
B:	21 Barry Gill	20 Wes Lofts (vc)	30 Vin Waite
HB:	15 Phillip Pinnell	11 John Goold	3 Kevin Hall
C:	6 Garry Crane	34 Ian Robertson	32 Bryan Quirk
HF:	5 Syd Jackson	42 Robert Walls	17 Brent Crosswell
F:	28 Peter Jones	25 Alex Jesaulenko	23 Ian Nicoll
Foll:	2 John Nicholls (c)	1 Sergio Silvagni	10 Adrian Gallagher
Res:	19 Ian Collins	7 Ted Hopkins	
Coach:	Ron Barassi		

== Summary ==
1969 VFL Grand Final
Saturday 27 September 1969 2:50pm	Richmond	def.	Carlton	MCG (crowd: 119,165)	Report
2.2 (14); 6.5 (41); 8.6 (54); 12.13 (85)	Q1; Q2; Q3; Final	1.4 (10); 2.7 (19); 8.10 (58); 8.12 (60)	Umpires: Crouch; Television broadcast: ABC
Barrot 3 Moore, Northey 2 Bartlett, Bond, Dean, Hart, Ronaldson 1	Goals	2 Jackson, Nicholls; 1 Crosswell, Jesaulenko, Gallagher, Walls
Green, Bartlett, Clay, Barrot, Northey, Dean	Best	Quirk, Crane, Silvagni, Lofts, Walls, Goold
Richmond won their second premiership in three years, defeating Carlton by 25 points. The Blues led by four points at three-quarter but were held to two points in the last quarter.

== See also ==
- 1969 VFL season
