= Barrot =

Barrot is a surname. Notable people with the surname include:

== French politicians and diplomats ==
- Adolphe Barrot (1801–1870), French diplomat
- Ferdinand Barrot (1806–1883), French politician
- Jacques Barrot (1937–2014), French politician
- Jean-Noël Barrot (born 1983), MoDem politician, Europe minister since 2025
- Odilon Barrot (1791–1873), French politician

== Other ==
- Bill Barrot (1944–2016), Australian rules football player
- Wes Barrot (born 1953), Australian rules football player
