= Herb Matthews =

Herb Matthews may refer to:

- Herb Matthews Sr. (1894–1964), Australian rules footballer for South Melbourne, Richmond and Melbourne
- Herbie Matthews (1913–1990), son of Herb, Australian rules footballer for South Melbourne
- Herb Matthews Jr. (born 1943), son of Herbie, Australian rules footballer for Melbourne and South Melbourne
