= Australian Football World Tour =

The Australian Football World Tour was a series of international rules football matches, organised by football sports broadcaster and former VFL umpire Harry Beitzel and Irish-born Melburnian James Harkin, in 1967 and 1968.

== First tour ==
The first team was christened "The Galahs" by the Melbourne press after a comment made by the eccentric athletics coach Percy Cerutty, having seen their garish blazers, their slouch hats, and their hats' ostentatious plumes (deliberately chosen by Beitzel to evoke comparisons with the heroes of the Australian Light Horse Regiments in the Boer War and World War I) and to the effect that they were "a pack of galahs". The name stuck.

The games were played under the rules of Gaelic football with the single exception that the Australian players were not compelled to "toe" the ball from foot to hand every few yards, and they were allowed to bounce the ball.

== First tour's itinerary ==
Their matches, opponents, and scores were as follows:

- Tuesday, 24 October 1967: The Galahs began their trip with an exhibition match of Australian rules against a Northern Territory Football League representative side in Darwin. Played in sweltering conditions in front of a crowd of 4,000 spectators at Gardens Oval, the Galahs defeated the NTFL by 69 points, 18.15 (123) to 7.12 (54), with Royce Hart booting seven goals.
- Saturday, 28 October 1967: Civil Service, a Dublin club team, preliminary warm-up match. The Galahs won by two points.
- Sunday, 29 October 1967: The 1967 All-Ireland Senior Football Champions Meath, the first touring match, played at Croke Park, and won by The Galahs 3-16 (25) to 1-10 (13) in front of 23,149 people.
- Tuesday, 31 October 1967: Exhibition match of Australian Rules Football, conducted in heavy rain, under lights, at London's Crystal Palace between "Australia" and "Britain". The Britain team was composed mainly of expatriates, plus several of The Galahs (including Alex Jesaulenko). Australia beat Britain 101 to 75.
- Saturday, 4 November: Mayo, the 1967 Connacht Senior Football Championship winners, played at Croke Park (incidentally the first time Gaelic football was played on a Saturday afternoon at the venue), and won by The Galahs 2-12 (18) to 2-5 (11) in front of an attendance of 20,121.
- Sunday, 5 November: New York, played at Gaelic Park, New York City. The Galahs lost the match 4-8 (20) to 0-5 (5), the visitors not managing a score after half time. Hassa Mann, king-hit behind the play, had his jaw broken in three places. Ron Barassi had his nose broken by a giant New York narcotics detective (Brendan Tumulty), who broke his own thumb in the process of hitting Barassi.

== 1967 touring party ==
Original selections
Harry Beitzel (Ex-umpire, promoter)
Ron Barassi (Carlton, playing coach)
Bob Skilton (South Melbourne)
Herb Matthews, Jr.(South Melbourne)
Stuart Magee (South Melbourne)
Norm Brown (Fitzroy)
Hassa Mann (Melbourne)
Don Williams (Melbourne)
Barry Davis (Essendon)
Ken Fraser (Essendon)
John Dugdale (North Melbourne)
Laurie Dwyer (North Melbourne)
Royce Hart (Richmond)
Paddy Guinane (Richmond)
Bill Barrot (Richmond)
Neville Crowe (Richmond)
Alex Jesaulenko (Carlton)
John Nicholls (Carlton)
John Jillard (Footscray)
Graeme Chalmers (Footscray)
Ian Law (Hawthorn)

Later additions to original selections
Bob Keddie (Hawthorn)
Peter Body (Sydney Naval^{[usurped]})
Roger Dean (Richmond)

== Second tour ==
In 1968, a second representative team, consisting of elite players from the Victorian Football League, South Australian National Football League, West Australian Football League and the Victorian Football Association, was undefeated in the series, playing against Gaelic football teams at Wembley Stadium and Croke Park. Dublin, Meath, Kerry and New York were among the opponents. The Galahs also played exhibition matches of Australian Rules Football throughout the tour, including a game in Bucharest, Romania.

== 1968 touring party ==
Victorian Football League
Harry Beitzel (Ex-umpire, promoter)
Ron Barassi (Carlton, playing coach)
Kevin Bartlett (Richmond)
Gary Dempsey (Footscray)
John Dugdale (North Melbourne)
Bob Farmer (Collingwood)
Royce Hart (Richmond)
Peter Hudson (Hawthorn)
Sydney Jackson (Carlton)
Alex Jesaulenko (Carlton)
R. Tassie Johnson (Melbourne)
Don McKenzie (Essendon)
Des Meagher (Hawthorn)
John Nicholls (Carlton)
Daryl O'Brien (North Melbourne)
Bryan Quirk (Carlton)
Wayne Richardson (Collingwood)
Brian Roet (Melbourne)
John Sharrock (Geelong)
David Thorpe (Footscray)

South Australian National Football League
John Birt (West Torrens)
Neil Kerley (Glenelg)

West Australian Football League
David Dyson (West Perth)
Graham Farmer (West Perth)
Murray Leeder (West Perth)
Bill Walker (Swan Districts)
John Wynne (West Perth)

Victorian Football Association
Fred Bayes (Box Hill)
Geoff Bryant (Box Hill)
Trevor Collins (Camberwell)
Gary Fenton (Sandringham)
Geoff Slade (Frankston)

Other leagues
Mike O'Brien (Redan, Ballarat Football League)
Greg Tootell (Caulfield Grammarians, VAFA)
Roger Hoggett (NSW)
