= Michael Perry (footballer) =

Australian rules footballer

Personal information
- Full name: Michael Wykeham Perry
- Born: 16 May 1944 (age 82); Prahran, Victoria
- Original team: Old Scotch Collegians (VAFA)
- Height: 191 cm (6 ft 3 in)
- Weight: 93.5 kg (206 lb)

Playing career^{1}
Years	Club	Games (Goals)
1965–1969	Richmond	72 (12)
- ^{1} Playing statistics correct to the end of 1969.

Career highlights
- Richmond Premiership Player 1967; Richmond Reserves Premiership Player 1971; Interstate Games: 1967

Michael Wykeham Perry (born 16 May 1944) is a former Australian rules football player who played in the VFL between 1965 and 1969 for the Richmond Football Club.

== Family ==
The son of Charles Wykeham William Perry (1910-), and Edith Rhoda Jean Perry (1916-), née McLeod, Michael Wykeham Perry was born at the Margaret Coles Maternity Hospital, in Prahran, Victoria. on 16 May 1944.

== Education ==
Perry studied at the Scotch College from 1958 to 1962.

== Football ==
=== Old Scotch Collegians (VAFA) ===
Perry played two seasons for Scotch Old Collegians Football Club in the Victorian Amateur Football Association (1963 and 1964, 38 games). He won their Best and Fairest Trophy each season, and was selected for the VAFA Representative side in 1964 (at 20 years of age).

=== Richmond VFL ===
Perry was recruited by Richmond in 1965, and eventually became a fixture at centre-half-back.

In Perry's second senior match, against St Kilda on 1 May 1965, his jaw was broken, and he did not play another senior match that season.

By 1967, he was a fixture on the Richmond side at centre half-back. He was centre half-back in Richmond's first premiership team since 1944, when Richmond beat Geelong 16.18 (114) to 15.15 (105).

He was centre half-back for the Victorian State team that defeated Western Australia, 20.15 (135) to 11.16 (82), on the MCG on 17 June 1967.

He played the entire 1968 and 1969 seasons for Richmond's senior side, missing Richmond's 1969 Grand Final winning team because of a four-game suspension for striking Footscray's Tad Joniec in the last home-and-away match of the 1969 season.

=== After 1969 ===
Although he was unable to play any more senior grade VFL due to an injury, he continued to play satisfactorily at a lower level for a number of years:

- 1970: Richmond Reserves.
- 1971: Richmond Reserves, including the 1971 Reserves Premiership (thus, from 1965 to the end of 1971, Mike had played 1 Victorian Representative game, 53 senior games, and 45 reserve games).
- 1972: Dandenong Football Club, 11 games.
- 1976–1977: Portland, captain-coach, 36 games.
- 1978–1979: Power House VAFA Football Club, captain-coach.
- 1980–1984: Old Geelong Grammarians VAFA Football Club, captain-coach.

=== Total ===
Including his time with Old Scotch Collegians, and his VAFA and VFL selection, he played a total of 281 games in his career (continuing to play until he was 40).

== Advertising ==
Whilst at Richmond, Mike worked for an advertising agency.

During this period, he created the slogan “Captain Morgan is good for your organ” for a Captain Morgan rum advertising campaign. The campaign received coverage in newspapers, radio, and television, and included a Moomba procession float featuring pirate-themed performers.

He later operated a photography business, and became involved with the Richmond Former Players' and Officials' Association.
