= Ron Stone =

Ron Stone may refer to:

- Ron Stone (American football) (born 1971), American football player
- Ron Stone (Australian footballer) (born 1945), Australian football player
- Ron Stone (baseball) (born 1942), Major League outfielder
- Ron Stone (bishop) (born 1938), Anglican bishop of Rockhampton
- Ron Stone (New Zealand footballer) (1913–2006), New Zealand international football (soccer) player
- Ron Stone (music industry executive) (born 1944), American personal manager and musician's advocate
- Ron Stone (reporter) (1936–2008), American television reporter
