= Bob Farmer =

Australian rules footballer (1947–2026)

Personal information
- Full name: Robert Boyd Farmer
- Born: 2 June 1947
- Died: 12 June 2026 (aged 79)
- Original team: Heidelberg H.S.
- Height: 183 cm (6 ft 0 in)
- Weight: 78 kg (172 lb)
- Position: Centre half forward

Playing career
Years	Club	Games (Goals)
1964–1969	Collingwood	56 (51)

Robert Boyd Farmer (2 June 1947 – 12 June 2026) was an Australian rules footballer who played for Collingwood in the Victorian Football League (VFL) during the 1960s.

A centre half forward, Farmer was aged just 16 years and 363 days when he made his senior VFL debut in 1964. He struggled to establish a place in the Collingwood team which made the finals in five of the six seasons that he was at the club, although he had a good season in 1968, kicking 22 goals and was chosen to represent Australia in the 'Galahs' World Tour that year.

The only final Farmer played was his final league game for Collingwood; the 1969 Preliminary Final loss to Richmond at the Melbourne Cricket Ground, where he kicked two goals. Farmer then accepted a lucrative offer from South Australian National Football League (SANFL) club West Adelaide, which included "a fully furnished flat, a good position with a cigarette company and a weekly match payment 'too good to refuse'".

Farmer died on 12 June 2026, at the age of 79.
