= Chris Mitchell (Australian footballer) =

Australian rules footballer (1947–2022)

Personal information
- Born: 1 January 1947
- Died: 26 November 2022 (aged 75); Geelong, Victoria, Australia
- Original team: Old Geelong Grammerians
- Height: 193 cm (6 ft 4 in)
- Weight: 87 kg (192 lb)
- Positions: Ruckman, forward

Playing career^{1}
Years	Club	Games (Goals)
1967–1968	Geelong	42 (32)
1969–1970	East Perth	15 (20)
1971	Geelong	4 (1)
1971	Carlton	5 (6)
Total		66 (59)
- ^{1} Playing statistics correct to the end of 1971.

Christopher Grant Mitchell (1 January 1947 – 26 November 2022) was an Australian rules footballer who played with Geelong and Carlton in the VFL.

Playing with the Old Geelong Grammarians, he was awarded the Best & Fairest Award in 1965, the same year he entered Trinity College (University of Melbourne) where he continued on the field, playing in Trinity's 1st XVIII football team.

An athletic, strong marking ruckman, Mitchell was handy around goals and kicked 23 of them in his debut season for Geelong in 1967. He would play in the 1967 VFL Grand Final, sharing ruck duties with Graham Farmer.

In 1969 he left Victoria and signed up with WANFL club East Perth where he spent two years before returning to Geelong. He represented Western Australia in a game at the 1969 Adelaide Carnival. His second stint at the Cats lasted just half a season and he finished the year at Carlton. It was against Geelong that he made his Carlton debut and he kicked a career high five goals.

Mitchell died on 26 November 2022.
