= Herb Matthews Sr. =

Australian rules footballer

Personal information
- Full name: Herbert Edward Matthews
- Born: 2 September 1894; St Andrews, Victoria
- Died: 2 June 1964 (aged 69); Cheltenham, Victoria
- Original team: North Melbourne (VFA)
- Height: 180 cm (5 ft 11 in)
- Weight: 89 kg (196 lb)
- Position: Ruckman

Playing career^{1}
Years	Club	Games (Goals)
1914	South Melbourne	1 (0)
1915	Richmond	3 (0)
1919–1922	Melbourne	50 (24)
1923–1924	South Melbourne	31 (27)
Total		85 (51)
- ^{1} Playing statistics correct to the end of 1924.

Herbert Edward Matthews (2 September 1894 – 2 June 1964) was an Australian rules footballer who played for South Melbourne, Richmond and Melbourne in the Victorian Football League (VFL).

After being part of North Melbourne's strong Victorian Football Association (VFA) combination, Matthews had a slow start to his VFL career. He made just one appearance in his debut season, at South Melbourne, which prompted him to cross to Richmond where he added only three more matches.

When the war ended he returned to league football again and lined up for Melbourne in the 1919 season, rucking regularly for them during his four years at the club. He made a return to South Melbourne in 1923, joining Roy Cazaly in the ruck and he played in a losing preliminary final.

In 1925, Matthews was appointed as captain/coach of Benalla in the Ovens & Murray Football League, but a week he later turned down the position.

His son, Herbie Matthews, later won a Brownlow Medal and his grandson of the same name also played with South Melbourne.
