= Roger Hoggett =

Australian rules footballer (1942–2019)

Personal information
- Full name: Roger Hoggett
- Born: 10 May 1942
- Died: 26 July 2019 (aged 77); Wonthaggi
- Original team: Longford
- Height: 178 cm (5 ft 10 in)
- Weight: 82.5 kg (182 lb)

Playing career^{1}
Years	Club	Games (Goals)
1964–65	Carlton	12 (0)
- ^{1} Playing statistics correct to the end of 1965.

Roger Hoggett (10 May 1942 – 26 July 2019) was an Australian rules footballer who played with Carlton in the Victorian Football League (VFL). After his VFL career, Roger played with the Western Suburbs Magpies AFC and finished third in the 1966 Phelan medal. He toured Ireland with the Australian Galahs in 1968.
