= 1971 Brownlow Medal =

- Winner: Ian Stewart (Richmond); 21 votes

Television/radio coverage
- Network: Seven Network

The 1971 Brownlow Medal was the 44th year the award was presented to the player adjudged the fairest and best player during the Victorian Football League (VFL) home and away season. Ian Stewart of the Richmond Football Club won the medal by polling twenty-one votes during the 1971 VFL season.

== Leading votegetters ==
	Player	Votes
1st	Ian Stewart (Richmond)	21
=2nd	Barry Davis (Essendon)	18
=2nd	Peter Hudson (Hawthorn)	18
=2nd	John McIntosh (St Kilda)	18
=5th	Alex Ruscuklic (Fitzroy)	16
=5th	Gary Dempsey (Footscray)	16
=5th	Bill Ryan (Geelong)	16
=5th	Ross Smith (St Kilda)	16
9th	Des Tuddenham (Collingwood)	15
10th	John Murphy (Fitzroy)	14
