= Alan Richardson (footballer, born 1940) =

Australian rules footballer (1940–2015)

Personal information
- Nickname: Bull
- Born: 19 November 1940
- Died: 17 March 2015 (aged 74)
- Original team: Casterton
- Height: 184 cm (6 ft 0 in)
- Weight: 95.5 kg (211 lb)

Playing career^{1}
Years	Club	Games (Goals)
1959–1969	Richmond	103 (30)
1969–1970	South Melbourne	7 (9)
Total		110 (39)
- ^{1} Playing statistics correct to the end of 1970.

Career highlights
- Richmond Premiership Player 1967; Richmond Reserves Best & Fairest 1963, 1964; Richmond Reserves Captain 1963, 1964

Alan Richardson, also known as Bull Richardson (19 November 1940 – 17 March 2015), was an Australian rules football player who played in the Victorian Football League between 1959 and 1969 for the Richmond Football Club and then from mid-1969 until 1970 for the South Melbourne Football Club.

== Family ==
Richardson's brother, Rodger, played 36 reserve matches and one senior game for Richmond; he transferred to VFA club Prahran in 1965. He played 37 games for Prahran (including playing in their 1966 premiership team). He played 70 games for Oakleigh Football Club (1968–1971), two seasons with Carnegie Football Club, and half a season with Cranbourne Football Club. He coached Clayton Juniors Football Club for 10 years (during which time the team won 3 premierships).

"Bull" married Colleen (née Patterson) in 1964 and had one child Tracey-Ann from this marriage. In 1972, he married his second wife Dianne (née Humphries), and had three children, Matthew, Samantha, and Andrew. Matthew played for Richmond until his retirement and was selected on the half forward flank of Richmond's "Team Of The Century". Alan has four grandchildren - Molly (Tracey-Ann), Gabriella and Andie (Samantha), Zoey (Matthew).

== Career ==
Recruited from Casterton Football Club in 1959, he was a strong and intelligent player, with exceptional ball sense and judgement, who worked hard and followed instructions. He played his first match for Richmond's senior side when just 18.

For some time he only played intermittently with the seniors — playing (at centre-half-back) in Richmond's 1962 Night Football premiership team (Richmond 8.16 (64) d. Hawthorn 9.6 (60)) — and, in 1963 and 1964, he was the captain of the Reserves side, winning the Reserves' best and fairest in both years.

He did not become a permanent senior player until 1965 (when he was 25); and did not play again in the Reserves until 1967, when he played a couple of matches before returning to the seniors. He played in the 1967 premiership team.

== Handball ==
Having been drilled in the importance of handball as a promoter of play-on football by the legendary coach and football analyst Len Smith, "Bull" found his calling as a ruck-rover under new coach Tom Hafey, who had replaced Jack Titus at Richmond in 1966.

Although strong, tenacious and persistent, "Bull" was an inconsistent and unreliable kicker, and was far from speedy.

It seemed a strategic masterstroke when Hafey encouraged "Bull" to play ruck-rover, and to rove to the rucks' hitouts (more often than not behind the ruck duel, rather than in front of it), rather than contesting the ball-ups and throw-ins with them, and to hand-pass the ball, rather than kick it, immediately he had it.

Anyone who saw "Bull" develop over 1966, and saw him flourish in 1967 — being Richmond's unchallenged best on the ground in the Grand Final, when he played his heart out with a superb display of ruck-roving and handball, until he was replaced early in the last quarter due to severe cramps after having more than 20 "possessions" — and seeing him lurking behind the pack, collecting the hitout, and then making one of his unique looping hand-passes could not fail to identify "Bull" as the glue that held the whole of Hafey's team together. In 1967 he played in Richmond's first grand final since the 1944 VFL season. Richmond went on to beat Geelong 16.18 (114) to 15.15 (105).

== After Richmond ==
Halfway through the 1969 season he was released to South Melbourne, and he continued to play with them until the end of 1970.

Following the end of his VFL career, Richardson moved to Tasmania to captain-coach the North West Football Union (NWFU) club East Devonport before temporarily returning to Victoria to captain coach the Irymple Football Club in 1974.

Richardson also served several terms as President of the East Devonport Football Club. He died in 2015, aged 74.

== Football record ==
- 1956-1958: Casterton Football Club, 54 games (126 goals)
- 1959-1964 and 1967-1969: Richmond Football Club Reserves, 92 games (41 goals), captain 1963, 1964, best and fairest 1963, 1964.
- 1959-1969: Richmond Football Club Seniors, 103 games (31 goals), member 1962 Night Football premiership team, 1967 VFL (Day) premiership team
- 1969-1970: South Melbourne Football Club Reserves, 11 games (9 goals)
- 1969-1970: South Melbourne Football Club Seniors, 11 games (21 goals)
- 1971-1973: East Devonport Football Club, captain-coach, 54 games (69 goals)
- 1974: Irymple Football Club, captain-coach, 19 games (36 goals)
