= Graeme Chalmers =

Australian rules footballer

Personal information
- Full name: Graeme Chalmers
- Born: 29 June 1944 (age 82); Yarraville
- Height: 178 cm (5 ft 10 in)
- Weight: 72 kg (159 lb)
- Position: Wingman

Playing career^{1}
Years	Club	Games (Goals)
1962–68	Footscray	75 (37)
- ^{1} Playing statistics correct to the end of 1968.

Graeme Chalmers (born 29 June 1944) is a former Australian rules footballer who played for Footscray in the Victorian Football League (VFL) during the 1960s.

Chalmers was used as a wingman by Footscray in his seven seasons. He kicked two goals on his league debut, at Western Oval, in a win over South Melbourne, to spoil Bob Skilton's 100th game. In 1967, Chalmers toured Ireland as part of the Australian Football World Tour.

He retired from football at just 23 to join the Royal Australian Air Force and served with the RAAF in Vietnam as an Iroquois Helicopter pilot. He subsequently had a long military flying career, including a tour with the Australian Army as a Chinook Helicopter instructor pilot.

He was past president of the No 9 Squadron RAAF Association.

- Graeme Chalmers's playing statistics from AFL Tables
- Holmesby, Russell and Main, Jim (2007). The Encyclopedia of AFL Foote: Bas PubAishing.
