= Dick Gill =

Australian rules footballer (1932–2020)

Personal information
- Full name: Richard Francis Gill
- Born: 11 January 1932
- Died: 6 September 2020 (aged 88)
- Height: 185 cm (6 ft 1 in)
- Weight: 85 kg (187 lb)

Playing career^{1}
Years	Club	Games (Goals)
1953	Carlton	8 (0)
- ^{1} Playing statistics correct to the end of 1953.

Richard Francis Gill (11 January 1932 – 6 September 2020) was an Australian rules footballer who played with Carlton in the Victorian Football League (VFL).
