= John Gill (footballer, born 1941) =

Australian rules footballer

Personal information
- Full name: John R. Gill
- Born: 26 October 1941 (age 85)
- Original team: Casterton
- Height: 182 cm (6 ft 0 in)
- Weight: 79 kg (174 lb)
- Position: Half-forward flank

Playing career^{1}
Years	Club	Games (Goals)
1962–1967	Carlton	88 (38)
- ^{1} Playing statistics correct to the end of 1967.

John R. Gill (born 26 October 1941) is a former Australian rules footballer who played with Carlton in the Victorian Football League (VFL) during the 1960s.

Gill was the third member of his extended family to play for Carlton, with his uncle Frank and brother Barry both having significant careers at the club.

A half forward flanker, Gill ended his first league season in 1962 with an appearance in a grand final, where Carlton lost to Essendon. He missed only three games in 1965 and 1966 but suffered a career-ending injury in 1967. In the first round of the season, against Fitzroy, Gill had kicked a career best three goals before he tore a knee cartilage and was taken off the ground. Although he returned to the team four rounds later, Gill re-injured his leg and had to retire.

He however continued to play at his former club, Casterton, in the Western Border Football League.
