= Ron Auchettl =

Australian rules footballer

Personal information
- Full name: Ronald Keith Auchettl
- Born: 4 August 1946
- Died: 2 December 2012 (aged 66)
- Original team: Merlynston
- Height: 184 cm (6 ft 0 in)
- Weight: 84 kg (185 lb)
- Position: Utility

Playing career^{1}
Years	Club	Games (Goals)
1966–69	Carlton	17 (8)
- ^{1} Playing statistics correct to the end of 1969.

Ronald Keith Auchettl (4 August 1946 – 2 December 2012) was an Australian rules footballer who played with Carlton in the Victorian Football League (VFL).
