= Colin Eales =

Australian rules footballer

Personal information
- Full name: Colin Eales
- Born: 3 July 1944 (age 82)
- Original team: Hamilton
- Height: 178 cm (5 ft 10 in)
- Weight: 75 kg (165 lb)

Playing career^{1}
Years	Club	Games (Goals)
1963–1969	Geelong	56 (24)
- ^{1} Playing statistics correct to the end of 1969.

Colin Eales (born 3 July 1944) is a former Australian rules footballer who played with Geelong in the Victorian Football League (VFL).

Eales spent much of his early years at Geelong in the seconds, after coming to the club from Hamilton. He was a member of Geelong's 1963 and 1964 reserves premierships. It wasn't until 1966 that he was regularly picked in the seniors, playing 18 of a possible 19 VFL games that year followed by all 21 in 1967. He often played as a wingman or rover, but was on a half forward flank in the 1967 VFL Grand Final, which Geelong lost to Richmond.

Once he left Geelong he went on to become a coach in country football. He had his first assignment at Stawell and was also senior coach of Cranbourne.
