= Scotch Old Collegians Football Club =

Scotch Old Collegians

Names
- Full name: Scotch Old Collegians Football Club

2024 D3 season
- Home-and-away season: 8th
- Leading goalkicker: Max Marslen (27)
- Best and fairest: Charlie Morgan

Club details
- Founded: 1929; 97 years ago
- Colours: blue gold
- Competition: South Australian Amateur
- Coach: Matthew Kluzek
- Captain: to be announced
- Ground: Prince of Wales Oval, Scotch College

Uniforms
Home	Away

Other information
- Official website: scotchoc.com.au/football

The Scotch Old Collegians Football Club (SOCFC) is an Australian rules football club located in Torrens Park, South Australia, playing in the South Australian Amateur Football League. The club is one of the sports sections of Scotch College, Adelaide and was formed in 1929 and it is the fifth-oldest club in the SAAFL.

Scotch fields three teams, one each in Division 3, Division 3 Reserves and C3. SOCFC draws its players from old collegians of Scotch College and from the local community. All teams train at Scotch College with the A and B grade teams also playing home matches there.

Apart from men's and women's football, the College has also sports sections for cricket, netball, rowing, and soccer.

== History ==
Scotch Old Collegians Football Club was formed in 1929. There have been around 225 different clubs that have participated in the South Australian Amateur Football League since its inception in 1911. Only Adelaide University (1911), Kenilworth (1914), Prince Alfred Old Collegians (1926) and St Peters Old Collegians (1928) have been in the SAAFL longer than Scotch OCFC. The club has produced 29 League medallists. Only two clubs, Adelaide University (68) and Broadview (29) have won more League medals than Scotch OCFC. Ian Harrison is the club’s only A1/D1 medallist. Multiple winners are Angus Irwin (3), Ian Harrison, Ash Manna, Scott Measday and Adam Williams (2).

== Premierships ==
A Grade: 1959, 1989, 1997, 2018

B Grade: 1970, 1971, 1986, 1997

C Grade: 1980, 1983, 2002, 2003, 2004, 2006

D Grade: 1991, 1992

== VFL/AFL players ==
- Jy Farrar (Gold Coast; 2020–present)
- Ash Johnson (Collingwood; 2021–2025)
- Shane McAdam (Adelaide; 2020–2023, Melbourne; 2024–present)
