= Barry Gill =

Australian rules footballer and coach

Personal information
- Born: 21 January 1945 (age 81)
- Original team: Casterton
- Debut: Round 2, 19656784, Carlton vs. Hawthorn, at Glenferrie Oval
- Height: 184 cm (6 ft 0 in)
- Weight: 85 kg (187 lb)

Playing career^{1}
Years	Club	Games (Goals)
1964–1972	Carlton	132 (5)
1973-1974	Williamstown	16 (10)
Total		148 (15)
- ^{1} Playing statistics correct to the end of 1972.

Career highlights
- VFL Premiership player: (1968, 1970)

Barry Gill (born 21 January 1945) is a former Australian rules footballer who played for the Carlton Football Club in the Victorian Football League (VFL).

A member of one of Carlton's famous footballing families, Gill was regarded as a dependable, no-frills defender who was part of two premiership teams for the Blues. He is the younger brother of John Gill, nephew of Frank Gill and cousin of Dick Gill, all of whom also played for Carlton at senior VFL level.

Gill carried his good form from 1969 into 1970, playing every game until Round 21 against Footscray at Princes Park, when he was replaced at three-quarter time after sustaining a slight thigh muscle strain. Carlton decided to rest Gill for the final home-and-away round in order for him to recover for the Second Semi-final against Collingwood. In a thrilling match which would serve as a prelude to the Grand final, Collingwood prevailed by ten points. Gill was considered one of Carlton's best afield.

Gill was a defender and usually played in a back pocket and later in his career moving to centre half back. A member of Carlton's 1968 and 1970 premiership sides, Gill left the club after the 1972 season, and served as captain-coach of Williamstown in the VFA from 1973 until 1974.
