= Gareth Andrews =

Australian rules footballer

Personal information
- Full name: Gareth Eliot Tremayne Andrews
- Born: 21 December 1946 (age 79)
- Original team: Geelong College
- Height: 191 cm (6 ft 3 in)
- Weight: 90 kg (198 lb)

Playing career^{1}
Years	Club	Games (Goals)
1965–1974	Geelong	136 (127)
1974–1975	Richmond	31 (1)
Total		167 (128)
- ^{1} Playing statistics correct to the end of 1975.

Career highlights
- VFL premiership player: 1974

Gareth Andrews (born 21 December 1946) is a former Australian rules footballer who played for Geelong and Richmond in the Victorian Football League (VFL), now the Australian Football League (AFL).

Andrews attended Geelong College; and, as a schoolboy, he had a strong mark but awkward kicking style. He had a good debut season at the Cats, kicking the winning goal in his first game and topping their goal-kicking for the year with 35 goals. He spent most of the season at full-forward due to an injury to Doug Wade and it would be the only time from 1961 to 1972 that someone other than Wade topped Geelong's goal-kicking.

When Wade returned, Andrews was shifted to centre half-forward, moving to ruck-rover and then centre half-back later in his career. Andrews consistently played finals football whilst with Geelong and the closest he got to a premiership with the Geelong Cats was when he was a member of their 1967 Grand Final side which went down to his future club Richmond by nine points.

Andrews didn't play at all in 1971 as he travelled overseas. After he returned he played two and a half more seasons with Geelong before crossing to Richmond during 1974. This allowed him to finally play in a premiership, being a member of Richmond's 1974 Grand Final winning team.

Andrews was joint Founder of the VFL Players Association (now the AFLPA) in the early-1970s and became its second president.

Following his playing career, Andrews stayed in AFL Football, firstly as Football Manager and then CEO of the Richmond Football Club in 1978 to early-1979. He then worked on ABC Radio and Television from 1980-1989 inclusive, including a period as host of the ABC National TV Program The Winners in 1986. Andrews became "The Analyst" for The Sunday Age from 1990–1998 inclusive, a specialist Football writing role with occasional other articles.

In late 1998 Andrews was elected to the Geelong Football Club Board, led by Frank Costa. These were turbulent times for the Club and in his capacity as vice president during that period, has watched the Geelong Cats become a dominant force in AFL Football with three Premierships in 2007, 2009 and 2011.

Andrews is a Life Member of the AFL, AFLPA and the Geelong Cats.

After leaving Geelong College, Andrews commenced a Commerce Degree at Melbourne University in 1965, the same year he began his VFL Football career. Upon completion of his degree, Andrews joined the Sales and Marketing Team of Alcoa Aluminum.

Andrews left Alcoa in 1971, and following his travels, commenced a career in real estate. In 1975, his final year in VFL football, Andrews launched Andrews & Moore Real Estate in Richmond, Melbourne. Andrews & Moore quickly became a leading inner-city residential Agency. Andrews maintained his interest in Andrews & Moore when he became CEO of the Richmond Football Club, but soon developed new interests in the health and fitness industry.

From 1980–1986, Andrews and his business partner created Activetics Pty. Ltd. a company which established health and fitness programs for companies throughout Australia. When Andrews sold his interest to HBA, he created 'The Fitness Generation'. The Fitness Generation subsequently became a major importer/distributor of fitness equipment.

After selling his interests in Andrews & Moore and the Fitness Generation, Andrews returned to the property industry as a consultant. In 1990 Andrews established Andrews Corporation and over time specialised in the sales, marketing and management of residential inner-city apartments to both local and overseas investors. In early 2010, Andrews partly sold his real estate interests to Dingle Partners, and remains a director and shareholder.

In 2011, Andrews established LifeAgain Pty. Ltd., a Company with the stated aim of inspiring and connecting men during times of change.
