= Dennis Munari =

Australian rules footballer and coach (1948–2023)

Personal information
- Full name: Dennis Michael Munari
- Born: 18 April 1948
- Died: 2 February 2023 (aged 74)
- Original team: Assumption College
- Debut: Round 8, 1967, Carlton vs. Geelong, at Princes Park
- Height: 178 cm (5 ft 10 in)
- Weight: 76 kg (168 lb)

Playing career^{1}
Years	Club	Games (Goals)
1967–1970	Carlton	41 (20)
1974–1977	North Melbourne	13 (1)
Total		54 (21)
- ^{1} Playing statistics correct to the end of 1977.

Dennis Michael Munari (18 April 1948 – 2 February 2023) was an Australian rules footballer who played with Carlton and North Melbourne in the VFL.

Munari joined Carlton in 1967 from Assumption College and was the second rover to Adrian Gallagher in Carlton's premiership side the following season. From 1971 to 1973 he spent time as playing coach at Hobart and had a stint at VFA club Preston before returning to the VFL in 1974, at North Melbourne. Despite being with North for four seasons he managed just 13 games.

Munari died on 2 February 2023, at the age of 74.
