= Rodger Richardson =

Australian rules footballer

Personal information
- Full name: Rodger Richardson
- Born: 12 June 1943
- Original team: Casterton
- Height: 188 cm (6 ft 2 in)
- Weight: 86 kg (190 lb)

Playing career^{1}
Years	Club	Games (Goals)
1964	Richmond	1 (0)
- ^{1} Playing statistics correct to the end of 1964.

Rodger Richardson (born 12 June 1943) is a former Australian rules footballer who played with Richmond in the Victorian Football League (VFL).
