= Bill Barrot =

Australian rules footballer and coach

- Barrot during his Richmond career

Personal information
- Full name: William Thomas Barrot
- Nickname: Bustling Billy
- Born: 6 May 1944; Victoria
- Died: 29 November 2016 (aged 72)
- Original team: Ashburton
- Height: 180 cm (5 ft 11 in)
- Weight: 81.5 kg (180 lb)
- Position: Midfielder

Playing career^{1}
Years	Club	Games (Goals)
1961–1970	Richmond	120 (91)
1971	St Kilda	2 (4)
1971	Carlton	12 (10)
1972, 1974	Oakleigh	17 (28)
1973-1974	West Torrens	12 (8)
Total		163 (141)
- ^{1} Playing statistics correct to the end of 1971.

Career highlights
- Richmond Premiership Player 1967, 1969; Richmond Best and Fairest 1965; Interstate Games – 11; Richmond – Team of the Century; Richmond – Hall of Fame – inducted 2007

William Thomas Barrot (6 May 1944 – 29 November 2016) was a professional Australian rules football player who played in the Victorian Football League (VFL), the South Australian Football League (SANFL) and the Victorian Football Association (VFA).

== Family ==
The son of Wesley Thomas Barrot (1917–1978), and Peggy Eileen Barrot (1923–2016), née French, William Thomas Barrot was born at Melbourne on 6 May 1944.

His brother Wes Barrot, a professional sprinter who also played VFL football with Richmond and with Collingwood.

== Football ==
Barrot made his senior VFL in 1961 for Richmond Football Club, where he was known with popular affection as Bustling Billy. Playing as a centreman, Barrot won the Jack Dyer Medal (Richmond's best-and-fairest award) in 1965, was an interstate representative for Victoria, and a major driving force behind the Tigers' 1967 grand final win. However, Barrot was prone to injury, which limited his senior VFL appearances for the Tigers to just 120 over ten seasons, although he did get a second premiership with Richmond in 1969. A personal highlight for the year, besides winning the premiership, was a career-best 8-goal haul against Carlton; at the time, Richmond's 24.12.156 was the highest team score Carlton had ever conceded, although Carlton only lost by 29 points.

In 1971, Barrot was sensationally traded to St Kilda in exchange for two-time Brownlow Medallist Ian Stewart, who would end up winning the 1971 Brownlow Medal with Richmond for his record-tying third medal; sports writer Greg Hobbs claimed Barrot was being offered $10,000 (equivalent to $122,699 in 2022) for a two-year contract (plus bonuses), a very good salary for the time. However, Barrot never truly settled at Moorabbin Oval, managing just a couple of games, and later in the year he was traded to Carlton Football Club, where he finished his VFL career.

In 1972, Barrot played for VFA side Oakleigh, which had endured a lean time for more than a decade. Barrot's impact, both on and off the field, was immediate and pronounced, and the Devils won the first-division grand final.

Moving to Adelaide, Barrot was appointed as captain-coach of SANFL club West Torrens. After running seventh in 1973, the Eagles endured a horror start to the 1974 season which ultimately precipitated Barrot's departure, in somewhat acrimonious circumstances, midway through the year. However, it was during this 1.5-year stint at West Torrens that Barrot would be remembered for his 87-metre torpedo punt goal.

He finished his career back at Oakleigh, where he took over as coach. Barrot coached Frankston FC in the VFA, under his former teammate at Richmond FC, Mike Patterson. He coached Frankston reserves to a drawn Grand Final against Preston. Years later, whilst playing in a Richmond legends game, Barrot suffered a heart attack and almost died on the field.

== Death ==
Barrot died on 29 November 2016 aged 72.

== See also ==
- Australian Football World Tour
