= Leo Francis =

Australian rules footballer

Personal information
- Full name: Leo Francis
- Born: 4 December 1922
- Died: 13 December 2003 (aged 81)
- Original team: Bendigo CYMS
- Height: 169 cm (5 ft 7 in)
- Weight: 74 kg (163 lb)

Playing career^{1}
Years	Club	Games (Goals)
1945–1951	North Melbourne	78 (11)
- ^{1} Playing statistics correct to the end of 1951.

Leo Francis (4 December 1922 – 13 December 2003) was an Australian rules footballer who played with North Melbourne in the Victorian Football League (VFL).

Francis came to North Melbourne from Bendigo CYMS. In 1945, his debut season, Francis was a member of the North Melbourne team which contested the VFL finals for the first time in their history. A wingman, Francis missed the 1950 VFL Grand Final with a knee injury.

Later in the 1950s he was captain-coach of Sandhurst in the Bendigo Football League.

He was the uncle of Peter Francis, who played for four VFL clubs.
