= Herb Matthews Jr. =

Australian rules footballer

Personal information
- Full name: Herbert J. Matthews Jr.
- Born: 10 May 1943 (age 83)
- Original team: Melbourne U19s
- Height: 169 cm (5 ft 7 in)
- Weight: 77 kg (170 lb)
- Position: Defender

Playing career^{1}
| Years | Club | Games (Goals) |
| 1961–64 | Melbourne | 20 (8) |
| 1964–69 | South Melbourne | 82 (22) |
| Total | | 102 (30) |
- ^{1} Playing statistics correct to the end of 1969.

Herb Matthews Jr. (born 10 May 1943) is a former Australian rules footballer who played for Melbourne and South Melbourne in the Victorian Football League (VFL) during the 1960s.

Matthews, the son of Brownlow Medal winner Herbie, started his career at Melbourne, a club he had been with from under-age level. He left Melbourne midway into the 1964 season, a decision which may have cost him a premiership as the Demons went on to win that year's Grand Final. Instead he spent the next six years at South Melbourne, as a defender. He travelled to Ireland in 1967 as part of the Australian Football World Tour, where he represented the VFL.
