= Wes Barrot =

Australian rules footballer

Personal information
- Born: 8 October 1953 (age 73)
- Original team: Mount Waverley
- Height: 179 cm (5 ft 10 in)
- Weight: 77.5 kg (171 lb)

Playing career^{1}
Years	Club	Games (Goals)
1973–74	Richmond	3 (0)
1975	Collingwood	1 (0)
Total		4 (0)
- ^{1} Playing statistics correct to the end of 1975.

Wes Barrot (born 8 October 1953) is a former Australian rules footballer who played with Richmond and Collingwood in the Victorian Football League (VFL).
