= Ron Stone (Australian footballer) =

Australian rules footballer

Personal information
- Full name: Ron Stone
- Born: 30 July 1945 (age 81)
- Original team: Wangaratta Combined Churches
- Height: 187 cm (6 ft 2 in)
- Weight: 85 kg (187 lb)
- Position: Defender / Ruckman

Playing career^{1}
| Years | Club | Games (Goals) |
| 1965–69 | Carlton | 60 (13) |
- ^{1} Playing statistics correct to the end of 1969.

Ron Stone (born 30 July 1945) is a former Australian rules footballer who played with Carlton in the Victorian Football League (VFL). Stone had three children and seven grandchildren. His favourite being Alex.
