= Len Smith (footballer, born 1912) =

Australian rules footballer and coach

Personal information
- Full name: Leonard Victor Smith
- Born: 9 February 1912; Fitzroy North, Victoria
- Died: 23 July 1967 (aged 55); Coburg, Victoria
- Original team: Northcote (VFA)
- Height: 180 cm (5 ft 11 in)
- Weight: 74.5 kg (164 lb)

Playing career^{1}
| Years | Club | Games (Goals) |
| 1931–1937 | Northcote | 72 (59) |
| 1934–1935 | Melbourne | 19 (3) |
| 1937–1945 | Fitzroy | 76 (52) |
| Total | | 167 (114) |

Coaching career
| Years | Club | Games (W–L–D) |
| 1958–1962 | Fitzroy | 92 (50–40–2) |
| 1964–1965 | Richmond | 15 (3–12–0) |
| Total | | 107 (53–52–2) |
- ^{1} Playing statistics correct to the end of 1945.

Career highlights
- Victorian coach 1961

Leonard Victor Smith (9 February 1912 – 23 July 1967) was an Australian rules footballer who played for the Melbourne Football Club and Fitzroy Football Club in the Victorian Football League (VFL).

The older brother of champion full-forward and coach Norm Smith, Len Smith was considered one of the pioneers of modern Australian rules football. Although his actual coaching career was short-lived due to struggles with ill health, his emphasis on speed, constructive handpassing and play on had particular influence on Ron Barassi and Tom Hafey.

Smith was also a noted cricketer who played for the Dennis Cricket Club.

== Early years ==
Leonard Victor Smith was the eldest son of Victor Smith and Ethel May and grew up in Northcote, Victoria.

== Playing career ==
In 1930, he was playing with Croxton in the Band of Hope competition, and in the following year trained with the Northcote but spent the year playing in the seconds in the VJFA. He was awarded trophy for the best and fairest player the V.J.F.A. In his first year in the senior side, his form was good enough to play in the representative VFA team that played the VFL. Smith would wow the crowds with his spectacular high marks at centre half forward. In 1933, he was second in the Recorder Cup losing to Charlie Stanbridge by one vote.

Smith left Northcote and the VFA for Melbourne in the Victorian Football League (VFL) in 1934. He spent two seasons with the club before he returned to Northcote for the 1936 season. Fitzroy was interested in him and he played there from 1937 to 1943. Due to service during World War II with the Royal Australian Air Force (RAAF), he missed the 1944 season altogether but returned for a final year in 1945.

== Coaching ==
Like his younger brother, the legendary Norm Smith, it is as a coach that Len is best remembered. During his first stint as a coach, of the Fitzroy Under-19s (1948–1957), he guided the side to the 1955 Premiership. His first senior coaching role was with Fitzroy, taking them to the finals in 1958 and 1960. He was appointed the Victoria state coach for 1961. He then coached Coburg in the Victorian Football Association (VFA) for the 1963 season before heading to Richmond. He suffered a heart attack in 1964 and further health concerns saw him relinquish the coaching reins at the Tigers early in 1965. Smith died of a second heart attack in 1967.

Coach Ron Barassi described Smith as the "father of modern football", noting that he was the first coach in Victoria to encourage and popularise the attacking use of handball in an era when stop–start play and long kicking were more common.

== Bibliography ==
- Hogan P: The Tigers of Old, Richmond FC, Melbourne 1996
