= Ken Newland =

Australian rules footballer (1949–2025)

Personal information
- Born: 4 May 1949
- Died: 24 January 2025 (aged 75)
- Original team: Warrnambool Tech
- Height: 187 cm (6 ft 2 in)
- Weight: 85 kg (187 lb)

Playing career^{1}
Years	Club	Games (Goals)
1965–1975	Geelong	183 (227)
1976	Footscray	18 (12)
1977–1978	Geelong	15 (16)
Total		216 (255)
- ^{1} Playing statistics correct to the end of 1978.

Ken Newland (4 May 1949 – 24 January 2025) was an Australian rules footballer who played with the Geelong Football Club in the VFL. He was just 21 years of age when he played his 100th league game. Only Tim Watson and Garry Young have reached that milestone at a younger age.

Newland died on 24 January 2025, at the age of 75.
