= John Northey =

Australian rules footballer and coach (born 1943)

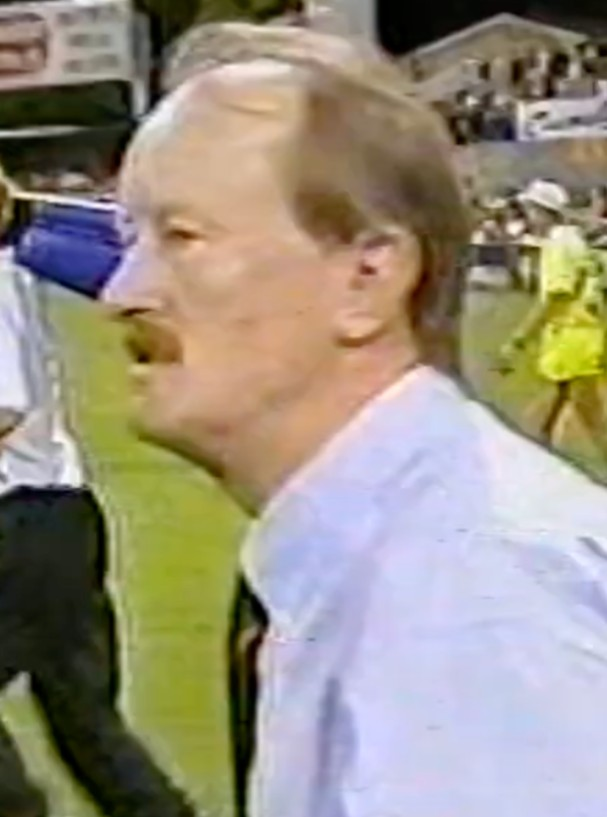
- Northey coaching Brisbane in 1996

Personal information
- Full name: John Neville Northey
- Nickname: Swooper
- Born: 29 June 1943 (age 83)
- Original team: Derrinallum
- Height: 175 cm (5 ft 9 in)
- Weight: 69 kg (152 lb)
- Position: Half forward flank

Playing career^{1}
| Years | Club | Games (Goals) |
| 1963–1970 | Richmond | 118 (192) |

Coaching career
| Years | Club | Games (W–L–D) |
| 1985 | Sydney Swans | 22 (6–16–0) |
| 1986–1992 | Melbourne | 167 (90–76–1) |
| 1993–1995 | Richmond | 67 (32–34–1) |
| 1996 | Brisbane Bears | 25 (17–7–1) |
| 1997–1998 | Brisbane Lions | 34 (12–21–1) |
| Total | | 315 (157–154–4) |
- ^{1} Playing statistics correct to the end of 1998.

Career highlights
- VFL/AFL Premiership player: (1967), (1969)

John Neville Northey (born 29 June 1943) is a former Australian rules football player and coach. He played from 1963 to 1970 with the Richmond Football Club. Northey was a dual premiership player with Richmond, winning flags in 1967 and 1969. He is better known, however, as a coach.

== Playing career ==
=== Richmond ===
A Derrinallum recruit, the lightly framed Northey was a fleetfooted runner and earned the "swooper" nickname by his ability to get the ball and pass it on to a teammate. He played 118 games and kicked 192 goals for Richmond from 1963 until 1970. He also was a member of Richmond's 1967 and 1969 premiership teams.

== Coaching career ==
Northey left Richmond and moved to Sydney as player/coach at Western Suburbs in the Sydney Football League. He coached NSW against a VFL Reserves team in 1972 and then Redan to five BFL premierships between 1975 and 1980. He was serving as an assistant coach with St Kilda under Mike Patterson.

=== Sydney Swans senior coach (1985) ===
He was appointed as senior coach with the Sydney Swans for one season in 1985 where he was sacked after a year when he didn't fit into flamboyant owner Geoffrey Edelsten's vision of a higher profile coach. He was replaced by Tom Hafey.

=== Melbourne Football Club senior coach (1986–1992) ===
He then went to be the senior coach of Melbourne from 1986 to 1992; his most successful year was when he took the Demons to the 1988 VFL Grand Final, eventually losing to Hawthorn. After the 1992 season, he decided to leave the Melbourne Football Club and step down as senior coach after struggling to finish 11th and therefore missing out of the finals. Northey was then replaced by Neil Balme as Melbourne Football Club senior coach.

=== Richmond Football Club senior coach (1993–1995) ===
From 1993 to 1995, he went to be the senior coach at his former club, Richmond. His first two seasons at Richmond were unsuccessful but in the 1995 season they finished 3rd putting them into the finals, but were eliminated by eventual runners-up Geelong in the preliminary final. However, after the 1995 season, he resigned as Richmond Football Club senior coach. Northey was then replaced by Robert Walls as Richmond Football Club senior coach.

=== Brisbane Bears senior coach (1996) ===
He was then appointed Brisbane Bears senior coach for the 1996 season, when he replaced Robert Walls. Northey led the Bears to their best ever season in making the preliminary final, before being eliminated by eventual premiers North Melbourne.

=== Brisbane Lions senior coach (1997–1998) ===
After the 1996 season, the Brisbane Bears merged with the Fitzroy Lions resulting on the formation of the Brisbane Lions. He was then appointed as the inaugural senior coach of the Brisbane Lions for the 1997 season. Northey led the club into the finals in their inaugural season in 1997, where they finished eighth with ten wins, eleven losses and one draw. The Lions under Northey were then eliminated by eventual runners-up St Kilda in the first week of the qualifying finals. However, after disappointing results in the 1998 season, when the Lions under Northey sat last on the ladder, he was sacked after the Lions suffered a 71-point loss to Fremantle in Round 11, 1998. He was then replaced by assistant coach Roger Merrett as caretaker senior coach for the rest of the 1998 season.

=== Overall total coaching record ===
He coached 315 VFL/AFL games including stints at Sydney Swans, Brisbane Lions, Melbourne Demons, Richmond Tigers and Brisbane Bears. He sits third on the record for the most VFL/AFL games coached without a premiership behind Rodney Eade (377) and Ross Lyon (354).

== Post AFL career ==
At the end of his AFL coaching career, Northey returned to Ballarat, where he was the figurehead to the rebuilding of local BFL side Redan, the club had fallen onto hard times and as a past coach of the club he was asked to help.

He was awarded the Australian Sports Medal by Queen Elizabeth II on 24 October 2000 for his contributions to Australian football.

He went on to coach South Fremantle Football Club for the 2002 and 2003 seasons in the WAFL.

Northey returned to Ballarat, he coached the Ballarat Swans from 2005 and to a premiership in 2008. He is the coach of the Learmonth Football Club.

He also operates his own website at http://www.swoopercoach.com.au that offers his expert advice on coaching, drills and his own blog.

His nephew is the conductor Benjamin Northey.
