= Neville Crowe =

Australian rules footballer

- Crowe fundraising during the 1990 Save Our Skins campaign

Personal information
- Born: 1 June 1937
- Died: 2 September 2016 (aged 79)
- Original team: State Savings Bank
- Height: 193 cm (6 ft 4 in)
- Weight: 95.5 kg (211 lb)

Playing career^{1}
Years	Club	Games (Goals)
1957–1967	Richmond	150 (84)
- ^{1} Playing statistics correct to the end of 1967.

Career highlights
- Richmond captain 1963-1966; 3x Richmond Best & Fairest: 1963, 1964, 1966; Interstate Games:- 9; All-Australian team 1966; Richmond Hall of Fame inductee 2002

Neville Crowe (1 June 1937 – 2 September 2016) was an Australian rules footballer who represented Richmond in the Victorian Football League (VFL) during the 1950s and 1960s. He also served as club president from 1987 to 1993, and was at the forefront of the Save Our Skins campaign in 1990, which saved the club from financial ruin.

In the 1967 Second Semi-final, Crowe was reported for allegedly striking Carlton ruckman John Nicholls, and suspended. He subsequently missed Richmond's drought-breaking premiership victory in the 1967 VFL Grand Final, and announced his retirement shortly afterward. Crowe's "phantom punch" is regarded as one of the most unlucky moments in VFL/AFL history.

Crowe retired at the end of 2008 from working at the club, finally ending his involvement that had extended to over 50 years.

In September 2012, it was reported that Crowe had been out riding his bicycle when he suddenly lost control and careered into the Yarra River. A passing jogger, John Greene, who happened to be a lifelong Tigers supporter, dived into the muddy river and pulled Crowe to safety with the help of other passers-by who formed a human chain to get him to the embankment.

== Bibliography ==
- Hogan P: The Tigers Of Old, Richmond FC, Melbourne 1996
