= Graham Burgin =

Australian rules footballer

Personal information
- Born: 4 April 1948 (age 78)
- Original team: Vermont Juniors
- Debut: Round 8, 1965, Richmond vs. Fitzroy
- Height: 187 cm (6 ft 2 in)
- Weight: 85.5 kg (188 lb)

Playing career^{1}
Years	Club	Games (Goals)
1965–1971	Richmond	60 (0)
- ^{1} Playing statistics correct to the end of 1971.

Career highlights
- Richmond Premiership Player 1967, 1969; Richmond Reserves Premiership Player 1966

Graham Burgin (born 4 April 1948) is a former Australian rules football player who played in the VFL between 1965 and 1971 for the Richmond Football Club.
