= Roger Dean (footballer) =

Australian rules footballer, born 1940

Personal information
- Full name: Roger Edward Dean
- Born: 30 April 1940 (age 86); Richmond, Victoria
- Original team: Richmond Scouts
- Height: 175 cm (5 ft 9 in)
- Weight: 73 kg (161 lb)

Playing career^{1}
Years	Club	Games (Goals)
1957–1973	Richmond	245 (204)

Representative team honours
Years	Team	Games (Goals)
1962–1964	Victoria	4
- ^{1} Playing statistics correct to the end of 1980.

Career highlights
- Michael Roach Medal, 1964; Richmond captain, 1968–1971; Richmond premiership player, 1967, 1969; Richmond premiership captain, 1969; Richmond life member, 1964; Richmond Team of the Century, 1998; Richmond Hall of Fame, 2002 – Immortal, 2019

Roger Edward Dean (born 30 April 1940) is a former Australian rules footballer who played in the VFL between 1957 and 1973 for the Richmond Football Club. Dean was one of the last elite Australian footballers born and bred in the local suburb for which he played. After the fastest rise of any player in VFL/AFL history, Dean's career bridged two eras with the Tigers: the battling years when the club farewelled their old Punt Road Oval, and the beginning of their glory days which began with a move to the Melbourne Cricket Ground.

== Early days ==
Dean started playing the game seriously while studying at Swinburne Technical School, and so determined was he to play in the VFL with Richmond, he eschewed all other sports. After leaving school, Dean joined junior team Richmond Scouts for two years, before trying out with Richmond's fourths team in 1956. The following year, aged 17, Dean completed the most meteoric rise in the history of elite Australian football. Commencing the year in the fourths, Dean was quickly promoted to the thirds (under 19s) to play half a season under ex-Melbourne premiership player Len Dockett. Impressed with Dean's potential, Dockett recommended the youngster for promotion to the reserves team. As Richmond was having a poor finish to the season and were out of contention to play in the finals, the club's selectors decided to blood Dean in the final game of the season against the league leaders Melbourne, at the MCG. Although a number of players have completed the rise from the thirds to the senior team in one year, no player ever matched Dean's feat of coming from the fourths. (nb. during the AFL era, the under 19 competition was abolished in 1991 and the reserves disbanded after the 1999 season).

Despite its record-breaking beginning, Dean's career was slow to take off; he wasn't a team regular until 1961. The following season, he affirmed his improvement by winning selection for Victoria for the first time. A neat, skilful and determined player who could mark well for a small man, Dean was versatile enough to play in defence or attack and occasionally rove. Although he had good goal sense, Dean played his best football in defence where his steadiness and courage stood out in an era noted for its defensive style of play.

== The Barassi incident ==
Dean's best remembered attribute is his "acting" ability. Whenever he sensed an opportunity to stage for a free kick, Dean was not averse to diving on the ground or melodramatically throwing his body around, as if the victim of an illegal tackle. This style of play often earned the ire of opposition supporters, but Dean was one of the most loved players among the Tiger fans.

Dean's antics led to one of the most famous incidents in the game's history. On 31 August 1963, two weeks before the finals were due to start, the Tigers played the dominant Melbourne team at Richmond's Punt Road Oval. Dean clashed with Ron Barassi in an incident noticed by the umpire, who subsequently reported Barassi for striking Dean. As the most influential player in the game, Barassi was the key to his team's chances in the finals. The consensus was that Dean staged the incident. Melbourne officials attempted to introduce to the case a videotape of the game taken by the television cameras, to demonstrate Barassi's innocence. The tribunal refused to accept the tape and suspended Barassi, a decision that may have cost Melbourne the 1963 premiership. Ironically, during the modern era, videotape is integral to the majority of cases brought before the tribunal, but was not utilised by the game's authorities until 1973.

== A new era ==
At this point in Dean's career, the publicity generated by the Barassi case equalled any that Richmond received for its playing performances - the club was the competition's chopping block. In the six years since Dean's debut, the Tigers had managed just 18 wins from 108 games. However, an ambitious plan to move Richmond's home games to the neighbouring Melbourne Cricket Ground, overhaul the administration and spend big money on a recruiting campaign, really got underway in 1964. Dean was one of a group of experienced senior players who provided a nucleus around which the club could build its team. He was in outstanding form as the team dramatically climbed the ladder, finishing in fifth place in both 1965 and 1966.

Richmond then made the quantum leap to the top of the ladder in 1967. During a high-pressure finals series, Dean provided much-needed leadership and steadiness to a team that contained not a single player with finals experience. Playing in the back pocket, Dean was one of the Tigers' best in a semi final win over Carlton. In the Grand Final, Dean gathered seventeen possessions and took a courageous mark in the dying minutes of the game, slamming into a point post as he hung grimly to the ball. His shrewd play negated the influence of the brilliant Geelong rovers when they rested in the forward pocket. Richmond's first premiership since 1943 was celebrated with great gusto in the inner-Melbourne suburb; the triumph was close to home for Dean, one of the few players in the team who had grown up in the streets of Richmond. He completed his best ever season with a second placing in the club's best and fairest award.

== Dogged skipper ==
Dean's excellent finals performances helped win him the position of club captain the following year, following the retirement of Freddy Swift. A plumber for all of his working life, Dean epitomised the blue collar, tough-as-teak image that the Richmond club liked to project. For the remainder of Dean's career, he was used in a variety of positions - he handed the back pocket position to another plumber with a similar reputation, Kevin Sheedy.

The Tigers disappointed by missing the finals in his first year at the helm but made amends in 1969 when, aged 29, Dean achieved captaining the premiership side. In front of a record 119,165 people, Richmond achieved victory after coming from fourth place (before the finals) to defeat Carlton in Grand Final, Dean playing well on a forward flank. During the presentation ceremony, Dean received the cup with John Nicholls next to him. Dean held the trophy aloft and then ruffled his hand through the hair of Nicholls.

Dean led Richmond into the finals for a second time in 1971, a season when he became the seventh player to pass two hundred games in yellow and black. After the year ended in a defeat to St Kilda in the preliminary final, Dean handed the club captaincy to the brilliant young Tasmanian, Royce Hart.

== Fitting farewell ==
Now the veteran of the team, Dean held his place during 1972, often playing up forward. However, disaster struck when he broke a leg on the eve of the finals and missed playing in the Grand Final when Richmond crashed to defeat after starting as one of the hottest premiership favourites ever. He found it difficult to get back to form the following year and played less than half the games during the regular season. Dean was included in the team for the semi-final win over St Kilda, but he then lost his place and when it came time to pick the Tigers' Grand Final team, it was clear he would miss out due to age and form. As compensation, he was offered the captaincy of the reserves team, also playing in the Grand Final.

On 29 September 1973, the Richmond club was aiming for history with all four of its teams in line for a premiership. After the two junior teams were victorious, Dean led the reserves against Geelong in the curtain-raiser before the main game. He went out on a high, captaining the team to victory and was chaired off by his teammates in front of a crowd that was building up to 116 000. The senior team then won the flag to duly complete a clean sweep, an achievement unimaginable when Dean had joined the club as teenager. It was the end of an era in another way – Dean was the last player to have played a senior game at the club's Punt Road Oval.

Dean's retirement was absolute. He didn't play or coach at a lower level as most ex-league players do, instead opting to play competitive tennis. He remains one of the most popular players to have played for the club. A fitting tribute to Roger Dean was given by Graeme Richmond: "Pound for pound he is the best player in my time at the club."

== After football ==
In 1998 Dean was named on a half-forward flank in the Richmond Team of the Century. He was an inaugural inductee into the Richmond Hall of Fame in 2002, where in 2019 he was elevated to 'Immortal' status.

== Sources ==
- 1971 Tiger Year Book - Richmond Football Club
- Tiger Dean from the school of hard knocks - Richmond Tigers Official Site
- Hogan P: The Tigers Of Old, Richmond FC, Melbourne 1996
