= Bill Ryan (footballer, born 1944) =

Australian rules footballer

Personal information
- Full name: William Ronald Ryan
- Born: 26 November 1944 (age 81)
- Original team: Swan Hill
- Height: 188 cm (6 ft 2 in)
- Weight: 87 kg (192 lb)
- Positions: Ruckman, centre half-forward

Playing career^{1}
| Years | Club | Games (Goals) |
| 1963–1972 | Geelong | 167 (220) |

Representative team honours
| Years | Team | Games (Goals) |
| 1971 | Victoria | 1 |
| | Queensland | 6 |
- ^{1} Playing statistics correct to the end of 1972.

William Ronald Ryan (born 26 November 1944) is a former Australian rules footballer who played with Geelong in the Victorian Football League (VFL).

== Football ==
Ryan, who was recruited from Swan Hill, could play as a ruckman, centre half back and key position forward.

On 6 July 1963 he was a member of the Geelong team that were comprehensively and unexpectedly beaten by Fitzroy, 9.13 (67) to 3.13 (31) in the 1963 Miracle Match.

He participated in the 1967 Grand Final but his side lost and he never played in another. A strong mark off the ball, he finished equal fifth in the 1971 Brownlow Medal count. The same year he kicked a career best 67 goals, with eight of them coming against Footscray at Kardinia Park.

He is often remembered for a match-winning goal he kicked after the siren against Collingwood at his home ground in the 1967 season. With Geelong down by five points he took a mark 15 metres out, but as Ryan was noted for his wayward kicking at goal it was no certainty. His shot was by smothered Collingwood's Terry Waters but he had another opportunity when the umpire decided that Waters had run over the mark.

Ryan finished his football career in Queensland, playing for both Coorparoo and Southport during the 1970s. Most successful at Southport, he appeared in a total of five premiership sides. In both 1974 and 1975, he captained the Queensland interstate team and once kicked five goals in a win over Tasmania. He is a member of the Queensland Football Hall of Fame.

== See also ==
- 1963 Miracle Match
