= Billy Brown (Australian footballer) =

Australian rules footballer

Personal information
- Born: 9 October 1942 (age 84)
- Original team: Malvern Combined/State Savings Bank
- Height: 171 cm (5 ft 7 in)
- Weight: 63 kg (139 lb)

Playing career^{1}
Years	Club	Games (Goals)
1963–1971	Richmond	130 (124)
- ^{1} Playing statistics correct to the end of 1971.

Career highlights
- Richmond premiership player 1967, 1969; Interstate games: 4

William Brown (born 9 October 1942) is a former Australian rules football player who played in the Victorian Football League (VFL) between 1963 and 1971 for the Richmond Football Club.
