= John Ronaldson =

Australian rules footballer (1946–2026)

Personal information
- Full name: John Robert Ronaldson
- Born: 1 October 1946
- Died: 19 June 2026 (aged 79)
- Original team: East Malvern Juniors
- Height: 196 cm (6 ft 5 in)
- Weight: 102 kg (225 lb)

Playing career
Years	Club	Games (Goals)
1965–1970	Richmond	59 (33)

Career highlights
- Richmond Premiership Player 1967, 1969

John Robert Ronaldson (1 October 1946 – 19 June 2026) was an Australian rules football player who played in the VFL between 1965 and 1970 for the Richmond Football Club.

Ronaldson died from cancer on 19 June 2026, at the age of 79. He was the father of Australian basketball player Tony Ronaldson.

== Sources ==
- Hogan P: The Tigers Of Old, Richmond FC, Melbourne 1996
