= Yan Yean railway station =

Former railway station in Victoria, Australia

Coordinates: 37°34′14.3″S 145°6′25″E

Yan Yean
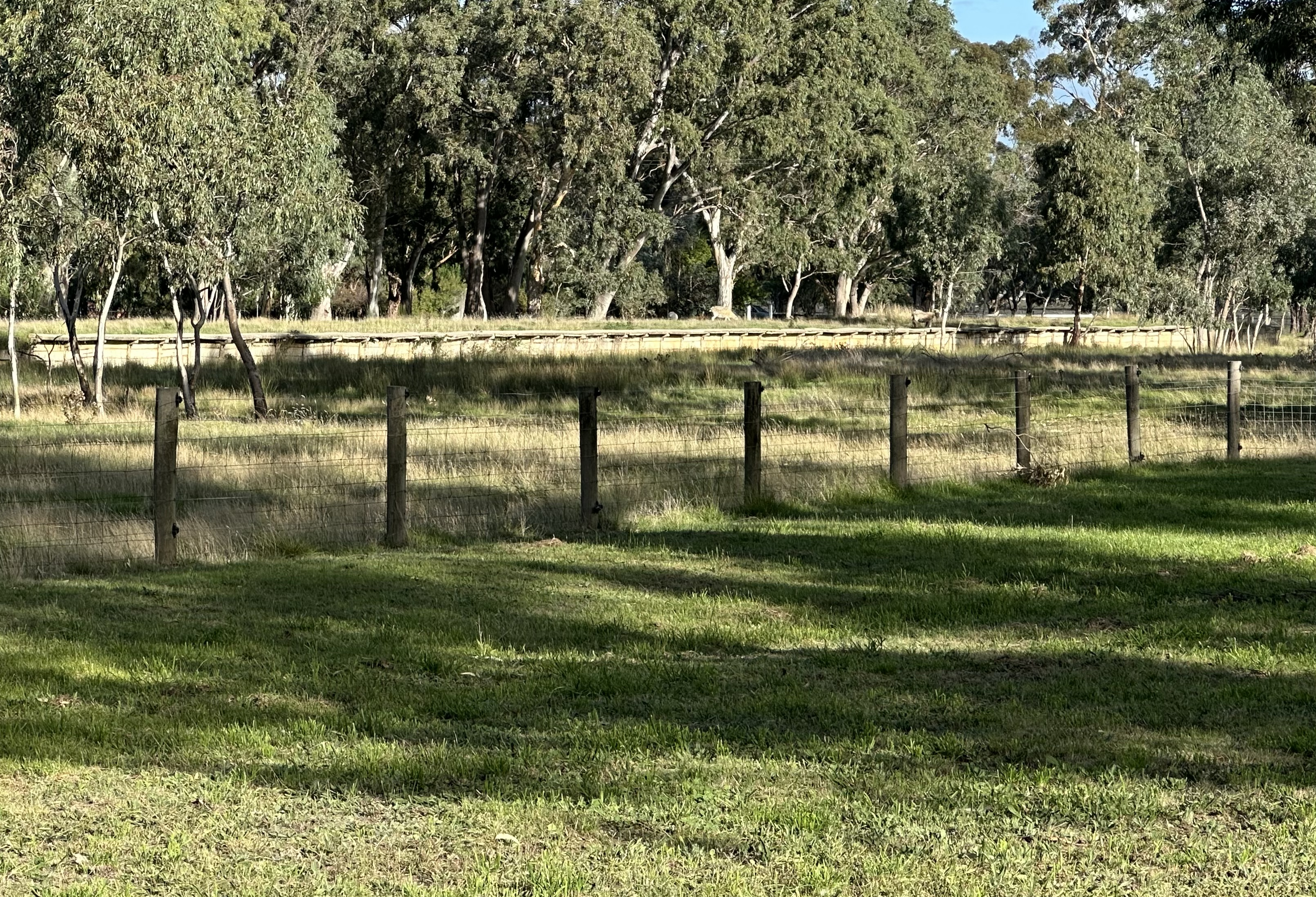
- Remains of the station platform in April 2026

General information
- Line: Whittlesea
- Platforms: 1
- Tracks: 1

Other information
- Status: Closed

History
- Opened: 23 December 1889
- Closed: 29 November 1959

Services
| Preceding station | VicRail | Following station |
|---|---|---|
| Mernda towards Thomastown | Whittlesea line | Whittlesea Terminus |
List of closed railway stations in Melbourne
Location

Yan Yean was a steam-era railway station on the Whittlesea line in Yan Yean, Victoria, Australia. It is now located on private property.

== History ==
Yan Yean station opened in 1889 and operated until the closure of the line beyon Lalor in 1959, after the electrification of the line to Lalor. Epping station was then re-opened in the 1960s with the reopening and electrification of that section of the line. The remaining section of track from Epping to Whittlesea was then dismantled in the 1970s, with the former right-of-way remaining almost intact. In 2012, the line was reinstated to South Morang, which was followed by the reinstatement of the line to Mernda in 2018.

A small siding used by milk trains also was operated from 1926 to 1945.
