= South Morang railway station =

Railway station in Melbourne, Australia

South Morang
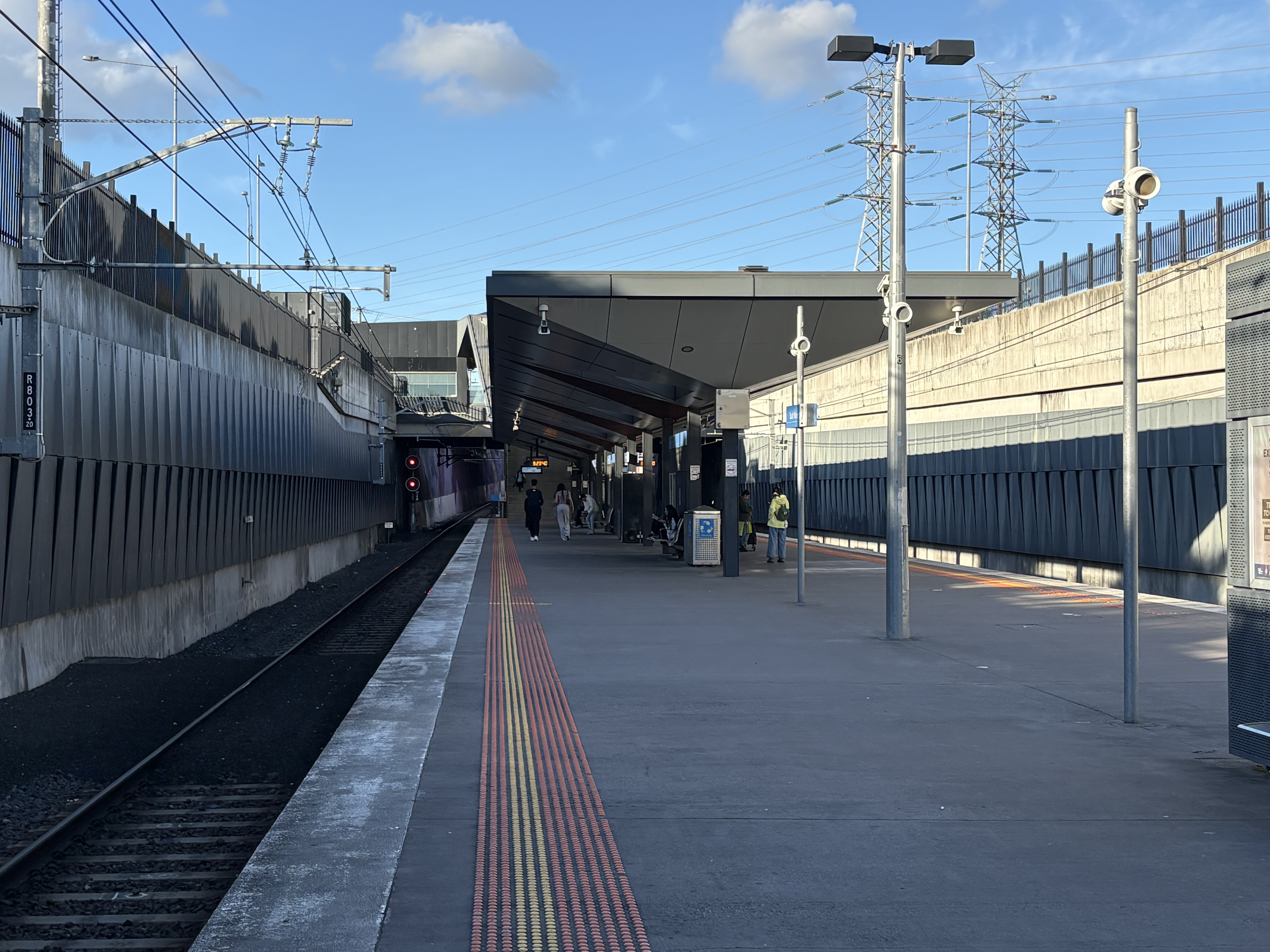
- Northeast bound view from Platform 2 June 2026

General information
- Location: McDonalds Road, South Morang, Victoria 3752; City of Whittlesea; Australia
- Coordinates: 37°38′57″S 145°4′3″E
- System: PTV commuter rail station
- Owner: VicTrack
- Operator: Metro Trains
- Line: Mernda
- Distance: 25.99 kilometres from Southern Cross
- Platforms: 2 (1 island)
- Tracks: 2
- Connections: Bus

Construction
- Structure type: Below ground
- Parking: 450
- Cycle facilities: Yes
- Accessible: Yes—step free access

Other information
- Status: Operational, premium station
- Station code: SMG
- Fare zone: Myki zone 2
- Website: Public Transport Victoria

History
- Opened: 22 April 2012; 14 years ago
- Electrified: November 2011 (1500 V DC overhead)
- Former names: Stopping Place No. 39 (1925–1959)

Passengers
- 2011–2012: 141,142
- 2012–2013: Not measured
- 2013–2014: 929,186 ▲558.3%
- 2014–2015: 1,004,019 ▲8.05%
- 2015–2016: 1,174,152 ▲16.94%
- 2016–2017: 1,170,111 ▼0.34%
- 2017–2018: 1,266,871 ▲8.27%
- 2018–2019: 886,550 ▼30%
- 2019–2020: 554,250 ▼37.5%
- 2020–2021: 291,000 ▼47.5%
- 2021–2022: 347,300 ▲19.34%
- 2022–2023: 510,050 ▲46.86%

Services
Preceding station	Metro Trains	Following station
Epping towards Flinders Street	Mernda line	Middle Gorge towards Mernda
Track layout
Location

South Morang station is a railway station operated by Metro Trains Melbourne on the Mernda line, which is part of the Melbourne rail network. It serves the north-eastern suburb of South Morang, in Melbourne, Victoria, Australia, and is located adjacent to Westfield Plenty Valley. South Morang is a below ground premium station, featuring an island platform with two faces. It opened on 22 April 2012.

== History ==
The first passenger facility at the site was Rail Motor Stopping Place (RMSP) No. 39, which was opened in May 1925 at the McDonalds Road level crossing on the former Whittlesea line. The then South Morang station was a short distance further on. In its final years of operation, the passenger service was provided by a diesel electric railmotor (DERM).

On 29 November 1959, the Victorian Railways closed the line north of Lalor, following the electrification of the line from Reservoir to Lalor. The line to Epping was electrified and re-opened on 29 November 1964, and the remaining section of track from Epping to Whittlesea dismantled, although the former right-of-way was left intact.

Following the election of the Bracks Government in October 1999, a promise was made to restore the rail service to South Morang by 2003. In 2004, it was decided a bus service would be introduced instead and, in May 2006, the original promise of restoring the railway was delayed until 2021. As a result of continued community pressure by the South Morang Rail Alliance, a coalition of community groups in the area, then Premier, John Brumby, announced in 2008 that construction of the extension would be brought forward to 2010, as part of the Victorian Transport Plan.

The Epping line was extended to the site of Rail Motor Stopping Place No. 39, on the border of South Morang and Mill Park, about two kilometres short of the original South Morang station. On 22 April 2012, the new station was opened to the public. As part of the extension project, five kilometres of track was duplicated between Keon Park and Epping, a second platform built at Thomastown, and a grade separation project at Epping included the construction of a new station there.

Provision was for the new line to be extended further northwards to Mernda and, on 26 August 2018, that extension opened.

== Platforms and services ==
South Morang has one island platform with two faces. It is served by Mernda line trains.

South Morang platform arrangement
Platform	Line	Destination	Service Type	Source
1	Mernda line	Flinders Street	All stations and limited express services	
2	Mernda line	Mernda	All stations	

== Transport links ==
Kinetic Melbourne operates eight bus routes via South Morang station, under contract to Transport Victoria:

- 382 : Whittlesea – Northland Shopping Centre
- 383 : Mill Park Lakes Palisades Estate – University Hill
- 386 : Mernda station – RMIT University Bundoora campus
- 387 : Mernda station – RMIT University Bundoora campus
- 564 : to RMIT University Bundoora campus
- 569 : to Pacific Epping
- 577 : to Pacific Epping
- SmartBus 901 : Frankston station – Melbourne Airport

== Gallery ==
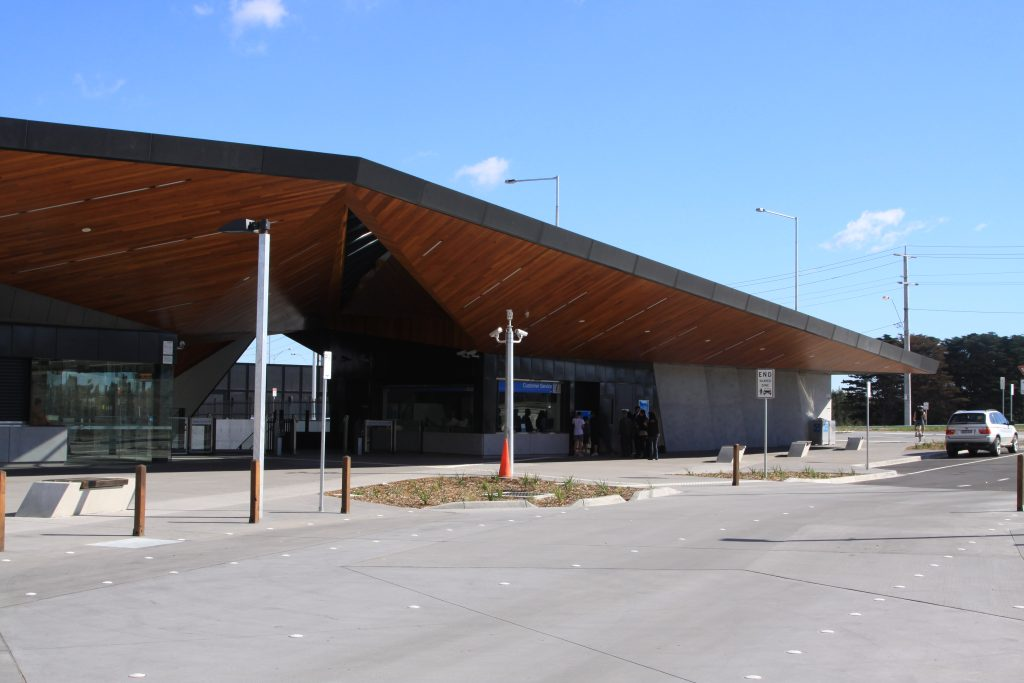
Station building and entrance, April 2012

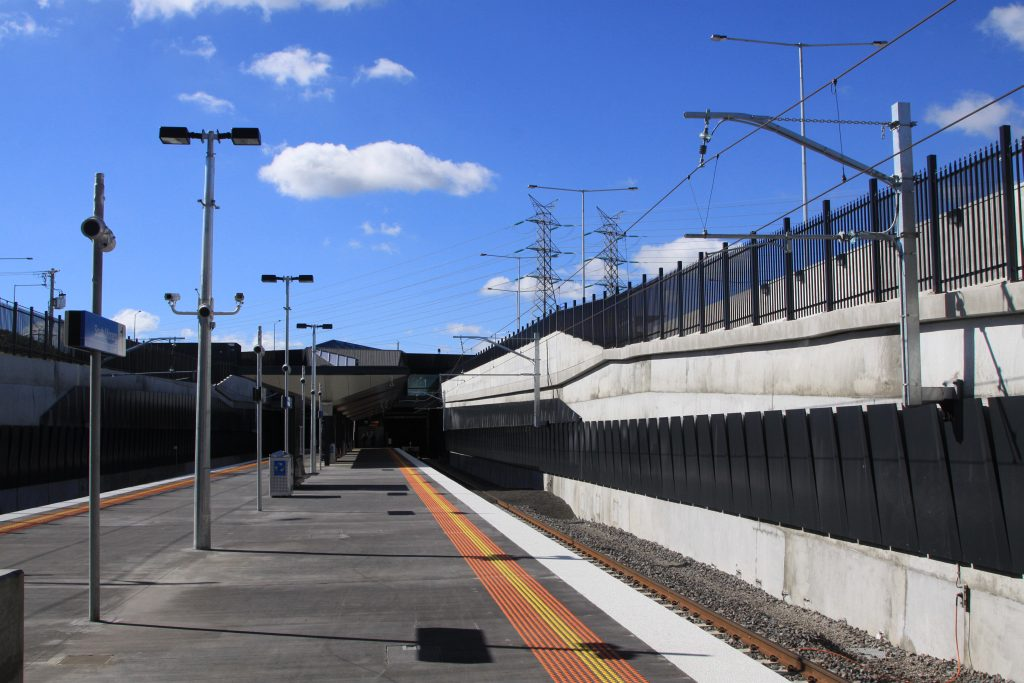
Eastbound view from Platform 1, April 2012
