= Whittlesea railway line =

Former railway line in Melbourne, Australia

Whittlesea

Overview
- Status: Operational with passenger services from Flinders Street to Mernda; Dismantled beyond Mernda
- Owner: Victorian Railways (VR) (1889–1974); VR as VicRail (1974–1983); MTA (The Met) (1983–1989); PTC (The Met) (1989–1997); VicTrack (1997–Current)
- Locale: Melbourne, Victoria, Australia
- Termini: Flinders Street; Whittlesea
- Connecting lines: All metropolitan, regional, and interstate
- Former connections: Inner Circle
- Stations: 29 current stations; 11 former stations

Service
- Services: Mernda

History
- Work began: 8 October 1888
- Opened: Flinders Street to Princes Bridge on 18 December 1865; Collingwood to Inner Circle South Junction on 8 May 1888; Inner Circle North Junction to Reservoir on 8 October 1889; Reservoir to Whittlesea on 23 December 1889; Princes Bridge to Collingwood on 21 October 1901; Rushall to Merri on 5 December 1904
- Completed: 5 December 1904
- Reopened: Lalor to Epping on 29 November 1964; Epping to South Morang on 27 November 2011; South Morang to Mernda on 2 July 2018
- Electrified: Princes Bridge to Reservoir on 31 July 1921; Reservoir to Thomastown on 16 December 1929; Thomastown to Lalor on 30 November 1959; Lalor to Epping on 30 November 1964; Epping to South Morang on 27 November 2011; South Morang to Mernda on 2 July 2018
- Closed: Lalor to Whittlesea on 29 November 1959

Technical
- Line length: 41.468 km (25.77 mi)
- Number of tracks: Double track
- Track gauge: 1,600 mm (5 ft 3 in)
- Electrification: 1500 V DC overhead
- Operating speed: 80 km/h (50 mph) – Electric
- Signalling: Automatic block signalling
- Maximum incline: 1 in 40 (2.5%)

The Whittlesea railway line is a former railway line operating in Melbourne, Victoria, Australia. The line was opened in 1889, with part of the line now the modern day Mernda line.

== History ==
The beginnings of the Whittlesea line occurred during its opening on 8 October 1889, as part of railway extensions into the northern suburbs. What became known as the Inner Circle line was opened from Spencer Street station (now Southern Cross station) via Royal Park station, to a station called Collingwood (now called Victoria Park), and then on to Heidelberg. The Epping line branched off at Fitzroy North to Preston Reservoir station (later renamed Reservoir) in 1889, with the line extended to Whittlesea a few months later, on 23 December.

Trains on the line operated via Fitzroy and the Inner Circle, until the opening of the current connection between Victoria Park and Princes Bridge stations in 1901. Passenger services were operated in two tiers: a local train to Preston Reservoir station via Clifton Hill, and a country mixed train to Whittlesea, via Fitzroy. The Epping line was electrified to Reservoir in 1921, with an AEC railmotor providing a shuttle service between Reservoir and the terminus at Whittlesea. Preston Reservoir station was renamed Reservoir in 1909.

The line had a number of Rail Motor Stopping Places (RMSP) along the line, these being a mere nameboard beside the railway line at a convenient public access point. The first were RMSP 8, 9 and 10, which opened in May 1927; followed by Epping Quarries Siding RMSP in January 1928, which originally opened as just a siding in 1925 and later became RMSP 34 on 28 February 1933; RMSP 17 in March 1928; RMSP 26 in January 1930; RMSP 33 on 25 July 1932; RMSP 39 in July 1941; and RMSP 77 on 29 September 1947, which was renamed Lalor station in 1952. The remaining numbered RMSPs (8, 9, 10, 17, 26, 33, 34, and 39) were all closed on 29 November 1959 with the closure of the line past Lalor station. Direct Whittlesea trains from Spencer Street were withdrawn on 3 July 1948.

Electrification was extended along 4.4 kilometres (2.7 mi) of single track to Thomastown in 1929, paid for by a land developer, who paid for the works, as well as guaranteeing against operating losses. Keon Park station was opened at the same time, but the Whittlesea shuttle train continued to connect with suburban trains at Reservoir, until 1931. From this time, a double-ended Leyland railmotor was provided, and connections made at Thomastown. Goods trains to Whittlesea were withdrawn in 1955, and goods trains from Epping ended in 1958.

Electric suburban services were extended to Lalor station in November 1959, in addition to duplication of the line from Reservoir to Keon Park, with services beyond this point to Whittlesea replaced by bus service, and the line closed. The line to Epping was reopened and electrified in 1964, with the remaining line dismantled in the 1970s. However, the right-of way was retained, which allowed for the re-extension and electrification of the line to South Morang in 2012, and again to Mernda in 2018.

The right-of way beyond Mernda is also still in place, and is retained for a future railway extension.

== Station histories ==
| Station | Opened | Closed | Age | Notes |
|---|---|---|---|---|
| Flinders Street | 12 September 1854 | | 172 years | Formerly Melbourne Terminus |
| Princes Bridge | 8 February 1859 | 1 October 1866 | 7 years | |
| Princes Bridge | 2 April 1879 | 30 June 1980 | 101 years | |
| Jolimont | 21 October 1901 | | 125 years | |
| West Richmond | 21 October 1901 | | 125 years | |
| North Richmond | 21 October 1901 | | 125 years | |
| Collingwood | 21 October 1901 | | 125 years | Formerly Collingwood Town Hall |
| Victoria Park | 8 May 1888 | | 138 years | Formerly Collingwood |
| Clifton Hill | 8 May 1888 | | 138 years | |
| Rushall | 1 January 1927 | | 99 years | |
| Merri | 8 October 1889 | | 137 years | Formerly Northcote |
| Northcote | 8 October 1889 | | 137 years | Formerly Middle Northcote |
| Croxton | 8 October 1889 | | 137 years | |
| Thornbury | 8 October 1889 | | 137 years | |
| Bell | 8 October 1889 | | 137 years | Formerly Preston – Bell Street |
| Preston | 8 October 1889 | | 137 years | Formerly Preston – Murray Road; Formerly Murray |
| Regent | 8 October 1889 | | 137 years | Formerly Preston – Regent Street |
| Reservoir | 8 October 1889 | | 137 years | Formerly Preston – Reservoir |
| Ruthven | 5 August 1963 | | 63 years | |
| Keon Park | 16 December 1929 | | 96 years | Formerly Keonpark |
| Thomastown | 23 December 1889 | | 136 years | |
| RMSP No.8 (2nd) | c. 13 March 1928 | 29 November 1959 | Approx. 31 years | Approx. near Mann's Crossing |
| Lalor | 29 September 1947 | 28 November 1959 | 12 years | Formerly RMSP No.77 |
| Lalor | 30 November 1959 | | 66 years | |
| RMSP No.8 (1st) | c. 10 May 1927 | c. 13 March 1928 | Approx. 10 months | Approx. near Childs Road |
| Epping | 23 December 1889 | 28 November 1959 | 69 years | 1st site |
| Epping | 30 November 1964 | 24 November 2011 | 46 years | 2nd site |
| Epping | 28 November 2011 | | 14 years | 3rd site |
| RMSP No.34 | 12 May 1925 | 29 November 1959 | 34 years | Formerly Epping Quarries Siding |
| South Morang | 22 April 2012 | | 14 years | |
| RMSP No.39 | c. 1 July 1941 | 29 November 1959 | Approx. 18 years | Approx. near McDonald's Road |
| Middle Gorge | 23 December 1889 | 28 November 1959 | 69 years | Was originally South Morang |
| Middle Gorge | 26 August 2018 | | 8 years | Known as Marymede during construction Reopened as Middle Gorge |
| RMSP No.33 | 25 July 1932 | 29 November 1959 | 27 years | Approx. near Plenty Road |
| Hawkstowe | 26 August 2018 | | 8 years | |
| RMSP No.9 | c. 10 May 1927 | 29 November 1959 | Approx. 32 years | Approx. near Hawkstowe Parade |
| Mernda | 23 December 1889 | 28 November 1959 | 69 years | Formerly South Yan Yean |
| Mernda | 28 June 2018 | | 8 years | |
| RMSP No.26 | c. 21 January 1930 | 29 November 1959 | Approx. 29 years | Approx. near Masons Road |
| Yan Yean | 23 December 1889 | 29 November 1959 | 69 years | |
| RMSP No.10 | c. 17 May 1927 | 29 November 1959 | Approx. 32 years | Approx. near Reservoir Road |
| RMSP No.17 | c. 13 March 1928 | 29 November 1959 | Approx. 31 years | Approx. near Cades Road |
| Whittlesea | 23 December 1889 | 29 November 1959 | 69 years | |

== See also ==
- Mernda railway line
