= Reservoir railway station =

Railway station in Melbourne, Australia

Reservoir
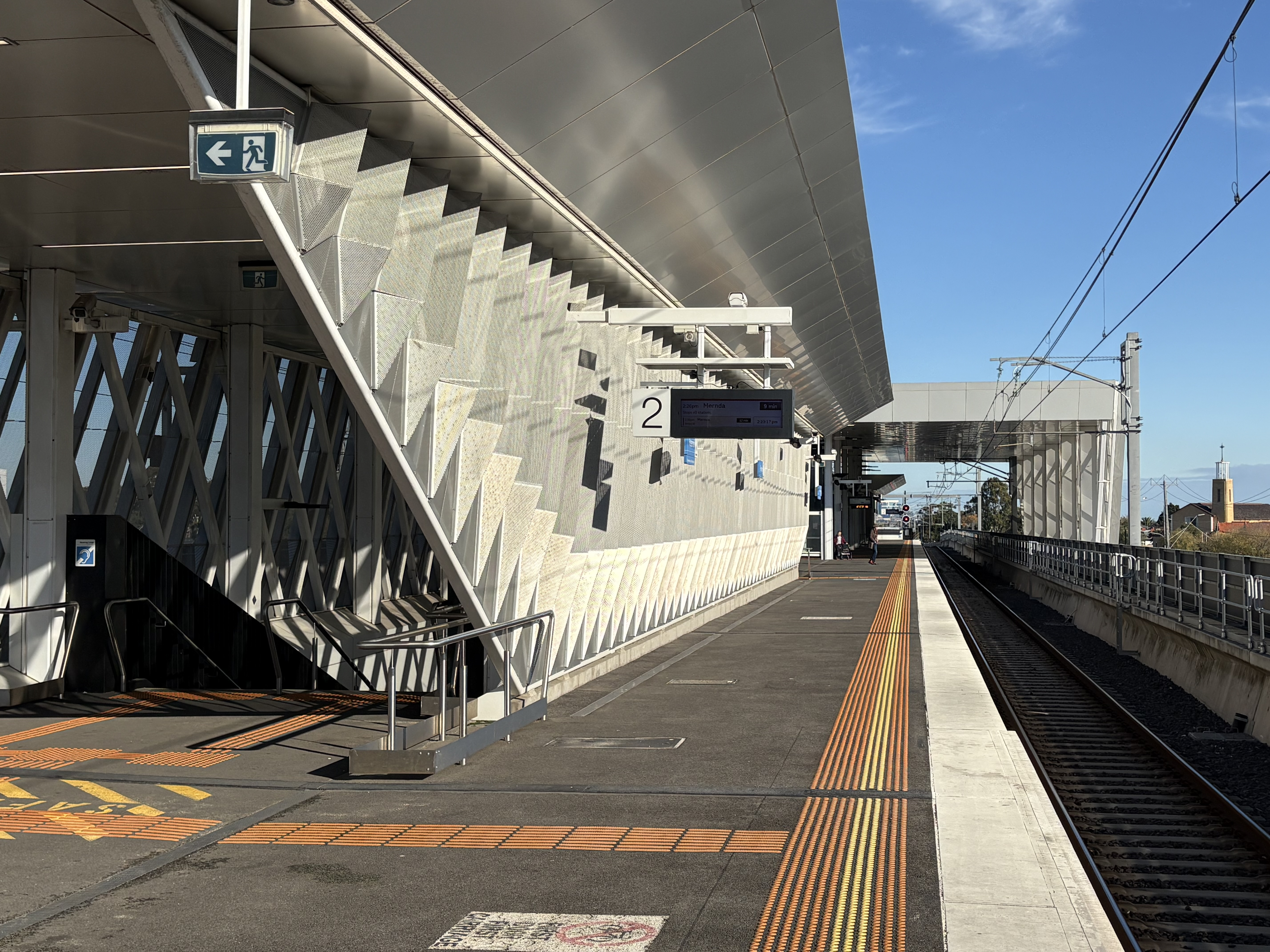
- Southbound view from Platform 2, June 2026

General information
- Location: High Street, Reservoir, Victoria 3073; City of Darebin; Australia
- Coordinates: 37°43′00″S 145°00′26″E
- System: PTV commuter rail station
- Owner: VicTrack
- Operator: Metro Trains
- Line: Mernda
- Distance: 14.94 kilometres from Southern Cross
- Platforms: 2 (1 island)
- Tracks: 2
- Connections: Bus

Construction
- Structure type: Elevated
- Parking: 380
- Cycle facilities: Yes
- Accessible: Yes—step free access

Other information
- Status: Operational, premium station
- Station code: RES
- Fare zone: Myki zone 1/2
- Website: Public Transport Victoria

History
- Opened: 8 October 1889; 137 years ago
- Rebuilt: 1967; 16 December 2019 (LXRP)
- Electrified: July 1921 (1500 V DC overhead)
- Former names: Preston – Reservoir (1889–1909)

Passengers
- 2005–2006: 850,907
- 2006–2007: 931,894 ▲9.51%
- 2007–2008: 1,072,476 ▲15.08%
- 2008–2009: 1,236,817 ▲15.32%
- 2009–2010: 1,316,708 ▲6.45%
- 2010–2011: 1,272,669 ▼3.34%
- 2011–2012: 1,157,335 ▼9.06%
- 2012–2013: Not measured
- 2013–2014: 1,181,322 ▲2.07%
- 2014–2015: 1,099,944 ▼6.88%
- 2015–2016: 1,103,946 ▲0.36%
- 2016–2017: 1,108,520 ▲0.41%
- 2017–2018: 1,121,719 ▲1.19%
- 2018–2019: 959,063 ▼14.5%
- 2019–2020: 517,550 ▼46.03%
- 2020–2021: 349,200 ▼32.52%
- 2021–2022: 473,200 ▲35.51%
- 2022–2023: 672,750 ▲42.17%

Services
Preceding station	Metro Trains	Following station
Regent towards Flinders Street	Mernda line	Ruthven towards Mernda
Track layout
Location

Reservoir station is a railway station operated by Metro Trains Melbourne on the Mernda line, which is part of the Melbourne rail network. It serves the north-eastern suburb of Reservoir, in Melbourne, Victoria, Australia. Reservoir is an elevated premium station, featuring an island platform with two faces. It opened on 8 October 1889, with the current station provided in December 2019.

Initially opened as Preston-Reservoir, the station was given its current name of Reservoir on 1 December 1909.

== History ==
Reservoir station opened when the Inner Circle line was extended from North Fitzroy station. On 23 December of the same year, the line was further extended to Epping. Like the suburb, the station was named after the three reservoirs that were built south-east of the station, in 1864, 1909 and 1913 respectively. The reservoirs were constructed to hold Melbourne's water supply from the Yan Yean Reservoir.

The station was originally the terminus for suburban services on the Whittlesea line. The line was duplicated in December 1910 and, in July 1921, Reservoir became the terminus for suburban electric trains. In 1924, an eighth-metre-long turntable was provided at the station, to turn the AEC railmotor which operated between Reservoir and Whittlesea, making two trips a day. In December 1929, electric train services were extended from Reservoir to Thomastown and, in 1940, the turntable was abolished.

In 1959, duplication of the line to Keonpark station was provided. In 1963, manually operated boom barriers replaced hand-operated gates at the former High Street level crossing, which was at the down end of the station. In 1967, the former ground-level station buildings were provided, replacing the original structures.

In the early hours of 13 July 1975, a deliberately-lit fire damaged Harris motor 567M and Tait motor 345M, both of which were stabled at the station. On 29 December 1980, Harris backing trailer 533BT, which was in a consist operating the 23:15 down service to Epping, was damaged by fire as it arrived at the station.

On 18 December 1986, a number of sidings and signals were abolished. On 1 April 1987, further sidings were abolished. On 8 May 1988, the former signal box and interlocked frame were abolished. Also abolished were two crossovers at the up and down ends of the station, as well as the double line block signalling system between Reservoir and Keon Park, which was replaced with automatic three-position signalling. Pedestrian gates were also installed at the former station pedestrian crossing, which was at the down end, and at the former High Street level crossing. Two months earlier, the double line block system between Bell and Reservoir had been abolished.

In 1991, a reconfigured High Street level crossing was opened, with that arrangement existing until the grade separation of the level crossing in 2019. On 25 June 1996, Reservoir was upgraded to a premium station.

In January 2016, the Level Crossing Removal Authority announced that the High Street level crossing would be removed by grade separation. In September 2018, preliminary designs were released, showing that the grade separation would be achieved by elevating the railway, with a new station to be built at the existing location. The winning station design was produced by local architecture firm Genton. Plans for grade separation have dated as far back as the early to mid 1970s.

On 2 December 2019, the ground-level station was closed for demolition, and the new station, above a multi-road intersection, was opened on 16 December of that year. As part of the work, crossovers were reinstated at both the up and down ends of the new station.

The new station was designed by architecture firm Genton, with landscaping by McGregor Coxall. It features an elevated rail corridor with a translucent canopy and angled metal facade inspired by the ripple effect of water, reflecting Reservoir’s historical role as a water infrastructure hub.

The design reconnects Edwardes Street and Broadway via a new civic plaza, improves pedestrian safety and access, and includes space for future tram and bus interchange expansion. The station received multiple awards, including the Special Prize Exterior at the 2021 Prix Versailles and the Sustainability Award at the Australasian Rail Industry Awards. It was also shortlisted in the 2021 Victorian Architecture Awards. Reservoir Station is the first train station in Australia to achieve a 5-star Green Star As-Built rating from the Green Building Council of Australia.

== Platforms and services ==
Reservoir has one island platform with two faces. It is served by Mernda line trains.

Reservoir platform arrangement
Platform	Line	Destination	Service Type	Source
1	Mernda line	Flinders Street	All stations and limited express services	
2	Mernda line	Mernda	All stations	

== Transport links ==
Kinetic Melbourne operates seven bus routes via Reservoir station, under contract to Transport Victoria:

- 301 : to La Trobe University Bundoora campus
- 552 : North East Reservoir to Northcote Plaza
- 553 : Preston to West Preston
- 555 : Pacific Epping to Northland Shopping Centre
- 556 : Pacific Epping to Northland Shopping Centre
- 558 : to North West Reservoir
- 561 : Macleod to Pascoe Vale station

== Gallery ==
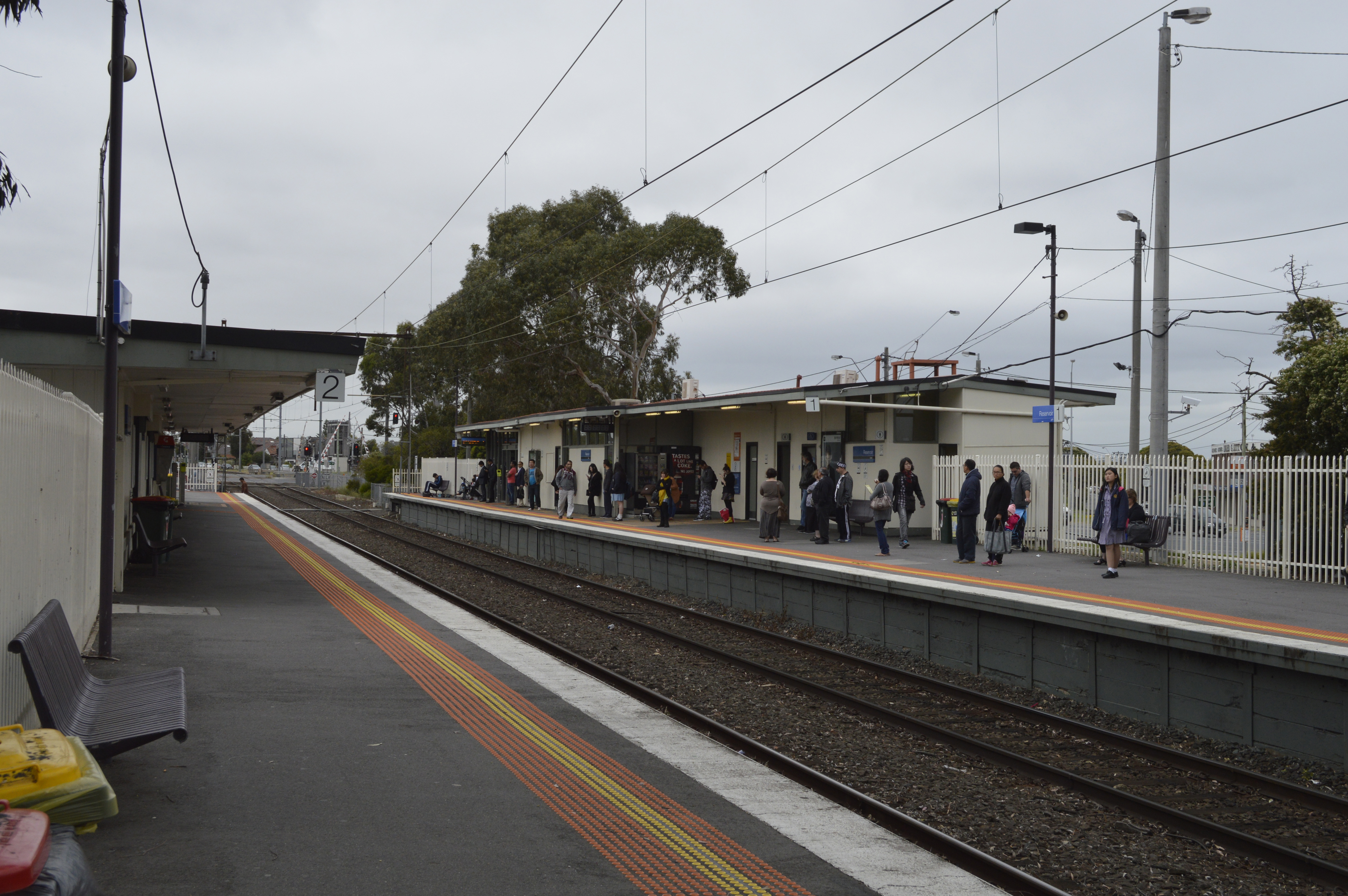
Northbound view from the former ground level Platform 2, November 2013

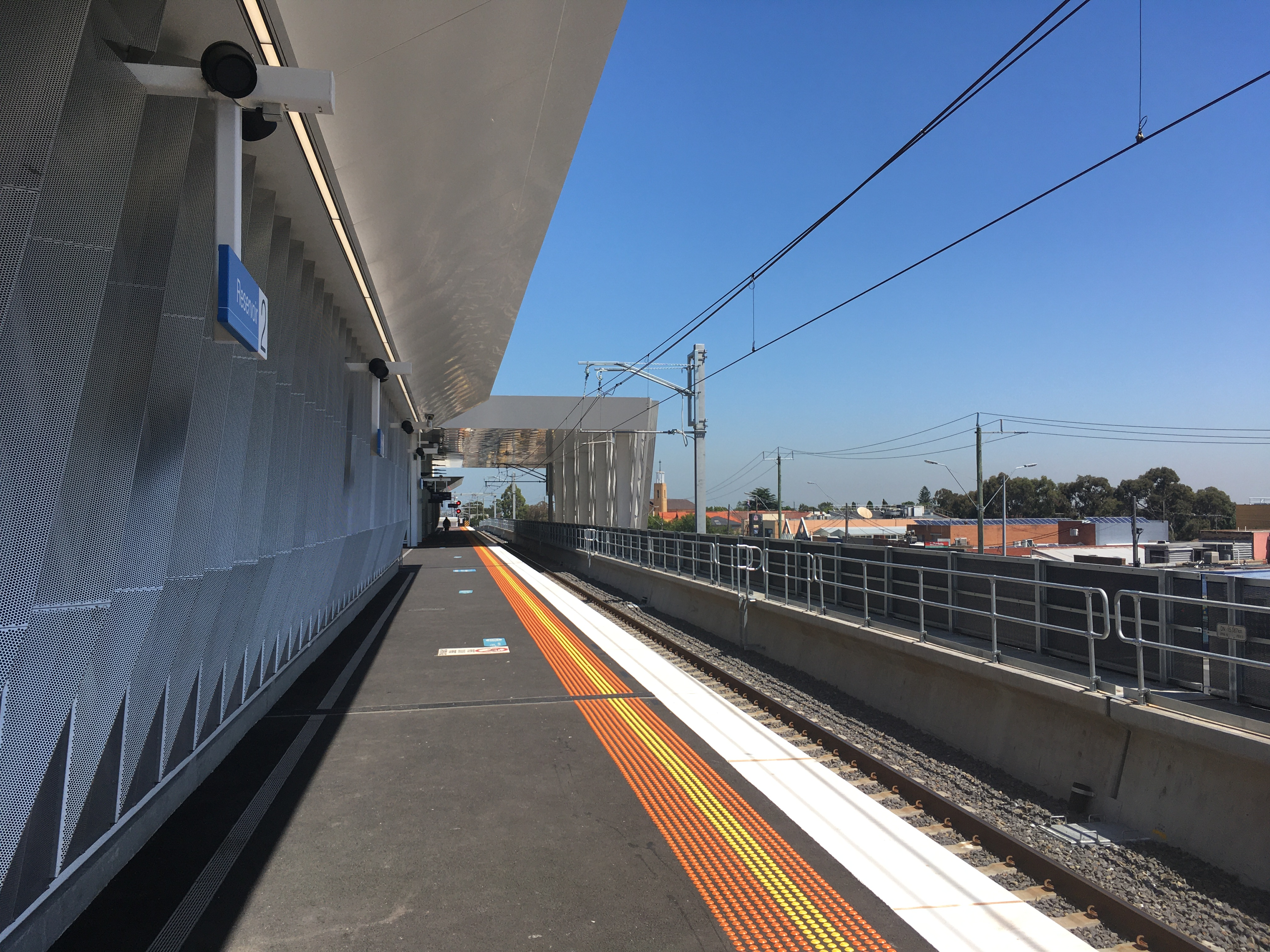
Southbound view from Platform 2, February 2020

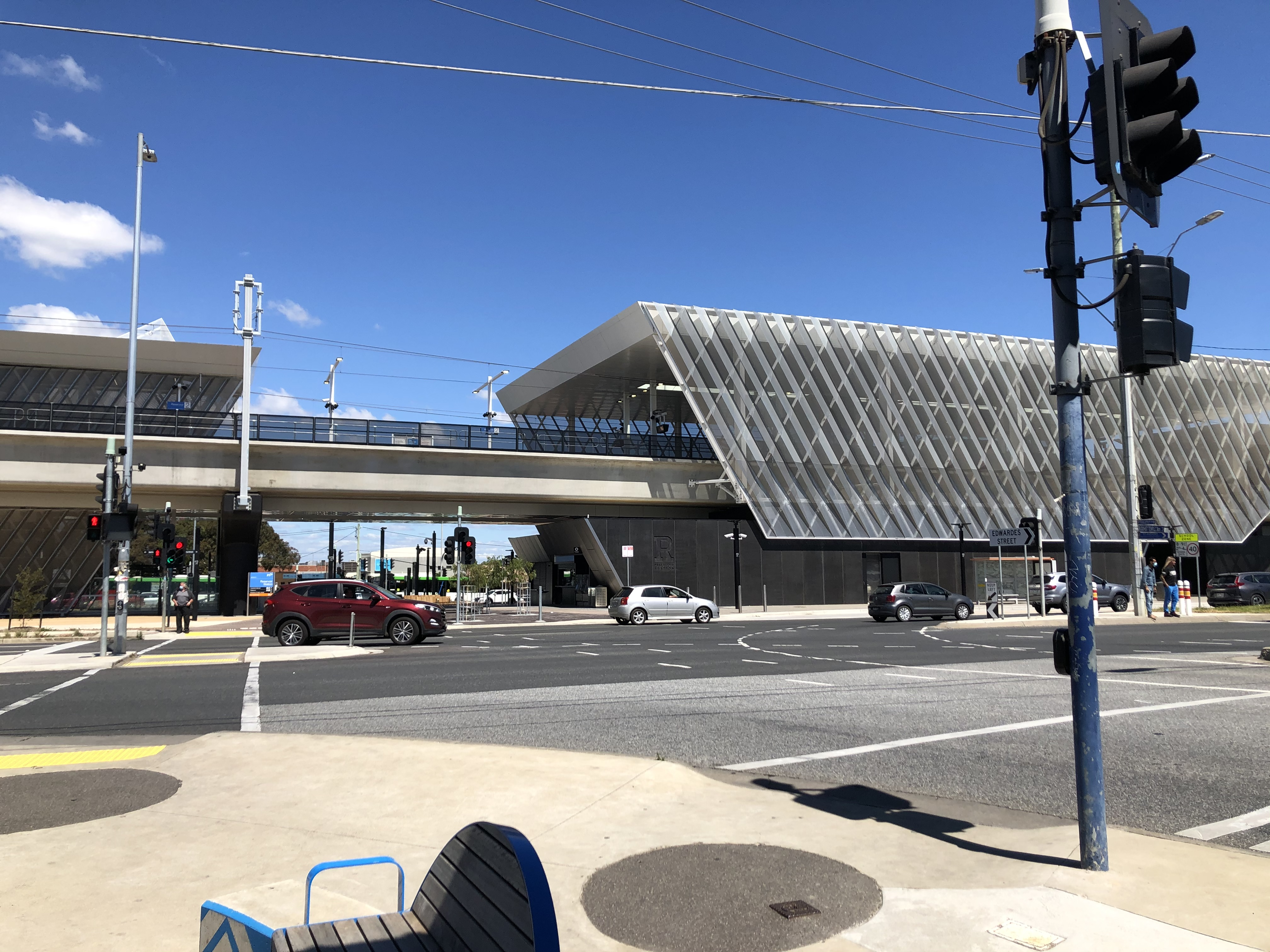
The new elevated station viewed from Edwardes and Spring Streets, December 2020

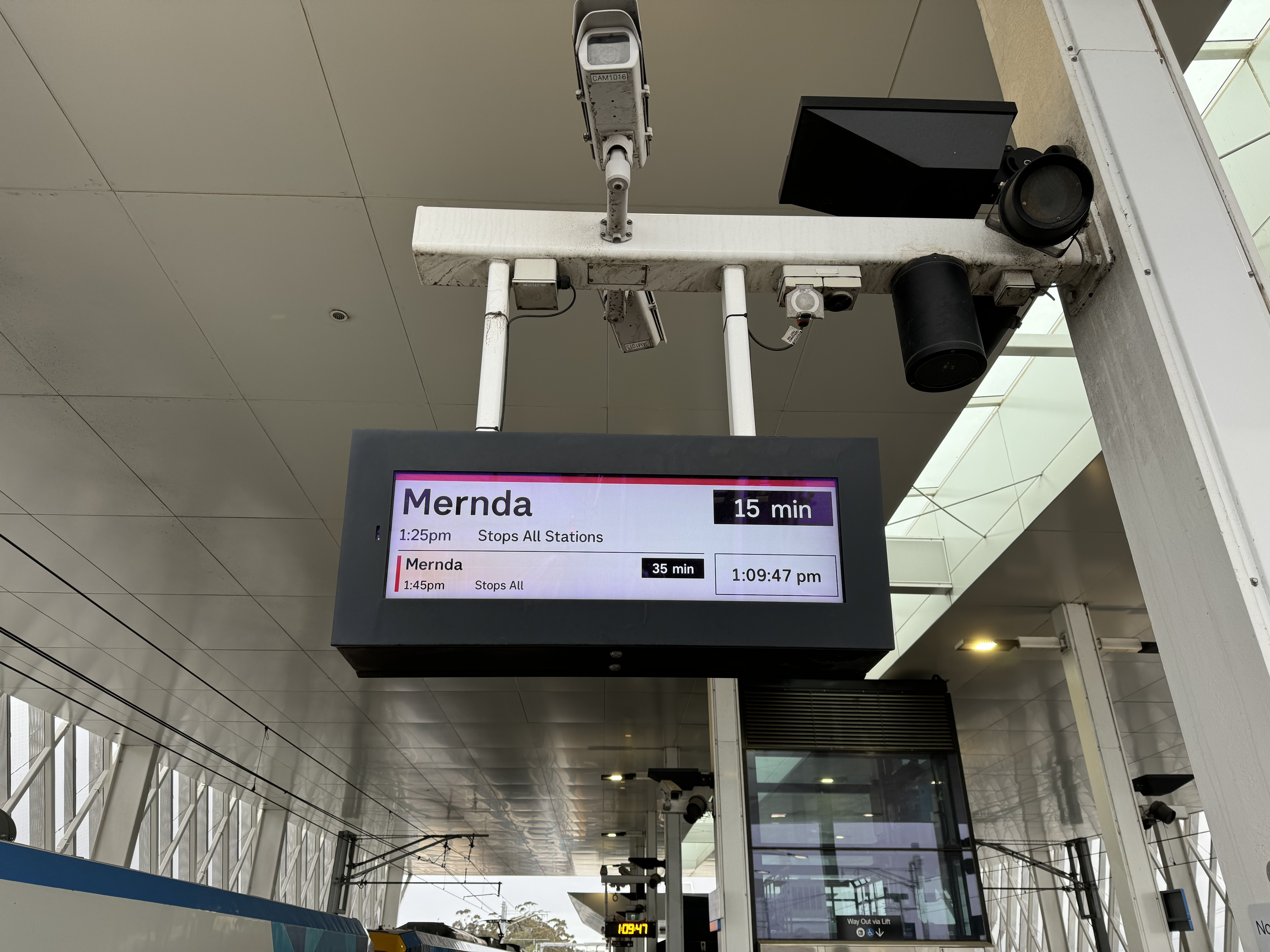
A station PID on Platform 1 displaying a Mernda-bound service

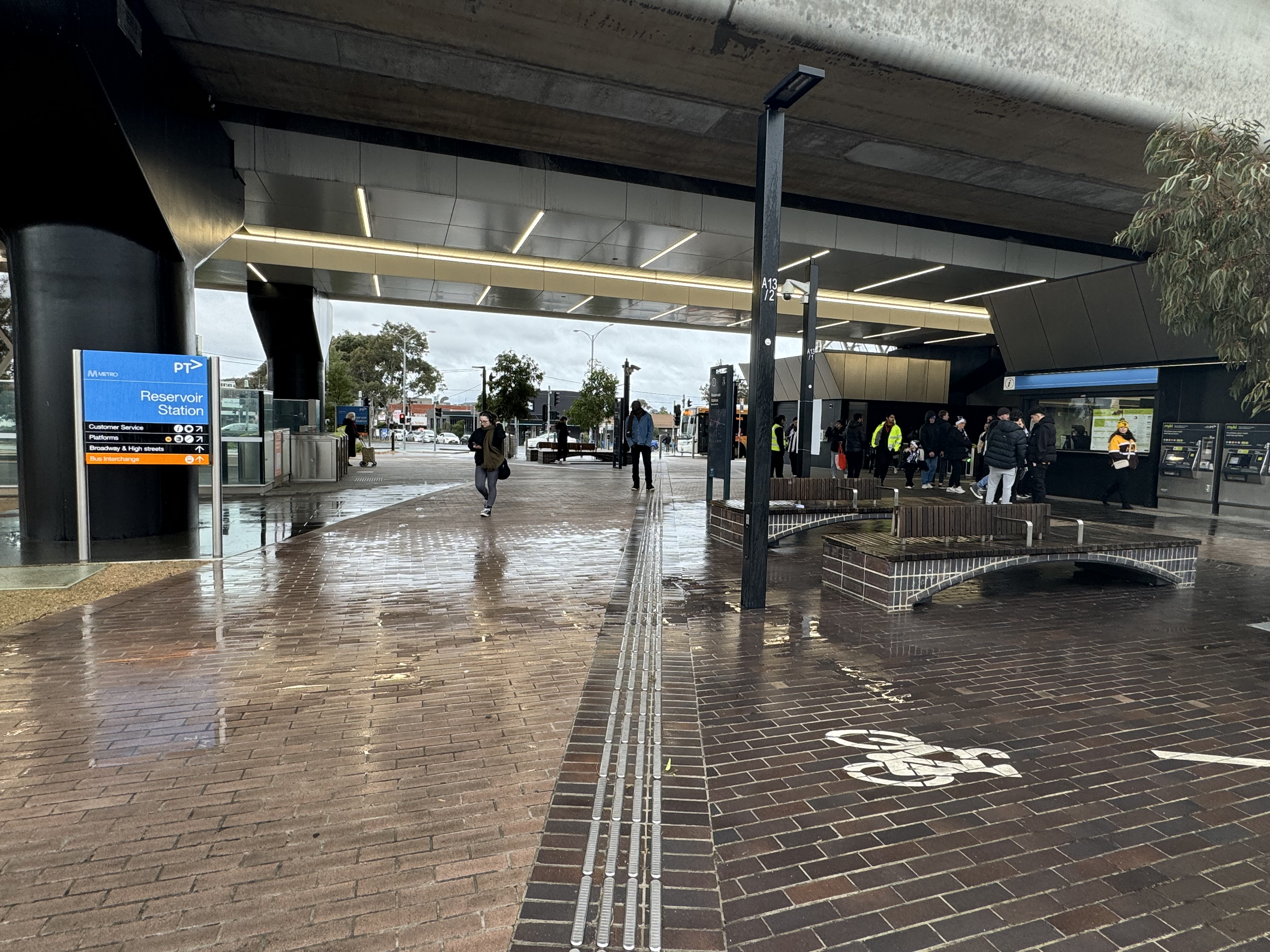
The station's forecourt, landscaping and concourse, July 2024

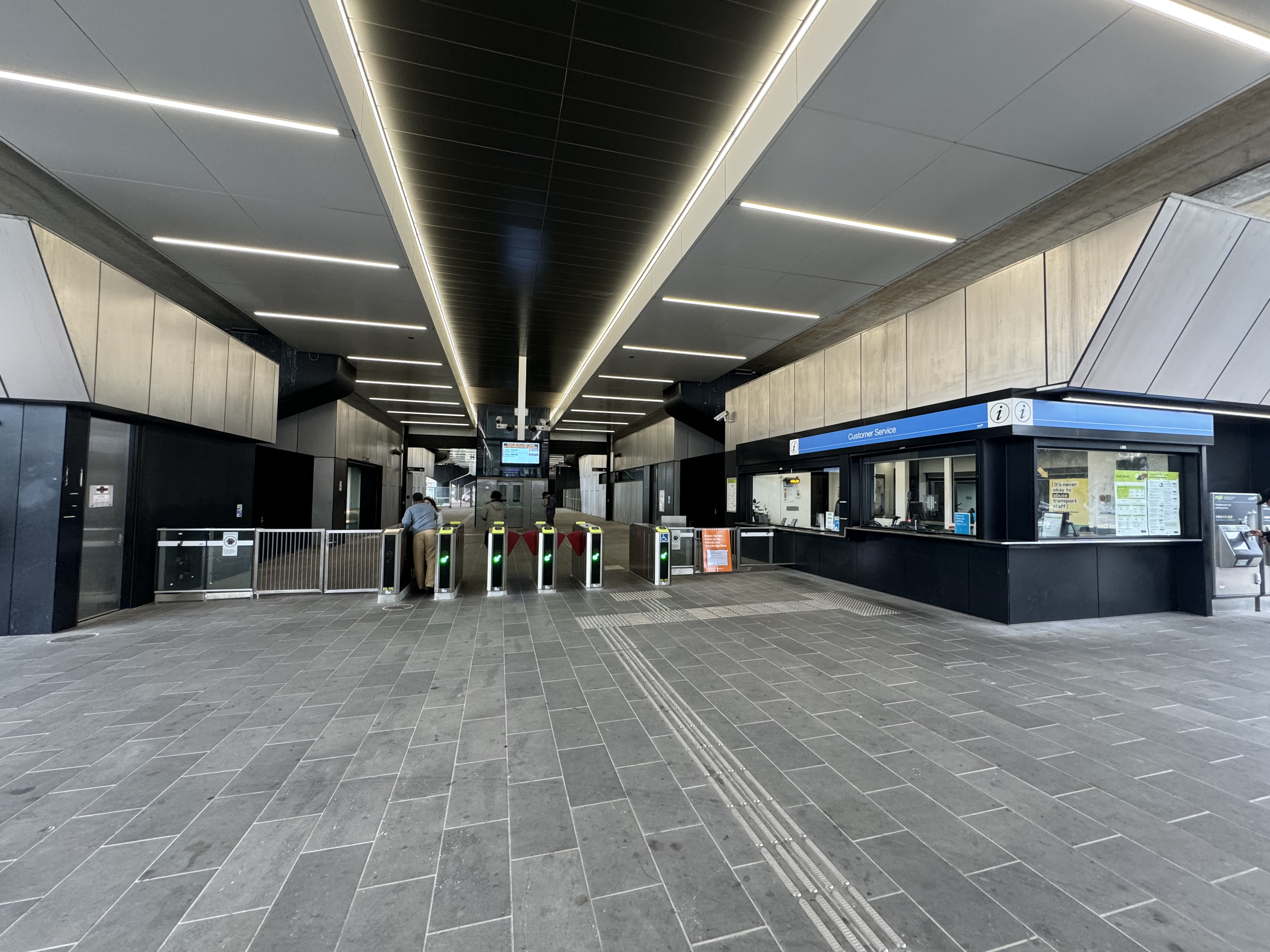
The customer service, Myki readers and concourse, July 2024

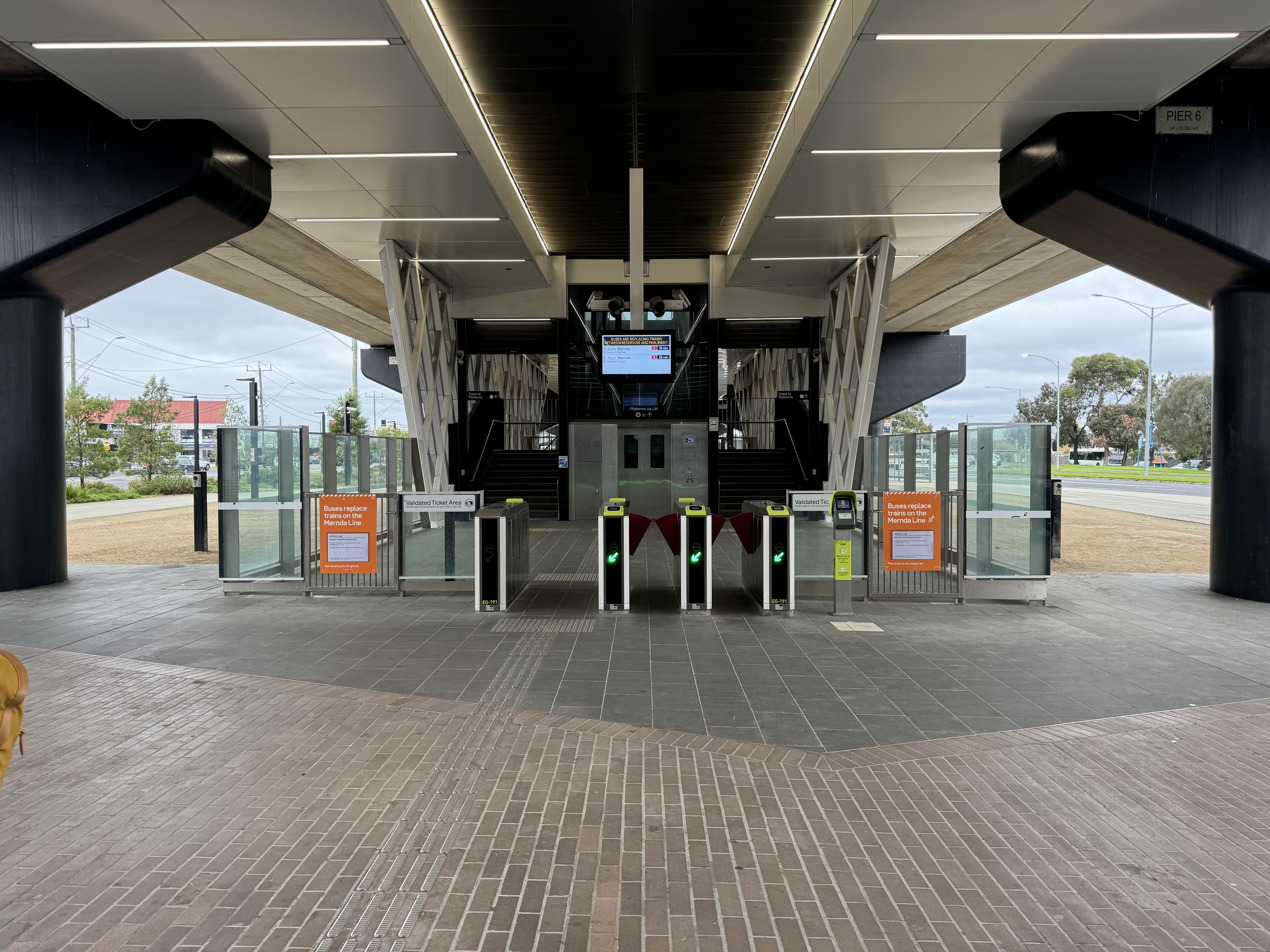
The northern side Myki readers, lifts and stairs from the main concourse, July 2024

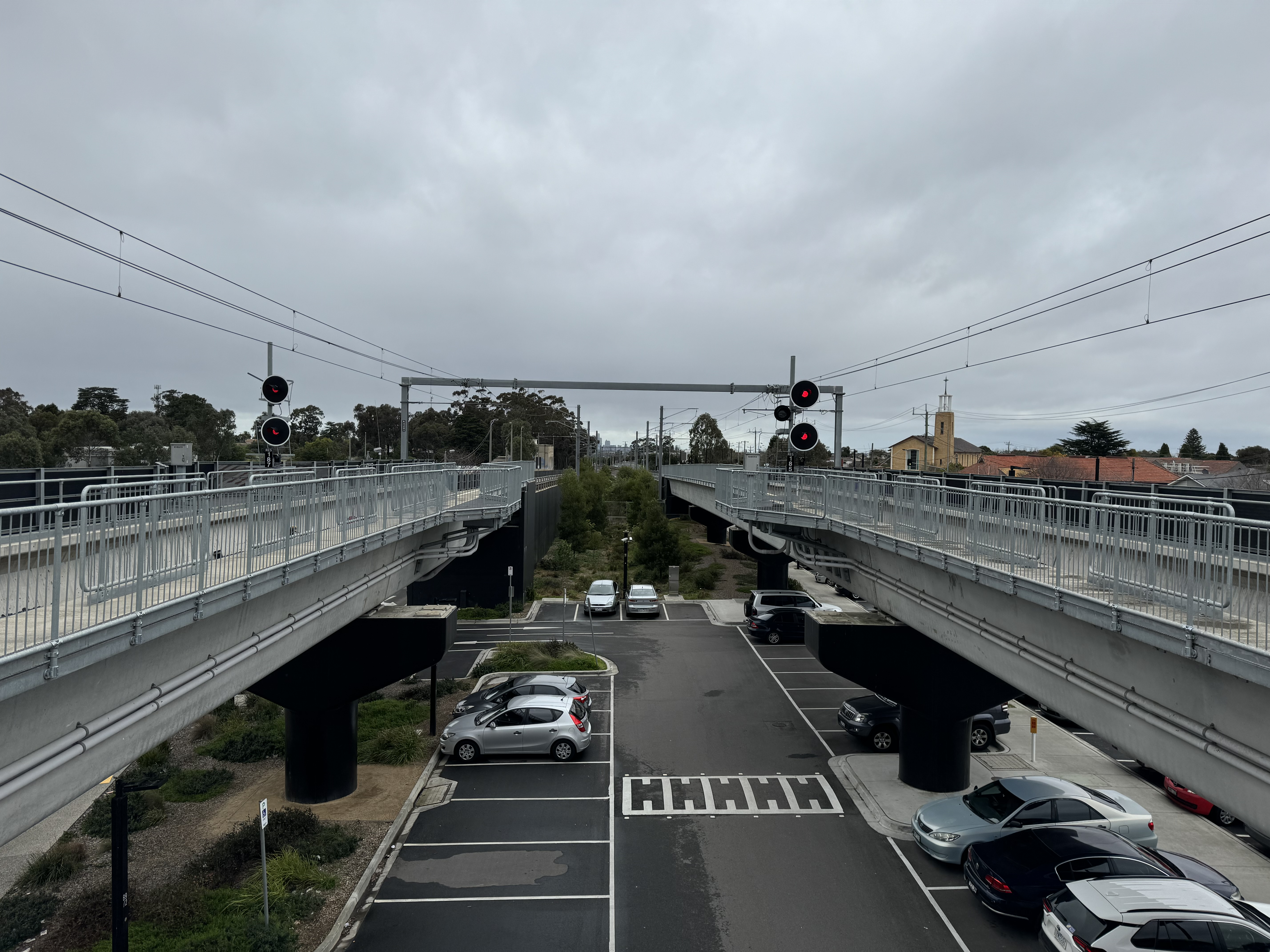
Southbound view of the station car park and partial views of Melbourne CBD, July 2024

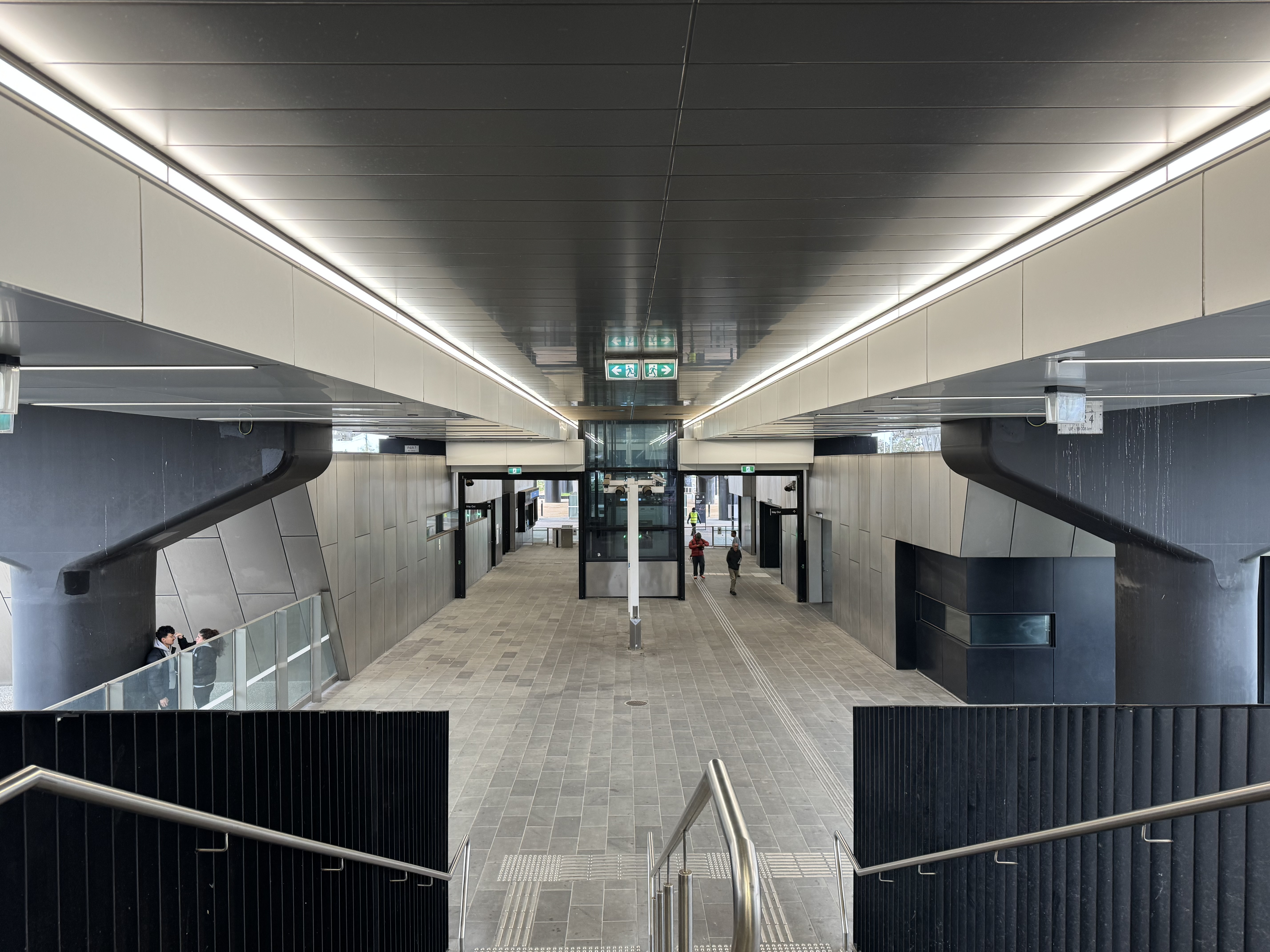
The southern end concourse at Reservoir station seen from the southern end stairs, July 2024

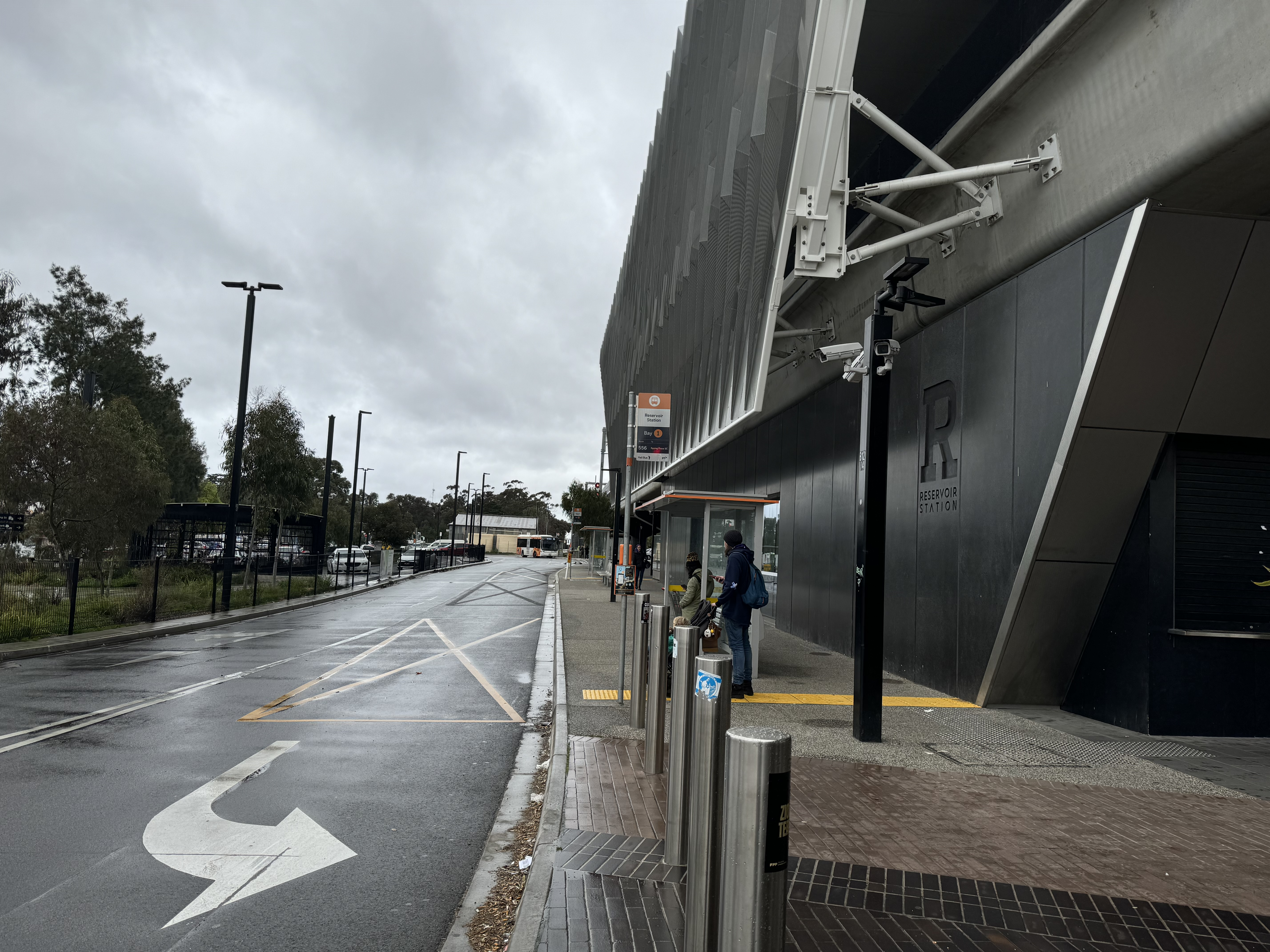
The High Street bus bays at Reservoir station,
July 2024

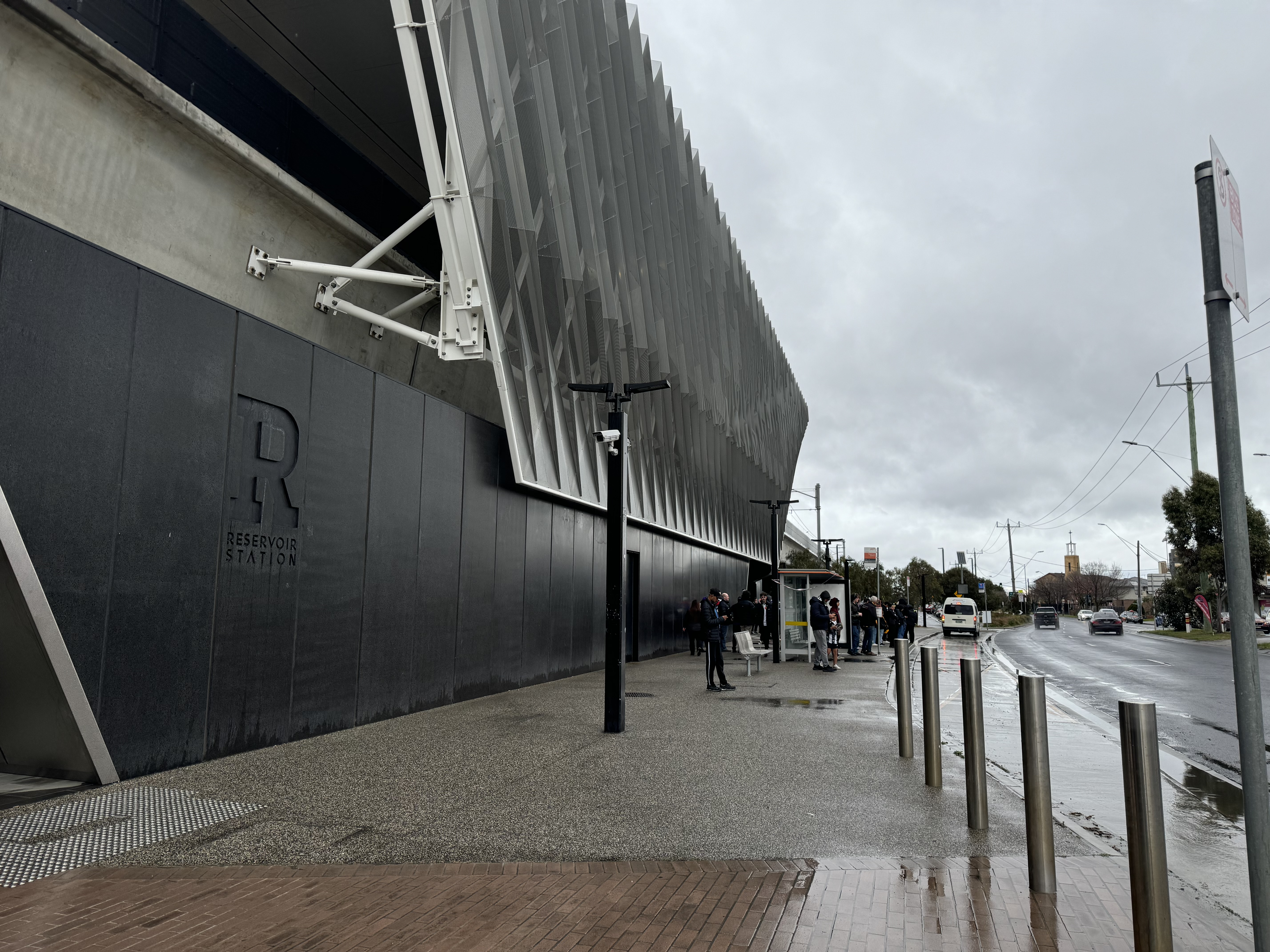
The western side view of Reservoir station,
July 2024

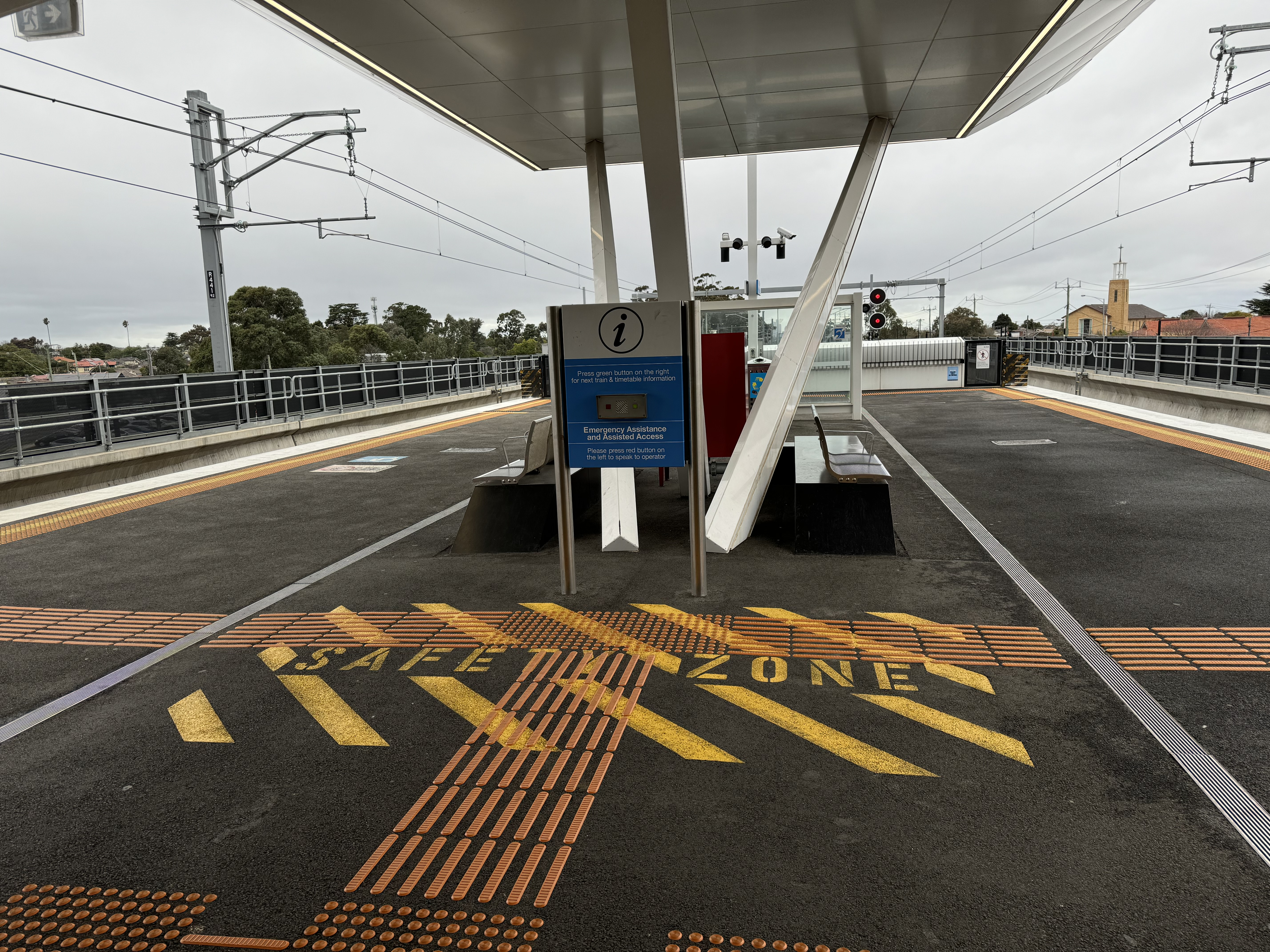
The southern end safety zone at Reservoir station, July 2024

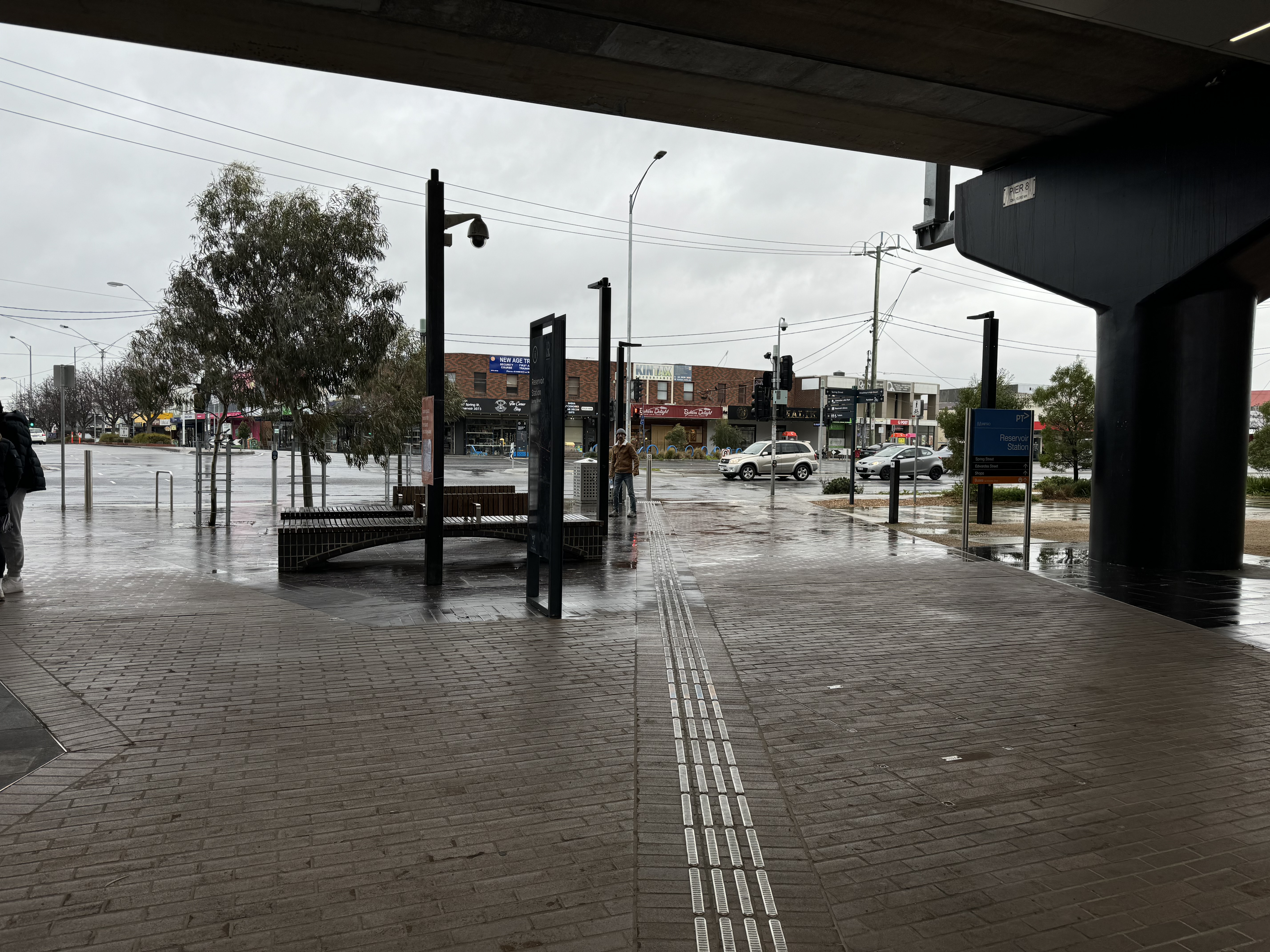
The forecourt facing towards Spring Street,
July 2024

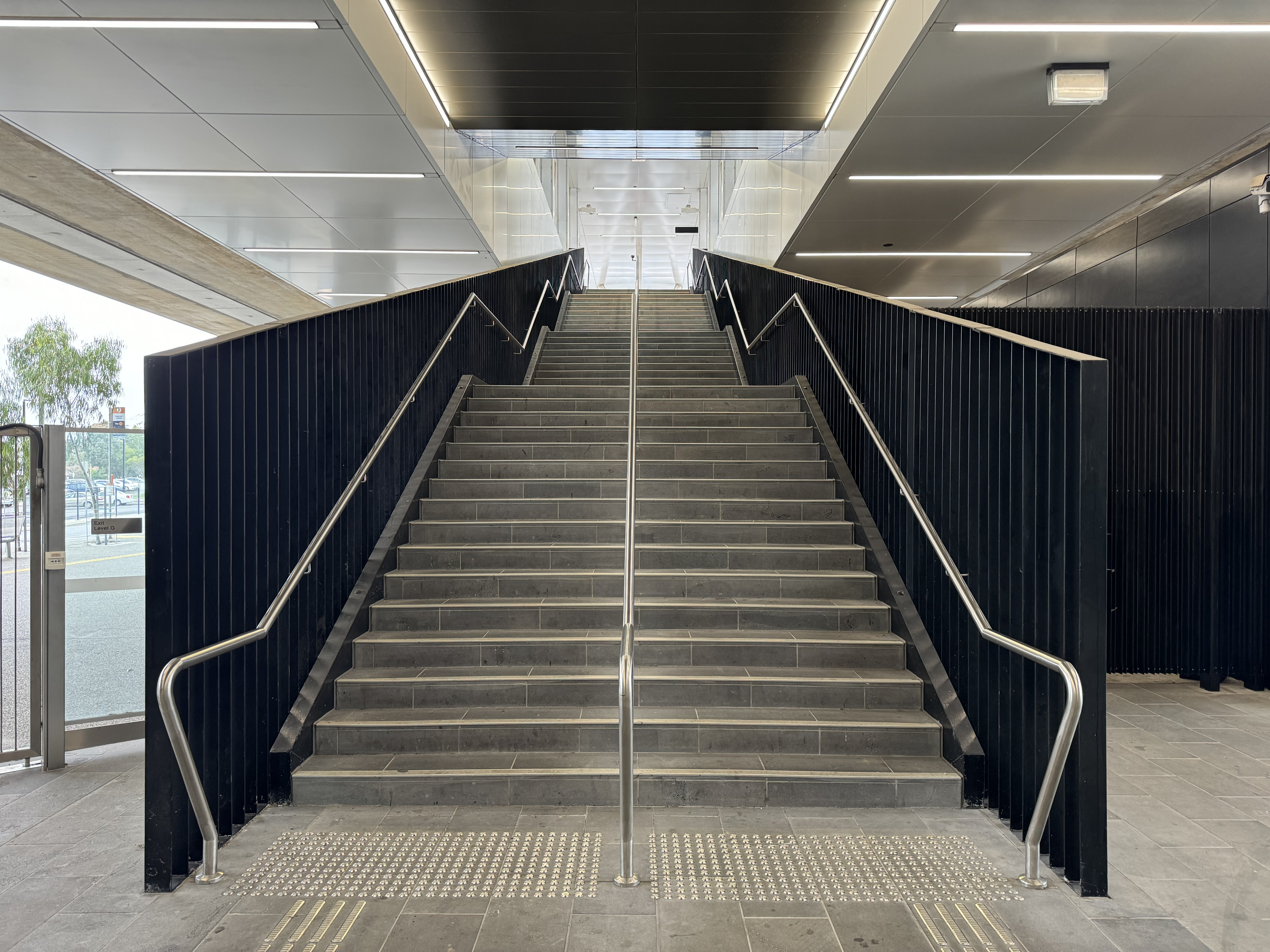
The southern end stairs leading to the platforms, July 2024

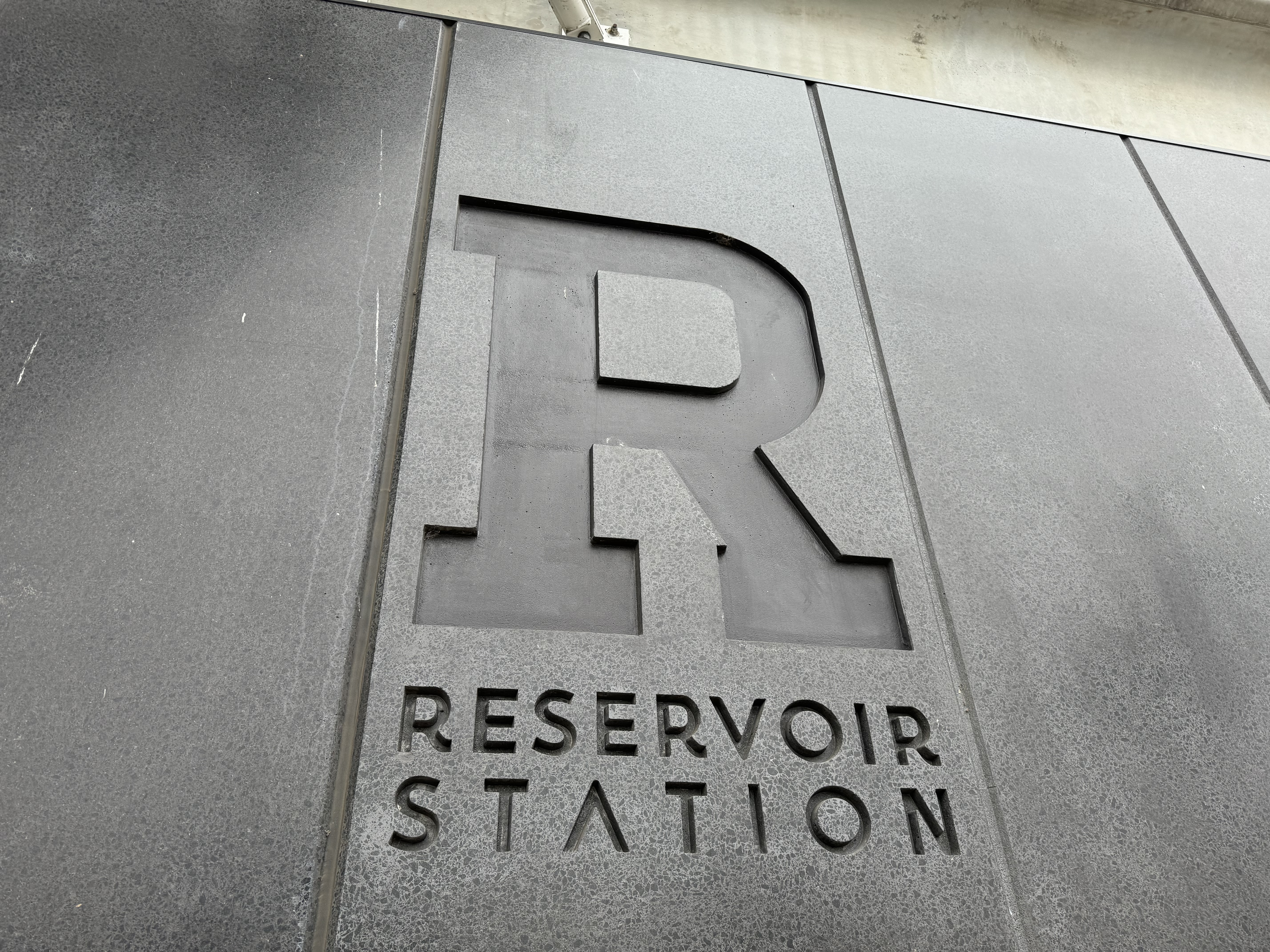
The built in wall station signage feature at Reservoir, July 2024

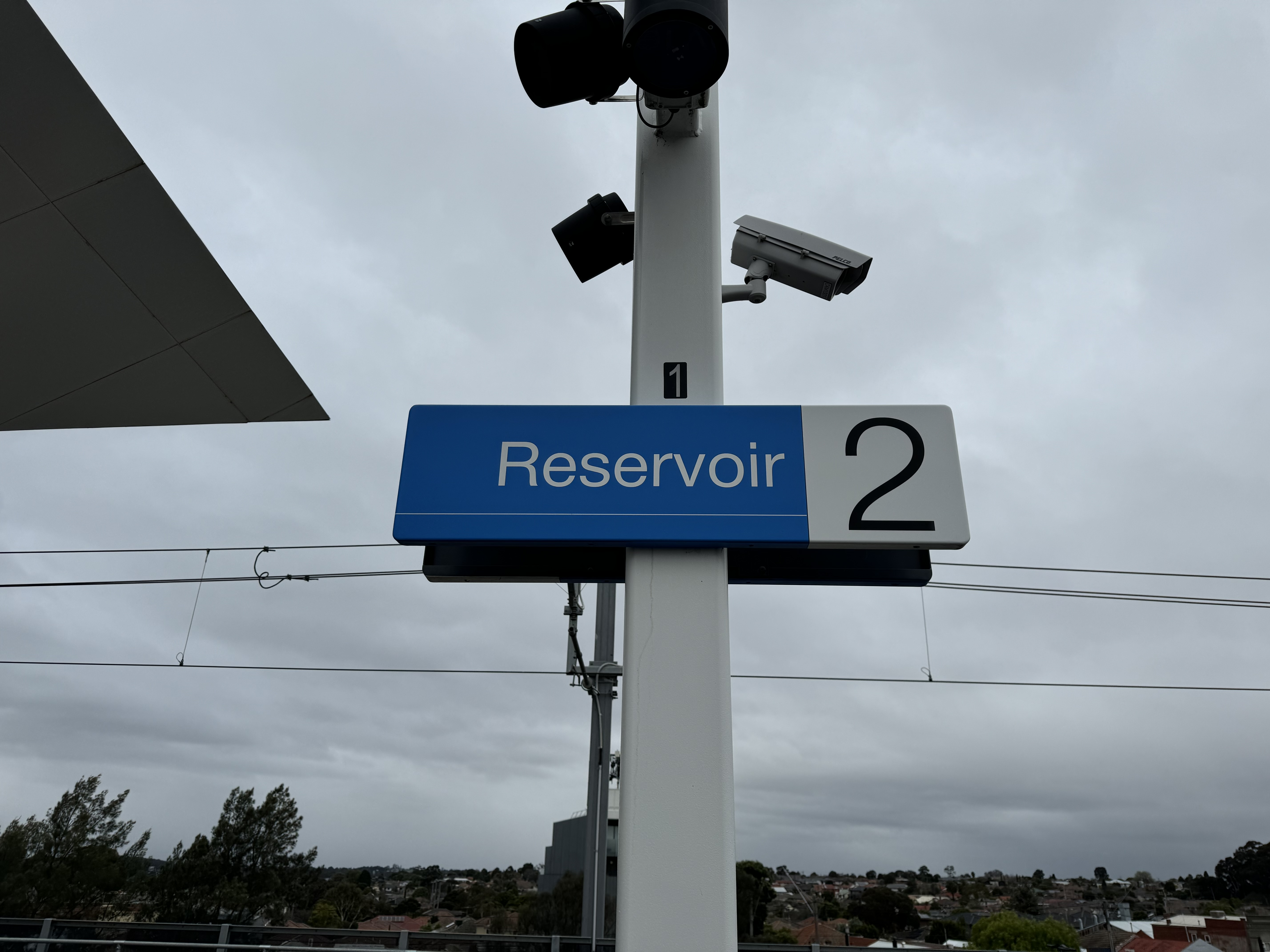
Station signage at Platform 2, July 2024
