= Epping railway station, Melbourne =

Railway station in Melbourne, Australia

Epping
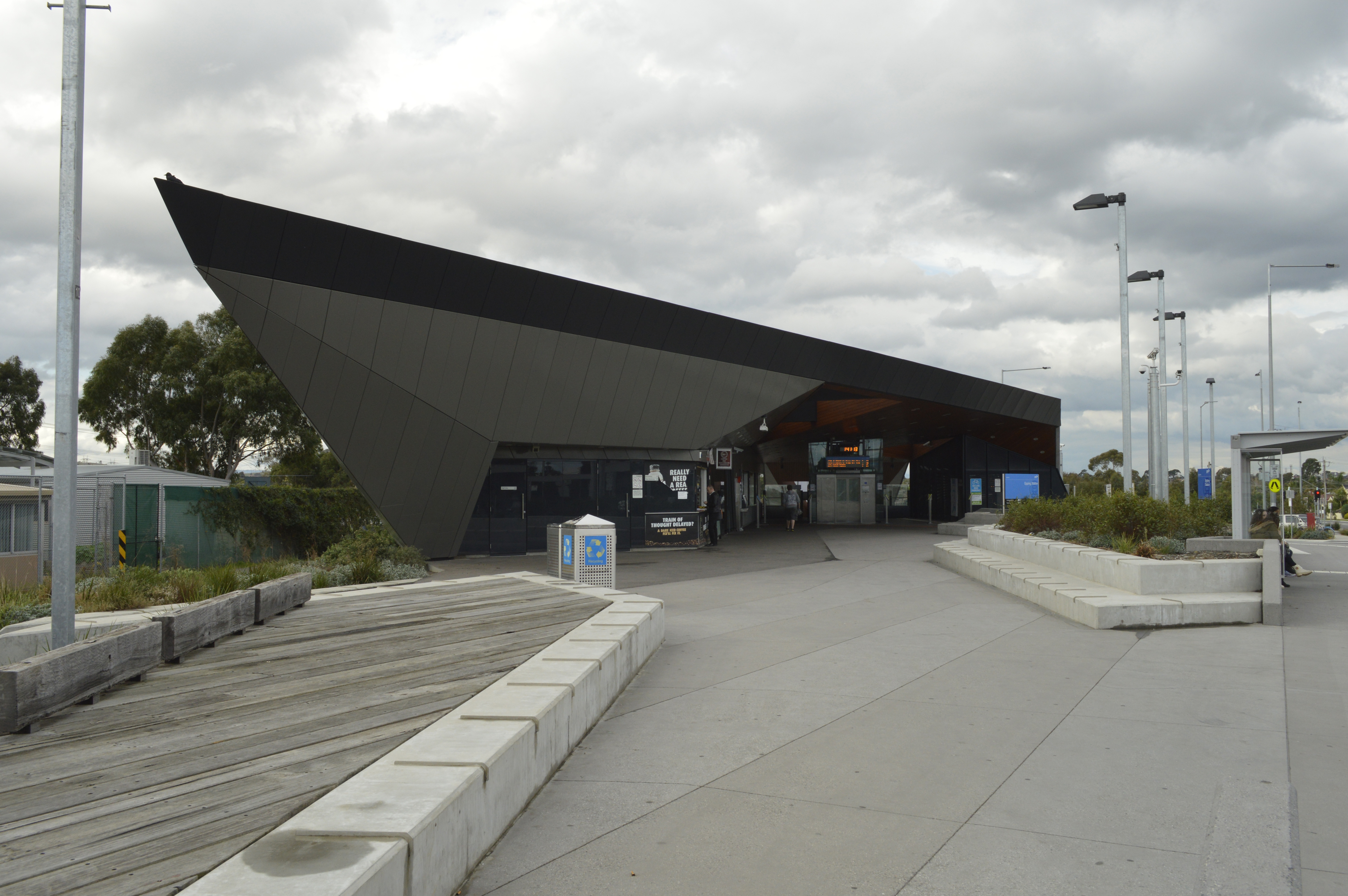
- Station building and entrance, May 2014

General information
- Location: Cooper Street, Epping, Victoria 3076; City of Whittlesea; Australia
- Coordinates: 37°39′08″S 145°01′51″E
- System: PTV commuter rail station
- Owner: VicTrack
- Operator: Metro Trains
- Lines: Mernda; Whittlesea (former)
- Distance: 22.82 kilometres from Southern Cross
- Platforms: 2 (1 island)
- Tracks: 2
- Connections: Bus

Construction
- Structure type: Below-ground
- Parking: 54
- Cycle facilities: Yes
- Accessible: Yes

Other information
- Status: Operational, premium station
- Station code: EPP
- Fare zone: Myki zone 2
- Website: Public Transport Victoria

History
- Opened: 23 December 1889; 136 years ago
- Closed: 28 November 1959
- Rebuilt: 29 November 1964; 1987–1988; 28 November 2011
- Electrified: November 1964 (1500 V DC overhead)

Passengers
- 2005–2006: 608,802
- 2006–2007: 699,741 ▲14.93%
- 2007–2008: 787,541 ▲12.54%
- 2008–2009: 891,140 ▲13.15%
- 2009–2010: 949,144 ▲6.5%
- 2010–2011: 856,720 ▼9.74%
- 2011–2012: 626,006 ▼26.93%
- 2012–2013: Not measured
- 2013–2014: 720,619 ▲15.1%
- 2014–2015: 702,644 ▼2.49%
- 2015–2016: 797,360 ▲13.48%
- 2016–2017: 822,977 ▲3.21%
- 2017–2018: 861,078 ▲4.63%
- 2018–2019: 887,650 ▲3.08%
- 2019–2020: 690,350 ▼22.23%
- 2020–2021: 417,650 ▼39.5%
- 2021–2022: 434,500 ▲4.03%
- 2022–2023: 672,900 ▲54.87%
- 2023–2024: 725,350 ▲7.79%
- 2024–2025: 748,150 ▲3.14%

Services
Preceding station	Metro Trains	Following station
Lalor towards Flinders Street	Mernda line	South Morang towards Mernda
Closed services
Preceding station	VicRail	Following station
Lalor towards Thomastown	Whittlesea line	South Morang towards Whittlesea
List of closed railway stations in Melbourne
Track layout
Location

Epping station is a railway station on the Mernda line, which is part of the Melbourne rail network. It serves the northern suburb of the same name, and was opened on 23 December 1889. Since 2011, it has been a below-ground, premium station, with an island platform.

== History ==
Epping station was opened as a stop on the line to Whittlesea, with trains designated as country services. From 1924, an AEC railmotor shuttle service operated from Reservoir to Whittlesea, until the line was closed north of Lalor on 29 November 1959.

On 30 November 1964, a new station opened a little further down the line, as part of the electrification of the line from Lalor to Epping. The station building was relocated from Glen Waverley, which was being rebuilt at the time. On 1 January 1971, the building was damaged by a deliberately lit fire.

During the late 1980s, the station was rebuilt, in conjunction with the construction of an adjacent train maintenance facility. The north face of the ground-level island platform was brought into use in July 1987, along with temporary station buildings. A new platform was built on a new alignment, with 200 metres of new track needed to link to the existing line. By the end of that month, the former platform and station building, dating from 1964, had been demolished, along with the alignment of the track and overhead wiring. The south face of the former ground level island platform (Platform 1) was brought into use nine months later, in April 1988. In 1989, new Solid State Interlocking was commissioned, which was the first fully computerised system in Melbourne.

In 1990, the new maintenance facility was opened, which was a replacement for the Jolimont Workshops in central Melbourne. The depot covers 10.8 hectares, and can accommodate 31 trains, with the facility including a main workshop building, four elevated tracks, two lifting tracks and a train wash. On 23 July 1998, Epping was upgraded to a premium station.

At about 0914 on 18 June 2002, two Comeng train sets collided approximately 1 km south of the station.

In 2010, construction commenced on a new, below-ground island platform north of Cooper Street, as part of a grade separation project in conjunction with the duplication of the line from Keon Park and its extension to South Morang station. The rebuilt station opened on 28 November 2011. The former ground-level island platform and station building were demolished soon after and, in early 2012, a number of stabling sidings were built on the site.

== Platforms, facilities and services ==
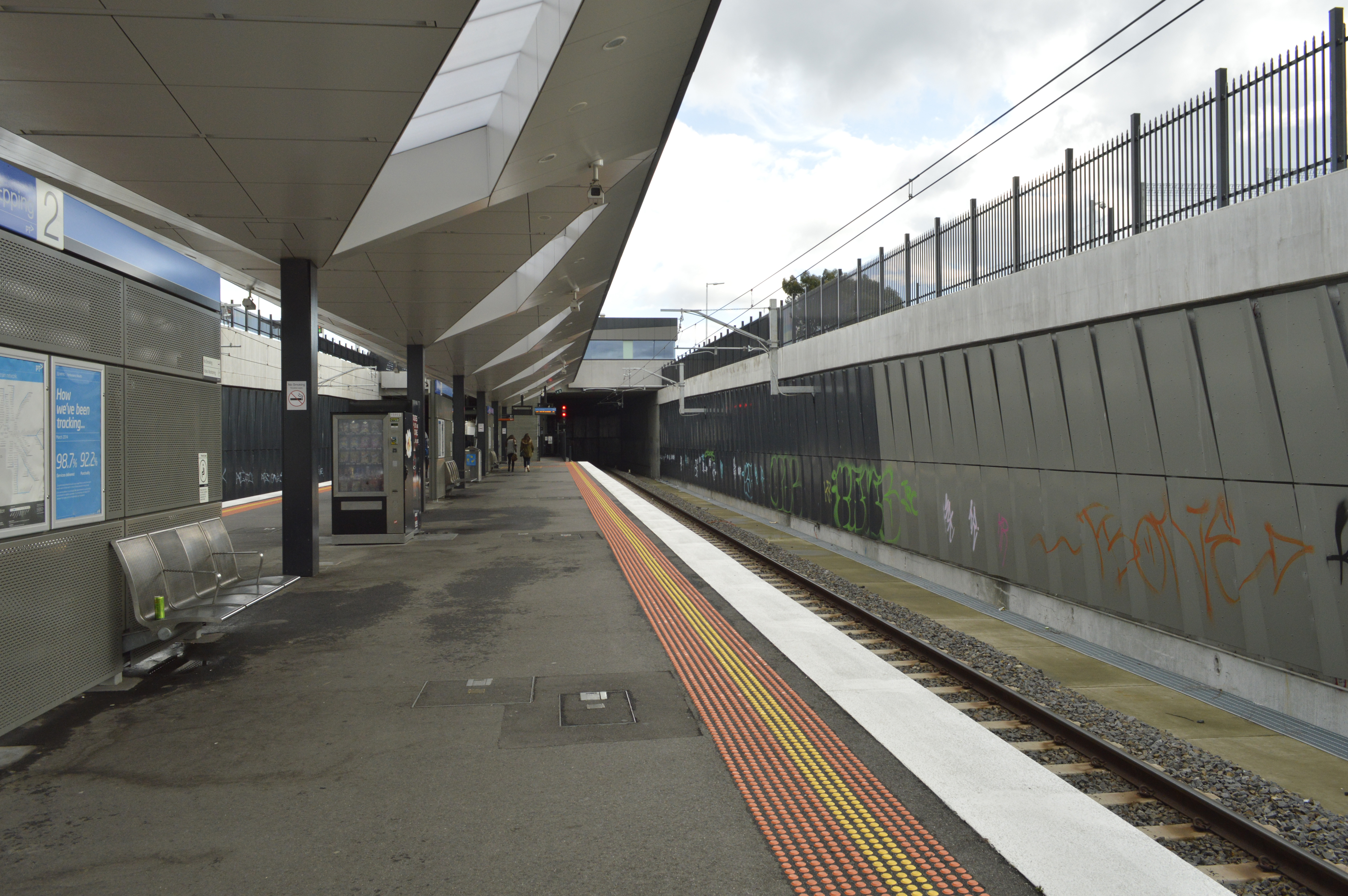
Westbound view from Platform 2, May 2014

Epping has one island platform with two faces and is served by Mernda line trains. Access to the platforms is provided by stairs and a lift. The station concourse contains a customer service window, an enclosed waiting room, toilets and a kiosk.

Epping platform arrangement
Platform	Line	Destination	Service Type	Source
1	Mernda line	Flinders Street	All stations and limited express services	
2	Mernda line	Mernda	All stations	

== Transport links ==
Kinetic Melbourne operates seven bus routes via Epping station, under contract to Transport Victoria:

- 356 : to Wollert East
- 357 : Wollert West – Thomastown station
- 358 : to Wollert
- 556 : Pacific Epping – Northland Shopping Centre
- 569 : Pacific Epping – South Morang station
- 577 : Pacific Epping – South Morang station
- SmartBus 901 : Frankston station – Melbourne Airport
