= Whittlesea railway station, Melbourne =

Former railway station in Victoria, Australia

Coordinates: 37°30′54″S 145°7′2″E

Whittlesea
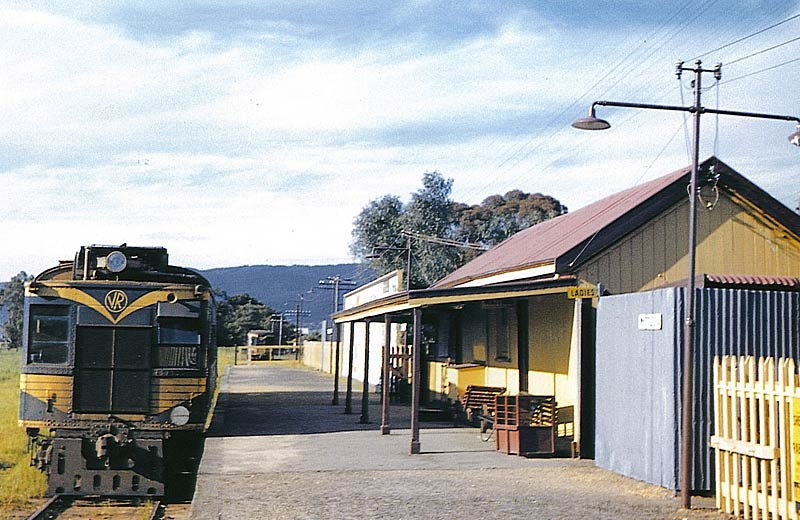
- Whittlesea station platform and building, 1954

General information
- Line: Whittlesea
- Platforms: 1
- Tracks: 4, including run-around loop and siding connected with the Kinglake timber tramway

Other information
- Status: Closed

History
- Opened: 23 December 1889
- Closed: 29 November 1959

Services
Preceding station	VicRail	Following station
Yan Yean towards Thomastown	Whittlesea line	Terminus
List of closed railway stations in Melbourne
Location

Whittlesea was the original terminus of the Whittlesea line, located in Victoria, Australia. It opened in 1889, operating until the closure of the line in 1959.

== History ==
Despite its proximity to Melbourne, the town of Whittlesea had a small population, as did the other settlements served by the line beyond the electrified Melbourne suburban railway system.

The station included a siding which connected to the Kinglake timber tramway.

The freight trains to Whittlesea ceased in the mid-1950s, with the passenger service remaining until the line beyond Lalor was closed on 29 November 1959.

The line was partially reopened for suburban electric trains as far Epping in November 1964, with the track beyond removed in 1970. The section from Epping to South Morang was reinstated in April 2012, and the section between South Morang and Mernda was reopened in 2018. The rest of the former right-of-way remains in Victorian Government ownership, being classed as parkland.
