= Thomastown railway station, Melbourne =

Railway station in Melbourne, Australia

Thomastown
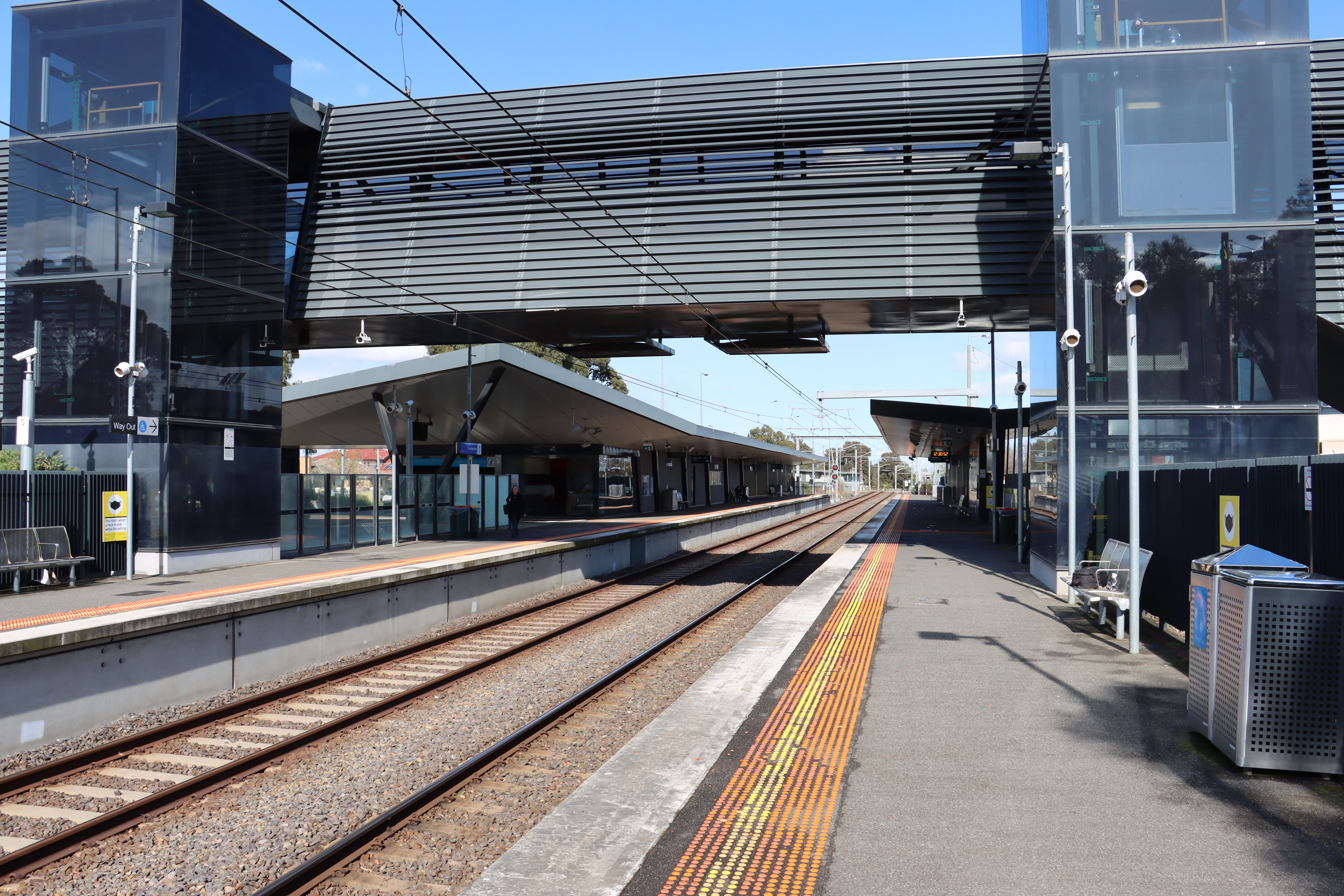
- Southbound view from Platform 2, August 2022

General information
- Location: Station Street, Thomastown, Victoria 3074; City of Whittlesea; Australia
- Coordinates: 37°40′49″S 145°00′51″E
- System: PTV commuter rail station
- Owner: VicTrack
- Operator: Metro Trains
- Lines: Mernda; Whittlesea (former)
- Distance: 19.07 kilometres from Southern Cross
- Platforms: 2 side
- Tracks: 2
- Connections: Bus

Construction
- Structure type: Ground
- Parking: 310
- Cycle facilities: Yes
- Accessible: Yes—step free access

Other information
- Status: Operational, premium station
- Station code: TSN
- Fare zone: Myki zone 2
- Website: Transport Victoria

History
- Opened: 23 December 1889; 136 years ago
- Rebuilt: 1969; 28 November 2011
- Electrified: December 1929 (1500 V DC overhead)

Passengers
- 2005–2006: 552,193
- 2006–2007: 645,108 ▲16.82%
- 2007–2008: 736,547 ▲14.17%
- 2008–2009: 871,835 ▲18.36%
- 2009–2010: 901,163 ▲3.36%
- 2010–2011: 888,904 ▼1.36%
- 2011–2012: 734,174 ▼17.4%
- 2012–2013: Not measured
- 2013–2014: 793,814 ▲8.12%
- 2014–2015: 790,859 ▼0.37%
- 2015–2016: 854,998 ▲8.11%
- 2016–2017: 783,606 ▼8.35%
- 2017–2018: 832,083 ▲6.19%
- 2018–2019: 806,600 ▼3.06%
- 2019–2020: 600,300 ▼25.6%
- 2020–2021: 343,750 ▼42.7%
- 2021–2022: 391,050 ▲13.76%
- 2022–2023: 571,800 ▲46.22%

Services
Preceding station	Metro Trains	Following station
Keon Park towards Flinders Street	Mernda line	Lalor towards Mernda
Former services
Preceding station	VicRail	Following station
Terminus	Whittlesea line	Lalor towards Whittlesea
List of closed railway stations in Melbourne
Track layout
Location

Thomastown station is a railway station operated by Metro Trains Melbourne on the Mernda line, which is part of the Melbourne rail network. It serves the northern suburb of Thomastown, in Melbourne, Victoria, Australia. Thomastown is a ground-level premium station, featuring two side platforms. It opened on 23 December 1889, with the current station provided in 2011.

== History ==
Opening on 23 December 1889, when the railway line was extended from Reservoir to Epping, Thomastown station, like the suburb itself, is named after John and Mary Thomas, who began market gardening near Edgars Creek in 1848.

The station was originally serviced by regional trains on the line to Whittlesea. Electrification and suburban services were extended along 4.4 kilometres of single track from Reservoir to Thomastown in 1929, paid for by a land developer, who paid for the works and who also guaranteed against operating losses. From 1931, it was the terminus of the railmotor service from Whittlesea, remaining so until electric suburban services were extended to Lalor in November 1959, with services beyond Lalor discontinued and the line closed.

On 7 August 1967, the original station building was destroyed by fire. In 1969, a new station building, which was of a brick construction, was provided.

In 1968, flashing light signals were provided at the Heyington Avenue level crossing, located nearby in the up direction of the station. In 1980, boom barriers were provided. By the late 1980s, much of the yard to the east of the station was removed.

On 20 December 1996, Thomastown was upgraded to a premium station.

In September 2007, a VicRoads park & ride upgrade opened, with an additional 100 car spaces opened to the south-east of the station, taking the total to 382. In 2010, 90 additional car parking spaces were provided.

As part of the duplication of the line from Keon Park to Epping, a second side platform was added, and the existing station rebuilt. On 28 November 2011, the current station opened.

== Platforms and services ==
Thomastown has two side platforms. It is serviced by Metro Trains' Mernda line services.

Thomastown platform arrangement
Platform	Line	Destination	Service Type	Source
1	Mernda line	Flinders Street	All stations and limited express services	
2	Mernda line	Mernda	All stations	

== Transport links ==
Kinetic Melbourne operates six bus routes via Thomastown station, under contract to Transport Victoria:

- 357 : to Wollert West
- 554 : to Thomastown station (clockwise loop via West Lalor)
- 555 : Pacific Epping – Northland Shopping Centre
- 557 : to Thomastown station (anti-clockwise loop via West Lalor)
- 559 : to Thomastown station (circular route via Darebin Drive)
- 570 : to RMIT University Bundoora campus

== Gallery ==
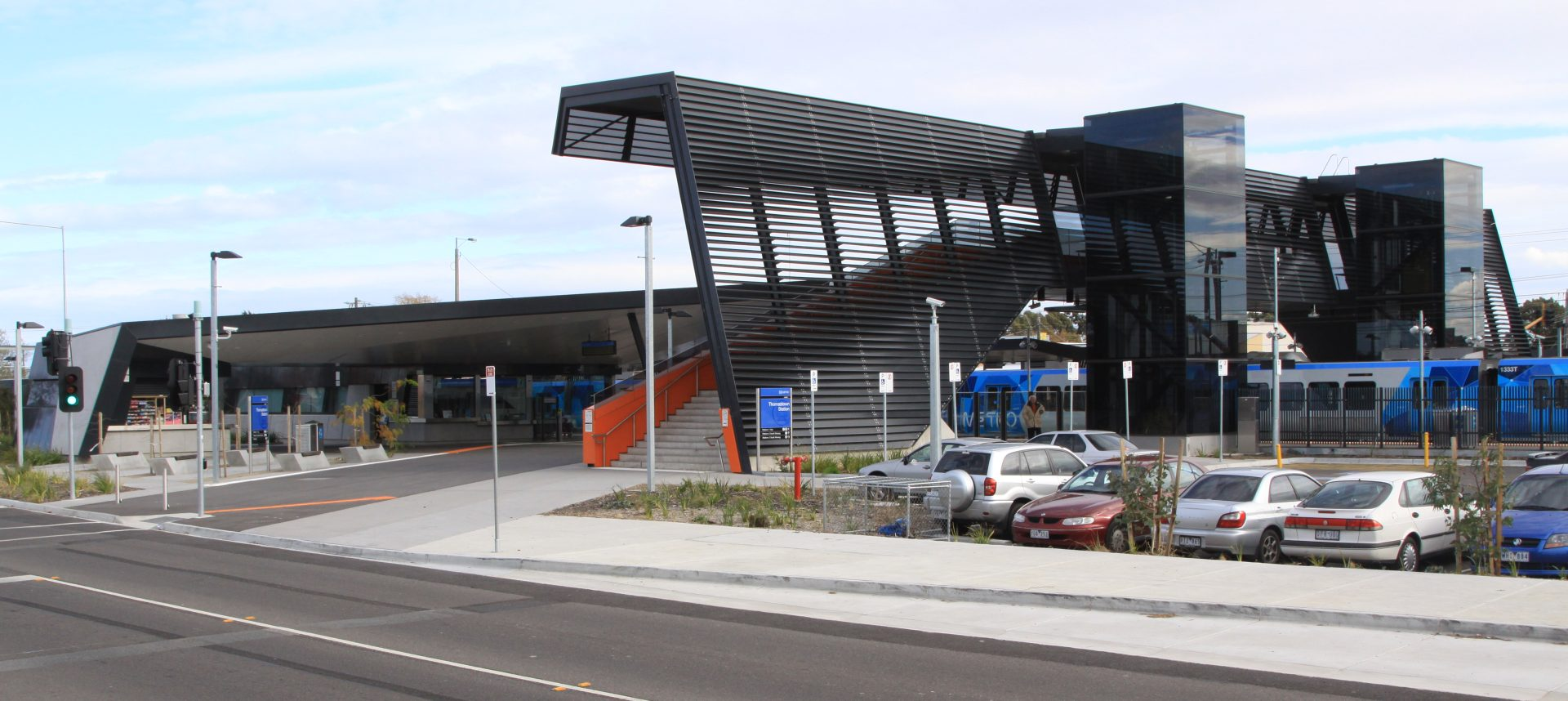
Station footbridge, building, concourse and entrance to Platform 1, June 2012
