= Lalor railway station =

Railway station in Melbourne, Australia

Lalor
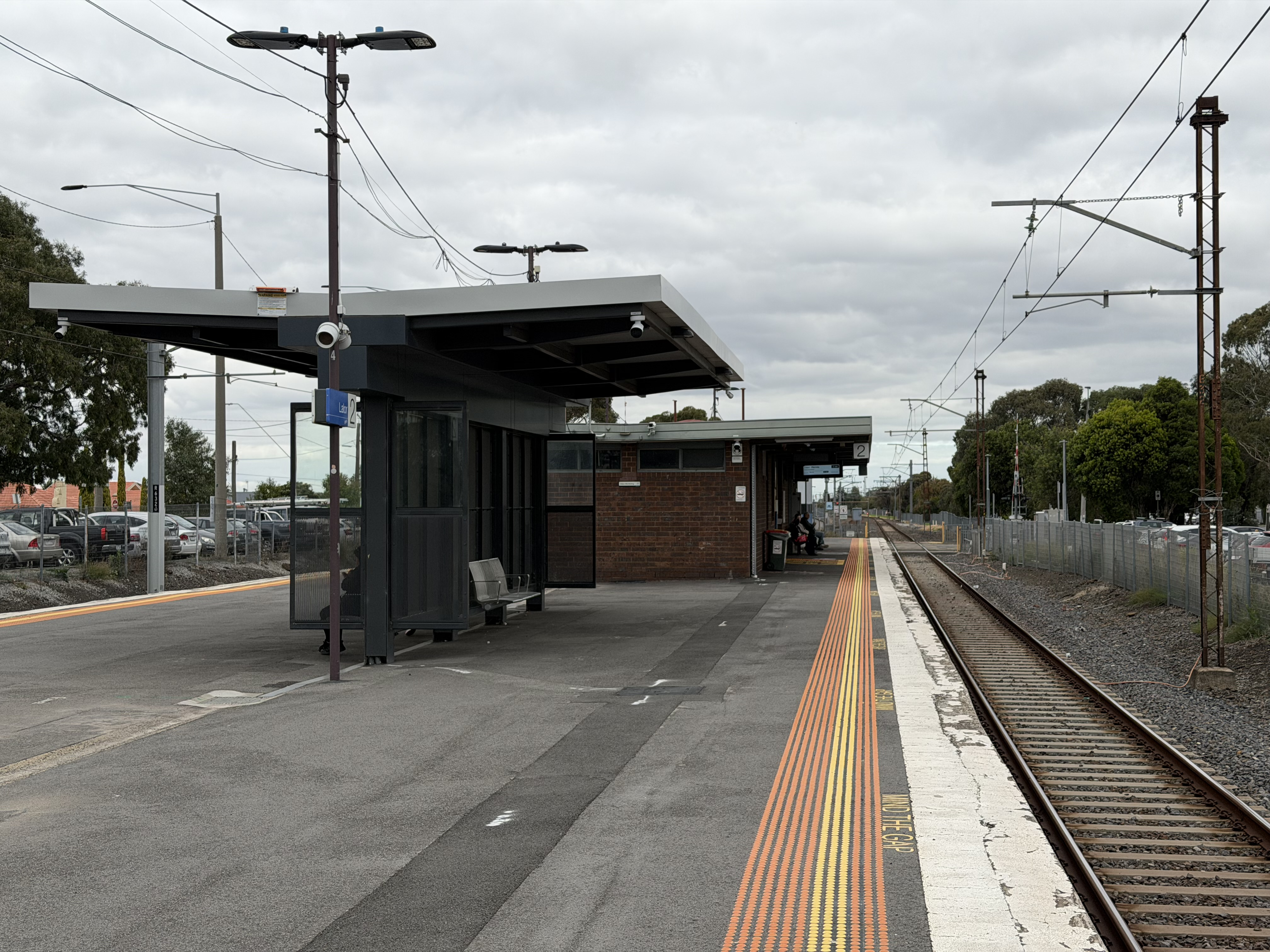
- Southbound view from Platform 2, May 2026

General information
- Location: Station Street, Lalor, Victoria 3075; City of Whittlesea; Australia
- Coordinates: 37°39′57″S 145°01′02″E
- System: PTV commuter rail station
- Owner: VicTrack
- Operator: Metro Trains
- Line: Mernda
- Distance: 20.72 kilometres from Southern Cross
- Platforms: 2 (1 island)
- Tracks: 2
- Connections: Bus

Construction
- Structure type: Ground
- Parking: 417
- Cycle facilities: Yes
- Accessible: Yes—step free access

Other information
- Status: Operational, unstaffed
- Station code: LAL
- Fare zone: Myki zone 2
- Website: Public Transport Victoria

History
- Opened: October 1949; 77 years ago
- Rebuilt: 26 November 1964; 1978
- Electrified: November 1959 (1500 V DC overhead)
- Former names: Rail Motor Stopping Place 77 (1949–1952)

Passengers
- 2005–2006: 323,019
- 2006–2007: 366,244 ▲13.38%
- 2007–2008: 410,353 ▲12.04%
- 2008–2009: 423,347 ▲3.16%
- 2009–2010: 441,521 ▲4.29%
- 2010–2011: 489,944 ▲10.97%
- 2011–2012: 521,699 ▲6.48%
- 2012–2013: Not measured
- 2013–2014: 488,403 ▼6.38%
- 2014–2015: 498,629 ▲2.09%
- 2015–2016: 560,852 ▲12.47%
- 2016–2017: 569,739 ▲1.58%
- 2017–2018: 597,717 ▲4.91%
- 2018–2019: 605,050 ▲1.22%
- 2019–2020: 477,500 ▼21.1%
- 2020–2021: 243,550 ▼49%
- 2021–2022: 241,700 ▼0.75%
- 2022–2023: 388,600 ▲60.78%

Services
Preceding station	Metro Trains	Following station
Thomastown towards Flinders Street	Mernda line	Epping towards Mernda
Track layout
Location

Lalor station is a railway station operated by Metro Trains Melbourne on the Mernda line, which is part of the Melbourne rail network. It serves the northern suburb of Lalor, in Melbourne, Victoria, Australia. Lalor is a ground-level staffed station, featuring an island platform with two faces. It opened in October 1949, with the current station provided in 1978.

Initially opened as Rail Motor Stopping Place 77, the station was given its current name of Lalor on 27 August 1952.

== History ==
Lalor station opened in October 1949, and was provided as part of a garden suburb created by the Peter Lalor Home Building Cooperative Society, which was formed by a group of ex-servicemen to provide cheap homes during a time of high demand and shortage of materials post World War II.

The station was originally served by Whittlesea trains from Melbourne via the former Inner Circle line and, in later times, by Thomastown – Whittlesea railmotor shuttles. In November 1959, the section from Thomastown was electrified, with the line beyond Lalor closed. On 29 November 1964, the line was reopened and electrified as far as Epping. Occurring in that year, the current island platform was provided, and flashing light signals were provided at the Paschke Crescent level crossing, located at the up end of the station.

In 1978, the present station building was provided. In 1980, boom barriers were provided at the Paschke Crescent level crossing.

The current day Platform 1 was formerly a dock platform. In August 1988, points from No. 1 track to the main line were provided at the down end of the station, effectively forming a crossing loop between Thomastown and Epping. This arrangement existed until November 2011, when the line between Keon Park and Epping was duplicated, with the points at both ends of the station abolished.

On 4 May 2010, as part of the 2010/2011 State Budget, $83.7 million was allocated to upgrade Lalor to a premium station, along with nineteen others. However, in March 2011, this was scrapped by the Baillieu Government.

Announced as part of a $21.9 million package in the 2022/23 Victorian State Budget, Lalor, alongside other stations, will receive accessibility upgrades, the installation of CCTV, and platform shelters. The development process will begin in late 2022 or early 2023, with a timeline for the upgrades to be released once construction has begun.

Lalor station, like the suburb in which it is located, was originally pronounced /ˈlɔːlər/, as it was named after Peter Lalor and, although some people still pronounce it as such, in recent times, the pronunciation /ˈleɪlɔːr, -lər/ has become predominant. In addition, the Victorian Railways Newsletter of 1973, and Victorian RailWays of 1974 (Victorian Railways in-house newsletters) stated that the correct pronunciation was /ˈlɔːlər/.

== Platforms and services ==
Lalor has one island platform with two faces. It is serviced by Metro Trains' Mernda line services.

Lalor platform arrangement
Platform	Line	Destination	Service Type	Source
1	Mernda line	Flinders Street	All stations and limited express services	
2	Mernda line	Mernda	All stations	

== Transport links ==
Kinetic Melbourne operates five bus routes via Lalor station, under contract to Transport Victoria:

- 554 : Thomastown station – Thomastown station (clockwise loop via West Lalor)
- 555 : Pacific Epping – Northland Shopping Centre
- 557 : Thomastown station – Thomastown station (anti-clockwise loop)
- 559 : Thomastown station – Thomastown station (clockwise loop)
- 566 : Lalor – Northland Shopping Centre

== Gallery ==
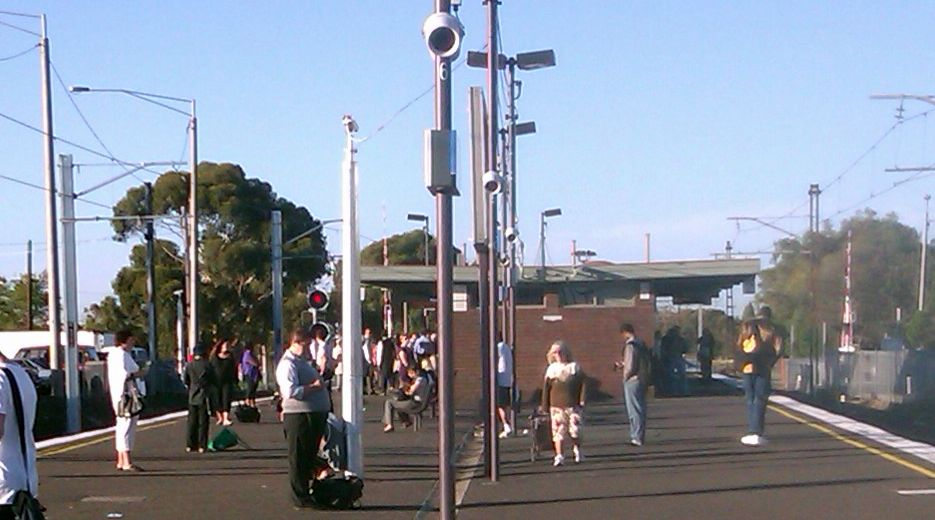
Southbound view from Platform 2, March 2012

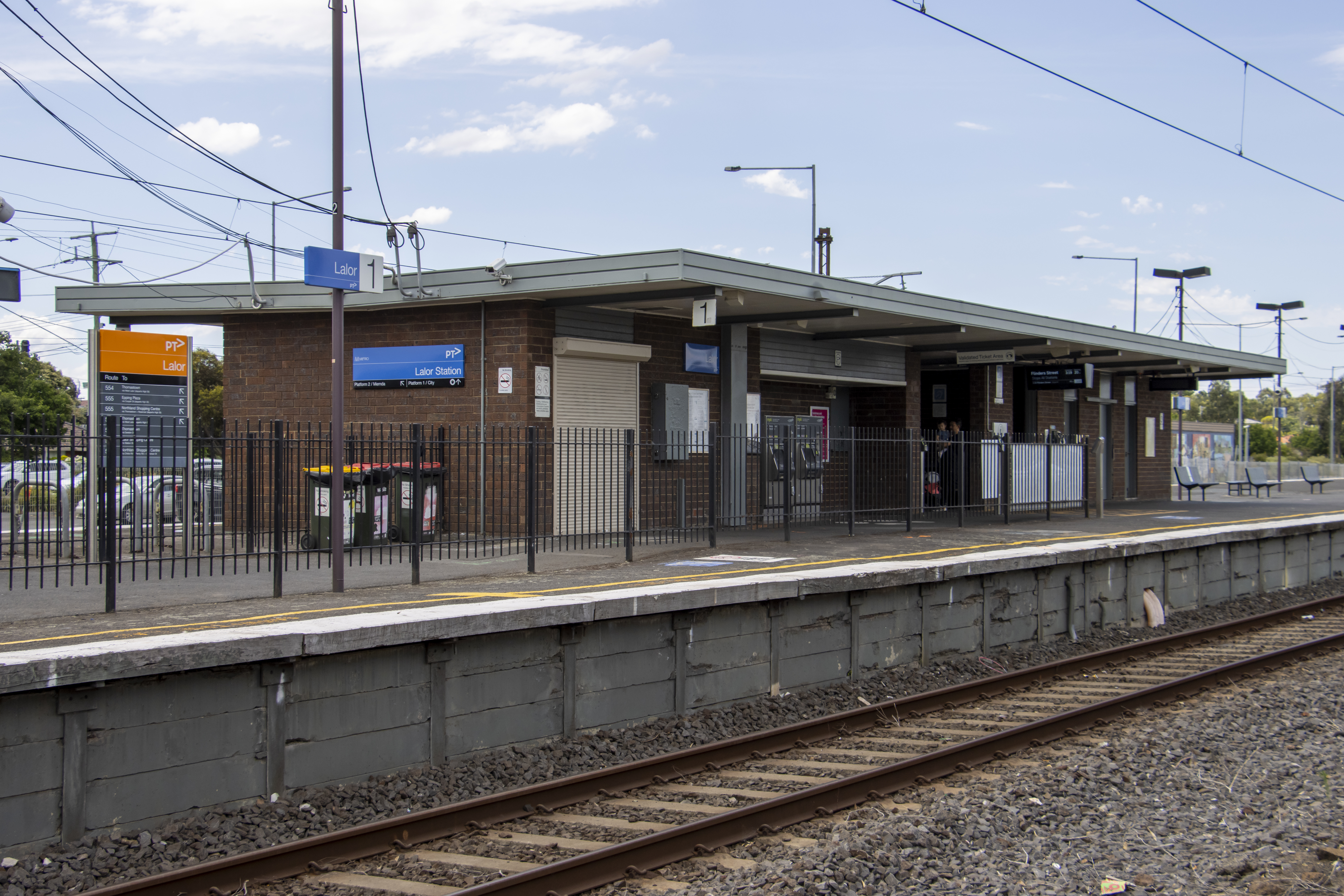
North-west bound view of station building on Platform 1, January 2023

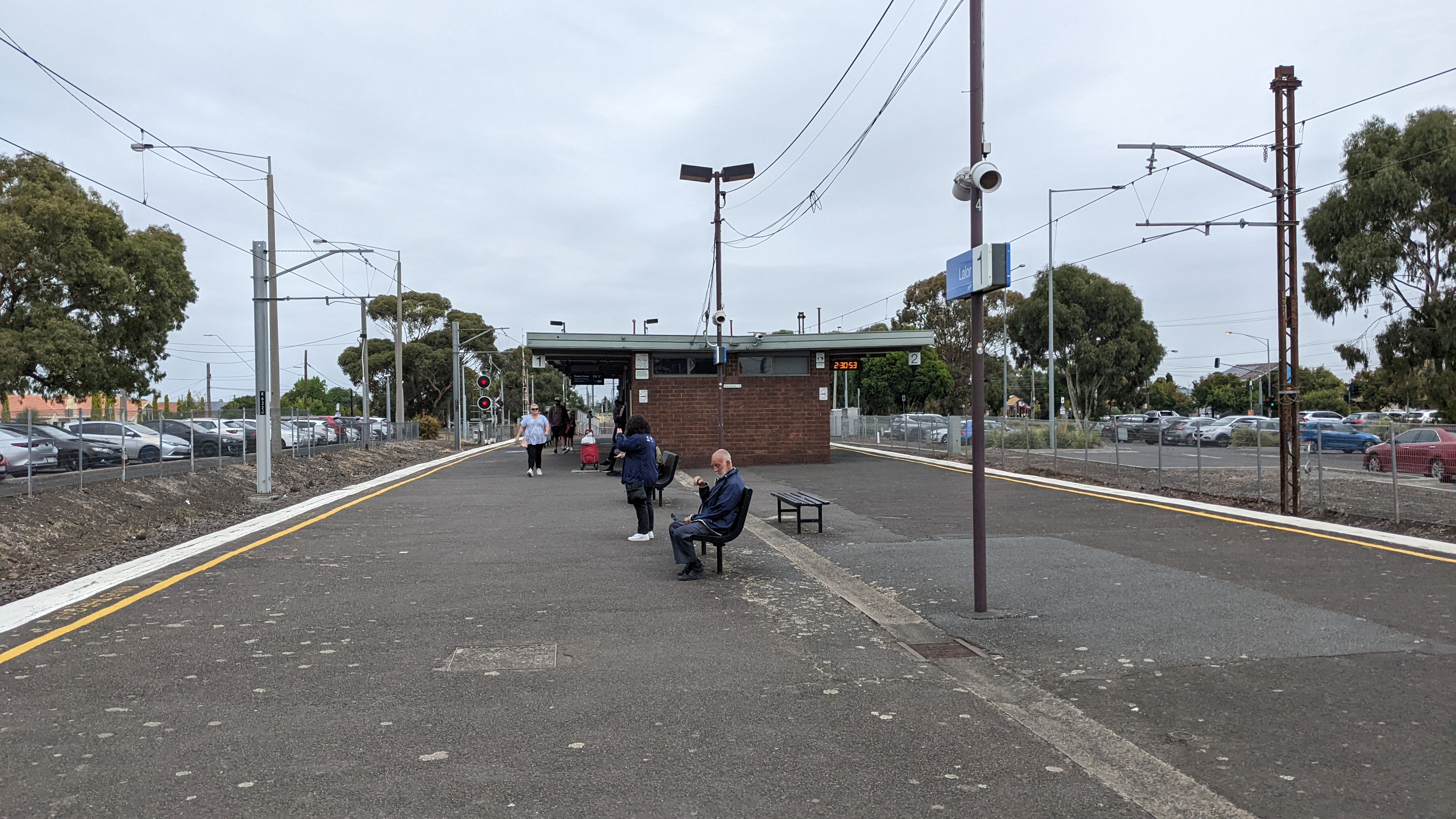
Southbound view from Platform 1, March 2023

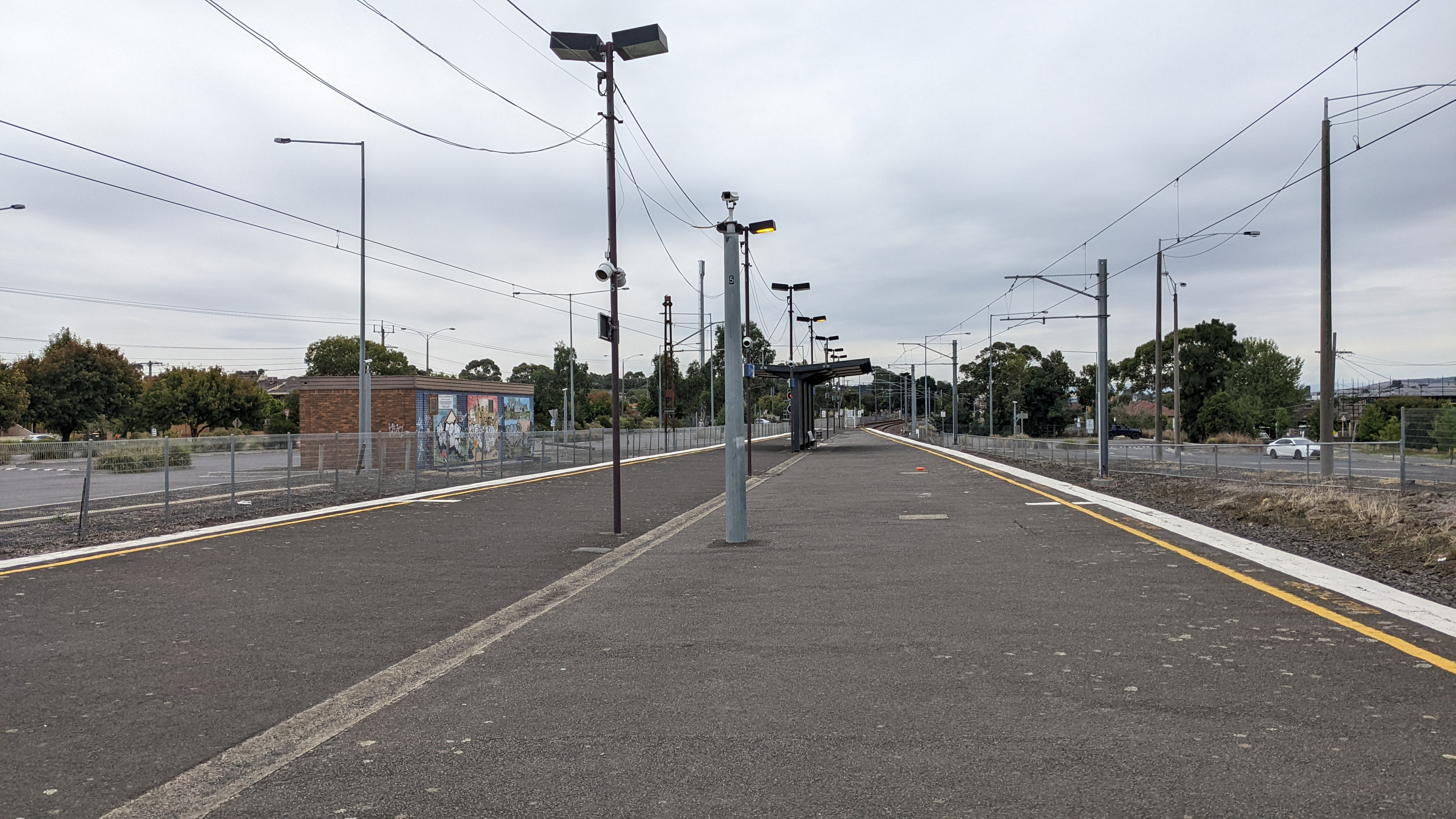
Northbound view from Platform 1, March 2023

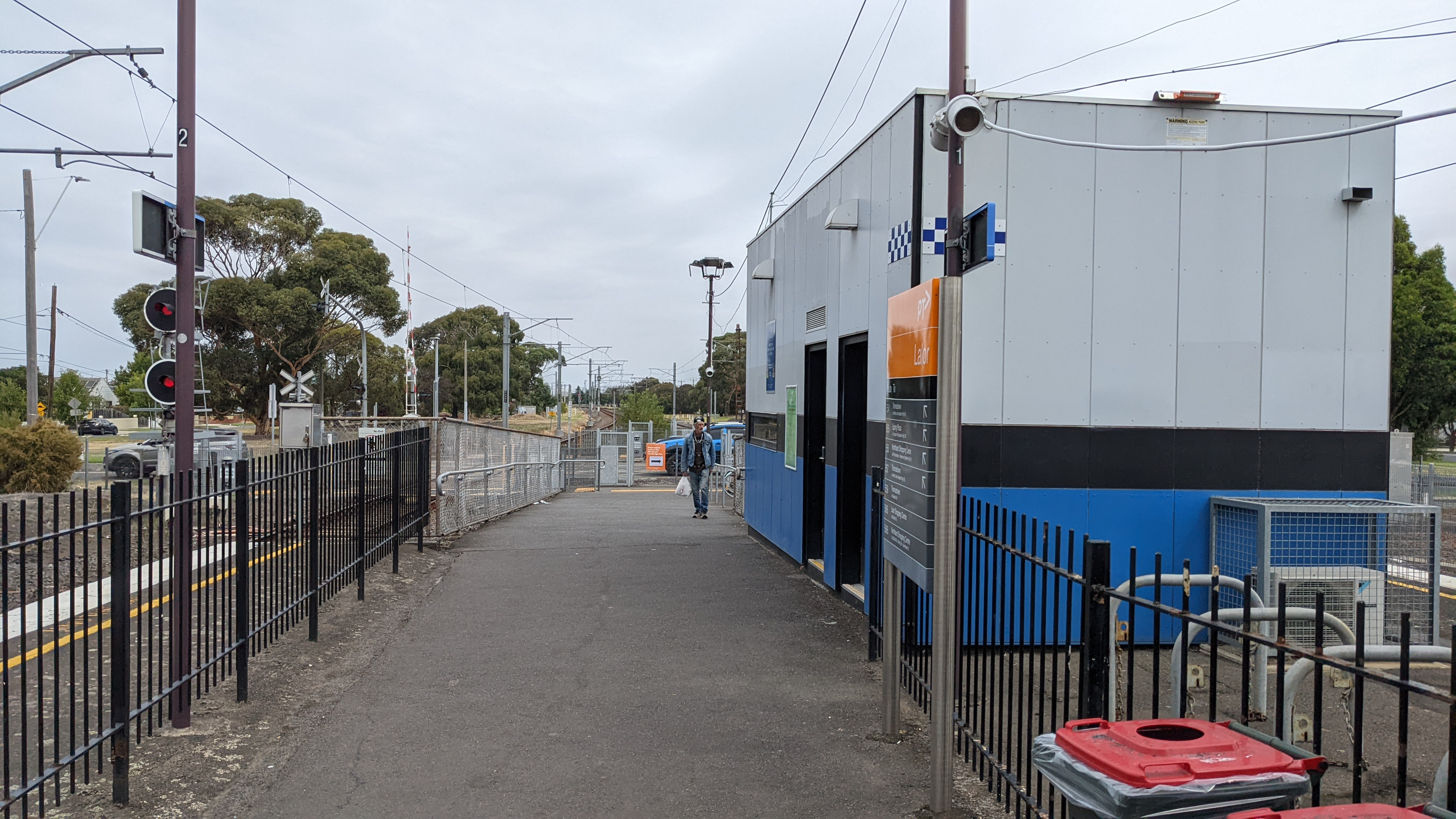
Station PSO Box and entrance and exit ramp, March 2023

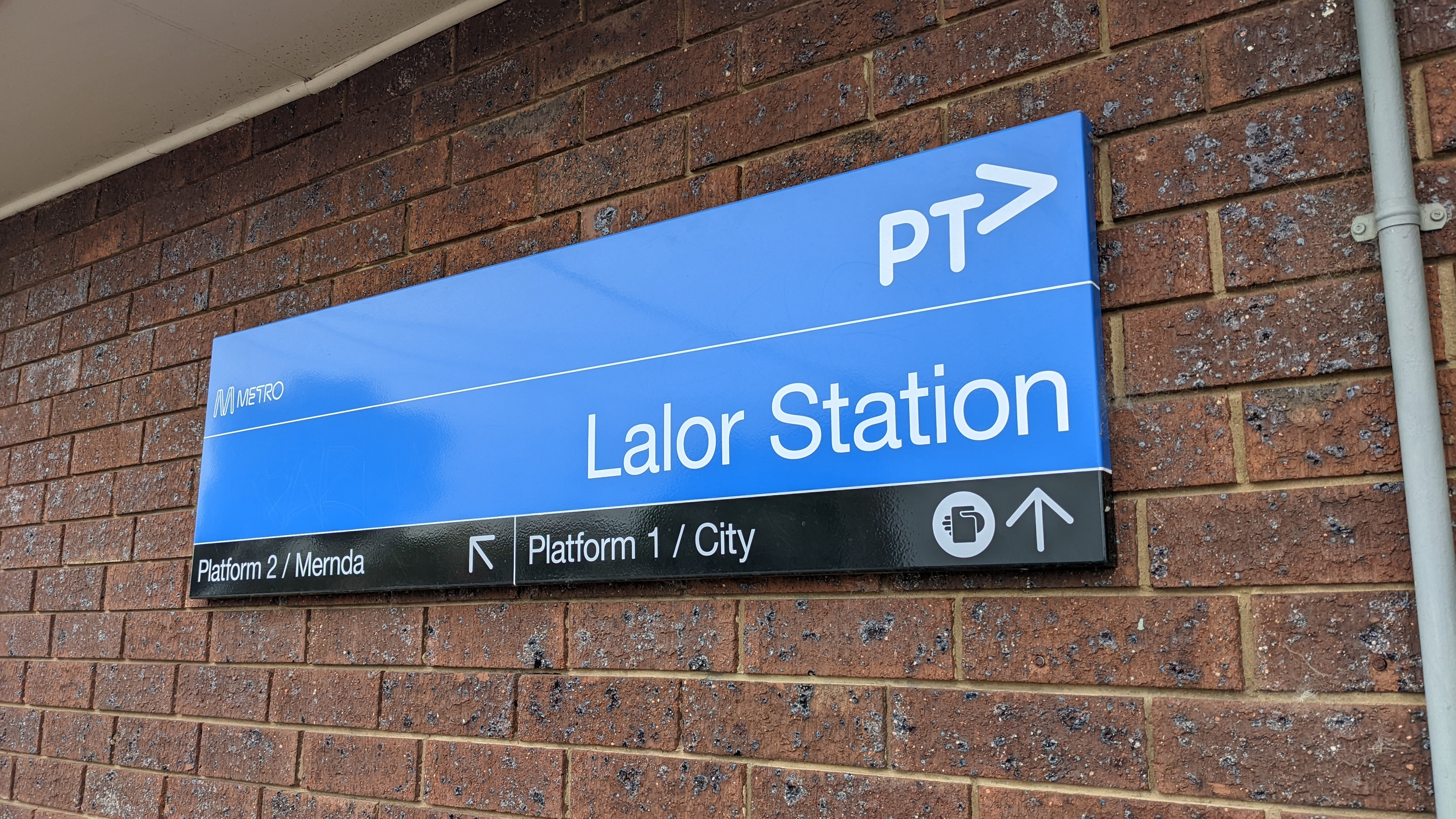
Station entrance signage, March 2023
