= Edinburgh Gardens =

Park in inner Melbourne, Victoria, Australia

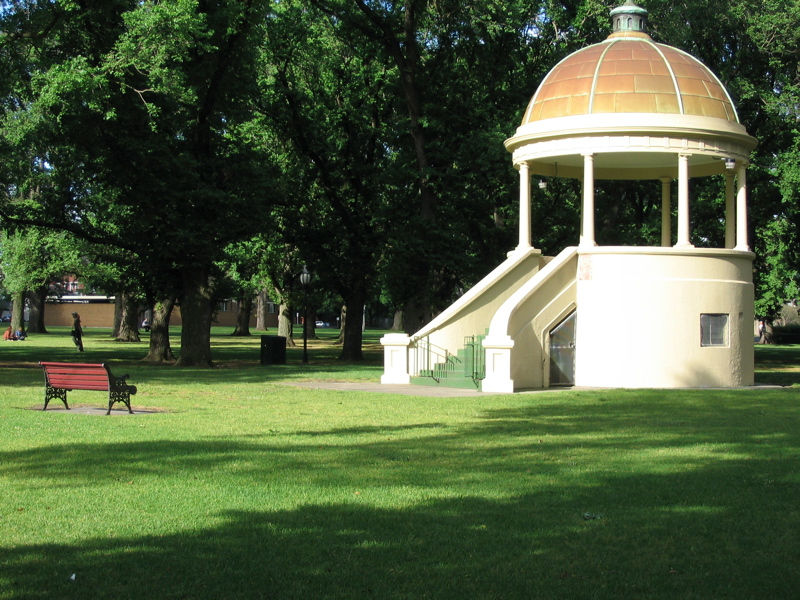
- Fitzroy Memorial Rotunda, erected in 1925

- Location within Melbourne
- Interactive map of Edinburgh Gardens
- Type: Urban park; Sports ground
- Location: Fitzroy North, Melbourne, Victoria, Australia
- Coordinates: 37°47′21″S 144°58′51″E
- Area: 24 ha (59 acres)
- Opened: March 1862; 164 years ago
- Designer: Clement Hodgkinson
- Etymology: Prince Alfred, Duke of Edinburgh
- Owner: Government of Victoria (as Crown land)
- Operator: City of Yarra
- Open: All year
- Status: Open
- Terrain: Flat
- Species: Mature avenues of Elm trees
- Public transit: – Rushall; –, –; – Capital City Trail
- Landmarks: W.T. Peterson Community Oval and Grandstand; pavilion; railway infrastructure (disused); rotunda
- Facilities: Barbecues; basketball court; drinking fountain; lawn bowling and bocce rinks; picnic area and seating; playground; skate park; sports ovals; tennis courts; toilets
- Website: yarracity.vic.gov.au

Register of the National Estate
- Official name: Edinburgh Gardens
- Type: Defunct register
- Designated: 1978(?)
- Reference no.: 18130

Edinburgh Gardens is a 24-hectare (59-acre) urban park and sports ground located in Fitzroy North, an inner suburb of Melbourne, in Victoria, Australia. The park is bounded by Brunswick Street and St Georges Road to the west, the curve of Alfred Crescent to the north and east, and Freeman Street to the south.

Situated on the traditional lads of the Wurundjeri, the park was created from a grant of land in March 1862 and laid out by Clement Hodgkinson, who designed many of Melbourne's inner-city parks and gardens. The park is managed by the City of Yarra and has plenty of open lawns, specimen trees and shaded areas, connected by an extensive network of paths, sporting fields, and is one of the largest parks in the local government area.

The gardens were added to the now defunct Register of the National Estate, possibly in 1978; and were added to the City of Yarra non-statutory local heritage list on an unknown date. Located within the Gardens is the W. T. Peterson Community Oval Grandstand, built in 1888, that was added to the Victorian Heritage Register on 27 June 1990 in recognition of its architectural and historical significance. The W. T. Peterson Community Oval was the former home ground of the Fitzroy Football Club, where games were played from 1883 until the Club vacated the grounds in 1967.

== Etymology ==
The Gardens were named in honour of Prince Alfred, Duke of Edinburgh, following the assassination attempt on his life during his visit to Australia on 12 March 1868.

== History ==
The park is located on the traditional lands of the Wurundjeri.

=== Colonial establishment ===
Following Colonial settlement, in January 1862 the newly-formed City of Fitzroy requested, for public recreation, access to 20 hectares (50 acres) of Crown land that had earlier been set aside as a reserve. This site, containing swamp lands and billabongs, was rejected by the Crown. Under the direction of Clement Hodgkinson, a smaller site was offered that now comprises part of the Edinburgh Gardens, and it was temporarily gazetted as a public park in March 1862. Two cricket clubs were granted access to 6 hectares (15 acres) of adjoining land, made subsequent improvements to those lands, and later became part of the Gardens. On 24 October 1881 the land was permanently reserved as a public park, with additional land added in June 1883.

Sporting clubs for both cricket and Australian rules football were established from the 1850s. In 1872, the Fitzroy Cricket Club was formed from the amalgamation of the Collingwood Commercial Cricket Club and the Prince of Wales Cricket Club, with the oval at Edinburgh Gardens their home field. On 26 September 1883, the Mayor of Fitzroy chaired a meeting to form the Fitzroy Football Club, and negotiated with the cricket club to share the Edinburgh Gardens' oval. The first game on the oval was between Melbourne and Carlton football clubs. A lawn bowling rink was established in the Gardens in 1877 and a tennis club in 1888. (Note: Although, the Fitzroy Tennis Club was not established until 1894.) In the same year, the heritage-listed W. T. Peterson Community Oval Grandstand was completed.

Layout of the network of paths, tree planting, and gardens in the park commenced from 1883. However, they were curtailed in 1888 when plans for the construction of the Fitzroy spur line, part of the Inner Circle railway line, dissected the park. A short-lived passenger service ran on a single-track branch from North Fitzroy south through the Gardens, and terminated on the north side of Queens Parade. The passenger service was discontinued in May 1892; however, the spur line continued to operate through the Gardens as a goods line.

=== 20th-century developments ===
Further plantings were made in the early part of the 20th century, initially to create a plant screen of the railway line. A statue of Queen Victoria was erected in c. 1902, (Note: No longer extant.) and an ornamental pond, caretakers cottage, and a second grandstand after the Fitzroy FC won three consecutive Victorian Football League premierships from 1898 to 1900. A pavilion for the bowling club was erected in 1913 and a number of smaller structures, including a tennis club pavilion, entrance pavilions, and a gymnasium wee completed around this time.

Managed initially by the Melbourne and Metropolitan Board of Works, the park was transferred to the City of Fitzroy in October 1917. Two war memorials were erected following World War I: a late Edwardian concrete arbour in 1919 – 4 metres (13 ft) high, 8 metres (26 ft) wide, and 4 metres (13 ft) deep, dedicated to the memory of the seven Fitzroy players who lost their lives in the War; – and an Inter-War Classical Revival band rotunda in 1925. A children's playground was completed in the same year and an ornate polished granite drinking fountain in 1920.

With growing crowds and increased demand for improved spectator access, and various thwarted plans to expand facilities, the Fitzroy Football Club vacated the Gardens in 1967. The cricket ground started to fall into neglect and, in 1977, the 1905 grandstand was destroyed by fire. The unsightly railway line was closed in 1981 and the former tracks were converted to a bicycle and pedestrian pathway. Most of the railway infrastructure was removed or converted to other uses, including public housing. Around the same time, the 1888 grandstand was restored and a 1992 plan by the Fitzroy FC to return to the ground was abandoned after local residents' opposition.

=== 21st-century developments ===
The City of Yarra planned to build a community hub and library in the park; however, this was rejected in 2008 after the Victorian Government ruled that it was inconsistent with the 1881 Crown land reservation. Following repeated vandalism of a 1993 memorial statue of James Cook, in May 2025 the Council resolved to permanently remove the statue.

The City of Yarra Council approved a revised plan for further improvements in December 2024, including the addition of two extra courts and a new clubhouse, necessitating the removal of three of the park's 1880s-era elm trees. The staged project also proposed a new two-storey pavilion for the Brunswick Street Oval and improvements to the heritage-listed grandstand. The proposed removal of trees generated opposition from local residents. In May 2026, work began on the project, expected to be completed in 2027; funded by the Victorian Government ($24 million), the City of Yarra ($3.58 million) and the Australian Football League and Cricket Australia ($100,000 each).

== Description ==
The park is unique due not only to the size, but also the strange features, and unusual history of the reserve.

A centrepiece of the park is a pedestal plinth designed to hold a large wooden statue of Queen Victoria, that was erected in 1901. However, the statue disappeared from the gardens after just three years and was never replaced. Since 2016, the plinth has been used to display temporary installations of public art, that change every eighteen months.

=== Remnant railway infrastructure ===
A spur of the former Inner Circle railway line bisected the gardens between 1888 and 1981. The Fitzroy spur diverged from the line along Park Street, followed Mark Street across Alfred Crescent and finished at the former Fitzroy station, located behind Brunswick Street Oval. This passenger service was never viable, and was closed only a few years after being built. The area was then used as a freight yard until the 1980s.

Some sections of the old track are still visible through the park. Level crossings were retained when the tracks were removed. The old line has been replaced with a shared path that joins the Linear Park Reserve and leads to the nearby Capital City Trail. Former factories associated with the line were demolished and the land either returned to the Edinburgh Gardens or sold. A timber pedestrian bridge remained in the south-west of the Gardens until c. 2003, when it was sold and removed to make way for a low-rise public housing development for the Office of Housing.

=== W. T. Peterson Community Oval and grandstand ===
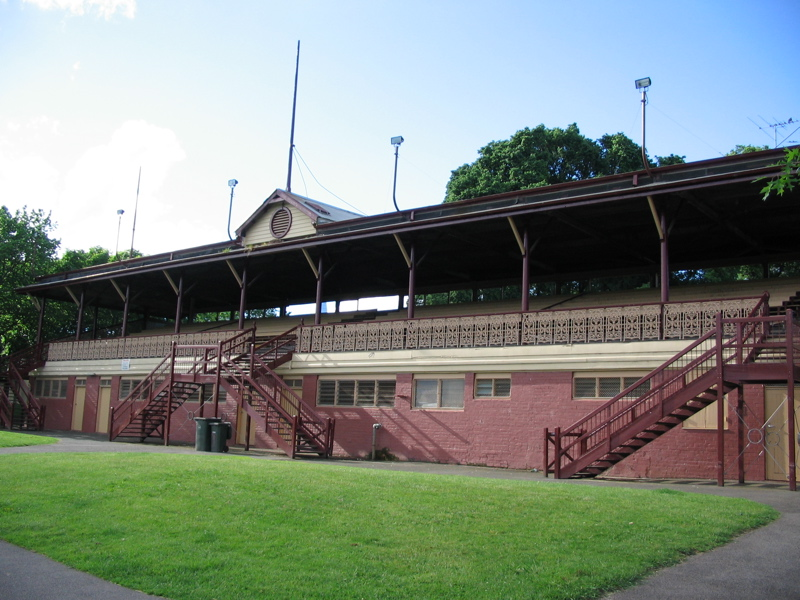
The grandstand at the W. T. Peterson Community Oval, built 1888

An Australian rules football and cricket oval is located at the south-western corner of the gardens, and named in honour of W. T. Peterson, who served on the Fitzroy City Council for 21 years. The oval is better known to generations of Fitzroy Football Club supporters as the Brunswick Street Oval and has a capacity of approximately 15,000 spectators. It served as Fitzroy FC's home ground in the VFA competition, and later the VFL competition from 1883 until 1966. The last game played there by Fitzroy was in August 1966 when they played St Kilda.

The ground is now used by the re-vamped Fitzroy Football Club (Note: For the club's history, post 1989, refer to the proposed mergers and relocations of the Fitzroy Football Club and the merger with the Fitzroy Reds.) playing in the VAFA and the Fitzroy Junior Football Club in the YJFL, and it is considered the spiritual home ground of Fitzroy FC. The playing ground is now framed by the remaining original features of the oval: the visiting members gate structure at the corner Freeman and Brunswick Streets, an 1888 heritage-listed grandstand, gates, and a ticket box on the opposite side of the oval. The grandstand was added to the Victorian Heritage Register in 1990.

The ground record crowd for Brunswick Street Oval was set on 6 May 1935 when 36,000 fans saw Fitzroy draw with Collingwood. Both sides scored 14 goals and 9 behinds and were deadlocked on 93 points.

== In popular culture ==
The war memorial rotunda to the west of the Gardens is the centrepiece of the Melbourne indie-rock band The Lucksmiths song "Under The Rotunda".

== See also ==
- Brunswick Street Oval
- Parks and gardens of Melbourne
- Heritage gardens in Australia
- List of heritage-listed buildings in Melbourne
