= Northcote railway station =

Railway station in Melbourne, Australia

Northcote
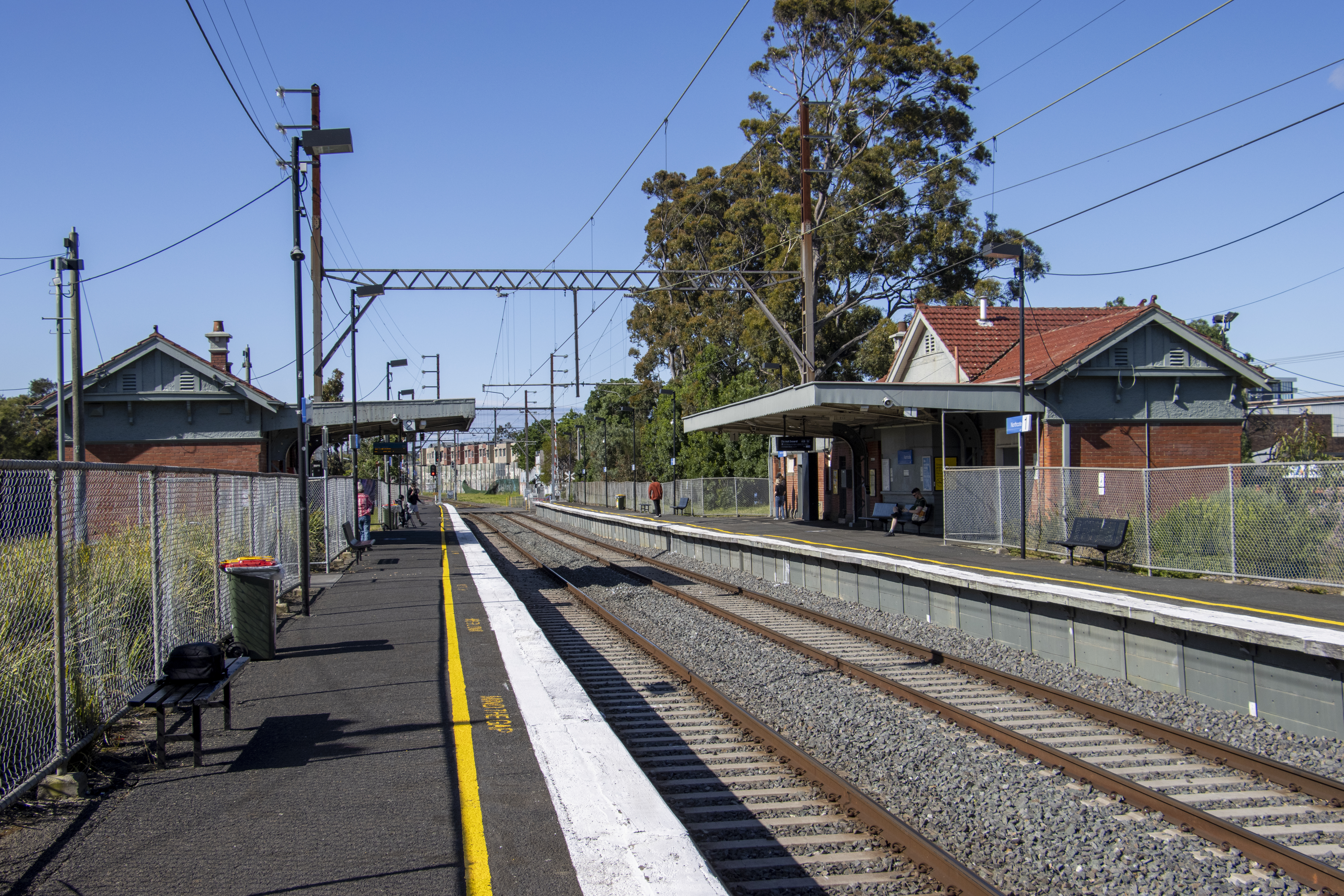
- Northbound view from Platform 2, November 2022

General information
- Location: Herbert Street, Northcote, Victoria 3070; City of Darebin; Australia
- Coordinates: 37°46′11″S 144°59′41″E
- System: PTV commuter rail station
- Owner: VicTrack
- Operator: Metro Trains
- Line: Mernda
- Distance: 8.97 kilometres from Southern Cross
- Platforms: 2 side
- Tracks: 2
- Connections: Bus; Tram

Construction
- Structure type: Ground
- Parking: 5
- Cycle facilities: Yes
- Accessible: Yes—step free access

Other information
- Status: Operational, unstaffed
- Station code: NCE
- Fare zone: Myki zone 1
- Website: Public Transport Victoria

History
- Opened: 8 October 1889; 137 years ago
- Electrified: July 1921 (1500 V DC overhead)
- Former names: Middle Northcote (1889-1906)

Passengers
- 2005–2006: 288,958
- 2006–2007: 327,813 ▲13.44%
- 2007–2008: 352,563 ▲7.55%
- 2008–2009: 368,597 ▲4.54%
- 2009–2010: 404,749 ▲9.8%
- 2010–2011: 376,031 ▼7.1%
- 2011–2012: 383,902 ▲2.09%
- 2012–2013: Not measured
- 2013–2014: 326,914 ▼14.84%
- 2014–2015: 344,425 ▲5.35%
- 2015–2016: 352,727 ▲2.41%
- 2016–2017: 369,539 ▲4.77%
- 2017–2018: 413,979 ▲12.03%
- 2018–2019: 400,750 ▼3.19%
- 2019–2020: 308,200 ▼23.1%
- 2020–2021: 151,500 ▼50.84%
- 2021–2022: 150,400 ▼0.72%

Services
Preceding station	Metro Trains	Following station
Merri towards Flinders Street	Mernda line	Croxton towards Mernda
Track layout
Location

Northcote station is a railway station operated by Metro Trains Melbourne on the Mernda line, which is part of the Melbourne rail network. It serves the north-eastern suburb of Northcote, in Melbourne, Victoria, Australia. Northcote station is a ground level unstaffed station, featuring two side platforms. It opened on 8 October 1889.

Initially opened as Middle Northcote, the station was given its current name of Northcote on 10 December 1906.

== History ==
Northcote station opened on 8 October 1889, when the Inner Circle line was extended from North Fitzroy to Reservoir. Like the suburb itself, the station is believed to be named after Stafford Henry Northcote, who was British Chancellor of the Exchequer between 1874 and 1880, Foreign Secretary between 1885 and 1886, and a co-author of the Northcote–Trevelyan Report in 1853.

In 1973, both platforms were extended at the down end of the station.

In 1986, the former goods sidings, located at the down end of the station, were abolished. A crossover, also located at the down end, was spiked out of use around that time, and was removed at a later date.

During October 1987, the double line block system between Northcote – Merri and Northcote – Thornbury was abolished, and replaced with three position signalling. Also occurring in that year, boom barriers replaced interlocked gates at the Arthurton Road level crossing, located at the down end of the station. The signal box for the level crossing was also abolished during that time.

As part of the 2010/11 State Budget, $83.7 million was allocated to upgrade Northcote to a premium station, along with nineteen others. However, in March 2011, this was scrapped by the Baillieu Government.

On 10 May 2026, the Victorian Government announced that Northcote station, alongside four other stations in Victoria would be getting safety and accessibility upgrades as part of the 2026/27 $7.6 million State Budget. This includes installation of tactile boarding indicators on the platform surface and other safety and accessibility upgrades.

== Platforms and services ==
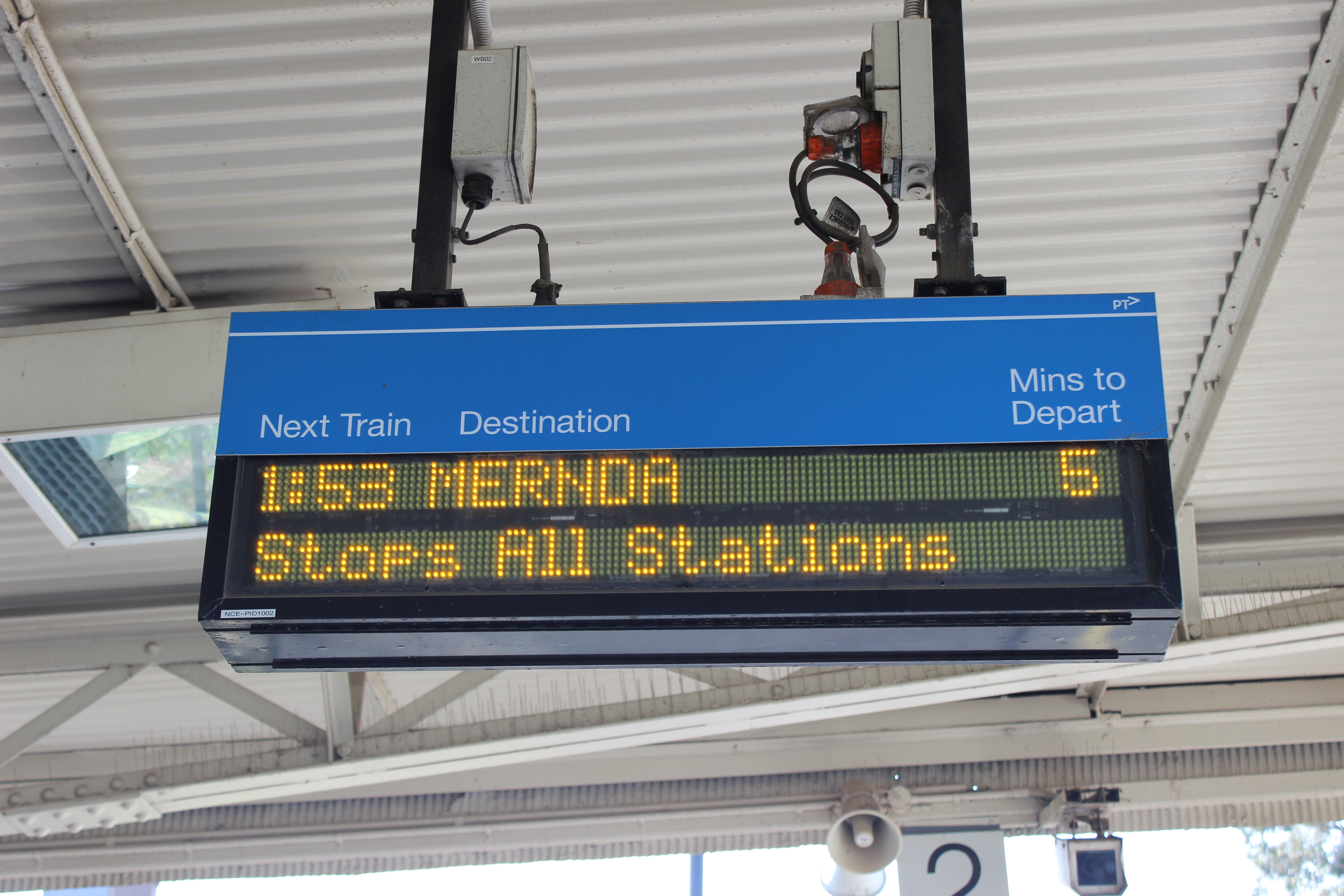
A PID on Platform 2 displaying a Mernda service, August 2018

Northcote has two side platforms. It is served by Mernda line trains.

Northcote platform arrangement
Platform	Line	Destination	Service Type	Source
1	Mernda line	Flinders Street	All stations and limited express services	
2	Mernda line	Mernda	All stations	

== Transport links ==
Kinetic Melbourne operates one bus route via Northcote station, under contract to Transport Victoria:

- 508 : Alphington station – Moonee Ponds Junction

Yarra Trams operates two routes via Northcote station:

- : West Preston – Victoria Harbour (Docklands)
- : Bundoora RMIT – Waterfront City (Docklands)

== Gallery ==
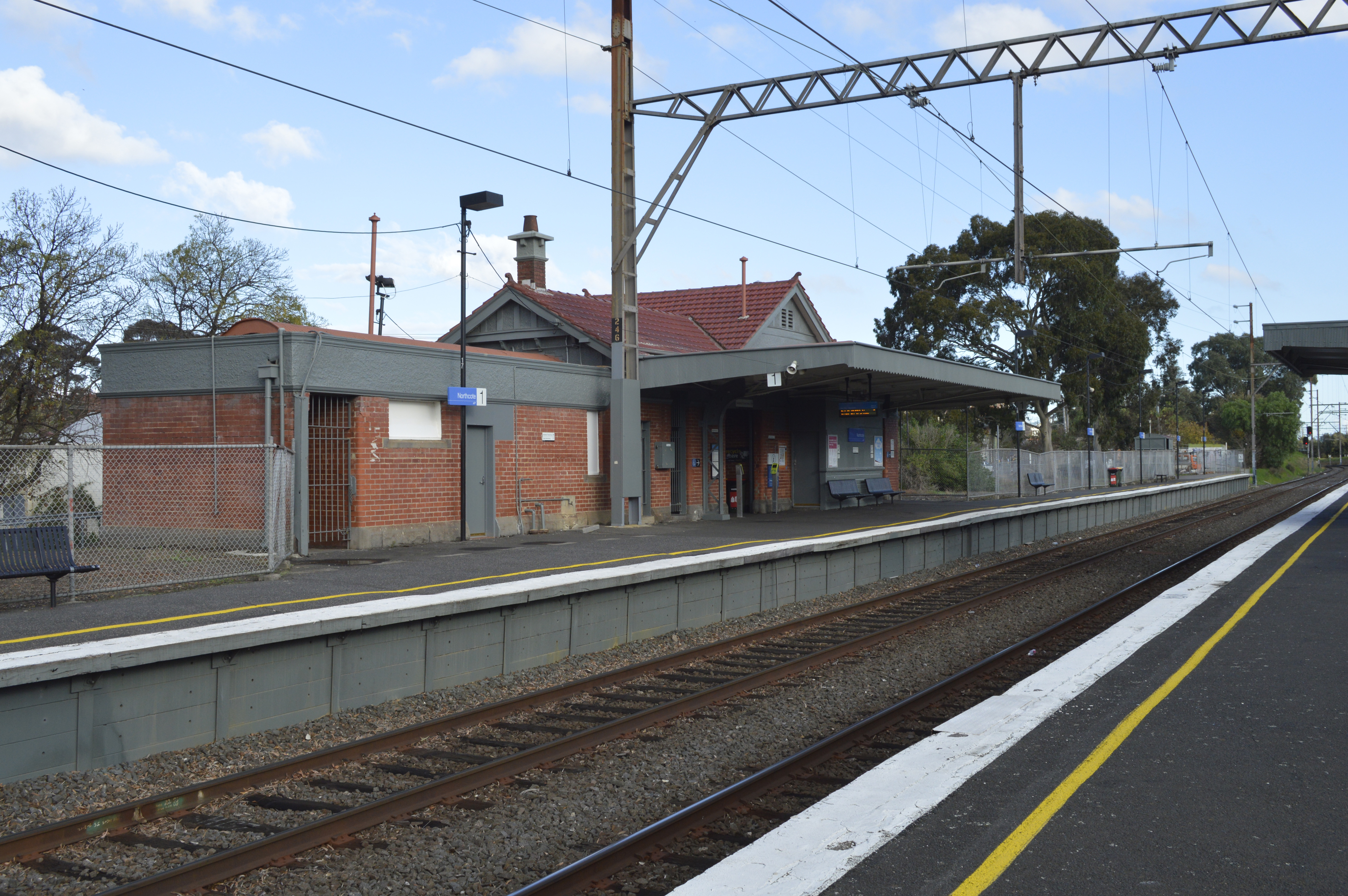
Southbound view from Platform 2 looking at station building on Platform 1, May 2014

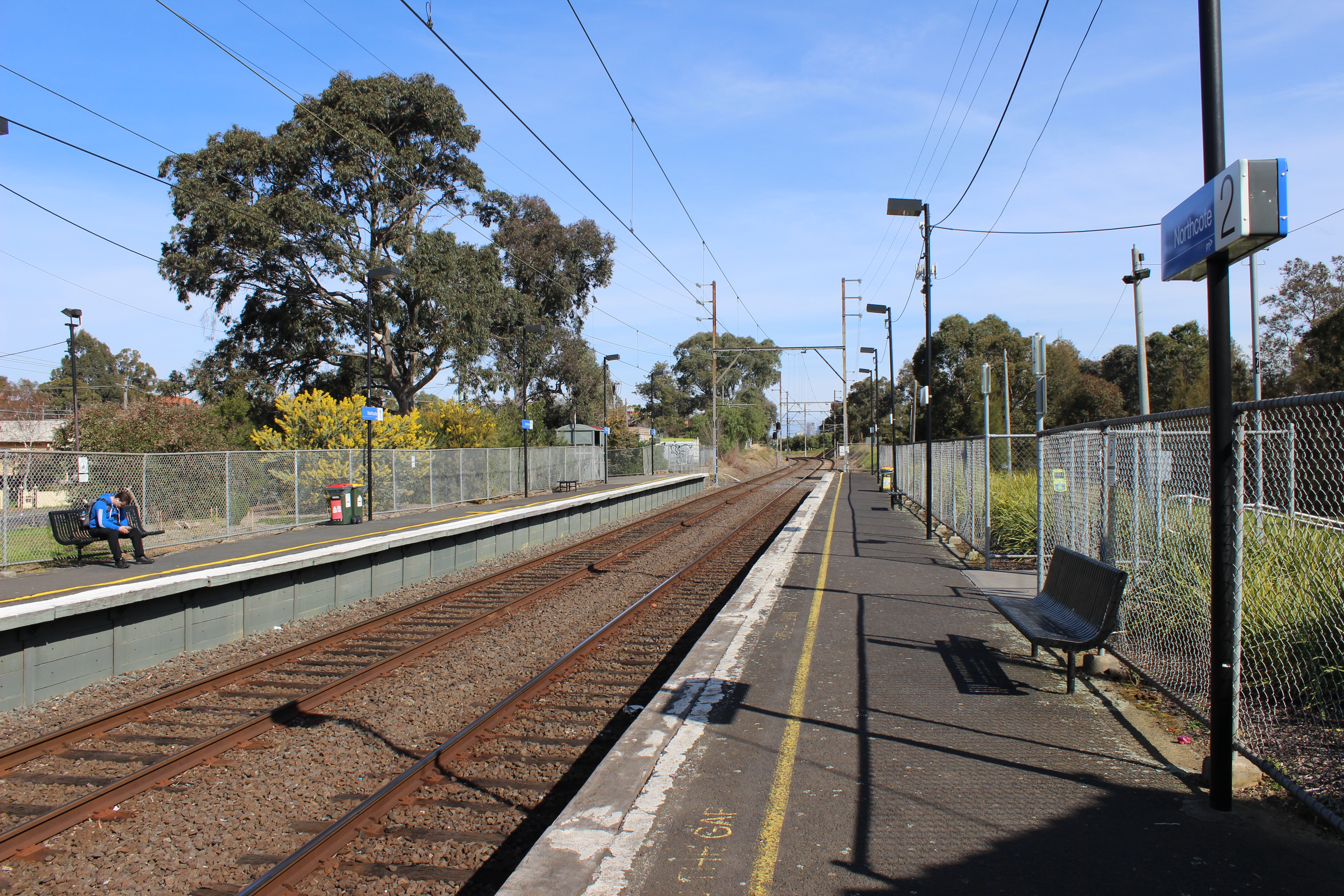
Southbound view from Platform 2, August 2018

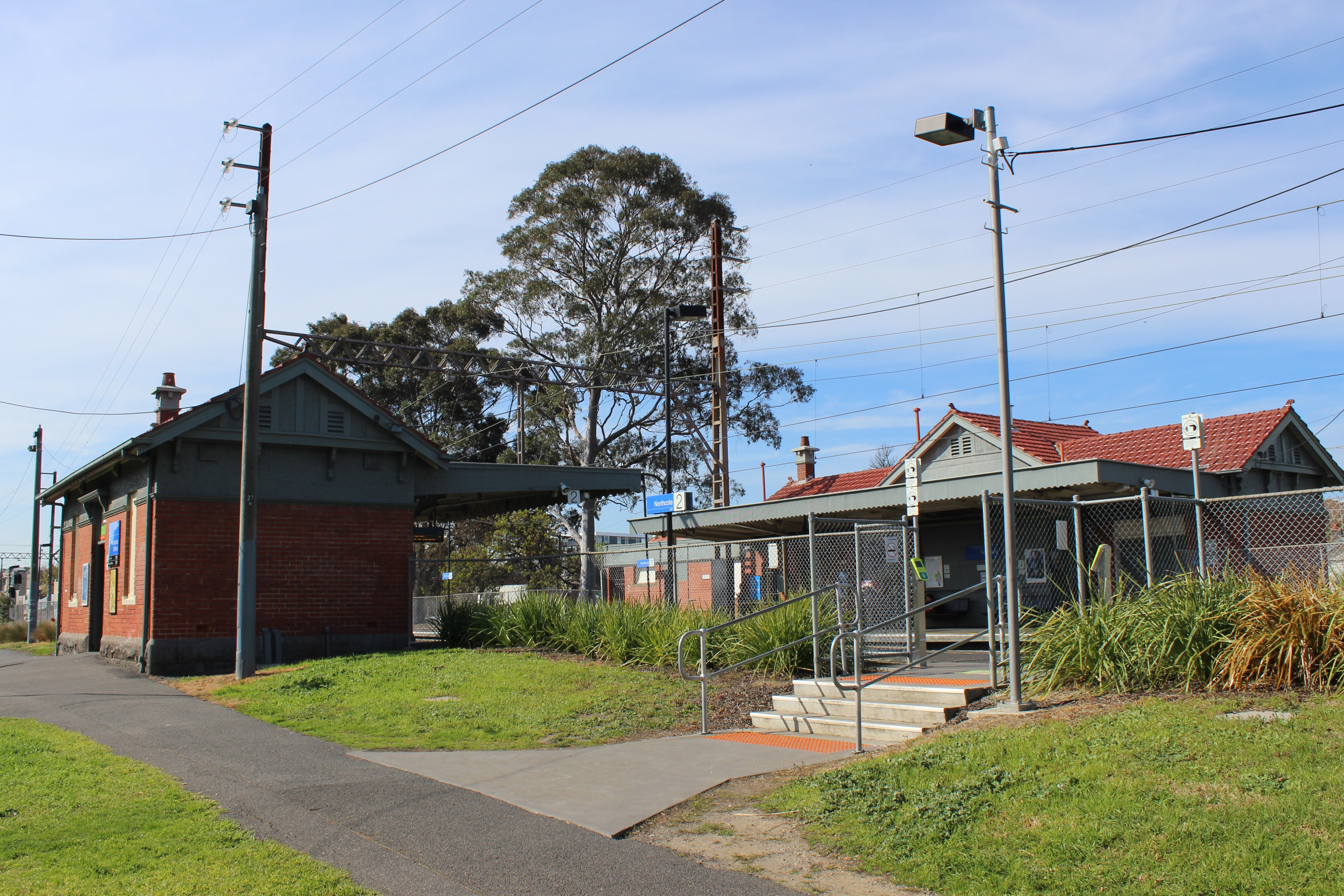
Western entrance and building to Platform 2, August 2018

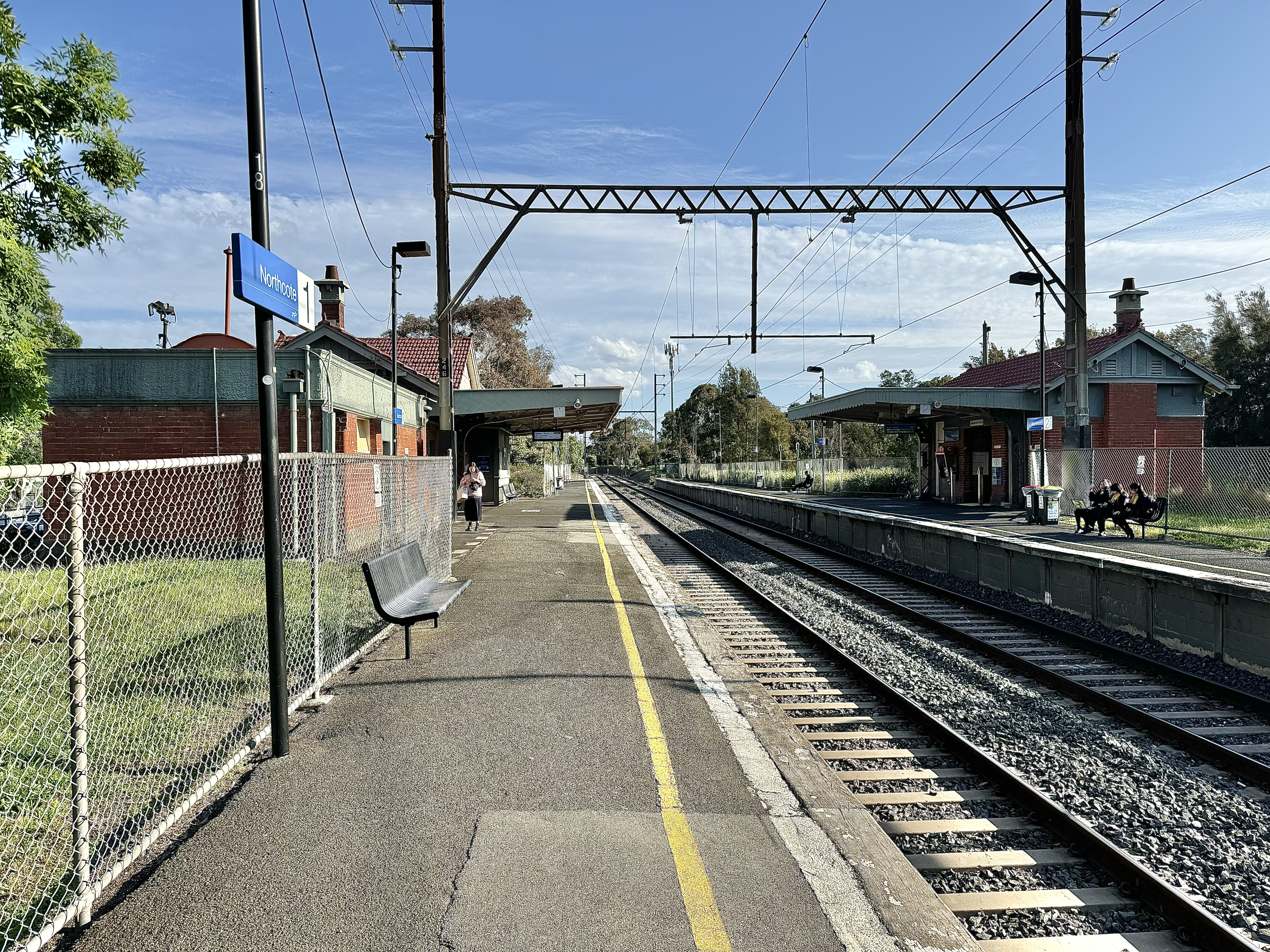
Southbound view from Platform 1,
September 2024

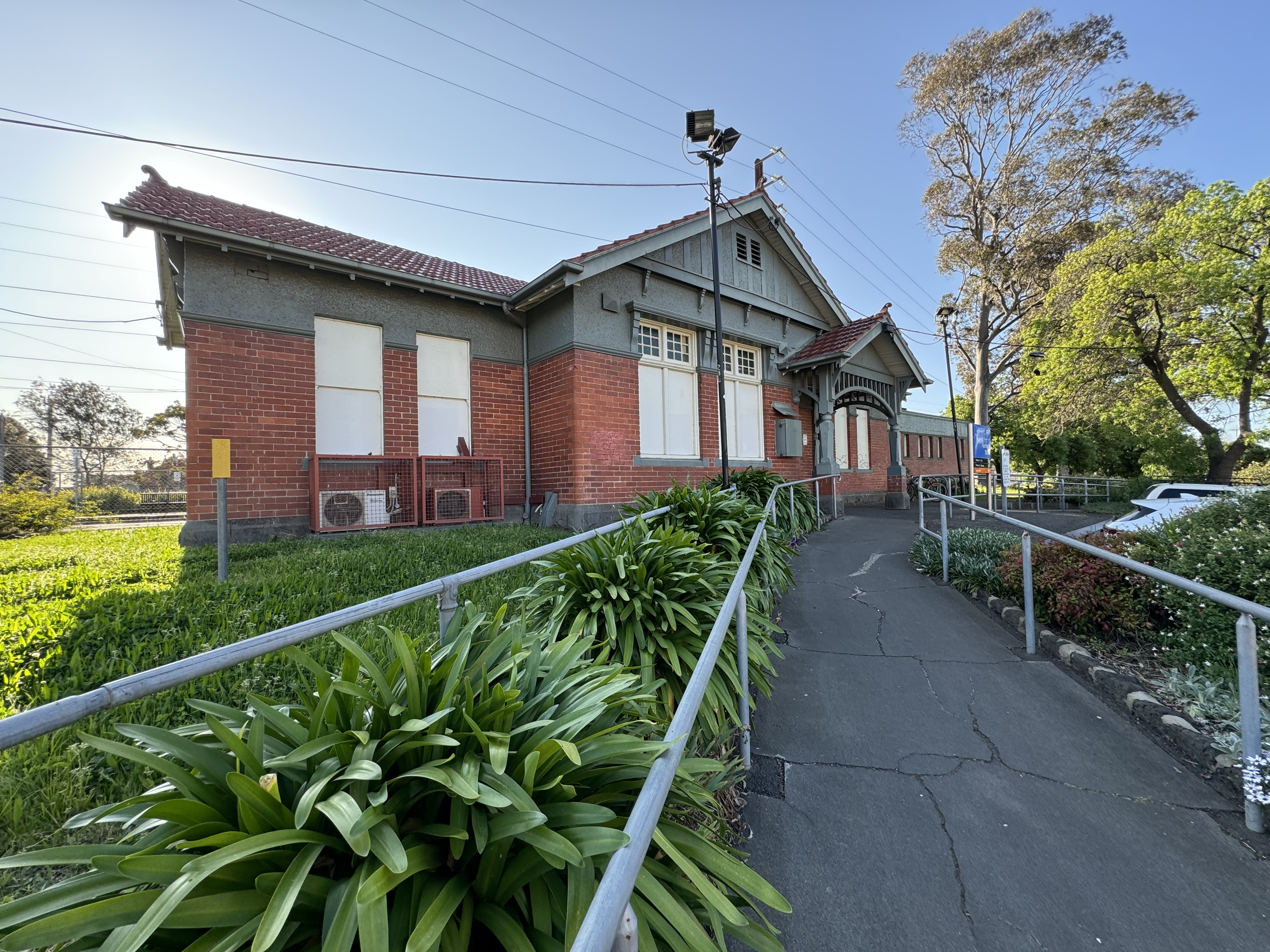
Station building and entrance to Platform 1, September 2024
