= Royal Park railway station =

Railway station in Melbourne, Australia

Royal Park
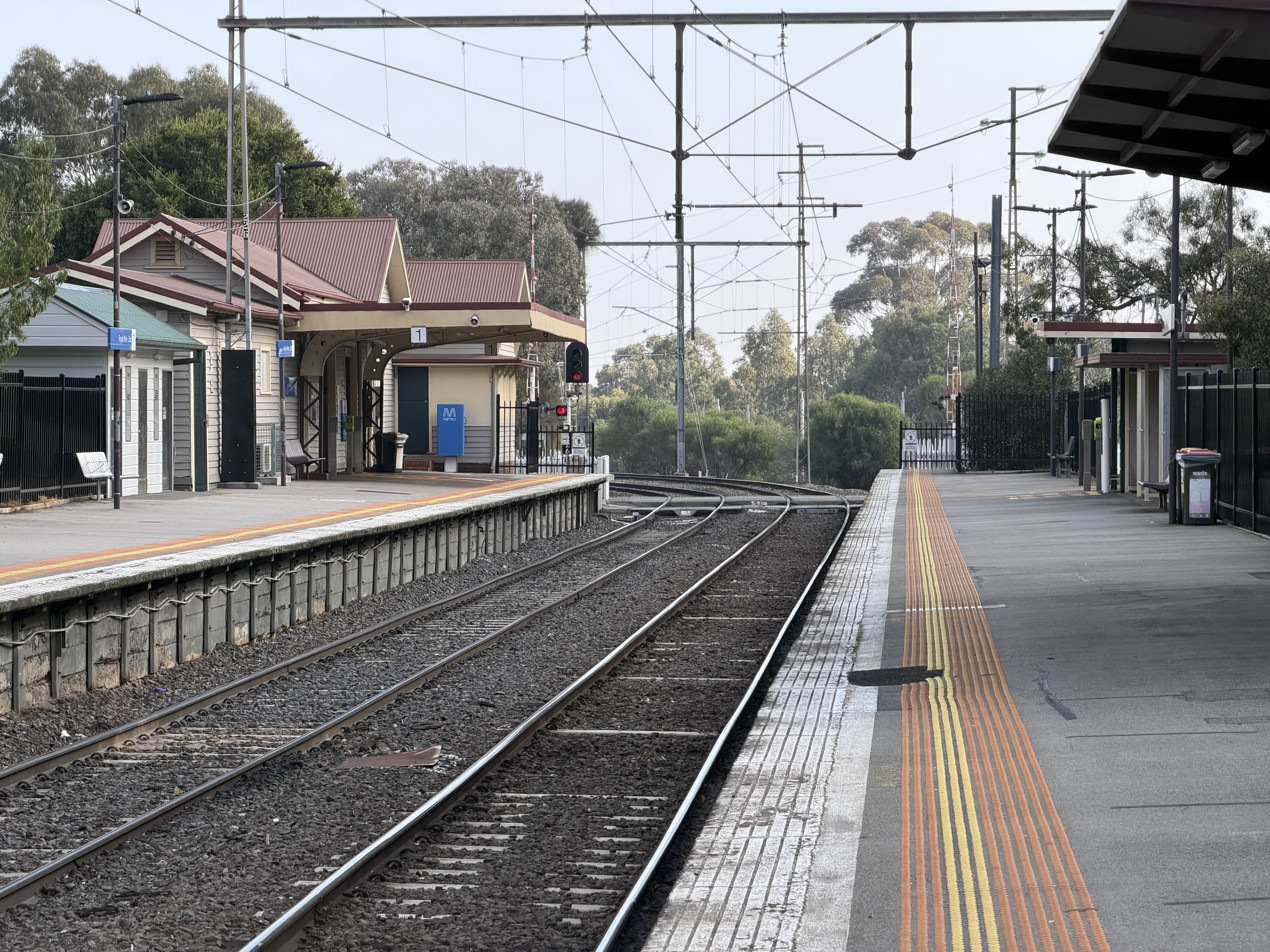
- Westbound view from Platform 2, June 2026

General information
- Other names: Royal Park – Zoo
- Location: Poplar Road, Parkville, Victoria 3052; City of Melbourne; Australia
- Coordinates: 37°46′53″S 144°57′06″E
- System: PTV commuter rail station
- Owner: VicTrack
- Operator: Metro Trains
- Line: Upfield
- Distance: 5.46 kilometres from Southern Cross
- Platforms: 2 side
- Tracks: 2
- Connections: Bus; Tram

Construction
- Structure type: Ground
- Accessible: Yes—step free access

Other information
- Status: Operational, unstaffed
- Station code: RPK
- Fare zone: Myki zone 1
- Website: Public Transport Victoria

History
- Opened: 9 September 1884; 142 years ago
- Electrified: December 1920 (1500 V DC overhead)

Passengers
- 2005–2006: 177,600
- 2006–2007: 210,077 ▲18.28%
- 2007–2008: 243,256 ▲15.79%
- 2008–2009: 296,238 ▲21.78%
- 2009–2010: 297,410 ▲0.39%
- 2010–2011: 290,675 ▼2.26%
- 2011–2012: 313,084 ▲7.71%
- 2012–2013: Not measured
- 2013–2014: 307,711 ▼1.71%
- 2014–2015: 315,380 ▲2.49%
- 2015–2016: 312,245 ▼0.99%
- 2016–2017: 339,226 ▲8.64%
- 2017–2018: 337,560 ▼0.49%
- 2018–2019: 357,050 ▲5.77%
- 2019–2020: 269,450 ▼24.53%
- 2020–2021: 117,850 ▼56.3%
- 2021–2022: 156,050 ▲32.41%

Services
Preceding station	Metro Trains	Following station
Flemington Bridge towards Flinders Street	Upfield line	Jewell towards Upfield
Former services
Preceding station	Disused railways	Following station
Junction	Inner Circle line	North Carlton
	List of closed railway stations in Melbourne	
Track layout
Location

Royal Park station is a railway station operated by Metro Trains Melbourne on the Upfield line, part of the Melbourne railway network. It serves the northern suburb of Parkville in Melbourne, Victoria, Australia. Royal Park station is a ground-level unstaffed station, featuring two side platforms. It opened on 9 September 1884.

It is located within Royal Park, and is the nearest train station to Melbourne Zoo. A disused signal box is located at the up end of Platform 1. It connects to the Route 58 tram, which also serves the Zoo.

== History ==
Royal Park station opened on 9 September 1884, when the railway line was extended from North Melbourne to Coburg. The original plan for the route of the line through Royal Park was to be east of the Zoological Gardens, but after local protests against the destruction of the park, a decision was made to build the line to the west for "reasons of economy". On opening, only temporary station buildings were provided, along with a signal box and gatekeepers cottage.

On 8 May 1888, Royal Park became a junction, with the opening of the Inner Circle line, to both Clifton Hill and Northcote. At the same time, a timber station building and station masters residence were erected. Between 1889 and 1912, there was a goods siding near the station, named Royal Park Cutting Siding.

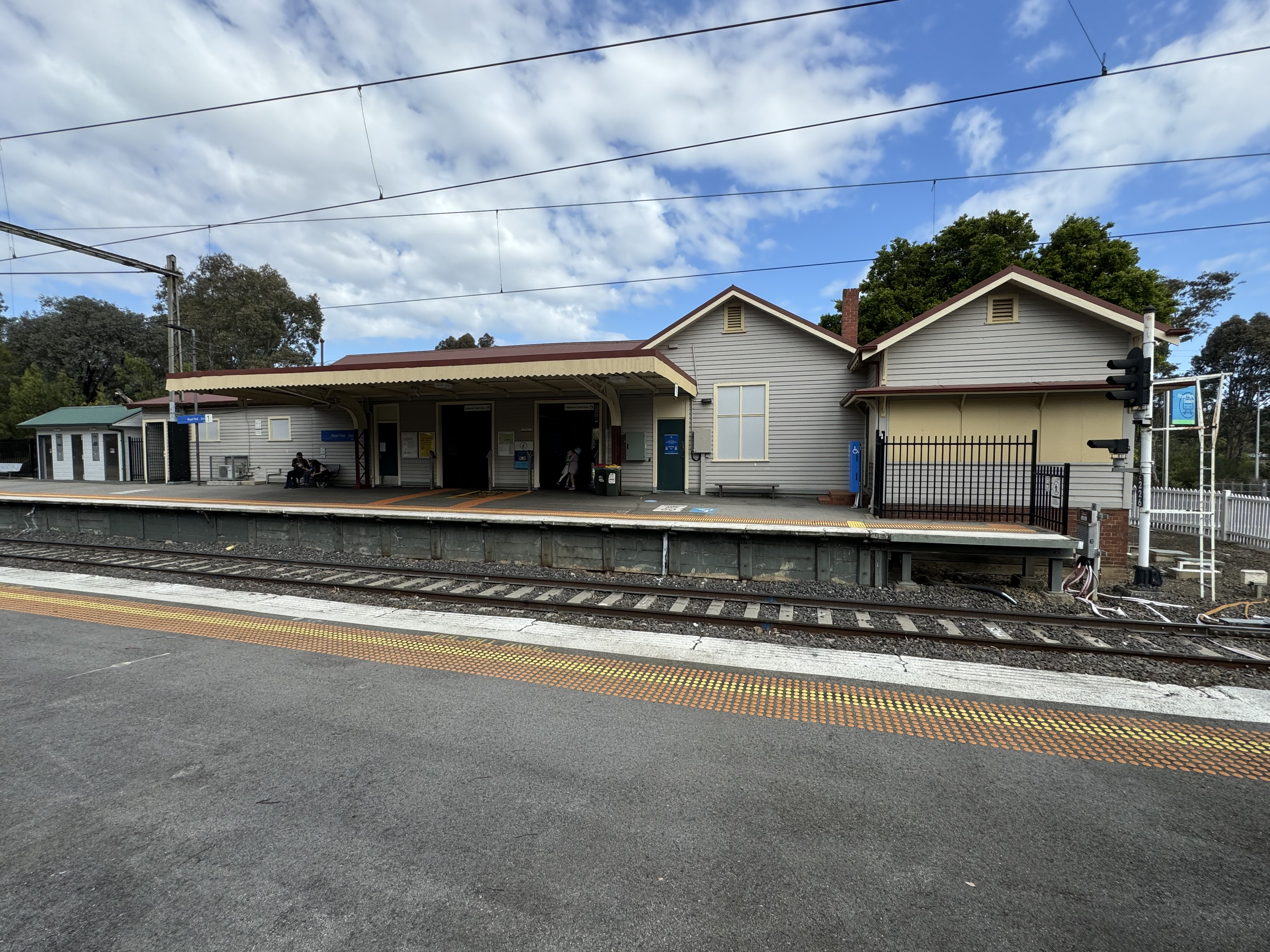
The current station building on Platform 1 which opened in 1920, October 2024

In 1920, the current station building on Platform 1 opened, after the original station building was destroyed by fire in 1919. It opened with a tile roof in the "Gisborne style" and, in 1936, a new waiting shed and ticket office replaced earlier structures on Platform 2.

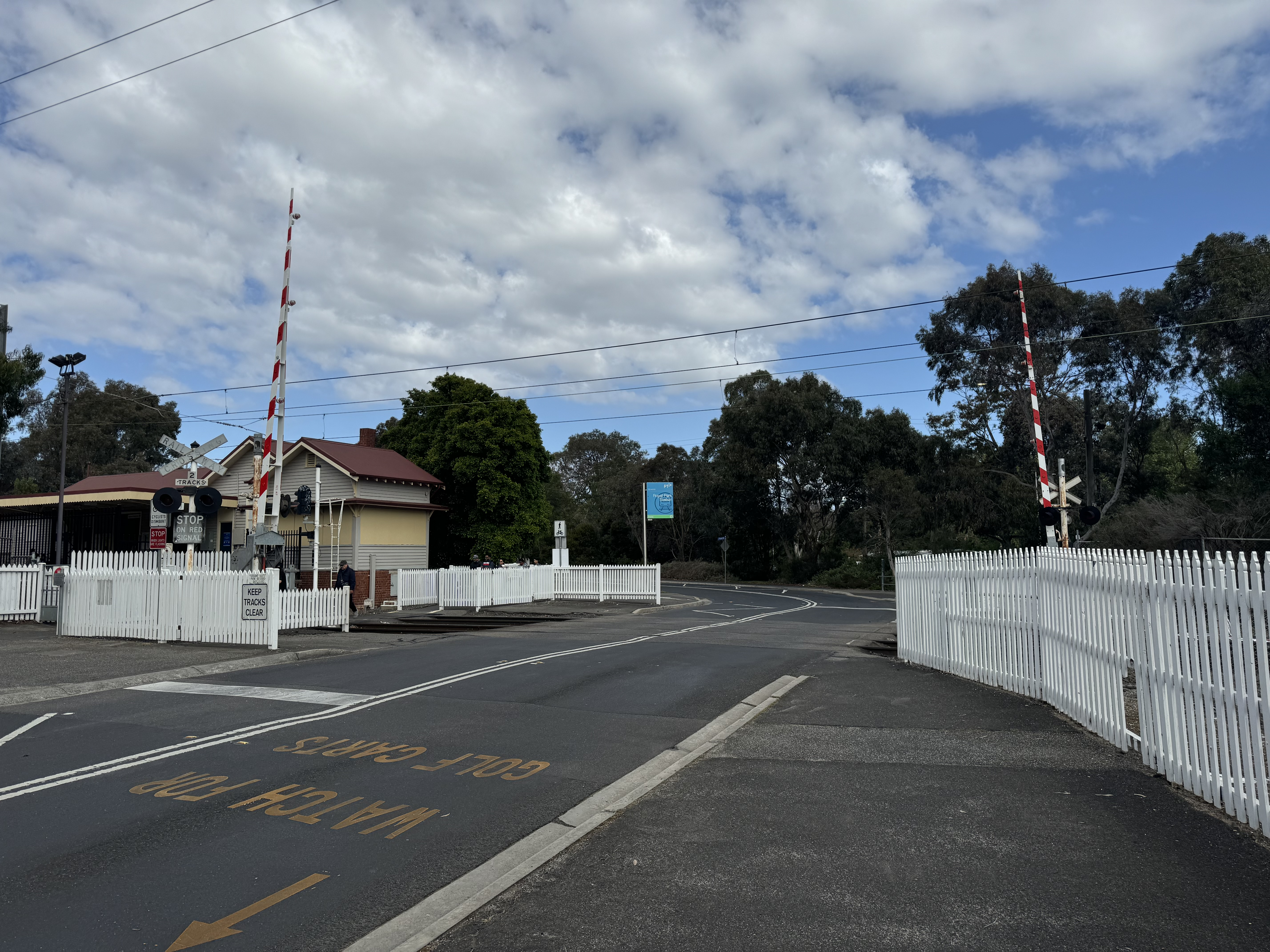
The current boom gate barriers at the Poplar Road level crossing, October 2024

In 1971, boom barriers replaced interlocked gates at the Poplar Road level crossing, located at the up end of the station, when automatic signalling reached the station from Jewell, with automatic signaling extended to Macaulay in 1972. In August 1981, the Inner Circle line (by then a goods-only stub to Fitzroy) was closed, although Newsrail (October 2025, p. 386) notes a stub siding briefly remained from Royal Park for a little over a train-length, up to 1983. It is not known when the junction itself was removed, but the 1982 Working Time Table shows the signal box as "closed", and track renewals were undertaken between Royal Park and Jewell in August 1982; Somersault (Vol.17 No.2 p. 30) postulates this window as a time when the junction was removed. Either way, the signal box was permanently switched out, finally being abolished in 1994. In 1989, the waiting shed on Platform 2 was destroyed by arson.

== Platforms and services ==
Royal Park has two side platforms. It is serviced by Metro Trains' Upfield line services.

Royal Park platform arrangement
Platform	Line	Destination	Via	Service Type	Notes	Source
1	Upfield line	Flinders Street	City Loop	All stations	See City Loop for operating patterns	
2	Upfield line	Upfield		All stations		

== Transport links ==
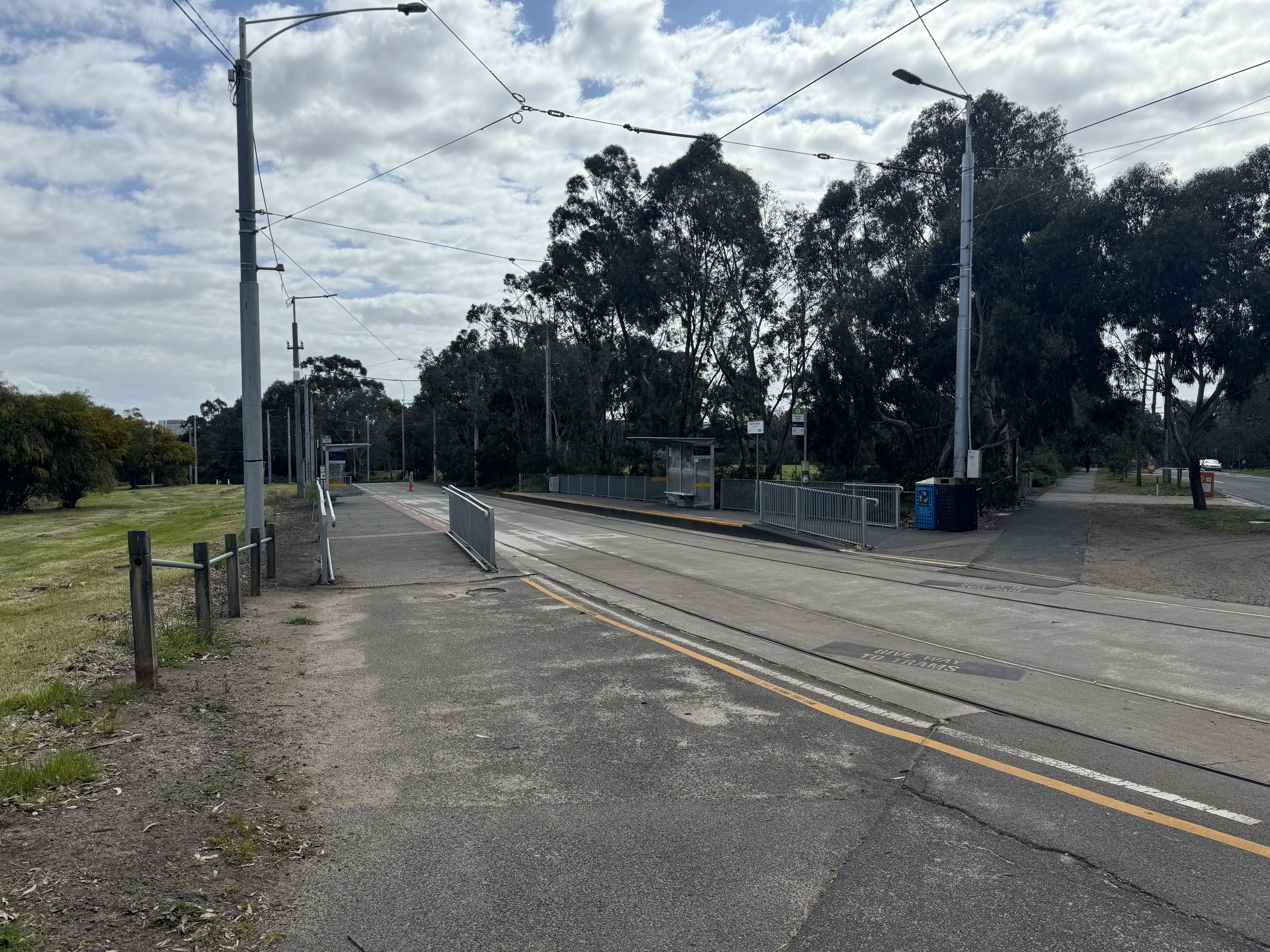
The route 58 tram stop at Royal Park station, on the south side of Poplar Road and located south-west of Royal Park station, October 2024

Kinetic Melbourne operates one route via Royal Park station, under contract to Public Transport Victoria:

- 505 : Moonee Ponds Junction – Melbourne University

Yarra Trams operates one route via Royal Park station:

- : West Coburg – Toorak
