= JWL =

JWL may refer to:

- Jewell railway station, in Victoria, Australia
- JWL equation of state, Jones-Wilkins-Lee equation of state for explosives
- JWL standard (Japan Light Alloy Wheel standard), a set of requirements for alloy wheels set by the Ministry of Land, Infrastructure, Transport and Tourism (Japan) that must be met for all passenger cars in Japan
