= Fitzroy railway station, Melbourne =

Former railway station in Victoria, Australia

Coordinates: 37°47′24″S 144°58′57″E

Fitzroy

General information
- Line: Inner Circle

Other information
- Status: Closed

History
- Opened: 1888
- Closed: 1892 (to passengers); 1981 (to freight)

Services
| Preceding station | Disused railways | Following station |
|---|---|---|
| North Fitzroy | Inner Circle line | Terminus |
| | List of closed railway stations in Melbourne | |
Location

Fitzroy is a former railway station which was on a branch of the Inner Circle line in Melbourne, Australia. The branch ran through the Edinburgh Gardens, just east of the Brunswick Street Oval. The station was opened in 1888, but poor patronage led to its closure to passenger services in May 1892. The line was thereafter used only for goods trains, which lasted until 1981. The site is now occupied by a medium-density housing estate.

The last remaining part of the station, a lengthy footbridge, was dismantled and relocated to Moorooduc railway station on the Mornington Railway, where it has been rebuilt and restored.
