= North Carlton railway station =

Former railway station in Victoria, Australia

Coordinates: 37°46′46″S 144°58′0″E

North Carlton
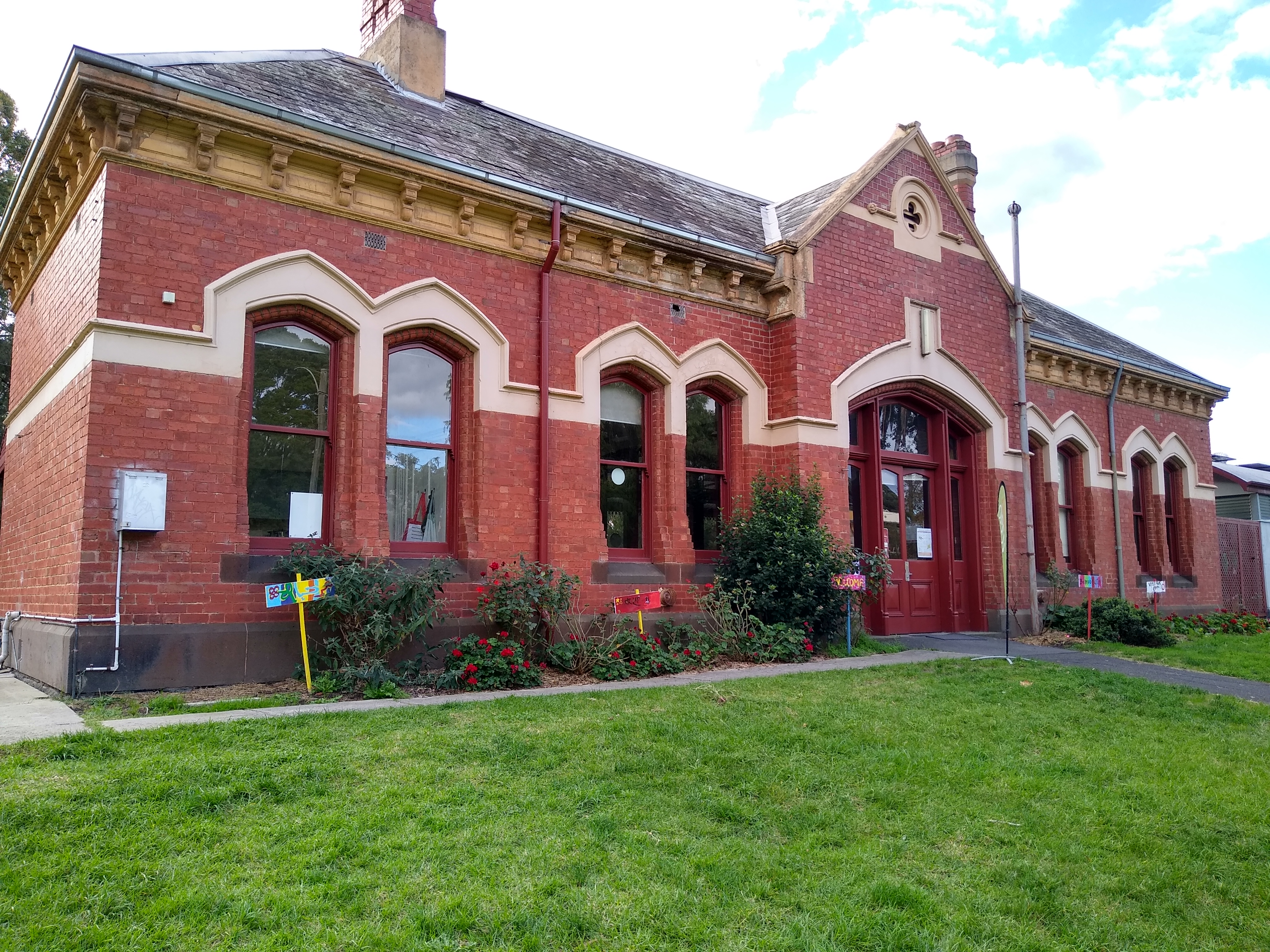
- Station building in May 2022

General information
- Line: Inner Circle
- Platforms: 2
- Tracks: 2

Other information
- Status: Closed

History
- Opened: 1885
- Closed: 1948

Services
Preceding station	Disused railways	Following station
Royal Park	Inner Circle line	North Fitzroy
	List of closed railway stations in Melbourne	
Location

North Carlton is a former railway station that was located on the Inner Circle railway line in Melbourne, Australia. It was located on Lang Street. The station was opened on 8 May 1885, and was originally called Langridge-street and later Lang Street.

Regular passenger services ceased in 1948, although some trains were run in the years after that to cater for spectators attending football matches at nearby Princes Park.

Until the mid-1970s, the station building was used as a residence by the former station master and his wife, Mr. and Mrs. Barnes. It was vacated after their deaths. The building is now the North Carlton Station Neighborhood House.
