= Brunswick Street Oval =

Australian rules football and cricket ground

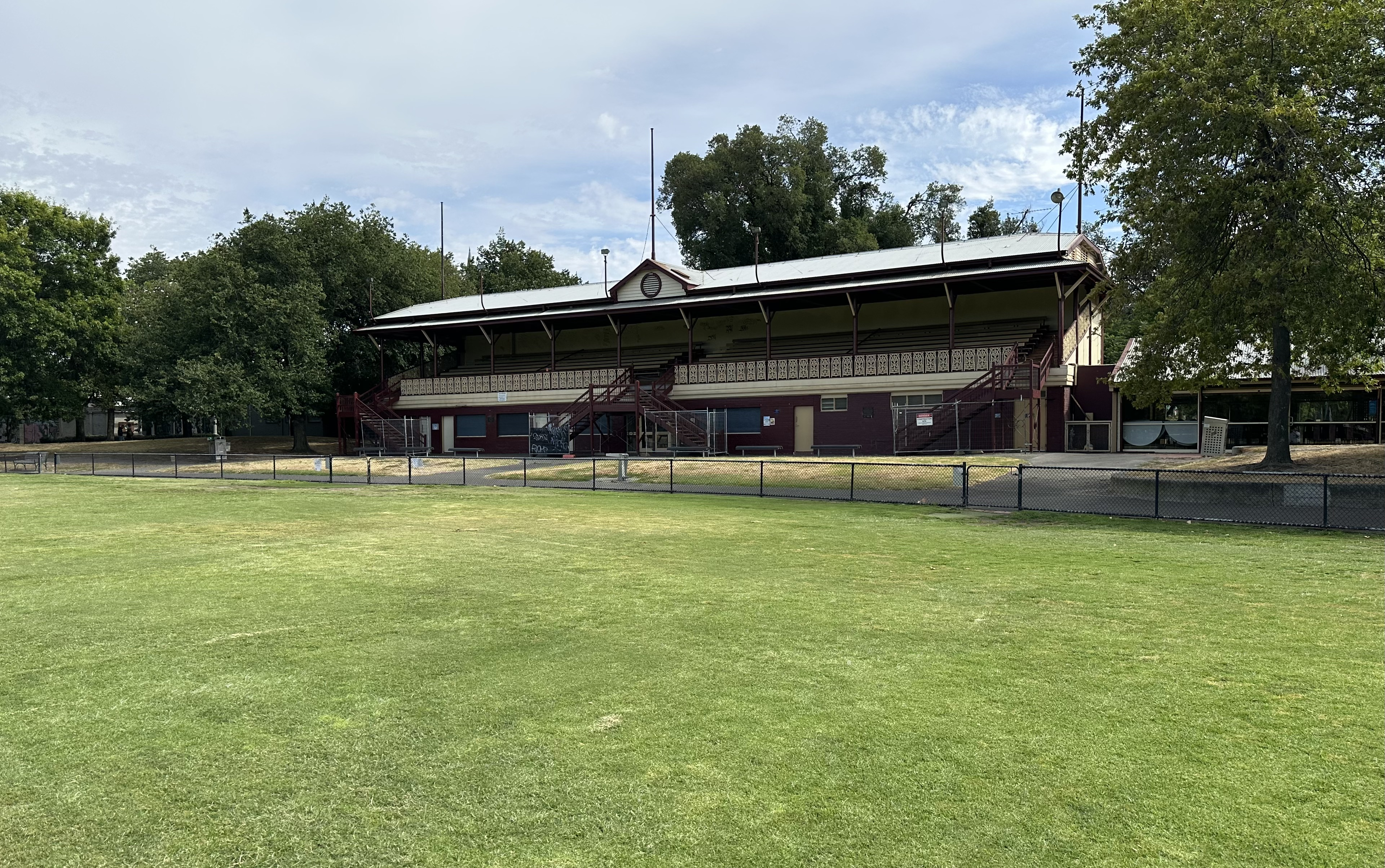
- The heritage-listed grandstand in 2026
- Interactive map of Brunswick Street Oval
- Full name: W. T. Peterson Community Oval
- Former names: Fitzroy Cricket Ground
- Address: Brunswick Street; Edinburgh Gardens, Fitzroy North, Melbourne, Victoria, Australia
- Coordinates: 37°47′20″S 144°58′51″E
- Owner: City of Yarra
- Capacity: 10,000
- Type: Sports field
- Surface: Grass
- Record attendance: 36,000 (Fitzroy vs Collingwood, 6 May 1935)
- Field size: 150 m (490 ft) long by 130 m (430 ft) wide
- Field shape: Oval
- Public transit: – Rushall; –; –; – Capital City Trail

Construction
- Opened: 1883; 143 years ago

Tenants
- Fitzroy Football Club (1883–1970; 2009–); Fitzroy Cricket Club (1872–1986); Fitzroy Reds (1991–2008)

Victorian Heritage Register
- Official name: Brunswick Street Oval Grandstand
- Type: Registered place
- Criteria: A, D
- Designated: 27 June 1990
- Reference no.: H0751
- Heritage overlay no.: HO215
- Category: Recreation and Entertainment
- Architect: Nathaniel Billing

The Brunswick Street Oval (officially known as the W. T. Peterson Community Oval) is an Australian rules football and cricket ground located within Edinburgh Gardens in the suburb of Fitzroy North, in Melbourne, Victoria, Australia. It is managed by the City of Yarra.

Established in 1883 as the Fitzroy Cricket Ground, the venue served as the principal home of the Fitzroy Football Club until the end of 1966 (with the training and administrative base remaining until 1970). The club returned to playing at the venue when it entered the Victorian Amateur Football Association (VAFA) in 2009. Additionally, the oval also served as the main ground for the Fitzroy Cricket Club from 1872 until 1986.

The grandstand, completed in 1888, was added to the Victorian Heritage Register on 27 June 1990 in recognition of its architectural and historical significance.

== Description ==
The oval is 150 metres (490 ft) long and 130 metres (430 ft) wide.

In May 2026, work began on the redevelopment of Edinburgh Gardens and associated sporting facilities, expected to be completed in 2027. The redevelopment includes the installation of new tennis courts and upgrade of tennis facilities, and the construction of an accessible two-storey sports pavilion. The project is funded through the Victorian Government ($24 million), the City of Yarra ($3.58 million) and the Australian Football League and Cricket Australia ($100,000 each). Improvements to the heritage-listed grandstand were flagged for a future stage development.

== History ==
=== Australian rules football ===
The ground is the home of the Fitzroy Football Club in the Victorian Amateur Football Association. It was also Fitzroy's home in the Victorian Football Association from 1884 to 1896, and in the Victorian Football League from 1897 until 1966, with the last game played there on Saturday 20 August 1966 against St Kilda, a game which the Fitzroy Lions lost by 84 points. The Fitzroy Football Club then moved its home games to Princes Park, sharing the ground with Carlton Football Club between 1967 and 1969, while keeping their training and administrative base at the Brunswick Street Oval, before moving its home games and their training and administrative base to the Junction Oval in St Kilda from 1970. A total of 747 matches at the top level of Victorian senior football – 135 in the VFA and 612 in the VFL – were played at the ground over 83 seasons of competition.

The ground was also used for Australian football during the late 1970s and 1980s by the Fitzroy Rovers Football Club in the Western Suburban Football League, before it began to be used by the University Reds football club in the Victorian Amateur Football Association in 1991. In 1996, the Fitzroy Football Club were placed into administration, ultimately leaving the AFL at the end of the 1996 season. That year the club's AFL license was taken over by the Brisbane Bears, at which point the Bears changed their name to the Brisbane Bears-Fitzroy Football Club (BBFFC or Brisbane Lions). Fitzroy eventually came out of administration in 1998, and merged with the Fitzroy Reds in 2009, to rejoin competitive football within the Victorian Amateur Football Association, and are now based at the oval once again.

The main grandstand was added to the Victorian Heritage Register in 1990.

=== Cricket ===
The venue's original tenants, the Fitzroy Cricket Club, used the venue as its primary home ground from 1872 until it left the venue in 1986, when they merged with the Doncaster Cricket Club. The venue hosted one first-class cricket match, between Victoria and Western Australia in 1925/26. The venue remains home ground of the Edinburgh Cricket Club which was established in 1978 and is one of the largest cricket clubs in Victoria with 40 junior sides ranging from under 10 to under 18.

=== Soccer ===
During the 1975 and 1976 Victorian State League seasons, the venue was used by the soccer club Heidelberg United (then known as Fitzroy United Alexander), as well as one fixture in the National Soccer League. In the 1980s the venue was used intermittently by several lower-league soccer clubs up until 1990. The venue had previously hosted several showpiece soccer matches in the 1910s and 1920s, including Dockerty Cup finals, the annual local 'internationals' as well as genuine international matches.

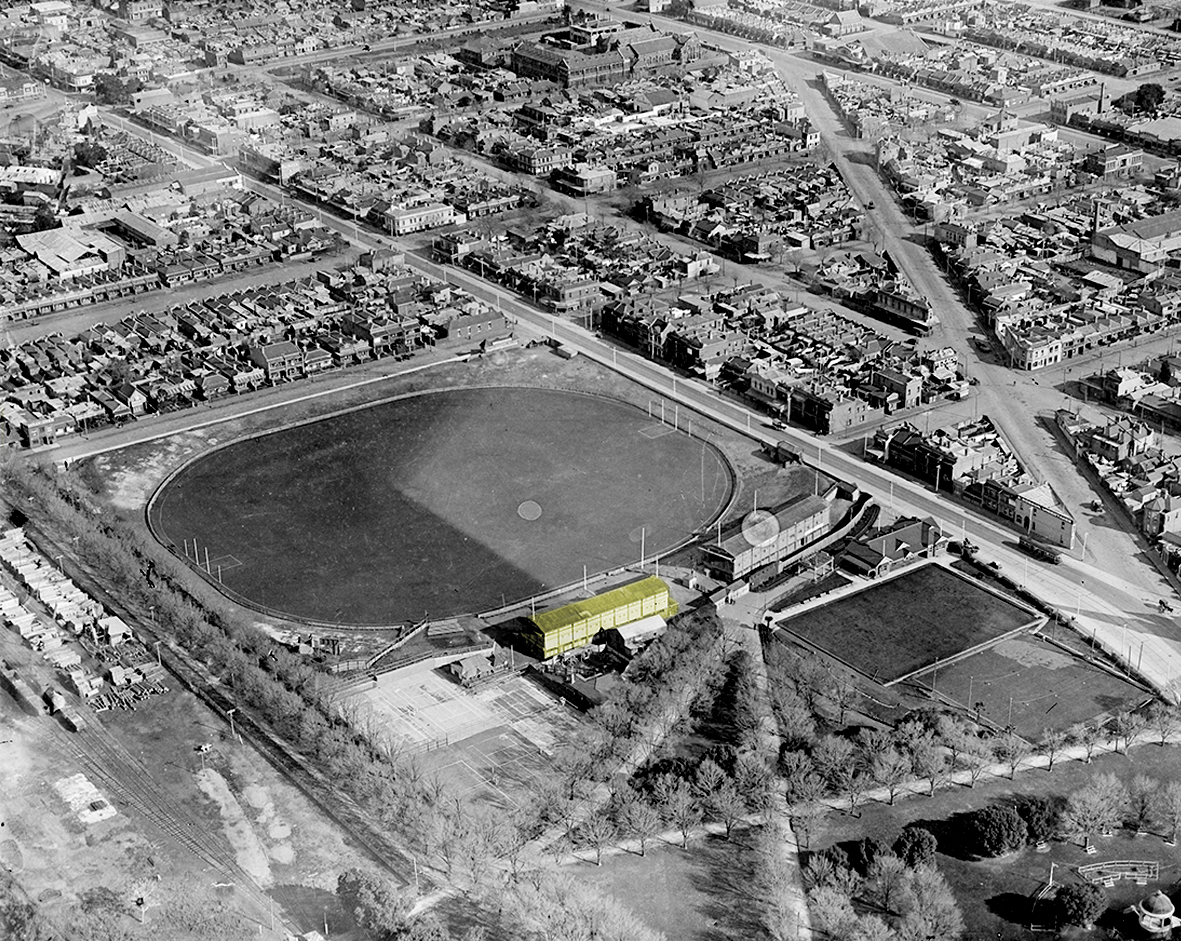
Aerial view of the oval, parts of Edinburgh Gardens, and surrounds, 1925. The 1888 grandstand is shaded in yellow (centre); and the 1905 grandstand, no longer extant, can be seen to its right.

== Structures ==
The main structures at the oval include the 1888 heritage-listed grandstand, a 1905 grandstand that was destroyed in 1977, and two gatehouses – one made of timber and the other, brick. Some other structures exist on the site, not materially significant.

=== Grandstand ===
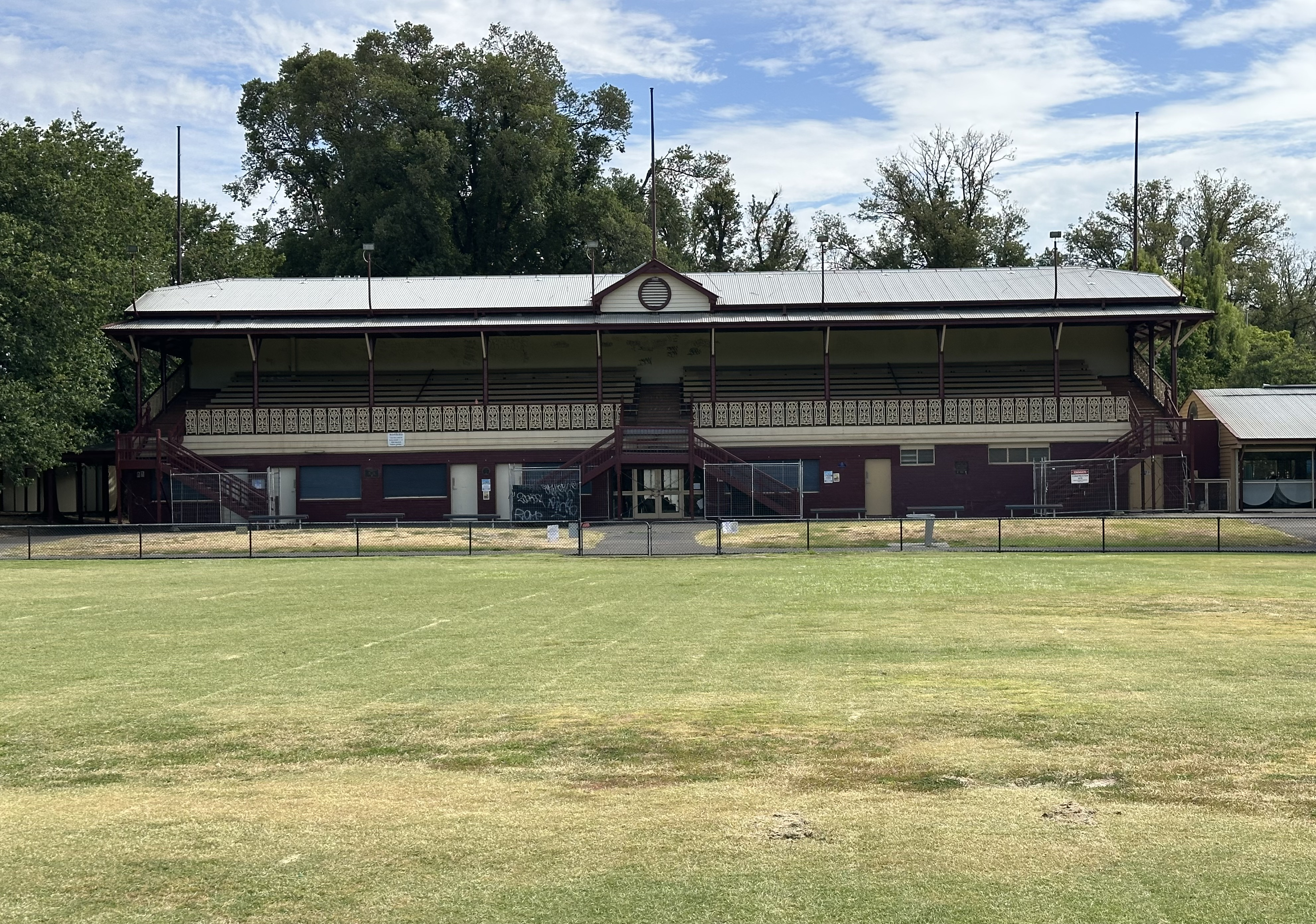
Grandstand, front, 2026

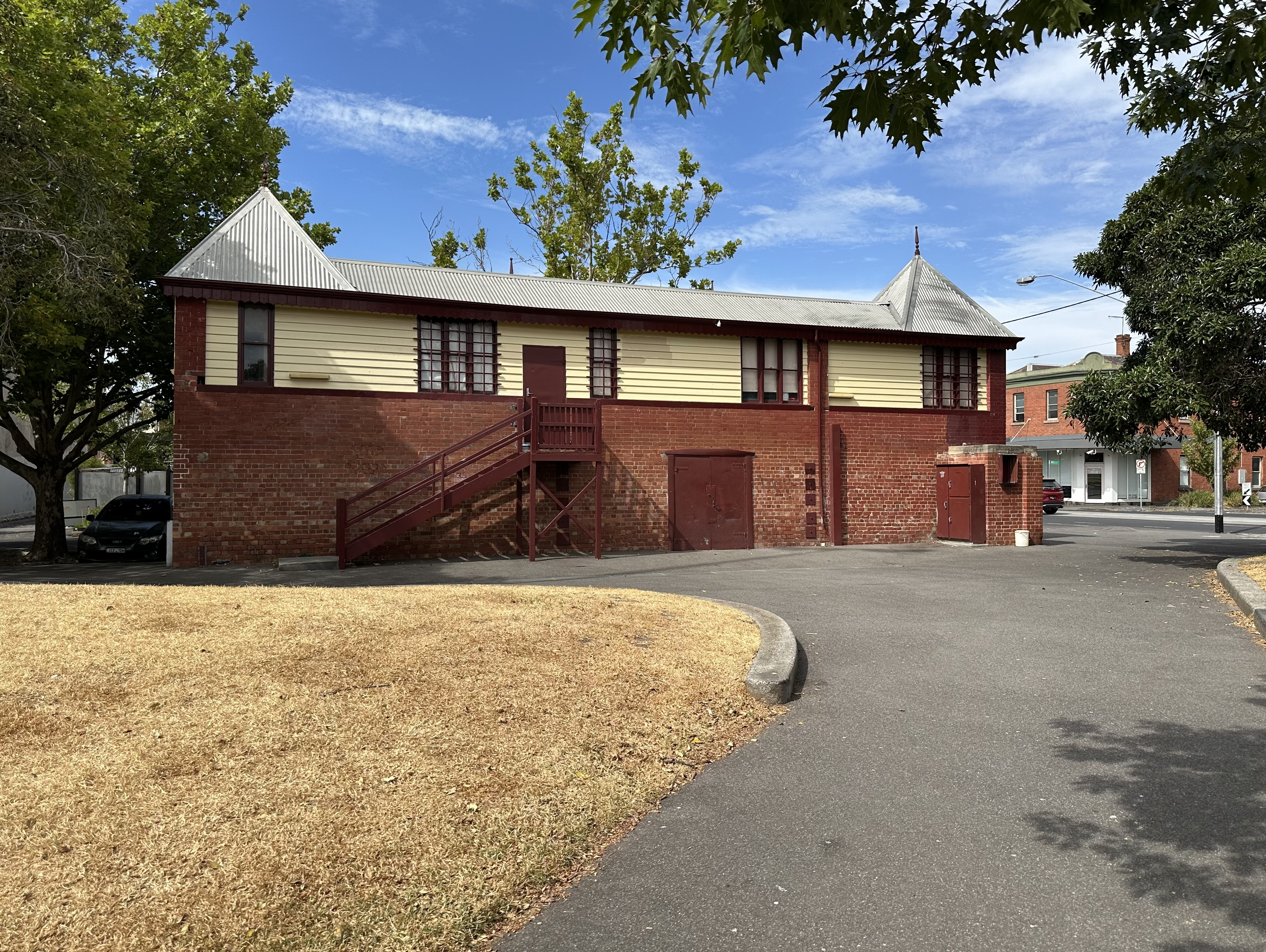
Grandstand, rear, 2026

The Brunswick Street Oval Grandstand is historically significant as one of the earliest surviving nineteenth-century grandstands in the metropolitan area. Constructed in 1888 to the design of Nathaniel Billing and Son Architects, the brick and timber grandstand has an enduring association with the development of Australian rules football and cricket and their growth as popular recreational pastimes from the late nineteenth century onwards. The Grandstand remains as an important reminder of the contribution made by Fitzroy to the history of Australian rules football in Victoria.

The grandstand is architecturally significant as a fine and intact example of a nineteenth-century timber grandstand and exhibits high quality design characteristics in its symmetrical composition and restrained decorative details. Many grandstands constructed in this era have been demolished or substantially altered and it remains a comparatively intact surviving example. The structure is half hipped at either end with a small projecting weatherboard clad gable that was designed to take a clock face that never eventuated. A cantilever roof below the main corrugated iron roof surrounds the building, strutted out from un-fluted iron Corinthian columns. A balustrade of cast iron panels runs along the front and up the sloping sides. The rear of the grandstand has panels with diagonal boarding set in chamfer-stopped frames. The timber trussed roof, clad in corrugated iron, appears to have supported finials at either end. There are flag poles at the far end above the gables. The upper-level timber bench seating is accessed by a dual central staircase and corner single staircases to the east and west. Change rooms and clubrooms are located beneath the upper-level on the ground level, that has been extensively altered, both internally and externally, over many years.

In 2022 the Fitzroy Football Club announced the grandstand would be named the Kevin Murray Stand for all future Fitzroy home games, in honour of club great Kevin Murray, a nine-time best and fairest with the club and the winner of the 1969 Brownlow Medal. A special sign to acknowledge Murray is erected on game days and adorns the grandstand. Despite the acknowledgment, the grandstand is still officially called the Heritage Grandstand by the City of Yarra, which owns the ground and uses the title in its official documentation.

=== 1905 grandstand ===
The adjoining stand, of which only the foundations remain, appears to have been similar to the 1888 grandstand. This stand was built in 1905 for A£3,000. and was burnt down in 1977.

=== Timber gatehouse ===
The timber gatehouse club building is similar to a pavilion in the Treasury Gardens, with a five-bay arrangement with a pediment over the central bay. The roof is of corrugated iron with delicate cast iron ridge capping along the main and transverse ridges. The valence boarding consists of short pointed lengths of board projecting downwards so that a pair of adjoining boards from an ogee arch. This boarding continues around to the gable ends. Above each gateway bay are panels containing diagonal boarding with chamfer-stopped timber framing members. Two very simple half finials remain – these are composed of a central spike and a little bracket which projects outwards from the gable end. The date of construction is not known; however it was probably constructed in c. 1900.

=== Brick gatehouse ===
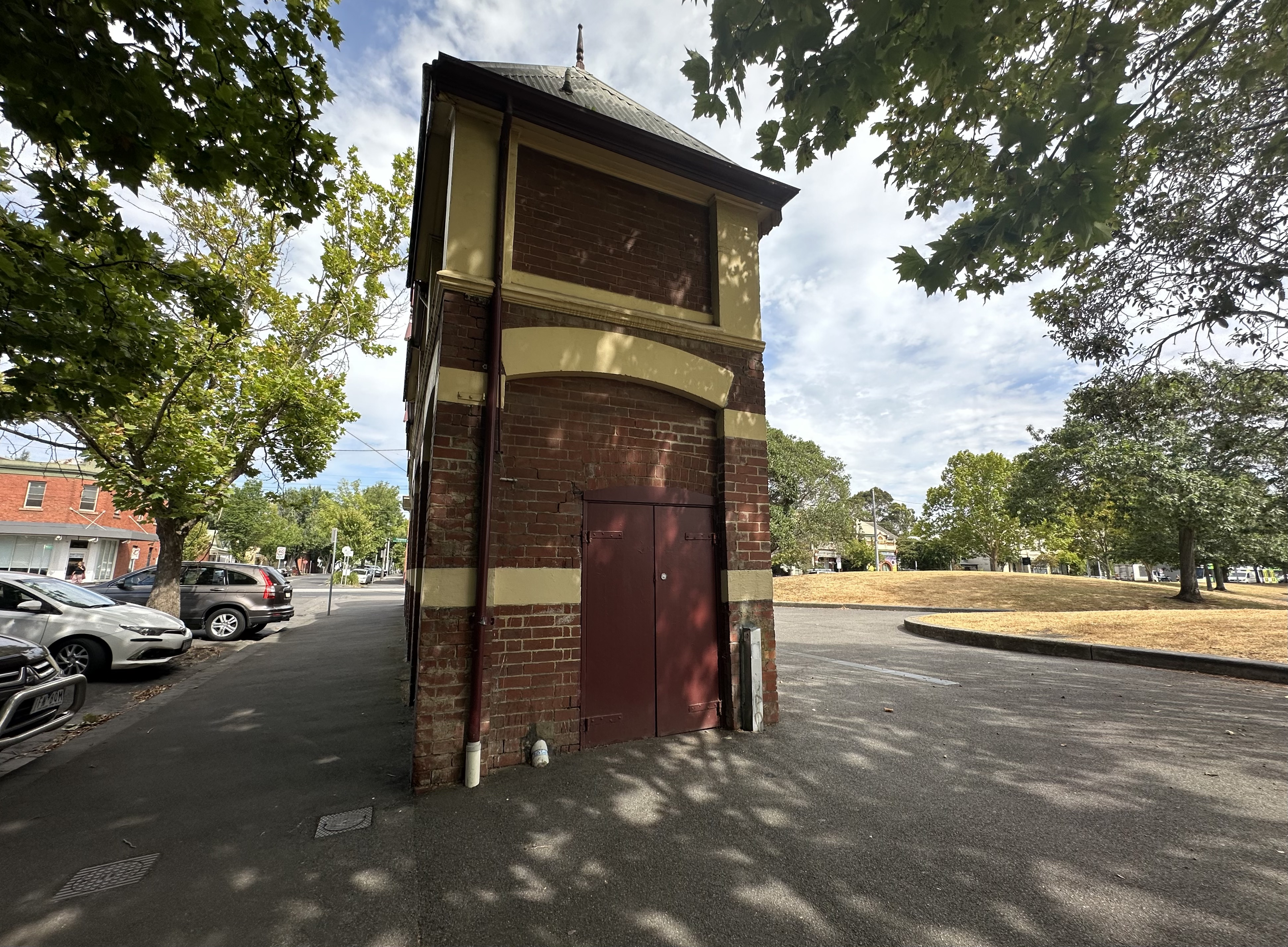
Brick gatehouse, 2026

The brick gatehouse was constructed in c. 1895 and presents a facade to Freeman Street of seven bays. The four bays projecting slightly forwards are surmounted by timber finials. The end bays behind the gables are surmounted by unusual pyramidical roofs, reminiscent of the work of William Kent. The whole facade is in red brick decorated by cement bands, and is typical of building work in the early twentieth century. The original use of this building is uncertain. In the ground floor there are lavatories and urinals all the way along. The upper floor looks as though it must have been a sitting or standing area. It is now sheeted over but has ornamental pointed valence boards hanging down all the way along. This is similar to the timber work in the timber gatehouse at the north side of the cricket ground.

=== 2026 redevelopment ===
In May 2026 works commenced on a $12.8 million redevelopment of the oval and surrounding precinct, which was funded by the Victorian government, Yarra City Council, Australian Football League and the Australian Cricket Infrastructure Fund. Proposed upgrades to the oval's facilities had been delayed and before council for several years prior to the works commencing. As well as the upgrade and expansion of the adjacent tennis courts and an adjoining community gathering room, the redevelopment adds a two-storey sports pavilion overlooking the oval, providing permanent club rooms for the Fitzroy Football Club's men's and women's teams and Fitzroy Juniors. The Heritage grandstand will also be upgraded to improve the existing changing rooms and spectator amenities. The redevelopment is expected to conclude in late 2027.

== Records ==
- VFA games: 135 between 1883 and 1896, including 122 which Fitzroy played in.
- VFL games: 612 between 1897 and 1966, including 609 which Fitzroy played in.
- VFL finals games: 4
- Highest VFA attendance: 22,500 (Fitzroy vs Essendon, 17 September 1892)
- Highest VFL attendance: 36,000 (Fitzroy vs Collingwood, 6 May 1935)

== See also ==
- Parks and gardens of Melbourne
- List of heritage-listed buildings in Melbourne
