= Jewell railway station =

Railway station in Melbourne, Australia

Jewell
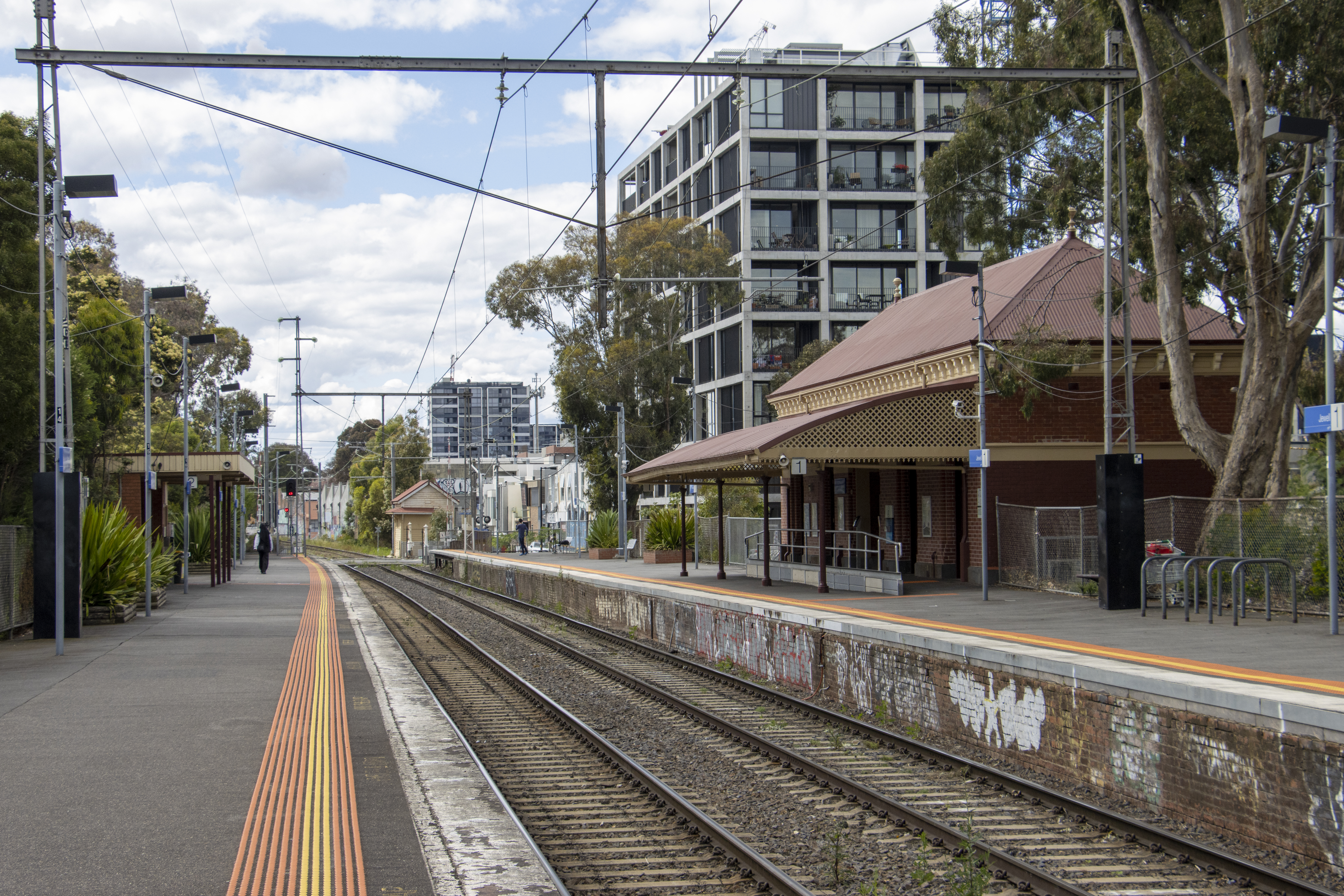
- Northbound view from Platform 2, November 2022

General information
- Location: Wilson Avenue, Brunswick, Victoria 3056; City of Merri-bek; Australia
- Coordinates: 37°46′30″S 144°57′31″E
- System: Public Transport Victoria (PTV) commuter rail station
- Owner: VicTrack
- Operator: Metro Trains
- Line: Upfield
- Distance: 6.50 kilometres from Southern Cross
- Platforms: 2 side
- Tracks: 2
- Connections: Bus; Tram

Construction
- Structure type: Ground
- Accessible: No—steep ramp

Other information
- Status: Operational, unstaffed
- Station code: JWL
- Fare zone: Myki zone 1
- Website: Public Transport Victoria

History
- Opened: 9 September 1884; 142 years ago
- Electrified: December 1920 (1500 V DC overhead)
- Former names: South Brunswick (1884–1954)

Passengers
- 2005–2006: 281,800
- 2006–2007: 309,812 ▲9.94%
- 2007–2008: 345,569 ▲11.54%
- 2008–2009: 387,580 ▲12.15%
- 2009–2010: 422,703 ▲9.06%
- 2010–2011: 426,176 ▲0.82%
- 2011–2012: 420,257 ▼1.39%
- 2012–2013: Not measured
- 2013–2014: 416,204 ▼0.96%
- 2014–2015: 431,490 ▲3.67%
- 2015–2016: 433,658 ▲0.5%
- 2016–2017: 451,102 ▲4.02%
- 2017–2018: 439,218 ▼2.63%
- 2018–2019: 422,900 ▼3.71%
- 2019–2020: 315,750 ▼25.34%
- 2020–2021: 135,400 ▼57.1%
- 2021–2022: 178,100 ▲31.53%

Services
Preceding station	Metro Trains	Following station
Royal Park towards Flinders Street	Upfield line	Brunswick towards Upfield
Track layout
Location

Jewell station is a railway station operated by Metro Trains Melbourne on the Upfield line, part of the Melbourne rail network. It serves the northern suburb of Brunswick in Melbourne, Victoria, Australia. Jewell station is a ground-level unstaffed station, featuring two side platforms. It opened on the 9th of September in 1884 as South Brunswick railway station.

Initially opened as South Brunswick railway station, the station was given its current name of Jewell on 1 February 1954. It was named after James (Jimmy) Robert Jewell, a working-class socialist who actively represented the working-class interests of Brunswick people through local and state governments as well as being a member of community associations like the Brunswick Technical School Council.

A disused goods shed is located next to the entrance to Platform 1, and a disused signal box is located at the down end of the station, next to the Union Street level crossing. The main station building, signal box and level crossing gates are listed on the Victorian Heritage Register.

== History ==
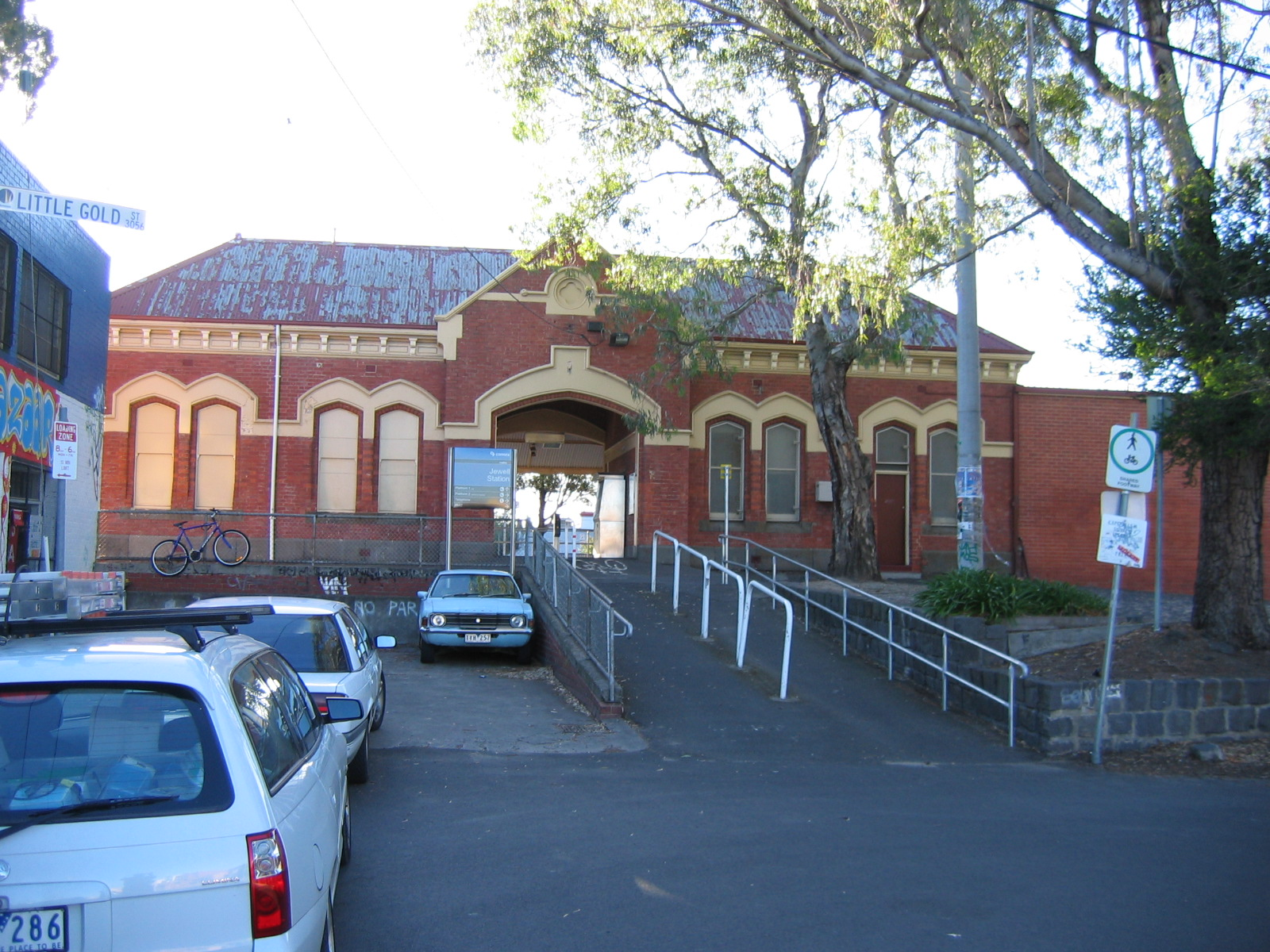
Heritage station building and entrance to Platform 1, November 2007

Jewell station opened when the railway line from North Melbourne was extended to Coburg. It was renamed in honour of a long-serving member of the State Parliament, James Jewell, who represented the Brunswick electorate from 1910 to 1949. In 1971, automatic signalling was provided between Jewell and Royal Park, replacing double line block signalling. The goods yard was closed to traffic in 1977. Former siding "B" was also abolished in that year.

In 1997, siding "A", a crossover, and a number of points and signal discs at the station were abolished. In August 1998, the former level crossing at Barkly Street, at the up end of the station, was closed to vehicle traffic. In September of that year, boom barriers replaced interlocked gates at the Union Street level crossing at the down end of the station. The signal box protecting the level crossing was also abolished during that time. In 2018, upgrades to the station were completed which included restoration, enhanced open space, and a new commercial and residential development adjacent to the eastern side of the station; a program of community consultation was undertaken to find out local people's priorities for any alterations, with safety and better access were identified as main the concerns.

=== Heritage listing ===
The former Coburg railway line was added to the Victorian Heritage Register on 23 October 1997 in recognition of its historical significance. The heritage curtail is extensive that includes seven distinct precincts that contain nineteenth century station buildings and platforms at Coburg, Moreland, Jewell, and Brunswick, substations, signal boxes, gatekeepers cabins, remnant interlocking and safe-working equipment, levers and rodding, signals, gates and industrial sidings.

== Future ==
The station is slated for closure or relocation under the Level Crossing Removal Project. The project intends to remove the adjacent Union Street level crossing, as well as seven other level crossings in Brunswick, by grade separation to become an elevated. Under the plan, announced in 2024 and expected to be completed in 2030, the three nearby stations of Jewell, Brunswick and Anstey will be replaced by two new stations, each located within 200 metres (660 ft) to 450 metres (1,480 ft) of one of the existing stations. The heritage listed Jewell station building on Platform 1 at the existing station and some heritage listed interlocking hand gates at some closed level crossings will be kept and located at its current spot.

The decision to build two stations in different locations instead of rebuilding Jewell, Brunswick and Anstey generated criticism from residents and the local council. Local newspaper Brunswick Voice reported that the Minister for Transport Infrastructure, Danny Pearson, claimed "the decision to build two stations followed 18 months of technical and engineering assessments which found fewer stations would boost capacity on the line in the future and deliver more open space", noting that "the government claimed the plan would also minimise the impact to heritage in the area, but the politician provided no detail about whether the three station buildings and the historic boom gate operators' cabins would be preserved".

== Platforms and services ==
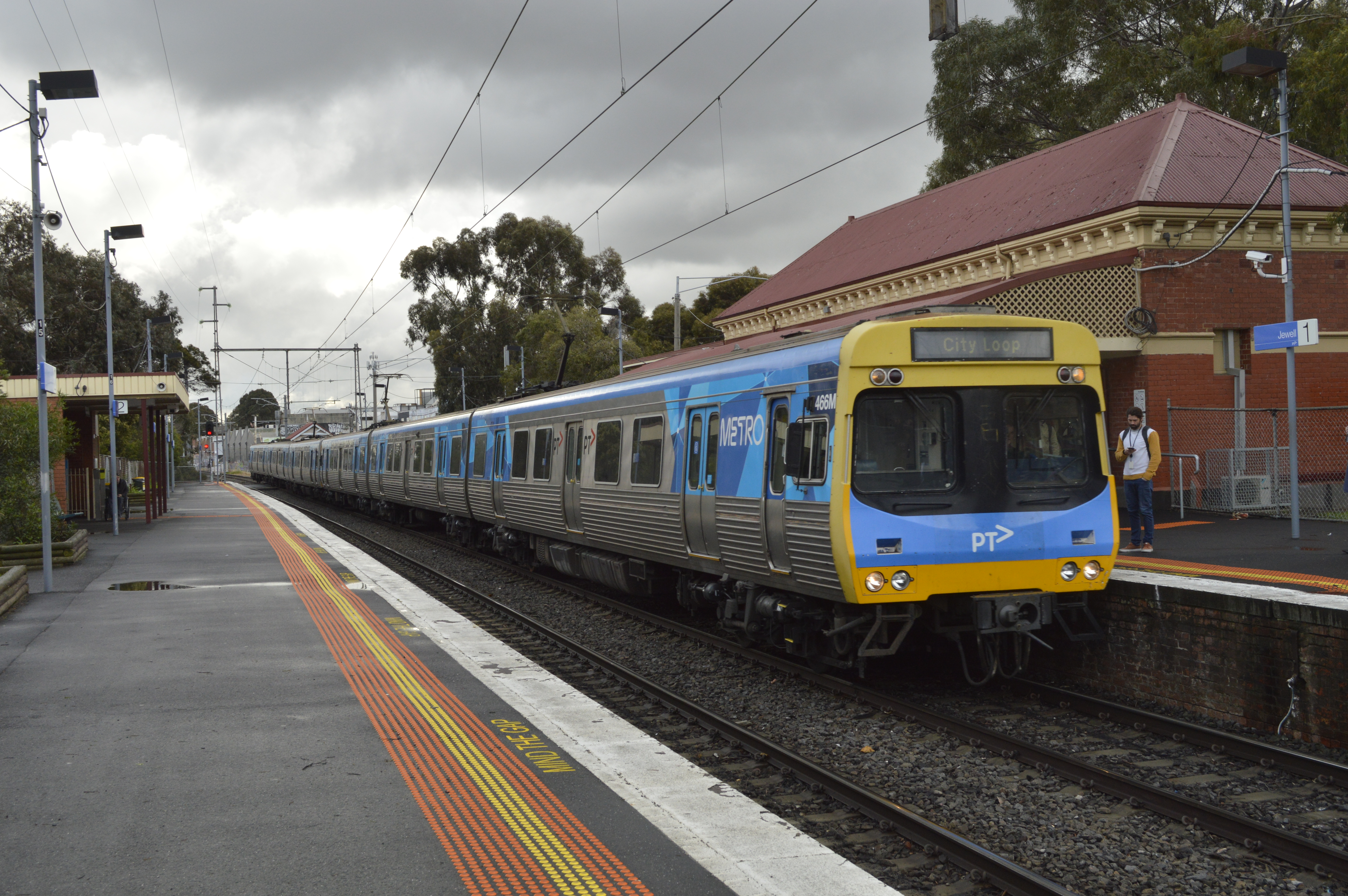
A Comeng train on a Flinders Street-bound service arrives at Platform 1, September 2015

Jewell has two side platforms. It is served by Upfield line trains.

Jewell platform arrangement
Platform	Line	Destination	Via	Service Type	Notes	Source
1	Upfield line	Flinders Street	City Loop	All stations	See City Loop for operating patterns	
2	Upfield line	Upfield		All stations		

== Transport links ==
Kinetic Melbourne operates one bus route via Jewell station, under contract to Public Transport Victoria:

- 509 : Brunswick West – Barkly Square Shopping Centre

Yarra Trams operates one route via Jewell station:

- : North Coburg – Flinders Street station (via Elizabeth Street)
