= Inner Circle railway line =

Former railway line in Melbourne, Australia

Coordinates: 37.77958°S 144.97350°E

Inner Circle
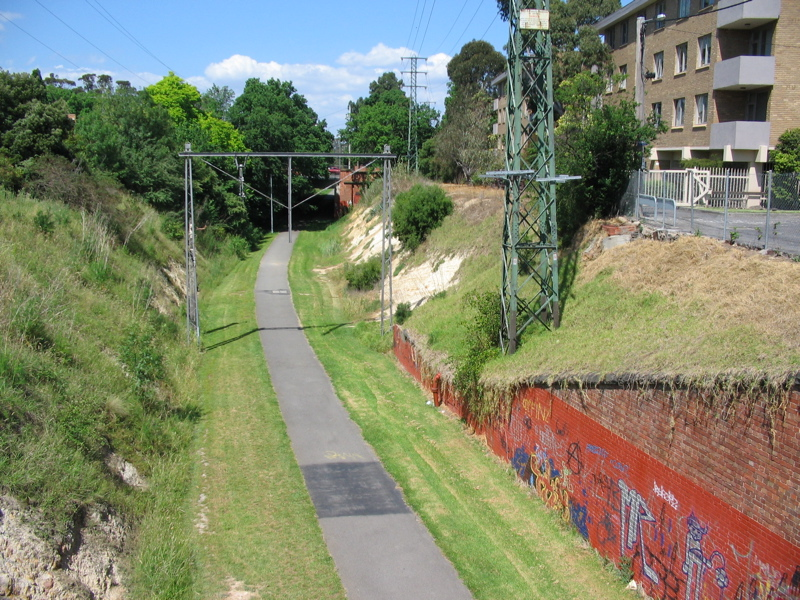
- A section of the Inner Circle line between Royal Parade and The Avenue, Parkville, 2005.

Overview
- Status: Closed line - Inner Circle Rail Trail (part of the Capital City Trail)
- Owner: Victorian Railways (VR) (1888–1974); VR as VicRail (1974–1981)
- Locale: Melbourne, Victoria, Australia
- Termini: Royal Park; Fitzroy, Merri, or Rushall
- Continues from: Upfield
- Continues as: Mernda
- Connecting lines: Mernda, Upfield, Whittlesea lines
- Stations: 3 current stations; 3 former stations

Service
- Type: Former Melbourne suburban service
- Operators: Victorian Railways (VR) (1888–1974); VR as VicRail (1974–1981)

History
- Work began: 8 May 1888
- Opened: Royal Park to Rushall on 8 May 1888; North Fitzroy to Fitzroy on 8 May 1888; North Fitzroy to Merri on 8 October 1889
- Completed: 8 October 1889
- Electrified: Royal Park to North Fitzroy on 5 July 1921; North Fitzroy to Merri / Rushall on 14 July 1921
- De-electrified: Royal Park to Merri / Rushall in c. 1961
- Closed: North Fitzroy to Rushall on 2 May 1965; North Fitzroy to Merri on 21 June 1965; Royal Park to Fitzroy on 31 July 1981

Technical
- Line length: Royal Park to Fitzroy: 4.238 km (2.633 mi); Royal Park to Merri: 3.824 km (2.376 mi); Royal Park to Rushall: 3.367 km (2.092 mi); Total track: 5.638 km (3.503 mi)
- Num of tracks: Single track
- Track gauge: 1,600 mm (5 ft 3 in)

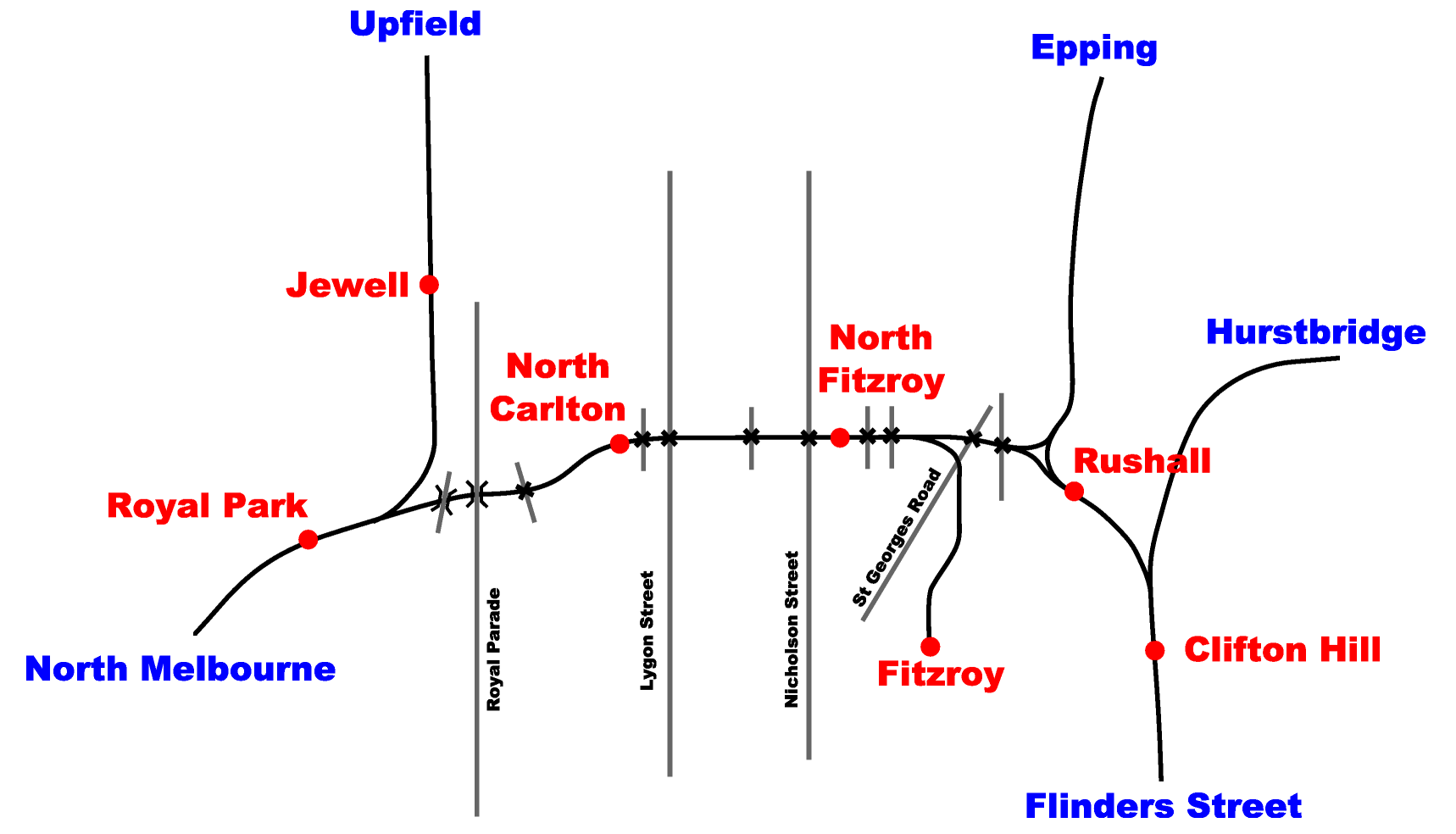
A map of the Inner Circle railway line

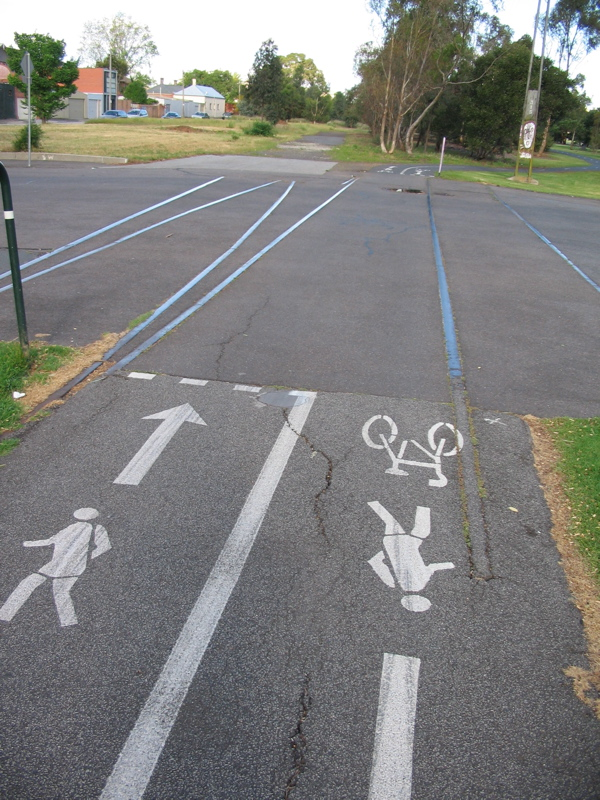
November 2005

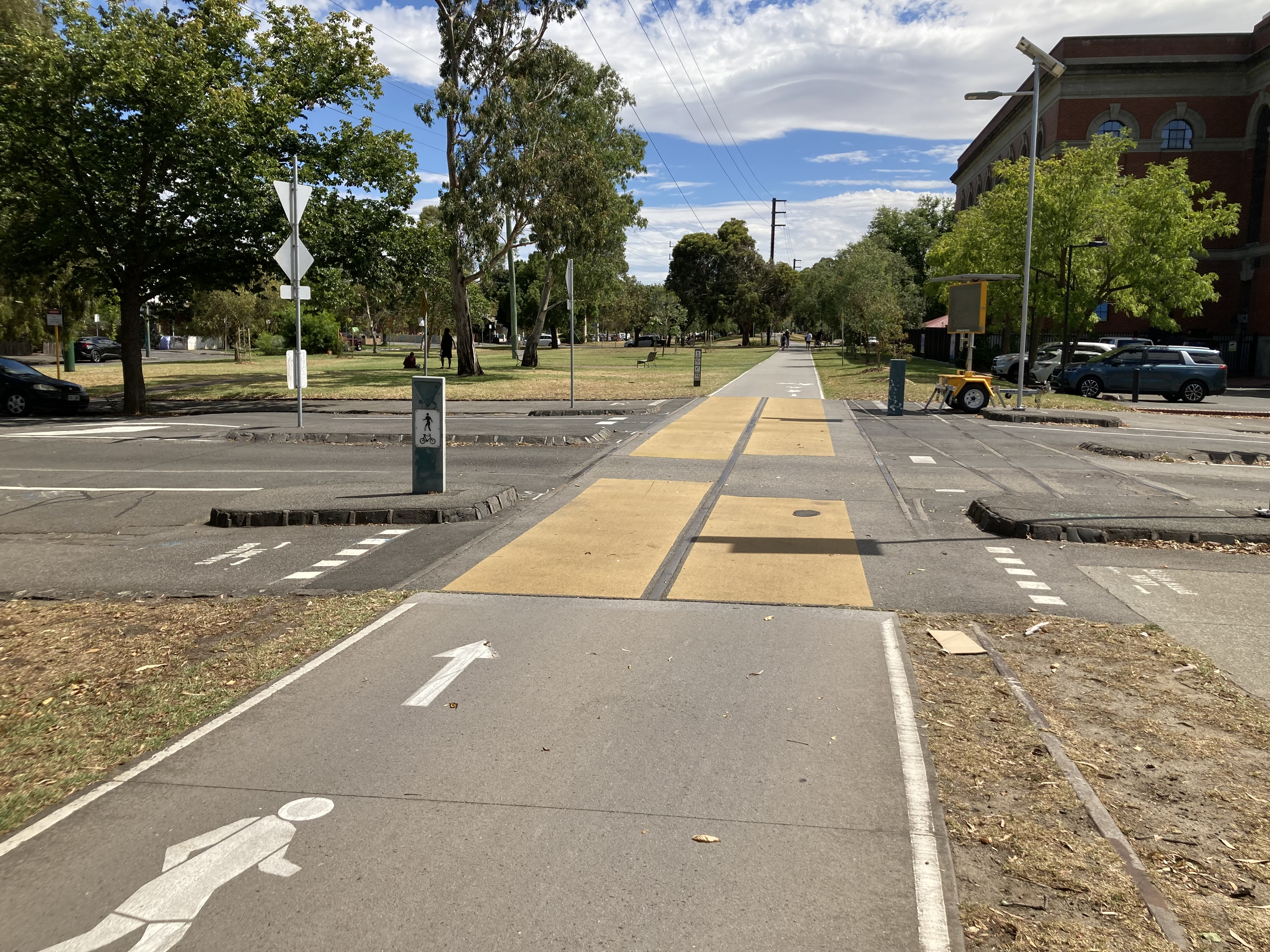
March 2023

Remnants of the Inner Circle railway tracks, crossing Brunswick Street North in Fitzroy North. The line is now a shared user path.

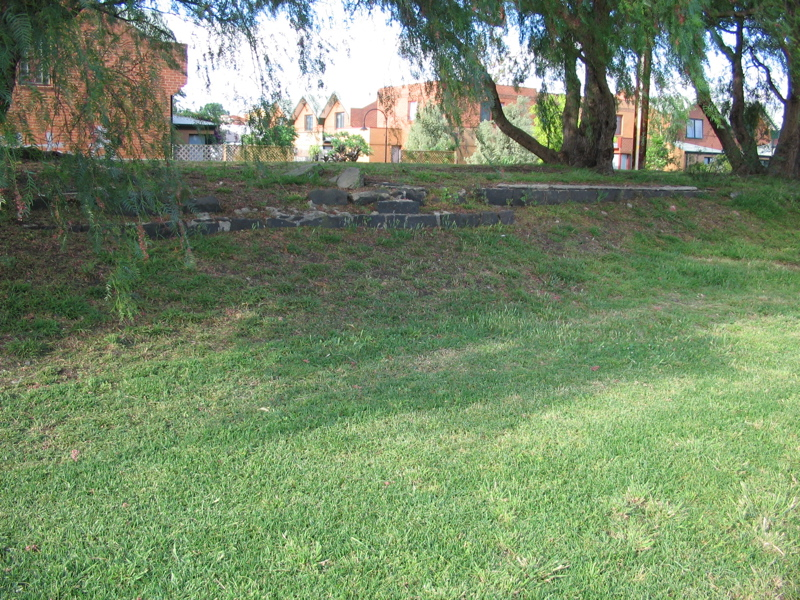
Remains of the former North Fitzroy railway station, 2005

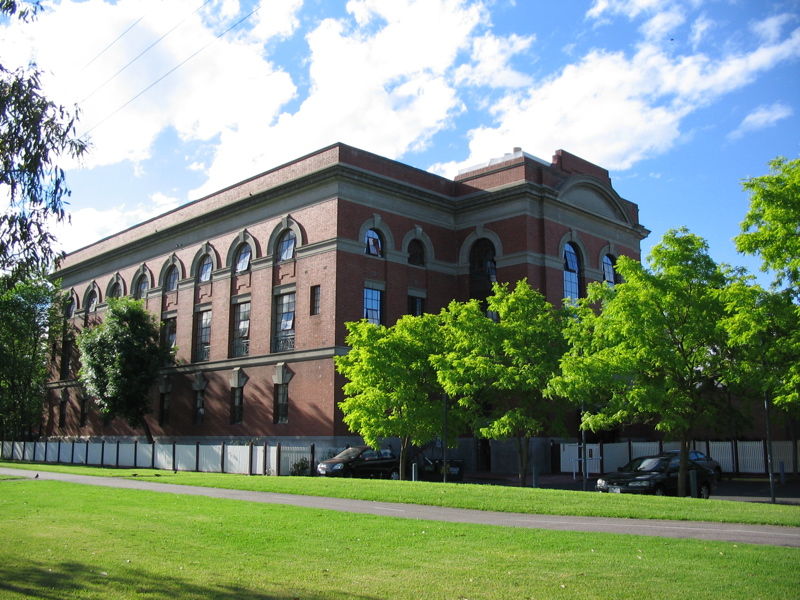
The North Fitzroy Substation, built in 1915 to supply power to the Inner Circle line, 2005

The Inner Circle Line was a steam era suburban railway line (later electrified) in Melbourne, Australia. It served the inner-northern suburbs of Parkville, Carlton North, Fitzroy North and Fitzroy. At its closure, it ran from Royal Park station on the Upfield line in the west to a triangular junction with Rushall and Merri stations on today's Mernda line in the east. A branch line to Fitzroy opened at the same time.

== History ==
The Inner Circle was opened on 8 May 1888 with three stations: North Carlton and North Fitzroy on the main line, and Fitzroy at the end of a short branch line leading south through the Edinburgh Gardens from a junction near North Fitzroy station.

=== As the main line ===
When the Inner Circle line opened, services originated from Spencer Street station at the western end of the Melbourne central business district. Trains bound for the then terminus at Heidelberg station (now on the Hurstbridge line) would run to North Fitzroy station, then continue south to Victoria Park station (then known as Collingwood, and now on the Hurstbridge and Mernda lines). Locomotives would then have to change ends and the trains return to Clifton Hill station, where they diverged east on to the line to Heidelberg.

In December 1889, after the opening of the Whittlesea line, trains ran from Spencer Street to Whittlesea via the Inner Circle. Other services on the same route only travelled as far as Preston station.

A passenger service was originally provided from Spencer Street to Fitzroy station, on the branch line. By October 1889, that had been relegated to a short shuttle service from North Fitzroy station, and the passenger service closed altogether in May 1892.

For a short period between March and May 1891, the Inner and Outer Circle routes formed the only link between the eastern and western halves of the Victorian Railways system. Prior to that, the link was via a street-level tramway along the edge of the CBD between Flinders and Spencer Streets, which was generally only used at night. Between December 1888 and May 1891, when the new Flinders Street Viaduct, connecting Flinders Street and Spencer Street stations, was in its final stages of construction, the Outer and Inner Circle lines was used to allow freight trains to bypass the construction site.

=== Replaced by direct line ===
In 1901, a new, direct line to Clifton Hill was opened from Princes Bridge station, at the southern edge of the CBD, through the inner-eastern suburb of Abbotsford. That allowed Heidelberg-bound trains to run more directly to their destination, removing the need for the reversing manoeuvre at Victoria Park. The Preston suburban service also ran via the new, direct line. However, Whittlesea trains continued to use the more indirect route via the Inner Circle, albeit only to and from Spencer Street station.

With the loss of the main line services on the Inner Circle after 1901, a series of "roundabout" services were trialled. By 1906, a regular steam-hauled service was established from Princes Bridge to North Fitzroy station via Clifton Hill and, by 1919, it was running every hour off-peak.

Electrification of the line between Royal Park and Clifton Hill stations was commissioned on 31 July 1921, but the Fitzroy branch was not electrified. Following electrification, passenger services were extended from North Fitzroy to North Carlton running at 15 minute headways, but from 18 September 1921 they were changed to every 20 minutes. Two trains on weekdays, and a larger number at weekends were extended to Royal Park station to serve patrons of the Melbourne Zoo.

The possibility of a revitalisation of the Inner Circle was canvassed in 1940, when the Ashworth Improvement Plan recommended a subway tunnel with five stations be built under the Melbourne CBD, from Flinders Street to the Inner Circle, with a proposed future subway from the first station to North Melbourne.

Traffic on the Inner Circle was discouraged by its circuitous route and by competition from the more direct trams to the city. Off-peak services were cut to every 30 minutes from 29 May 1944 but, from 4 December 1944, 20-minute headways were restored on Saturday and Sunday afternoons. The two remaining passenger services, from Princes Bridge to North Carlton and from Spencer Street to Whittlesea, were both withdrawn on 3 July 1948, and North Carlton and North Fitzroy stations were closed to passengers.

=== Freight only ===
After 1948, the Inner Circle line was used exclusively for freight trains serving sidings along the line and the goods yard at the end of the Fitzroy branch. The overhead wiring for electric trains was dismantled in 1961. Only the main feeder cables needed for Epping (now Mernda) line trains, and for shunting at the Royal Park end, were retained. Significant changes occurred in 1965, when the line was singled and both legs of the triangle at the eastern end of the line were closed. That left just a single track from Royal Park to Fitzroy for goods services.

In 1972 the 9:05 am Goods train from Melbourne yard was altered to depart at 5:50 am, and this change was made permanent from 20 November 1972. The schedule set an arrival time at Fitzroy at 7:30 am, with return departure from there at 9:35 am; but to keep the new schedule while accommodating increased loading the early morning trip was to be assisted by a second locomotive, pushing from the rear, from Melbourne Yard to Royal Park.

The line was occasionally used to hold special trains outside the suburban network; for instance on 24 November 1972 a train with two B class locomotives ran from Dimboola to Spencer Street, then one engine hauled the train to Royal Park station for Melbourne Zoo and onto the branch line, followed by the second engine running to collect the train for the empty return trip, followed by the first engine. The reverse arrangement was used to collect the passengers from Royal Park later the same day.

The line was officially closed on 31 July 1981.

== Today ==
The rails were removed after the final closure, except for some short sections at former level crossings which can still be seen. From Rushall to Royal Park stations the rail reserve has become a linear park which provides part of the Capital City Trail for cyclists, connecting the Merri Creek Trail to the Moonee Ponds Creek Trail in the network of shared use bicycle paths. Some signals and parts of level crossing gates also survive, with remaining overhead stanchions still carrying railway electric current between the Upfield and Mernda railway lines.

Of the three former station buildings, only North Carlton still stands, having been converted into a community centre. North Fitzroy station is now a slight rise in the walking and cycling path east of Nicholson Street. The path was realigned in 2002 to traverse the length of the former platform. The site of Fitzroy station has been redeveloped into a medium-density housing estate.

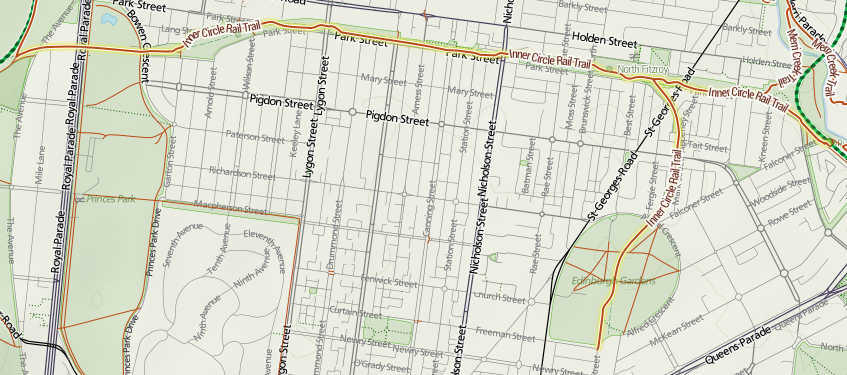
Map of the Inner Circle Rail Trail

== Station histories ==
Station	Opened	Closed	Age	Notes
Royal Park	9 September 1884		142 years	
North Carlton	8 May 1888	15 November 1948	60 years	Formerly Langridge Street
North Carlton	15 November 1948	29 November 1977	29 years	Freight only
North Fitzroy	8 May 1888	15 November 1948	60 years	Formerly Nicholson Street
North Fitzroy	15 November 1948	11 July 1981	32 years	Freight only
Fitzroy	8 May 1888	9 May 1892	4 years	
Fitzroy	9 May 1892	11 January 1981	88 years	Freight only
Rushall	1 January 1927		99 years	
Merri	8 October 1889		137 years	Formerly Northcote

== See also ==
- Outer Circle railway line
