= North Fitzroy railway station =

Former railway station in Melbourne

Coordinates: 37°46′49″S 144°58′48″E

North Fitzroy
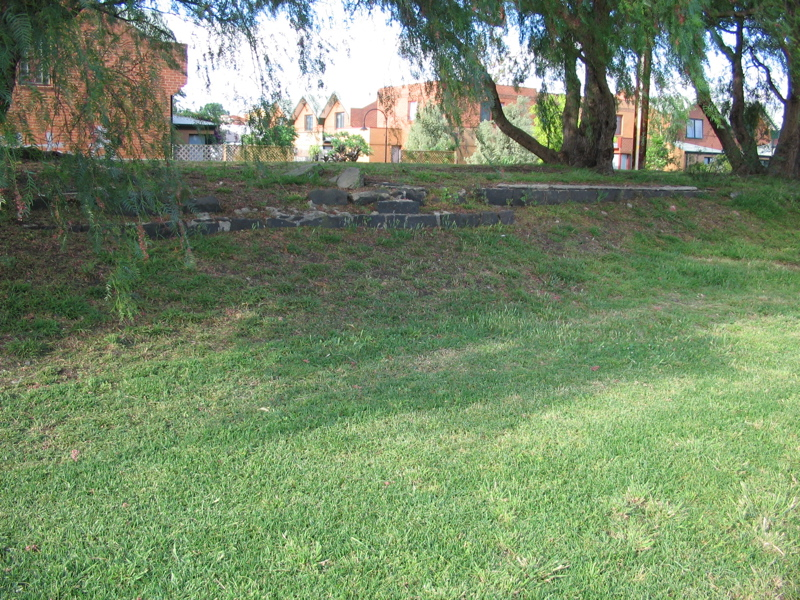
- Remains of North Fitzroy station in November 2005

General information
- Line: Inner Circle

Other information
- Status: Closed

History
- Opened: 1885
- Closed: 1981

Services
Preceding station	Disused railways	Following station
Rushall	Inner Circle line	North Carlton
	List of closed railway stations in Melbourne	
Location

North Fitzroy station is a former railway station that was located on the Inner Circle railway line in Melbourne, Australia. It was located east of Nicholson Street, on Rae and Park streets. The station was opened on 8 May 1885 and was originally known as Nicholson Street.

A branch line headed south from North Fitzroy Station towards Fitzroy Station. The Fitzroy branch had passenger services only until 1892, and it was thereafter used solely for goods trains. North Fitzroy station was closed to passengers in 1948, and to goods trains in 1981. Almost all traces of the station have been removed, except for some bluestone.
