= Rushall railway station =

Railway station in Melbourne, Australia

Rushall
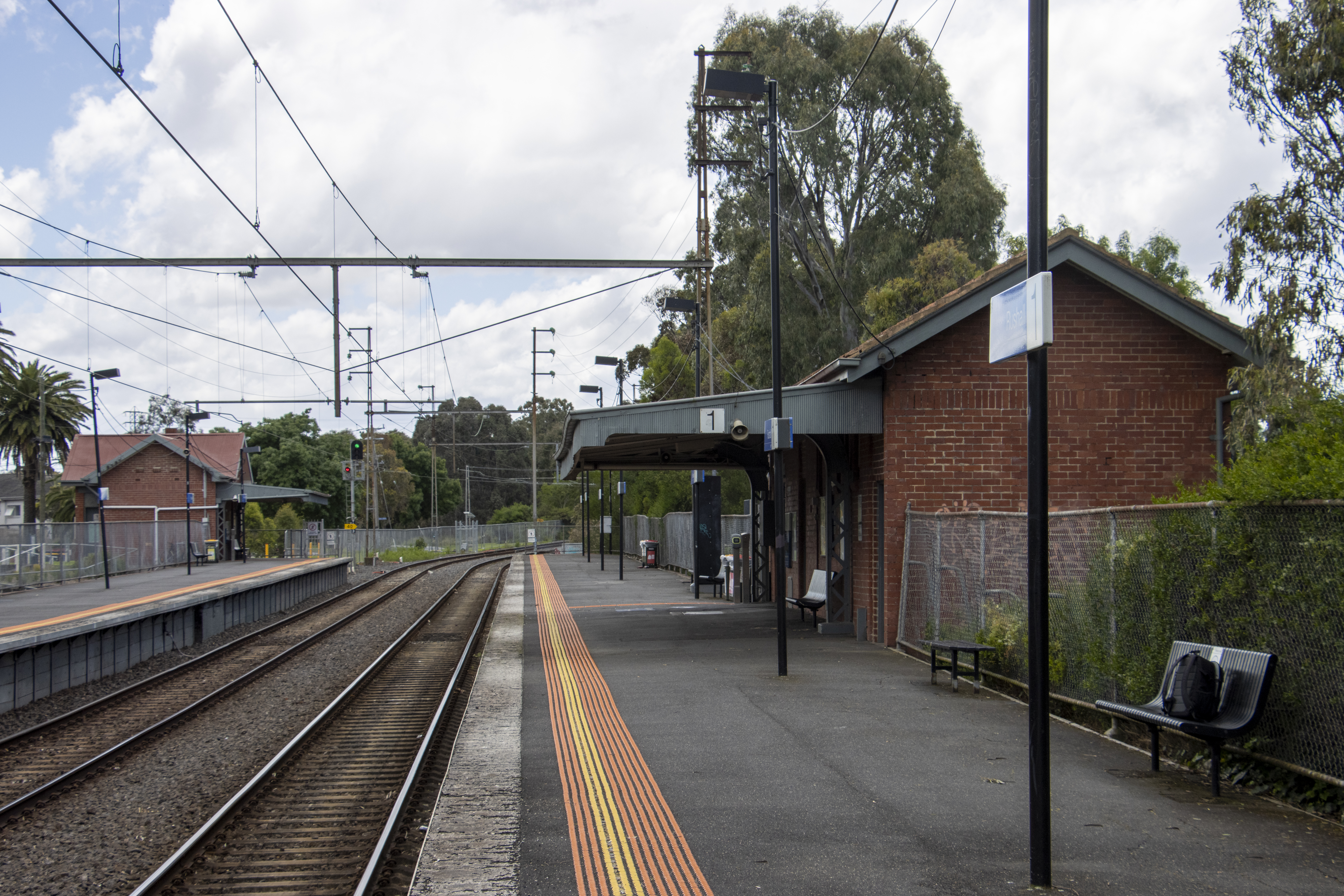
- North-west-bound view from Platform 1, November 2022

General information
- Location: Sumner Avenue, Fitzroy North, Victoria 3068; City of Yarra; Australia
- Coordinates: 37°47′00″S 144°59′31″E
- System: PTV commuter rail station
- Owner: VicTrack
- Operator: Metro Trains
- Line: Mernda
- Distance: 7.54 kilometres from Southern Cross
- Platforms: 2 side
- Tracks: 2
- Connections: Bus

Construction
- Structure type: Ground
- Parking: 5
- Accessible: No—steep ramp

Other information
- Status: Operational, unstaffed
- Station code: RUS
- Fare zone: Myki zone 1
- Website: Public Transport Victoria

History
- Opened: 1 January 1927; 99 years ago
- Electrified: July 1921 (1500 V DC overhead)

Passengers
- 2005–2006: 115,830
- 2006–2007: 123,832 ▲6.9%
- 2007–2008: 131,305 ▲6.03%
- 2008–2009: 143,079 ▲8.96%
- 2009–2010: 157,927 ▲10.38%
- 2010–2011: 160,404 ▲1.57%
- 2011–2012: 173,371 ▲8.08%
- 2012–2013: Not measured
- 2013–2014: 146,868 ▼15.3%
- 2014–2015: 151,286 ▲3%
- 2015–2016: 166,634 ▲10.14%
- 2016–2017: 153,094 ▼8.12%
- 2017–2018: 167,202 ▲9.22%
- 2018–2019: 158,350 ▼5.29%
- 2019–2020: 124,600 ▼21.3%
- 2020–2021: 69,400 ▼44.3%
- 2021–2022: 72,550 ▲4.53%

Services
Preceding station	Metro Trains	Following station
Clifton Hill towards Flinders Street	Mernda line	Merri towards Mernda
Track layout
Location

Rushall station is a railway station operated by Metro Trains Melbourne on the Mernda line, which is part of the Melbourne rail network. It serves the north-eastern suburb of Fitzroy North, in Melbourne, Victoria, Australia. It opened on 1 January 1927.

== History ==
Named after a nearby street, itself possibly named after a housing development in 1869, Rushall was also a station on the former Inner Circle line, which operated between Clifton Hill and Royal Park until July 1948.

Rushall is located next to Merri Creek, and is connected to Westgarth by a narrow, 80-metre-long footbridge for pedestrians and cyclists, crossing the Merri Creek as part of the Merri Creek Trail.

=== Incidents ===
On 6 February 2016, whilst operating a Flinders Street service, and negotiating the tightest curve on the metropolitan railway system, a trailer carriage of an X'Trapolis train derailed 100m north of the station, resulting in one injury. The line reopened the next day.

On 10 February 2016, another derailment occurred near Rushall, involving track maintenance machines, resulting in buses replacing trains between Clifton Hill and Bell for much of 11 February. The line partially reopened for evening peak later that day.

=== In music ===
Melbourne indie band Underground Lovers wrote a song named Rushall Station, about the quietness of the site, which then became the title track for an album. The station is also mentioned in Marcel Borrack's song Regent to Rushall.

In October 2016, Melbourne electronic music producer Arcadic released a single named after the station, titled Rushall. The artwork depicted Merri Creek, taken from the window of a train departing Rushall station.

== Platforms and services ==
Rushall has two side platforms and is served by Mernda line trains.

Rushall platform arrangement
Platform	Line	Destination	Service Type	Source
1	Mernda line	Flinders Street	All stations and limited express services	
2	Mernda line	Mernda	All stations	

== Transport links ==
Kinetic Melbourne operates two bus routes via Rushall station, under contract to Public Transport Victoria:

- 250 : Queen Street (Melbourne CBD) – La Trobe University Bundoora campus
- 251 : Queen Street (Melbourne CBD) – Northland Shopping Centre

== Gallery ==
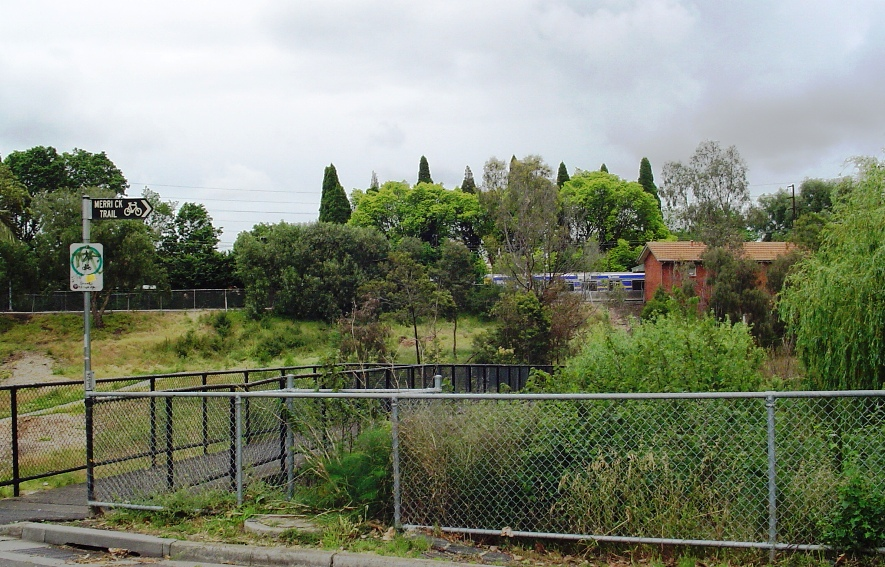
Merri Creek footbridge, which connects the station to the Merri Creek Trail and nearby Westgarth station, November 2004

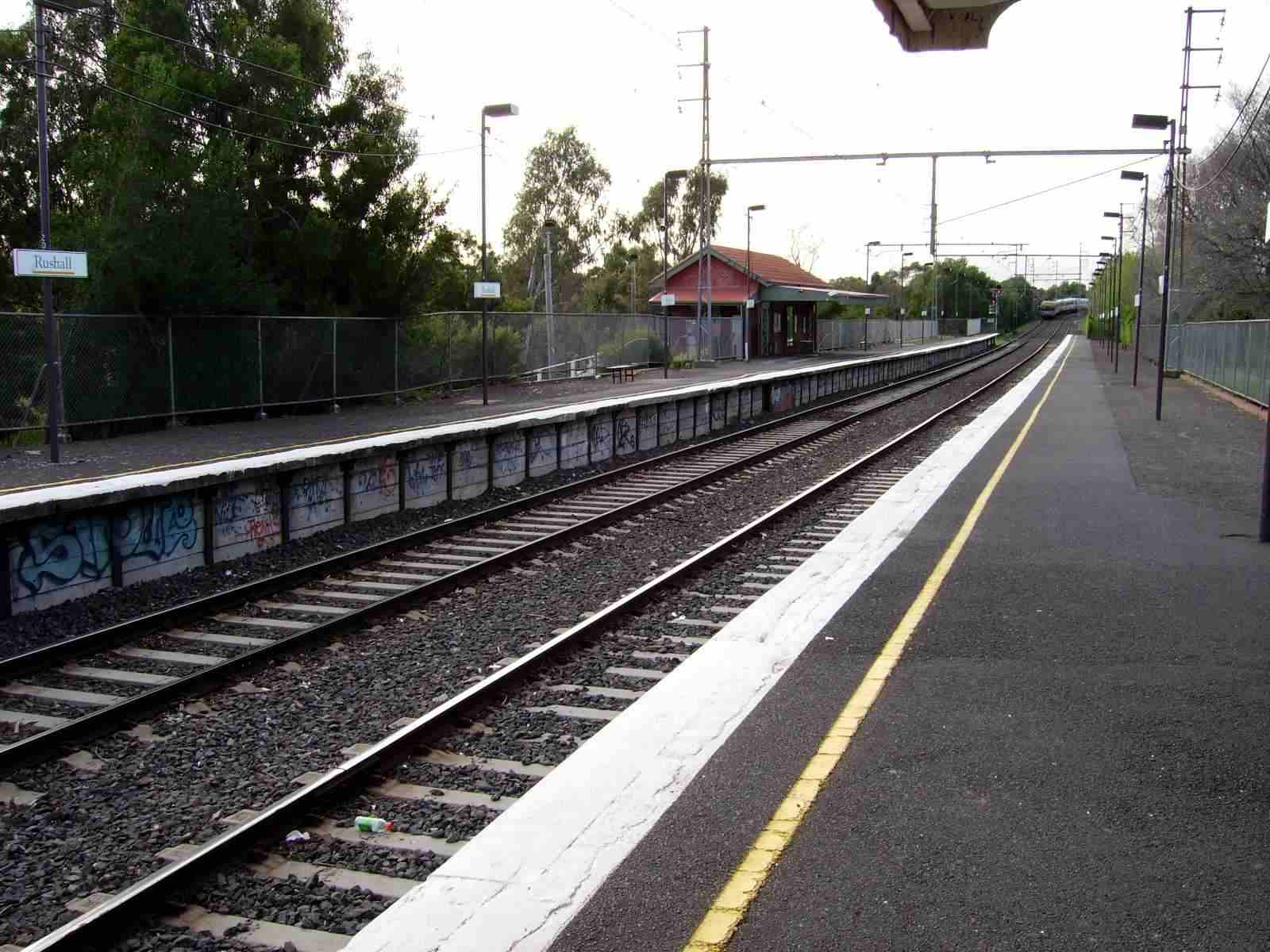
South-east-bound view from Platform 2, October 2005
