= CXT =

CXT can stand for:

- International CXT, a large luxury pick-up truck by Navistar International Corporation.
- Charters Towers Airport (IATA: CXT), Charters Towers, Queensland, Australia
- CxT, an abbreviation for customer experience transformation
- An abbreviation for the band Crazy Town
- An abbreviation for Christmas Island Time, the time zone in the Australian territory of Christmas Island (UTC+7)
- Croxton railway station, Melbourne
