= Collingwood railway station =

Railway station in Melbourne, Australia

Collingwood
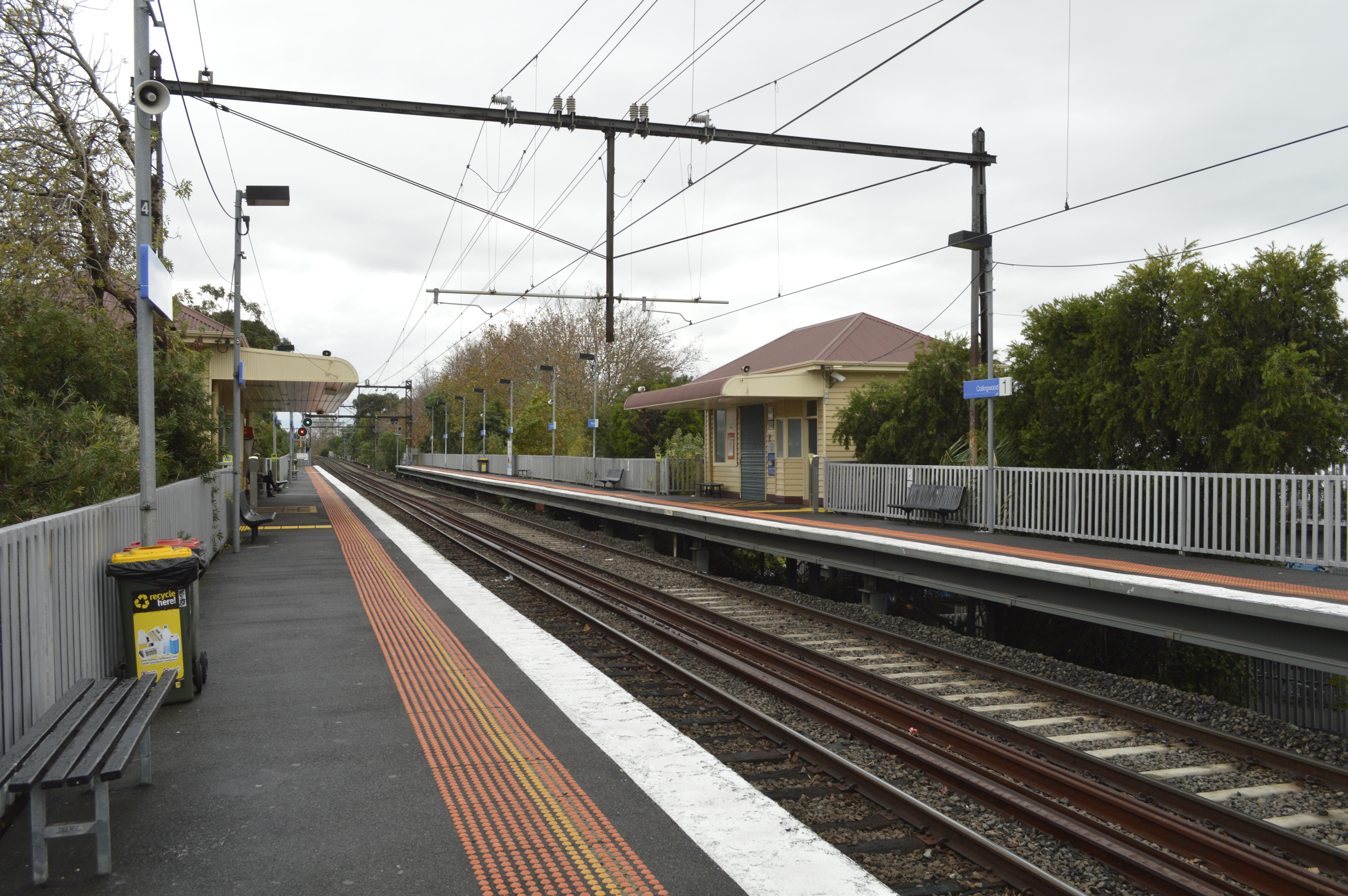
- Northbound view from Platform 2, May 2014

General information
- Location: Stanton Street, Abbotsford, Victoria 3067; City of Yarra; Australia
- Coordinates: 37°48′16″S 144°59′37″E
- System: PTV commuter rail station
- Owner: VicTrack
- Operator: Metro Trains
- Lines: Mernda; Hurstbridge
- Distance: 4.83 kilometres from Southern Cross
- Platforms: 2 side
- Tracks: 2
- Connections: Bus

Construction
- Structure type: Elevated
- Accessible: No—steep ramp

Other information
- Status: Operational, unstaffed
- Station code: CWD
- Fare zone: Myki zone 1
- Website: Public Transport Victoria

History
- Opened: 21 October 1901; 124 years ago
- Rebuilt: 1986-1987
- Electrified: July 1921 (1500 V DC overhead)
- Former names: Collingwood Town Hall (1901-1909)

Passengers
- 2005–2006: 275,409
- 2006–2007: 283,767 ▲3.03%
- 2007–2008: 326,378 ▲15.01%
- 2008–2009: 357,010 ▲9.38%
- 2009–2010: 376,822 ▲5.54%
- 2010–2011: 376,323 ▼0.13%
- 2011–2012: 356,311 ▼5.32%
- 2012–2013: Not measured
- 2013–2014: 384,016 ▲7.78%
- 2014–2015: 437,628 ▲13.96%
- 2015–2016: 523,295 ▲19.57%
- 2016–2017: 533,767 ▲2%
- 2017–2018: 537,610 ▲0.72%
- 2018–2019: 564,450 ▲4.99%
- 2019–2020: 460,950 ▼18.34%
- 2020–2021: 221,100 ▼52%
- 2021–2022: 248,400 ▲12.34%
- 2022–2023: 413,050 ▲66.28%
- 2023–2024: 488,050 ▲18.16%
- 2024–2025: 487,500 ▼0.11%

Services
| Preceding station | Metro Trains | Following station |
|---|---|---|
| North Richmond towards Flinders Street | Mernda line | Victoria Park towards Mernda |
| North Richmond towards Flinders Street | Hurstbridge line | Victoria Park towards Hurstbridge |
Track layout
Location

Collingwood station is a railway station operated by Metro Trains Melbourne on the Mernda and Hurstbridge lines, both part of the Melbourne rail network. It serves the north-eastern suburb of Abbotsford, in Melbourne, Victoria, Australia. Collingwood is an elevated unstaffed station, featuring two side platforms. The station opened on 21 October 1901 and was reconstructed in 1987.

Initially opened as Collingwood Town Hall, the station was given its current name on 1 May 1909.

Although it is named after the suburb of Collingwood, and is adjacent to the former Collingwood Town Hall, the station is actually located in the neighbouring suburb of Abbotsford.

== History ==
Collingwood station opened on 21 October 1901, along with the direct line between Princes Bridge station and Collingwood.

During 1986 and 1987, the station buildings and platforms were rebuilt, and were in use by 7 September 1987.

== Platforms and services ==
Collingwood station has two side platforms and is served by Mernda and Hurstbridge line trains.

Collingwood platform arrangement
| Platform | Line | Destination | Service Type | Source |
|---|---|---|---|---|
| 1 | Mernda line Hurstbridge line | Flinders Street | All stations | |
| 2 | Mernda line Hurstbridge line | Reservoir, Epping, Mernda, Macleod, Greensborough, Eltham or Hurstbridge | All stations and limited express services | |

== Transport links ==
Kinetic Melbourne operates twelve bus routes via Collingwood station, under contract to Public Transport Victoria:

- 246 : Elsternwick station – Clifton Hill
- 302 : Melbourne CBD (Lonsdale Street) – Box Hill station
- 303 : Melbourne CBD (Queen Street) – Ringwood North
- 304 : Melbourne CBD (Lonsdale Street) – Westfield Doncaster
- 305 : Melbourne CBD (Lonsdale Street) – The Pines Shopping Centre (peak-hour only)
- 309 : Melbourne CBD (Queen Street) – Donvale
- 318 : Melbourne CBD (Lonsdale Street) – Deep Creek Reserve (Doncaster East)
- 350 : Melbourne CBD (Queen Street) – La Trobe University Bundoora campus
- SmartBus 905 : Melbourne CBD (Lonsdale Street) – The Pines Shopping Centre
- SmartBus 906 : Melbourne CBD (Lonsdale Street) – Warrandyte
- SmartBus 907 : Melbourne CBD (Lonsdale Street) – Mitcham station
- SmartBus 908 : Melbourne CBD (Lonsdale Street) – The Pines Shopping Centre (peak-hour only)
