= Hawkstowe railway station =

Railway station in Melbourne, Australia

Hawkstowe
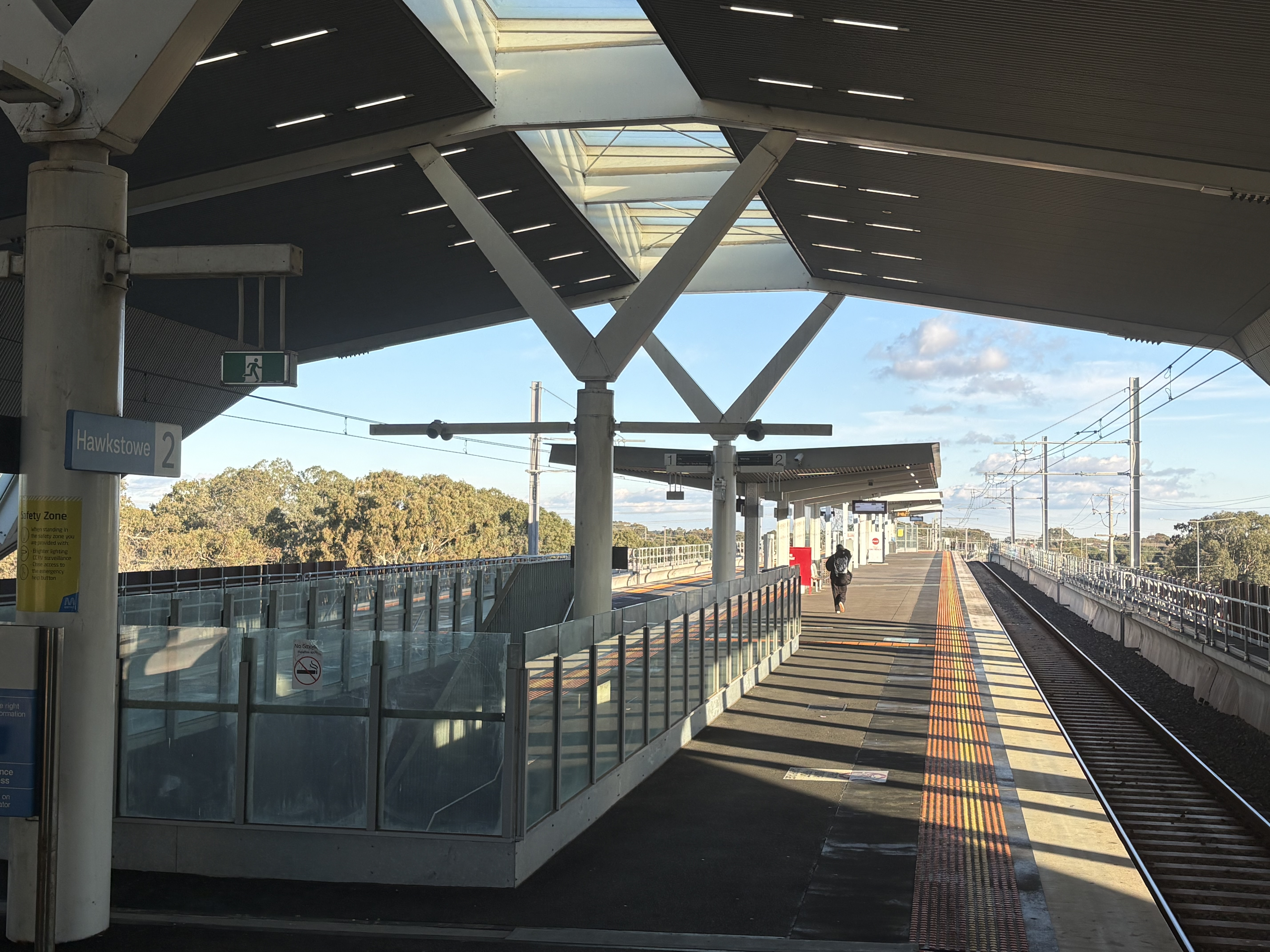
- Southbound view from Platform 2 June 2026

General information
- Location: Hawkstowe Parade, South Morang, Victoria 3752; City of Whittlesea; Australia
- Coordinates: 37°37′18″S 145°05′51″E
- System: PTV commuter rail station
- Owner: VicTrack
- Operator: Metro Trains
- Line: Mernda
- Distance: 30.73 kilometres from Southern Cross
- Platforms: 2 (1 island)
- Tracks: 2
- Connections: Bus

Construction
- Structure type: Elevated
- Parking: 350 bays
- Cycle facilities: Yes
- Accessible: Yes—step free access

Other information
- Status: Operational, host station
- Station code: HWS
- Fare zone: Myki zone 2
- Website: Public Transport Victoria

History
- Opened: 26 August 2018; 8 years ago
- Electrified: July 2018 (1500 V DC overhead)

Passengers
- 2018–2019: 193,600
- 2019–2020: 181,900 ▼6.04%
- 2020–2021: 70,900 ▼61.02%
- 2021–2022: 87,950 ▲24.04%
- 2022–2023: 159,150 ▲44.74%
- 2023–2024: 184,850 ▲16.15%
- 2024–2025: 208,500 ▲12.79%

Services
Preceding station	Metro Trains	Following station
Middle Gorge towards Flinders Street	Mernda line	Mernda Terminus
Track layout
Location

Hawkstowe station is a railway station operated by Metro Trains Melbourne on the Mernda line, part of the Melbourne rail network. It serves the north-eastern Melbourne suburb of South Morang in Victoria, Australia. Hawkstowe is an elevated host station, featuring an island platform with two faces. The station opened on 26 August 2018 with the reopening of the line from South Morang to Mernda.

== History ==
Hawkstowe station opened on 26 August 2018, when the line was re-extended from South Morang along the alignment of the former Whittlesea line to Mernda as part of the Mernda Rail extension project. The station was not originally planned as part of the project. However, as a result of pressure from the community, the station was included in the plan for the extension. It is elevated, providing views of the surrounding area, including the adjacent Plenty Gorge Park.

The name of the station comes from a nearby property named Hawkstowe, once owned by J.H. Walker, who was the founder of Walker's Biscuits.

== Platforms and services ==
Hawkstowe station has one island platform with two faces. It is serviced by Metro Trains' Mernda line services.

Hawkstowe platform arrangement
Platform	Line	Destination	Service Type	Source
1	Mernda line	Flinders Street	All stations and limited express services	
2	Mernda line	Mernda	All stations	

== Transport links ==
Kinetic Melbourne operates three bus routes via Hawkstowe station, under contract to Transport Victoria:

- 382 : Whittlesea – Northland Shopping Centre
- 386 : Mernda station – RMIT University Bundoora campus
- 387 : Mernda station – RMIT University Bundoora campus
