= West Richmond railway station =

Railway station in Melbourne, Australia

West Richmond
- Southbound view from Platform 2, November 2026

General information
- Location: Muir Street, Richmond, Victoria 3121; City of Yarra; Australia
- Coordinates: 37°48′54″S 144°59′29″E
- System: PTV commuter rail station
- Owner: VicTrack
- Operator: Metro Trains
- Lines: Mernda; Hurstbridge
- Distance: 3.66 kilometres from Southern Cross
- Platforms: 2 side
- Tracks: 2
- Connections: Bus

Construction
- Structure type: Ground
- Accessible: Yes—step free access

Other information
- Status: Operational, unstaffed
- Station code: WRM
- Fare zone: Myki zone 1
- Website: Public Transport Victoria

History
- Opened: 21 October 1901; 125 years ago
- Electrified: July 1921 (1500 V DC overhead)

Passengers
- 2005–2006: 199,656
- 2006–2007: 206,260 ▲3.3%
- 2007–2008: 229,608 ▲11.32%
- 2008–2009: 257,459 ▲12.13%
- 2009–2010: 275,671 ▲7.07%
- 2010–2011: 323,192 ▲17.24%
- 2011–2012: 329,447 ▲1.93%
- 2012–2013: Not measured
- 2013–2014: 396,529 ▲20.36%
- 2014–2015: 412,769 ▲4.09%
- 2015–2016: 491,141 ▲18.98%
- 2016–2017: 461,931 ▼5.95%
- 2017–2018: 470,140 ▲1.77%
- 2018–2019: 510,950 ▲8.68%
- 2019–2020: 436,500 ▼14.57%
- 2020–2021: 265,250 ▼39.2%
- 2021–2022: 271,450 ▲2.33%

Services
Preceding station	Metro Trains	Following station
Jolimont towards Flinders Street	Mernda line	North Richmond towards Mernda
Jolimont towards Flinders Street	Hurstbridge line	North Richmond towards Hurstbridge
Track layout
Location

West Richmond station is a railway station operated by Metro Trains Melbourne on the Mernda and Hurstbridge lines, both part of the Melbourne rail network. It serves the eastern Melbourne suburb of Richmond in Victoria, Australia. West Richmond is a ground level unstaffed station, featuring two side platforms. It opened on 21 October 1901.

The station was opened as a part of line extension from Princes Bridge to Collingwood.

== Platforms and services ==
West Richmond has two side platforms. It is serviced by Metro Trains' Mernda and Hurstbridge line services.

West Richmond platform arrangement
Platform	Line	Destination	Service Type	Source
1	Mernda line Hurstbridge line	Flinders Street	All stations	
2	Mernda line Hurstbridge line	Reservoir, Epping, Mernda, Macleod, Greensborough, Eltham or Hurstbridge	All stations and limited express services	

== Transport links ==
Kinetic Melbourne operates one bus route via West Richmond station, under contract to Public Transport Victoria:

- 246 : Elsternwick station – Clifton Hill
