= Ruthven railway station =

Railway station in Melbourne, Australia

Ruthven
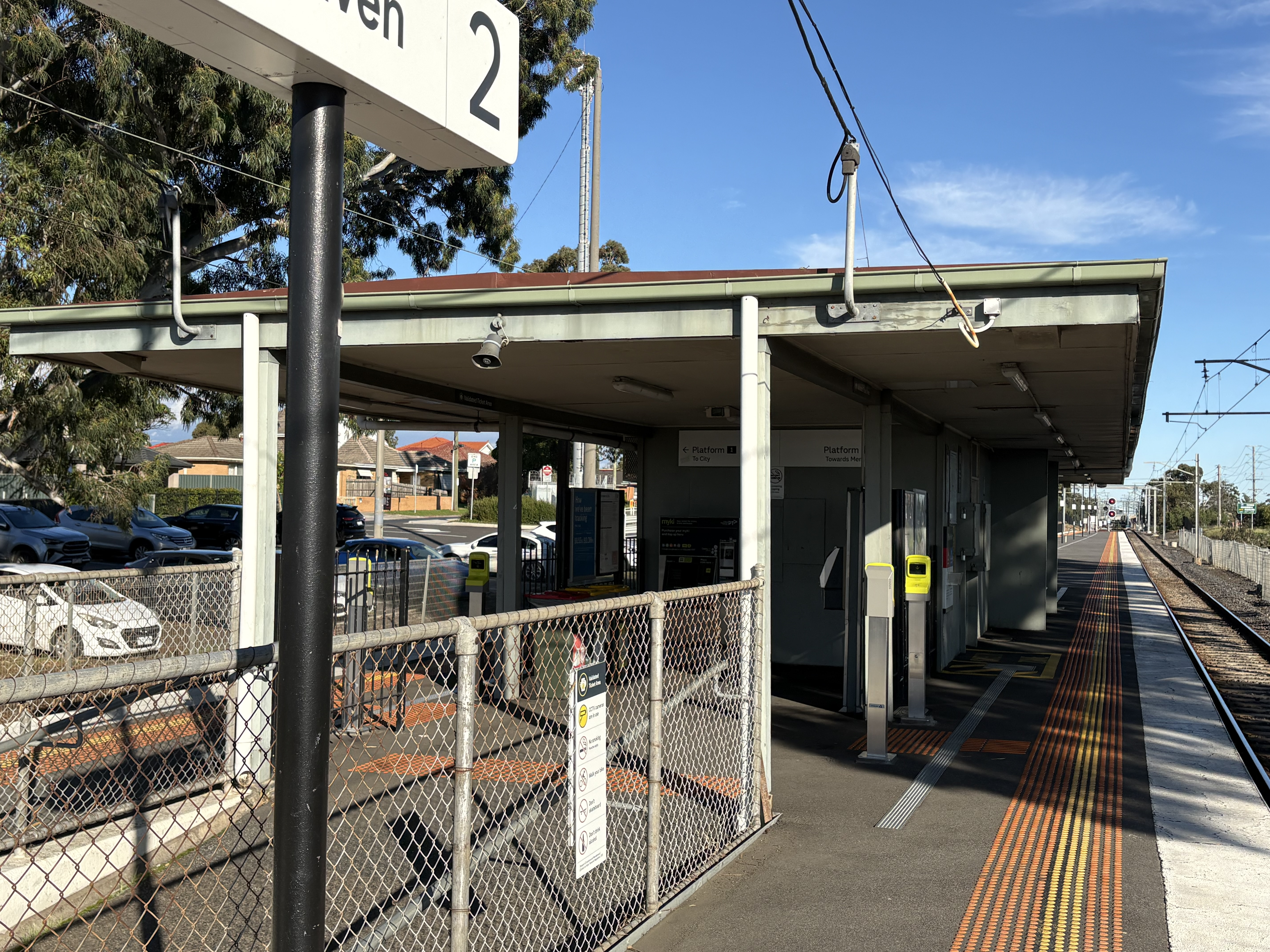
- Southbound view from Platform 2, June 2026

General information
- Location: High Street, Reservoir, Victoria 3073; City of Darebin; Australia
- Coordinates: 37°42′28″S 145°00′34″E
- System: PTV commuter rail station
- Owner: VicTrack
- Operator: Metro Trains
- Line: Mernda
- Distance: 15.95 kilometres from Southern Cross
- Platforms: 2 (1 island)
- Tracks: 2
- Connections: Bus

Construction
- Structure type: Ground
- Parking: 80
- Accessible: No—steep ramp

Other information
- Status: Operational, unstaffed
- Station code: RUT
- Fare zone: Myki zone 2
- Website: Public Transport Victoria

History
- Opened: 5 August 1963; 63 years ago
- Electrified: December 1929 (1500 V DC overhead)

Passengers
- 2005–2006: 140,727
- 2006–2007: 154,873 ▲10.05%
- 2007–2008: 192,765 ▲24.46%
- 2008–2009: 313,836 ▲62.8%
- 2009–2010: 274,917 ▼12.4%
- 2010–2011: 273,027 ▼0.68%
- 2011–2012: 258,962 ▼5.15%
- 2012–2013: Not measured
- 2013–2014: 205,369 ▼20.7%
- 2014–2015: 250,925 ▲22.18%
- 2015–2016: 340,791 ▲35.81%
- 2016–2017: 373,097 ▲9.47%
- 2017–2018: 407,505 ▲9.22%
- 2018–2019: 409,500 ▲0.49%
- 2019–2020: 334,100 ▼18.4%
- 2020–2021: 162,400 ▼51.4%
- 2021–2022: 157,350 ▼3.1%
- 2022–2023: 237,150 ▲50.71%

Services
Preceding station	Metro Trains	Following station
Reservoir towards Flinders Street	Mernda line	Keon Park towards Mernda
Track layout
Location

Ruthven station is a railway station operated by Metro Trains Melbourne on the Mernda line, which is part of the Melbourne rail network. It serves the northern suburb of Reservoir, in Melbourne, Victoria, Australia. It opened on 5 August 1963.

== History ==
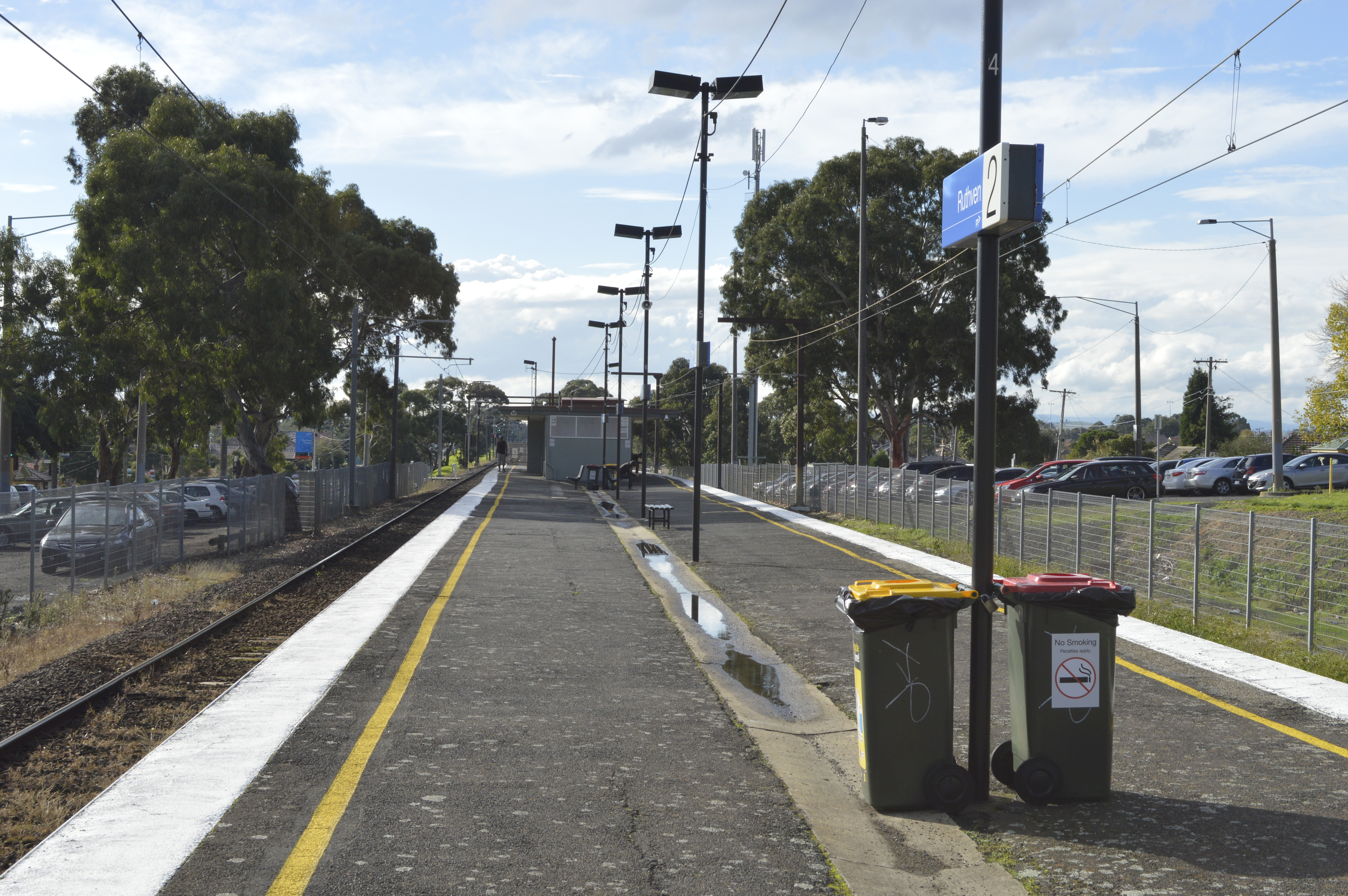
Northbound view from Platform 2, May 2014

Ruthven station was named after William Ruthven, who served in both world wars (winning the Victoria Cross in World War I), and was later a member of the Victorian Parliament, representing Preston and then Reservoir. A ceremony was held a day earlier to celebrate the opening, and dignitaries attending included Transport Minister Edward Meagher, and the opposition leader in the Victorian Legislative Council, John Galbally. When it opened, the station building was painted bright red.

In 2022, Ruthven received a $1.03 million upgrade, as part of the Victoria's Big Build project, including improved facilities and lighting, resurfacing the asphalt on the island platform, new PTV station signage with the red "Clifton Hill group" colour, and a substation constructed opposite Platform 1.

== Platforms and services ==
Ruthven has one island platform with two faces and is served by Mernda line trains.

Ruthven platform arrangement
Platform	Line	Destination	Service Type	Source
1	Mernda line	Flinders Street	All stations and limited express services	
2	Mernda line	Mernda	All stations	

== Transport links ==
Kinetic Melbourne operates one bus route via Ruthven station, under contract to Transport Victoria:

- 555 : Pacific Epping – Northland Shopping Centre
