= Thornbury railway station, Melbourne =

Railway station in Melbourne, Australia

Thornbury
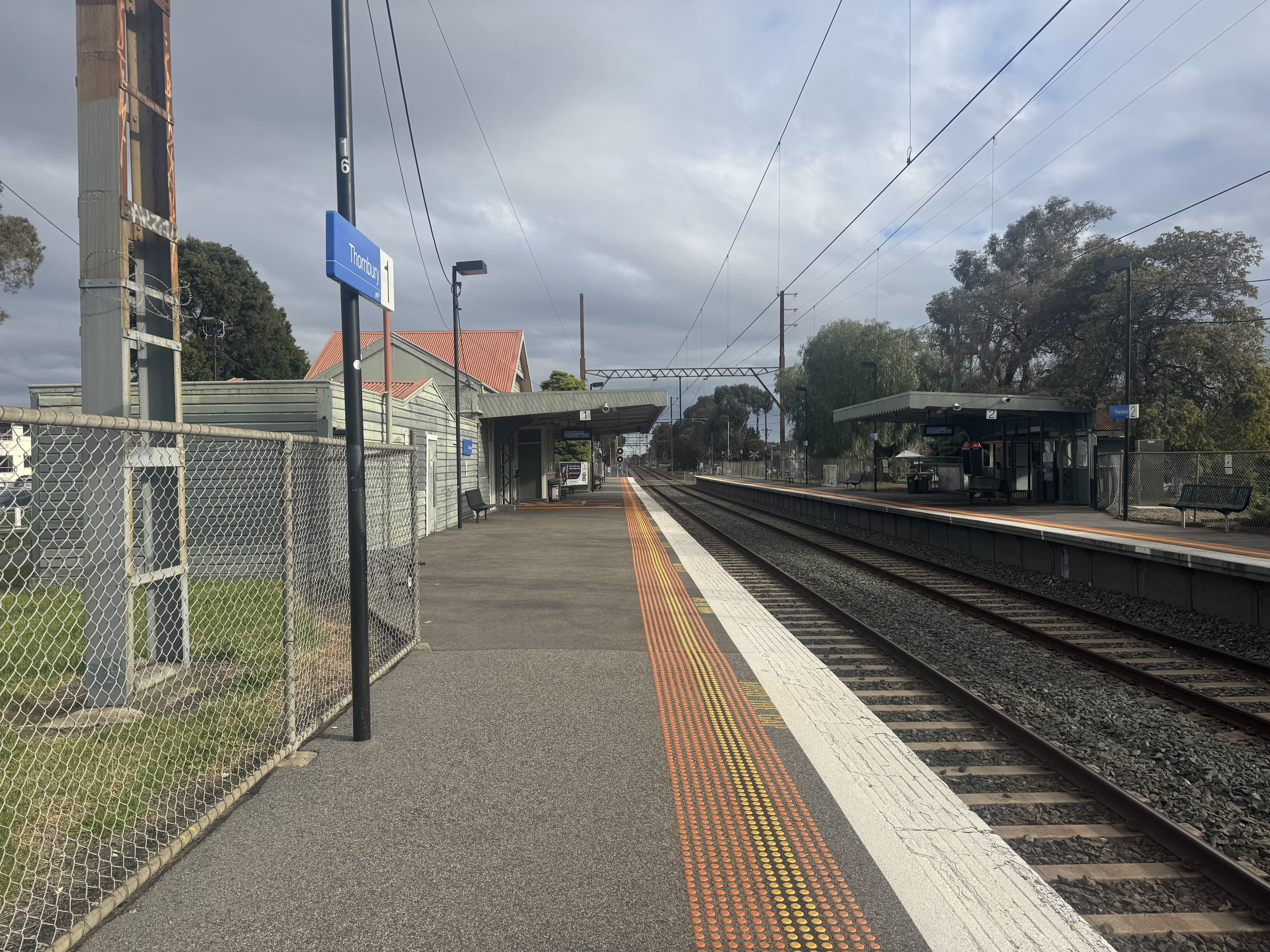
- Southbound view from Platform 1, September 2025

General information
- Location: Ethel Street, Thornbury, Victoria 3071; City of Darebin; Australia
- Coordinates: 37°45′19″S 144°59′54″E
- System: PTV commuter rail station
- Owner: VicTrack
- Operator: Metro Trains
- Line: Mernda
- Distance: 10.62 kilometres from Southern Cross
- Platforms: 2 side
- Tracks: 2
- Connections: Tram

Construction
- Structure type: Ground
- Cycle facilities: Yes
- Accessible: Yes—step free access

Other information
- Status: Operational, unstaffed
- Station code: TBY
- Fare zone: Myki zone 1
- Website: Public Transport Victoria

History
- Opened: 8 October 1889; 136 years ago
- Electrified: July 1921 (1500 V DC overhead)

Passengers
- 2005–2006: 317,260
- 2006–2007: 347,558 ▲9.54%
- 2007–2008: 377,006 ▲8.47%
- 2008–2009: 448,927 ▲19.07%
- 2009–2010: 464,390 ▲3.44%
- 2010–2011: 458,635 ▼1.24%
- 2011–2012: 430,616 ▼6.11%
- 2012–2013: Not measured
- 2013–2014: 470,743 ▲9.32%
- 2014–2015: 472,186 ▲0.3%
- 2015–2016: 525,717 ▲11.33%
- 2016–2017: 531,610 ▲1.12%
- 2017–2018: 552,342 ▲3.9%
- 2018–2019: 592,300 ▲7.23%
- 2019–2020: 544,200 ▼8.12%
- 2020–2021: 190,250 ▼65.04%
- 2021–2022: 205,700 ▲8.12%
- 2022–2023: 340,700 ▲65.63%

Services
Preceding station	Metro Trains	Following station
Croxton towards Flinders Street	Mernda line	Bell towards Mernda
Track layout
Location

Thornbury station is a railway station operated by Metro Trains Melbourne on the Mernda line, which is part of the Melbourne rail network. It serves the north-eastern suburb of Thornbury, in Melbourne, Victoria, Australia. Thornbury station is a ground-level unstaffed station, featuring two side platforms. It opened on 8 October 1889.

== History ==
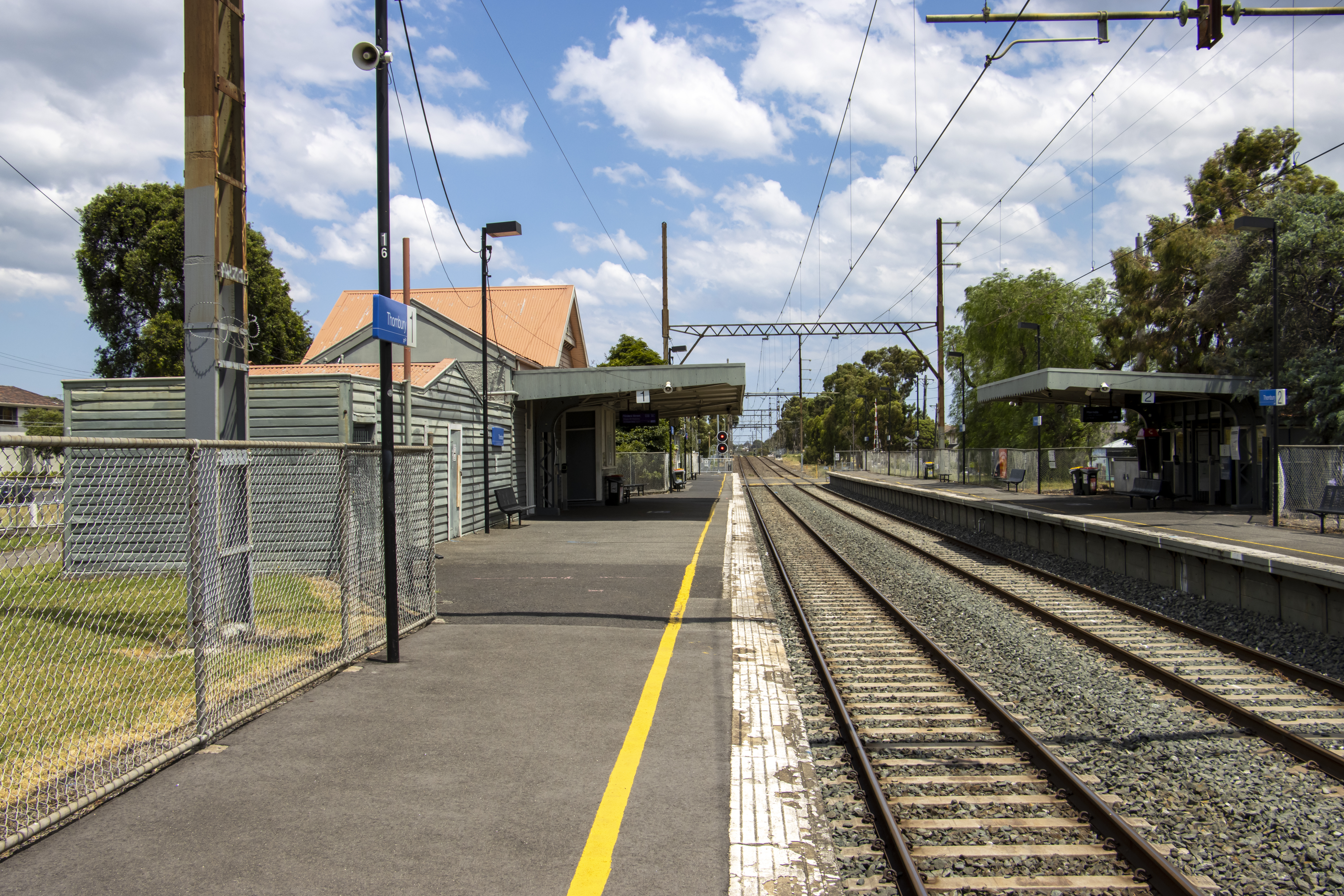
Thornbury Station Platform 1, with the original 1889 station building, January 2023

Thornbury station opened on 8 October 1889, when the Inner Circle line was extended from North Fitzroy to Reservoir, Thornbury station, like the suburb itself, is named after the Thornbury Park Estate, named after a farm owned by settler Job Smith. Smith named the farm after his birthplace in England.

In 1973, both platforms were extended at the down end of the station.

During October 1987, the double line block system between Thornbury and Northcote was abolished, and replaced with three-position signalling, with all two position signals between Thornbury and Merri also abolished. A number of signal posts were also abolished during this time.

In early 1988, boom barriers replaced interlocked gates at the Hutton Street level crossing, located at the up end of the station.

Announced as part of a $21.9 million package in the 2022/23 Victorian State Budget, Thornbury, alongside other stations, will receive accessibility upgrades, the installation of CCTV, and platform shelters.

== Platforms and services ==
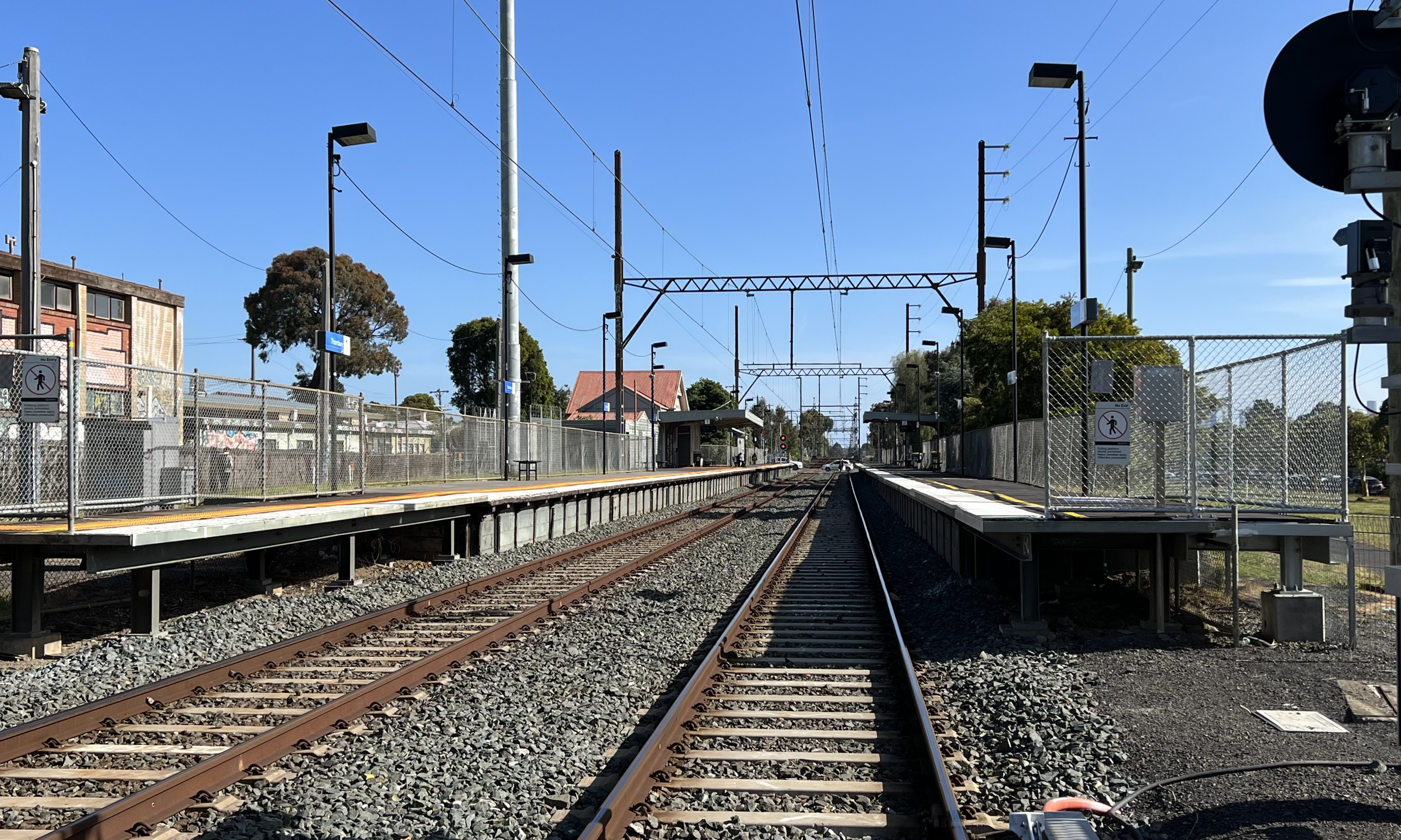
Both station platforms, viewed from the northern pedestrian railway crossing, November 2023

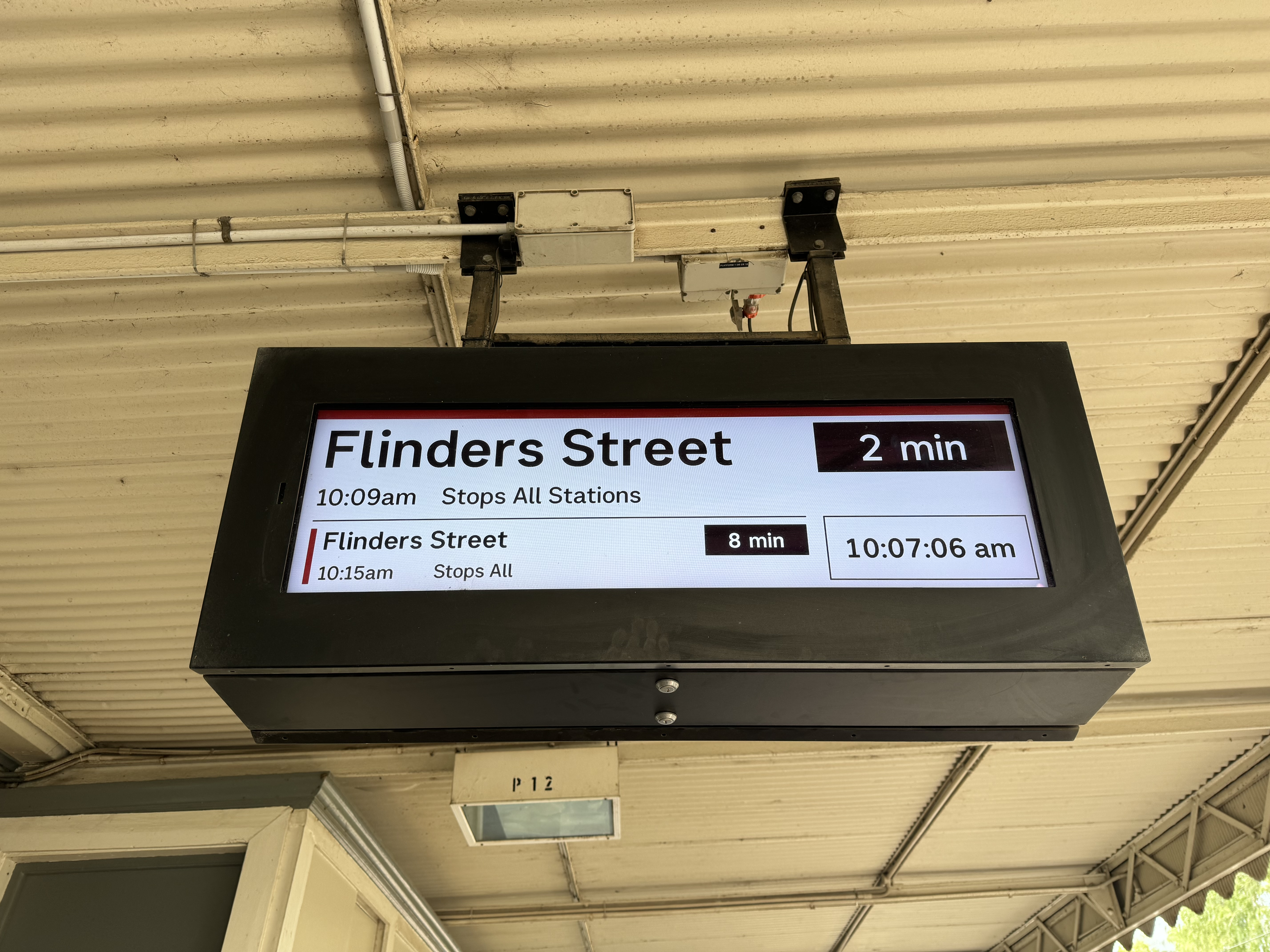
A PID on Platform 1 displaying a Flinders Street service, July 2024

Thornbury has two side platforms. It is serviced by Metro Trains' Mernda line services.

Thornbury platform arrangement
Platform	Line	Destination	Service Type	Source
1	Mernda line	Flinders Street	All stations and limited express services	
2	Mernda line	Mernda	All stations	

== Transport links ==
Yarra Trams operates two routes via Thornbury station:

- : West Preston – Victoria Harbour (Docklands)
- : Bundoora RMIT – Waterfront City (Docklands)
