= Middle Gorge railway station =

Railway station in Melbourne, Australia

Middle Gorge
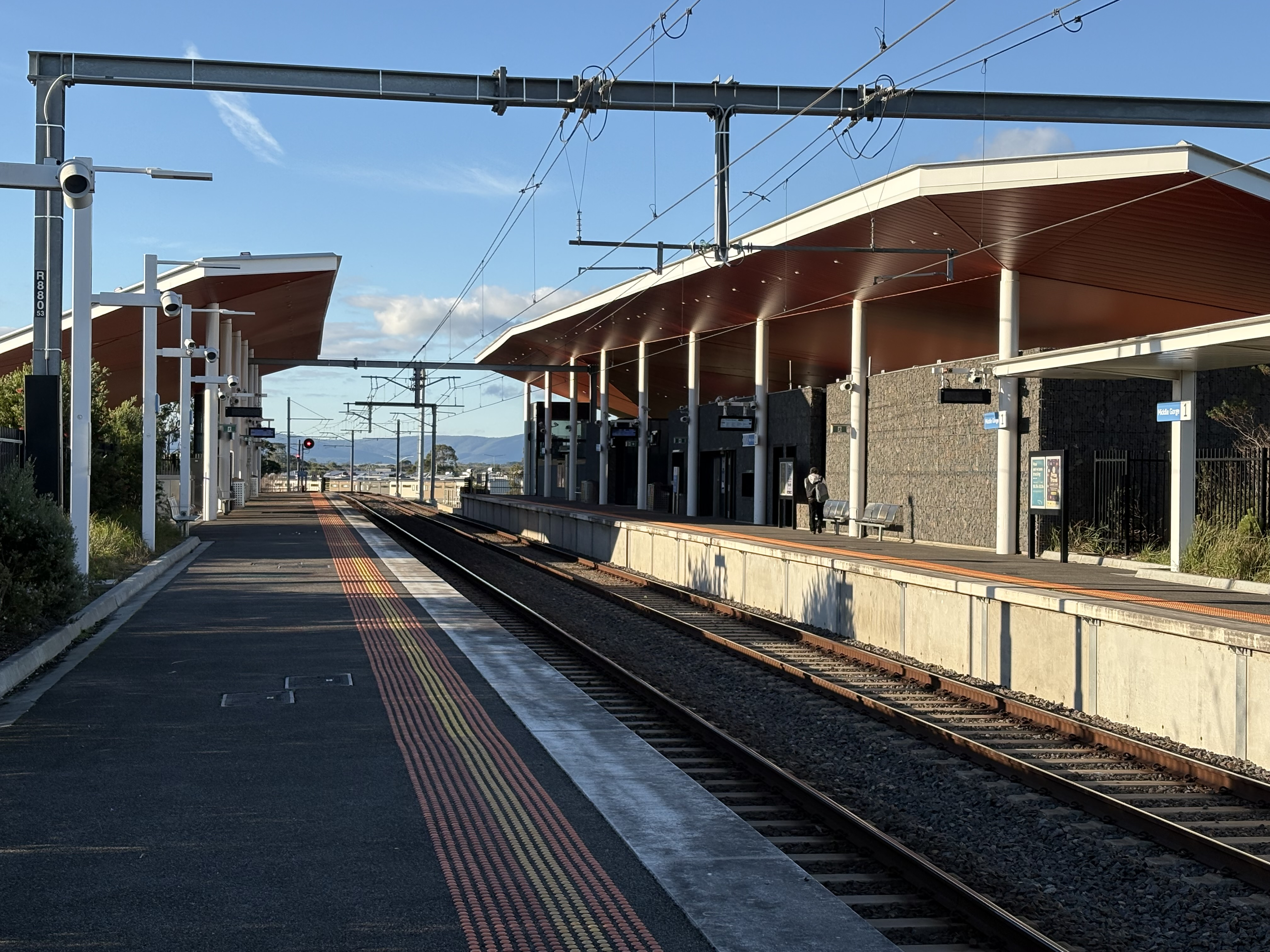
- Northeast bound view from Platform 2 June 2026

General information
- Location: Williamsons Road, South Morang, Victoria 3752; City of Whittlesea; Australia
- Coordinates: 37°38′39″S 145°05′31″E
- System: PTV commuter rail station
- Owner: VicTrack
- Operator: Metro Trains
- Lines: Mernda; Whittlesea (former)
- Distance: 28.34 kilometres from Southern Cross
- Platforms: 2 side
- Tracks: 2
- Connections: Bus

Construction
- Parking: 550
- Cycle facilities: Yes
- Accessible: Yes—step free access

Other information
- Status: Operational, unstaffed
- Station code: MMR
- Fare zone: Myki zone 2
- Website: Public Transport Victoria

History
- Opened: 23 December 1889; 136 years ago (South Morang); 26 August 2018; 8 years ago (Middle Gorge)
- Closed: 28 November 1959
- Electrified: July 2018 (1500 V DC overhead)
- Former names: South Morang (1889-1959); Marymede (provisionally)

Passengers
- 2018–2019: 192,700
- 2019–2020: 184,700 ▼4.15%
- 2020–2021: 103,900 ▼43.75%
- 2021–2022: 115,350 ▲11.02%
- 2022–2023: 188,600 ▲63.5%

Services
Preceding station	Metro Trains	Following station
South Morang towards Flinders Street	Mernda line	Hawkstowe towards Mernda
Former services
Preceding station	VicRail	Following station
Epping towards Thomastown	Whittlesea line	Mernda towards Whittlesea
List of closed railway stations in Melbourne
Track layout
Location

Middle Gorge station is a railway station operated by Metro Trains Melbourne on the Mernda line, part of the Melbourne rail network. It serves the north-eastern Melbourne suburb of South Morang in Victoria, Australia. Middle Gorge is a ground level unstaffed station, featuring two side platforms. It originally opened on 23 December 1889 as South Morang and closed with the Whittlesea line on 28 November 1959. The current station opened on 26 August 2018.

It is the only station between South Morang and Mernda that is not elevated, and the only station between Thomastown and Mernda that does not have an island platform.

== History ==
=== South Morang railway station (1889–1959) ===
The original South Morang opened in 1889 when the line from Reservoir was extended to Whittlesea. The station operated until the closure of the line beyond Lalor on 28 November 1959, following the electrification of the line to Lalor. The line to Epping was electrified and re-opened on 30 November 1964, and the remaining section of track, from Epping to Whittlesea, was dismantled in the 1970s, although the former right-of-way remained intact. All that remained of the original South Morang station was the platform mound.

A new South Morang station opened on 22 April 2012, as the terminus of an extension of the Epping line. The new station was two kilometres closer to Epping than the former station, arguably in Mill Park or Epping.

=== Middle Gorge (2018–present) ===
Middle Gorge opened near the approximate site of the original South Morang station on 26 August 2018, when the line was extended from South Morang to Mernda, as part of the Mernda Rail project. It was first announced as one of two new stations for the project, which was an extension of the South Morang line along the former Whittlesea line right-of-way. Hawkstowe was added to the project after community pressure.

The station was originally to be named Marymede, after the nearby Marymede Catholic College which is across the road from the station. However, this went against Victorian place-naming conventions, as it was named after a school. This caused public outrage for many reasons, mainly because its namesake Middle Gorge Park is located over 2 km from the station site. A letter sent from residents to the Victorian Government states that there was no consultation in the naming process, and that it does not accurately represent the station's location. Residents believe the station should be called "South Morang", whilst the current South Morang station be renamed to "Plenty Valley", in order to better reflect their locations.

== Platforms and services ==
Middle Gorge has two side platforms. It is serviced by Metro Trains' Mernda line services.

Middle Gorge platform arrangement
Platform	Line	Destination	Service Type	Source
1	Mernda line	Flinders Street	All stations and limited express services	
2	Mernda line	Mernda	All stations	

== Transport links ==
Kinetic Melbourne operates one bus route via Middle Gorge station, under contract to Transport Victoria:

- 383 : Mill Park Lakes Palisades Estate – University Hill

== Gallery ==
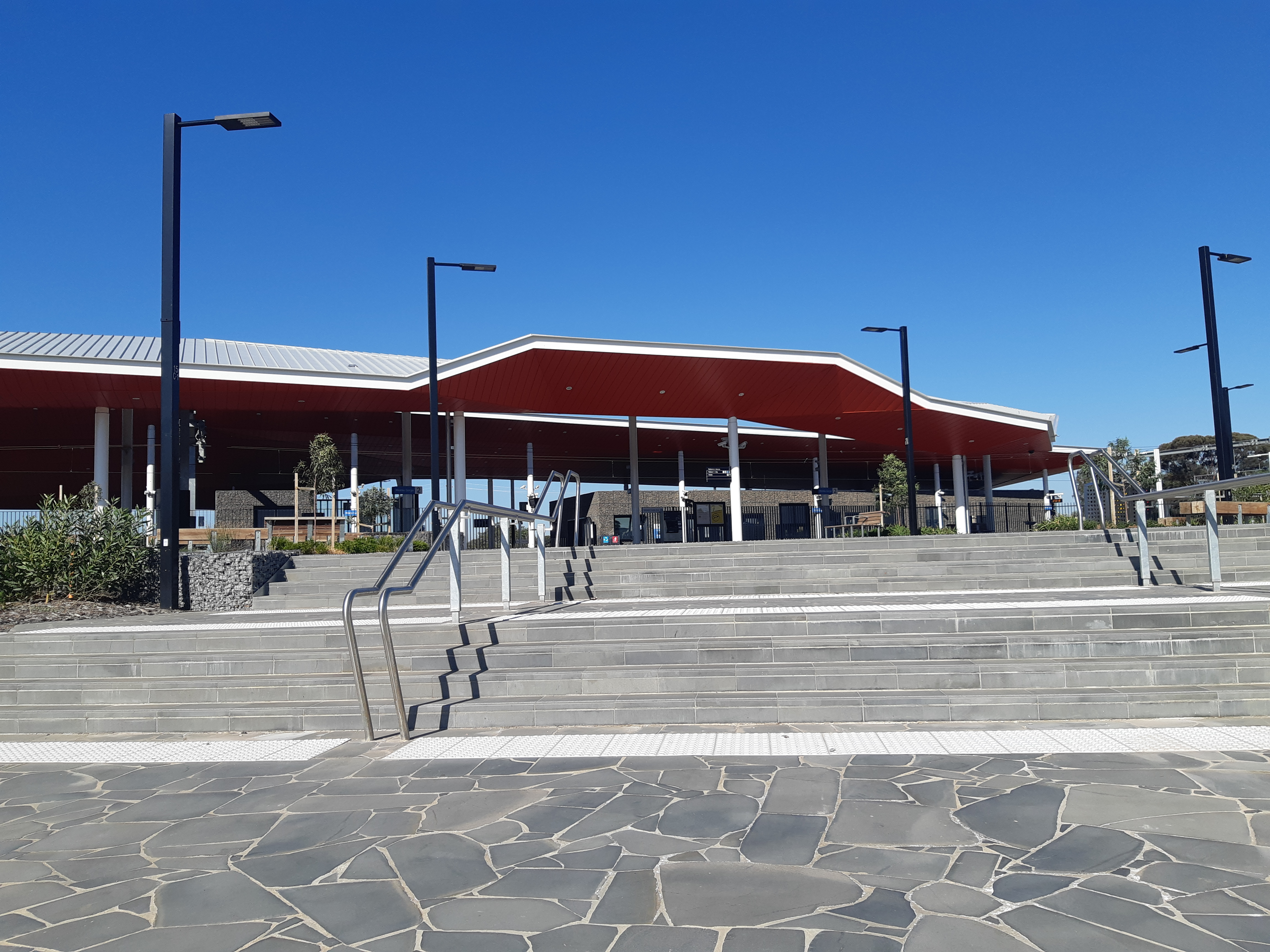
Building and entrance to Platform 2, May 2019
