= Keon Park railway station =

Railway station in Melbourne, Australia

Keon Park
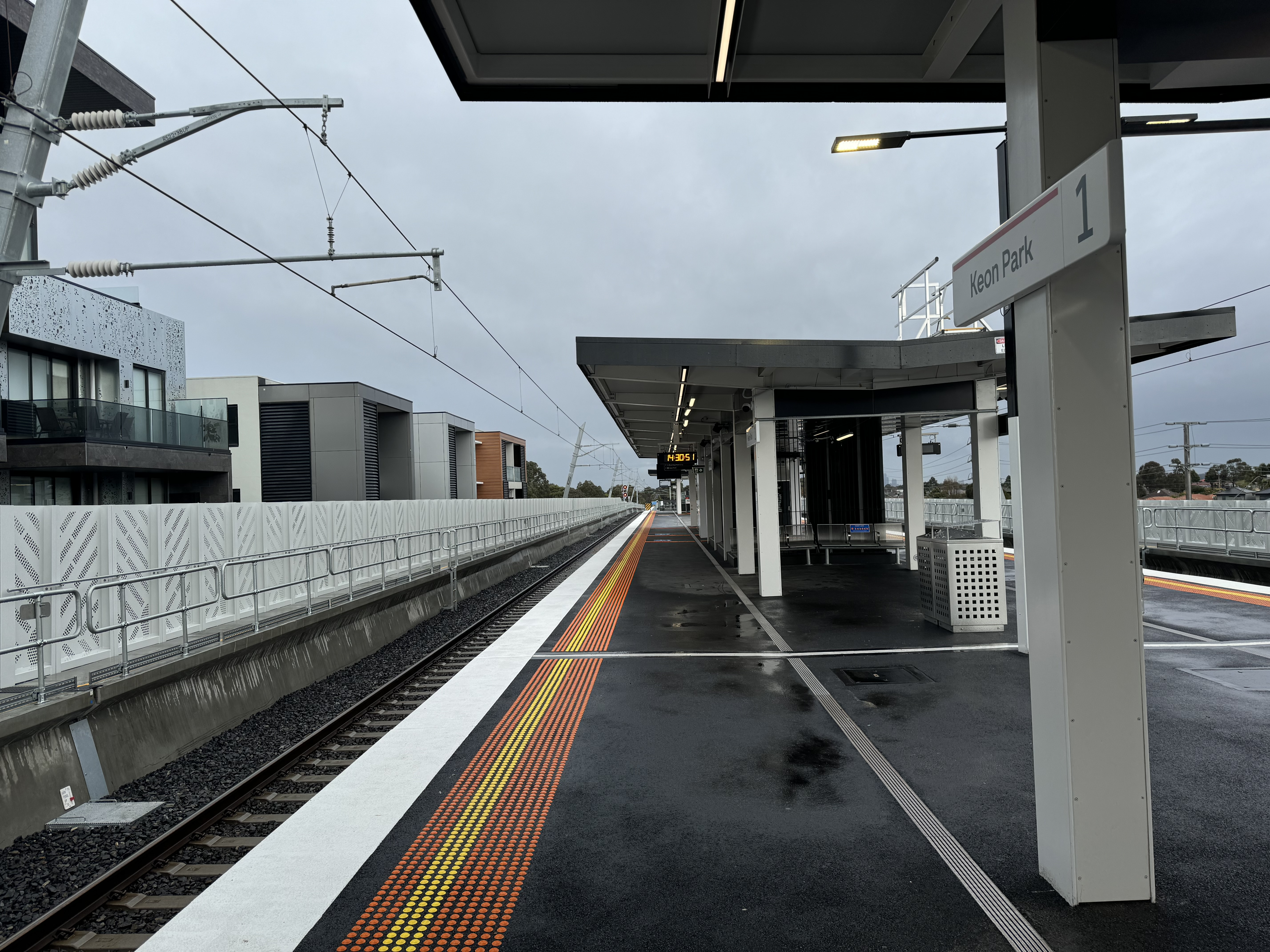
- Southbound view from Platform 1, July 2024

General information
- Location: High Street, Reservoir, Victoria 3073; City of Darebin; Australia
- Coordinates: 37°41′41″S 145°00′42″E
- System: PTV commuter rail station
- Owner: VicTrack
- Operator: Metro Trains
- Line: Mernda
- Distance: 17.54 kilometres from Southern Cross
- Platforms: 2 (1 island)
- Tracks: 2
- Connections: Bus

Construction
- Structure type: Elevated
- Parking: 154
- Accessible: Yes—step free access

Other information
- Status: Operational, unstaffed
- Station code: KPK
- Fare zone: Myki zone 2
- Website: Transport Victoria

History
- Opened: 16 December 1929; 96 years ago
- Rebuilt: 1983; 1988; 21 June 2024 (LXRP)
- Electrified: December 1929 (1500 V DC overhead)
- Former names: Keonpark (1929–1972)

Passengers
- 2005–2006: 200,689
- 2006–2007: 245,581 ▲22.36%
- 2007–2008: 274,090 ▲11.6%
- 2008–2009: 310,119 ▲13.14%
- 2009–2010: 318,443 ▲2.68%
- 2010–2011: 382,641 ▲20.16%
- 2011–2012: 369,430 ▼3.45%
- 2012–2013: Not measured
- 2013–2014: 293,580 ▼20.53%
- 2014–2015: 309,138 ▲5.29%
- 2015–2016: 365,848 ▲18.34%
- 2016–2017: 367,137 ▲0.35%
- 2017–2018: 409,816 ▲11.62%
- 2018–2019: 396,950 ▼3.14%
- 2019–2020: 313,250 ▼21.1%
- 2020–2021: 178,750 ▼42.9%
- 2021–2022: 174,750 ▼2.23%
- 2022–2023: 279,100 ▲59.71%

Services
Preceding station	Metro Trains	Following station
Ruthven towards Flinders Street	Mernda line	Thomastown towards Mernda
Track layout
Location

Keon Park station is a railway station operated by Metro Trains Melbourne on the Mernda line, which is part of the Melbourne rail network. It serves the northern suburb of Reservoir, in Melbourne, Victoria, Australia. Keon Park station is an elevated premium station, featuring an island platform with two faces. It opened on 16 December 1929, with the current station provided in June 2024.

Initially opened as Keonpark, the station was given its current name of Keon Park on 29 February 1972.

== History ==
Keon Park station opened on 16 December 1929. It was named after Keon Park Pty Ltd., a land development company formed in 1924. Among the directors was Henry Isaac Cohen, a Barrister, M.L.C. and later a King's Counsel, Minister of Education and Minister for Water Supply, who married Ethel Mary Keon in 1901 and whose children adopted the surname of "Keon-Cohen".

The station opened at the same time as the extension of suburban services and electrification from Reservoir to Thomastown. In November 1959, the line from Reservoir was duplicated, in conjunction with the extension of suburban services to Lalor. However, the duplicated line converged at the up end of the former Keon Parade level crossing, and it was not until 1988 that the current Platform 2 was provided. The crossover, located at the upper end of the station and just past the level crossing, was also provided around this time. It remained the northern extremity for the double line until November 2011, when the line from Keon Park to Epping was duplicated.

In 1963, flashing light signals were provided at the former Keon Parade level crossing, with boom barriers provided later on in 1971. On 15 April 1972, a small fire damaged the interior of the station building. On 1 September 1973, the station was again damaged by fire, as well as damage occurring to the signal box. It was also around this time that the former City of Preston and former local member for the now abolished District of Reservoir, Jim Simmonds, asked the Victorian Railways for opinions on relocating the station to the up side of the level crossing, to allow better access from nearby residential areas.

In 1983, the former ground-level station building was provided, replacing an older timber structure. In 1986, a number of sidings that were located at the down end of the station were abolished.

On 29 July 2021, the Level Crossing Removal Project announced that the level crossing will be grade separated by 2025, with the railway line to be built over the road, and will include a rebuilt station. On 28 March 2022, the LXRP announced that the station would be rebuilt to the south of the current level crossing. In December 2022, final designs were released, with construction on the project beginning in early 2023.

On 12 January 2024, Keon Park Station was closed and demolished. The first elevated train bridge opened on 21 January 2024. The Flinders Street-bound way used the bridge as the Mernda-bound used the level crossing until April 2024, as a solution to keep trains running on the Mernda line.

On 30 April 2024, the Keon Parade level crossing and equipment were eliminated. The elevated train bridge for Mernda-bound way opened on 8 May 2024, and the rebuilt station opened to passengers on 21 June 2024.

== Platforms and services ==
Keon Park has one island platform with two faces. It is serviced by Metro Trains' Mernda line services.

Keon Park platform arrangement
Platform	Line	Destination	Service Type	Source
1	Mernda line	Flinders Street	All stations and limited express services	
2	Mernda line	Mernda	All stations	

== Transport links ==
Kinetic Melbourne operates Two bus routes via Keon Park station, under contract to Transport Victoria:

- 555 : Pacific Epping – Northland Shopping Centre
- SmartBus 902 : Chelsea station – Westfield Airport West
