= Mernda line =

Passenger rail service in metropolitan Melbourne, Victoria, Australia

Mernda

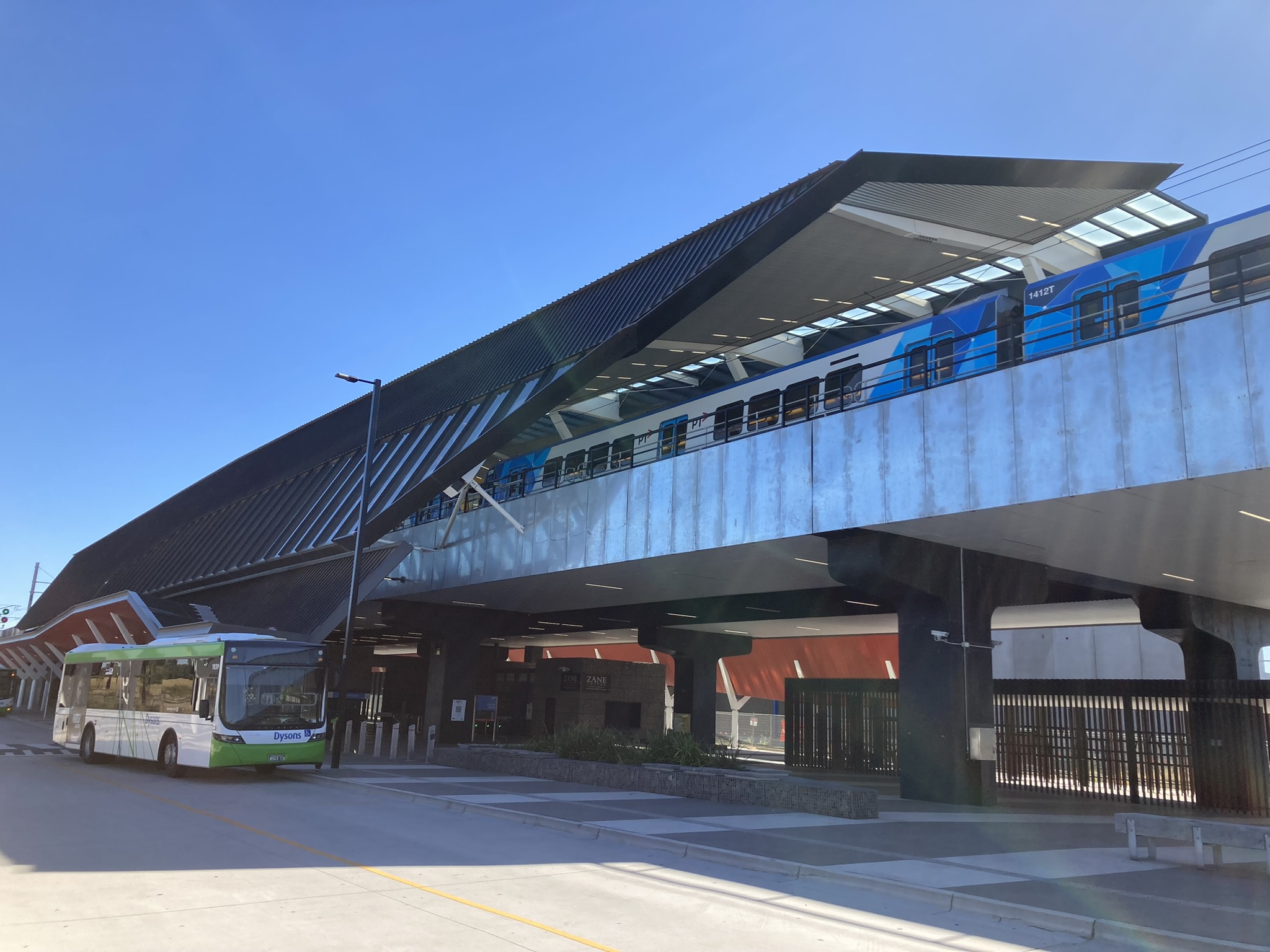
- Mernda station, the terminus of the Mernda line, December 2021

Overview
- Service type: Commuter rail
- System: Melbourne railway network
- Status: Operational
- Locale: Melbourne, Victoria, Australia
- Predecessor: Reservoir (1888–1889); Whittlesea (1889–1959); Reservoir ^ (1921–1929); Thomastown ^ (1929–1959); Lalor ^ (1959–1964); Epping ^ (1964–2012); South Morang ^ (2012–2018)^ were electric services
- First service: 8 October 1888; 138 years ago
- Current operator: Metro Trains
- Former operators: Victorian Railways (VR) (1888–1974); VR as VicRail (1974–1983); MTA (The Met) (1983–1989); PTC (The Met) (1989–1998); Hillside Trains (1998–2000); Connex Melbourne (2000–2009)

Route
- Termini: Flinders Street; Mernda
- Stops: 29 (including City Loop stations)
- Distance travelled: 33.1 km (20.6 mi)
- Average journey time: 1 hour 2 minutes (via City Loop)
- Service frequency: 3–20 minutes weekdays peak; 20 minutes weekdays off-peak; 20 minutes weekend daytime; 30 minutes nights; 60 minutes early weekend mornings; Double frequency between Flinders Street and Clifton Hill in combination with Hurstbridge line; Some services run from Flinders Street to either Reservoir, Epping or South Morang
- Line used: Whittlesea

Technical
- Rolling stock: X'Trapolis 100
- Track gauge: 1,600 mm (5 ft 3 in)
- Electrification: 1500 volt DC overhead
- Track owner: VicTrack

The Mernda line is a commuter railway line on the Melbourne metropolitan railway network serving the city of Melbourne in Victoria, Australia. Operated by Metro Trains Melbourne, the line is coloured red and is one of the two lines that constitute the Clifton Hill group. It is the city's eighth longest metropolitan railway line at 33.1 kilometres (20.6 mi). The line runs from Flinders Street station in central Melbourne to Mernda station in the north, serving 29 stations via Clifton Hill, Reservoir, Epping, and South Morang.

The line operates for approximately 19 hours a day (from approximately 5:00 am to around 12:00 am) with 24-hour service available on Friday and Saturday nights. During peak hour, headways of up to 7.5 minutes are operated with services every 10–30 minutes during off-peak hours. Mernda weekend services were increased in August 2026, with eight new weekend services reducing Sunday morning wait times from 40 to 20 minutes. Trains on the Mernda line run with two three-car formations of X'Trapolis 100 trainsets.

Services on the line began in 1889 when the section between North Fitzroy (on the now-closed Inner Circle line) and Reservoir was opened, which was extended to Whittlesea in the same year. The line was closed beyond Lalor in November 1959, while the remainder of the line was electrified. The closed section has since been gradually reconstructed and reopened; to Epping in 1964, South Morang in April 2012, and to Mernda in August 2018.

Since the 2010s, due to the heavily utilised infrastructure of the Mernda line, significant improvements and upgrades have been made. Two major upgrades of the corridor have taken place, with the line from Epping extended to South Morang in April 2012, duplicated between Keon Park and Epping, and extended again to Mernda in August 2018. Other works have included replacing sleepers, upgrading signalling technology, the introduction of new rolling stock, the removal of level crossings, and station accessibility upgrades.

== History ==
=== 19th century ===
The early beginning of the Mernda line opened on 8 October 1889, as part of railway extensions into the northern suburbs. What became known as the Inner Circle line was opened from Spencer Street station (now Southern Cross station) via Royal Park station, to a station called Collingwood (now called Victoria Park), and then on to Heidelberg. The Epping line branched off at Fitzroy North to Preston-Reservoir station (later renamed Reservoir) in 1889, with the line extended to Whittlesea a few months later, on 23 December.

=== 20th century ===
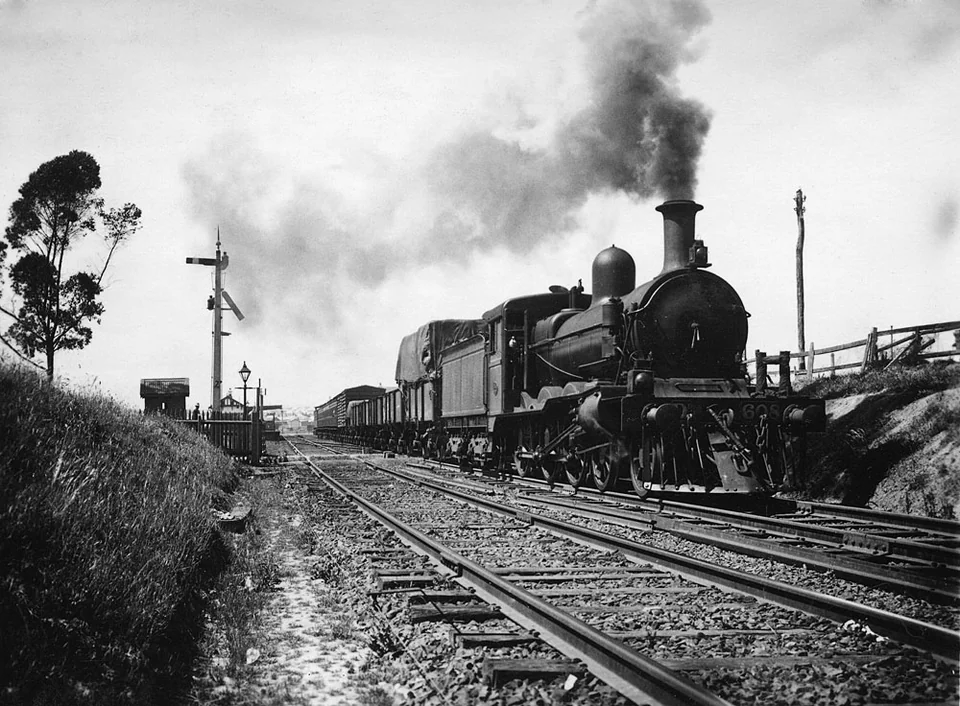
A steam train departing Northcote station on an up service to Whittlesea, 1912.

Trains on the line operated via Fitzroy and the Inner Circle, until the opening of the current connection between Victoria Park and Princes Bridge stations in 1901. Passenger services were operated in two tiers: a local train to Preston-Reservoir station via Clifton Hill, and a country-bound mixed train to Whittlesea, via Fitzroy. The Epping line was electrified to Reservoir in 1921, with an AEC railmotor providing a shuttle service between Reservoir and the terminus at Whittlesea. Preston-Reservoir station was renamed Reservoir in 1909.

The line had a number of Rail Motor Stopping Places along the line, these being a mere nameboard beside the railway line at a public access point. The first were RMSP 8, 9, and 10, which opened on 10 May 1927; followed by Epping Quarries Siding RMSP in January 1928; RMSP 17 in March 1928; RMSP 26 in January 1930; RMSP 33 in July 1932; RMSP 39 in July 1941; and RMSP 77 in October 1949, which was renamed Lalor station in 1952. Direct trains to Whittlesea from Flinders and Spencer streets were withdrawn from 1948.

Electrification was extended along 4.4 kilometres (2.7 mi) of single track to Thomastown in 1929, paid for by a land developer, who paid for the works, as well as guaranteeing against operating losses. Keon Park station was opened at the same time, but the Whittlesea shuttle train continued to connect with suburban trains at Reservoir, until 1931. Goods trains to Whittlesea were withdrawn in 1955, and goods trains from Epping ended in 1958.

Electric suburban services were extended to Lalor station in November 1959, in addition to the duplication of the line from Reservoir to Keon Park, services beyond this point (to Whittlesea) were replaced by a bus service, subsequently closing the remaining section of the line. The line to Epping itself was reopened and electrified in 1964, with the remaining line dismantled in the 1970s. However, the right-of-way beyond Epping was retained to allow future expansion of the rail corridor.

=== 21st century ===
==== South Morang extension ====
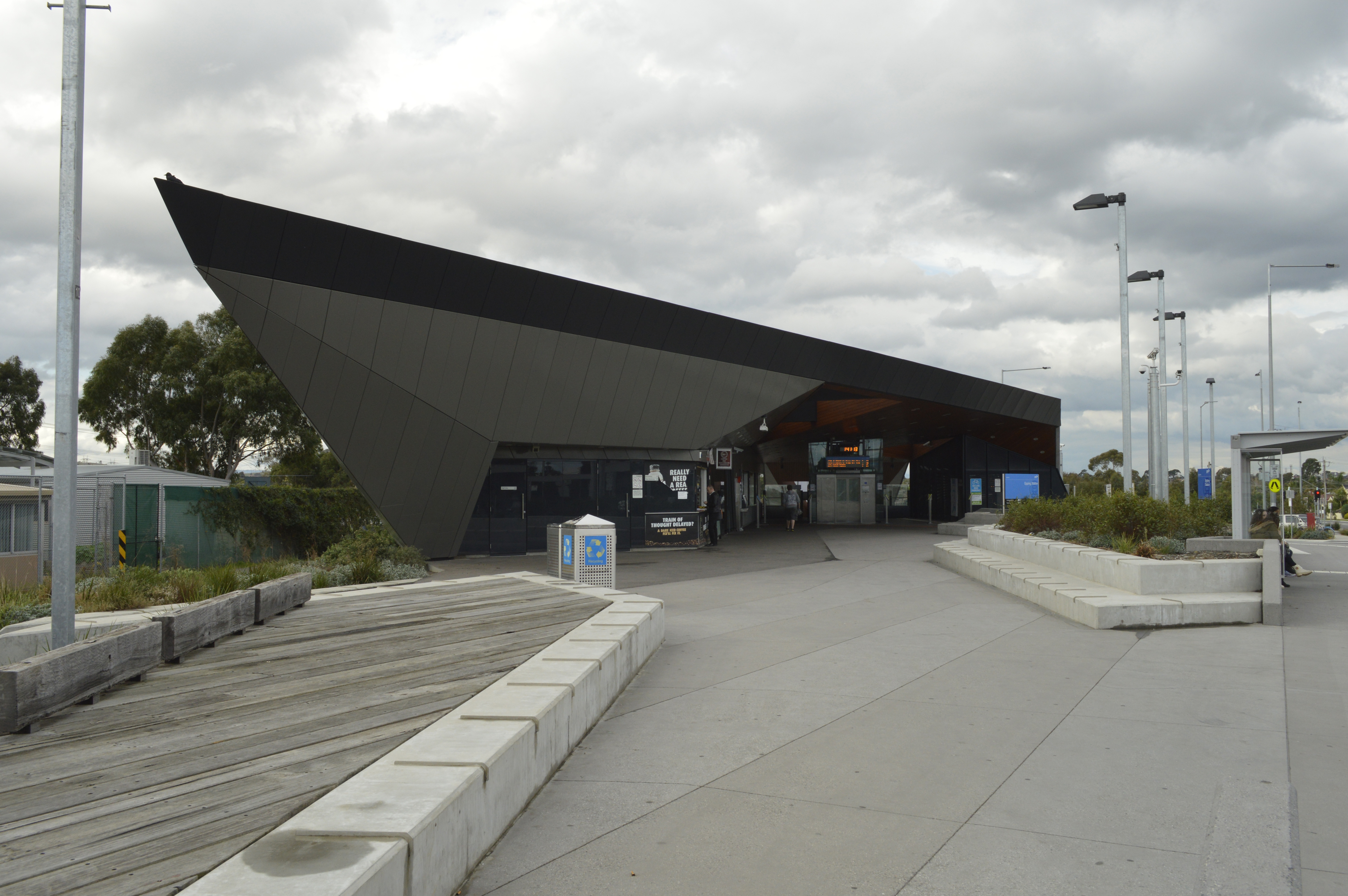
Epping station was rebuilt as part of the project.

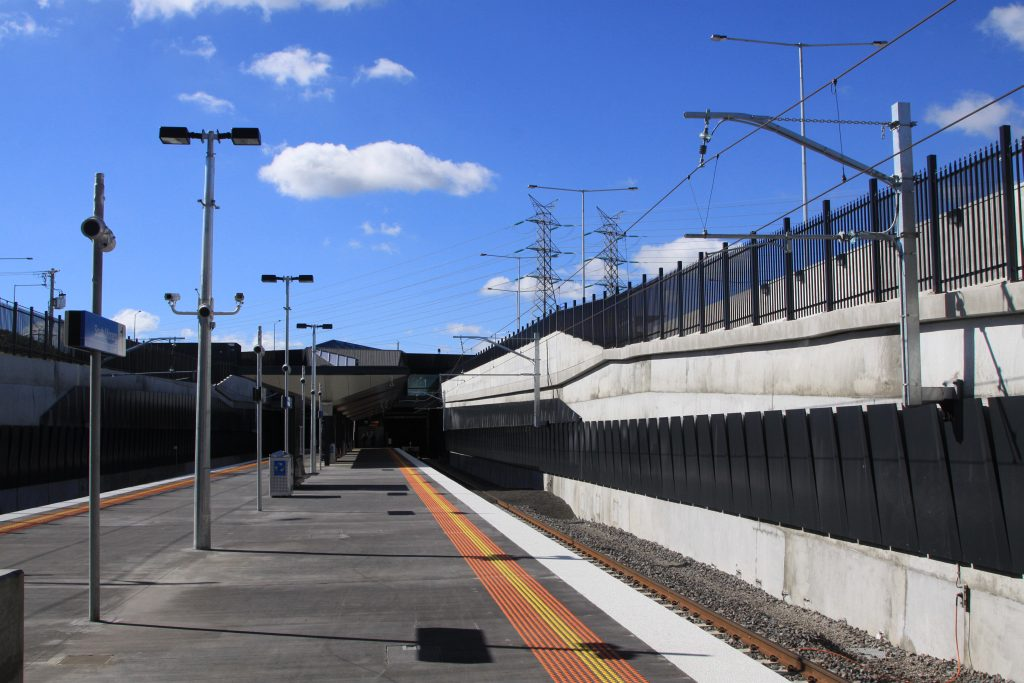
South Morang station opened on 2 April 2012.

Proposals for the duplication of the line between Keon Park and Epping have dated as far back as 1974. In 1983, Whittlesea Council made a submission to the Victorian Government supporting the duplication of the line. Following the election of the Bracks Government in 1999, a promise was made to restore the service to South Morang, along the former right-of-way by 2003. In 2003, a Trainlink bus service was introduced from Epping to South Morang, meeting every train, but the 2005 Meeting Our Transport Challenges plan postponed construction of the railway until 2021. The restoration of the railway to Mernda was also identified in the Strategic Transportation Study, undertaken by the City of Whittlesea in 2002. In the 2008 State Budget, $10 million was earmarked for planning work on the four-kilometre extension, in addition, to design work for the duplication between Keon Park and Epping stations.

On 1 May 2009, the State Government announced that they had committed $562.3 million in the 2009 State Budget for the extension of the line to South Morang, covering capital and construction works. Construction would begin the following year in 2010 and was to be completed by 2013. Major construction commenced in October 2010, with works including:

- The duplication of the 5 km (3.1 mi) of existing single track between Keon Park and Epping
- The construction of 3.5 kilometres (2.2 mi) of new double track from Epping to South Morang
- A rebuilt South Morang station with a bus interchange, 450 car parking spaces, and 29 protected bike spaces
- A rebuilt Thomastown station with a second platform and a pedestrian overpass
- Newly built Epping station
- The upgrade and expansion of the Epping train maintenance facility
- The construction of a new shared use path between Epping and South Morang

The double track between Keon Park and Epping was commissioned on 28 November 2011. A shared use path was opened to the public on 5 February 2012. The three-metre wide path runs the length of the rail extension and provides connections between the existing bicycle network, through to South Morang station. Finally, the extension to South Morang opened on 2 April 2012. No level crossings were built on the new section of the track, with road overpasses provided at Cooper Street, Pindari Avenue, and Civic Drive.

==== Mernda extension ====
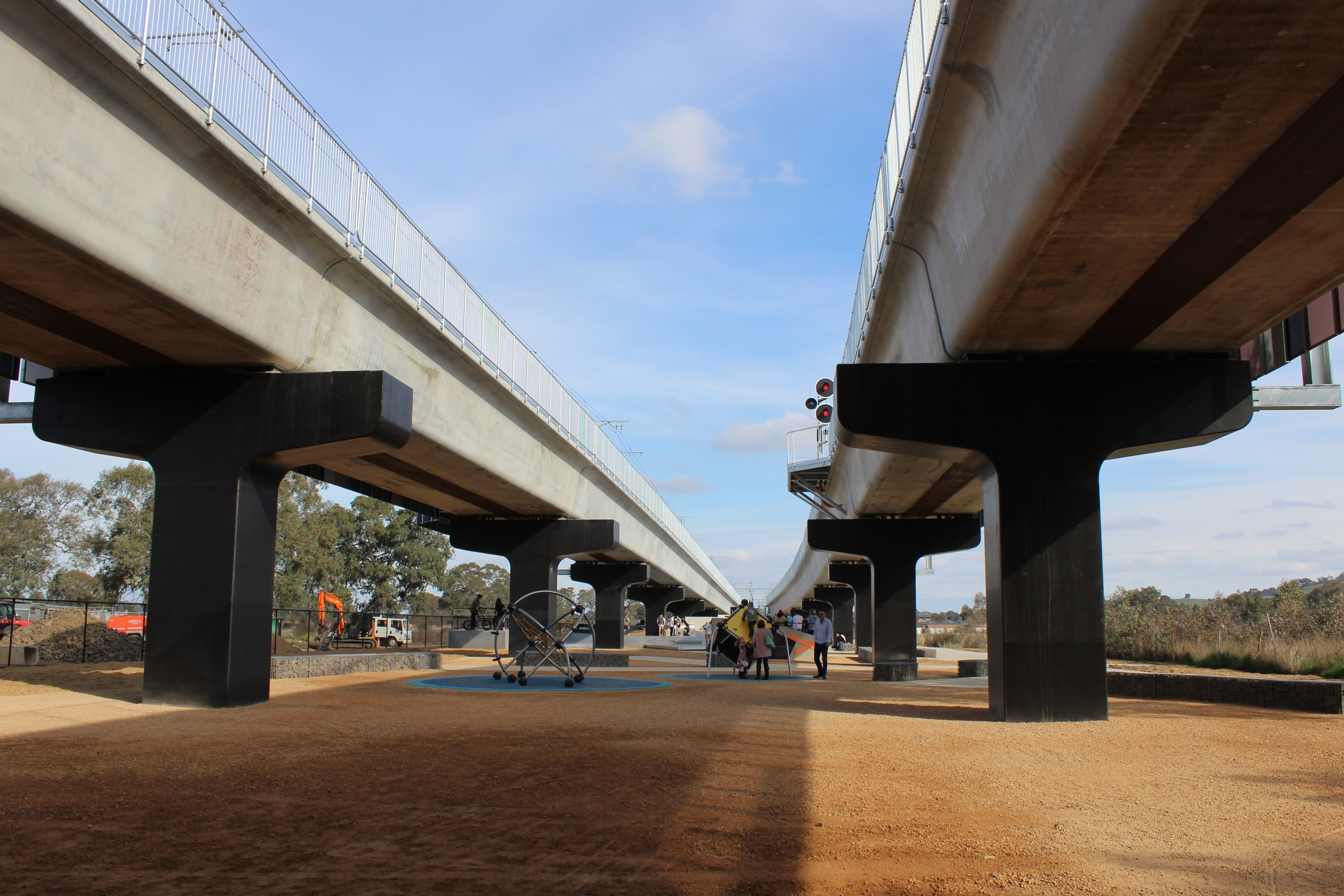
The space underneath the rail corridor on the Mernda extension features public open space like playground equipment.

Proposals for an extension to Mernda have dated as far back as 1974. In 1983, Whittlesea Council made a submission to the Victorian Government to extend the Epping line to South Morang and Mernda. After many years of extensive community activism, the Andrews government announced in the 2015 State Budget that $9 million was to be allocated to plan the 8-kilometre (5 mi) extension of the line to Mernda, with construction commencing in 2016. The announcement included:

- The 8-kilometre (5 mi) line to be fully double tracked
- Completely grade separated through a combination of rail bridges and underpasses, with more than 86% of the rail line being built at ground level
- The construction of two new stations (Mernda and Middle Gorge) with an option for an additional one (Hawkstowe) (all three were constructed)
  - All three stations included bike and car parking as well as bus interchanges
- A new shared use path, connecting to the one constructed at South Morang as part of the South Morang rail extension

Construction began in 2016, with the stations opening six months early on 26 August 2018. Prior to the lines official opening, a community open day was held to promote the new stations to the local residents.

== Future ==
=== Level Crossing Removals ===
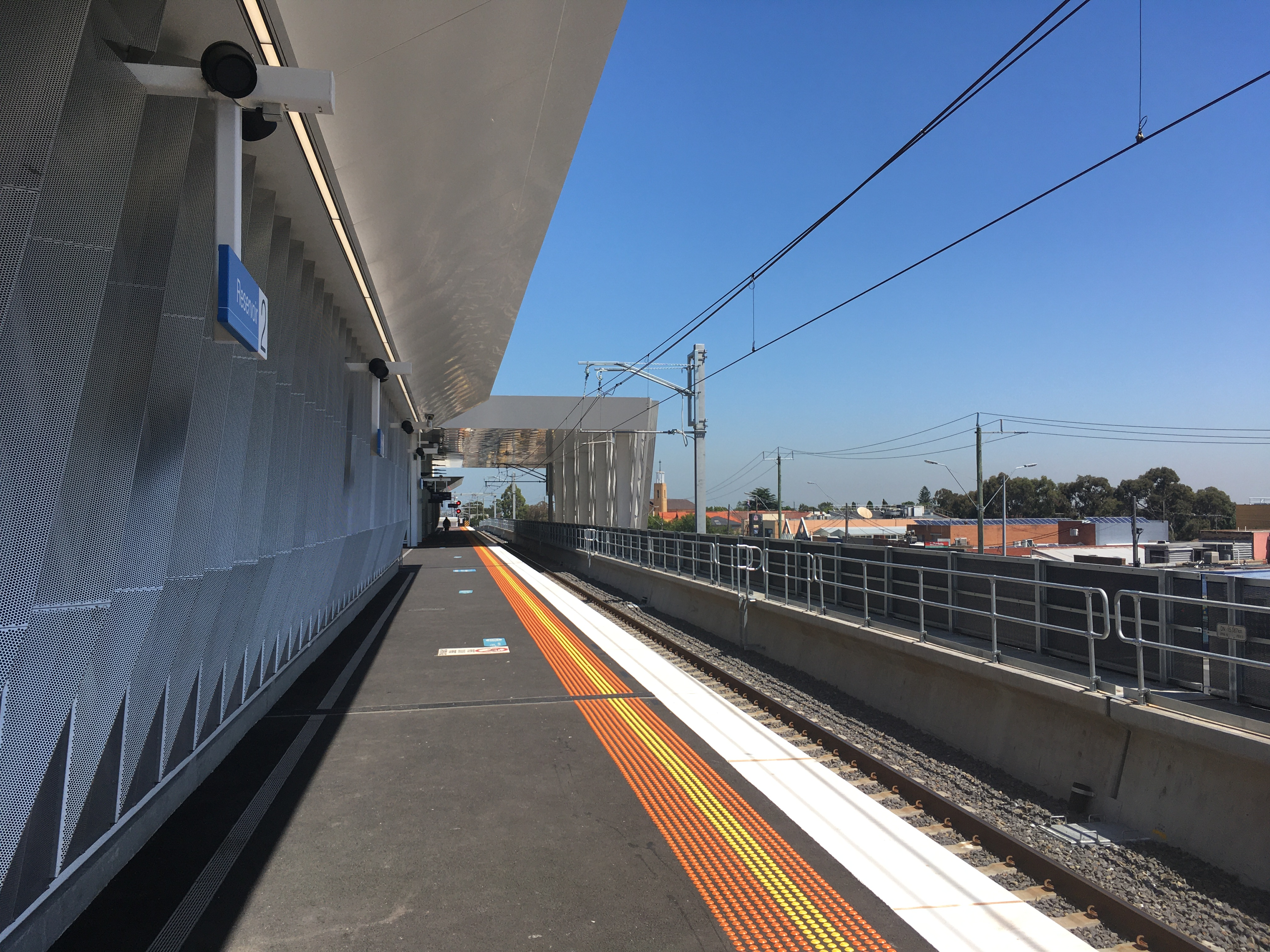
The rebuilt platforms at Reservoir station in February 2020. The station was rebuilt to remove the crossing at High Street, Reservoir.

The Level Crossing Removal Project has removed 6 level crossings on the line, completed in stages from 2019 to 2024. In 2019, the level crossing at High Street, Reservoir was removed by building a rail bridge over the road, along with Reservoir station being rebuilt. In 2022, Bell station and Preston station were both rebuilt with an elevated rail bridge connecting them to remove four crossings, one each at Bell Street, Cramer Street, Murray Road, and Oakover Road. The level crossing at Keon Parade was removed in 2024 by constructing a rail bridge over the road and rebuilding Keon Park station. The Mernda line has 12 remaining level crossings that are not yet proposed for removal.

=== Melbourne Metro 2 ===
The indicative alignment of the Melbourne Metro 2.

The 2012 Network Development Plan identified the need for a new tunnel connecting the Mernda line to the Werribee line and possibly also the Geelong line. The tunnel would run from Clifton Hill, potentially include a new stop somewhere in the inner north, before connecting with Parkville, Flagstaff, and Southern Cross stations. Exiting the CBD, the line would continue in a tunnel stopping at a new station in the suburb of Fishermans Bend, before crossing underneath the Yarra River and arriving at Newport station. The line would then exit the tunnel and travel further west to connect with the Werribee and Geelong lines. The Werribee and Williamstown lines would be reconfigured to provide better and simpler service. This project was initially meant to be completed in the 2020s, however, no funding or planning has taken place, with the revised Victorian Rail Plan stating that the project would be completed under Stage 6 of the plan.

=== Wollert extension ===
Highlighted in the 2018 Victorian Rail Plan, a proposal exists for a spur line to be constructed to the suburb of Wollert, at a cost of up to $300 million. The line would branch off the Mernda line after Lalor station, with new stations at the Pacific Epping shopping centre, and in the suburbs of Epping, Aurora and Wollert. In addition to the new stations, the corridor would be fully grade separated from opening, with the line featuring two tracks, and modern, fully wheelchair accessible stations. In 2017, the State Government announced the acquisition of 6 properties valued at $3.8 million for a future rail corridor. The $3.8 million was sourced from a 'statewide developers' contribution fund. Since the 2017 acquisitions, there has been little planning developments, with only a small amount of attention given by the local residents, council, and some political parties.

== Network and operations ==
=== Services ===
Services on the Mernda line operate from approximately 5:00 am to around 12:00 am daily. In general, during peak hours, train frequency is 7–10 minutes in the AM peak on the Mernda line while during non-peak hours the frequency is reduced to 20–30 minutes throughout the entire route. Frequencies are doubled between Flinders Street and Clifton Hill in conjunction with the Hurstbridge line. On Friday nights and weekends, services run 24 hours a day, with 60-minute frequencies available outside of normal operating hours.

Train services on the Mernda line are also subjected to maintenance and renewal works, usually on selected Fridays and Saturdays. Shuttle bus services are provided throughout the duration of work for affected commuters.

==== Stopping patterns ====
Legend — Station status

- ◼ Premium Station – Station staffed from first to last train
- ◻ Host Station – Usually staffed during morning peak, however this can vary for different stations on the network.

Legend — Stopping patterns
Select services do not operate via the City Loop

- ● – All trains stop
- ◐ – Some services do not stop
- ▲ – Only inbound trains stop
- ▼ – Only outbound trains stop (trains operate clockwise through the city loop all day except during weekend night network)
- | – Trains pass and do not stop

*Services to Reservoir, Epping and express services only operate during weekday morning peak.

**Limited express services only operate during morning peak towards Flinders Street and afternoon peak towards Mernda.

Mernda Services
Station	Zone	Local	**Ltd Express	*Express	*Reservoir	*Epping
◼ Flinders Street	1	●	●	▼	●	●
◼ Southern Cross	1	▼	▼	▼	▼	▼
◼ Flagstaff	1	▼	▼	▼	▼	▼
◼ Melbourne Central	1	▼	▼	▼	▼	▼
◼ Parliament	1	▼	▼	▼	▼	▼
◻ Jolimont	1	●	●	▼	●	●
West Richmond	1	●	|	|	|	◐
North Richmond	1	●	|	|	|	◐
Collingwood	1	●	|	|	|	◐
Victoria Park	1	●	●	●	●	●
◼ Clifton Hill	1	●	●	●	●	●
Rushall	1	●	●	|	|	◐
Merri	1	●	●	|	|	◐
Northcote	1	●	●	|	|	◐
Croxton	1	●	●	|	|	◐
Thornbury	1	●	●	|	|	◐
◼ Bell	1	●	●	|	|	◐
◼ Preston	1/2	●	●	●	●	●
◻ Regent	1/2	●	●	|	|	◐
◼ Reservoir	1/2	●	●	●	●	●
Ruthven	2	●	●	|		◐
Keon Park	2	●	●	|		◐
◼ Thomastown	2	●	●	●		●
Lalor	2	●	●	|		◐
◼ Epping	2	●	●	●		●
◼ South Morang	2	●	●	●		
Middle Gorge	2	●	●	|		
◻ Hawkstowe	2	●	●	|		
◼ Mernda	2	●	●	●		

=== Operators ===
The Mernda line has had a total of 6 operators since its opening in 1888. The majority of operations throughout its history have been government-run: from its first service in 1888 until the 1999 privatisation of Melbourne's rail network, four different government operators have run the line. These operators, Victorian Railways, the Metropolitan Transit Authority, the Public Transport Corporation and Hillside Trains have a combined operational length of 111 years. Hillside Trains was privatised in August 1999 and later rebranded Connex Melbourne. Metro Trains Melbourne, the current private operator, then took over the operations in 2009. Both private operators have had a combined operational period of 27 years.

Past and present operators of the Mernda line:
Operator	Assumed operations	Ceased operations	Length of operations
Victorian Railways	1888	1983	95 years
Metropolitan Transit Authority	1983	1989	6 years
Public Transport Corporation	1989	1998	9 years
Hillside Trains (government operator)	1998	1999	1 years
Connex Melbourne	1999	2009	10 years
Metro Trains Melbourne	2009	incumbent	16 years (ongoing)

=== Route ===
Interactive map of the Mernda line in northern Melbourne

The Mernda line forms a relatively linear route from the Melbourne central business district to its terminus in Mernda. The route is 33.1 kilometres (20.6 mi) long and is double track the entire way from Flinders Street to its terminus. The only underground section of the Mernda line is in the City Loop, where the service stops at 3 underground stations. Exiting the city, the Mernda line traverses mainly flat country with few curves and fairly minimal earthworks for most of the line. Despite the otherwise fairly straight line, it does include Melbourne's sharpest railway curve, between Rushall and Merri. This curve originally made up the third side of a triangular junction, connecting the two original branches from the now-closed North Fitzroy station. Only this third leg of the triangle remains. Some sections of the line has been elevated or lowered into a cutting to eliminate level crossings. Despite some removals, there are a number of level crossings still present with no current plans to remove them.

The line follows the same alignment as the Hurstbridge line with the two services splitting onto different routes at Clifton Hill. The Mernda line continues on its northern alignment, whereas the Hurstbridge line takes a north-eastern alignment towards its final destination of Hurstbridge station. Most of the rail line goes through built-up suburbs and some industrial areas, but after Middle Gorge, the line gets into more sporadic suburbs and park lands. This outer portion of the line is one of Melbourne's main growth corridors, which is rapidly replacing farmland with housing and commercial developments causing a rise in patronage.

=== Stations ===
The line serves 29 stations across 33.1 kilometres (20.6 mi) of track. The stations are a mix of elevated, lowered, underground, and ground-level designs. Underground stations are present only in the City Loop, with the majority of elevated and lowered stations being constructed as part of level crossing removals or line extension projects. From 2025, Keon Park station will be elevated as part of level crossing removal works.

Station	Accessibility	Opened	Terrain	Train connections	Other connections
Flinders Street	Yes—step free access	1854	Lowered	13 connections: * Alamein line; Belgrave line; Craigieburn line; Flemington Racecourse line; Frankston line; Gippsland line; Glen Waverley line; Hurstbridge line; Lilydale line; Sandringham line; Upfield line; Werribee line; Williamstown line	Trams Buses
Southern Cross	Yes—step free access	1859	Ground level	25 connections: * Alamein line; Albury line; Ararat line; Ballarat line; Belgrave line; Bendigo line; Craigieburn line; Echuca line; Flemington Racecourse line; Frankston line; Geelong line; Gippsland line; Glen Waverley line; Hurstbridge line; Lilydale line; Maryborough line; NSW TrainLink Southern; Seymour line; Shepparton line; Swan Hill line; The Overland; Upfield line; Warrnambool line; Werribee line; Williamstown line	Trams Buses Coaches SkyBus
Flagstaff	Yes—step free access	1985	Underground	8 connections: * Alamein line; Belgrave line; Craigieburn line; Frankston line; Glen Waverley line; Hurstbridge line; Lilydale line; Upfield line	Trams
Melbourne Central	Yes—step free access	1981	Underground	8 connections: * Alamein line; Belgrave line; Craigieburn line; Frankston line; Glen Waverley line; Hurstbridge line; Lilydale line; Upfield line	Trams Buses
Parliament	Yes—step free access	1983	Underground	8 connections: * Alamein line; Belgrave line; Craigieburn line; Frankston line; Glen Waverley line; Hurstbridge line; Lilydale line; Upfield line	Trams
Jolimont	Yes—step free access	1901	Lowered	1 connection: Hurstbridge line	Trams
West Richmond	Yes—step free access	1901	Ground level	1 connection: Hurstbridge line	Buses
North Richmond	No—steep ramp	1901	Elevated	1 connection: Hurstbridge line	Trams Buses
Collingwood	No—steep ramp	1901	Elevated	1 connection: Hurstbridge line	Buses
Victoria Park	No—steep ramp	1888	Elevated	1 connection: Hurstbridge line	Buses
Clifton Hill	No—steep ramp	1888	Ground level	1 connection: Hurstbridge line	Buses
Rushall	No—steep ramp	1927	Ground level		Buses
Merri	Yes—step free access	1889	Ground level		Trams Buses
Northcote	Yes—step free access	1889	Ground level		Trams Buses
Croxton	Yes—step free access	1889	Ground level		Trams
Thornbury	Yes—step free access	1889	Ground level		Trams
Bell	Yes—step free access	1889	Elevated		Buses
Preston	Yes—step free access	1889	Elevated		Buses
Regent	No—steep ramp	1889	Ground level		Buses
Reservoir	Yes—step free access	1889	Elevated		Buses
Ruthven	No—steep ramp	1963	Ground level		Buses
Keon Park	Yes—step free access	1929	Elevated		Buses
Thomastown	Yes—step free access	1889	Ground level		Buses
Lalor	Yes—step free access	1949	Ground level		Buses
Epping	Yes—step free access	1889	Lowered		Buses
South Morang	Yes—step free access	2012	Lowered		Buses
Middle Gorge	Yes—step free access	2018	Ground level		Buses
Hawkstowe	Yes—step free access	2018	Elevated		Buses
Mernda	Yes—step free access	2018	Elevated		Buses

Station histories
Station	Opened	Closed	Age	Notes
Parliament	22 January 1983		43 years	
Melbourne Central	26 January 1981		45 years	Formerly Museum
Flagstaff	27 May 1985		41 years	
Southern Cross	17 January 1859		167 years	Formerly Batman's Hill; Formerly Spencer Street
Flinders Street	12 September 1854		172 years	Formerly Melbourne Terminus
Princes Bridge	8 February 1859	1 October 1866	7 years	
Princes Bridge	2 April 1879	30 June 1980	101 years	
Jolimont	21 October 1901		125 years	
West Richmond	21 October 1901		125 years	
North Richmond	21 October 1901		125 years	
Collingwood	21 October 1901		125 years	Formerly Collingwood Town Hall
Victoria Park	8 May 1888		138 years	Formerly Collingwood
Clifton Hill	8 May 1888		138 years	
Rushall	1 January 1927		99 years	
Merri	8 October 1889		137 years	Formerly Northcote
Northcote	8 October 1889		137 years	Formerly Middle Northcote
Croxton	8 October 1889		137 years	
Thornbury	8 October 1889		137 years	
Bell	8 October 1889		137 years	Formerly Preston – Bell Street
Preston	8 October 1889		137 years	Formerly Preston – Murray Road; Formerly Murray
Regent	8 October 1889		137 years	Formerly Preston – Regent Street
Reservoir	8 October 1889		137 years	Formerly Preston – Reservoir
Ruthven	5 August 1963		63 years	
Keon Park	16 December 1929		96 years	Formerly Keonpark
Thomastown	23 December 1889		136 years	
Railmotor Stopping Place No.8 (2nd)	c. 13 March 1928	29 November 1959	Approx. 31 years	Approx. near Mann's Crossing
Lalor	29 September 1947	28 November 1959	12 years	Formerly Railmotor Stopping Place No.77
Lalor	30 November 1959		66 years	
Railmotor Stopping Place No.8 (1st)	c. 10 May 1927	c. 13 March 1928	Approx. 10 months	Approx. near Childs Road
Epping	23 December 1889	28 November 1959	69 years	1st site
Epping	30 November 1964	24 November 2011	46 years	2nd site
Epping	28 November 2011		14 years	3rd site
Railmotor Stopping Place No.34	12 May 1925	29 November 1959	34 years	Formerly Epping Quarries Siding
South Morang	22 April 2012		14 years	
Railmotor Stopping Place No.39	c. 1 July 1941	29 November 1959	Approx. 18 years	Approx. near McDonald's Road
Middle Gorge	23 December 1889	28 November 1959	69 years	Was originally South Morang
Middle Gorge	26 August 2018		8 years	Known as Marymede during construction; Reopened as Middle Gorge
Railmotor Stopping Place No.33	25 July 1932	29 November 1959	27 years	Approx. near Plenty Road
Hawkstowe	26 August 2018		8 years	
Railmotor Stopping Place No.9	c. 10 May 1927	29 November 1959	Approx. 32 years	Approx. near Hawkstowe Parade
Mernda	23 December 1889	28 November 1959	69 years	Formerly South Yan Yean
Mernda	28 June 2018		8 years	

== Infrastructure ==
=== Rolling stock ===
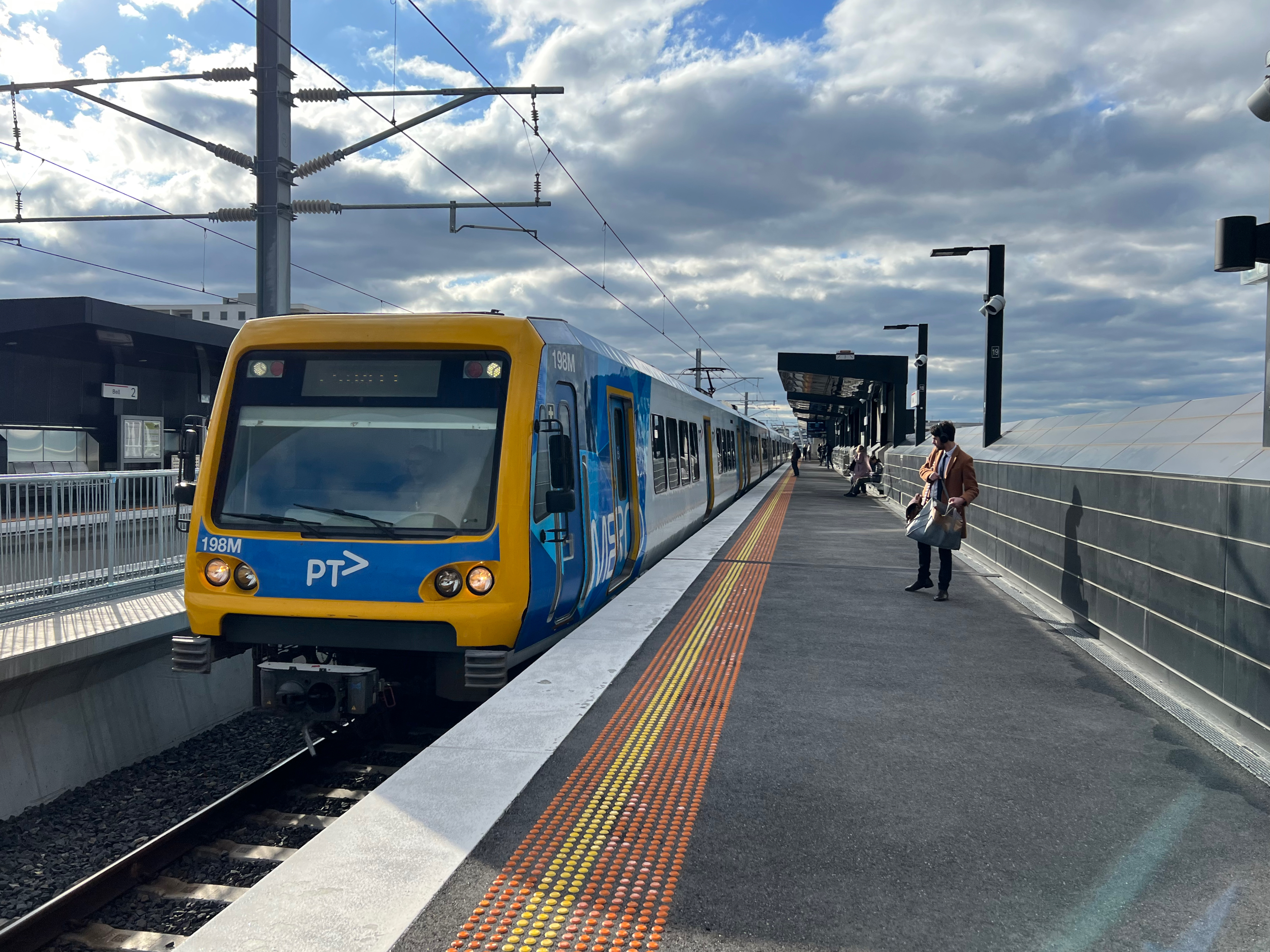
A X'Trapolis train departing Bell station in July 2023.

The Mernda line uses electric multiple unit (EMU) X'Trapolis 100 trains operating in a two three-car configuration, with three doors per side on each carriage, and can accommodate up to 432 seated passengers in each six-car configuration. The trains were originally built between 2002 and 2004 as well as between 2009 and 2020 with a total of 212 three-car sets constructed. The trains are shared with 7 other metropolitan train lines and have been in service since 2003.

Alongside the passenger trains, Mernda line tracks and equipment are maintained by a fleet of engineering trains. The four types of engineering trains are: the shunting train; designed for moving trains along non-electrified corridors and for transporting other maintenance locomotives, for track evaluation; designed for evaluating track and its condition, the overhead inspection train; designed for overhead wiring inspection, and the infrastructure evaluation carriage designed for general infrastructure evaluation. Most of these trains are repurposed locomotives previously used by V/Line, Metro Trains, and the Southern Shorthaul Railroad.

=== Accessibility ===
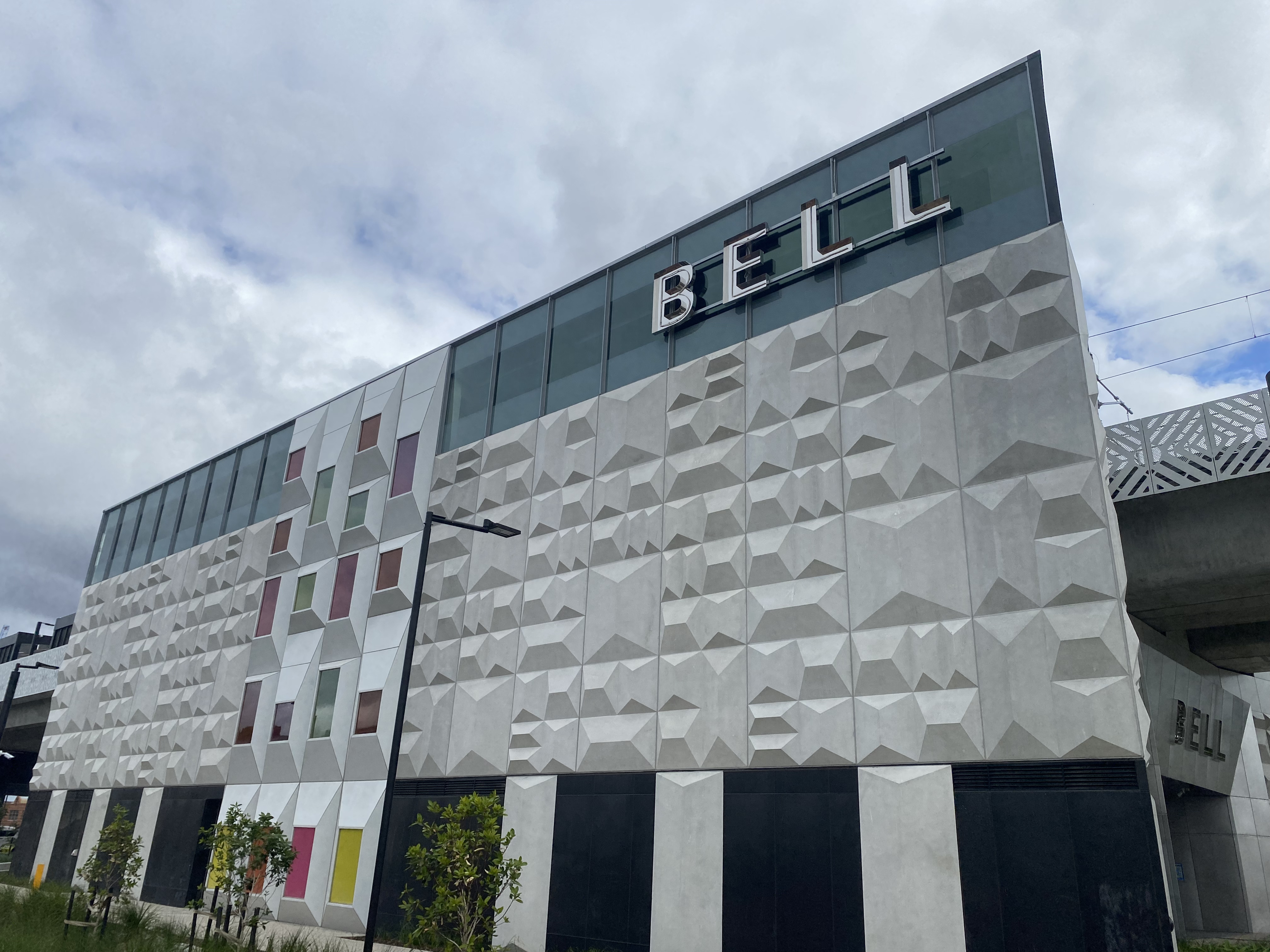
The recently rebuilt Bell station has assisted in making the line more wheelchair accessible

In compliance with the Disability Discrimination Act of 1992, all stations that are new-built or rebuilt are fully accessible and comply with these guidelines. Just over half of the stations on the corridor are fully accessible, however, some stations haven't been upgraded to meet these guidelines. These stations do feature ramps, however, they have a gradient greater than 1 in 14. Stations that are fully accessible feature ramps that have a gradient less than 1 in 14, have at-grade paths, or feature lifts. These stations typically also feature tactile boarding indicators, independent boarding ramps, wheelchair accessible myki barriers, hearing loops, and widened paths.

Projects improving station accessibility have included the Level Crossing Removal Project, which involves station rebuilds and upgrades, and individual station upgrade projects. These works have made significant strides in improving network accessibility, with more than 67% of Mernda line stations classed as fully accessible. Future station upgrade projects will continue to increase the number of fully accessible stations over time.

=== Signalling ===
The Mernda line uses three-position signalling which is widely used across the Melbourne train network. Three-position signalling was first introduced on the line in 1921, with the final section of the line converted to the new type of signalling during the extension of the line to Mernda in 2018.
