= Merri railway station =

Railway station in Melbourne, Australia

Merri
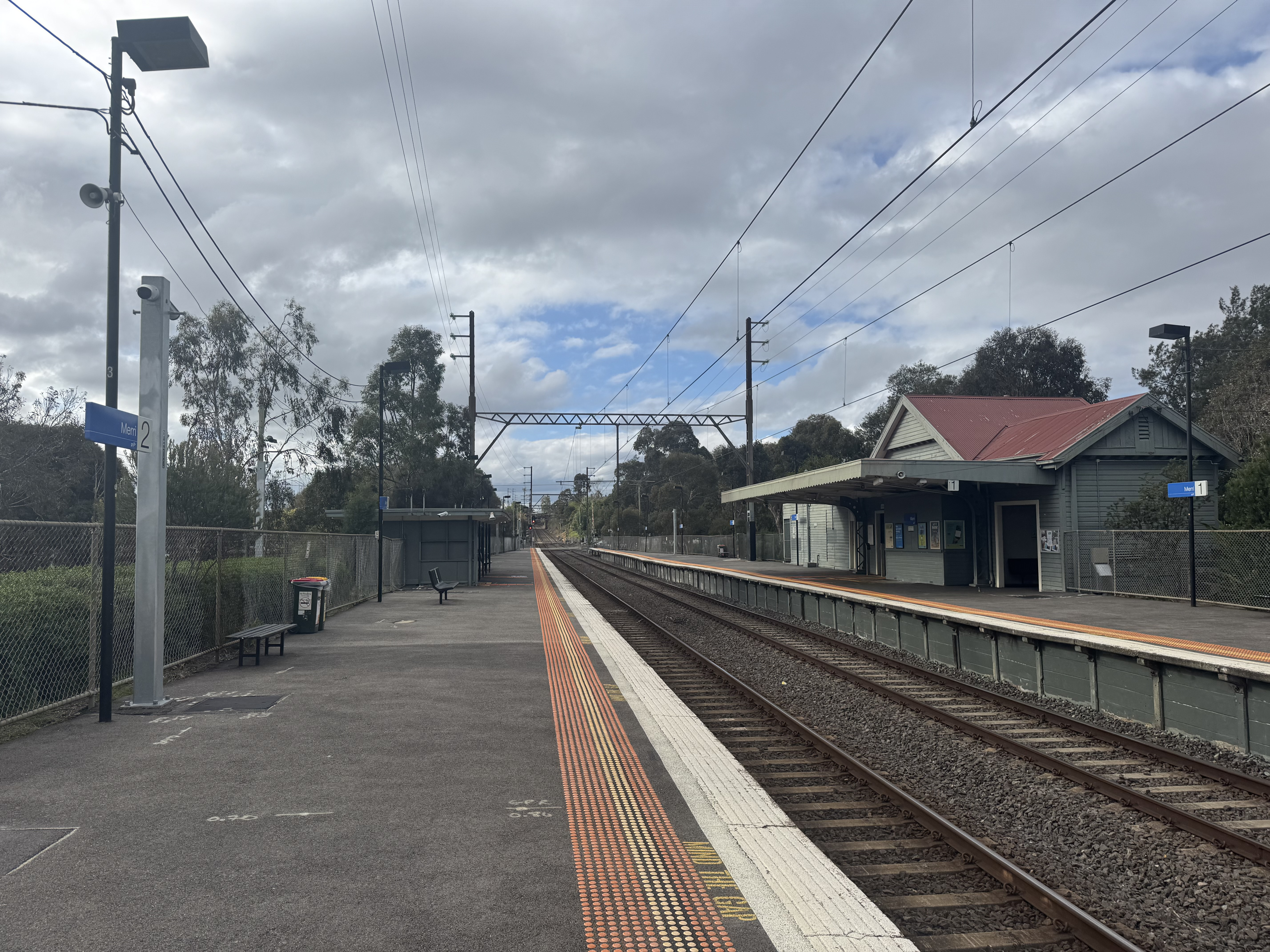
- Northbound view from Platform 2, September 2025

General information
- Location: Railway Street, Northcote, Victoria 3070; City of Darebin; Australia
- Coordinates: 37°46′40″S 144°59′35″E
- System: PTV commuter rail station
- Owner: VicTrack
- Operator: Metro Trains
- Line: Mernda
- Distance: 8.04 kilometres from Southern Cross
- Platforms: 2 side
- Tracks: 2
- Connections: Bus; Tram

Construction
- Structure type: Ground
- Parking: 6
- Accessible: Yes—step free access

Other information
- Status: Operational, unstaffed
- Station code: MER
- Fare zone: Myki zone 1
- Website: Public Transport Victoria

History
- Opened: 8 October 1889; 137 years ago
- Rebuilt: 1910
- Electrified: July 1921 (1500 V DC overhead)
- Former names: Northcote (1889-1906)

Passengers
- 2005–2006: 192,755
- 2006–2007: 202,653 ▲5.13%
- 2007–2008: 211,789 ▲4.5%
- 2008–2009: 220,480 ▲4.1%
- 2009–2010: 242,520 ▲10%
- 2010–2011: 246,079 ▲1.46%
- 2011–2012: 222,770 ▼9.47%
- 2012–2013: Not measured
- 2013–2014: 176,555 ▼20.75%
- 2014–2015: 181,403 ▲2.74%
- 2015–2016: 185,671 ▲2.35%
- 2016–2017: 194,309 ▲4.65%
- 2017–2018: 208,180 ▲7.14%
- 2018–2019: 196,550 ▼5.59%
- 2019–2020: 153,450 ▼21.93%
- 2020–2021: 70,400 ▼54.1%
- 2021–2022: 72,550 ▲3.05%

Services
Preceding station	Metro Trains	Following station
Rushall towards Flinders Street	Mernda line	Northcote towards Mernda
Track layout
Location

Merri station is a railway station operated by Metro Trains Melbourne on the Mernda line, which is part of the Melbourne rail network. It serves the north-eastern suburb of Northcote, in Melbourne, Victoria, Australia. Merri station is a ground level unstaffed station, featuring two side platforms. It opened on 8 October 1889, with the current station provided in 1910.

Initially opened as Northcote, the station was given its current name of Merri on 10 December 1906.

== History ==
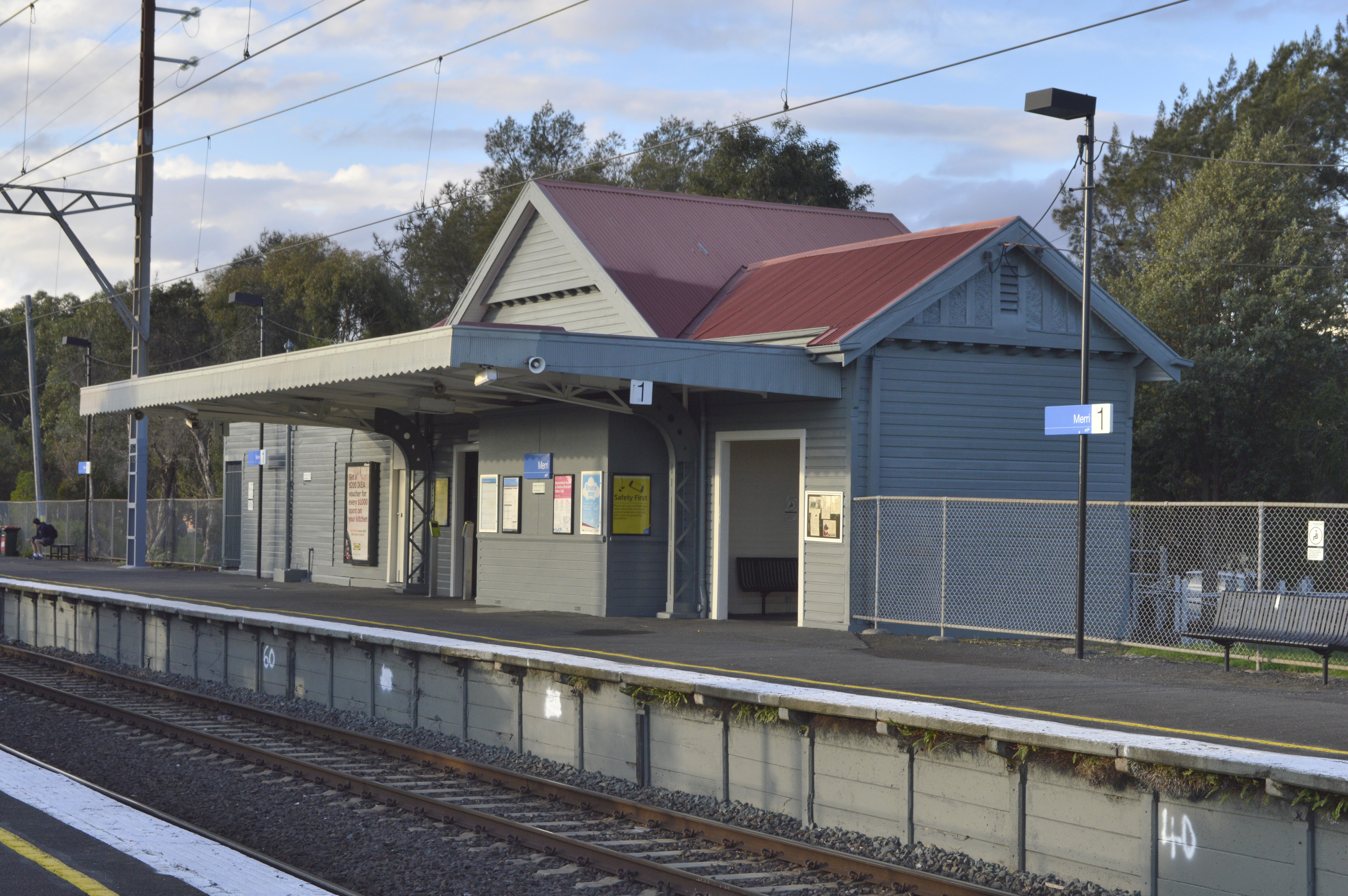
The original 1889 station building on Platform 1, May 2014

Merri station opened on 8 October 1889, when the Inner Circle line was extended from North Fitzroy to Reservoir. The original conception of the station was to act as a major junction in a planned "North Suburban Railway System. The Argus reported in 1887 that; "The Station at Union-street, as shown on our plan, must necessarily be the most important in the Northern System, as lines branch from this point to Preston and Whittlesea on the north; Heidelberg, Kew, &.c., on the east; Carlton, Royal-park, North Melbourne, and Spencer-street on the south-west; Fitzroy, East Melbourne, and Flinders-street on the south; and if the alternative route is adopted, Clifton-hill, Collingwood, Richmond, and Flinders street on the south east.", while land sale plans advertised the upcoming construction of the Grand Central Junction Station".

In 1910, the station building was rebuilt to accommodate an increased population in the area.

The nearby level crossing at Charles Street had hand-operated gates until 1924, when they were replaced with interlocked gates, operated from the nearby signal box, following several serious traffic accidents. In 1986, these gates were replaced with boom barriers. In 1987, the signal box was abolished.

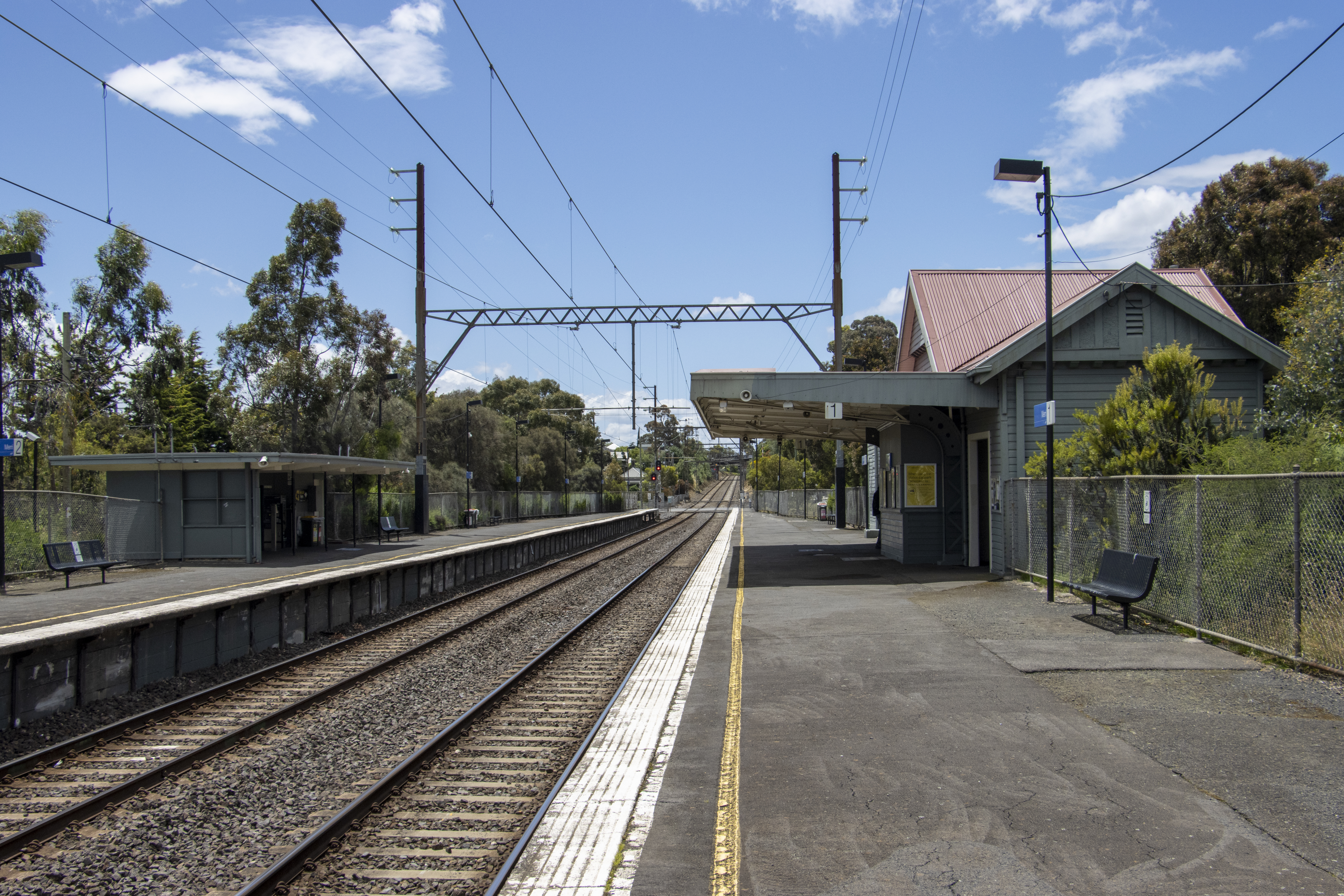
Northbound view from Platform 1, prior to safety and accessibility upgrades done to the station, November 2022

In 1973, both platforms were extended at the down end of the station.

During October 1987, the double line block system between Merri – Northcote was abolished, and replaced with three position signalling, with all two position signals between Merri – Thornbury also abolished.

Merri was part of a $21.9 million package in the 2022/23 Victorian State Budget, alongside other stations, to receive improvements for safety and accessibility. As of 2026, Merri has received new accessible platform shelters on both platforms, new CCTV cameras and real-time passenger information displays.

== Platforms and services ==
Merri has two side platforms. It is served by Mernda line trains.

Merri platform arrangement
Platform	Line	Destination	Service Type	Source
1	Mernda line	Flinders Street	All stations and limited express services	
2	Mernda line	Mernda	All stations	

== Transport links ==
Kinetic Melbourne operates one bus route via Merri station:

- 506 : Moonee Ponds Junction – Westgarth station

Yarra Trams operates two routes via Merri station:

- : West Preston – Victoria Harbour (Docklands)
- : Bundoora RMIT – Waterfront City (Docklands)
