= North Richmond railway station =

Railway station in Melbourne, Australia

North Richmond
- Northbound view from Platform 2, November 2026

General information
- Location: Victoria Street / Regent Street, Richmond, Victoria 3121; City of Yarra; Australia
- Coordinates: 37°48′37″S 144°59′33″E
- System: PTV commuter rail station
- Owner: VicTrack
- Operator: Metro Trains
- Lines: Mernda; Hurstbridge
- Distance: 4.16 kilometres from Southern Cross
- Platforms: 2 side
- Tracks: 2
- Connections: Bus; Tram

Construction
- Structure type: Elevated
- Accessible: No—steep ramp

Other information
- Status: Operational, unstaffed
- Station code: NRM
- Fare zone: Myki zone 1
- Website: Public Transport Victoria

History
- Opened: 21 October 1901; 125 years ago
- Rebuilt: 1981
- Electrified: July 1921 (1500 V DC overhead)

Passengers
- 2005–2006: 335,479
- 2006–2007: 359,366 ▲7.12%
- 2007–2008: 407,006 ▲13.25%
- 2008-2009: 455,104 ▲11.81%
- 2009-2010: 496,658 ▲9.13%
- 2010-2011: 543,825 ▲9.5%
- 2011-2012: 598,804 ▲10.1%
- 2012-2013: Not measured
- 2013-2014: 772,944 ▲29.1%
- 2014-2015: 802,076 ▲3.76%
- 2015-2016: 855,718 ▲6.68%
- 2016-2017: 889,670 ▲3.97%
- 2017-2018: 899,179 ▲1.06%
- 2018-2019: 929,650 ▲3.39%
- 2019-2020: 738,350 ▼20.58%
- 2020-2021: 339,950 ▼54%
- 2021–2022: 351,250 ▲3.32%

Services
Preceding station	Metro Trains	Following station
West Richmond towards Flinders Street	Mernda line	Collingwood towards Mernda
West Richmond towards Flinders Street	Hurstbridge line	Collingwood towards Hurstbridge
Track layout
Location

North Richmond station is a railway station operated by Metro Trains Melbourne on the Mernda and Hurstbridge lines, both part of the Melbourne rail network. It serves the inner-eastern suburb of Richmond, in Melbourne, Victoria, Australia. North Richmond station is a ground-level unstaffed station, featuring two side platforms. It opened on 21 October 1901, with the current station provided in 1981.

== History ==
North Richmond station opened on 21 October 1901, when a direct railway line was provided between Princes Bridge and Collingwood.

In 1913, a crossover was provided at the down end of the station. In 1941, it was abolished.

In 1981, the current station buildings were provided.

== Platforms and services ==
North Richmond is an elevated station with two side platforms, each with a pebbledash station building. It is served by Mernda and Hurstbridge line trains.

North Richmond platform arrangement
Platform	Line	Destination	Service Type	Source
1	Mernda line Hurstbridge line	Flinders Street	All stations	
2	Mernda line Hurstbridge line	Reservoir, Epping, Mernda, Macleod, Greensborough, Eltham or Hurstbridge	All stations and limited express services	

== Transport links ==
Kinetic Melbourne operates twelve routes via North Richmond station, under contract to Public Transport Victoria:

- 246 : Elsternwick station – Clifton Hill
- 302 : Melbourne CBD (Lonsdale Street) – Box Hill station
- 303 : Melbourne CBD (Queen Street) – Ringwood North
- 304 : Melbourne CBD (Lonsdale Street) – Westfield Doncaster
- 305 : Melbourne CBD (Lonsdale Street) – The Pines Shopping Centre (peak-hour only)
- 309 : Melbourne CBD (Queen Street) – Donvale
- 318 : Melbourne CBD (Lonsdale Street) – Deep Creek Reserve (Doncaster East)
- 350 : Melbourne CBD (Queen Street) – La Trobe University Bundoora campus
- SmartBus 905 : Melbourne CBD (Lonsdale Street) – The Pines Shopping Centre
- SmartBus 906 : Melbourne CBD (Lonsdale Street) – Warrandyte
- SmartBus 907 : Melbourne CBD (Lonsdale Street) – Mitcham station
- SmartBus 908 : Melbourne CBD (Lonsdale Street) – The Pines Shopping Centre (peak-hour only)

Yarra Trams operates two tram routes via North Richmond station:

- : Victoria Gardens – St Kilda
- : Box Hill – Port Melbourne
