= Croxton railway station =

Railway station in Melbourne, Australia

Croxton
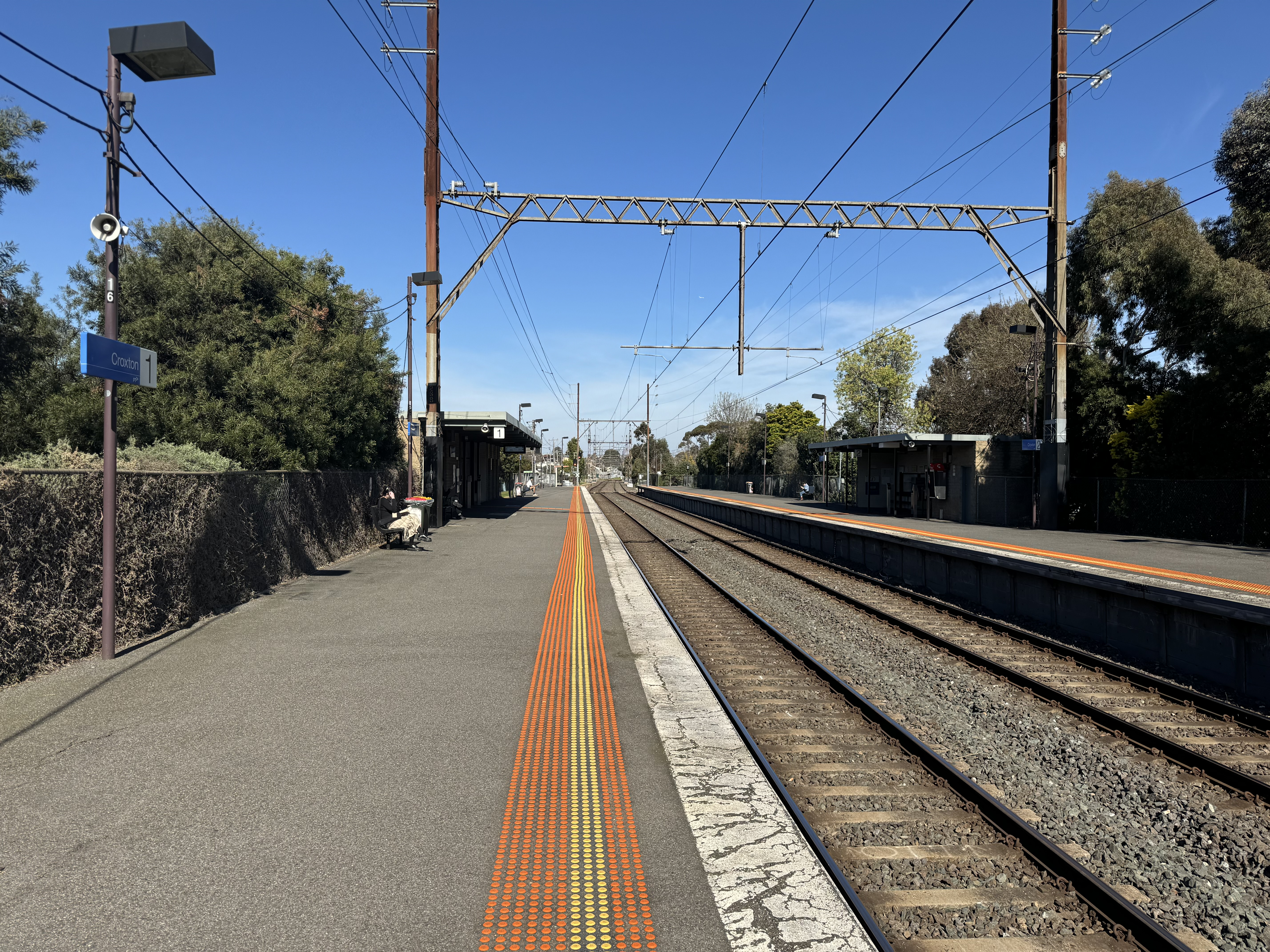
- Southbound view from Platform 2, August 2024

General information
- Location: Stott Street, Northcote, Victoria 3070; City of Darebin; Australia
- Coordinates: 37°45′51″S 144°59′48″E
- System: PTV commuter rail station
- Owner: VicTrack
- Operator: Metro Trains
- Line: Mernda
- Distance: 9.61 kilometres from Southern Cross
- Platforms: 2 side
- Tracks: 2
- Connections: Tram

Construction
- Structure type: Ground
- Accessible: Yes—step free access

Other information
- Status: Operational, unstaffed
- Station code: CXT
- Fare zone: Myki zone 1
- Website: Public Transport Victoria

History
- Opened: 8 October 1889; 136 years ago
- Rebuilt: 1973/1974 FY
- Electrified: July 1921 (1500 V DC overhead)

Passengers
- 2005–2006: 229,739
- 2006–2007: 247,968 ▲7.93%
- 2007–2008: 258,067 ▲4.07%
- 2008–2009: 282,271 ▲9.37%
- 2009–2010: 311,705 ▲10.43%
- 2010–2011: 310,263 ▼0.46%
- 2011–2012: 290,919 ▼6.23%
- 2012–2013: Not measured
- 2013–2014: 307,410 ▲5.67%
- 2014–2015: 311,231 ▲1.24%
- 2015–2016: 317,236 ▲1.92%
- 2016–2017: 337,496 ▲6.39%
- 2017–2018: 362,581 ▲7.43%
- 2018–2019: 356,400 ▼1.7%
- 2019–2020: 281,250 ▼21.1%
- 2020–2021: 115,250 ▼59.02%
- 2021–2022: 121,300 ▲5.24%
- 2022–2023: 202,800 ▲67.19%
- 2023–2024: 228,050 ▲12.45%
- 2024–2025: 244,250 ▲7.1%

Services
Preceding station	Metro Trains	Following station
Northcote towards Flinders Street	Mernda line	Thornbury towards Mernda
Track layout
Location

Croxton station is a railway station operated by Metro Trains Melbourne on the Mernda line, part of the Melbourne rail network. It serves the north-eastern Melbourne suburb of Northcote in Victoria, Australia. Croxton is a ground-level unstaffed station, featuring two side platforms. It opened on 8 October 1889, with the current station provided in the 1973/74 fiscal year.

== History ==
Croxton station opened on 8 October 1889, when the Inner Circle line was extended from North Fitzroy to Reservoir, Croxton station was named after the nearby Croxton Park Racecourse and Hotel, which in turn was named after Croxton Racecourse in Leicestershire, England.

In 1922, the station was closed to goods traffic.

On 3 July 1972, the former station building on Platform 1 was damaged by fire, with the waiting room and toilets destroyed. During the 1973/1974 financial year, the present station buildings were provided. Platform extensions also occurred during this time.

== Platforms and services ==
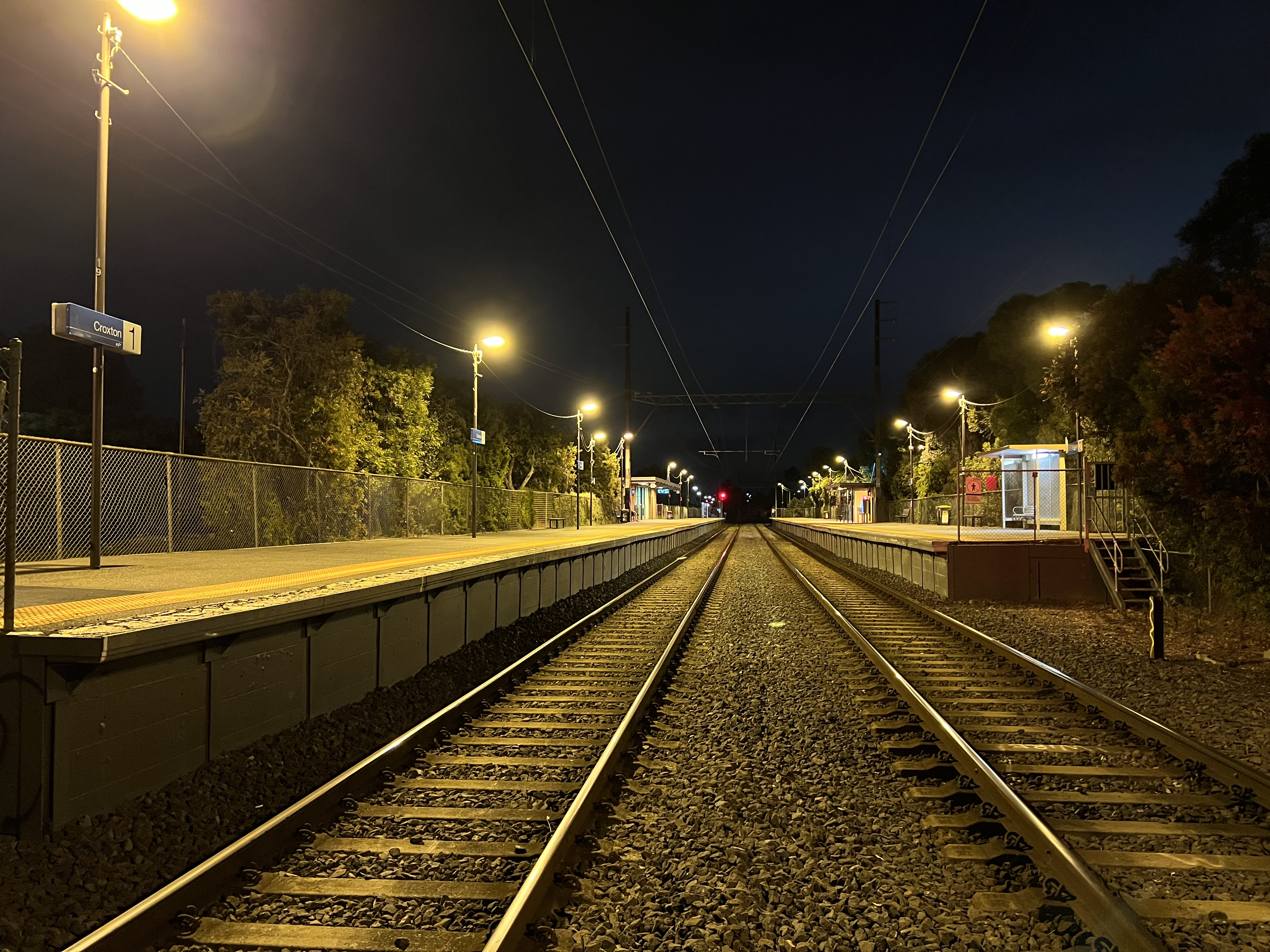
Southbound view of the station platforms at night, November 2023

Croxton has two side platforms. It is served by Mernda line trains.

Croxton platform arrangement
Platform	Line	Destination	Service Type	Source
1	Mernda line	Flinders Street	All stations and limited express services	
2	Mernda line	Mernda	All stations	

== Transport links ==
Yarra Trams operates two routes via Croxton station:

- : West Preston – Victoria Harbour (Docklands)
- : Bundoora RMIT – Waterfront City (Docklands)
