= Belle =

Belle may refer to:

== People and fictional characters ==
- Belle (given name), a list of people and fictional characters
- Belle (surname), a list of people
- Southern belle, a stock character representing a young woman of the American South's upper class

== Brands and enterprises ==
- Belle Air, a former airline with headquarters in Tirana, Albania
- Belle Air Europe, a subsidiary of Belle Air in the Kosovo
- Belle Baby Carriers, an American baby carrier manufacturer
- Belle International, a Chinese footwear retailer

== Film and television ==
- Belle (1973 film), a Belgian-French drama film by André Delvaux
- Belle (2013 film), a British film by Amma Asante
- Belle (2021 film), a Japanese animated film by Mamoru Hosoda
- Belle's, an American comedy TV series that premiered in 2013

== Music ==
- Belle (album), a 2011 album by Bic Runga
- "Belle" (Patrick Fiori, Daniel Lavoie and Garou song), a song from the 1998 musical adaptation of Victor Hugo's novel Notre Dame de Paris
- "Belle" (Disney song), a song written for Disney's 1991 film Beauty and the Beast
- Belle (2014 soundtrack), the soundtrack for the 2013 British drama film Belle
- Belle (2021 soundtrack), the soundtrack for the 2021 Japanese animated film Belle
- Belle, a 1961 musical by Wolf Mankowitz (lyrics) and Monty Norman (music)
- "Belle", a 1977 song written by Al Green, Fred Jordan and Reuben Fairfax, Jr.

== Places ==
- Belle, Flanders or Bailleul, Nord, a commune in France
- Belle, Udupi, a village in India
- Belle, Missouri, a town in the United States
- Belle Township, Holt County, Nebraska, United States
- Belle, West Virginia, a town in the United States
- Belle Gardens, a town in Tobago
- Belle River (disambiguation)
- Mount Belle, a mountain in New Zealand

== Railway trains ==
- Bournemouth Belle, a named train run by the Southern Railway (Great Britain) from 1931 until 1948
- Brighton Belle, a passenger train operated by the London, Brighton and South Coast Railway
- Devon Belle, a passenger train operated by the Southern Railway and then British Railways from 1947 to 1954

== Science and technology ==
- Belle (chess machine), an early chess computer
- Belle experiment, an accelerator-based particle physics experiment
- Belle, the current version of Nokia's Symbian mobile operating system

== Ships ==
- La Belle (ship), a ship lost in 1686 during a French colonization attempt in Texas
- USCS Belle (1848), a survey ship in service with the United Coast Survey from 1848 to 1857
- USS Belle (1864), a Union Navy steamer in the American Civil War

== Other uses ==
- Belle (magazine), an Australian design magazine
- Hurricane Belle, a storm of the 1976 Atlantic hurricane season

== See also ==
- Bel (disambiguation)
- BEL (disambiguation)
- Bell (disambiguation)
- La Belle (disambiguation)
- Belles (disambiguation)
- Belle Isle (disambiguation)
- Belles belles belles (musical), a 2003 musical by Redha
- Belle, Flux et Trente-et-Un, a 17th-century gambling card game
