= Bel =

Bel may refer to:

== Mythology ==
- Belenus or Bel, a Celtic deity
- Bel (mythology), a title (meaning "lord" or "master") for various gods in Babylonian religion

== People ==
- Bel (name)
- Annabel Linquist, known as Bel, American artist, musician, and entrepreneur
- Isabel Whelan, known as Bel, American musician

== Places ==
- Bél, the Hungarian name for Beliu Commune, Arad County, Romania
- Bel Mountain, in the Zagros Mountains of western and southwestern Iran
- Bel, Iran (disambiguation)
- Bel, Osh, village in Osh Region, Kyrgyzstan
- Bel, Syria, village in Aleppo Governorate
- Temple of Bel in Palmyra, Syria

== Languages ==
- Bel languages, spoken in northern Papua New Guinea
- ISO 639 code for the Belarusian language

== Other uses ==
- Groupe Bel, a France-based multinational cheese distributor
- Bel (unit), a unit of gain or loss equal to ten decibels

== See also ==
- BEL (disambiguation)
- Bell (disambiguation)
- Belle (disambiguation)
- BEI (disambiguation)
- Be-1 (disambiguation) including Be1
