= BEL =

BEL can be an abbreviation for:

- The ISO 3166-1 alpha-3 and UNDP country code for Belgium
- BEL or bell character in the C0 control code set
- Belair line (timetable code: BEL), Adelaide, Australia
- Belarusian language, in the ISO 639-2 and SIL country code lists
- Bell railway station, Melbourne
- Belize Electricity Limited, a Belizean power utility
- Bharat Electronics Limited, an Indian state-owned aerospace and defence electronics company
- Bellingham (Amtrak station), Washington, United States; Amtrak station code BEL
- Behind Enemy Lines (disambiguation)
- Isabel Whelan, professionally known as BEL, an American musician
- Val de Cães International Airport 3-letter IATA airport code in Belém, Brazil
- The ICAO code for Brussels Airlines, a Belgian airline

== See also ==
- Bel (disambiguation)
- Bell (disambiguation)
- Belle (disambiguation)
