= Bel (name) =

Bel is both a surname and a given name. Notable people with the name include:

== Given name ==
- Annabel Linquist, American artist, musician, and entrepreneur
- Bel Kaufman (1911–2014), American teacher and author, best known for writing the novel Up the Down Staircase
- Bel Mooney (born 1946), English journalist and broadcaster
- Bel Olid (born 1977), Spanish writer and translator
- Bel Powley (born 1992), British actress
- Bel Pozueta (born 1965), Basque politician
- Bel Priestley (born 2003), British actress and internet personality
- Eógan Bél (died 542), a king of Connacht (in what is now Ireland)

== Surname ==
=== Bel / Bél ===
- Alfred Bel (1873–1945), French scholar and orientalist
- Andrés Mir Bel (born 1987), Spanish field hockey player
- Barbara Bel Geddes (1922–2005), American actress
- Cletus Bél (died 1245), Hungarian bishop
- Clyde F. Bel Jr. (1932–2014), American politician
- Ferran Bel (born 1965), Spanish economist and politician
- Frédérique Bel (born 1975), French actress and model
- Jean-Pierre Bel (born 1951), French politician
- Jérôme Bel (born 1965), French dancer and choreographer
- Jules Bel (1842–1904), French cheese maker
- Ka Bel (1933–2008), Filipino politician
- Laurent Bel (born 1966), French fencer
- Léon Bel (1878–1957), French businessman, founder of The Laughing Cow
- M'bilia Bel (born 1959), Congolese musician
- Madeleine Hartog-Bel (born 1947), Peruvian Miss World
- Matthias Bel (1684–1749), Hungarian scholar, polymath and Lutheran pastor
- Norman Bel Geddes (1893–1958), American theatrical and industrial designer

== Fictional characters ==
- Bel Arvardan, in Isaac Asimov's novel Pebble in the Sky
- Bel Riose, in Isaac Asimov's Foundation series
- Bel, a recurring character in Series 13 of Doctor Who
- Bel (Dungeons & Dragons), lord of the first of The Nine Hells, in Dungeons and Dragons games

== See also ==
- Le Bel
