= BEI =

BEI or B.E.I. may refer to:

- Binary ethylenimine, an inactivant used in the inactivation of the foot-and-mouth disease virus
- Business Entity Identifier, an ISO 9362 Bank Identifier Code (BIC) assigned to a non-financial entity
- Balanced Ecology, Inc.
- Bureau des enquêtes indépendantes), Quebec's police watchdog
- Indonesia Stock Exchange or Bursa Efek Indonesia

== See also ==
- Bei (disambiguation)
- Bel (disambiguation)
- Be-1 (disambiguation) including BE1 and Be1
