= Be-1 =

Be-1 or BE1 may refer to:

- Be 1, a Belgian premium television channel
- Beriev Be-1, an experimental WIG aircraft
- Blue Origin BE-1, a monopropellant peroxide rocket engine from Blue Origin
- Nissan Be-1, a retro-style automobile
- Royal Aircraft Factory B.E.1, a pre-war prototype British biplane
- Brazilian destroyer escort Bertioga (Be1)
- Be1 NFA, a Lithuanian soccer team from Kaunas, Lithuania
- BlackEnergy 1 (BE1), a piece of computer malware

== See also ==
- BEI (disambiguation)
- bel (disambiguation)
- BE (disambiguation)
