= Preston railway station, Melbourne =

Railway station in Melbourne, Australia

Preston
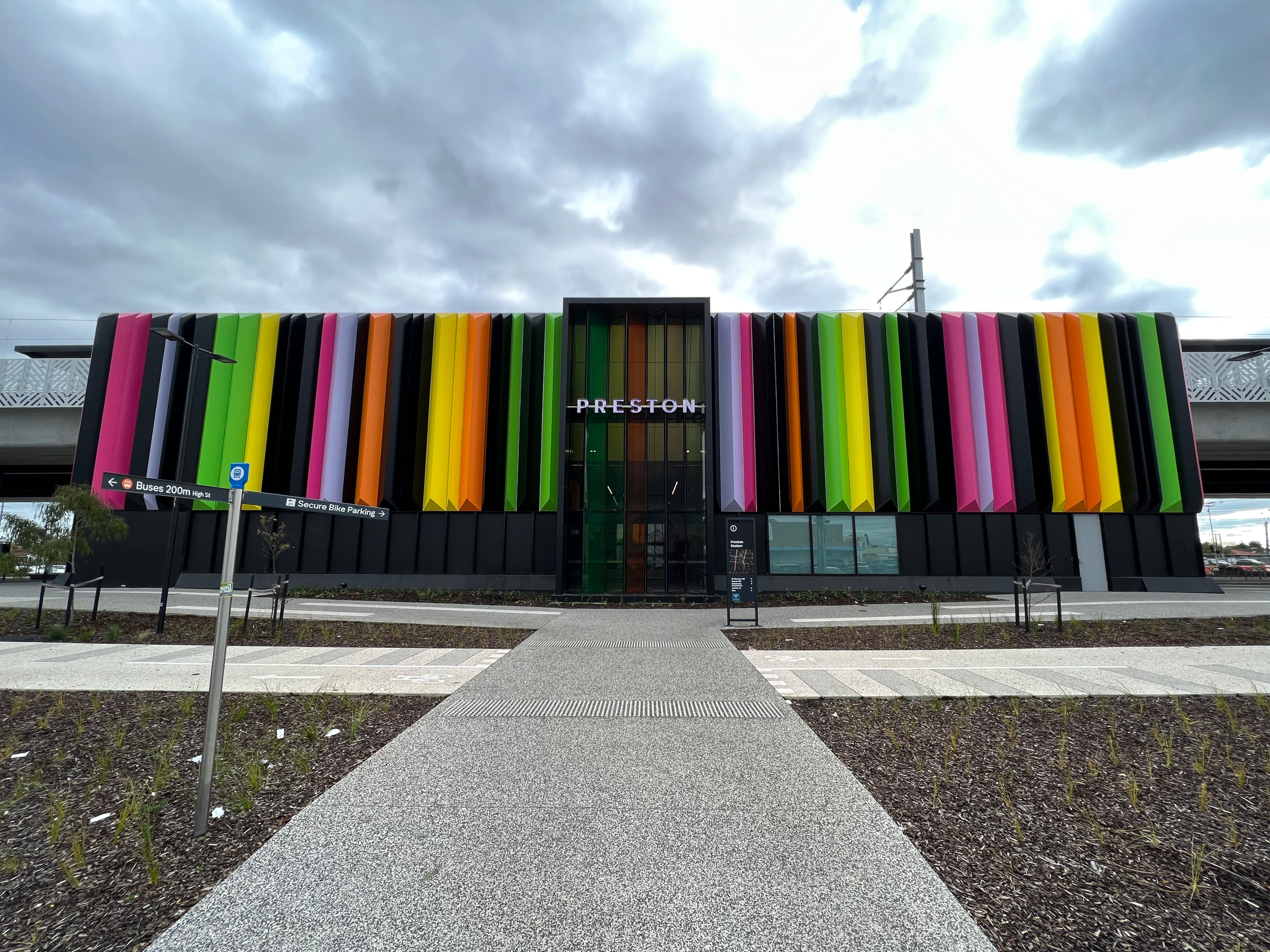
- Eastern facade of Preston station in July 2023

General information
- Location: Murray Road/St Georges Road, Preston, Victoria 3072; City of Darebin; Australia
- Coordinates: 37°44′19″S 145°00′02″E
- System: PTV commuter rail station
- Owner: VicTrack
- Operator: Metro Trains
- Line: Mernda
- Distance: 12.47 kilometres (7.75 mi) from Southern Cross
- Platforms: 2 (1 island)
- Tracks: 2
- Connections: Bus

Construction
- Structure type: Elevated
- Parking: 254
- Cycle facilities: Yes
- Accessible: Yes—step free access

Other information
- Status: Operational, premium station
- Station code: PRE
- Fare zone: Myki zone 1/2
- Website: Public Transport Victoria

History
- Opened: 8 October 1889; 136 years ago
- Rebuilt: 1973; 5 September 2022 (LXRP)
- Electrified: July 1921 (1500 V DC overhead)
- Former names: Preston-Murray Road (1889–1905); Murray (1905–1909)

Passengers
- 2018–2019: 862,540
- 2019–2020: 648,650 ▼24.79%
- 2020–2021: 317,300 ▼51.08%
- 2021–2022: 238,850 ▼24.72%

Services
Preceding station	Metro Trains	Following station
Bell towards Flinders Street	Mernda line	Regent towards Mernda
Track layout
Location

Preston station is a railway station operated by Metro Trains Melbourne on the Mernda line, part of the Melbourne rail network. It serves the north-eastern suburb of Preston in Melbourne, Victoria, Australia.

The station opened on 8 October 1889, with the former ground level station closed and demolished in May 2022 and the current elevated station provided in September 2022 by the Level Crossing Removal Project. The station was renamed two times, which it initially opened as Preston-Murray Road upon its opening in 1889. It was renamed to Murray on 1 August 1905, then was given its current name of "Preston" on 1 December 1909.

Preston is an elevated premium station, consisting of a single island platform with two faces connected by a staircase, lifts and a ground level concourse. The station fully complies with the Disability Discrimination Act 1992 and is accessible as there is a lift connecting to the ground level concourse and the station platforms. Preston station's design reflects the influence of Preston Market. The colour palette for the station was inspired by Preston Market, it features an array of vivid colours with black vertical folds, resembling a barcode used by market vendors.

The station is served by four bus routes, including Dysons bus routes 552 and 553 and Ventura bus routes 903 and 527.

== Description ==
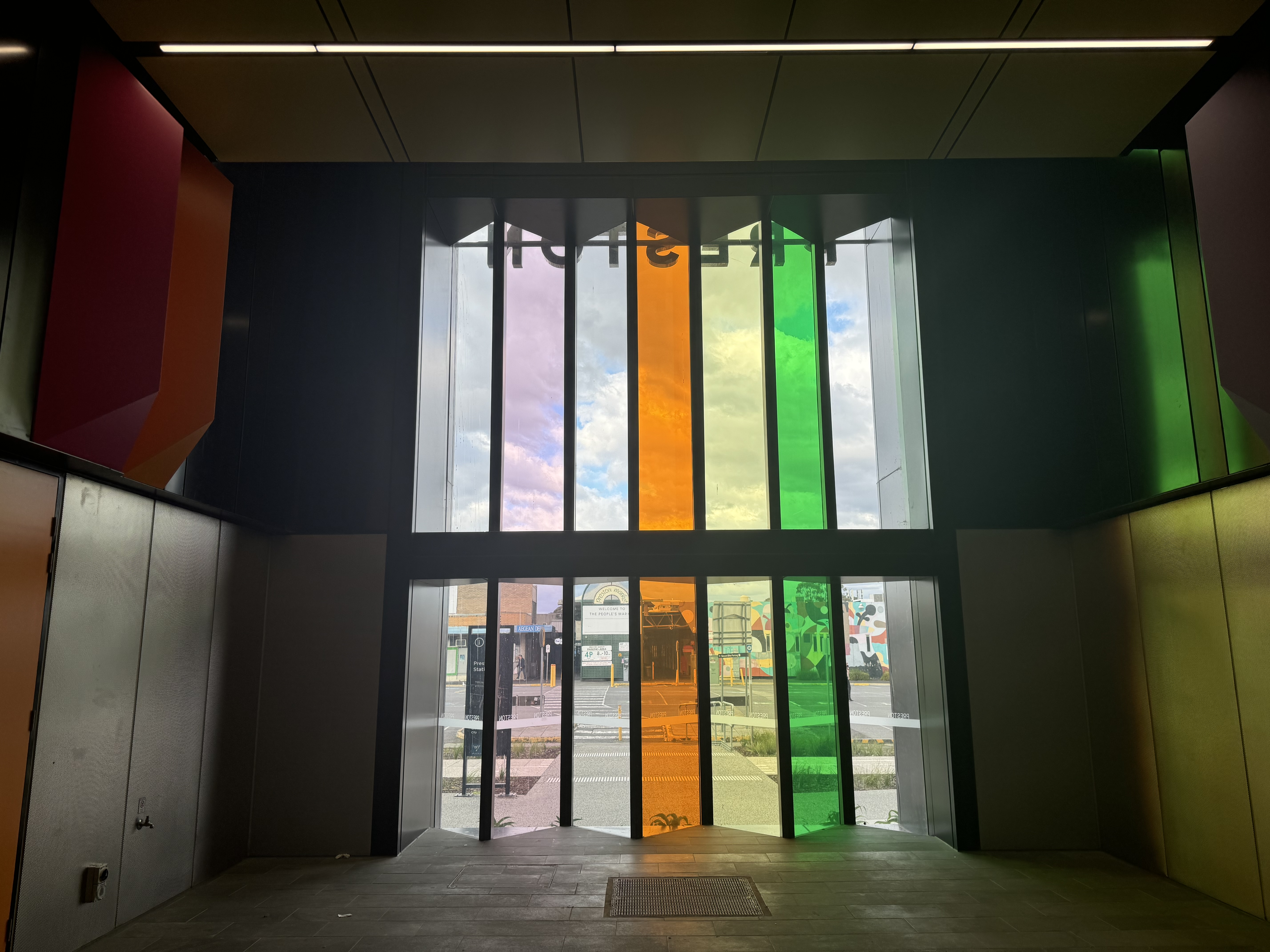
The station features vivid colours in the facade seen from the southern, northern and eastern sides

Preston railway station is located in the north-eastern suburb of Preston in Melbourne, Victoria, Australia. The station is owned by VicTrack, a state government agency and the station is operated by Metro Trains Melbourne. The adjacent stations are Bell station up towards Flinders Street and Regent station down towards Mernda.

The island platform is approximately 160 m (524 ft 11 in) long. The station features a ground level concourse, accessible from the elevated station platform via a lift and stairs. There is one main station building, opened in 2022, which contains a waiting room, a customer service, PSO office and a ground level concourse inside the main station building.

The station incorporates sustainable features such as solar panels, rainwater reuse, LED lighting and environmentally sustainable materials to reduce greenhouse gas emissions. The Bruce Street area features a playground, BBQ facilities, seating areas and all-ages fitness facilities. There are 254 car, 42 secure bike and 21 secure bike cage parking at the station. Per the Victorian Government, the station design complies with the requirements of the Disability Discrimination Act 1992.

== History ==
=== Original ground level station (1888–2022) ===
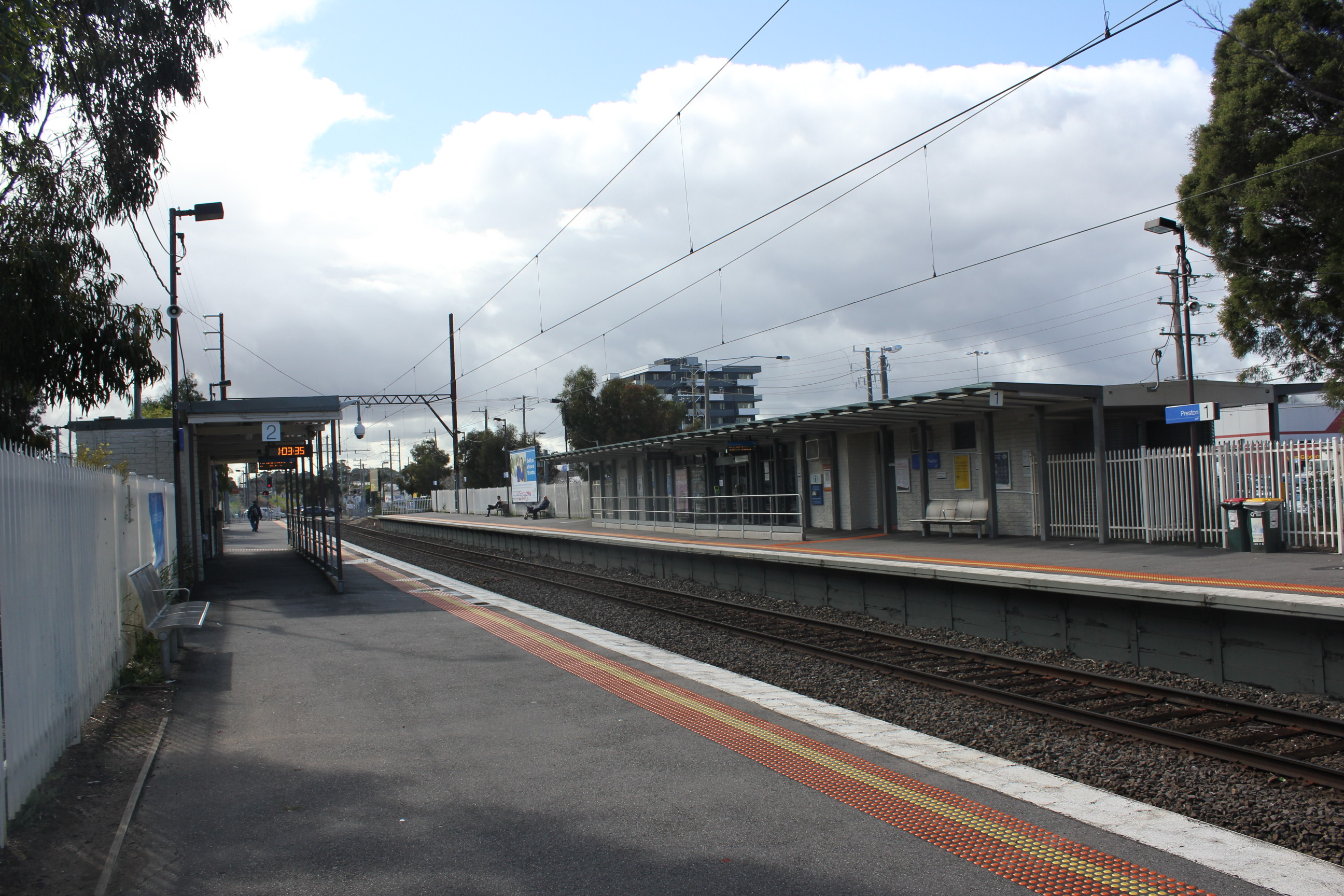
Northbound view from the former ground level Platform 2, August 2015

Preston station opened on 8 October 1889, when the Inner Circle line was extended from North Fitzroy to Reservoir. Preston station, like the suburb itself, was named after Preston in Sussex, England. The name was chosen by Edward Wood, who was originally from Sussex and, in 1850, opened a general store at the corner of the current day intersection of High and Wood Streets.

In 1967, boom barriers replaced hand gates at the former Cramer Street and Murray Road level crossings, which were located in the up and down directions respectively. In 1973, the former ground level station buildings were provided, replacing the original 1889 structures. In 1998, Preston was upgraded to a premium station.

=== Level Crossing Removal Project ===
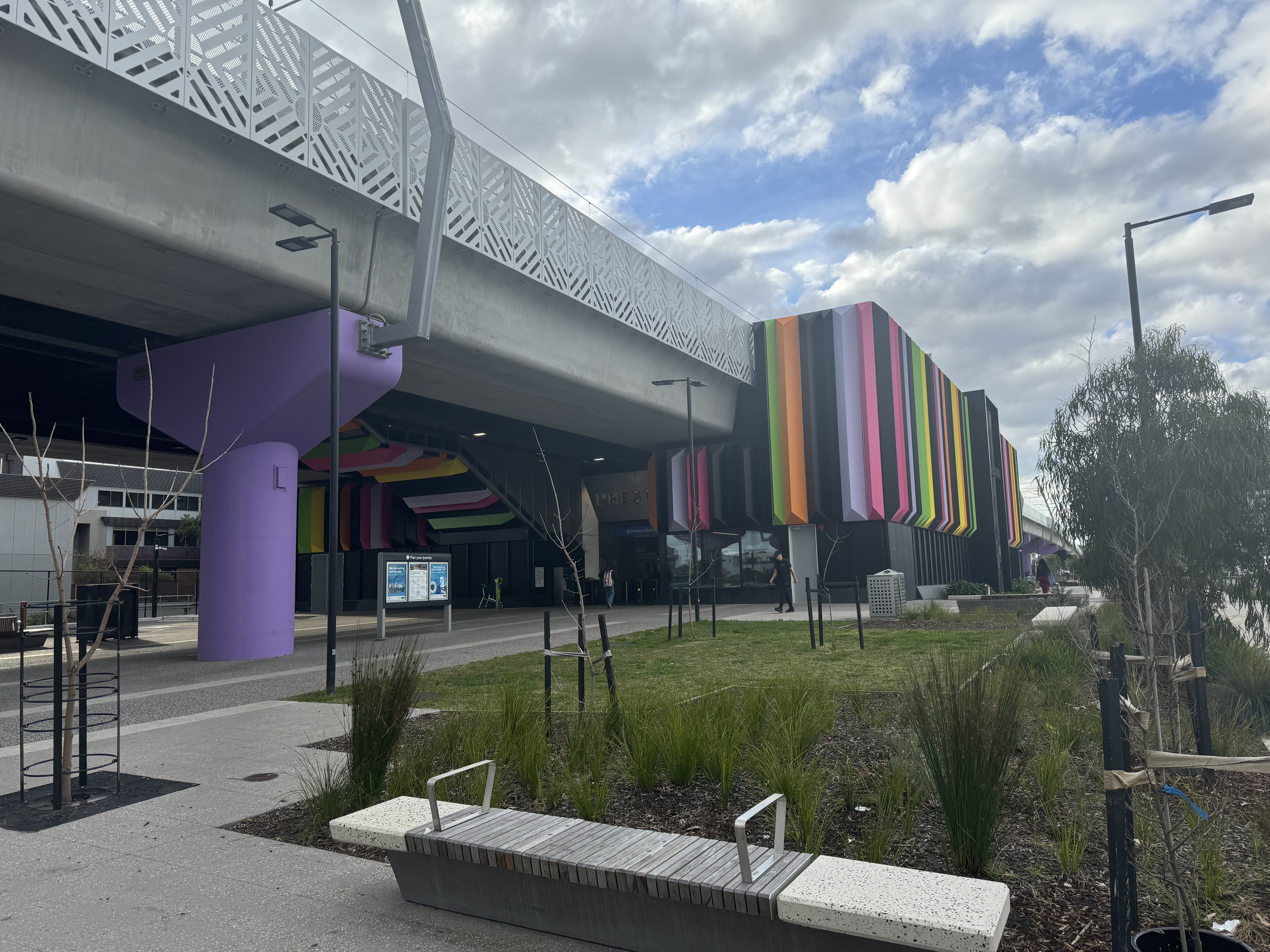
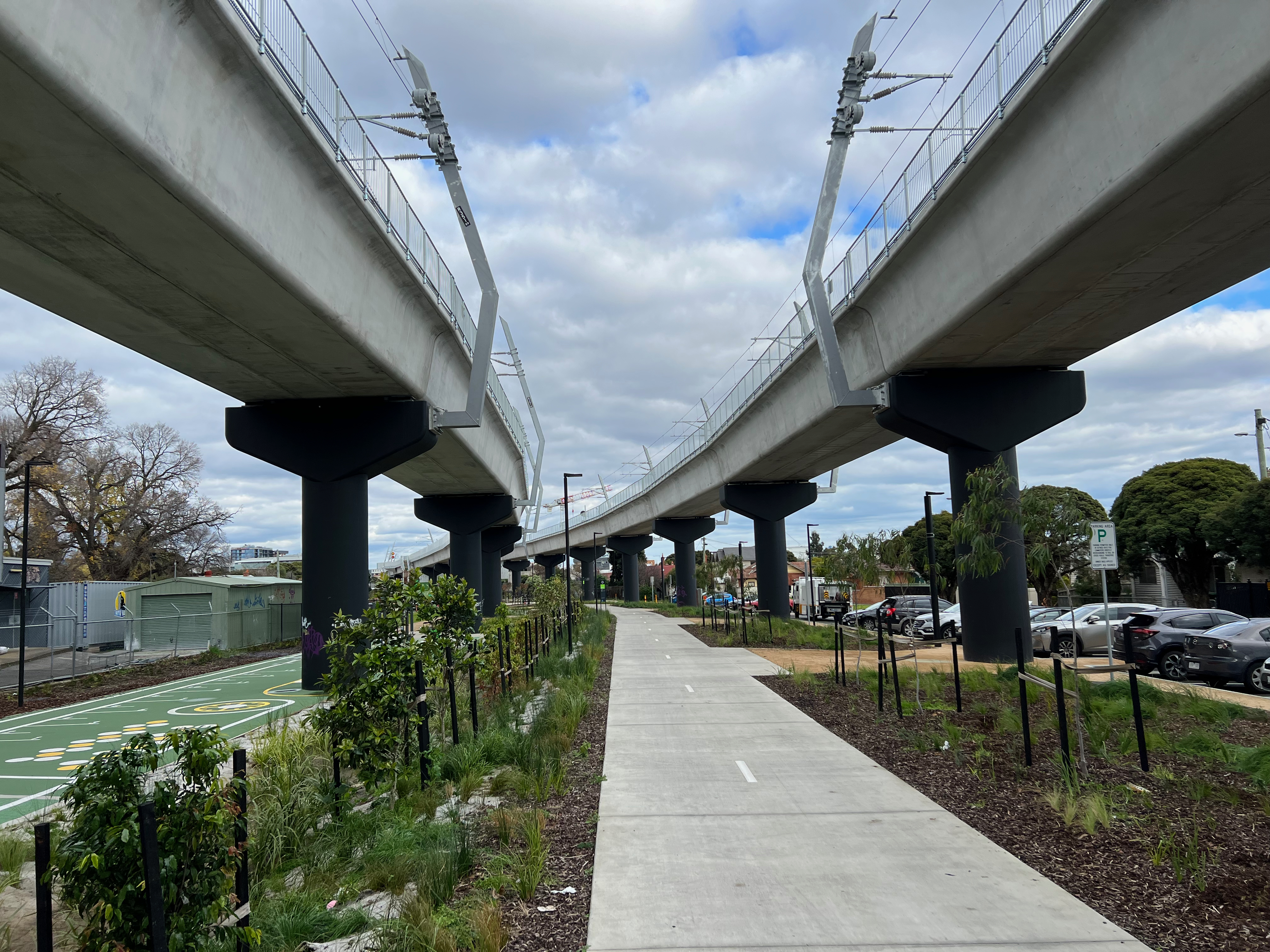
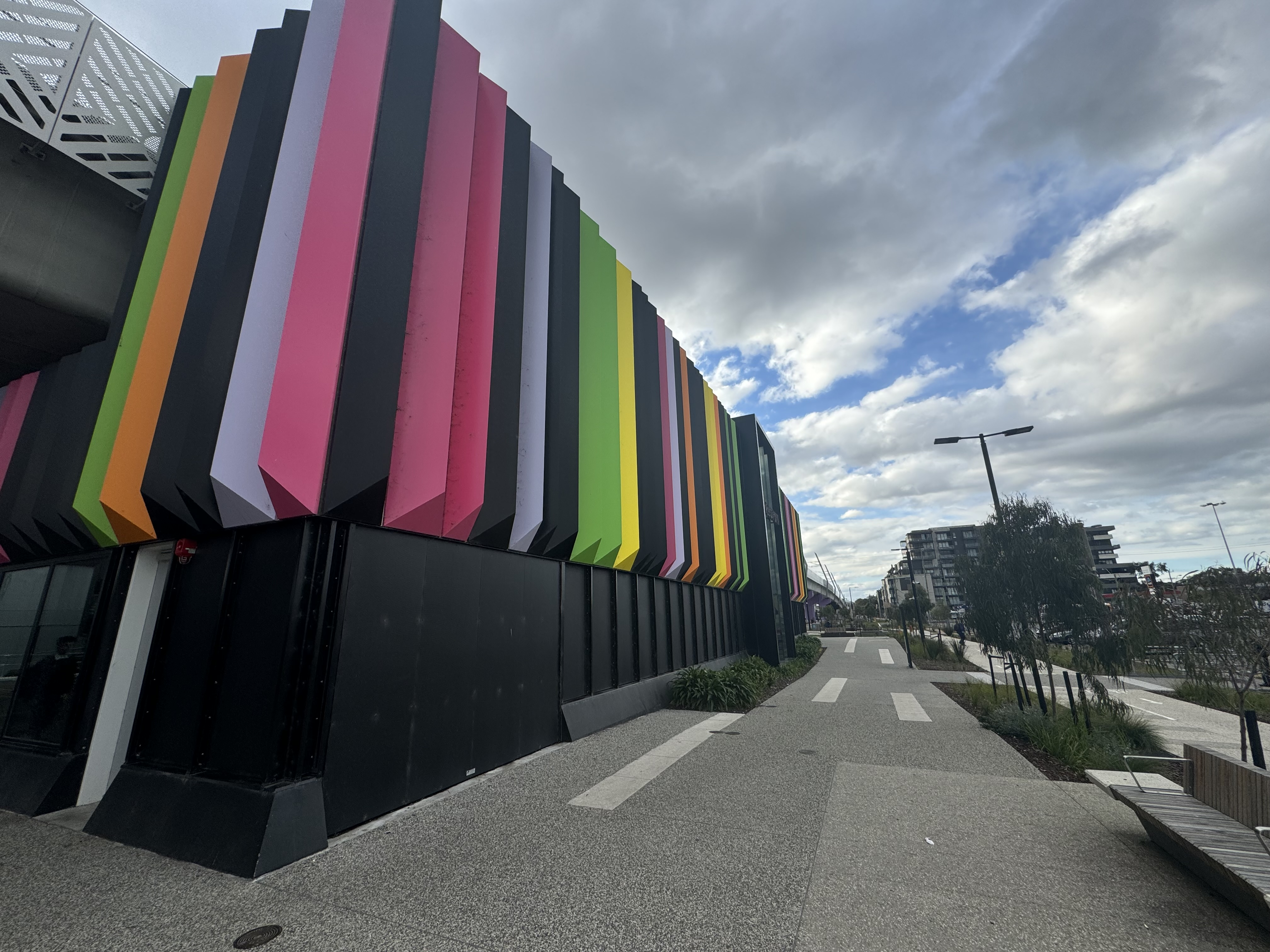
The forecourt and landscaping on the eastern side of the station (top), the railway line leading towards Preston station near Bruce Street (middle), a side view of the vivid colours of the main station facade (bottom)

On 30 November 2018, the Andrews government announced that the Level Crossing Removal Project would remove the Oakover Road, Cramer Street and Murray Road level crossings, along with 23 other level crossings in Melbourne as part of a $6.6 billion program, Bell Street was already listed to be removed in 2014. At the same time, the elevated railway option was chosen.

During construction, the Mernda line was never closed for more than two weeks at a time in 2021 and 2022 to facilitate further piling and excavation works. Between 5 May to 12 May 2021, the original Preston station building was demolished to make way for the new elevated railway bridge, with the Mernda line was closed during that time to install temporary equipment at the station. Once the temporary station opened, major excavation works were able to begin. Construction of the first part of the U-through bridge section made up of two L-shaped beams for the elevated railway bridge installed and digging for the 114 piers also started to occur during this time.

Between 17 May to 30 May 2022, the Mernda line was shut down for 12 days to remove the Oakover Road, Bell Street, Cramer Street and Murray Road level crossings in order to get the first part of the elevated railway bridge ready and demolish the old ground level station platforms. On 30 May 2022, the first part of the 2 kilometre bridge opened with a temporary single track until 26 August 2022. During construction, the Mernda Line could not be closed for longer than 12 days due to the requirement of trains to regularly access the Epping maintenance yard facility.

On 5 September 2022, the rebuilt station opened to the public. The elevated station opened in a basic state, with lifts, paving and additional exits opened on the north side of the station. In 2023, the open spaces were completed. The Preston station area features an improved cycling and walking paths which opened in late 2022, expansive open space, newer and safer connections to popular local destinations and the station facades' bright colour which features a barcode reflecting the vivid colours of produce found at Preston Market.

== Platforms and services ==
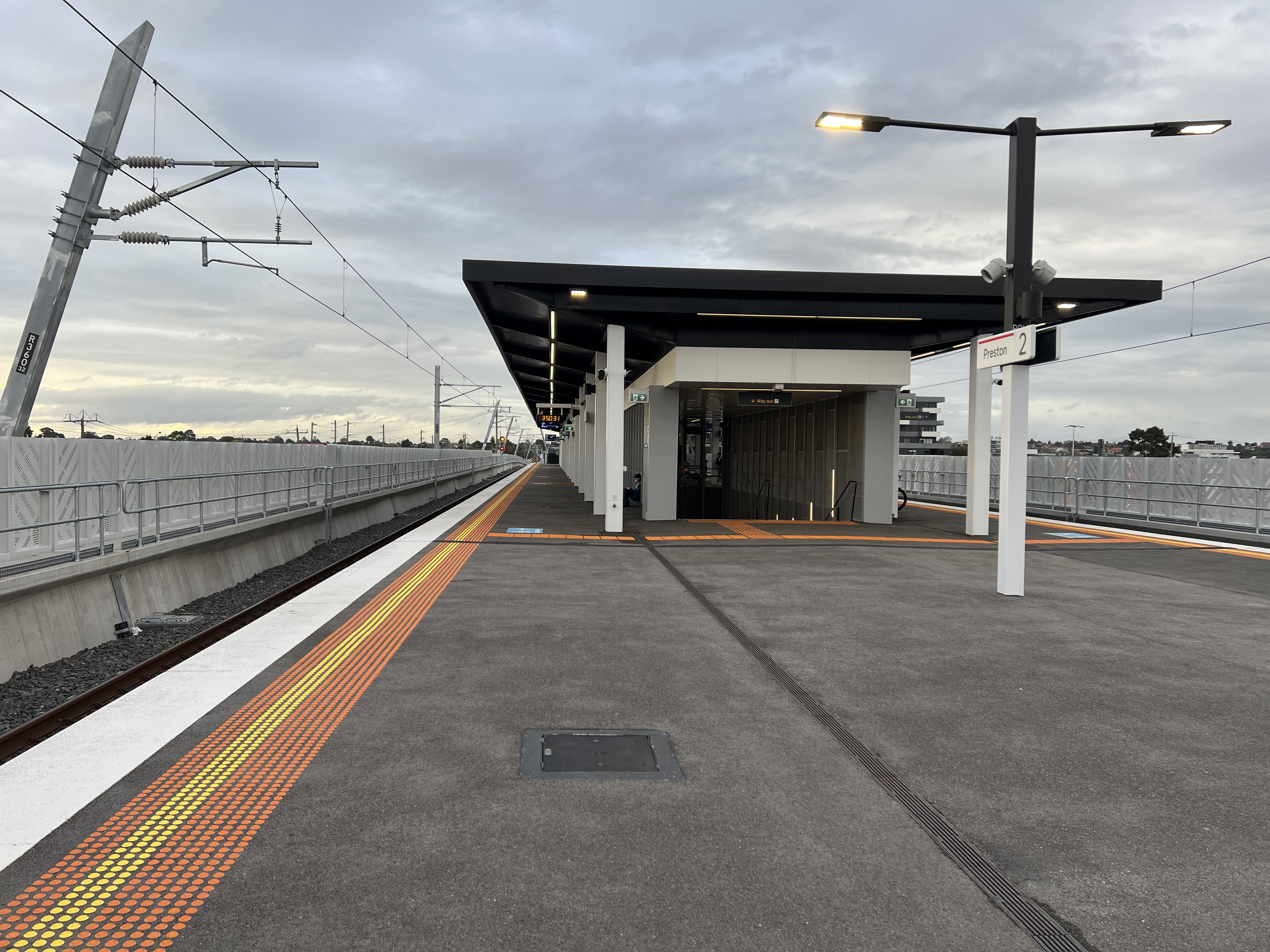
Northbound view from Platform 2, June 2023

Preston has a single island platform with two faces. The station is currently served by the Mernda line, part of the metropolitan railway network. The Mernda line runs from Mernda station, north-east of Melbourne, joining with the Hurstbridge line at Clifton Hill station before travelling through Flinders Street station and back through the City Loop.

Preston platform arrangement
Platform	Line	Destination	Service Type	Source
1	Mernda line	Flinders Street	All stations and limited express services	
2	Mernda line	Mernda	All stations	

== Transport links ==
Preston station has four bus route connections and no tram connections. The route 552 and 553 bus are operated by Kinetic Melbourne, while the route 527 bus is operated by Ventura Bus Lines and the SmartBus route 903 operated by Kinetic Melbourne. Bus routes 552 and 553 operates from the nearby High Street, east of Preston station. The route 552 operates from North East Reservoir to Northcote Plaza while the route 553 bus operates from Preston to West Preston. Bus routes 527 and 903 operate from the nearby Murray Road, north-east of Preston station. The route 527 bus operates from Gowrie railway station to Northland Shopping Centre while the route 903 operates from Altona railway station to Mordialloc.

Bus connections:

- 552 : North East Reservoir – Northcote Plaza
- 553 : Preston – West Preston
- SmartBus 903 : Altona station – Mordialloc
- 527 : Gowrie station – Northland Shopping Centre
