= Regent railway station =

Railway station in Melbourne, Australia

Regent
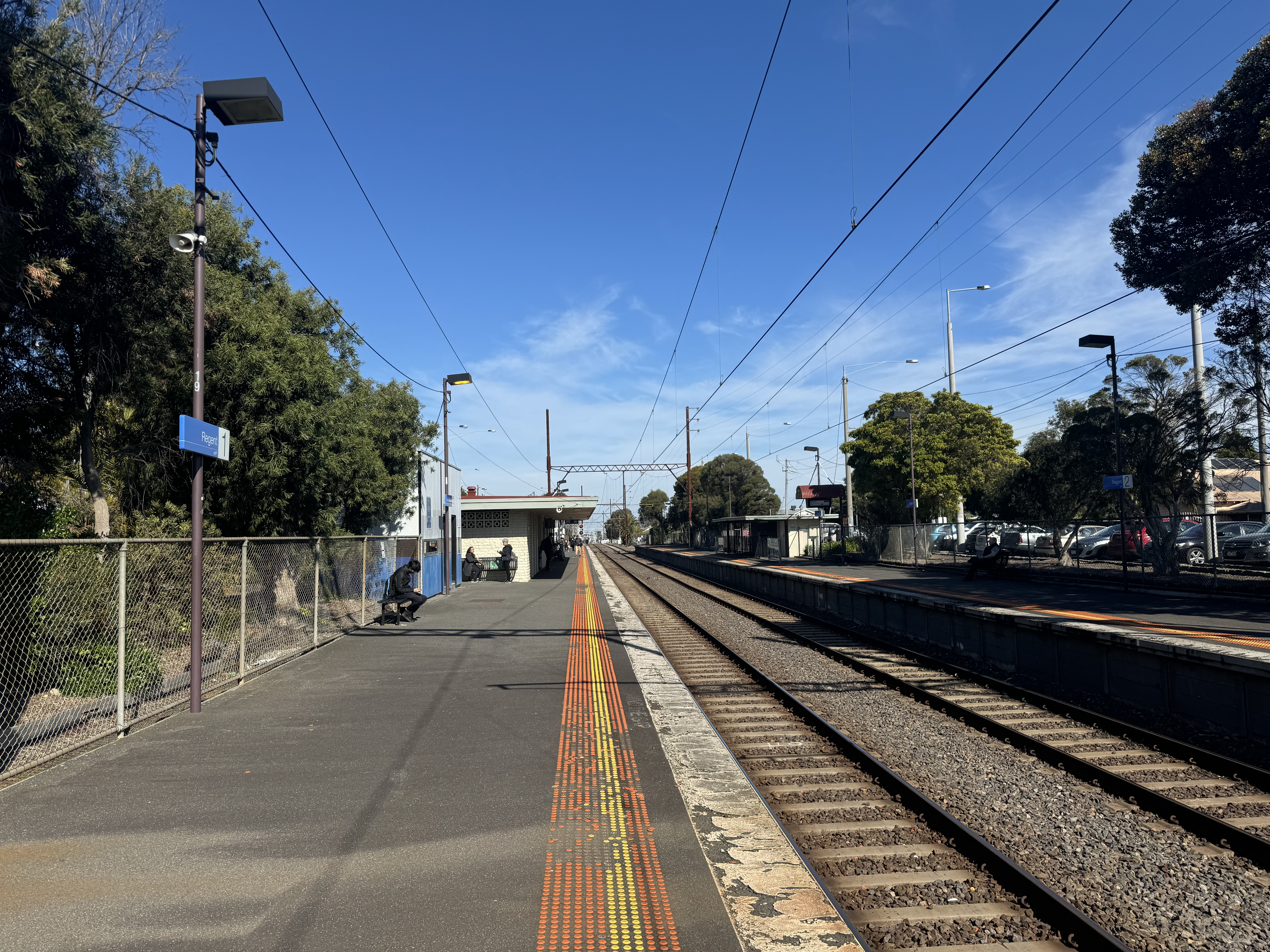
- Southbound view from Platform 1, August 2024

General information
- Location: Robinson Road, Reservoir, Victoria 3073; City of Darebin; Australia
- Coordinates: 37°43′42″S 145°00′10″E
- System: PTV commuter rail station
- Owner: VicTrack
- Operator: Metro Trains
- Line: Mernda
- Distance: 13.61 kilometres from Southern Cross
- Platforms: 2 side
- Tracks: 2
- Connections: Bus

Construction
- Structure type: Ground
- Parking: 159
- Cycle facilities: 6
- Accessible: Yes

Other information
- Status: Operational, host station
- Station code: REG
- Fare zone: Myki zone 1/2
- Website: Public Transport Victoria

History
- Opened: 8 October 1889; 136 years ago
- Rebuilt: 1970
- Electrified: July 1921 (1500 V DC overhead)
- Former names: Preston-Regent Street (1889-1905)

Passengers
- 2005–2006: 369,324
- 2006–2007: 403,278 ▲9.19%
- 2007–2008: 480,572 ▲19.16%
- 2008–2009: 540,046 ▲12.37%
- 2009–2010: 551,073 ▲2.04%
- 2010–2011: 523,090 ▼5.08%
- 2011–2012: 483,623 ▼7.54%
- 2012–2013: Not measured
- 2013–2014: 449,704 ▼7.01%
- 2014–2015: 449,735 ▲0.006%
- 2015–2016: 484,454 ▲7.71%
- 2016–2017: 472,130 ▼2.54%
- 2017–2018: 485,409 ▲2.81%
- 2018–2019: 490,050 ▲0.95%
- 2019–2020: 399,650 ▼18.45%
- 2020–2021: 170,900 ▼57.2%
- 2021–2022: 176,100 ▲3.04%
- 2022–2023: 323,850 ▲83.9%

Services
Preceding station	Metro Trains	Following station
Preston towards Flinders Street	Mernda line	Reservoir towards Mernda
Track layout
Location

Regent station is a railway station operated by Metro Trains Melbourne on the Mernda line, which is part of the Melbourne rail network. It serves the northern suburb of Reservoir, in Melbourne, Victoria, Australia, and opened on 8 October 1889, with the current station provided in 1970.

Initially opened as Preston-Regent Street, the station was given its current name of Regent on 1 August 1905.

== History ==
Named after nearby Regent Street, Regent station opened when the Inner Circle line was extended from North Fitzroy to Reservoir.

In 1967, boom barriers replaced hand gates at the Regent Street level crossing, located nearby in the up direction from the station. In 1970, the present station buildings were provided.

== Platforms and services ==
Regent has two side platforms and is served by Mernda line trains.

Regent platform arrangement
Platform	Line	Destination	Service Type	Source
1	Mernda line	Flinders Street	All stations and limited express services	
2	Mernda line	Mernda	All stations	

== Transport links ==
Kinetic Melbourne operates three bus routes via Regent station, under contract to Public Transport Victoria:

- 552 : North East Reservoir – Northcote Plaza
- 553 : Preston – West Preston
- 567 : to Northcote
