= Lebel (disambiguation) =

Lebel is a surname.

Lebel or LeBel may also refer to:

== Firearms ==
- Lebel Model 1886 rifle
- 8mm Lebel (8×50mmR French) cartridge used in the Lebel rifle
- Modèle 1892 revolver, often referred to as the Lebel M1892
- The 8×27mmR Regimetaire Mle 92 cartridge, used in the Modèle 1892, and also known as the 8mm Lebel Revolver and the 8mm French Ord; see 8 mm caliber

== Other ==
- Lebel-sur-Quévillon, Quebec, Canada, a city
- LeBel Royal Commission, 1945 inquiry into the premier of Ontario
