= Bei =

Bei may refer to:

- North, commonly encountered as 北 (Mandarin: běi) in Chinese placenames
- Chinese stelae (碑, bēi)
- Bei River, a tributary of the Pearl River in southern China
- Bei (surname) (贝/貝), a Chinese surname
- (mathematics) bei, a Kelvin function
- Yelü Bei (899–937), Khitan prince (Yelü being his clan name)

== See also ==
- BEI (disambiguation)
- Bey
