= Belle (2014 soundtrack) =

Belle (Original Motion Picture Soundtrack)

Film score by Rachel Portman
- Released: 6 May 2014
- Recorded: 2013–2014
- Studios: Smecky Music, Prague; Angel Recording, London
- Genre: Film score
- Length: 40:10
- Label: Varèse Sarabande
- Producer: Rachel Portman

Rachel Portman chronology
| The Right Kind of Wrong (2013) | Belle (2014) | Dolphin Tale 2 (2014) |

Belle (Original Motion Picture Soundtrack) is the soundtrack accompanying the 2013 film Belle directed by Amma Asante. The film's score is composed by Rachel Portman and released through Varèse Sarabande on 6 May 2014.

== Development ==
Belle's original score is composed by Rachel Portman who recalled on not sentimentally overdoing with the film's music. Her involvement was confirmed in May 2013, and the recording of the film's music being held at the Angel Recording Studios in London, and the Smecky Music Studios in Prague, with an 88-piece orchestra from the Prague Philharmonic Orchestra members performing. Marek Elznic, Jaromir Klepac, Zdenek "Bruce" Zindel and Lucie Svehlova were featured as the soloists. The musical score was released through Varèse Sarabande on 6 May 2014.

== Reception ==
Critic Alex Burns, who reviews classical music albums, summarized: "For Belle, Rachel Portman certainly hits the brief of a classic British period drama score. The simple melodies lined with magical orchestrations creates an effective score that sets the film up for what is to come." Justin Chang of Variety described the score as "unsubtly emotive". Mike Scott of NOLA.com called it as "lush, although at times overbearing". Allan Hunter of Screen International and Todd McCarthy of The Hollywood Reporter described it as "emotional" and "subtly overwhelming".

The score was shortlisted as one among the 113 contenders for the Best Original Score category at the 87th Academy Awards; however, it was not selected among the final list of nominations.

== Track listing ==
Belle (Original Motion Picture Soundtrack) track listing
| No. | Title | Length |
|---|---|---|
| 1. | "Main Titles" | 1:31 |
| 2. | "Laughter Montage" | 1:12 |
| 3. | "Are You Punishing Me?" | 1:57 |
| 4. | "The Portrait Is Revealed" | 1:46 |
| 5. | "Mirror" | 1:18 |
| 6. | "Time Pass to 1781" | 1:30 |
| 7. | "A Father's Goodbye" | 1:09 |
| 8. | "John Leaves Lord Mansfield's Tutorage" | 1:16 |
| 9. | "Sitting for Portrait" | 1:25 |
| 10. | "Dido Elizabeth Belle" | 1:50 |
| 11. | "John Pulls Dido Aside" | 2:13 |
| 12. | "The Zong" | 2:26 |
| 13. | "Dido Goes to Tavern" | 2:06 |
| 14. | "Maps" | 1:00 |
| 15. | "She Was Beautiful" | 1:34 |
| 16. | "James Manhandles Dido" | 2:08 |
| 17. | "Dido Removes Her Ring" | 1:50 |
| 18. | "You Already Loved Me" | 1:32 |
| 19. | "The Docks" | 0:43 |
| 20. | "Lord Mansfield Watches John" | 3:45 |
| 21. | "Dido Goes to Courts" | 1:30 |
| 22. | "Let Justice Be Done" | 2:10 |
| 23. | "You Would Be My Wife" | 2:19 |
| Total length: | | 40:10 |

== Personnel ==
Credits adapted from liner notes.

- Composer and producer – Rachel Portman
- Recording, mixing and mastering – Chris Dibble
- Music editors – Andy Glen, Yann McCullough
- Music supervision – Maggie Rodford
- Additional music supervision – Laura Nakhla
- Auricle control systems – Chris Cozens
- Executive producer – Mark Lo
- Musical assistance – Karen Westropp

Orchestra

- Performer – The City of Prague Philharmonic
- Orchestration – Youki Yamamoto
- Conductor – David Snell
- Orchestra contractor – James Fitzpatrick, Tadlow Music Ltd
- Copyist – Absolute Notation, Jiri Simunek
- Musical translator – Stanja Vomackova

Instruments

- Cello – Marek Elznic
- Piano – Jaromir Klepac
- Viola – Zdenek "Bruce" Zindel
- Violin – Lucie Svehlova
