= USCS Belle =

Coordinates: 30.151°N 85.697°W

History

United States
- Name: Belle
- Acquired: 1848
- Fate: Wrecked 1857
- Notes: Sank in 1853, but raised and repaired in 1854

General characteristics
- Type: Schooner
- Length: 60 ft (18 m)
- Beam: 16 ft (4.9 m)
- Draft: 4 ft (1.2 m)
- Propulsion: Sails
- Sail plan: Schooner-rigged

USCS Belle was a schooner that served as a survey vessel in the United States Coast Survey from 1848 to 1857.

The Coast Survey acquired Belle from the United States Army Quartermaster Department in 1848 and placed her in service along the Gulf Coast of the United States, where she spent her entire Coast Survey career.

Belle sank in a gale at the end of the 1853 surveying season, but she was raised in 1854 and returned to service. She was lost on an uncharted shoal off St. Andrews Bay, Florida, in 1857.
