= Belle Air =

Low-cost airline of Albania (2005–2013)

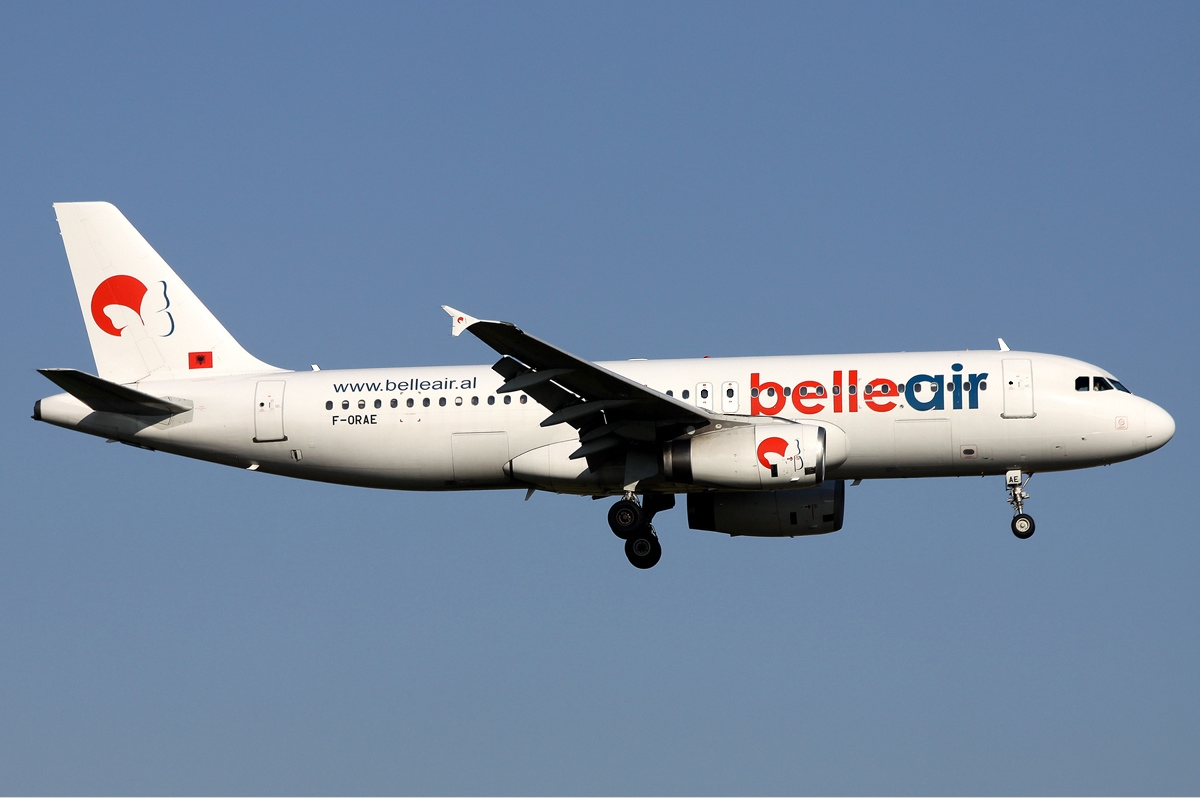
- Airbus A320
IATA	ICAO	Call sign
LZ	LBY	ALBAN-BELLE
- Founded: June 2005
- Commenced operations: 1 March 2006
- Ceased operations: 24 November 2013
- Hubs: Tirana International Airport Nënë Tereza
- Fleet size: 7
- Destinations: 24
- Headquarters: Tirana, Albania
- Key people: Arbi Xhelo, founder & CEO
- Website: belleair.al

Belle Air Sh.p.k (stylized as belleair) was a privately owned Albanian low-cost airline headquartered in Tirana.

== History ==
Belle Air was founded in June 2005 and launched the first scheduled connections on 1 March 2006. It ceased operations on 24 November 2013 . Their fleet has been returned to the lessors. Belle Air Europe was a sister company to the airline, founded in 2009 and based in Ancona, Italy. It ceased operations two days after the parent company.

== Destinations ==
Belle Air operated international flights on scheduled services to several cities in Belgium, Germany, Greece, Italy, Kosovo, Switzerland and the UK out of Tirana International Airport Nënë Tereza.

== Fleet ==
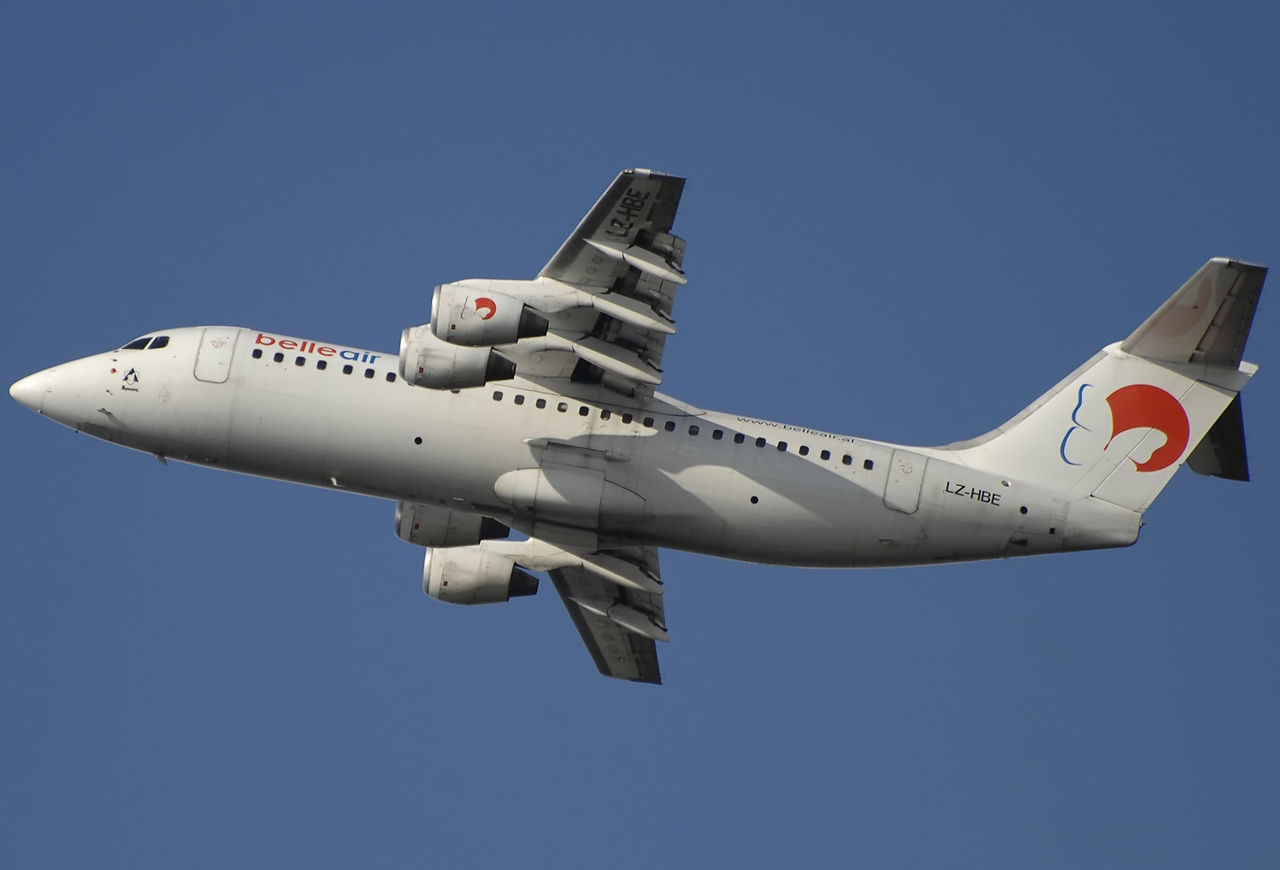
British Aerospace BAe 146-300

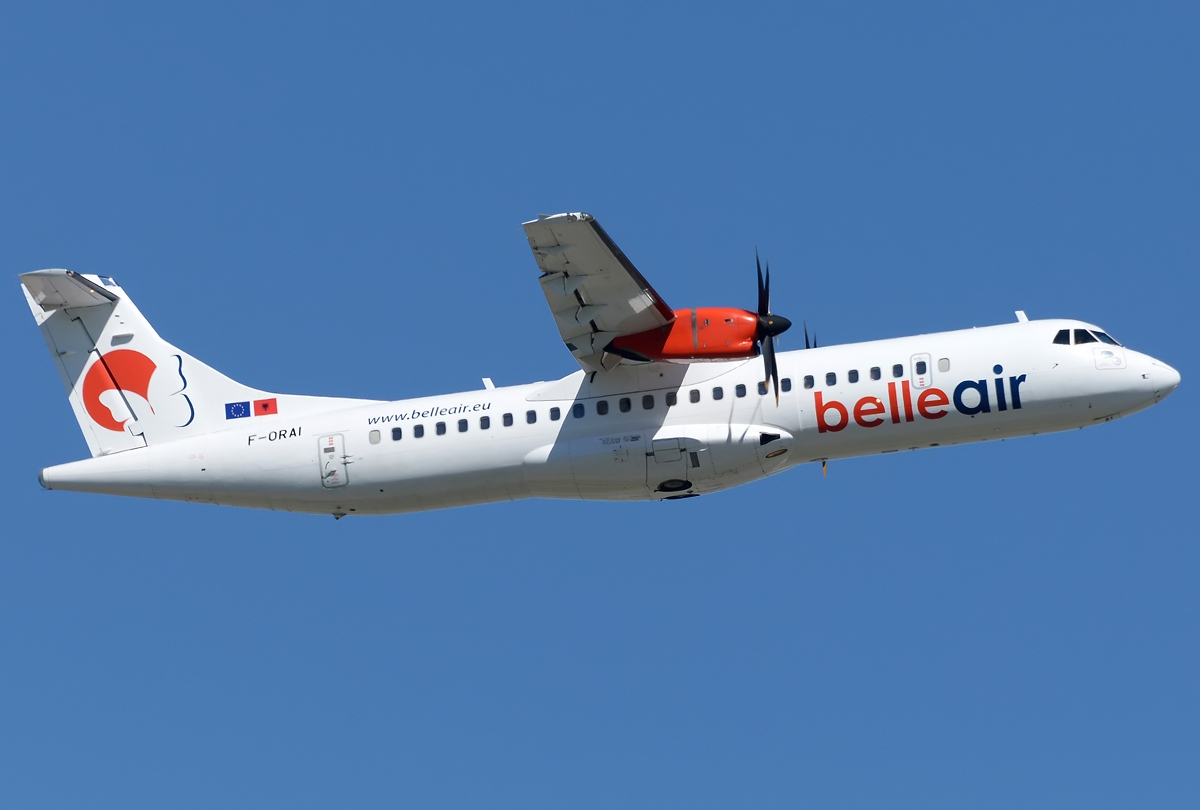
ATR 72

As of November 2013, at the time when it ceased operations, the Belle Air fleet consisted of the following aircraft:

Belle Air former fleet
Aircraft	Total	Passengers
Airbus A319-100	1	144
Airbus A320-200	4	180
ATR 72-500	2	68
Total	7	

== See also ==
- List of defunct airlines of Albania
