= Balanced Ecology =

Balanced Ecology, Inc.
- Founded: 2007
- Founder: Oranit (Orie) Gilad, PhD
- Purpose: Wildlife and Habitat Conservation
- Location: Texas
- Method: Research Communication, Public Education
- Members: Balanced Ecology is a non-member organization
- Employees: All volunteer staff
- Website: www.balancedecology.org

Balanced Ecology, Inc. (BEI) is a 501(c)(3), non-profit organization dedicated to the use of science and education to increase public knowledge of wildlife and habitat conservation and promote sustainable coexistence between people and nature. The organization was founded in 2007 to address unique conservation challenges in Texas, its home state, as well as other locations.

== Mission ==
The organization's mission is to promote sustainable coexistence between people and nature through scientific communication and public education.

Balanced Ecology emphasizes a balanced approach to conservation by promoting collaboration between interest groups such as state and federal agencies, academic institutions, conservation organizations, landowners, and other interested individuals, and by taking into consideration habitat, wildlife and human activities.

Balanced Ecology is an all-volunteer organization and all funds are used exclusively for the direct advancement of its mission.

== History ==
Balanced Ecology was founded in 2007 by Dr. Oranit (Orie) Gilad, a Conservation Ecologist. Dr. Gilad has spent over 15 years working on wildlife related projects around the world. Her work in western Texas with Mountain Lions and Desert Bighorn Sheep has put in focus the unique aspects of wildlife conservation in Texas, a state where 97–98% of all land is privately owned. Dr. Gilad believes that only through a collaborative effort between interested parties and by taking into consideration the needs of landowners as well as wildlife, progress can be made.

== Projects ==
=== Texas mountain lion conservation ===
Scientific studies conducted in Texas on mountain lions show that:

1. the cats are experiencing low survivorship mainly due to predator control and hunting practices,
2. a high percentage of female Mountain Lions is being killed, a fact indicating that the population is being harvested at an unsustainable level (more lions are being killed than survive)
3. due to killing practices, Mountain Lions exhibit a skewed age group (population mainly composed of younger individuals), an unhealthy situation for a wild (or any) animal population.

The Texas Mountain Lion Conservation Project is working to accomplish the following goals:

1. Educating the public regarding the importance of Mountain Lions, their ecology, and their status in Texas
2. working with private individuals, organizations, and other stakeholders interested in the conservation of Mountain Lions in Texas
3. achieving a solution where man and cat can coexist by identifying feasible solutions for such coexistence.

== Texas mountain lion population dynamics ==
The Texas Mountain Lion Population Dynamics project addresses the unique land situation in Texas and works to identify three types of areas. The first type, a source area, is one where mountain lions can be protected; the second area type is a stable area, which mountain lions can use as dispersal routes and their number is kept stable; and the third type of area is a sink area where mountain lions are allowed to be killed (areas such as sheep and goat ranching communities). This source/sink approach has been proven successful to maintaining a healthy and viable mountain lion population.

== Conserving nature's footprints ==
The Conserving Nature's Footprints outreach project teaches adults, teenagers, and kids how to enjoy the outdoors while minimizing their impact on the environment. The project incorporates classroom-type activities, hands-on experiences and field trips for adults, youth and children allowing individuals and teams to experience nature to its fullest while leaving no trace behind.

== See also ==
- Leave No Trace
