= Belles (disambiguation) =

Belles is an American country music singer.

Belles may also refer to:

- Belles, Dominica
- Belasica, a region of Macedonia sometimes referred to as Belles
- Steve Belles (born 1966), American football player
- The Belles, novel series
- Battle Creek Belles, part of the All-American Girls Professional Baseball League (1951–1952)
- Doncaster Belles, now Doncaster Rovers Belles L.F.C., an English semi-professional women's football club
- Memphis Belles, member of the Independent Women's Football League
- Muskegon Belles, part of the All-American Girls Professional Baseball League (1953)
- Racine Belles, a team of the All-American Girls Professional Baseball League (1943–1950)
