= Bell railway station, Melbourne =

Railway station in Melbourne, Australia

Bell
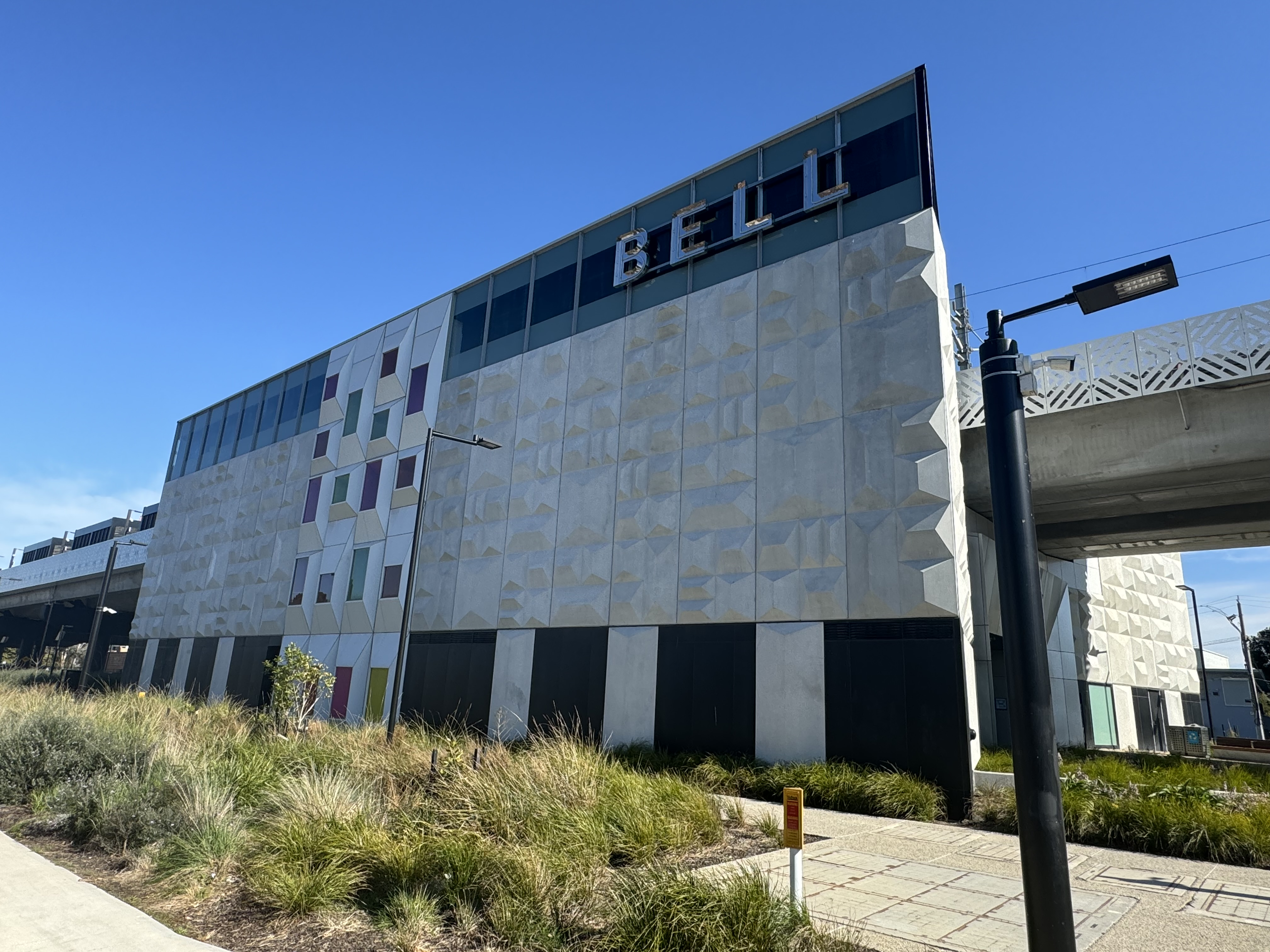
- Eastern facade, exterior and landscaping of Bell station, August 2024

General information
- Location: Garnet Street, Preston, Victoria 3072; City of Darebin; Australia
- Coordinates: 37°44′44″S 145°00′01″E
- System: PTV commuter rail station
- Owner: VicTrack
- Operator: Metro Trains
- Line: Mernda
- Distance: 11.70 kilometres from Southern Cross
- Platforms: 2 side
- Tracks: 2
- Connections: Bus

Construction
- Structure type: Elevated
- Parking: 75
- Cycle facilities: 6
- Accessible: Yes—step free access

Other information
- Status: Operational, premium station
- Station code: BEL
- Fare zone: Myki zone 1
- Website: Public Transport Victoria

History
- Opened: 8 October 1889; 137 years ago
- Rebuilt: 5 September 2022 (LXRP)
- Electrified: July 1921 (1500 V DC overhead)
- Former names: Preston-Bell Street (1889–1905)

Passengers
- 2005–2006: 307,030
- 2006–2007: 355,959 ▲15.93%
- 2007–2008: 393,114 ▲10.43%
- 2008–2009: 508,278 ▲29.29%
- 2009–2010: 549,773 ▲8.16%
- 2010–2011: 532,537 ▼3.13%
- 2011–2012: 523,225 ▼1.75%
- 2012–2013: Not measured
- 2013–2014: 433,148 ▼17.2%
- 2014–2015: 422,536 ▼2.45%
- 2015–2016: 462,990 ▲9.57%
- 2016–2017: 477,003 ▲3.02%
- 2017–2018: 541,111 ▲13.44%
- 2018–2019: 530,900 ▼1.88%
- 2019–2020: 444,100 ▼16.35%
- 2020–2021: 170,000 ▼61.7%
- 2021–2022: 132,450 ▼22.08%
- 2022–2023: 262,500 ▲98.19%
- 2023–2024: 385,100 ▲46.7%
- 2024–2025: 412,250 ▲7.05%

Services
Preceding station	Metro Trains	Following station
Thornbury towards Flinders Street	Mernda line	Preston towards Mernda
Track layout
Location

Bell station is a railway station operated by Metro Trains Melbourne on the Mernda line, part of the Melbourne rail network. It serves the north-eastern suburb of Preston in Melbourne, Victoria, Australia. Bell station opened on 8 October 1889, with the former ground level station closed and demolished in May 2022 and the current elevated station provided in September 2022 by the Level Crossing Removal Project. Bell station initially opened as "Preston-Bell Street" upon its opening in 1889, then it was given its current name of "Bell" on 1 August 1905.

Bell is an elevated premium station, consisting of two side platforms connected by staircases, lifts and a ground level concourse. Bell station fully complies with the Disability Discrimination Act 1992 and is accessible as there is a lift connecting to the ground level concourse and Bell station platforms on either side.

Bell station is owned by VicTrack, a state government agency, and operated by Metro Trains Melbourne. The station is currently served by the Mernda line, part of the Melbourne railway network. It is also served by four bus routes including Dysons bus routes 513, 514, 552 and 553. Bell station is approximately 9 km (5.6 mi) or around a 22 minute train ride to Flinders Street.

== Description ==
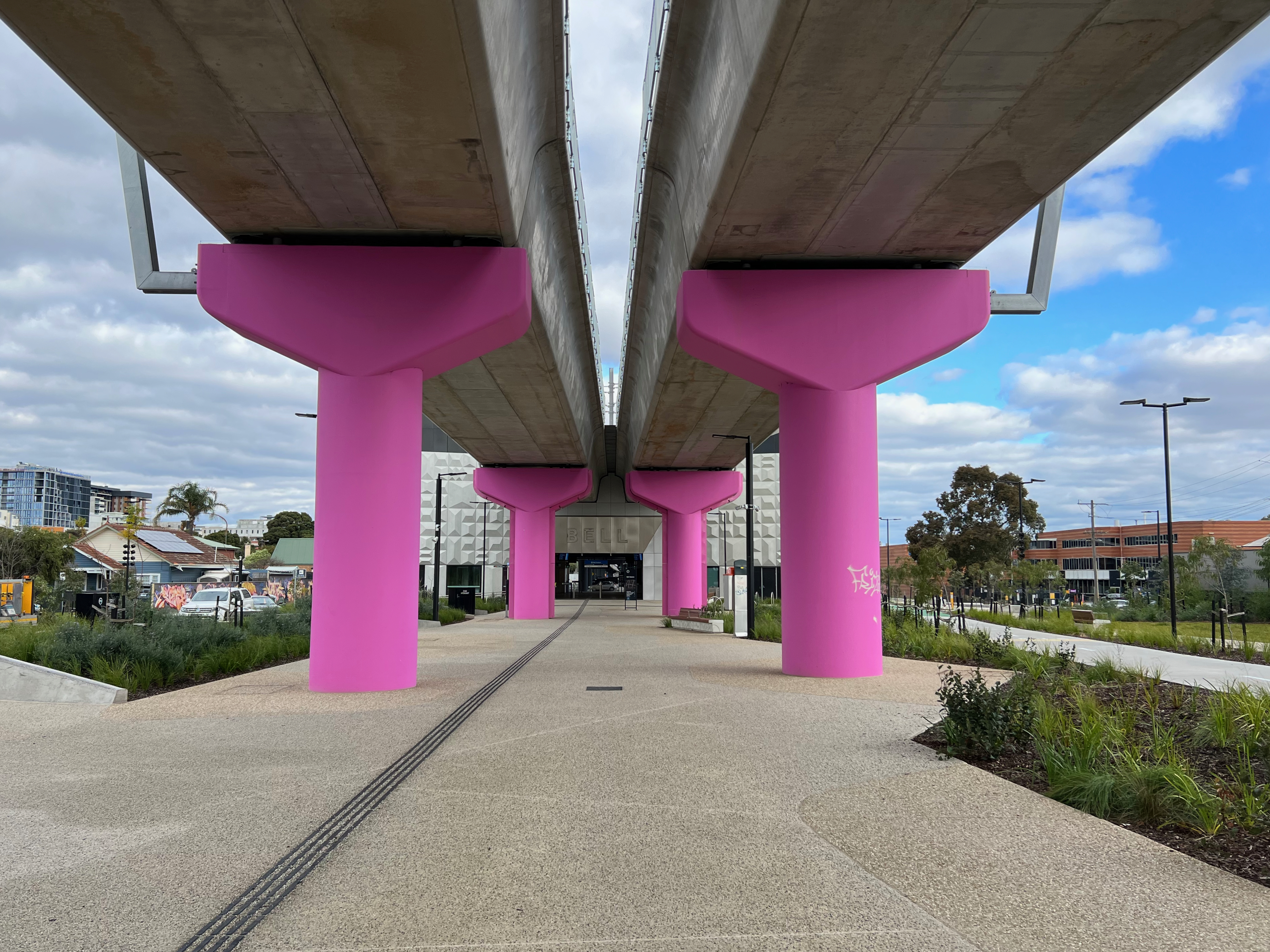
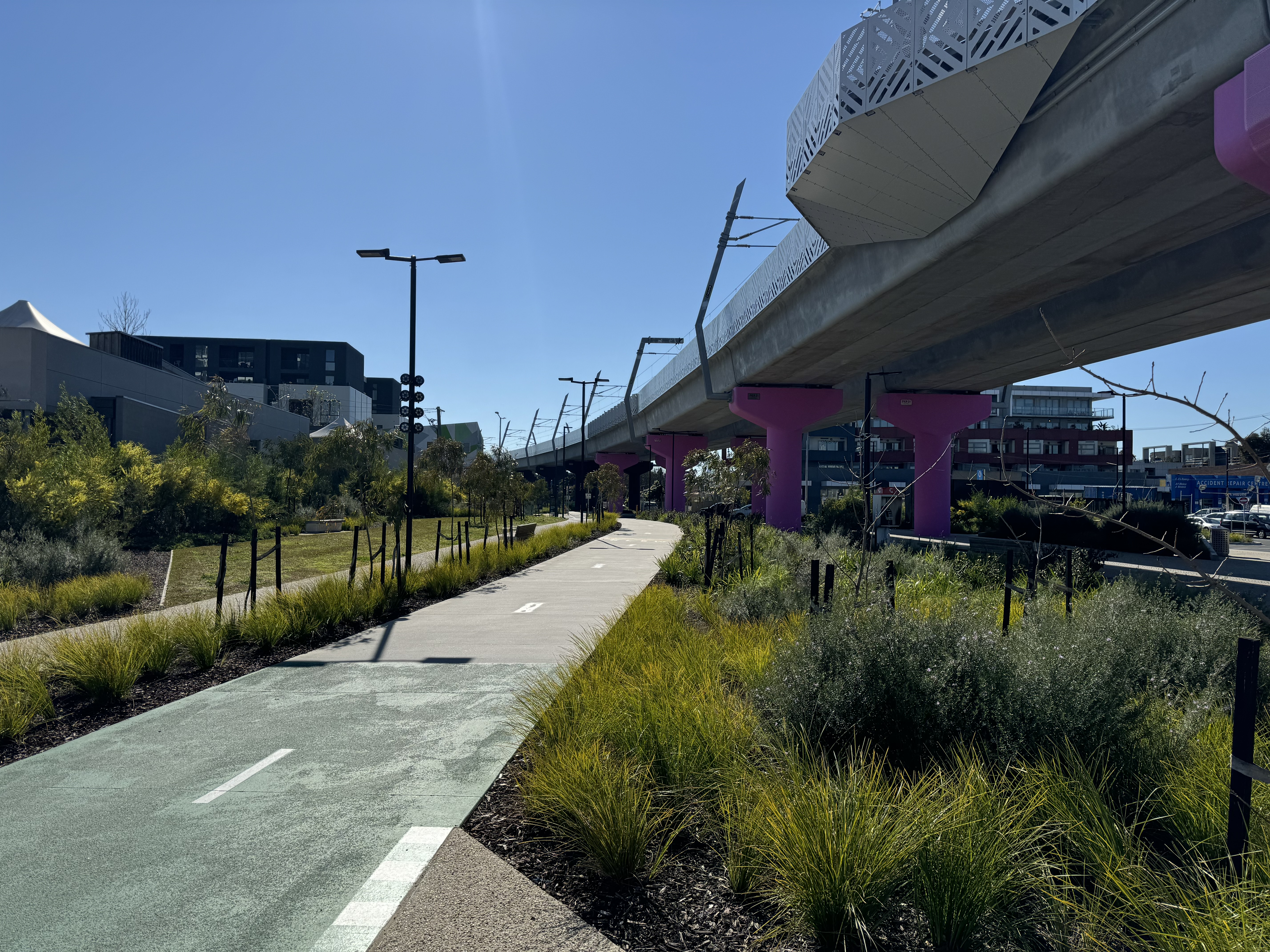
The elevated railway leading up to Bell station and the northern entrance (top), Bell station features a concourse and landscaping area.

Bell railway station is located in the north-eastern suburb of Preston in Melbourne, Victoria, Australia. It is owned by VicTrack, a state government agency, and operated by Metro Trains Melbourne. The adjacent stations are Thornbury station up towards Flinders Street and Preston station down towards Mernda. A train ride to Flinders Street takes around 22 minutes, covering 9 km (5.6 mi).

Bell station is fitted with shelters over the seating areas for protection against Melbourne's weather, as well as secure bike parking spots. In total, there are 77 car and 28 protected bike parking at Bell station. Moreover, the station features a ground level concourse, accessible by stairs and lifts up to the elevated platforms.

There is one main station building, opened in 2022, and made out of local roofscapes abstracted into three-dimensional patterns: mostly pink and purple glazing windows, post-war rooftops and references to the local art and culture scene. It contains a waiting room, a customer service, PSO office and a ground level concourse connected to the platforms.

Bell station is flanked on its eastern side by an amphitheatre.

== History ==
=== Pre level crossing removal ===
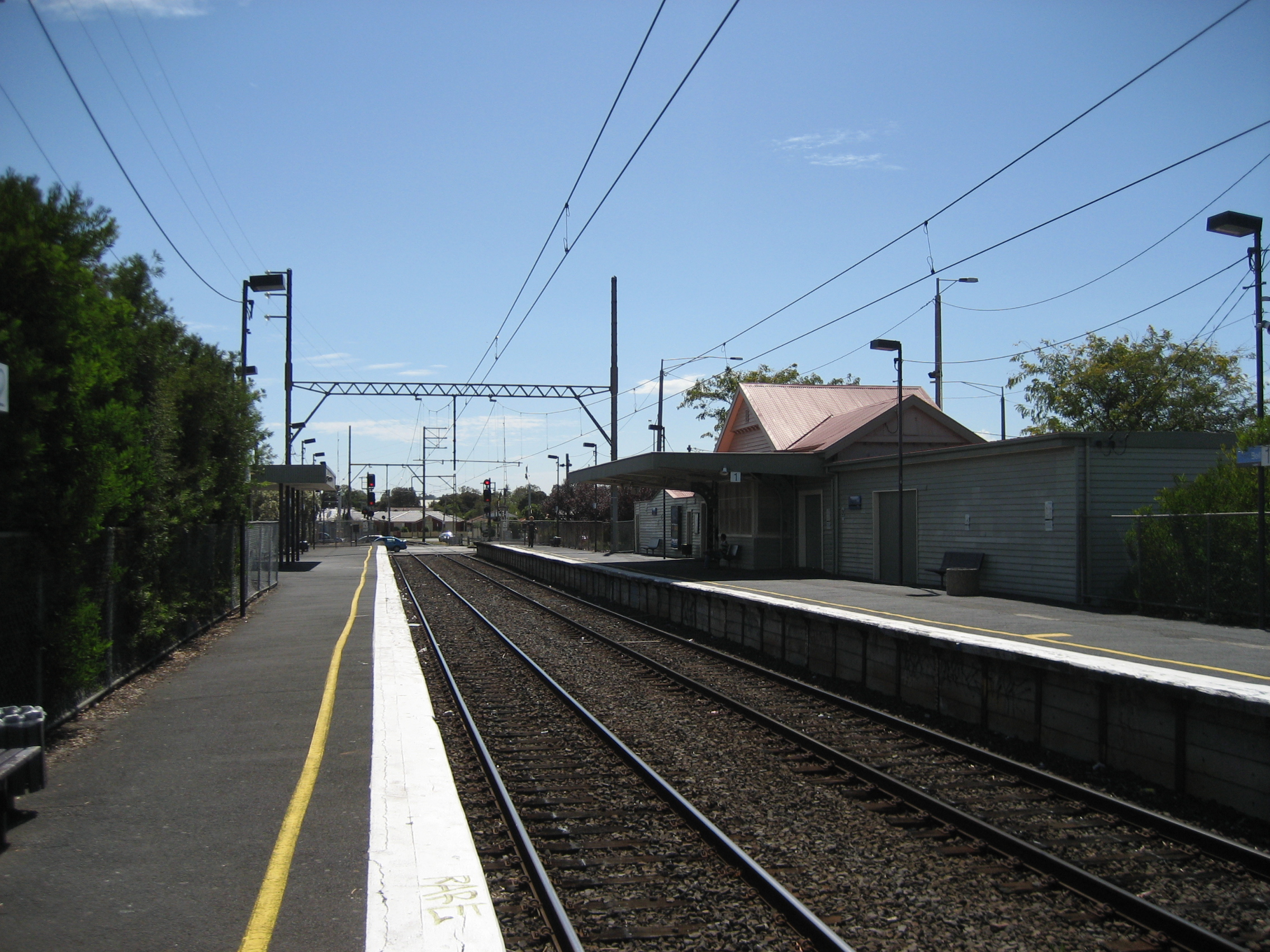
Former ground level station platforms, prior to the 2022 rebuilding project

Bell station was opened on 8 October 1889 and named after the nearby Bell Street, a major road located on the north side of Bell. The line passing through Bell was built to extend the Inner Circle line from North Fitzroy station to a new terminus at Reservoir station.

The original Bell station was situated next to the former Bell Street level crossing, which was upgraded with manually operated boom barriers in 1969, replacing the interlocking gates. A goods yard originally served Bell, however, it was removed in 1986, leaving only a siding area. On 17 April 1988, the double-line block signalling system between Bell and Reservoir was decommissioned and was replaced with automatic three position signalling. Additionally, in the same month, Bell was enhanced with pedestrian gates at the former Bell Street level crossing, in combination with the manually operated road boom barriers.

On 25 August 2008, Bell was upgraded to a premium station, featuring the addition of customer service facilities and the conversion of the former ground-level station building into a waiting room.

=== Level Crossing Removal Project ===
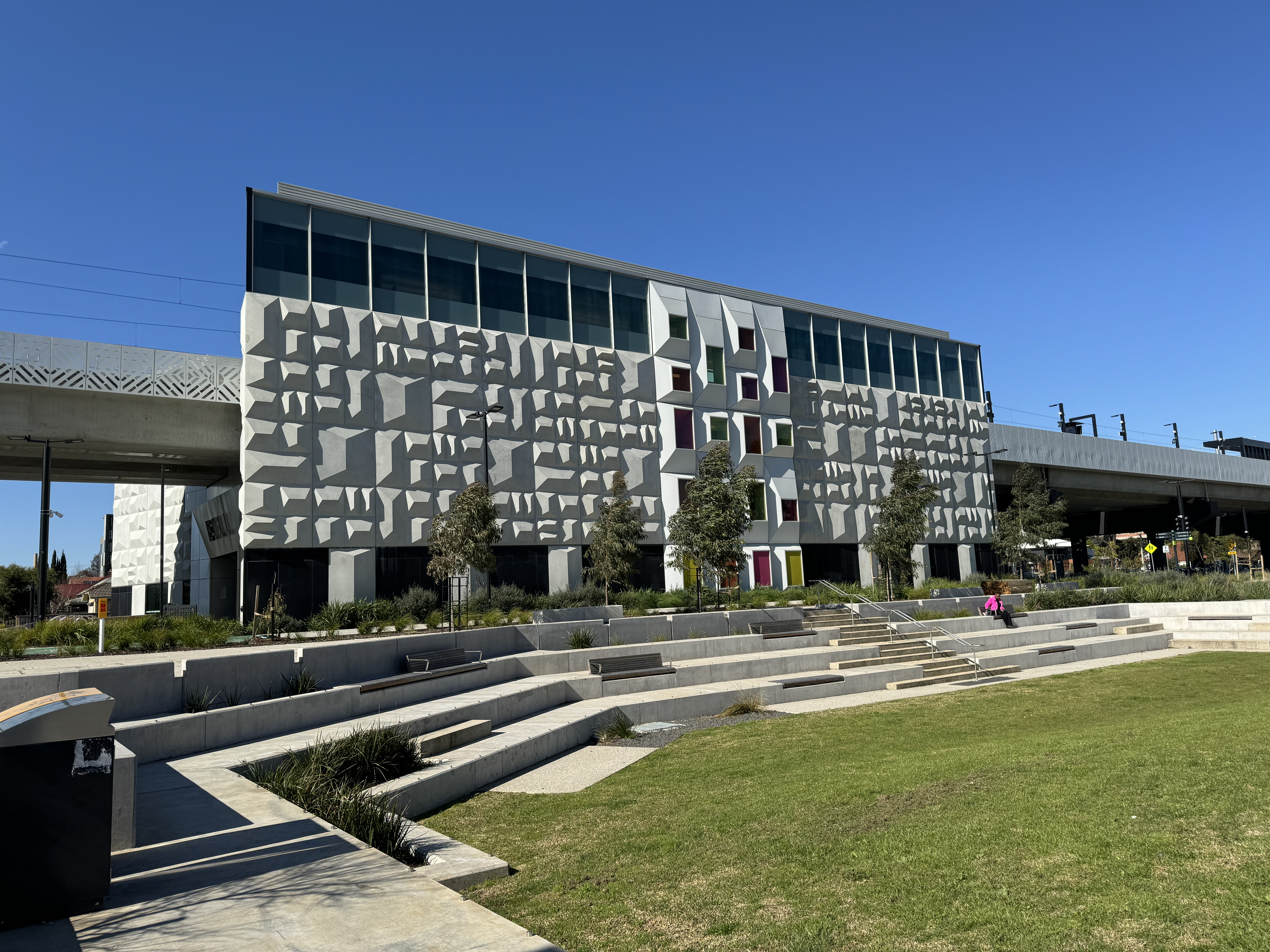
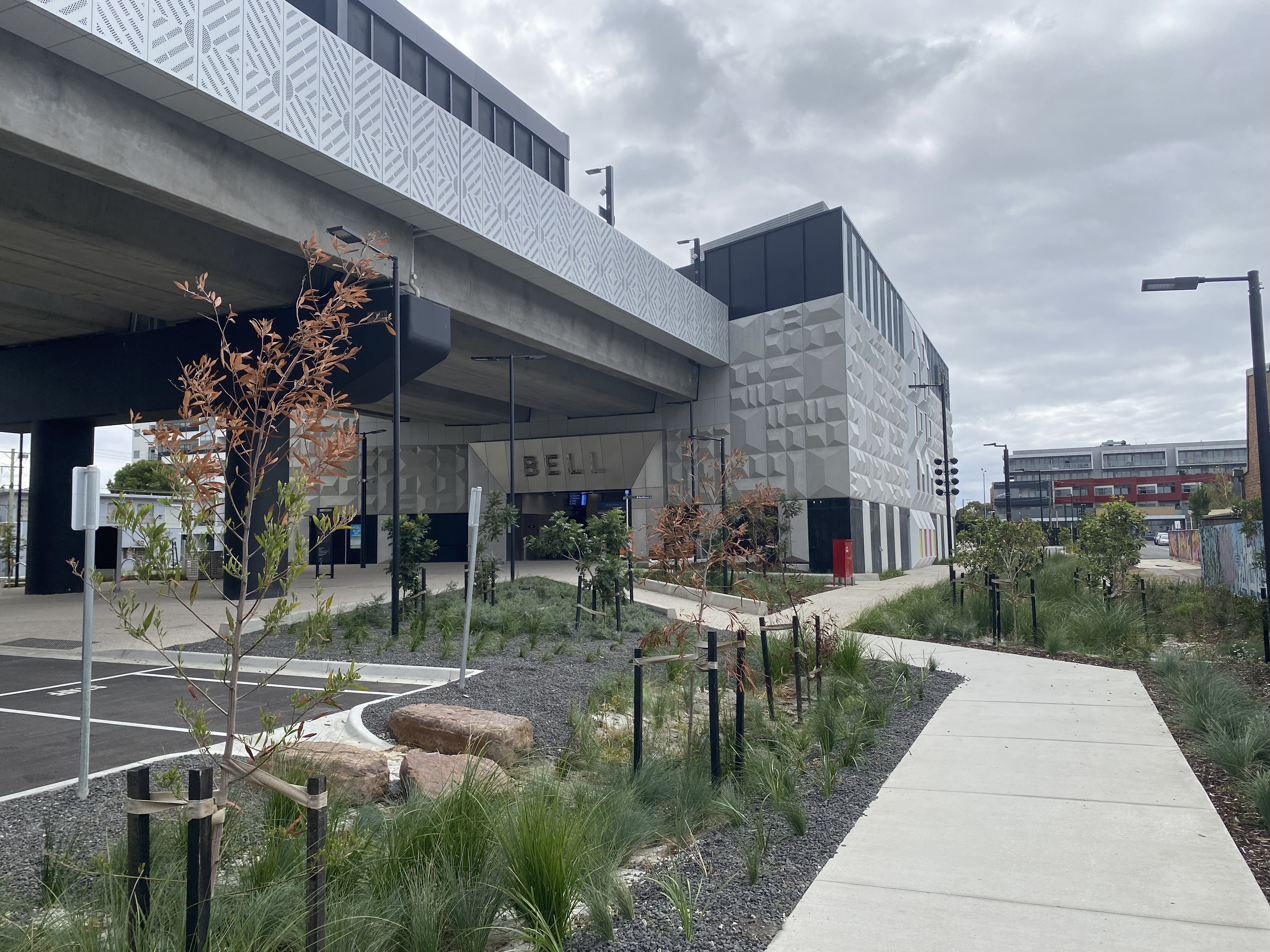
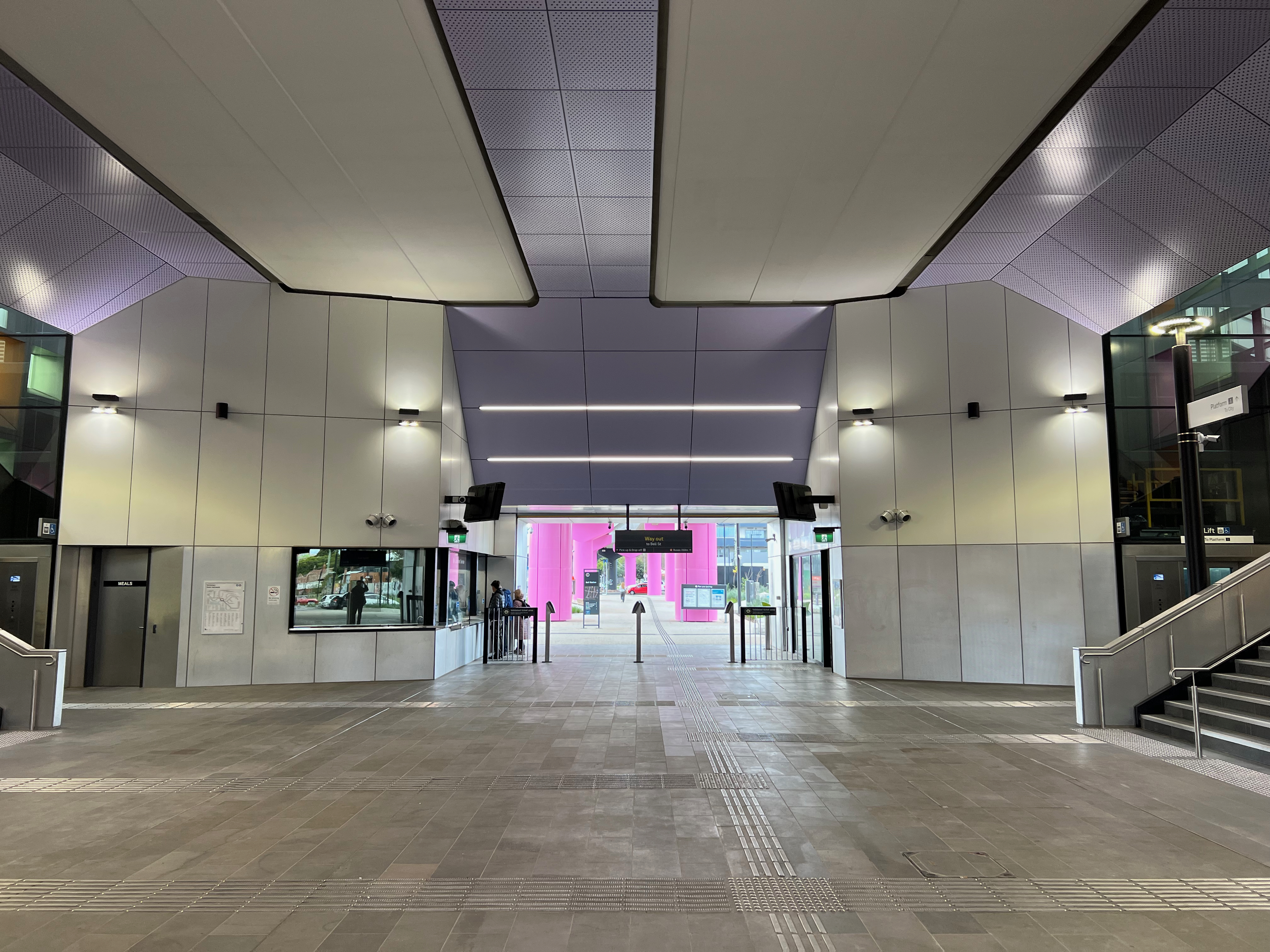
The western facade (top), Bell entrance, building and landscaping (middle), interior of Bell building leading out to the northern entrance (bottom)

In 2014, the first Andrews government announced a $2.4 billion program to remove 50 level crossings in Melbourne, including the Bell Street level crossing. The program was projected for completion by 2022. In January 2016, it was incorporated into the Level Crossing Removal Project program, but at the time, it had not been decided how the grade separation would be realised in regards to the Bell Street level crossing.

On 30 November 2018, the second Andrews government announced that the Level Crossing Removal Project would remove one level crossing at Oakover Road, along with 24 other level crossings across Melbourne as part of a $6.6 billion program. Instead, the level crossing was substituted with the elevated railway option.

The Bell railway station reconstruction began in February 2021 with piling works, installation of fencing around the construction site, and development of foundation for the temporary overhead wiring that would be used in the future 2 km (1.2 mi) elevated railway.

During the major construction period in 2021 and 2022, the Mernda line was closed a few times for maximum of 12 days to facilitate further piling and excavation works. The Mernda line was closed between 5 May to 12 May 2021, when the original Bell station building was demolished to make way for the new elevated railway, followed by the installation of an operational temporary station. Subsequently, the 114 piers were dug and the first part of the U-through elevated railway section was constructed, made up of two L-shaped beams. Between 17 May to 30 May 2022, the Mernda line was shut down for 12 days to remove the Oakover Road and Bell Street level crossings, get the first part of the elevated railway ready for trains to run on and demolish the old station platforms.

On 30 May 2022, the first part of the two kilometre elevated railway was opened, until 26 August 2022 only a single track was temporarily available because the Mernda line couldn't be closed for no longer than 12 days due to the requirement for trains to regularly access the Epping maintenance yard facility.

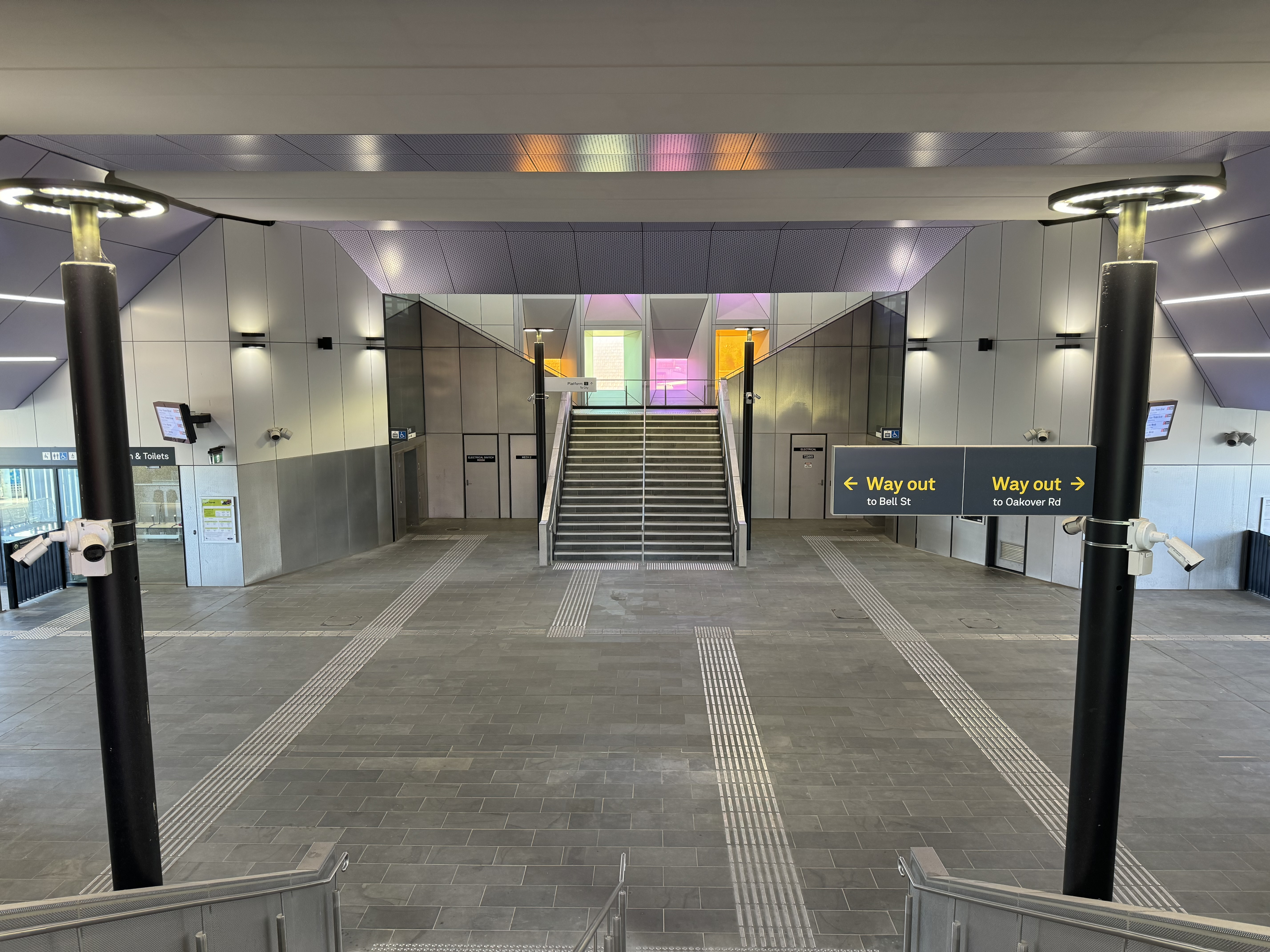
Interior of Bell building and concourse, showing the stairs leading to platforms and lighting, August 2024

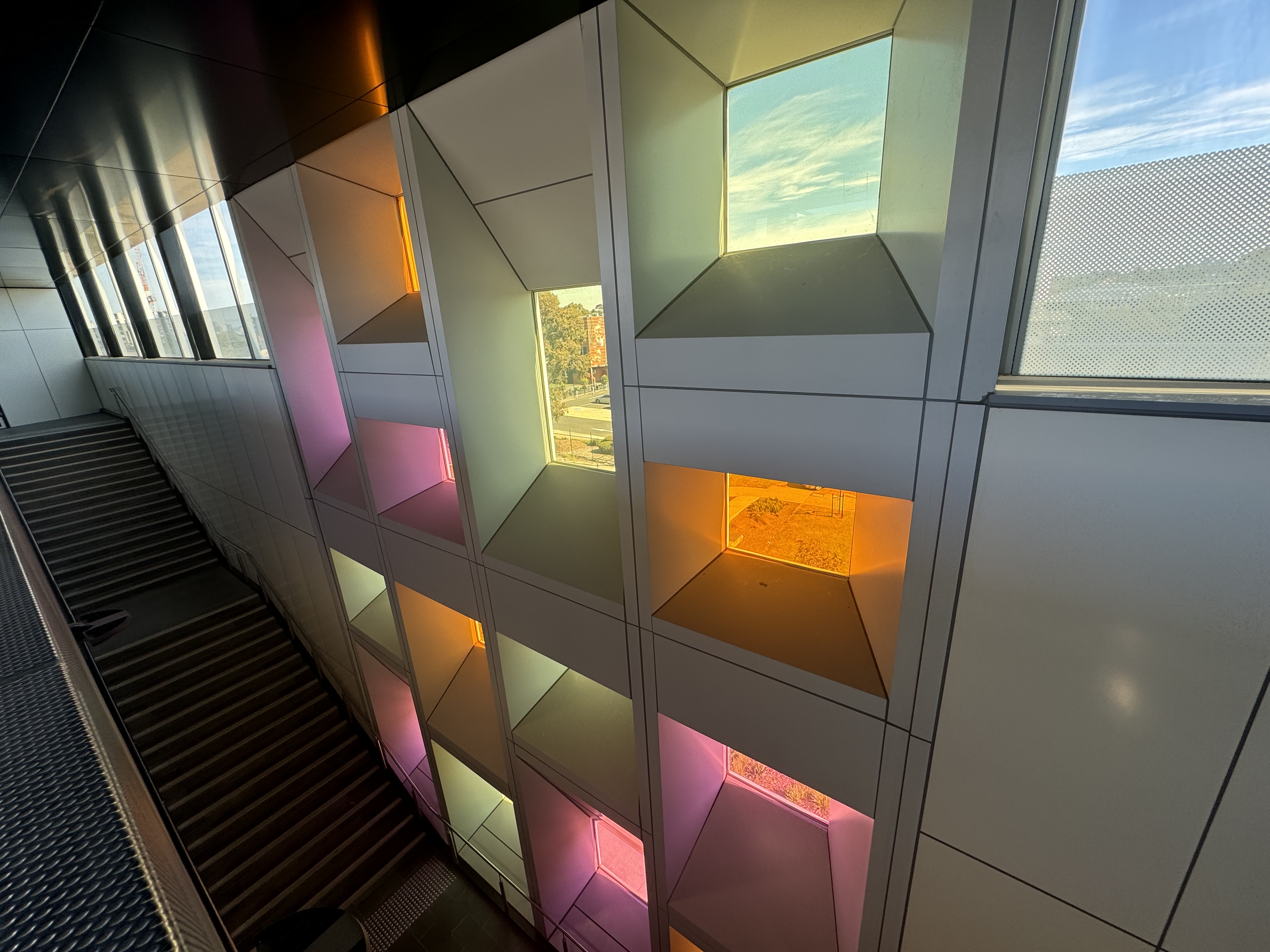
The colour glass stained window on Bell building on the 2022 LXRP rebuilt station, August 2024

Bell rebuilt by the LXRP in 2022 features colour glass stained windows on the western and eastern sides of the facade, Bell has lighting and staircases on both sides

On 5 September 2022 Bell station was opened to the public. The rebuilt Bell was moved 40 metres from the former ground level station site to increase the amount of community open space, forecourt and landscaping area. The new building was built with additional exits opened on the north side. Moreover, it got upgraded with water and energy efficient features such as solar panels, rainwater-reuse systems, LED lighting and environmentally sustainable materials to reduce greenhouse gas emissions. In 2023, the open space project was constructed near Oakover Road, located west and 280 metres from Bell station. It was named "Oakover Green" and equipped with a playground, landscaped gardens, seating areas and a yarning circle developed by Wurundjeri artists. In October 2024, Bell was recognised as one of the top six most beautiful stations in the world by Prix Versailles. It was the only Australian railway station recognised in that category.

== Services ==
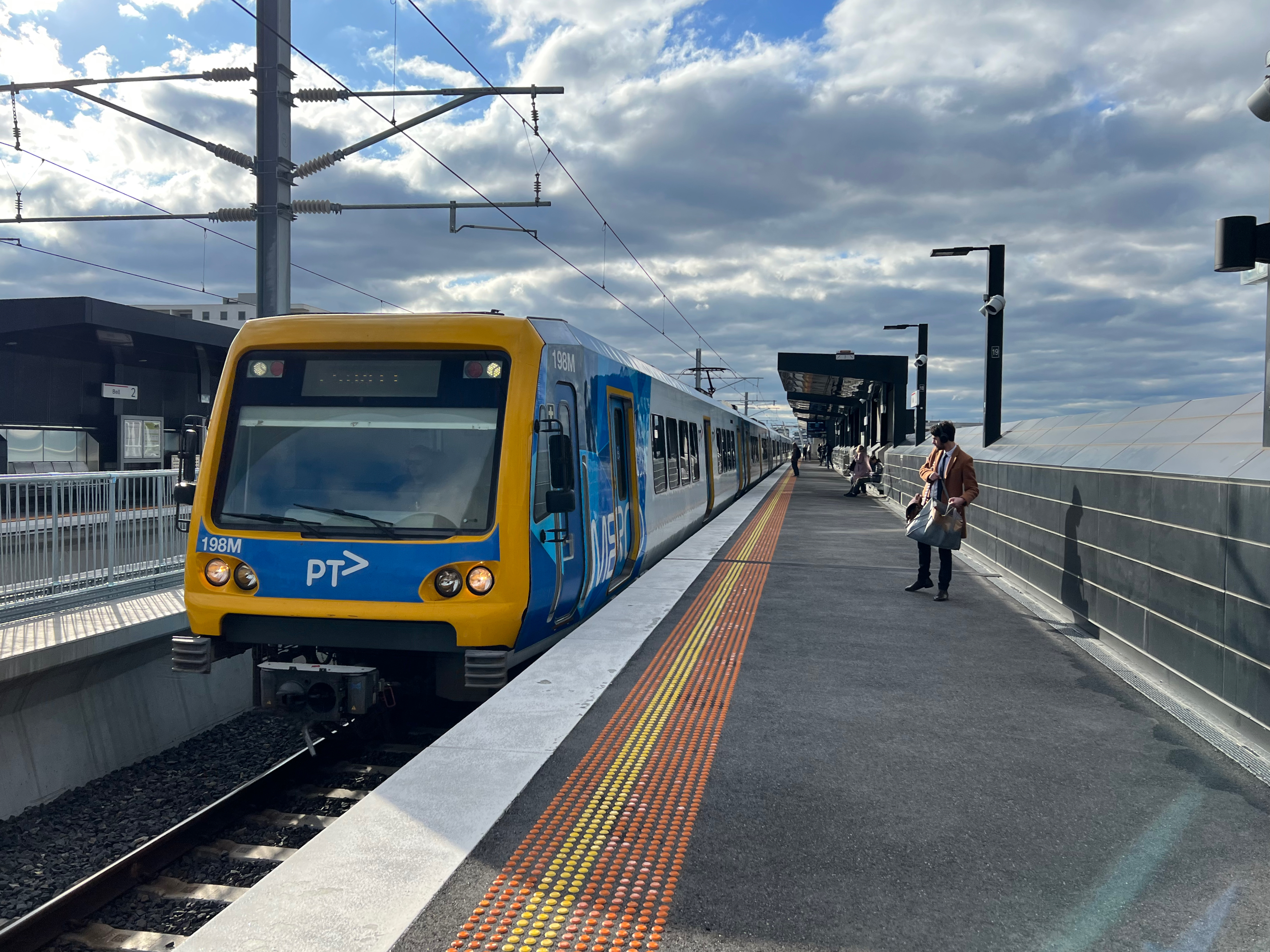
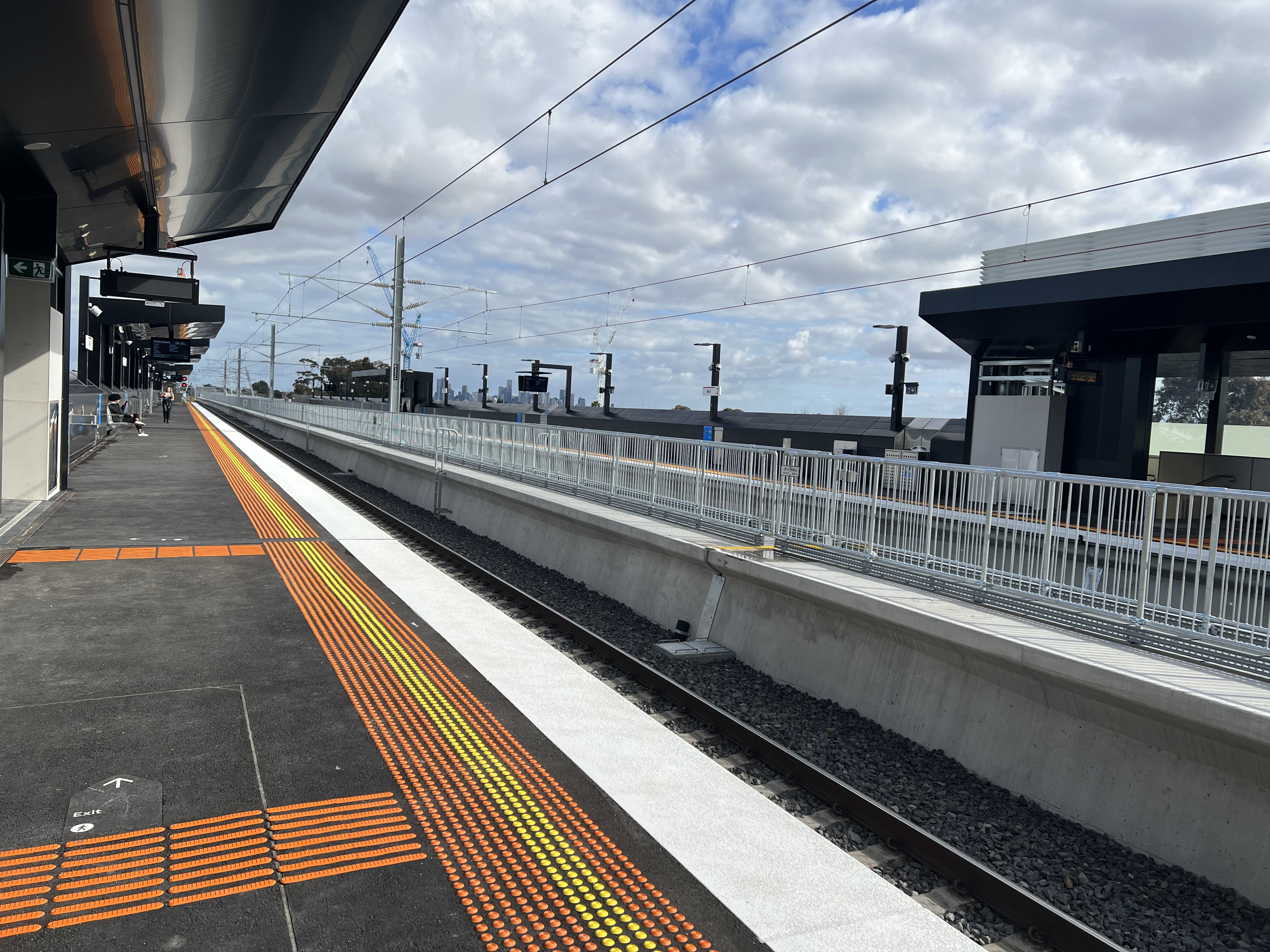
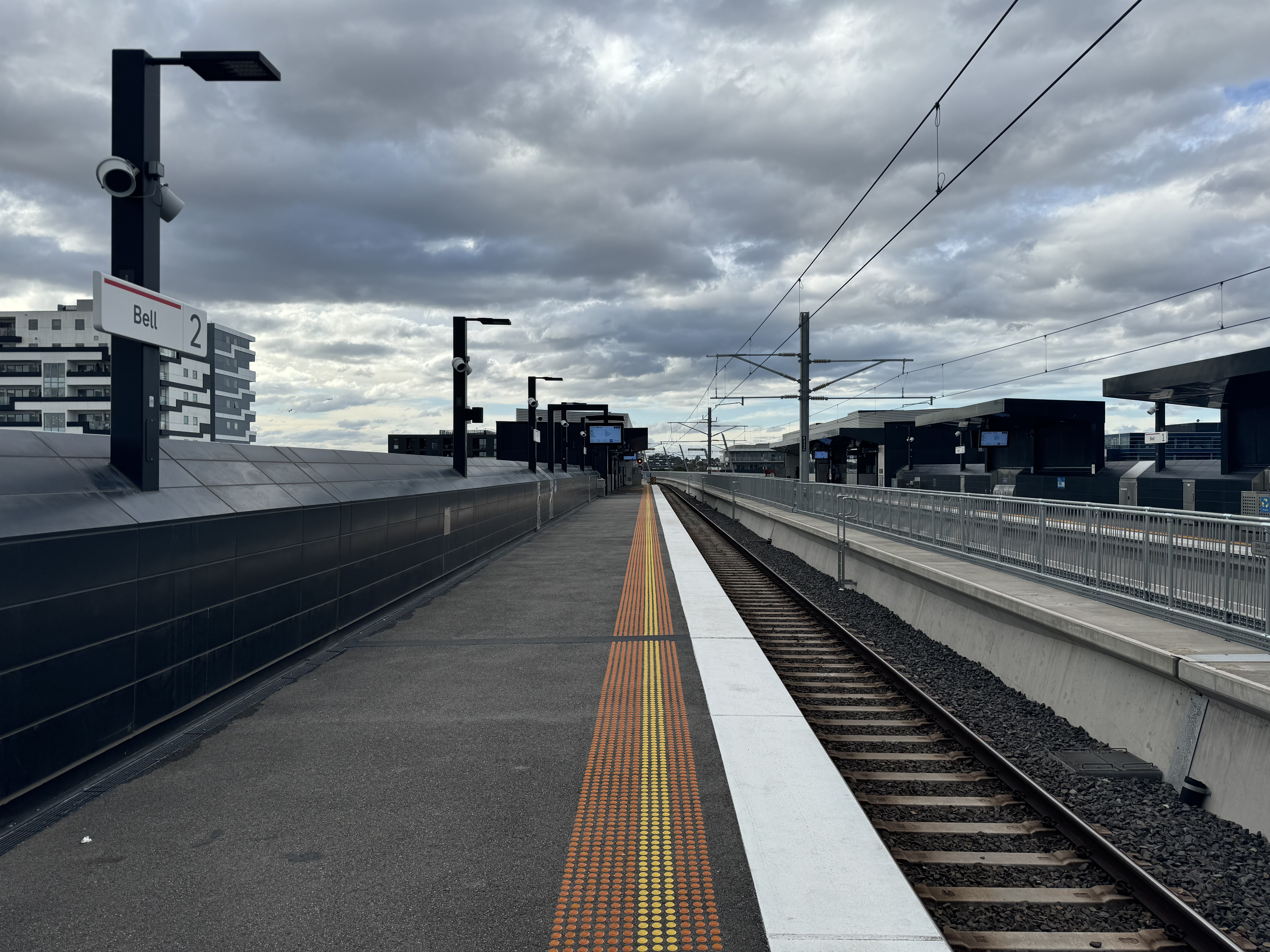
An X'Trapolis 100 train on a Flinders Street-bound service idle at Platform 1, July 2023 (top), Platform 1 at Bell looking southbound, September 2022 (middle), Platform 2 at Bell looking northbound, August 2024 (bottom)

Bell has two side platforms. Bell station is currently served by the Mernda line, part of the metropolitan railway network. The Mernda line runs from Mernda station, north-east of Melbourne, joining with the Hurstbridge line at Clifton Hill station before travelling through Flinders Street station and back through the City Loop in a clockwise direction.

Bell platform arrangement
Platform	Line	Destination	Service Type	Source
1	Mernda line	Flinders Street	All stations and limited express services	
2	Mernda line	Mernda	All stations	

== Transport links ==
Bell station has four bus route connections operated by Kinetic Melbourne and no tram connections. The route 513 and route 514 bus stop at the nearby Bell Street, north-west of Bell station: the route 513 bus operates from Eltham station to Glenroy station via Lower Plenty, while the route 514 bus operates from Eltham station to Glenroy station via Greensborough. The route 552 and 553 bus stop at the nearby High Street, east of Bell station: the route 552 operates from North East Reservoir to Northcote Plaza, while the route 553 bus operates from Preston to West Preston.

Bus connections:

- 513 : Eltham station – Glenroy station (via Lower Plenty)
- 514 : Eltham station – Glenroy station (via Greensborough)
- 552 : North East Reservoir – Northcote Plaza
- 553 : Preston – West Preston
