= Belle Air Europe =

Short-lived low-cost airline

IATA	ICAO	Call sign
L9	BAL	BELLEAIR EUROPE
- Founded: 2009
- Commenced operations: 2010
- Ceased operations: 26 November 2013
- Hubs: Pristina International Airport
- Fleet size: 2
- Destinations: 14
- Headquarters: Ancona, Italy
- Website: belleaireurope.eu

Belle Air Europe was a privately owned low-cost airline, founded in 2009 as a subsidiary of Albanian Belle Air, having its head office in Ancona, Italy. On 26 November 2013 Belle Air Europe ceased operations due to financial difficulties, just two days after the parent company Belle Air suspended operations as well.

== Destinations ==
Belle Air Europe operated international flights on scheduled service to several cities in Belgium, Germany, Italy, Sweden, Switzerland out of Pristina International Airport Adem Jashari and to a smaller extent out of Skopje "Alexander the Great" Airport.
