= Belle (surname) =

Belle is a surname. Notable people with the Belle surname:

- Alexis Simon Belle (1674–1734), French portrait artist
- Albert Belle (born 1966), American retired Major League Baseball player
- Anne Belle (1935–2003), documentary filmmaker
- Anomie Belle, American singer, musician, composer and social activist
- Camilla Belle (born 1986), American actress
- Cortez Belle (born 1983), English footballer
- David Belle (born 1973), French founder of Parkour, actor, film choreographer and stunt coordinator
- Dido Elizabeth Belle (1761–1804) born a slave and great-niece of Lord Mansfield
- Ekkehardt Belle (1954–2022), German television actor
- Erika Belle (born 1956), Dutch chess master
- Gerard van Belle (born 1968), American astronomer
- Henri Belle (born January 25, 1989), Cameroonian footballer
- Regina Belle (born 1963), American singer and songwriter
- Shawn Belle (born 1985), Canadian hockey player
- Sharon Belle (born 1993), Canadian actress
- Tia-Adana Belle (born 1996), Barbadian athlete

== See also ==
- Sweetie Belle, character in My Little Pony
