= Belle Baby Carriers =

Manufacturer and designer of front baby carriers

- Company type: Private
- Industry: Manufacturing, Design
- Founded: {start date and age|2006}} in Boulder, Colorado, U.S.
- Headquarters: Boulder, Colorado, U.S.
- Key people: Seth Murray (Founder/President); Juli Pearce (Director Sales & Marketing); Paige Mackey Murray (V.P. Operations)
- Products: Baby carriers
- Website: www.bellebabycarriers.com

Belle Baby Carriers is a privately held company that designs and manufactures a new form of front baby carrier. Belle was founded in 2006, and has quickly grown to sell its carriers in over 250 stores in the United States and in many other countries. Belle has received notable press from ABC News, the Boulder County Business Report and the Rocky Mountain News and was featured in the October 2008 edition of Entrepreneur Magazine. Its products have been reviewed in numerous independent national publications, such as People Magazine, Her Sports and Fitness, Earnshaws, Pregnancy, and Fit Pregnancy. Belle's carriers have been photographed on Julia Roberts, Jessica Alba, Angelina Jolie, and Nicole Kidman. The company is based in Boulder, Colorado and is a division of Inventista, Inc., a Colorado design and engineering firm. Belle is known for producing a baby carrier that provides direct contact between the parent and the child. Belle has patents pending and is trademarked in the United States and internationally. Belle manufactures its products in the United States and consolidates its manufacturing and distribution facilities in the Colorado Front Range area.

== Founders ==
Belle was founded in 2006 by Boulder resident Seth Murray. Prior to the new venture, Murray, a mechanical engineer, worked with industrial designer Mark LeBeau of Logan Utah, to develop and test more than 30 climbing gear products for Trango, a climbing equipment company based in Louisville, Colorado.

LeBeau and Murray named the company after their daughters, named Isabelle and Isabel respectively. They designed the product and then tested a prototype for over a year with other parents.

== Products ==
Belle Baby Carriers products include:

- Black Organic Cotton and Hemp Baby Carrier
- Moss Organic Cotton and Hemp Baby Carrier
- Sand Organic Cotton and Hemp Baby Carrier
- Denim Organic Cotton and Hemp Baby Carrier
- Earth Organic Cotton and Hemp Baby Carrier
- Black Micro-Suede and Kashan Baby Carrier
- Sky Micro-Suede and Kashan Baby Carrier
- Cappuccino Micro-Suede and Kashan Baby Carrier
- Cherry Deco Micro-Suede, Woven, and Kashan Baby Carrier
- Cheetah Micro-Suede, Faux Fur and Kashan Baby Carrier
- Orange Blossom, Micro-Suede, embroidered and Kashan Baby Carrier
