= Lebel =

Lebel (also Le Bel or LeBel) is a surname, and may refer to:

== Arts and entertainment ==
- Firmin Lebel (died 1573), French composer
- Jean-Jacques Lebel (born 1936), French painter and performance art organizer
- Robert Lebel (art critic) (1901–1986), French art critic and writer, father of Jean-Jacques

== Politics ==
- Denis Lebel (born 1954), Canadian politician
- Ghislain Lebel (born 1946), Canadian politician
- Harold LeBel (born 1962), Canadian politician

== Sport ==
- Matthis Lebel (born 1999), French rugby player
- Robert Lebel (ice hockey) (1905–1999), Canadian ice hockey administrator and politician

== Other ==
- Dominique Guillaume Lebel (1696–1768), Louis XV's valet-de-chambres and pimp
- Jean Lebel (c. 1290–1370), Belgian chronicler
- Joseph Achille Le Bel (1847–1930), French chemist
- Louis LeBel (1939–2023), Canadian judge
- Maurice Lebel (1909–2006), Canadian academic
- Nicolas Lebel (1838–1891), French military officer and member of the commission that supervised the development of the Lebel Model 1886 rifle
- Robert Lebel (bishop) (1924–2015), Canadian Catholic bishop

== See also ==
- Lebel (disambiguation)
