= Isabel Whelan =

American indie pop singer and songwriter

Isabel Whelan, also known as Bel (stylized BEL), is a Los Angeles-based indie pop singer and songwriter who signed with Nettwerk Music Group in 2025.

Whelan, who was born in Clovis, California, began performing as a solo artist in 2017 while attending college at UCLA. In 2020, she released her debut single, "Silver Line", which received critical acclaim.
