= Annabel Linquist =

American artist

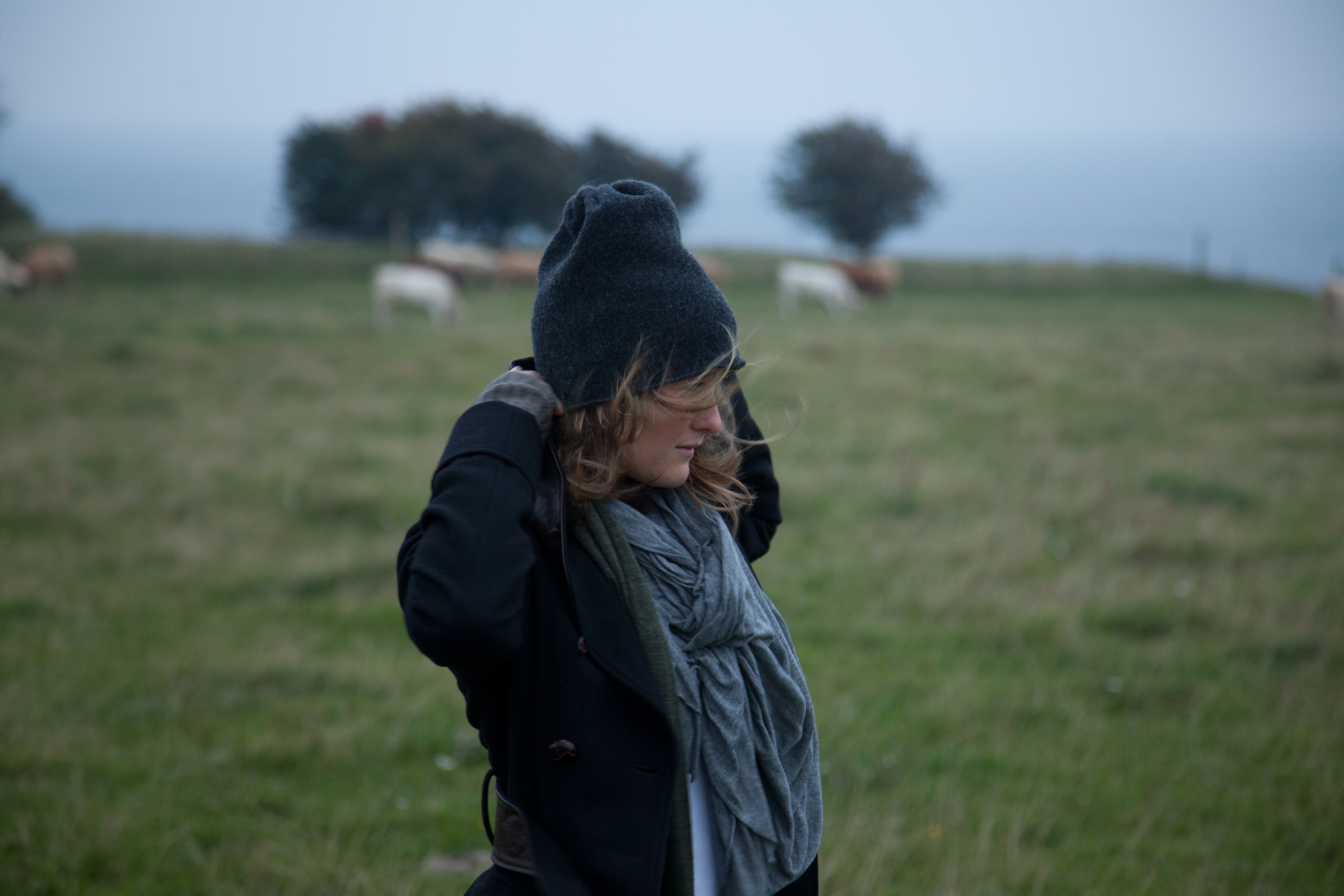
Annabel Linquist in a Swedish meadow. Photo by Daniel Karlsson.

Annabel Linquist, also known as Bel or Bels, is an American artist, entrepreneur, musician, and producer.

Annabel specializes in creating custom paintings or "Charms" that "neurologically rewire" the brains of her collectors. According to Linquist, her work is "coded to repel ghosts" and is based on research in epigenetics, neuroplasticity, and the occult. Annabel's privately commissioned "psychic paintings" and custom-made love songs are widely praised and known to be well loved in celebrity circles.

Linquist is the creator of Book Report, a New York Times featured startup that became popular in 2011 by circulating a reincarnated series of Summer Guides that started as an underground Vanity Fair project. She is also known for her work with Sony Ericsson's global promotional campaign for the Xperia Arc, which won a Webby Award in the Integrated Mobile Experience category in London and New York.

Annabel owns a Parisian record label, Genealogy of Jeremiah, and has released 3 songs with her band, Holy Magic in collaboration with Imogen Heap's Mi.Mu gloves project. Linquist plans to release her debut album in 2026 from her Cotswolds, UK outpost as Bels.

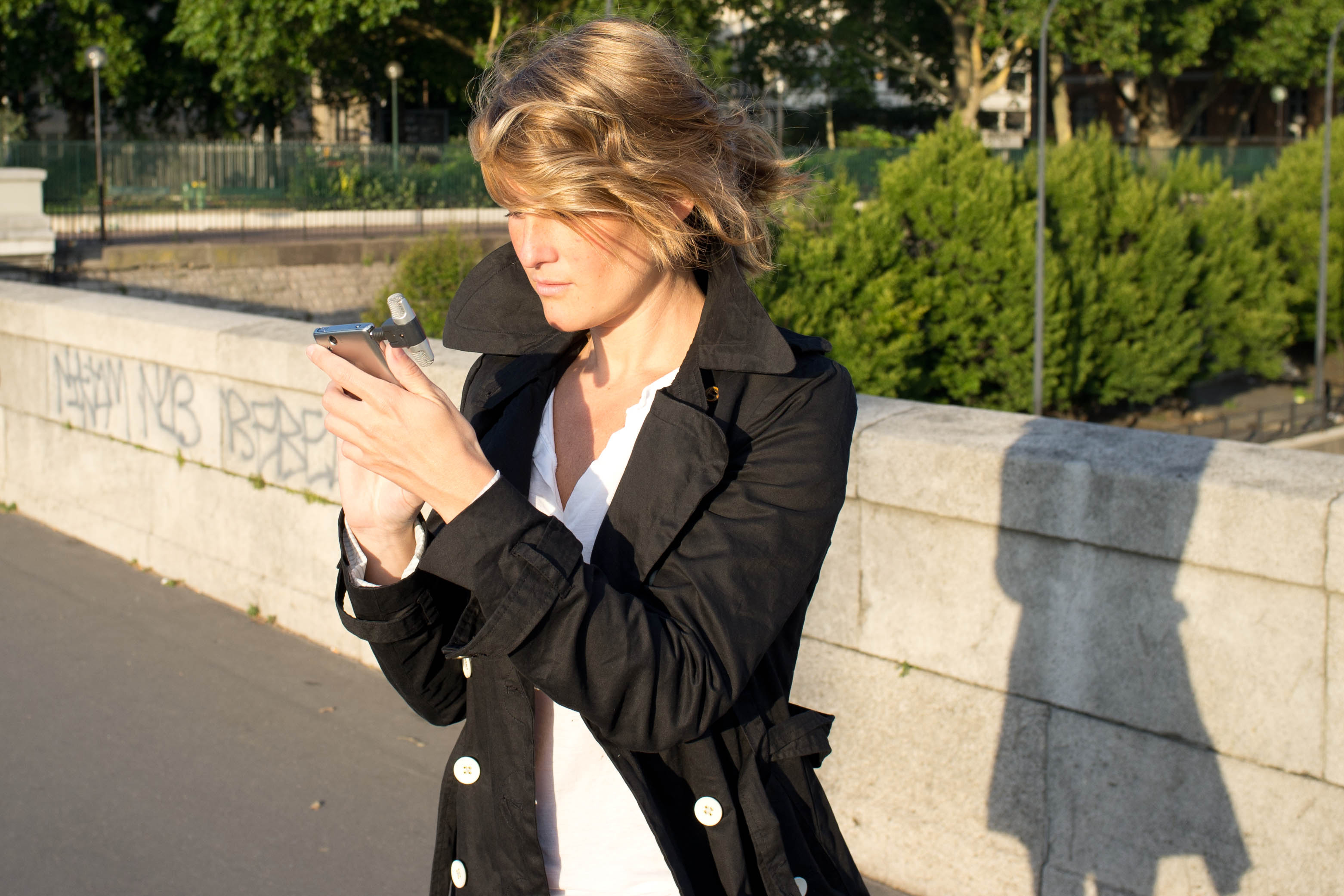
Annabel Linquist creating a song for Sony Ericsson in Paris. Photo by Daniel Karlsson.

Linquist's current painting project is a "Desert Popup" in Marfa, Texas called, #charmogram in partnership with Artsy.
