= 1907 VFL grand final =

Grand final of the 1907 Victorian Football League season

Carlton	South Melbourne
6.14 (50)	6.9 (45)
	1	2	3	4
CAR	1.4 (10)	4.6 (30)	6.10 (46)	6.14 (50)
SM	1.3 (9)	3.5 (23)	4.7 (31)	6.9 (45)
- Date: 21 September 1907
- Stadium: Melbourne Cricket Ground
- Attendance: 45,477
- Umpires: Lardie Tulloch

The 1907 VFL grand final, originally known as the 1907 VFL final, was an Australian rules football game contested between the Carlton Football Club and South Melbourne Football Club, held at the Melbourne Cricket Ground in Melbourne on 21 September 1907. It was the 10th grand final of the Victorian Football League, and determined the premiers for the 1907 VFL season.

The match, attended by 45,477 spectators, was won by reigning premiers Carlton by a margin of five points, marking that club's second VFL premiership victory and second in succession.

== Background ==
Carlton and South Melbourne occupied the top two places on the ladder after the home-and-away season was complete. Carlton was minor premier with a 14–3 record, and South Melbourne was second with 11–6. Both teams recorded comfortable victories in their semi-finals, South Melbourne 12.10 (82) defeating fourth-placed Collingwood 6.12 (48) on 7 September, and Carlton 13.13 (91) defeating third-placed St Kilda 4.11 (35) on 14 September.

Under the amended Argus system of finals, this match was known as the final. If Carlton won the match, then as minor premier it would win the premiership; if South Melbourne won, Carlton would have had the right to a rematch for the premiership on the following weekend. Since Carlton ultimately won the game, this was the last match of the year and is retrospectively considered a grand final.

== Match summary ==
The final was played at the Melbourne Cricket Ground. It was a windy day, but the effect of the wind at ground level was minimal. The surface, which had been very hard during the previous semi-final, was watered on the Friday before the match. A schoolboys match between the Fort Street school of Sydney and a composite team of local schoolboys was played as curtain-raiser. The crowd was 45,477, breaking the record set in the 1906 VFL grand final as the highest VFL attendance.

=== First quarter ===
Carlton won the coin toss and kicked with the slight breeze, but South Melbourne attacked early and had the better of play overall. With misses to Len Mortimer, Charlie Ricketts and Hughie Callan, South Melbourne scored the first three behinds. Carlton then attacked, and following behinds to Fred Jinks and Harvey Kelly, Jinks marked and kicked the first goal of the game. South Melbourne attacked next, and Dick Casey scored their first goal from a sequence of passes. There were no further goals for the quarter.

The margin was one point at quarter time, 1.4 (10) leading 1.3 (9), although contemporary sources disagree on which team was leading; modern sources agree that Carlton led. Both clubs opened the game in rough style, and umpire Lardie Tulloch paid a high volume of early free kicks to keep control, after which play settled down.

=== Second quarter ===
Jim Flynn went into the ruck for Carlton in the second quarter, to great effect as Carlton had the better of the quarter. Both clubs scored behinds from easy chances early in the second quarter – Callan for South Melbourne and Dick Harris for Carlton – before Mortimer kicked the opening goal of the quarter from a free kick for South Melbourne. Soon after, Carlton came close to goal when George Topping's kick hit the post for a behind. Carlton then kicked two goals in quick succession to regain the lead: first a goal to Alex Lang, who toe-poked the ball through after a broken marking contest in the goal square fell to his favour, and then a goal to Topping immediately from the ensuing centre bounce. South Melbourne drew level at 3.5 (23) apiece when Mortimer kicked his second goal from general play on a wide angle, but Carlton attacked again and scored a goal after a mark in front to Topping. Another difficult chance by Kelly from a wide angle set shot was just missed, but Carlton with the better of the quarter led by seven points at half time, Carlton 4.6 (30) vs South Melbourne 3.5 (23).

=== Third quarter ===
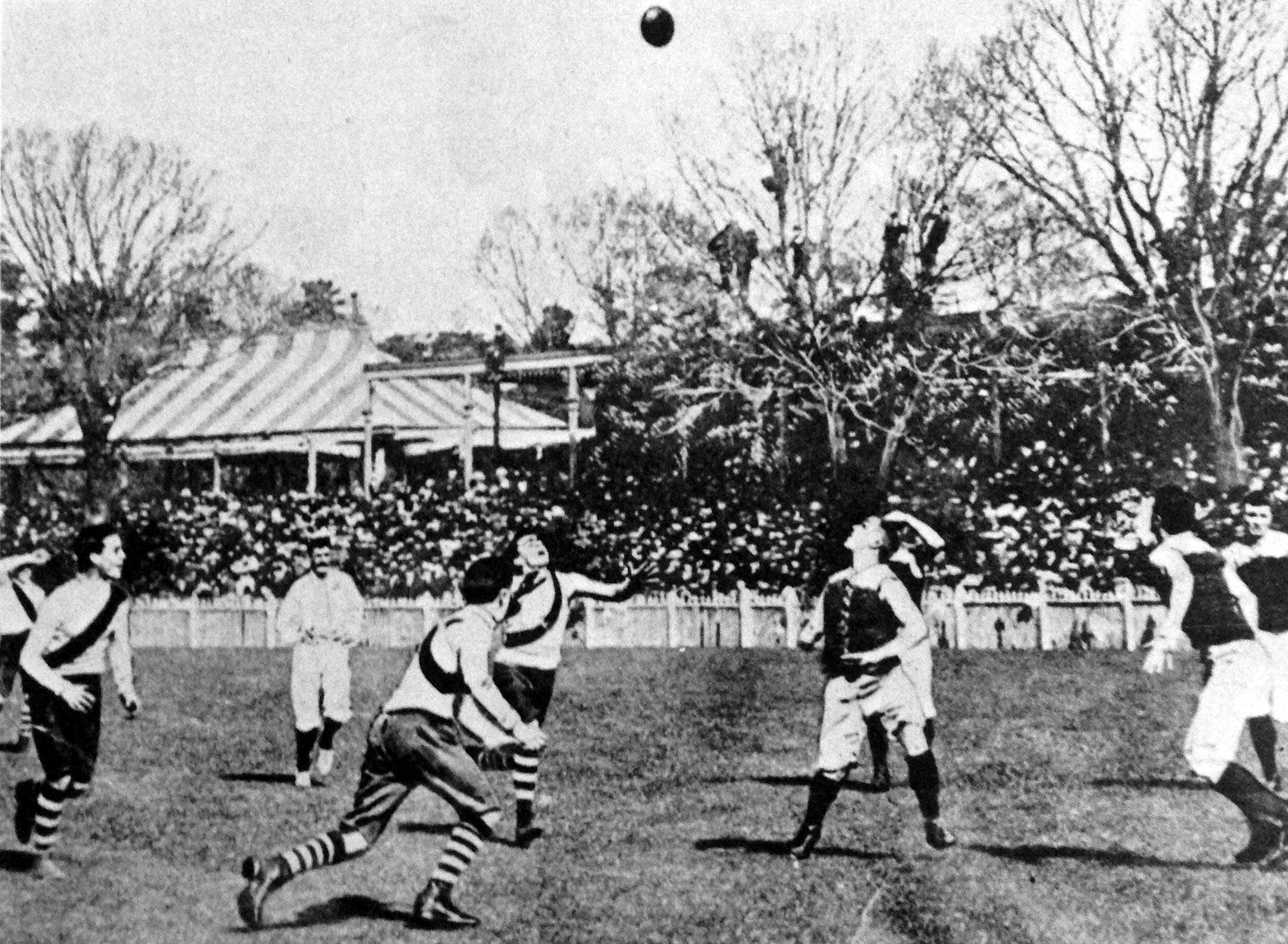
Scene of the match

After an unusually long half time break lasting 27 minutes, the third quarter was the game's most intense, and once again opened with several chances missed, South Melbourne attacking first but Carlton attacking more often – and the Blues securing three behinds to South Melbourne's two over the period. South Melbourne scored the first goal of the quarter, Bill Strang converting from a close-range ground contest in the goal square. Carlton responded immediately with two goals in the next two minutes: the first by Kelly, who converted a wide angled place kick; and the second by Topping, who marked a pass from Kelly and converted.

When the third quarter ended, Carlton 6.10 (46) held a fifteen point lead over South Melbourne 4.7 (31).

=== Final quarter ===
As the final quarter began and progressed, fatigue set in, particularly for Carlton, allowing South Melbourne's smaller players to take control of play, while Carlton focussed on boundary line play and tried to waste as much time as Tulloch would allow them to. South Melbourne attacked, and Strang kicked two goals in quick succession to reduce the margin to three points. Alex Kerr then reduced the margin to two points, slipping as he took his kick.

Carlton sustained the next period of attack, missing five chances to extend the margin beyond a goal. Kelly won a free kick which narrowly missed the goals; Kelly intercepted the ensuing kick off and passed to Topping, who snapped another behind. Kelly had another chance on the run, which he missed. Topping had a wide angle shot which failed to score. Finally, Martin Gotz won a free kick, which hit the post. With four behinds in this period, Carlton's lead was now out to six points.

South Melbourne then had the final chances to attack. They appeared to have created a chance to level the scores, Callan getting into 30 yards of space near the goals; but he had been fouled by his opponent earlier in the play and was called back to take his free kick over the mark, resulting in no score. Their next chance, a long kick by Alex Kerr, was marked on the goal line by a Carlton defender (identified as either Doug Gillespie or Les Beck). Their final chance was a hurried kick by Mortimer, which scored a behind. Carlton rebounded the ensuing kick-off to Frank Caine, and the bell rang as he was lining up for a set shot. With both teams missing late chances, Carlton held on to win 6.14 (50) to 6.9 (45).

=== Overall ===
Overall, the game was a clash between two different styles of play: the taller and heavier Carlton team, which played a strong rushing game with its rucks and keys, and the smaller and speedier South Melbourne which played a shorter passing game. Game conditions favoured Carlton, but fatigue in the final quarter almost allowed South Melbourne to come back to win. South Melbourne captain Bill Dolphin praised his team, while noting that the young and inexperienced forwardline had played flustered in the final ten minutes when it missed several chances to win.

There was no consensus among sportswriters regarding a best player on the ground, with those singled out for praise being: Carlton rucks 'Mallee' Johnson and Jim Flynn; Carlton rover Charlie Hammond; South Melbourne centre half-back Phonse Wood; South Melbourne ruckman Callan; and South Melbourne rover Charlie Ricketts.

The match was considered the most exciting premiership-deciding final up to that point in the league's history. It was the second of three consecutive premierships won by Carlton between 1906 and 1908.

== Scorecard ==
1907 VFL Final
Saturday, 21 September	Carlton	def.	South Melbourne	Melbourne Cricket Ground (crowd: 45,477)
1.4 (10); 4.6 (30); 6.10 (46); 6.14 (50)	Q1; Q2; Q3; Final	1.3 (9); 3.5 (23); 4.7 (31); 6.9 (45)	Umpires: Lardie Tulloch
Topping 3, Jinks, Kelly, Lang	Goals	Strang 3, Mortimer 2, Casey
Johnson, Flynn, Hammond, Gillespie, Beck	Best	Wood, Callan, Ricketts, Atkins

== Teams ==
Carlton	S. Melbourne

Carlton
B:	Norm Clark	Doug Gillespie	Les Beck
HB:	Martin Gotz	Jim Flynn (c)	Billy Payne
C:	George Bruce	Alby Ingleman	Ted Kennedy
HF:	Fred Jinks	Harvey Kelly	Frank Caine
F:	Mick Grace	George Topping	Dick Harris
Foll:	George Johnson	Charlie Hammond	Alex Lang
Coach:	Jack Worrall		

South Melbourne
B:	Harry Lampe	Bill Dolphin (c)	Harry Wilson
HB:	Phonse Wood	Bert Atkins	George Anderson
C:	Billy Moxham	Ted Wade	Horrie Drane
HF:	Dick Casey	Bill Strang	Bill Kerr
F:	Hughie Callan	Len Mortimer	Alex Kerr
Foll:	Vic Belcher	Jim Cameron	Charlie Ricketts

- Umpire – Lardie Tulloch

Each club made forced changes to its semi-final team due to injury. Rod McGregor was out of the Carlton team with a broken nose suffered in the semi-final and Alby Ingleman took his place; and George Curran and Bill Goddard were out of the South Melbourne team with sprained ankles, replaced by Bill Kerr and Harry Wilson.

Both teams were also missing two top players through suspensions which were earned when the clubs had most recently met on 17 August: Carlton was missing captain Fred Elliott and key position player Jim Marchbank, and South Melbourne missing followers Bert Franks and Billy Gent – the hearings before the league's Investigation Committee had run until 4:45am on the Friday morning before the teams' next games. The players had been reported not by the game's umpire, but by the opposing club secretaries – and on these grounds, the suspensions were ultimately overturned in May 1908, but not before all four players missed the grand final.

Carlton's Jim Flynn, who began the season as captain but had retired from VFL football at midseason to run his business in St James, had returned to play with Carlton through the finals, and assumed the captaincy in Elliott's absence.

== See also ==
- 1907 VFL season
