= 1909 VFL grand final =

Grand final of the 1909 Victorian Football League season

1909 VFL Grand Final

South Melbourne	Carlton
4.14 (38)	4.12 (36)
	1	2	3	4
SM	0.5 (5)	2.9 (21)	4.12 (36)	4.14 (38)
CAR	0.5 (5)	2.9 (21)	3.11 (29)	4.12 (36)
- Date: 2 October 1909
- Stadium: Melbourne Cricket Ground
- Attendance: 37,759

The 1909 VFL Grand Final was an Australian rules football game contested between the Carlton Football Club and South Melbourne Football Club, held at the Melbourne Cricket Ground in Melbourne on 2 October 1909. It was the 12th annual Grand Final of the Victorian Football League, staged to determine the premiers for the 1909 VFL season. The match, attended by 37,759 spectators, was won by South Melbourne by two points, marking that club's first premiership victory.

== The Season ==
Carlton and South Melbourne finished in the top two during the minor round of the 1909 season, each finishing with a 14–4 record. South Melbourne was the minor premier, with a higher percentage than Carlton. Carlton won the clubs' two meetings during the minor rounds: in Round 2 by 17 points; and in Round 11 by 24 points, after trailing 0.11 (11) to 4.4 (28) at half-time, then scoring nine goals to none in the third quarter.

During the season, the Carlton Football Club had been split by infighting within the committee, resulting in the resignation of coach Jack Worrall Round 13. Captain Fred "Pompey" Elliott took over the coaching duties in Round 14, and Carlton won its last four matches.

As premiers in 1906, 1907, and 1908, Carlton was attempting to win its fourth consecutive premiership. On the other hand, South Melbourne was attempting to win its first premiership.

The finals were played under the amended Argus system. Both teams won their semi-finals, but Carlton defeated South Melbourne in the final 10.9 (69) to 7.5 (47): South Melbourne, as minor premiers, was therefore entitled to a Grand Final challenge match, and the winner of this match would win the premiership.

== The Grand Final ==
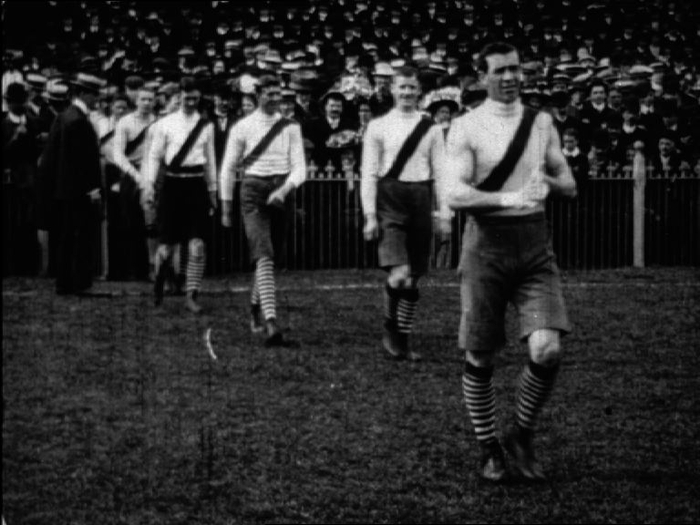
Still image taken from footage of the 1909 VFL Grand Final. South Melbourne players enter the field before the game

The South Melbourne side was missing full-back Bill Dolphin, who was injured; winger Jim Caldwell, who had been suspended for nine matches for striking Carlton's George Bruce in the previous week's preliminary final; and top forward Dick Casey, who was injured from the previous week's final. Had Casey been fit, he would have taken pressure off South Melbourne's leading goalkicker that season, Len Mortimer, who, despite kicking a goal, played indifferently throughout. South's replacements were Bob Deas, Horrie Drane, and Ted Wade. Norm Clark was available for Carlton; he replaced Les Beck from the Blues' winning Final side of the previous week.

The match, played in a rather unsettling wind, was very closely contested, with the teams tied at both quarter- and half-time. In the first quarter, South Melbourne's back-flanker Tom Grimshaw was knocked out, but he eventually recovered consciousness and finished the match standing in the goal square. In the second quarter, Carlton's Jack Baquie badly injured his ankle and left the field, but he eventually returned in the third quarter to stand in the forward pocket. In the third quarter, Carlton rover Martin Gotz was knocked out and was carried from the ground on a stretcher, but he returned to the ground in the last quarter and stood in the forward line.

In a powerful third quarter—in which Belcher, Ricketts, Cameron, Mortimer, and Gough in sequence brought the ball from the deep backline to the forward line untouched by a single Carlton player, eventuating in Gough's goal—South Melbourne drew ahead of Carlton, 4.12 (36) to 3.11 (29).

In the last quarter, Carlton had several chances to win, scoring 1.1 to South Melbourne's two behinds. With five minutes to go, "Mallee" Johnson and Charlie Hammond got the ball to centre half-forward Harvey Kelly, who kicked a goal, bringing Carlton to two points behind. Carlton lost the ensuing centre bounce at the restart of play. The ball got to South Melbourne's forward Len Mortimer, but his kick did not make the distance. Carlton moved forward, kicking the ball towards the goals, but William Thomas took what turned out to be a match-saving mark for South Melbourne, as the ball was not near either goal for the remainder of the match.

South Melbourne 4.14 (38) defeated Carlton 4.12 (36).

== Film ==
The 1909 Grand Final was filmed by Spencer's Pictures, a Sydney-based film company, and it is the oldest known surviving footage of Australian rules football in action. The near-complete silent film can be viewed on the National Film and Sound Archive's YouTube channel (see external links).

== Teams ==
S. Melbourne	Carlton

South Melbourne
B:	Alan Pentland	Jack Scobie	Ted Wade
HB:	Arthur Hiskins	William Thomas	Tom Grimshaw
C:	Horrie Drane	George Bower	Billy Moxham
HF:	Jim Cameron	Bob Deas	Dave Barry
F:	Alex Kerr	Len Mortimer	Alf Gough
Foll:	Bert Franks	Vic Belcher	Charlie Ricketts (c)
Coach:	Charlie Ricketts		

Carlton
B:	Norm Clark	Doug Gillespie	Jim Marchbank
HB:	Martin Gotz	Billy Payne	Arthur Ford
C:	George Bruce	Rod McGregor	Ted Kennedy
HF:	Frank Caine	Harvey Kelly	Fred Jinks
F:	Fred Elliott (c)	George Topping	Jack Baquie
Foll:	George Johnson	Charlie Hammond	Alex Lang
Coach:	Fred Elliot		

- Umpire – Jack Elder

== Statistics ==
=== Score ===
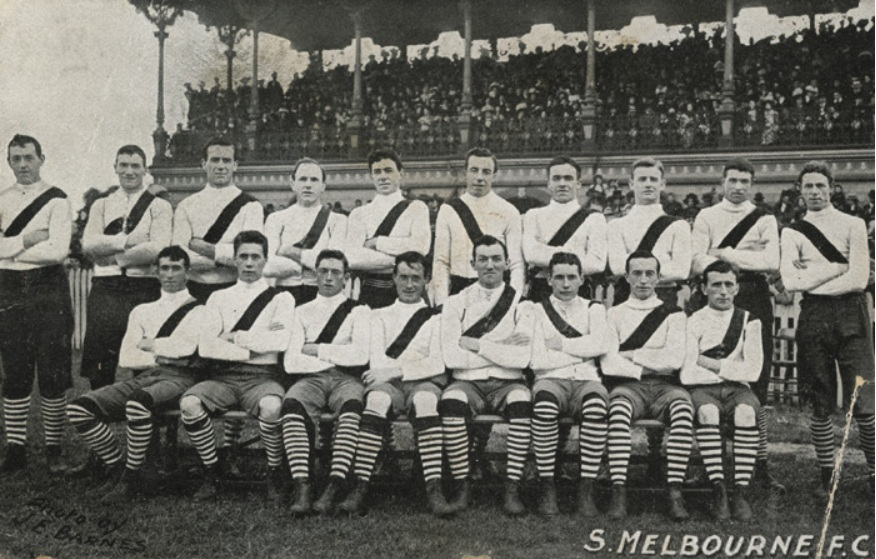
South Melbourne team, Premiers

Team	1	2	3	4	Total
South Melbourne	0.5	2.9	4.12	4.14	4.14 (38)
Carlton	0.5	2.9	3.11	4.12	4.12 (36)

=== Goal kickers ===
South Melbourne:

- Franks 1
- Gough 1
- Mortimer 1
- Ricketts 1

Carlton:

- Topping 2
- Baquie 1
- Kelly 1

== See also ==
- 1909 VFL season
