= Ted Wade (Australian footballer) =

Australian rules footballer

Personal information
- Full name: Charles Edward Wade
- Born: 22 December 1884; Port Fairy, Victoria
- Died: 30 August 1966 (aged 81); Glen Iris, Victoria
- Original team: Richmond (VFA)
- Height: 170 cm (5 ft 7 in)
- Weight: 66 kg (146 lb)

Playing career^{1}
Years	Club	Games (Goals)
1904	Melbourne	1 (0)
1906–1910	South Melbourne	60 (3)
Total		61 (3)
- ^{1} Playing statistics correct to the end of 1910.

Charles Edward Wade (22 December 1884 – 30 August 1966) was an Australian rules footballer who played with Melbourne and South Melbourne in the Victorian Football League (VFL).

Wade played some of his early football with Richmond, then in the Victorian Football Association, but also appeared for Leopold. He started his VFL career at Melbourne and made his league debut in round three of the 1904 VFL season, against Fitzroy at the MCG. It would be his only senior game for Melbourne.

Wade was a regular fixture in the South Melbourne team for four seasons, starting in 1906 when he did not miss a game. The following year he was South Melbourne's centreman in the 1907 VFL Grand Final, which they lost. He also played in the 1909 Grand Final, as a back pocket defender, replacing an injured Bill Dolphin. On this occasion he finished on the winning side, giving South Melbourne their first premiership.

During the 1910 VFL season, Wade left Melbourne to join Bairnsdale Football Club, as club captain.
