= Alex Kerr (Australian footballer) =

Australian rules footballer

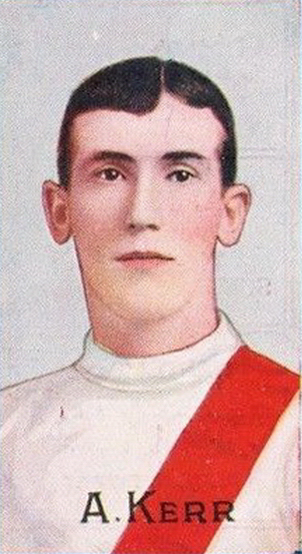
- Cigarette card of Kerr in 1909

Personal information
- Full name: Alexander Kerr
- Born: 13 November 1880; Port Melbourne, Victoria
- Died: 1 February 1965 (aged 84); Hawthorn, Victoria
- Original team: Port Rovers

Playing career^{1}
Years	Club	Games (Goals)
1906–1911	South Melbourne	74 (57)
- ^{1} Playing statistics correct to the end of 1911.

Alexander Kerr (13 November 1880 – 1 February 1965) was an Australian rules footballer who played with South Melbourne in the Victorian Football League (VFL).

Kerr, known by his nickname of "Bubs", was a rover, recruited from Metropolitan Junior Football Association side Port Rovers.

A knee injury brought an early end to his debut season and kept him out of action for over a year, until he came back into the team late in the 1907 VFL season. In just his third game back, Kerr kicked four goals in a semi final win over Collingwood. He then appeared as one of South Melbourne's followers in the 1907 Grand Final, which ended in a Carlton victory.

He appeared in all possible 21 games for South Melbourne in 1909, including their grand final win, when they reversed the result from two years earlier and defeated Carlton.

From 1912, until the war, Kerr played for Prahran.
