= 1935 SAAFL season =

1935 AFL premiership season
- Date: 27 April - 14 September
- Premiers: A1: St. Peter's O.C. A2: West Adelaide United
- Minor premiers: A1: St. Peter's O.C. A2: West Adelaide United
- Wooden spooners: A1: Kensington; A2: Adelaide High O.S.
- Best and fairest: A1 (Hone Medal): Ray McArthur (Goodwood; A2 (Chambers Medal): Bill Bentley (Teachers' College)
- Coleman Medallist: A1: Don Wallace (Exeter) 60 goals A2: Gordon Amos (West Adelaide United) 72 goals

The 1935 SAAFL season was the 21st season of the South Australian Amateur Football League (SAAFL).

The season commenced on 27 April and concluded on 14 September.

The 1935 season saw the return of Teachers' College (playing at Teachers College Oval on Mackinnor Parade, North Adelaide) and Scotch Old Collegians. The latter having been in the Adelaide Students' Association the previous season. Two clubs joined the league, new club, West Adelaide United (playing at Railways Oval) and Rechabites (playing at Park 17, next to Kenilworth's ground), which is the old Eastwood Rechabites' club, the 1934 premiers of the Rechabites Association (Rechabites Association not formed for 1935). The four new teams played in A2 which went from 7 to 8 teams, owing to the departure of 3 clubs. Black Forest joined Adelaide & Suburban, Unley Amateurs disbanded, and Y.M.C.A. went into recess for a season before returning in 1936.

The 1934 A2 Grand Finalists, Henley & Grange and Exeter, were promoted to A1, replacing bottom A1 Teams Prince Alfred Old Collegians and Alberton Church United.

== A1 ==
Underdale, University, Kensington, Kenilworth, St. Peter's Old Collegians, Goodwood, Henley & Grange, and Exeter

=== Ladder ===
Pos	Team	Pld	W	L	D	PF	PA	PP	Pts
1	St. Peters Old Collegians	14	12	2	0	1187	648		24
2	Underdale	14	11	3	0	1191	825		22
3	Kenilworth	14	9	5	0	1147	838		18
4	University	14	8	6	0	1192	830		16
5	Exeter	14	7	7	0	1024	962		14
6	Henley and Grange	14	6	8	0	837	1182		12
7	Goodwood	14	1	13	0	646	1212		2
8	Kensington	14	1	13	0	381	1108		2

=== Finals ===
==== Semi Finals ====
	Semi-finals
Saturday, 31 August	St. Peter's O.C. 14.14	def.	Kenilworth 9.8
Saturday, 31 August	Underdale 12.9	def.	University 9.5

==== Final ====
	Final
Saturday, 7 September	St. Peter's O.C. 8.9 (55)	def. by	Underdale 10.12 (72)	Railways Oval

==== Challenge Final ====
Challenge Final
Saturday, 14 September	St. Peter's O.C.	def.	Underdale	Unley Oval
5.3 (33); 5.5 (35); 9.5; 13.8 (86)	Q1; Q2; Q3; Final	3.3 (21); 7.8 (50); 8.10; 10.13 (73)	Umpires: Hounslow
Lee 5, Richmond 3, Jay 2, White, Maitland, Le Messurier	Goals	Spain 3, Matson 2, Juncken, Hepworth, Young, Wilson, Keville
Lee, L. Bridgland, Le Messurier, Clark, Jay	Best	Miller, Easom, Davis, Keville, Burnett

== A2 ==
Alberton Church United, Prince Alfred Old Collegians, Adelaide High Old Scholars, Semaphore Central, Scotch Old Collegians, Teachers' College, Rechabites, West Adelaide United.

=== Ladder ===
Pos	Team	Pld	W	L	D	PF	PA	PP	Pts
1	West Adelaide United	14	12	1	1	1415	725		25
2	Eastwood Rechabites	14	10	3	1	1340	879		21
3	Prince Alfred O.C.	14	10	4	0	1029	699		20
4	Semaphore Central	14	9	5	0	1460	919		18
5	Teachers College	14	7	7	0	1230	917		14
6	Scotch Old Collegians	13	4	9	0	811	1184		8
7	Alberton Church United	13	1	12	0	558	1464		2
8	Adelaide High O.S.	14	1	13	0	580	1636		2

=== Finals ===
==== Semi Finals ====
	Semi-finals
Saturday, 31 August	West Adelaide United 11.13	def.	Prince Alfred O.C. 9.9
Saturday, 31 August	Eastwood Rechabite 4.11	def. by	Semaphore Central 13.11

==== Final ====
Final
Saturday, 7 September	West Adelaide United	def.	Semaphore Central	Kenilworth ground, South Park
13.26	Q1; Q2; Q3; Final	11.10	Umpires: B.E. Schumacher
Matthews 4, G. Amos 3, Kemp 2, A. Amos, K. Brown, Lewis, Bellhouse	Goals	Hannam 3, Gould 2, Hinter, Benton, Robertson, Johnson, Fitzgerald
Hill, Thomas, Fimeri, Baird, A. Amos, Kemp	Best	Woodhead, Knight, Hinter, Hannam, Swain

== Representative ==
SAAFL
B:	Good	Burnard	Burnett
HB:	McFarlane	Bridgland	Bungey
C:	Elix	Marriott	Reeves
HF:	Bertram	Bentley	Tuohey
F:	Hill	Amos	Lee
Foll:	Colley	Bellhouse	Friedrichs
Emg:	Scott	Sangster	Mattie

VAFA
B:	Walker	Forty	Lamb
HB:	McNaughton	Hepples	Klene
C:	Dowling	Stanes	Howse
HF:	Mason-Cox	Peters	Whiting
F:	O'Toole	Pearson	Trinnick
Foll:	Corke	Kennedy	Vontom
Emg:	Wimpole	Moore	

3 June	V.A.F.A	def.	S.A.A.F.L	Richmond Cricket Ground
6.4; 9.8; 20.10; 24.15	Q1; Q2; Q3; Final	4.2; 8.5; 11.12; 15.17	Umpires: Reilly
Pearson 12, Peters 4, Corke 2, Mason-Cox 2, Trinnick 2, Morton, Dowling	Goals	Amos 4, Friedrichs 4, Bellhouse 3, Hill 2, Bentley 2
Pearson, Peters, Forty, Whiting, Hepples, Corke	Best	Friedrichs, Amos, Hill, Lee, Bellhouse, Bentley

== Rule Trial Game ==
The League trialed having 16 a side, with 3 reserves. This was trialed with the aim to remove congestion. At the suggestion of the South Australian president at a conference with the Victorian and Tasmanian Amateur leagues to be on the agenda for the Amateur Football Council meeting in August 1935. A trial match between combined teams representing A1 and A2 grades was held on 20 July. At the Amateur Football Council meeting, Victoria opposed the proposition, and the plan was shelved.

Rule Trial
Saturday, 20 July	Grade A1	def. by	Grade A2
12.14 (86)	Q1; Q2; Q3; Final	20.8 (128)
Richmond 6, Lee 3, Walker 2, Bertram	Goals	G. Amos 7, Bradshaw 6, Bentley 5, Tuohy 2
Richmond, Elix, Bridgland, Lee, Marriott	Best	Diercks, G. Amos, Bradshaw, Tuohy, Lee, Bentley
