= Martin Gotz =

Australian rules footballer

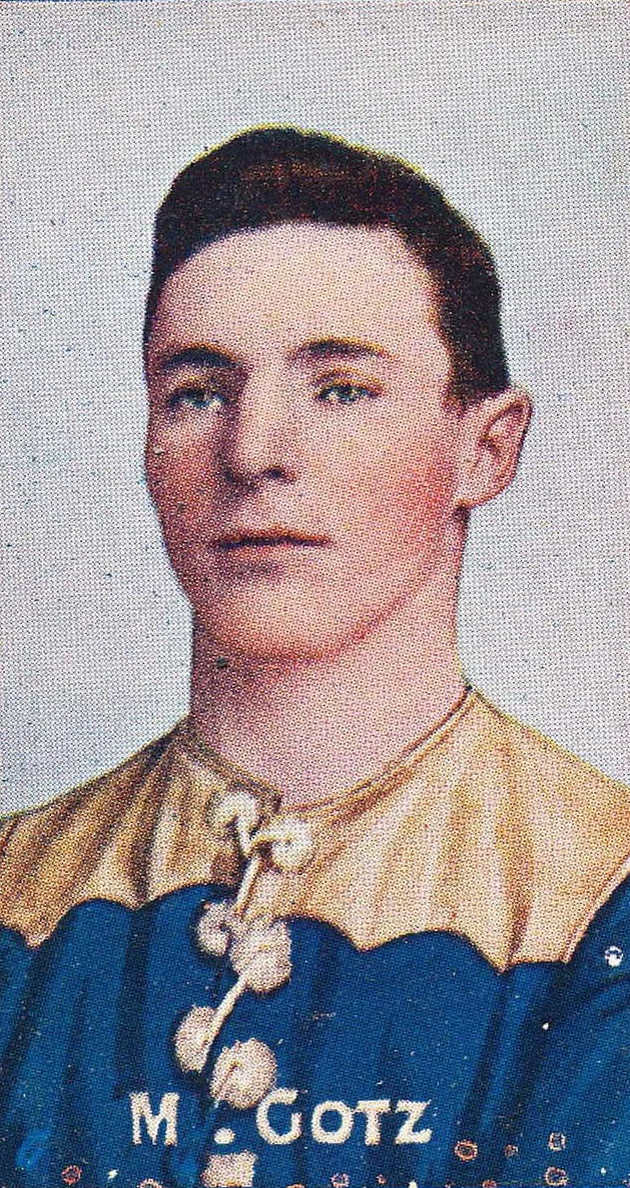
- Cigarette card of Gotz in 1908

Personal information
- Full name: Martin Gustav Gotz
- Born: 26 February 1883; Sandhurst
- Died: 13 August 1967 (aged 84); Brighton, Victoria
- Original team: Port Melbourne
- Height: 179 cm (5 ft 10 in)
- Weight: 75 kg (165 lb)
- Position: Rover

Playing career^{1}
Years	Club	Games (Goals)
1902, 1905, 1914–15	Port Melbourne (VFA)	30
1903	Perth (WAFL)	12
1904	East Fremantle (WAFL)	14
1906–11, 1913	Carlton (VFL)	106 (42)
- ^{1} Playing statistics correct to the end of 1915.

Career highlights
- East Fremantle premiership player (1904); Carlton premiership player (1907, 1908)

Martin Gustav Gotz (26 February 1883 – 13 August 1967) was an Australian rules footballer in the early 20th century who most notably played for Carlton in the Victorian Football League (VFL).

Gotz started his senior career at Port Melbourne Football Club in the Victorian Football Association (VFA) in 1902 before heading to Western Australia the following year to play for Perth Football Club. His form for Perth however was ordinary and the club cleared Gotz to East Fremantle Football Club. At East Fremantle however, Gotz became a leading player, playing on the half back flank in East Fremantle's 1904 premiership team.

Gotz returned to Port Melbourne in 1905 before transferring to VFL club Carlton where he made his senior debut in 1906 but missed out on the club's inaugural VFL premiership when he was injured in the Semi Final. He did however participate in their 1907 and 1908 premierships, as well as the losing Grand Finals of 1909 and 1910.

In 1912 Gotz sought a clearance to fellow VFL club St Kilda and when it was refused he decided to stand out of football for the year. Gotz returned to Carlton in 1913, before returning to Port Melbourne as playing coach for 1914–15, the final years of VFA football before World War I. Gotz did not return to senior football after the war.

Although he didn't kick many goals in his career, he did manage to kick a bag of six against Richmond in 1909.

Gotz was involved in a controversial incident in the 1911 season, where he was alleged to have assaulted Melbourne University player Vic Trood during a game. Gotz was convicted of assault by the Melbourne District Court and was fined £10, but the conviction was quashed upon appeal.

Altogether, in a career spanning fourteen years, three leagues and four teams, Gotz played 162 senior games and won three premierships.

== Sources ==
- Atkinson, G. (1982) Everything you ever wanted to know about Australian rules football but couldn't be bothered asking, The Five Mile Press: Melbourne. ISBN 0 86788 009 0.
- Holmesby, Russell and Main, Jim (2007). The Encyclopedia of AFL Footballers. 7th ed. Melbourne: Bas Publishing.
