= Hughie Callan =

Australian rules footballer

Personal information
- Full name: Philip Hughes Callan
- Born: 26 December 1881; Ararat, Victoria
- Died: 5 February 1917 (aged 35); Gueudecourt, France
- Original team: Brighton
- Height: 182 cm (6 ft 0 in)
- Weight: 80 kg (176 lb)
- Position: Follower

Playing career^{1}
Years	Club	Games (Goals)
1903–05	Essendon	35 (15)
1907–10	South Melbourne	36 (17)
Total		71 (32)
- ^{1} Playing statistics correct to the end of 1910.

Philip Hughes Callan (26 December 1881 – 5 February 1917) was an Australian rules footballer who played for Essendon and South Melbourne in the Victorian Football League (VFL).

He was killed in action serving with the First AIF in France.

== Family ==
The son of Philip Hughes Callan (1840–1893), and Rose Margaret Callan, née Miller, Philip Hughes Callan was born at Ararat, Victoria, on 26 December 1881.

He married Eleanor Lilian "Lala" Williams on 17 June 1911.

== Education ==
He grew up in Melbourne, and attended Christian Brothers College, Victoria Parade, East Melbourne.

== Football ==
Callan, who played his entire career as an amateur, played in the ruck, and was noted for his "nimbleness of foot", "extreme courage", and "excellent palming of the ball".

"Educated at St. Patrick's College, Melbourne, the late Hughie Callan early gave promise of developing into a great player – a promise which was amply fulfilled. On the field he was quick, clever, and daring; a trifle reckless at times, yet always an opponent from whom danger was to be expected, as he was capable of doing exceptional things." – The Record, 10 March 1917.

=== Essendon (VFL) ===
Callan's career began at Essendon in 1903 after he was recruited from Brighton. He spent three seasons with Essendon.

=== Eden (AFLA) ===
In 1906 he didn't play VFL football because he had been sent to New Zealand by his employer, the Bank of Australasia.

In New Zealand, Callan played for the Eden Football Club in the Australian Football League of Auckland during the 1906 season. Also in that year, he represented Auckland in an inter-provincial match against Waihi.

=== South Melbourne (VFL) ===
Callan returned the following year and joined South Melbourne, playing as a forward pocket in their losing 1907 VFL Grand Final team.

=== Corangamite Football Association ===
Callan owned a pub in Terang and in 1910 played for Camperdown (as well as a single game for South Melbourne) and in 1911 played for Terang in the Corangamite Football Association.

=== Hawthorn (MAFA) ===
In 1912 Callan was appointed captain of the Hawthorn Football Club in the Metropolitan Amateur Football Association (MAFA).

== Military service ==
Callan enlisted in the First AIF on 14 January 1916, and embarked for overseas service in the HMAT Port Lincoln (A17) on 4 May 1916.

== Death ==
On 5 February 1917, Callan was killed in action while fighting in France during World War I.

He was buried at Bancourt British Cemetery, in France.

== Remembered ==
In the 1919 VFL pre-season, the Weekly Times football correspondent, "Rover", visited the South Melbourne Football Club, and had a long discussion with Herb Howson and Jack Marshall.

Herb Howson, the 1919 coach, had coached South Melbourne to a premiership in 1918, had played 204 VFA/VFL games for the club over 16 seasons (1893 to 1908), and had served as a club official in one capacity or another for many years. Jack "Twister" Marshall, the team's head trainer, originally a trainer of champion boxers, had served the club continuously as a trainer since 1883.

Given their extensive and detailed knowledge of football, and of the preceding thirty years or so at South Melbourne, the discussion soon turned to the great players of the past:

"Marshall and Howson agreed that the [1889] team was the best side that ever represented South.
In two or three minutes they were able to recall the names, although 20 years have elapsed since these men carried the honors to Albert Park. Here is the list:— [Peter] Burns, [Harry] "Sonny" Elms, [Ben] Page, [Dinny] McKay, W. [Billy"] Spence, [Joe] Wyatt, [Bill] Windley, [Fred] Waugh, [Bolivar] Powell, R. ["Bob"] Talbot, ["Jimmy"] Graham, [Tom] Glen, [Edgar] Barrett, [Arthur] Brown, [Jack] Middleton, [Harry] Purdy, J. ["Jimmie"] O'Meara, [Richard "Chopper"] Doran, J. ["Bosko"] Dunn, ["Dick'] Kerr, [Archie] McMurray.
Asked to name the champion Southern player of the period, they selected Peter Burns, but with some hesitancy, Dinny McKay being one of the men who caused them to think before speaking.
For his size, Hughie Callan (formerly of Essendon and afterwards of South), was declared to have been the finest player of all. With marvellous stamina, the speed of a greyhound, and the skill of a master, the late Hughie Callan, then playing with Essendon, was declared to have once beaten South "on his own".
How very sad that the war should have exacted the supreme sacrifice from so many of our superb athletes, Callan among them!

== See also ==
- List of Victorian Football League players who died on active service
