= List of VFL/AFL wooden spoons =

The wooden spoon is the imaginary and ironic "award" which is said to be won by the team finishing in last place in the Australian Football League. No physical wooden spoon award exists, other than those brought by opposition fans to taunt struggling teams, nor is such an award officially sanctioned by the VFL/AFL. However, most betting agencies will take wagers on the wooden spoon. Port Adelaide remains the only team who has not obtained a wooden spoon record.

== Criteria ==
The team which finishes on the bottom of the ladder wins the wooden spoon. This is determined by:

- Fewest premiership points (four points for a win, two points for a draw)
- Lowest percentage (the ratio of points for to points against if on same numbers of points)

No countback exists if teams finish equal on points but with a different number of wins.

=== 1901–1907 ===
From 1901 to 1907, the VFL season was set up such that each team played fourteen regular season games: two games against each opponent. Based upon regular season ladder positions, teams were divided into pools A (1st, 3rd, 5th and 7th) and B (2nd, 4th, 6th and 8th), and each team played the opponents from its pool once each in the "sectional round."

Following the sectional round, the results of these matches were added to the ladder to give a final ladder based on seventeen matches per team. As such, the wooden spooner is considered to be the team which finishes last after all seventeen matches.

The three sectional games changed the outcome of the wooden spoon twice in the seven seasons of this format: in 1905, St Kilda beat Geelong in their last game, relegating Melbourne to last, and in 1907, Fitzroy won all three of their games, relegating Essendon to last.

=== 1916 ===
In 1916, only four teams (Carlton, Collingwood, Fitzroy and Richmond) competed due to World War I. Fitzroy finished last after the home-and-away season with a record of 2–9–1 (10 pts), and Richmond finished third with a record of 5–7–0 (20 pts).

All four teams competed in the finals under the amended Argus system in place at the time. Richmond lost their semi-final and finished in overall last place as the lowest placed semi-final loser, while Fitzroy won their semi-final, the final and the grand final to win the premiership. This has created uncertainty to some extent regarding which club won the 1916 wooden spoon: by analogy with the minor and major premierships, it could be said that Fitzroy won the "minor wooden spoon" and Richmond won the "major wooden spoon".

The official AFL Season Guide recognises Richmond as the wooden spooners for the 1916 VFL season, and likewise contemporary Football Records listed Fitzroy's position as first and Richmond's as fourth. However, finals have never in any other season changed the outcome of the wooden spoon, and it is commonly said that Fitzroy won both the premiership and the wooden spoon in the same season.

== Wooden spoons by season ==
Season	Wooden spoon	Wins	Losses	Draws	Percentage	Points
1897	St Kilda	0	14	0	29.1	0
1898	St Kilda (2)	0	14	0	33.5	0
1899	St Kilda (3)	0	14	0	28.0	0
1900	St Kilda (4)	1	13	0	39.1	4
1901	St Kilda (5)	1	16	0	–	4
1902	St Kilda (6)	0	17	0	–	0
1903	South Melbourne	2	15	0	–	8
1904	St Kilda (7)	3	14	0	–	12
1905	Melbourne	3	14	0	–	12
1906	Melbourne (2)	1	16	0	–	4
1907	Essendon	5	12	0	–	20
1908	Geelong	2	16	0	–	8
1909	St Kilda (8)	2	15	0	59.3	8
1910	St Kilda (9)	1	17	0	62.3	4
1911	University	1	17	0	52.1	4
1912	University (2)	1	17	0	57.0	4
1913	University (3)	0	18	0	57.6	0
1914	University (4)	0	18	0	47.0	0
1915	Geelong (2)	3	13	0	68.0	12
1916 Minor; 1916 Major	Fitzroy; Richmond	2; 5	9; 7	1; 0	81.6; 89.9	10; 20
1917	Richmond (2)	3	11	1	–	14
1918	Essendon (2)	3	11	0	64.2	12
1919	Melbourne (3)	0	16	0	43.0	0
1920	St Kilda (10)	2	14	0	57.2	8
1921	Essendon (3)	3	11	2	80.8	16
1922	South Melbourne (2)	4	11	1	91.3	18
1923	Melbourne (4)	3	13	0	80.4	12
1924	St Kilda (11)	4	12	0	75.7	16
1925	Hawthorn	3	14	0	66.1	12
1926	North Melbourne	0	17	1	73.7	2
1927	Hawthorn (2)	1	17	0	63.1	4
1928	Hawthorn (3)	0	18	0	61.6	0
1929	North Melbourne (2)	1	17	0	60.2	4
1930	North Melbourne (3)	1	17	0	51.8	4
1931	North Melbourne (4)	0	18	0	50.8	0
1932	Hawthorn (4)	3	15	0	64.1	12
1933	Essendon (4)	2	16	0	77.1	12
1934	North Melbourne (5)	0	18	0	66.4	0
1935	North Melbourne (6)	1	17	0	65.1	4
1936	Fitzroy (2)	2	16	0	68.9	8
1937	North Melbourne (7)	3	15	0	64.2	12
1938	South Melbourne (3)	2	16	0	71.8	8
1939	South Melbourne (4)	3	15	0	70.8	12
1940	North Melbourne (8)	4	14	0	75.1	16
1941	Hawthorn (5)	3	15	0	68.2	12
1942	Hawthorn (6)	1	14	0	65.6	8
1943	St Kilda (12)	1	8	1	73.9	10
1944	Geelong (3)	1	17	0	58.6	4
1945	St Kilda (13)	2	18	0	62.2	8
1946	Hawthorn (7)	3	16	0	70.5	12
1947	St Kilda (14)	1	17	1	58.7	6
1948	St Kilda (15)	2	17	0	59.9	8
1949	Hawthorn (8)	3	16	0	61.1	12
1950	Hawthorn (9)	0	18	0	49.8	0
1951	Melbourne (5)	1	17	0	70.5	4
1952	St Kilda (16)	2	17	0	68.1	8
1953	Hawthorn (10)	3	15	0	68.5	12
1954	St Kilda (17)	4	13	1	72.7	18
1955	St Kilda (18)	1	17	0	45.4	4
1956	North Melbourne (9)	3	16	0	69.5	12
1957	Geelong (4)	5	12	1	88.2	22
1958	Geelong (5)	4	14	0	73.8	16
1959	Footscray	3	15	0	73.3	12
1960	Richmond (3)	2	14	2	65.1	12
1961	North Melbourne (10)	4	13	1	79.1	18
1962	South Melbourne (5)	3	15	0	74.4	12
1963	Fitzroy (3)	1	17	0	57.5	4
1964	Fitzroy (4)	0	18	0	59.7	0
1965	Hawthorn (11)	4	14	0	68.9	16
1966	Fitzroy (5)	1	17	0	53.8	4
1967	Footscray (2)	4	14	0	71.8	16
1968	North Melbourne (11)	3	17	0	74.3	12
1969	Melbourne (6)	3	17	0	83.1	12
1970	North Melbourne (12)	4	18	0	79.1	16
1971	South Melbourne (6)	3	19	0	69.9	12
1972	North Melbourne (13)	1	21	0	62.9	4
1973	South Melbourne (7)	4	18	0	79.0	16
1974	Melbourne (7)	3	19	0	77.1	12
1975	South Melbourne (8)	2	20	0	75.0	8
1976	Collingwood	6	16	0	86.4	24
1977	St Kilda (19)	3	17	2	73.5	16
1978	Melbourne (8)	5	17	0	69.1	20
1979	St Kilda (20)	3	19	0	65.0	12
1980	Fitzroy (6)	4	17	1	86.0	18
1981	Melbourne (9)	1	21	0	63.5	4
1982	Footscray (3)	3	19	0	68.1	12
1983	St Kilda (21)	5	17	0	79	20
1984	St Kilda (22)	5	17	0	76	20
1985	St Kilda (23)	3	19	0	64.7	12
1986	St Kilda (24)	2	20	0	71.9	8
1987	Richmond (4)	5	17	0	83	20
1988	St Kilda (25)	4	18	0	82	16
1989	Richmond (5)	5	17	0	71	20
1990	Brisbane Bears	4	18	0	71	16
1991	Brisbane Bears (2)	3	19	0	70	12
1992	Sydney (9)	3	18	1	74	14
1993	Sydney (10)	1	19	0	63	4
1994	Sydney (11)	4	18	0	78	16
1995	Fitzroy (7)	2	20	0	58.2	8
1996	Fitzroy (8)	1	21	0	49.5	4
1997	Melbourne (10)	4	18	0	60.8	16
1998	Brisbane Lions	5	16	1	75	22
1999	Collingwood (2)	4	18	0	84.8	16
2000	St Kilda (26)	2	19	1	70.5	10
2001	Fremantle	2	20	0	72.0	8
2002	Carlton	3	19	0	73.1	12
2003	Western Bulldogs (4)	3	18	1	74.8	14
2004	Richmond (6)	4	18	0	69.2	16
2005	Carlton (2)	4	17	1	75.5	18
2006	Carlton (3)	3	18	1	74.2	14
2007	Richmond (7)	3	18	1	77.2	14
2008	Melbourne (11)	3	19	0	62.6	12
2009	Melbourne (12)	4	18	0	74.7	16
2010	West Coast	4	18	0	77.1	16
2011	Gold Coast	3	19	0	56.27	12
2012	Greater Western Sydney	2	20	0	46.17	8
2013	Greater Western Sydney (2)	1	21	0	50.97	4
2014	St Kilda (27)	4	18	0	60.8	16
2015	Carlton (4)	4	18	0	64.8	16
2016	Essendon (5)	3	19	0	61	12
2017	Brisbane Lions (2)	5	17	0	74.3	20
2018	Carlton (5)	2	20	0	59.3	8
2019	Gold Coast (2)	3	19	0	60.5	12
2020	Adelaide	3	14	0	64.4	12
2021	North Melbourne (14)	4	17	1	70.3	18
2022	North Melbourne (15)	2	20	0	55.8	8
2023	West Coast (2)	3	20	0	53.0	12
2024	Richmond (8)	2	21	0	63.7	8
2025	West Coast (3)	1	22	0	60.1	4
2026	Essendon (6)	2	21	0	64.6	8

== Wooden spoons by club ==
Club	Total Wooden Spoons	Years of Wooden Spoon
**St Kilda**	27	1897, 1898, 1899, 1900, 1901, 1902, 1904, 1909, 1910, 1920, 1924, 1943, 1945, 1947, 1948, 1952, 1954, 1955, 1977, 1979, 1983, 1984, 1985, 1986, 1988, 2000, 2014
**North Melbourne**	15	1926, 1929, 1930, 1931, 1934, 1935, 1937, 1940, 1956, 1961, 1968, 1970, 1972, 2021, 2022
**Melbourne**	12	1905, 1906, 1919, 1923, 1951, 1969, 1974, 1978, 1981, 1997, 2008, 2009
**Hawthorn**	11	1925, 1927, 1928, 1932, 1941, 1942, 1946, 1949, 1950, 1953, 1965
**Sydney**	11	1903, 1922, 1938, 1939, 1962, 1971, 1973, 1975, 1992, 1993, 1994
**Richmond**	8	1916, 1917, 1960, 1987, 1989, 2004, 2007, 2024
Fitzroy	7	1936, 1963, 1964, 1966, 1980, 1995, 1996
**Essendon**	6	1907, 1918, 1921, 1933, 2016, 2026
**Geelong**	5	1908, 1915, 1944, 1957, 1958
**Carlton**	5	2002, 2005, 2006, 2015, 2018
University	4	1911, 1912, 1913, 1914
**Western Bulldogs**	4	1959, 1967, 1982, 2003
**West Coast**	3	2010, 2023, 2025
Brisbane Bears	2	1990, 1991
**Collingwood**	2	1976, 1999
**Greater Western Sydney**	2	2012, 2013
**Brisbane Lions**	2	1998, 2017
**Gold Coast**	2	2011, 2019
**Fremantle**	1	2001
**Adelaide**	1	2020
**Port Adelaide**	0	N/A

Bold indicates clubs currently playing in the AFL.

== Longest wooden spoon droughts ==
Note: This is a ranking of individual drought streaks, not a ranking of clubs by their longest drought.

Club	Time period	Years
Carlton	1897–2002	105
Essendon	1933–2016	83
Collingwood	1897–1976	79
Geelong	1958–present	69
Hawthorn	1965–present	62
North Melbourne	1972–2021	49
Richmond	1917–1960	43
Fitzroy	1897–1936 (Note: See 1916 for more information)	39
Footscray	1925–1959	34
Sydney	1994–present	33
Port Adelaide	1997–present	30
Adelaide	1991–2020	29
Geelong	1915–1944	29
Melbourne	1923–1951	28
Collingwood	1999–present	28
Richmond	1960–1987	27
Fitzroy	1936–1963	27
Fremantle	2001–present	26
Western Bulldogs	2003–present	24
West Coast	1987–2010	23
Collingwood	1976–1999	23
South Melbourne	1939–1962	23
St Kilda	1955–1977	22
Footscray	1982–2003	21

== Active wooden spoon droughts ==
Club	Last won	Years since
Geelong	1958	69
Hawthorn	1965	62
Sydney	1994	33
Port Adelaide	Never	30
Collingwood	1999	28
Fremantle	2001	26
Western Bulldogs	2003	24
Melbourne	2009	18
Greater Western Sydney	2013	14
St Kilda	2014	13
Brisbane Lions	2017	10
Carlton	2018	9
Gold Coast	2019	8
Adelaide	2020	7
North Melbourne	2022	5
Richmond	2024	3
West Coast	2025	2
Essendon	2026	1

== Consecutive wooden spoons ==
Club	Years spanning	Number
St Kilda	1897, 1898, 1899, 1900, 1901, 1902	6

== AFL Women's ==
Season	Wooden spoon	Wins	Losses	Draws	Percentage	Points
2017	Greater Western Sydney	1	5	1	51.8	6
2018	Carlton	2	5	0	54.1	8
2019	No single last-placed finisher due to conferences; the lowest overall record was Collingwood, 1–6					
2020	No single last-placed finisher due to conferences; the lowest overall record was Richmond, 0–6					
2021	Gold Coast	0	9	0	36.5	0
2022 (S6)	West Coast	1	9	0	42.9	4
2022 (S7)	Sydney	0	10	0	35.9	0
2023	Western Bulldogs	1	9	0	53.8	4
2024	Collingwood	1	10	0	44.3	4
2025	Gold Coast (2)	2	10	0	41.3	8
2026	St Kilda	1	11	0	46.7	4

== See also ==
- Australian rugby league wooden spooners
