= Phonse Wood =

Australian rules footballer

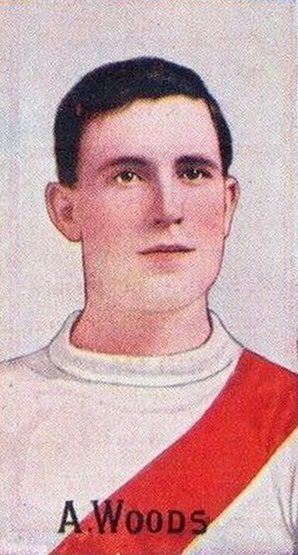
- Cigarette card of Wood in 1909

Personal information
- Full name: Francis Alphonse Wood
- Born: 24 September 1884; Karridale, Western Australia
- Died: 4 June 1976 (aged 91); Heidelberg, Victoria
- Original team: South Fremantle

Playing career^{1}
Years	Club	Games (Goals)
1907–1908	South Melbourne	30 (0)
- ^{1} Playing statistics correct to the end of 1908.

Francis Alphonse Wood (24 September 1884 – 4 June 1976) was an Australian rules footballer who played with South Melbourne in the Victorian Football League (VFL).

Wood was a Western Australian, who started out at North Fremantle before playing with South Fremantle in the 1906 season.

He then joined South Melbourne, in 1907, for a two-year stint. In his first season, he played in a Grand Final loss and the following year he represented the VFL at the 1908 Melbourne Carnival.

Once his time at South Melbourne came to an end he signed with Sturt in South Australia.

In 1909 Wood joined Prahran in the Victorian Football Association (VFA) and he was appointed as coach in 1910.

In 1912 Wood joined a team in Broken Hill.

May 1913 – 1914 Has re-joined Prahran after being blocked by the league.

In 1915 a very brief stint at coaching Hawthorn before returning to Prahran the same year.

== See also ==
- 1908 Melbourne Carnival
