= Bill Goddard (footballer) =

Australian rules footballer (1880–1939)

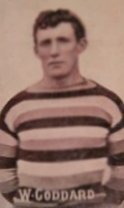

Personal information
- Full name: William George Goddard
- Born: 24 February 1880; Corop, Victoria
- Died: 26 August 1939 (aged 59); Fremantle, Western Australia
- Original team: South Fremantle (WAFA)
- Position: Centreman

Playing career^{1}
Years	Club	Games (Goals)
1900	South Fremantle	1 (0)
1902–1906	North Fremantle	65 (?)
1907–08	South Melbourne	28 (17)
1910	Carlton	13 (2)
1911	St Kilda	7 (0)
1913	Port Melbourne	10 (0)
1914–1918	East Fremantle	64 (2)
Total		130 (21)
- ^{1} Playing statistics correct to the end of 1918.

Career highlights
- East Fremantle premiership player (1918)

William George Goddard (24 February 1880 – 26 August 1939) was an Australian rules footballer who played for South Melbourne, Carlton and St Kilda in the Victorian Football League (VFL).

== Family ==
The son of Arthur Goddard (-1884), and Matilda Goddard, née Clark, William George Goddard was born at Corop, Victoria on 24 February 1880.

== Football ==
=== WAFL ===
A late-comer to VFL football, Goddard played a game for South Fremantle in 1900 and spent five years at North Fremantle before going to Victoria; and, in June 1903, he was suspended for entering the opposition's change rooms after the match and assaulting one of its players. He had previously visited the eastern state in 1904 when he toured with the Western Australian interstate football team.

=== VFL (South Melbourne) ===
Goddard, who was a centreman, performed well in his first season at South Melbourne but missed out on a place in their 1907 Grand Final team.

He played fourteen games for South Melbourne in 1908.

=== Application for clearance (1909) ===
In 1909, having played in all of South Melbourne's pre-season practice games, yet not having been being selected to play, and "[having] seen a couple of the Carlton players who told him that he could get a game" and "[having seen] one of the committee, and [having] decided to apply for a clearance", Goddard took the extraordinary step of independently applying for an (unsolicited) clearance to Carlton.

The VFL Permit Committee (the chairman was C.N. Hickey, also secretary of the Fitzroy Football Club) met on 19 May 1909, and considered Goddard's request. An in camera discussion (the press excluded) was held between the Committee, Goddard, Jack Worrall, the Carlton delegate, and Henry Hawkins Skinner, the South Melbourne delegate.

Noting that, although South Melbourne had agreed to release Goddard – having informed Goddard "that he will not be selected in our team as we do not considered him good enough as a player" – it also noted that Jack Worrall stated that "This application has been made without the consent of my committee, and I further wish to state the committee do not desire the services of Mr. Goddard". The Committee refused his application; and, "in answer to a question by Goddard as to whether he could apply to go to another club, [the Committee] said, "Your clearance is not sufficient to entitle you to a permit to play with any club"."

As a consequence, Goddard did not play anywhere at all in the VFL in 1909; and, although there was talk of him possibly going to play with Prahran in the VFA, there is no evidence of him ever having done so.

=== VFL (Carlton) ===
He was granted a clearance from South Melbourne to Carlton in 1910; and played there as a defender.

In a tumultuous season for Carlton, which began with the sacking of coach Jack Worrall and ended with two players (Doug Fraser and Alex Lang) suspended for taking bribes, Carlton still managed to make the Grand Final. Goddard played at back pocket in the 1910 Grand Final, in which Carlton lost to Collingwood by 14 points.

=== VFL (St Kilda) ===
In 1911, he crossed to St Kilda, with whom he played seven senior games.

=== WAFL ===
Goddard continued to play in the WAFL well into his 30s and was a member of East Fremantle's 1914 premiership side. His final season was in 1918 (at the age of 38); and only an injury stopped him from ending his career with another premiership, with East Fremantle winning that year's Grand Final.

== Death ==
He died at Fremantle on 26 August 1939.

== See also ==
- 1908 Melbourne Carnival
