= Harry Wilson (Australian footballer) =

Australian rules footballer

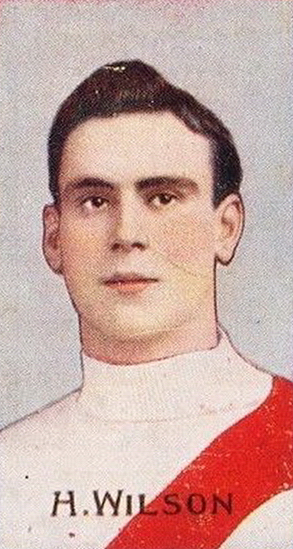
- Cigarette card of Wilson in 1909

Personal information
- Full name: Harry Wilson
- Born: 16 July 1885
- Died: 25 July 1972 (aged 87)
- Original team: Newtown

Playing career^{1}
Years	Club	Games (Goals)
1906	West Melbourne (VFA)	
1907–1908	South Melbourne	10 (2)
1908–1910	Prahran (VFA)	
- ^{1} Playing statistics correct to the end of 1908.

Harry Wilson (16 July 1885 – 25 July 1972) was an Australian rules footballer who played with South Melbourne in the Victorian Football League (VFL).

Wilson came to South Melbourne from West Melbourne at the start of the 1907 season. He was injured at start of season but made his debut against Fitzroy in Round 7. He was a back pocket defender for South Melbourne in their 1907 VFL Grand Final loss to Carlton.

He was dropped after two rounds in 1908 and obtained a permit to move to Prahran in June 1908 where he played for the next few years.
