= Alan Pentland =

Australian rules footballer and cricketer

Personal information
- Full name: George Alan Campbell Pentland
- Born: 3 October 1883; South Melbourne, Victoria
- Died: 15 December 1952 (aged 69); Hawthorn, Victoria
- Original team: Leopold

Playing career^{1}
Years	Club	Games (Goals)
1909–1912	South Melbourne	53 (0)
- ^{1} Playing statistics correct to the end of 1912.

George Alan Campbell Pentland (3 October 1883 – 15 December 1952) was an Australian rules footballer who played with South Melbourne in the Victorian Football League (VFL).

== Family ==
The son of William Christie Pentland (1844–1931), and Euphemia Craig Pentland (1848–1924), née Morison, George Alan Campbell Pentland was born on 3 October 1883.

He married Queenie Australia Osborn (1888–1955) on 23 August 1913.

== Football ==
Pentland was a defender who played in the back pocket for South Melbourne in their 1909 VFL Grand Final team which won the club's first ever premiership.

He appeared in all 20 games in 1910 and the following season played finals football for the third successive year.

His last game for South Melbourne came in 1912.

== Cricket ==
He remained on the local sports scene as a cricketer.

He played in 47 matches for the South Melbourne Cricket Club's First XI over 5 seasons (1909/10—1913/14); a batsman, who never bowled, he scored a total of 317 runs for South Melbourne, with an average of 11.74 (his highest score was 53). He toured New Zealand with the South Melbourne Cricket Club in 1912/13.

== Death ==
A retired coachbuilder, he died on 15 December 1952 at his home in Hawthorn, Victoria.
