= Alby Ingleman =

Australian rules footballer

Albert Ingleman

Personal information
- Full name: Albert Edward Ingleman
- Born: 9 May 1886; Brunswick, Victoria
- Died: 23 December 1970 (aged 84); Caulfield, Victoria
- Original team: Brunswick Juniors
- Position: Centreman

Playing career^{1}
| Years | Club | Games (Goals) |
| 1905–1908 | Carlton | 21 (2) |
- ^{1} Playing statistics correct to the end of 1908.

Albert Edward Ingleman (9 May 1886 – 23 December 1970) was an Australian rules footballer who played for Carlton in the Victorian Football League (VFL).

Ingleman, who was recruited from Brunswick, found it hard to get regular game time at Carlton in his preferred position in the centre. The man who often kept him out of the side, centreman Rod McGregor, broke his nose during the 1907 finals series which allowed Ingleman to make an appearance in the 1907 VFL Grand Final, which Carlton won.
