= Jim Cameron (Australian footballer) =

Australian rules footballer

Personal information
- Full name: John Alexander Cameron
- Born: 23 October 1881; Frankston, Victoria
- Died: 17 March 1941 (aged 59); Heidelberg, Victoria
- Original team: Frankston

Playing career^{1}
| Years | Club | Games (Goals) |
| 1903–1911 | South Melbourne | 117 (43) |
- ^{1} Playing statistics correct to the end of 1911.

John Alexander "Joker" Cameron (23 October 1881 – 17 March 1941) was an Australian rules footballer who played with South Melbourne in the Victorian Football League (VFL).

Cameron, who was originally from Frankston, played in a variety of role during his league career. He often appeared as a defender and follower, but was a half forward flanker in South Melbourne's 1909 premiership team. He also played in the 1907 VFL Grand Final, which South Melbourne lost.
