= Dick Doran (footballer) =

Australian rules footballer (1868–1912)

Personal information
- Full name: Richard Doran
- Nickname: Chopper
- Born: 22 March 1868; Melbourne, Victoria
- Died: 5 December 1912 (aged 44); Melbourne, Victoria

Playing career^{1}
Years	Club	Games (Goals)
1887–88	Port Melbourne (VFA)	
1888–95	South Melbourne (VFA)	
1895	Footscray (VFA)	
1896	Fremantle (WAFL)	
1897	South Melbourne	9 (0)
- ^{1} Playing statistics correct to the end of 1897.

Dick Doran (22 March 1868 – 5 December 1912) was an Australian rules footballer who played with South Melbourne in the Victorian Football League (VFL).
