= 1909 VFL season =

13th season of the Victorian Football League (VFL)

1909 VFL premiership season
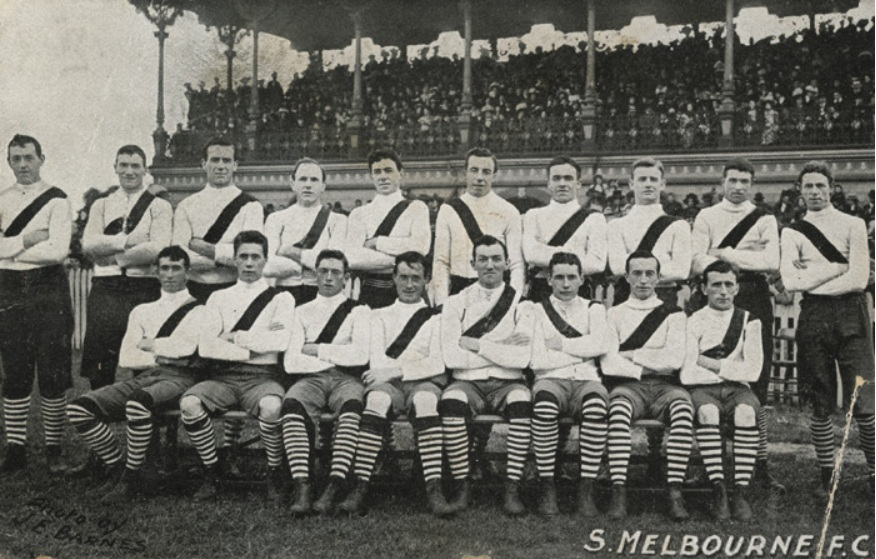
- South Melbourne 1909 VFL premiership team
- Date: 1 May – 2 October 1909
- Teams: 10
- Premiers: South Melbourne; 1st premiership
- Minor premiers: South Melbourne; 1st minor premiership
- Leading goalkicker medallist: Dick Lee (Collingwood); 58 goals
- Matches played: 94

The 1909 VFL season was the 13th season of the Victorian Football League (VFL), the highest-level senior Australian rules football competition in Victoria. The season featured ten clubs and ran from 1 May to 2 October, comprising an 18-match home-and-away season followed by a four-week finals series featuring the top four clubs.

South Melbourne won the premiership, defeating Carlton by two points in the 1909 VFL grand final; it was South Melbourne's first VFL premiership. South Melbourne also won the minor premiership by finishing atop the home-and-away ladder with a 14–4 win–loss record. Collingwood's Dick Lee won his third consecutive leading goalkicker medal as the league's leading goalkicker.

== Background ==
In 1909, the VFL competition consisted of ten teams of 18 on-the-field players each, with no reserves, although any of the 18 players who had left the playing field for any reason could later resume their place on the field at any time during the match.

Each team played each other twice in a home-and-away season of 18 rounds.

Once the 18 round home-and-away season had finished, the 1909 VFL premiers were determined by the specific format and conventions of the amended Argus system.

== Home-and-away season ==
=== Round 1 ===
Home team	Home team score	Away team	Away team score	Venue	Date
Geelong	6.8 (44)	South Melbourne	8.5 (53)	Corio Oval	1 May 1909
Essendon	6.18 (54)	St Kilda	6.8 (44)	EMCG	1 May 1909
Collingwood	9.7 (61)	Fitzroy	10.12 (72)	Victoria Park	1 May 1909
Carlton	3.14 (32)	University	6.11 (47)	Princes Park	1 May 1909
Richmond	9.9 (63)	Melbourne	11.8 (74)	Punt Road Oval	1 May 1909

=== Round 2 ===
Home team	Home team score	Away team	Away team score	Venue	Date
Fitzroy	12.16 (88)	Geelong	3.10 (28)	Brunswick Street Oval	8 May 1909
University	5.7 (37)	Richmond	6.6 (42)	EMCG	8 May 1909
Melbourne	7.5 (47)	Essendon	9.13 (67)	MCG	8 May 1909
St Kilda	3.5 (23)	Collingwood	3.11 (29)	Junction Oval	8 May 1909
South Melbourne	7.3 (45)	Carlton	4.4 (28)	Lake Oval	8 May 1909

=== Round 3 ===
Home team	Home team score	Away team	Away team score	Venue	Date
St Kilda	5.12 (42)	University	2.9 (21)	Junction Oval	15 May 1909
Essendon	8.18 (66)	Geelong	9.5 (59)	EMCG	15 May 1909
Carlton	7.8 (50)	Collingwood	4.9 (33)	Princes Park	15 May 1909
South Melbourne	12.16 (88)	Melbourne	3.6 (24)	Lake Oval	15 May 1909
Richmond	4.13 (37)	Fitzroy	9.14 (68)	Punt Road Oval	15 May 1909

=== Round 4 ===
Home team	Home team score	Away team	Away team score	Venue	Date
Melbourne	6.15 (51)	St Kilda	6.4 (40)	MCG	22 May 1909
Fitzroy	5.7 (37)	South Melbourne	11.10 (76)	Brunswick Street Oval	22 May 1909
Essendon	8.11 (59)	University	9.14 (68)	EMCG	22 May 1909
Collingwood	12.13 (85)	Richmond	7.7 (49)	Victoria Park	22 May 1909
Geelong	12.13 (85)	Carlton	8.13 (61)	Corio Oval	22 May 1909

=== Round 5 ===
Home team	Home team score	Away team	Away team score	Venue	Date
St Kilda	7.8 (50)	Richmond	11.4 (70)	Junction Oval	29 May 1909
University	9.9 (63)	Geelong	3.10 (28)	EMCG	29 May 1909
Fitzroy	5.7 (37)	Essendon	8.13 (61)	Brunswick Street Oval	29 May 1909
South Melbourne	6.10 (46)	Collingwood	3.8 (26)	Lake Oval	29 May 1909
Melbourne	8.9 (57)	Carlton	12.8 (80)	MCG	29 May 1909

=== Round 6 ===
Home team	Home team score	Away team	Away team score	Venue	Date
Richmond	10.11 (71)	South Melbourne	8.10 (58)	Punt Road Oval	5 June 1909
Geelong	6.12 (48)^{Note}	St Kilda	6.13 (49)	Corio Oval	5 June 1909
Collingwood	10.13 (73)	Essendon	4.7 (31)	Victoria Park	5 June 1909
Carlton	6.12 (48)	Fitzroy	5.9 (39)	Princes Park	5 June 1909
University	6.10 (46)	Melbourne	9.11 (65)	EMCG	5 June 1909

=== Round 7 ===
Home team	Home team score	Away team	Away team score	Venue	Date
Essendon	9.8 (62)	South Melbourne	9.9 (63)	EMCG	7 June 1909
Collingwood	8.17 (65)	University	4.5 (29)	Victoria Park	7 June 1909
Carlton	10.12 (72)	Richmond	6.7 (43)	Princes Park	7 June 1909
Melbourne	18.9 (117)	Geelong	5.8 (38)	MCG	7 June 1909
St Kilda	4.11 (35)	Fitzroy	11.10 (76)	Junction Oval	7 June 1909

=== Round 8 ===
Home team	Home team score	Away team	Away team score	Venue	Date
South Melbourne	11.15 (81)	University	2.6 (18)	Lake Oval	12 June 1909
Fitzroy	5.12 (42)	Melbourne	8.7 (55)	Brunswick Street Oval	12 June 1909
Essendon	8.7 (55)	Richmond	8.15 (63)	EMCG	12 June 1909
Geelong	5.10 (40)	Collingwood	10.8 (68)	Corio Oval	12 June 1909
St Kilda	5.10 (40)	Carlton	10.9 (69)	Junction Oval	12 June 1909

=== Round 9 ===
Home team	Home team score	Away team	Away team score	Venue	Date
Carlton	6.14 (50)	Essendon	4.9 (33)	Princes Park	19 June 1909
South Melbourne	14.13 (97)	St Kilda	2.8 (20)	Lake Oval	19 June 1909
Richmond	4.15 (39)	Geelong	5.7 (37)	Punt Road Oval	19 June 1909
University	8.20 (68)	Fitzroy	3.10 (28)	EMCG	26 June 1909
Melbourne	10.5 (65)	Collingwood	10.5 (65)	MCG	26 June 1909

=== Round 10 ===
Home team	Home team score	Away team	Away team score	Venue	Date
Melbourne	12.10 (82)	Richmond	2.3 (15)	MCG	3 July 1909
South Melbourne	17.9 (111)	Geelong	4.7 (31)	Lake Oval	3 July 1909
St Kilda	6.6 (42)	Essendon	9.18 (72)	Junction Oval	3 July 1909
Fitzroy	2.9 (21)	Collingwood	6.16 (52)	Brunswick Street Oval	3 July 1909
University	7.7 (49)	Carlton	10.9 (69)	EMCG	3 July 1909

=== Round 11 ===
Home team	Home team score	Away team	Away team score	Venue	Date
Richmond	7.8 (50)	University	11.15 (81)	Punt Road Oval	10 July 1909
Essendon	5.10 (40)	Melbourne	3.12 (30)	EMCG	10 July 1909
Collingwood	11.18 (84)	St Kilda	6.8 (44)	Victoria Park	10 July 1909
Carlton	9.14 (68)	South Melbourne	6.8 (44)	Princes Park	10 July 1909
Geelong	9.7 (61)	Fitzroy	13.9 (87)	Corio Oval	10 July 1909

=== Round 12 ===
Home team	Home team score	Away team	Away team score	Venue	Date
Melbourne	3.6 (24)	South Melbourne	6.9 (45)	MCG	17 July 1909
Fitzroy	9.14 (68)	Richmond	3.7 (25)	Brunswick Street Oval	17 July 1909
University	11.14 (80)	St Kilda	4.2 (26)	EMCG	17 July 1909
Geelong	6.9 (45)	Essendon	12.8 (80)	Corio Oval	17 July 1909
Collingwood	5.7 (37)	Carlton	5.6 (36)	Victoria Park	17 July 1909

=== Round 13 ===
Home team	Home team score	Away team	Away team score	Venue	Date
Carlton	19.16 (130)	Geelong	10.10 (70)	Princes Park	24 July 1909
St Kilda	5.11 (41)	Melbourne	12.7 (79)	Junction Oval	24 July 1909
South Melbourne	4.6 (30)	Fitzroy	5.14 (44)	Lake Oval	24 July 1909
University	4.19 (43)	Essendon	11.9 (75)	EMCG	24 July 1909
Richmond	5.7 (37)	Collingwood	8.24 (72)	Punt Road Oval	24 July 1909

=== Round 14 ===
Home team	Home team score	Away team	Away team score	Venue	Date
Richmond	9.11 (65)	St Kilda	6.13 (49)	Punt Road Oval	31 July 1909
Geelong	6.11 (47)	University	12.15 (87)	Corio Oval	31 July 1909
Essendon	10.9 (69)	Fitzroy	7.7 (49)	EMCG	31 July 1909
Collingwood	8.6 (54)	South Melbourne	6.7 (43)	Victoria Park	31 July 1909
Carlton	10.21 (81)	Melbourne	4.6 (30)	Princes Park	31 July 1909

=== Round 15 ===
Home team	Home team score	Away team	Away team score	Venue	Date
St Kilda	3.8 (26)	Geelong	2.10 (22)	Junction Oval	7 August 1909
Essendon	14.14 (98)	Collingwood	6.6 (42)	EMCG	7 August 1909
Melbourne	4.4 (28)	University	2.15 (27)	MCG	14 August 1909
South Melbourne	18.11 (119)	Richmond	3.8 (26)	Lake Oval	14 August 1909
Fitzroy	2.9 (21)	Carlton	11.6 (72)	Brunswick Street Oval	14 August 1909

=== Round 16 ===
Home team	Home team score	Away team	Away team score	Venue	Date
Geelong	6.9 (45)	Melbourne	9.14 (68)	Corio Oval	21 August 1909
Fitzroy	11.11 (77)	St Kilda	5.1 (31)	Brunswick Street Oval	21 August 1909
South Melbourne	6.5 (41)	Essendon	5.7 (37)	Lake Oval	21 August 1909
University	5.9 (39)	Collingwood	5.9 (39)	EMCG	21 August 1909
Richmond	9.6 (60)	Carlton	14.16 (100)	Punt Road Oval	21 August 1909

=== Round 17 ===
Home team	Home team score	Away team	Away team score	Venue	Date
Collingwood	11.11 (77)	Geelong	4.8 (32)	Victoria Park	28 August 1909
Carlton	11.13 (79)	St Kilda	5.3 (33)	Princes Park	28 August 1909
University	5.9 (39)	South Melbourne	9.11 (65)	EMCG	28 August 1909
Melbourne	9.7 (61)	Fitzroy	4.7 (31)	MCG	28 August 1909
Richmond	5.9 (39)	Essendon	12.11 (83)	Punt Road Oval	28 August 1909

=== Round 18 ===
Home team	Home team score	Away team	Away team score	Ground	Date
St Kilda	5.5 (35)	South Melbourne	7.15 (57)	Junction Oval	4 September 1909
Geelong	13.14 (92)	Richmond	4.7 (31)	Corio Oval	4 September 1909
Fitzroy	9.6 (60)	University	8.12 (60)	Brunswick Street Oval	4 September 1909
Collingwood	15.18 (108)	Melbourne	9.12 (66)	Victoria Park	4 September 1909
Essendon	4.10 (34)	Carlton	6.13 (49)	EMCG	4 September 1909

== Ladder ==
(P)	Premiers
	Qualified for finals

#	Team	P	W	L	D	PF	PA	%	Pts
1	South Melbourne (P)	18	14	4	0	1162	688	168.9	56
2	Carlton	18	14	4	0	1174	800	146.8	56
3	Collingwood	18	12	4	2	1070	821	130.3	52
4	Essendon	18	11	7	0	1076	884	121.7	44
5	Melbourne	18	10	7	1	1023	962	106.3	42
6	Fitzroy	18	8	9	1	945	930	101.6	34
7	University	18	7	9	2	902	901	100.1	32
8	Richmond	18	6	12	0	825	1282	64.4	24
9	Geelong	18	3	15	0	852	1301	65.5	12
10	St Kilda	18	2	16	0	670	1130	59.3	8

Rules for classification: 1. premiership points; 2. percentage; 3. points for
Average score: 53.9
Source: AFL Tables

== Finals series ==
All of the 1909 finals were played at the MCG so the home team in the semi-finals and Preliminary Final is purely the higher ranked team from the ladder but in the Grand Final the home team was the team that won the Preliminary Final.

=== Semi-finals ===
Home team	Score	Away team	Score	Venue	Date
Carlton	14.8 (92)	Essendon	9.2 (56)	MCG	11 September
South Melbourne	10.8 (68)	Collingwood	6.11 (47)	MCG	18 September

=== Preliminary final ===
Home team	Score	Away team	Score	Venue	Date
South Melbourne	7.5 (47)	Carlton	10.9 (69)	MCG	25 September

=== Grand final ===
Home team	Score	Away team	Score	Venue	Date
Carlton	4.12 (36)	South Melbourne	4.14 (38)	MCG	2 October

== Season notes ==
- In the second-round match against the University Football Club, badly concussed Richmond follower Bill Burns, who was about to leave for hospital, heard that Richmond was about to lose the match, returned to the field of play, took a mark, kicked the winning goal, and was carried off the ground on his teammates' shoulders. Later in 1909, Burns was suspended for life after being found guilty of a kicking charge; however, the sentence was later reduced on appeal.
- On 19 May 1909, the VFL Permit Committee considered the extraordinary application for a clearance to Carlton by South Melbourne footballer Bill Goddard. Although Goddard had played in all of South Melbourne's pre-season matches, South Melbourne readily agreed to clear him on the grounds that "he will not be selected in our team as we do not considered him good enough as a player". The application was made independently by Goddard, and unsolicited by Carlton, because Goddard "had seen a couple of the Carlton players who told him that he could get a game" and "[having seen] one of the committee, had decided to apply for a clearance". However, Carlton's secretary, Jack Worrall, informed the Committee that "This application has been made without the consent of my committee, and I further wish to state the committee do not desire the services of Mr. Goddard". The Permit Committee refused Goddard's application.
  - (Goddard transferred to Carlton in 1910, playing 13 senior games with Carlton, before transferring to St Kilda in 1911.)
- In Round 6, St Kilda defeated Geelong on the field by one point, but the game was awarded to Geelong on protest after it was established that Billy Stewart, who played for St Kilda in that match, was under suspension for a striking in match in Bendigo the previous week. St Kilda had been aware that Stewart was suspended, but its defence against playing him was procedural: that although Stewart's suspension had been handed down on 3 June, it had not been formally communicated to the VFL until 6 June, one day after the match; but the League found that the suspension was valid for the dates specified by the Bendigo Football Association, and it did not need to have been communicated to the League for it to reciprocally valid. This is the only such forfeiture to have lasted in senior VFL/AFL history (other such forfeits have temporarily occurred in the seniors, but were later reversed on appeal).
- In Round 7 against Geelong, Harry Brereton of Melbourne, in only his seventh game, became the first player to kick nine or more goals in a match since Jim McShane in 1899.
- A Round 8 match between Fitzroy and Melbourne was marred by numerous incidents of foul play. Spectators were involved in a large brawl at the end of the game.
- The Round 13 match between Carlton and Geelong saw the teams score an aggregate of 29.26 (200), the highest in VFL history to that time.
- There were riots in the crowd after the Round 13 match between South Melbourne and Fitzroy.
- An imminent on-field brawl between players from Collingwood and South Melbourne in their Round 14 match was averted when the appearance of a policeman on the ground calmed both teams down.
- The Round 15 match between St Kilda and Geelong is the last VFL/AFL game as of 2017 in which no goals were scored in the second half. On a flooded Junction Oval, St Kilda kicked 0.7 to Geelong's 0.5 after half time.
- University's draw with Collingwood in Round 16 was the closest that the Students got to defeating the Magpies in a League match. 13 of the University players were either medical students or doctors.
- A Collingwood spectator jumped the fence at the Round 18 match against Melbourne and punched a Melbourne player. Melbourne's Secretary, Mr. J.A. Harper, ran onto the field and made a citizens' arrest.
- The Argus newspaper published the height, weight and occupation of each player in the finals for the first time.

== Awards ==
- The VFL's leading goalkicker was Dick Lee of Collingwood with 58 goals.
- St Kilda took the wooden spoon in 1909.

== Sources ==
- 1909 VFL season at AFL Tables
- 1909 VFL season at Australian Football
