= George Topping =

Australian rules footballer and umpire

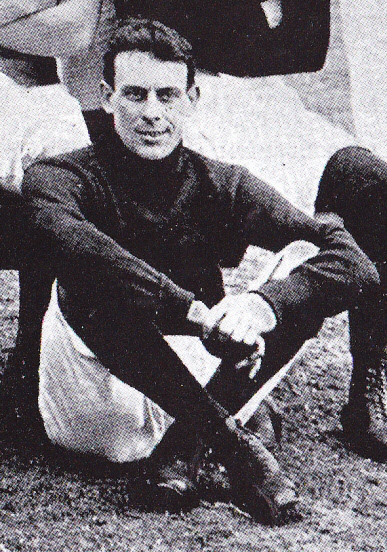
- Topping in 1908

Personal information
- Full name: George Thomas Dungate Topping
- Born: 27 August 1881; Fitzroy, Victoria
- Died: 17 November 1958 (aged 77); Brunswick, Victoria
- Original team: Carlton Juniors
- Debut: Round 10, 1902, Carlton vs. St Kilda, at Princes Park
- Height: 166 cm (5 ft 5 in)
- Weight: 61 kg (134 lb)

Playing career^{1}
| Years | Club | Games (Goals) |
| 1902–1916 | Carlton | 125 (153) |
- ^{1} Playing statistics correct to the end of 1916.

George Thomas Dungate Topping (27 August 1881 – 17 November 1958) was an Australian rules footballer and umpire in the Victorian Football League.

== Playing career ==
Originally recruited from Carlton Juniors, Topping made his debut for the Carlton Football Club in Round 10 of the 1902 season. Playing mainly in the forward line, he was a good marker and accurate kicker with a good sense of where to go to get the ball. His firepower was vital in Carlton's hat-trick of premierships from 1906 to 1908, with totals of 25, 26, and 16 goals in those respective seasons. The following year, the Blues were just beaten by South Melbourne in the grand final, but Topping had his best scoring year with a total of 36 goals and playing in every match.

The following seasons, the sides met in round four. It was a spiteful affair with fights erupting at regular intervals. Late in the final quarter, South Melbourne defender Bert Streckfuss was struck unconscious.

Field umpire, Lardie Tulloch promptly reported Topping, who was escorted from the ground by Carlton supporters who were either showing their support or for his own protection.

At the subsequent tribunal hearing, Topping admitted that he had lost his head and struck Streckfuss in retaliation for Streckfuss's previous elbowing of Andy McDonald. The tribunal took a dim view of the incident and suspended Topping for the remainder of the 1910 season and all of 1911.

There were further repercussions for both Topping and Streckfuss when they were called before the Carlton Court a fortnight later and charged with assault. Found guilty, the bench decided to set an example, and both were fined the maximum of £10, in default of three months imprisonment.

Topping returned for a single game in 1912, kicking Carlton's opening goal of the season and two more for the match. During the following week, he sustained an injury and was not selected for round 2. Still on crutches in May, he took no further part in the season.

Following an unsuccessful foray into umpiring, Topping rejoined the Blues for 1914, kicking three goals against Melbourne in round one. The next week against Geelong, he turned awkwardly after taking a mark and dislocated a bone in his ankle. He hobbled through the remainder of the game, but his season ended with the final siren.

Reappearing in round two of 1916 he kicked two goals, and the next week against Richmond, he scored his final goal in his 125th and last match.

== Umpiring career ==
Injured in 1912, Topping applied to become a field umpire with the VFL. He was accepted and placed on the senior list. Initially appointed to a number of country matches, his first VFL appointment was Fitzroy v. Essendon in round five. He became the 67th field umpire in VFL history. The match seems to have been well handled; The Argus was only critical of an advantage called back, costing Essendon a goal. The football record noted, 'He severely penalized anyone holding the ball when caught.'

In rounds seven and eight, played on Saturday and Monday – he umpired both Essendon matches with seemingly few issues, yet they were his final senior appointments. By July, he was reported as back at Carlton having not been a success in umpiring although the Football Record intimated Topping missed playing more than he expected, noting, "Topping has had a go at field umpiring, and has come to the conclusion that it is better to play than to see that the other fellows play the game according to Hoyle."

Seven years after his last match as a player, Topping again applied to join the VFL umpires and was again accepted. This time he stuck at it for longer and, despite not achieving senior matches, was more successful. His 15 VCFL matches in 1922 included two finals—the Heathcote grand final and the Peninsula Football Association second semi-final—and he returned the same total in 1923 with two more finals.

Two matches in 1924, a month apart, suggest the possibility of injury ending Topping's career with the whistle. His final totals were 3 VFL and 38 VCFL appointments.
