= Bill Kerr (footballer) =

Australian rules footballer

Personal information
- Full name: William Kerr
- Born: 1 September 1882; South Melbourne, Victoria
- Died: 16 February 1911 (aged 28); South Melbourne, Victoria
- Original team: Port Rovers

Playing career^{1}
Years	Club	Games (Goals)
1905	Essendon	1 (0)
1907	South Melbourne	15 (8)
Total		16 (8)
- ^{1} Playing statistics correct to the end of 1907.

Bill Kerr (1 September 1882 – 16 February 1911) was an Australian rules footballer who played with Essendon and South Melbourne in the Victorian Football League (VFL). He died from typhoid fever at the age of 28.

'Bubs' Kerr also played 22 games and kicked 16 goals for Williamstown in the VFA in 1906 and 1910, the last season before he died.
