= Dick Casey =

Australian rules footballer (c.1881–1919)

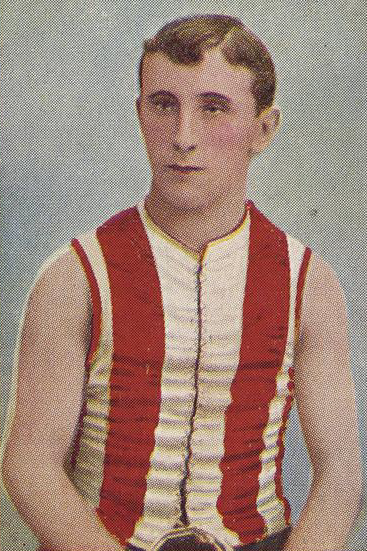
- Cigarette card of Casey in 1905

Personal information
- Full name: Richard James Casey
- Born: c.1881
- Died: 16 April 1919 (aged 37–38); South Melbourne, Victoria
- Original team: Brunswick
- Height: 168 cm (5 ft 6 in)
- Weight: 58 kg (128 lb)

Playing career^{1}
Years	Club	Games (Goals)
1899–1904	Brunswick (VFA)	67 (12)
1905–1912	South Melbourne	112 (93)
1913	City (NTFA)	
1914	Footscray (VFA)	1 (0)
- ^{1} Playing statistics correct to the end of 1914.

Richard James Casey (c. 1881 – 16 April 1919) was an Australian rules footballer who played with South Melbourne in the Victorian Football League (VFL).

Casey, who was noted for his small build and overly aggressive playing style, was recruited from Brunswick. A forward, he was South Melbourne's second leading goal-kicker in 1907, when he kicked a career high 23 goals. He appeared in two grand finals for South Melbourne; their 1907 and 1912 losses, but missed out on a spot in the 1909 premiership team through injury.

At the end of the round five match of the 1907 VFL season, Casey struck a 16-year-old spectator and rendered him unconscious for 15 minutes. He was later found guilty of assault and fined £3 In round four of the 1910 VFL season, Casey was reported for striking George Topping, in retaliation for the Carlton player's king hit on Casey's teammate Bert Streckfuss. He received a 16-week suspension, meaning that he missed the rest of the year and the start of the 1911 season.

He coached Launceston club City in 1913 and also played some football for Footscray in the Victorian Football Association.

Casey died young, in 1919, a victim of the influenza pandemic.
