= 1907 VFL season =

Eleventh season of the Victorian Football League (VFL)

1907 VFL premiership season
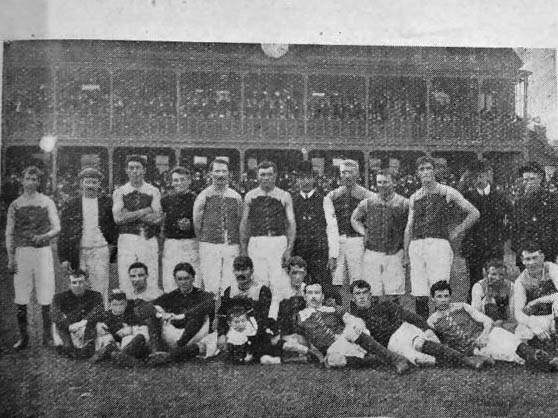
- Carlton 1907 VFL premiership team
- Date: 27 April – 21 September 1907
- Teams: 8
- Premiers: Carlton; 2nd premiership
- Minor premiers: Carlton; 2nd minor premiership
- Leading goalkicker medallist: Dick Lee (Collingwood); 47 goals
- Matches played: 71

The 1907 VFL season was the eleventh season of the Victorian Football League (VFL), the highest-level senior Australian rules football competition in Victoria. The season featured eight clubs and ran from 27 April to 21 September, comprising a 17-match home-and-away season followed by a three-week finals series featuring the top four clubs.

Carlton won the premiership, defeating South Melbourne by five points in the 1907 VFL grand final; it was Carlton's second (consecutive and overall) VFL premiership. Carlton also won its second consecutive minor premiership by finishing atop the home-and-away ladder with a 13–4 win–loss record. Collingwood's Dick Lee won the leading goalkicker medal as the league's leading goalkicker.

== Background ==
In 1907, the VFL competition consisted of eight teams of 18 on-the-field players each, with no "reserves", although any of the 18 players who had left the playing field for any reason could later resume their place on the field at any time during the match.

Each team played each other twice in a home-and-away season of 14 rounds. Then, based on ladder positions after those 14 rounds, three further 'sectional rounds' were played, with the teams ranked 1st, 3rd, 5th and 7th playing in one section and the teams ranked 2nd, 4th, 6th and 8th playing in the other.

Once the 17 round home-and-away season had finished, the 1907 VFL Premiers were determined by the specific format and conventions of the amended "Argus system".

== Home-and-away season ==
=== Round 1 ===
Home team	Home team score	Away team	Away team score	Venue	Date
Essendon	14.15 (99)	Geelong	9.2 (56)	EMCG	27 April 1907
Collingwood	6.11 (47)	Fitzroy	5.9 (39)	Victoria Park	27 April 1907
Carlton	4.6 (30)	St Kilda	8.8 (56)	Princes Park	27 April 1907
South Melbourne	6.5 (41)	Melbourne	9.6 (60)	Lake Oval	27 April 1907

=== Round 2 ===
Home team	Home team score	Away team	Away team score	Venue	Date
Fitzroy	7.15 (57)	South Melbourne	7.5 (47)	Brunswick Street Oval	4 May 1907
Melbourne	5.11 (41)	Essendon	6.12 (48)	MCG	4 May 1907
St Kilda	8.14 (62)	Collingwood	8.6 (54)	Junction Oval	4 May 1907
Geelong	3.9 (27)	Carlton	8.14 (62)	Corio Oval	4 May 1907

=== Round 3 ===
Home team	Home team score	Away team	Away team score	Venue	Date
Fitzroy	9.10 (64)	Geelong	12.5 (77)	Brunswick Street Oval	11 May 1907
St Kilda	9.13 (67)	Essendon	5.7 (37)	Junction Oval	11 May 1907
South Melbourne	9.12 (66)	Collingwood	5.8 (38)	Lake Oval	11 May 1907
Melbourne	7.5 (47)	Carlton	12.14 (86)	MCG	11 May 1907

=== Round 4 ===
Home team	Home team score	Away team	Away team score	Venue	Date
Geelong	7.4 (46)	St Kilda	11.16 (82)	Corio Oval	18 May 1907
Essendon	6.8 (44)	South Melbourne	6.11 (47)	EMCG	18 May 1907
Collingwood	4.10 (34)	Melbourne	6.10 (46)	Victoria Park	18 May 1907
Carlton	10.17 (77)	Fitzroy	3.7 (25)	Princes Park	18 May 1907

=== Round 5 ===
Home team	Home team score	Away team	Away team score	Venue	Date
Geelong	9.5 (59)	Melbourne	7.9 (51)	Corio Oval	25 May 1907
Carlton	5.16 (46)	South Melbourne	9.7 (61)	Princes Park	25 May 1907
St Kilda	13.9 (87)	Fitzroy	9.10 (64)	Junction Oval	25 May 1907
Essendon	5.8 (38)	Collingwood	6.11 (47)	EMCG	25 May 1907

=== Round 6 ===
Home team	Home team score	Away team	Away team score	Venue	Date
Melbourne	7.9 (51)	St Kilda	15.18 (108)	MCG	1 June 1907
Collingwood	4.6 (30)	Carlton	4.17 (41)	Victoria Park	1 June 1907
South Melbourne	6.9 (45)	Geelong	4.9 (33)	Lake Oval	3 June 1907
Fitzroy	10.7 (67)	Essendon	4.12 (36)	Brunswick Street Oval	3 June 1907

=== Round 7 ===
Home team	Home team score	Away team	Away team score	Venue	Date
St Kilda	4.8 (32)	South Melbourne	7.2 (44)	Junction Oval	15 June 1907
Carlton	15.14 (104)	Essendon	7.8 (50)	Princes Park	15 June 1907
Melbourne	8.7 (55)	Fitzroy	6.11 (47)	MCG	15 June 1907
Geelong	3.14 (32)	Collingwood	5.8 (38)	Corio Oval	15 June 1907

=== Round 8 ===
Home team	Home team score	Away team	Away team score	Venue	Date
Melbourne	7.10 (52)	South Melbourne	5.10 (40)	MCG	22 June 1907
Geelong	7.11 (53)	Essendon	3.10 (28)	Corio Oval	22 June 1907
Fitzroy	11.3 (69)	Collingwood	11.12 (78)	Brunswick Street Oval	22 June 1907
St Kilda	3.15 (33)	Carlton	8.14 (62)	Junction Oval	22 June 1907

=== Round 9 ===
Home team	Home team score	Away team	Away team score	Venue	Date
Essendon	5.13 (43)	Melbourne	3.10 (28)	EMCG	29 June 1907
Collingwood	9.13 (67)	St Kilda	7.10 (52)	Victoria Park	29 June 1907
Carlton	5.9 (39)	Geelong	7.4 (46)	Princes Park	29 June 1907
South Melbourne	6.8 (44)	Fitzroy	7.10 (52)	Lake Oval	29 June 1907

=== Round 10 ===
Home team	Home team score	Away team	Away team score	Venue	Date
Essendon	5.7 (37)	St Kilda	9.11 (65)	EMCG	6 July 1907
Collingwood	8.9 (57)	South Melbourne	7.8 (50)	Victoria Park	6 July 1907
Carlton	9.16 (70)	Melbourne	8.6 (54)	Princes Park	6 July 1907
Geelong	10.11 (71)	Fitzroy	4.8 (32)	Corio Oval	6 July 1907

=== Round 11 ===
Home team	Home team score	Away team	Away team score	Venue	Date
St Kilda	6.18 (54)	Geelong	9.5 (59)	Junction Oval	13 July 1907
South Melbourne	8.11 (59)	Essendon	6.11 (47)	Lake Oval	13 July 1907
Melbourne	2.10 (22)	Collingwood	15.11 (101)	MCG	13 July 1907
Fitzroy	3.8 (26)	Carlton	15.14 (104)	Brunswick Street Oval	13 July 1907

=== Round 12 ===
Home team	Home team score	Away team	Away team score	Venue	Date
Fitzroy	3.7 (25)	St Kilda	3.5 (23)	Brunswick Street Oval	20 July 1907
Collingwood	10.10 (70)	Essendon	3.5 (23)	Victoria Park	20 July 1907
Melbourne	6.13 (49)	Geelong	4.10 (34)	MCG	20 July 1907
South Melbourne	3.9 (27)	Carlton	4.12 (36)	Lake Oval	20 July 1907

=== Round 13 ===
Home team	Home team score	Away team	Away team score	Venue	Date
Geelong	6.6 (42)	South Melbourne	7.8 (50)	Corio Oval	3 August 1907
Essendon	8.10 (58)	Fitzroy	3.13 (31)	EMCG	3 August 1907
Carlton	5.15 (45)	Collingwood	5.4 (34)	Princes Park	3 August 1907
St Kilda	4.6 (30)	Melbourne	7.5 (47)	Junction Oval	3 August 1907

=== Round 14 ===
Home team	Home team score	Away team	Away team score	Venue	Date
Fitzroy	5.9 (39)	Melbourne	6.19 (55)	Brunswick Street Oval	10 August 1907
Collingwood	15.6 (96)	Geelong	8.9 (57)	Victoria Park	10 August 1907
South Melbourne	8.16 (64)	St Kilda	5.14 (44)	Lake Oval	10 August 1907
Essendon	3.7 (25)	Carlton	10.18 (78)	EMCG	10 August 1907

=== Pre-sectional ladder ===
Section A
Section B

#	Team	P	W	L	D	PF	PA	%	Pts
1	Carlton	14	11	3	0	880	541	162.7	44
2	Collingwood	14	9	5	0	791	642	123.2	36
3	South Melbourne	14	8	6	0	685	640	107.0	32
4	St Kilda	14	7	7	0	795	687	115.7	28
5	Melbourne	14	7	7	0	658	780	84.4	28
6	Geelong	14	6	8	0	692	789	87.7	24
7	Essendon	14	4	10	0	613	813	75.4	16
8	Fitzroy	14	4	10	0	637	859	74.2	16

Rules for classification: 1. premiership points; 2. percentage; 3. points for
Source: AFL Tables

=== Round 15 (Sectional round 1) ===
	Round 15 (Sectional round 1)
Saturday, 17 August	South Melbourne 8.9 (57)	def.	Carlton 4.16 (40)	Lake Oval
Saturday, 17 August	St Kilda 8.19 (67)	def.	Collingwood 3.8 (26)	Junction Oval
Saturday, 17 August	Essendon 10.11 (71)	def.	Melbourne 8.8 (56)	East Melbourne Cricket Ground
Saturday, 17 August	Fitzroy 12.16 (88)	def.	Geelong 5.8 (38)	Brunswick Street Oval

=== Round 16 (Sectional round 2) ===
	Round 16 (Sectional round 2)
Saturday, 24 August	Carlton 11.12 (78)	def.	Essendon 7.5 (47)	Princes Park
Saturday, 24 August	Collingwood 11.16 (82)	def. by	Fitzroy 15.4 (94)	Victoria Park
Saturday, 24 August	Geelong 5.8 (38)	def. by	St Kilda 4.17 (41)	Corio Oval
Saturday, 24 August	Melbourne 7.8 (50)	def. by	South Melbourne 10.14 (74)	Melbourne Cricket Ground

=== Round 17 (Sectional round 3) ===
	Round 17 (Sectional round 3)
Saturday, 31 August	Carlton 9.8 (62)	def.	Melbourne 4.12 (36)	Princes Park
Saturday, 31 August	Collingwood 9.17 (71)	def. by	Geelong 12.4 (76)	Victoria Park
Saturday, 31 August	Essendon 6.7 (43)	def. by	South Melbourne 15.9 (99)	East Melbourne Cricket Ground
Saturday, 31 August	St Kilda 3.14 (32)	def. by	Fitzroy 6.9 (45)	Junction Oval

== Ladder ==
(P)	Premiers
	Qualified for finals

#	Team	P	W	L	D	PF	PA	%	Pts
1	Carlton (P)	17	13	4	0	1060	681	155.7	52
2	South Melbourne	17	11	6	0	915	773	118.4	44
3	St Kilda	17	9	8	0	935	796	117.5	36
4	Collingwood	17	9	8	0	970	879	110.4	36
5	Fitzroy	17	7	10	0	864	1011	85.5	28
6	Geelong	17	7	10	0	844	989	85.3	28
7	Melbourne	17	7	10	0	800	987	81.1	28
8	Essendon	17	5	12	0	774	1046	74.0	20

Rules for classification: 1. premiership points; 2. percentage; 3. points for
Average score: 52.7
Source: AFL Tables

== Finals series ==
=== Semi-finals ===
Home team	Home team score	Away team	Away team score	Venue	Date	
South Melbourne	12.10 (82)	Collingwood	6.12 (48)	MCG	07 September 1907	Attendance: 28,856
Carlton	13.13 (91)	St Kilda	4.11 (35)	MCG	14 September 1907	Attendance: 25,531

=== Grand final ===
Team	1 Qtr	2 Qtr	3 Qtr	Final
Carlton	1.4	4.6	6.10	6.14 (50)
South Melbourne	1.3	3.5	4.7	6.9 (45)

== Season notes ==
- In November 1906, the VFL was a founding member of the Australasian Football Council, which served as the new national administrative body governing the sport.
- The rules concerning kick-ins were amended, such that if the full back crossed outside the goal square before kicking the ball, a ball-up would be called on the top of the goal square. Previously, the full-back was given a second opportunity to kick legally, before a free kick would be awarded.
- Due to the special football train arriving late, the start of the round 3 match between Fitzroy and Geelong at Brunswick Street Oval was delayed by twenty minutes.
- In round 6, St Kilda defeated Melbourne 15.18 (108) to 7.9 (51); it was the first time in the club's 173 VFL matches to that point that St Kilda had scored 100 points or more.
- The VFL played two representative matches on Saturday 8 June, in the week between rounds 6 and 7: on the Melbourne Cricket Ground, the VFL 25.20 (170) defeated the Ballarat Football Association 3.7 (25); and at Bendigo, the VFL 14.10 (94) defeated the Bendigo Football League 7.11 (53). The VFL also played a return match against the Ballarat Association on the Ballarat City Oval on Saturday 27 July, the week between Rounds 12 and 13; in a rain-affected game, the VFL 8.4 (52) defeated Ballarat 3.7 (25).
- In round 8, Fitzroy kicked eleven goals without a behind against Collingwood, before three misses in the last quarter. They did not score in the second and third quarters after kicking 7.0 (42) in the first quarter.
- In round 11, Geelong defeated St Kilda despite having ten fewer scoring shots; before this, no VFL team had won with a deficit in scoring shots greater than eight. They repeated the feat of winning with ten fewer shots against Collingwood in the last round.
- During that last match, Collingwood lost to Geelong despite being 38 points ahead at three quarter time; this record was not beaten until 1936.
- Owing to rough play – and, in some observers' opinions, an over-correction after no players were reported in the particularly rough round 14 match between South Melbourne and St Kilda – eight players were reported during the matches in Sectional Round 1: three by the matches' central umpires, and five (all in the Carlton vs South Melbourne match) by the club delegates. The VFL Investigation Committee took three full evenings to complete the hearings, with Friday evening's session forced to run until almost 5am to complete it in time for Saturday's matches. Seven of the eight reported players were suspended, most notably South Melbourne's Billy Gent who was disqualified for life. The four suspensions from the Carlton vs South Melbourne match – Fred Elliott, Jim Marchbank, Bert Franks and Billy Gent – were later overturned on procedural grounds in May 1908, after it was determined that the historical VFL practice of players being reported by club delegates was not allowed under the Australasian Football Council rules which the VFL had adopted in 1907.
- The playing surface in each of the season's semi-finals that had been played on the Melbourne Cricket Ground (South Melbourne vs Collingwood, and Carlton vs St Kilda) had been so rock hard and dusty that the two match winners demanded that the MCG be watered before the next Saturday, unless there was substantial rain. The VFL acquiesced to this request, and the ground was watered; the ensuing premiership final, which Carlton won by five points, was on significantly softer ground.
- In the 1907 pre-season, then VFA team Richmond played a practice match against VFL team Geelong at Corio Oval, in direct defiance of a VFA edict. On 22 October 1907, Richmond, who had become quite dissatisfied with the VFA, applied to join the VFL: their application was unanimously accepted at a meeting five days later, and Richmond competed for the first time in the 1908 VFL season.
- St Kilda qualified for its first VFL finals appearance.

== Awards ==
- The 1907 VFL Premiership team was Carlton.
- The VFL's leading goalkicker was Dick Lee of Collingwood with 47 goals.
- Essendon took the "wooden spoon" in 1907.

== Sources ==
- 1907 VFL season at AFL Tables
- 1907 VFL season at Australian Football
