= Bert Atkins =

Australian rules footballer

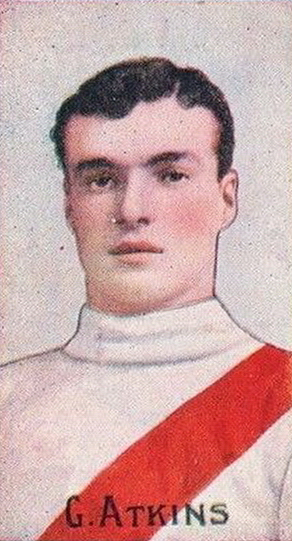
- Cigarette card of Atkins in 1909

Personal information
- Full name: George Bertram Atkins
- Born: 17 January 1885; Hobart, Tasmania
- Died: 27 February 1946 (aged 61); Sebastopol, Victoria
- Original team: Northcote (VFA)
- Height: 180 cm (5 ft 11 in)
- Weight: 76 kg (168 lb)

Playing career^{1}
Years	Club	Games (Goals)
1907–1908	South Melbourne	32 (0)
1918–1919	St Kilda	7 (1)
Total		39 (1)
- ^{1} Playing statistics correct to the end of 1919.

George Bertram Atkins (17 January 1885 – 27 February 1946) was an Australian rules footballer who played for the South Melbourne Football Club and St Kilda Football Club in the Victorian Football League (VFL).
