= George S. Johnson =

Australian rules footballer

George 'Mallee' Johnson
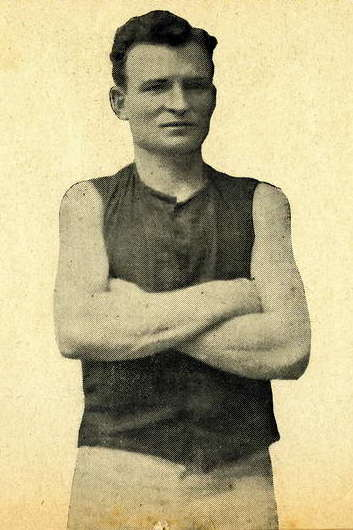
- Johnson in 1910

Personal information
- Full name: George Sidney Johnson
- Born: 31 May 1879; Fitzroy, Victoria
- Died: 5 September 1948 (aged 69); Melbourne, Victoria
- Original team: Richmond (VFA)
- Debut: Round 1, 6 May 1905, Carlton vs. Essendon, at Princes Park
- Height: 179 cm (5 ft 10 in)
- Weight: 80 kg (176 lb)

Playing career^{1}
Years	Club	Games (Goals)
1905–1909	Carlton	90 (29)
- ^{1} Playing statistics correct to the end of 1909.

Career highlights
- Richmond (VFA) Premiership Player 1902; Carlton Premiership Player 1906, 1907, 1908; Interstate Games:- 4; North Melbourne (VFA) Premiership Player 1910

George Sidney "Mallee" Johnson (31 May 1879 – 5 September 1948) was an Australian rules footballer who played for the Carlton Football Club in the VFL between 1905 and 1909.

== Career ==
Commencing at Richmond in the VFA in 1901, 'Mallee' Johnson became "a folk hero to the club ... the first of the super-heroes". By 1902 he was the dominant big man in the competition and an integral part of Richmond winning their first premiership.

He left Punt Road for the VFL prior to the 1905 season and in his five seasons at Carlton the team played in the finals every year, winning the premiership in 1906, 1907 and 1908. Johnson represented the VFL at the 1908 Melbourne Carnival.

When legendary Carlton coach Jack Worrall was pressured into resigning in 1909, Johnson was one of the players who chose to leave the club at the end of the season. He went back to the VFA and played in North Melbourne's 1910 premiership side and later with Melbourne City, where he was the inaugural captain, and Prahran.
