= Billy Gent =

Australian rules footballer

Personal information
- Full name: William Robert Gent
- Born: 19 June 1879; Richmond, Victoria
- Died: 7 July 1957 (aged 78); Port Melbourne, Victoria
- Original team: Essendon Association
- Height: 164 cm (5 ft 5 in)
- Weight: 62 kg (137 lb)
- Position: Rover

Playing career^{1}
Years	Club	Games (Goals)
1903–04, 1906–08	South Melbourne	62 (31)
- ^{1} Playing statistics correct to the end of 1908.

William Robert Gent (19 June 1879 – 7 July 1957) was an Australian rules footballer who played for South Melbourne in the Victorian Football League (VFL).

A rover from Essendon Association, Gent was noted for his bad behaviour on the field. In 1904 he received a 20-game suspension for striking numerous Fitzroy players, while in 1907 he was suspended for life by the league for striking Carlton's Dick L. Harris. His expulsion was lifted on appeal after seven games when it was ruled to be illegal – he had been reported by the Carlton club secretary, rather than by the game's umpire, which was traditionally allowed under VFL rules but turned out no longer to be allowed under the Australasian Football Council rules which had come into effect in 1907. Gent played four more games after return before retiring.
