= Bert Franks =

Australian rules footballer (1880–1951)

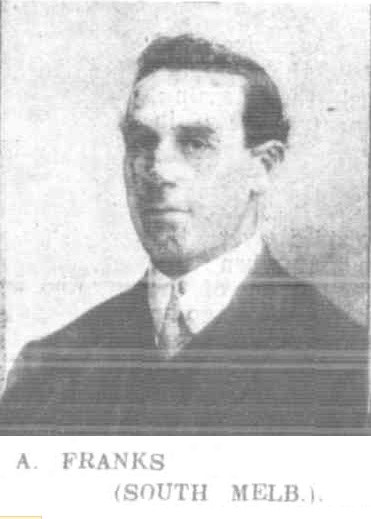
- Franks in 1907

Personal information
- Full name: Albert William Franks
- Born: 11 March 1880; Costerfield, Victoria
- Died: 14 September 1951 (aged 71); Fitzroy, Victoria
- Height: 180 cm (5 ft 11 in)
- Weight: 92 kg (203 lb)

Playing career^{1}
Years	Club	Games (Goals)
1906–10, 1912–13	South Melbourne (VFL)	99 (63)
1914–15, 1918–19	North Melbourne (VFA)	42 (18)
- ^{1} Playing statistics correct to the end of 1913.

Albert William "Gunga" Franks (11 March 1880 – 14 September 1951) was an Australian rules footballer who played for South Melbourne in the Victorian Football League (VFL).

== Family ==
The son of Nicholas Franks, and Adeline Ann Franks (?–1919), Albert William Franks was born at Costerfield, Victoria on 11 March 1880.

He married Lillian Amelia Powell (1889–1979).

== Football ==
Franks was one of the greatest footballers in Australia. … He was a big man with an amazing turn of speed and cat-like agility. He was a safe mark, and his drop-kicks, for long distance and accuracy, have seldom if ever, been excelled. … During his career with South Melbourne, Franks was reckoned to be the best follower in the League. He was equally good on the centre half-back or centre half-forward lines. … His only blemish as a footballer was a hot temper. That was attributed largely to a disability which he suffered through an accident shortly after his return from Western Australia. While employed at the [Abbotsford] brewery he was struck by a falling obstacle and knocked on to a furnace. His back was so badly burnt that for some time afterwards it had to be thickly padded when he played football, and when he received hard knocks on the back he often showed resentment.

=== Western Australia ===
Although born and bred in Victoria, Franks played initially in the Goldfields Football Association with Kalgoorlie Railways and then at North Fremantle in the Western Australian Football Association.

Usually playing as a ruckman, he was a vital member of South Melbourne's 1909 premiership team and kicked a goal in the low scoring Grand Final. He made another Grand Final in 1912, but on that occasion finished on the losing side and finished his career in the Victorian Football Association at North Melbourne.

=== VFL Tribunal (1907) ===
Franks had a poor disciplinary record, and missed the 1907 Grand Final due to suspension he received for striking Carlton's Doug Gillespie. The suspension was to have run until June 1908, but was lifted two weeks early when it was ruled to be illegal – he had been reported by the Carlton club secretary, rather than by the game's umpire, which was traditionally allowed under VFL rules but turned out no longer to be allowed under the Australasian Football Council rules which had come into effect in 1907. Gent played four more games after return before retiring.

=== VFL Tribunal (1910) ===
Following an extremely rough match (in which spectators invaded the ground and took part in the all-in melee between players and officials) between South Melbourne and Carlton on 28 May 1910, the field umpire, Lawrence Tulloch, reported the South Melbourne half-forward flanker Dick Casey for charging and striking the much taller Carlton player Jim Marchbank.

Because Marchbank could not attend the VFL tribunal's Wednesday, 1 June 1910 hearing, the tribunal reconvened on the evening of Saturday, 4 June 1910 in order to hear Marchbank's evidence. Controversially, the tribunal found Casey guilty, and Casey was suspended for the remainder of the 1910 season.

Franks was in the unruly crowd on several hundred that gathered outside the Block Arcade, in Collins Street, where the tribunal's hearing was conducted, to hear the outcome of Casey's hearing. As Tulloch left the building, Franks abused Tulloch, kicked him in the ankle and, as Tulloch returned to the building for safety, Franks followed him inside.

There was some uncertainty about whether the VFL could act against Franks in what appeared to be a matter for the law courts, and, if so, what form that action might take. On hearing a wide range of views, and after an hour's deliberation the VFL decided that it did have the power to deal with such a case.

After about an hour Franks was recalled, and the chairman said:-

The league has given this matter long and serious consideration. We are satisfied that the league has full power to deal with a case such as this. The result of our deliberation is that
"The league finds that Mr. Franks was guilty of an act contrary to the interests of the league and of football in using insulting language to Umpire Tulloch, and will report this decision to the permit and umpire committee, with a view to its taking action under regulation 12."

Regulation 12 reads:-

"Should the permit and umpire committee decide at any time that any player of any club represented on the league should not be permitted to play with such club, the said club, on receiving notice from the secretary, shall discontinue to play such player in its matches until such notice is withdrawn by the permit and umpire committee. Should a club continue to play such player after receiving such notice, it shall be dealt with as the league may think fit."

The permit and umpire committee met subsequently, and received the instruction from the League. It was decided to instruct the South Melbourne Club not to play A. Franks until further notice.

Found guilty of the charge of "insult and assault" lodged by Tulloch, and due to the ambiguity of the VFL's decision, Franks was (apparently) suspended for life – the matter was soon clarified, and the VFL specified the penalty as 33 matches — the longest suspension for such a charge in the league's history.

=== North Melbourne (VFA) ===
At the age of 34, he was cleared from South Melbourne to the VFA team North Melbourne, and played his first match, against Brighton, on 18 April 1914.

He played in 42 matches in four seasons, over six years (1914–1919).

He played his last match for North Melbourne, against Brighton on 28 June 1919, his only match for the season (having played in the victorious Grand Final team, at centre half-back, the year before), at the age of 39.

== Death ==
He died on 14 September 1951, in Fitzroy, Victoria. At the time of his death he was the publican at the Golden Fleece Hotel, on the corner of Russell Street and Little Bourke Street, Melbourne.

== See also ==
- 1908 Melbourne Carnival
