= Lardie Tulloch =

Australian rules footballer and umpire

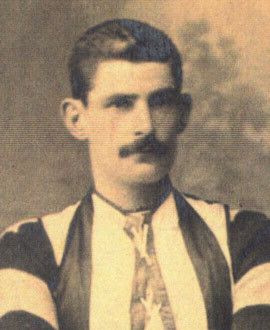
- Tulloch during his Collingwood career

Personal information
- Full name: Lawrence Gideon Tulloch
- Born: 15 April 1871
- Died: 13 September 1955 (aged 84)
- Original team: Carlton Juniors

Playing career^{1}
Years	Club	Games (Goals)
1897–1904	Collingwood	129 (67)
- ^{1} Playing statistics correct to the end of 1904.

Career highlights
- 2× VFL premiership player: 1902, 1903; Collingwood captain: 1902–1904

Lawrence Gideon "Lardie" Tulloch (15 April 1871 – 13 September 1955) was an Australian rules footballer who played for the Collingwood Football Club in the early years of the Victorian Football League (VFL).

Tulloch was born in Melbourne, the son of Daniel Tulloch and Elizabeth Trethway. Tulloch was a member of the Collingwood side which played in the inaugural VFL season, in 1897. A versatile player who was used at all ends of the ground, Tulloch was appointed Collingwood captain in 1902 and led Collingwood to the premiership that season, putting his name into history as the club's first ever VFL premiership winning captain. Another premiership followed the subsequent season and he remained captain for 1904, which was his final league season.

Following his retirement as a footballer, Tulloch served as a VFL umpire, officiating in 64 matches, including the 1907 VFL Grand Final. Tulloch remains the only person in VFL/AFL history to have captained a premiership team and umpired a Grand Final.

In 1908 Tulloch was assaulted after a match which he had umpired between Melbourne and Geelong. Later that season police struggled to protect Tulloch when he was mobbed by angry fans after a match between Carlton and St Kilda.

Tulloch married Sarah Caroline Marshall (1872–1961) in Carlton, Victoria on 24 September 1903. He died in Carlton, Victoria in 1955.

== Sources ==
- Atkinson, G. (1982) Everything you ever wanted to know about Australian rules football but couldn't be bothered asking, The Five Mile Press: Melbourne. ISBN 0 86788 009 0.
