= Fred Elliott (footballer) =

Australian rules footballer and coach

Frederick Clifford Elliott
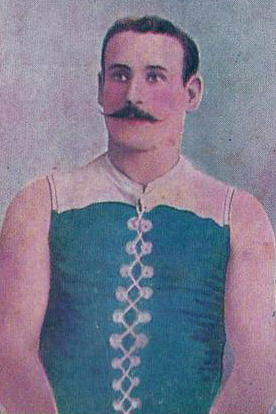
- Cigarette card of Elliott in 1905

Personal information
- Full name: Frederick Clifford Elliott
- Nickname: Pompey
- Born: 7 April 1879; Carlton, Victoria
- Died: 3 August 1960 (aged 81); Mount Gambier, South Australia
- Original team: Melbourne Football Club
- Height: 177 cm (5 ft 10 in)
- Weight: 82 kg (181 lb)
- Position: Follower

Playing career^{1}
Years	Club	Games (Goals)
1899	Melbourne (VFL)	12 (4)
1900–01	Carlton (VFL)	34 (7)
1902	North Fremantle (WAFA)	-- (-)
1903–11	Carlton (VFL)	163 (79)
1912	Footscray (VFA)	1 (0)
Total		210 (90)

Coaching career^{3}
Years	Club	Games (W–L–D)
1909–1911	Carlton	47 (34–11–2)
- ^{1} Playing statistics correct to the end of 1911.^{3} Coaching statistics correct as of 1911.

Career highlights
- Carlton premiership player (1906, 1908)

Frederick Clifford "Pompey" Elliott (7 April 1879 – 3 August 1960) was an Australian rules footballer in the Victorian Football League (VFL).

Fred was the first VFL player to reach 200 games and was elected to the Carlton Hall of Fame in 1988.

== Family ==
Fred was born in Carlton with the name Frederick Clifford Saggers to William Constantine Saggers (1824–1880) and Florence Mary Woodliffe Willcox (1857–1929), who had married in 1876.

He was only a few months old when his 56-year-old father died. Fred's mother was only 23 years old at the time and quickly re-married. The new husband's name was Frederick Giddons Anson Elliott (1859–1920). Baby Fred was given his stepfather's surname.

He married Florence May Windsor (1879–1959) at St Thomas's Essendon on 26 September 1906. The newly married couple went to live at 1 Pascoe Vale Road, Moonee Ponds. This was the City of Essendon's Town Hall and Library with an attached residence. Fred and Florence were able to reside there because Florence's mother, Sarah Windsor, was the librarian. Florence and Frederick went on to have four daughters, and all were born at 1 Pascoe Vale Road.

== Football ==
=== Melbourne (VFL) ===
He made his VFL debut for Melbourne against St Kilda on 13 May 1899.

=== Carlton (VFL) ===
Elliott made his debut for the Carlton Football Club in round 1 of the 1900 season. He had previously spent a year playing with Melbourne.

=== North Fremantle (WAFA) ===
He played for North Fremantle for the 1902 season, its second season in the Western Australian Football Association competition. North Fremantle was runner-up to East Fremantle in the 1902 WAFA season. At the club's end-of-season dinner, Elliott was presented with a silver cup.

=== Carlton (VFL) ===
Cleared from North Fremantle on 29 April 1903, he returned to Carlton.

He was named as Carlton's captain for the 1908 season, and he became captain-coach when Jack Worrall resigned midway through 1909. Elliott retired from the game after the 1911 season as the first player to reach 200 VFL games.

=== Footscray (VFA) ===
He later played a single game for Footscray, the 1912 VFA Grand Final, being brought in to the team in an unsuccessful attempt to counter Dave McNamara, who was an influential player in Essendon Association's victory.

== Story behind the nickname "Pompey" ==
It is possible that Fred's football nickname of "Pompey", which was applied at least as early as 1905, came from the Roman general and statesman Gnaeus Pompeius Magnus (106BC–48BC). In English, the general was called Pompey the Great, as he was a superior leader of men.

=== Harold "Pompey" Elliott ===
One of Australia's greatest military figures, Major General Harold Elliott (1878–1931), also acquired the nickname "Pompey". Besides sharing the same surname, his troops apparently included some former Carlton football players who thought that he reminded them of Fred Elliott, possibly as an inspiring leader. The name stuck.

== Military service ==
In March 1916, Elliot, at age 37, reluctantly enlisted in the army. He was a pacifist and a conscientious objector. Some other Carlton players had enlisted, and Fred had received white feathers in the mail, designating cowardice. He joined the 3rd Pioneer Battalion in Campbellfield.

By May of that year, and in the midst of pre-war training at the camp, Fred sought to end it all. Overcome by depression and, in an act of extreme anxiety, he attempted suicide, by cutting his throat. A report tabled by Sgt. Trewhella detailed "intermittent neurotic instability" in a man who was "acutely depressed, suicidal, and with delusions of persecution and hallucination of hearing, with acute melancholia". By August, Fred was discharged from the Army, having been declared permanently unfit to serve his country.

He was relocated to the Receiving House at Royal Park, during which time the football club quietly intervened to meet his family's mortgage repayments at 17 Homer Street, Moonee Ponds.

== Retirement ==
Fred was known as a gentleman by his family and had been a popular local figure in the Moonee Ponds area. His health improved with time but never fully recovered. Gardening, going to watch the football, time with his family and attending local cinemas at least three times a week were pastimes during retirement.
