= Dick L. Harris =

Australian rules footballer

Dick Harris
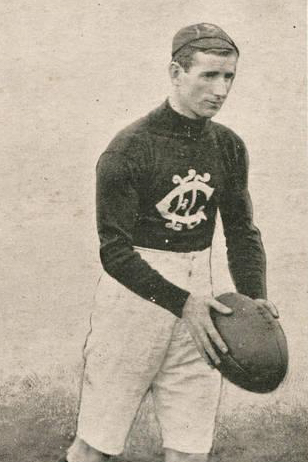
- Harris in 1910

Personal information
- Full name: Richard Leonard Harris
- Born: 14 October 1885; Carlton, Victoria
- Died: 31 October 1945 (aged 60); St Kilda, Victoria
- Original team: North Melbourne (VFA)
- Height: 173 cm (5 ft 8 in)
- Weight: 70 kg (154 lb)
- Position: Defender

Playing career^{1}
Years	Club	Games (Goals)
1905	Essendon	3 (5)
1906–07, 1909–11	Carlton	58 (14)
1912–13	St Kilda	28 (3)
Total		89 (22)
- ^{1} Playing statistics correct to the end of 1913.

Richard Leonard Harris (14 October 1885 – 31 October 1945) was an Australian rules footballer who played for Essendon, Carlton and St Kilda in the Victorian Football League (VFL).

== Career ==
Harris was a defender and played his early football with North Melbourne in the Victorian Football Association (VFA). He joined Essendon in 1905 and made three appearances before crossing to Carlton the following season.

In the 1907 semi final against St Kilda, Harris was moved to full-forward and starred with three goals. As a result, he remained near goals for the Grand Final and earned a premiership. He retired after the win but returned to action in 1909, now back in defence.

He finished his career at St Kilda where he played two seasons.
