= Bill Dolphin =

Australian rules footballer

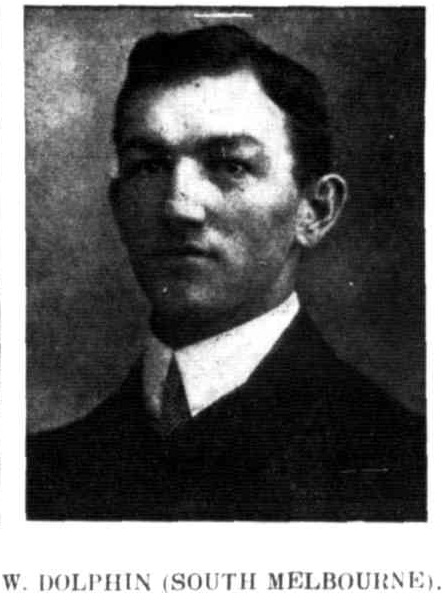
- Dolphin in 1907

Personal information
- Full name: William Harold Dolphin
- Born: 5 November 1881; Chewton, Victoria
- Died: 9 September 1969 (aged 87); Brighton, Victoria
- Original team: Yarrawonga

Playing career^{1}
Years	Club	Games (Goals)
1905–1911	South Melbourne	100 (0)
- ^{1} Playing statistics correct to the end of 1911.

William Harold Dolphin (5 November 1881 – 9 September 1969) was an Australian rules footballer who played with South Melbourne in the Victorian Football League (VFL).

Dolphin was a fullback from Yarrawonga, who captained South Melbourne in 1907 in 1908. He captained his club in the 1907 VFL Grand Final, which they lost narrowly to Carlton. An injury cost him a place in South Melbourne's 1909 premiership team, after playing in their preliminary final win the previous week. In 1911 he became just the fifth South Melbourne player to reach 100 VFL games.
