= Fred Jinks =

Australian rules footballer

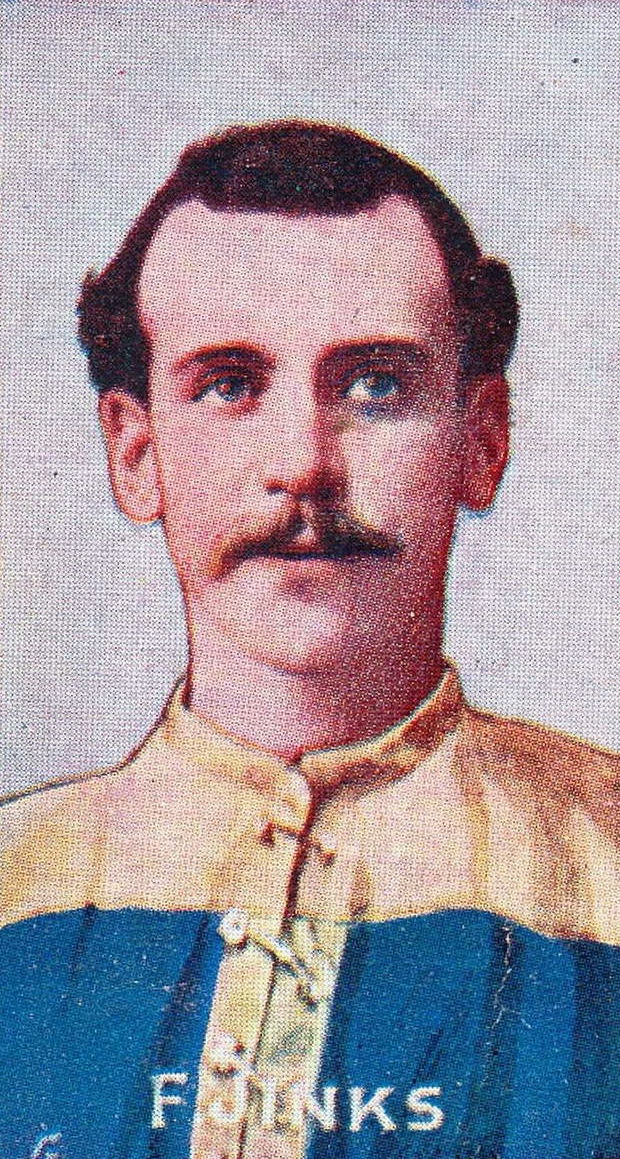
- Cigarette card of Jinks in 1908

Personal information
- Full name: Frederick Tyson Jinks
- Born: 24 November 1880; Eaglehawk, Victoria
- Died: 8 February 1940 (aged 59); Carlton North, Victoria
- Original team: Eaglehawk (Bendigo FL) / Footscray (VFA)
- Debut: Round 8, 1906, Carlton vs. Melbourne, at The MCG
- Height: 180 cm (5 ft 11 in)
- Weight: 78 kg (172 lb)

Playing career^{1}
Years	Club	Games (Goals)
1906–1909	Carlton	60 (28)
- ^{1} Playing statistics correct to the end of 1909.

Frederick Tyson Jinks (24 November 1880 – 8 February 1940) was an Australian rules footballer who played for Carlton in the Victorian Football League during the early 1900s.

Originally from VFA club Footscray, Jinks was recruited by Carlton in 1906. Although he spent only four seasons with Carlton, he played in a Grand Final each year for three premierships. He played mainly in the ruck but was also used as a half forward flanker. In 1908 he became the club's vice captain and left two years later as a response to the sacking of coach Jack Worrall. He returned to the VFA where he played with North Melbourne, winning a premiership in 1910 and acting as captain-coach in 1912.
