= Les Beck =

Australian rules footballer

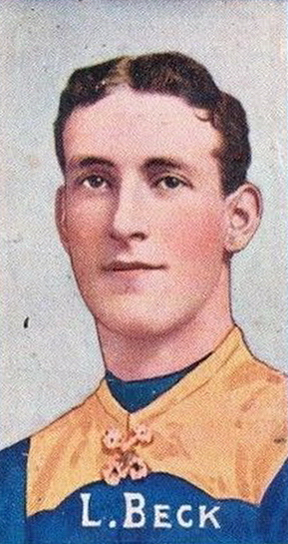
- Cigarette card of Beck in 1909

Personal information
- Full name: James Harold Leslie Beck
- Born: 5 January 1886; Maffra, Victoria
- Died: 30 September 1961 (aged 75); Heidelberg, Victoria
- Original team: Carlton Juniors
- Debut: Round 8, 1906, Carlton vs. Melbourne, at The MCG
- Height: 185 cm (6 ft 1 in)
- Weight: 76 kg (168 lb)

Playing career^{1}
Years	Club	Games (Goals)
1906–1909	Carlton	60 (3)
1910	Port Melbourne (VFA)	6 (0)
1912	Melbourne City (VFA)	5 (2)
- ^{1} Playing statistics correct to the end of 1912.

James Harold Leslie Beck (5 January 1886 – 30 September 1961) was an Australian rules footballer who played for Carlton in the VFL during the early 1900s.

As part of a strong Carlton side he has a remarkable win loss record, losing only seven of the 60 games that he played with Carlton. Born in Gippsland, Beck spent most of his time in the back pocket and was a member of three Carlton premiership teams.

In World War One Beck joined the Australian military and fought in France. He was twice shot during the conflict but survived.
