= Jack Worrall =

Australian sportsperson (1861–1937)

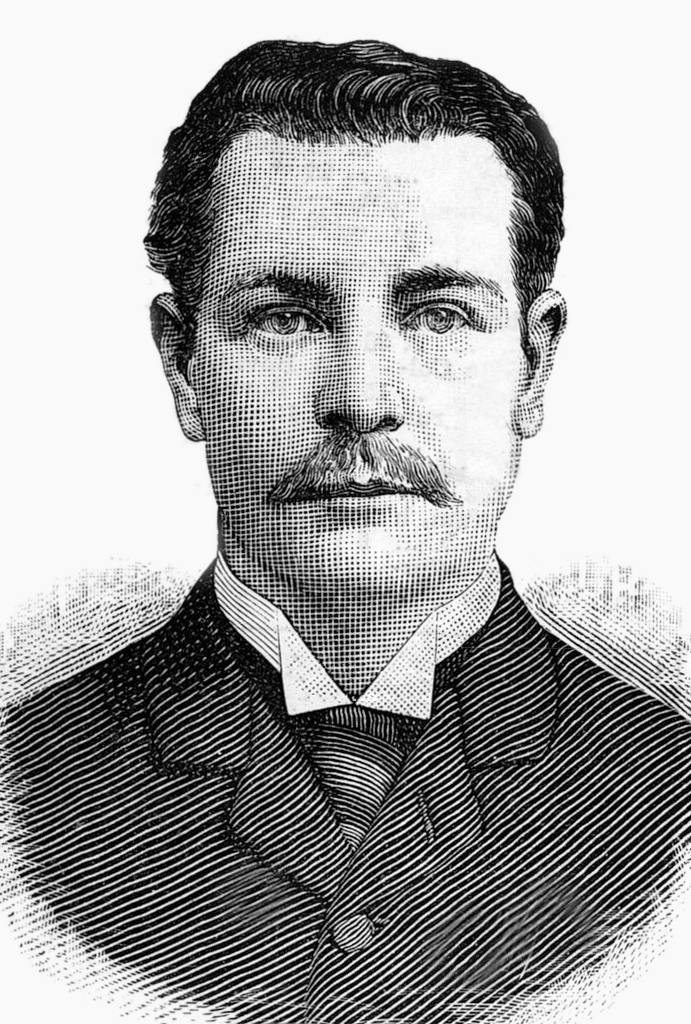

Personal information
- Full name: John Worrall
- Born: 20 June 1861; Maryborough, Victoria
- Died: 17 November 1937 (aged 76); Fairfield, Victoria
- Original team: South Ballarat

Playing career
Years	Club	Games (Goals)
1883–1884	South Ballarat	5 (2)
1884–1887; 1889–1893	Fitzroy	90 (132)
Total		95 (134)

Coaching career^{3}
Years	Club	Games (W–L–D)
1902–1909	Carlton	144 (100–43–1)
1911–1920	Essendon	135 (65–67–3)
Total		279 (165–110–4)
- ^{3} Coaching statistics correct as of 1920.

Career highlights
- VFA: Fitzroy captain 1886–1887, 1889–1892; VFL: Carlton premiership coach 1906, 1907, 1908; Essendon premiership coach 1911, 1912

John Worrall (20 June 1861 – 17 November 1937) was an Australian rules footballer who played for the Fitzroy Football Club in the VFA, and a Test cricketer. He was also a prominent coach in both sports and a journalist.

A small, nuggety man with broad shoulders, pink complexion and intense brown eyes, Worrall was one of Australia's great all-round sports people of the nineteenth century, and was involved in Australian football and cricket at the elite level for many decades. After his retirement, he coached both sports, and is considered the "father" of Australian football coaching. Worrall had an extended career as a sporting journalist, and he was a highly respected member of the press box right up until his death in 1937. He was no stranger to conflict, and his forthright manner embroiled him in a number of sporting controversies throughout his lifetime.

== Early life ==
Born on the Victorian Goldfields at Chinaman's Flat, between Timor and Maryborough, Worrall was the seventh child of Irish-born parents, Joseph and Ann. He attended state school in Maryborough, but moved to Ballarat in his early twenties. There, he came under notice playing cricket against the touring English team, which led to his selection for Victoria in 1883. Joining the South Ballarat Football Club, Worrall showed excellent potential and he was persuaded to move to Melbourne and play for the fledgling Fitzroy club in 1884. At this stage, Fitzroy had just secured admission to the game's elite competition, the Victorian Football Association (VFA). Worrall became a major factor in the emergence of Fitzroy as a powerful team. During summer, he turned out for the Fitzroy Cricket Club.

On Saturday, 27 September 1884, Worrall was playing a cricket match at Albert Park. The Fitzroy Football Club, short of a man, prevailed upon Worrall to play in their team in the match against South Melbourne in Fitzroy's last match for 1884 (Worrall's first season with that club). Worrall played the entire match for Fitzroy, in his "white flannels"!

The move to Fitzroy dramatically improved Worrall's prospects in both sports. He played his first Ashes test match in the 1884–1885 season, when he was called into the team at the last minute to replace a player who was in financial dispute over his proposed fee for the game. At this time in his career, Worrall was a middle-order bat who bowled medium pace. He failed to secure a regular place in the test team, and was not always a regular selection for the Victorian team.

== Champion footballer and Test match success ==
Jack Worrall
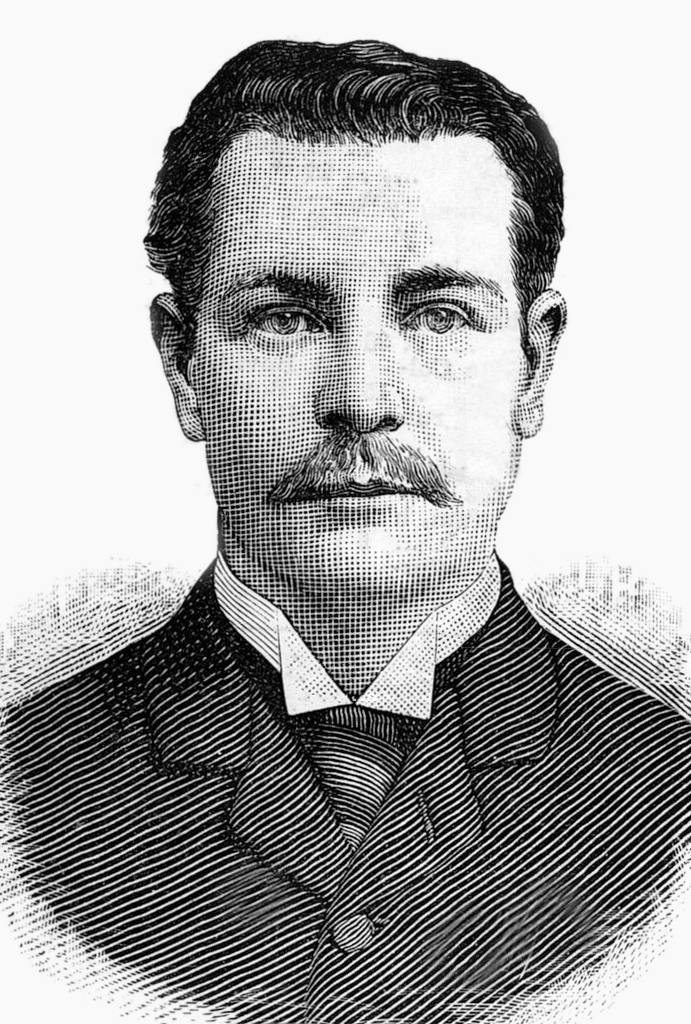

Cricket information
- Batting: Right-handed
- Bowling: Right-arm medium

International information
- National side: Australia
- Test debut (cap 40): 1 January 1885 v England
- Last Test: 14 August 1899 v England

Career statistics
Competition	Test	First-class
Matches	11	142
Runs scored	478	4,660
Batting average	25.15	20.99
100s/50s	0/5	7/16
Top score	76	128
Balls bowled	255	6,877
Wickets	1	105
Bowling average	127.00	23.10
5 wickets in innings	0	4
10 wickets in match	0	0
Best bowling	1/97	5/20
Catches/stumpings	13/–	101/–
- Source: CricInfo, 12 October 2022

Worrall's football showed more consistency than his cricket. Already captain of the team, Worrall played as a rover. He was skilled, fearless, could kick with either foot and was an excellent overhead mark for his size. Regularly selected for the Victorian team, he is one of very few men to have represented Victoria at both sports. Football was put on hold the following winter when he was chosen to tour England with the Australian cricket team.

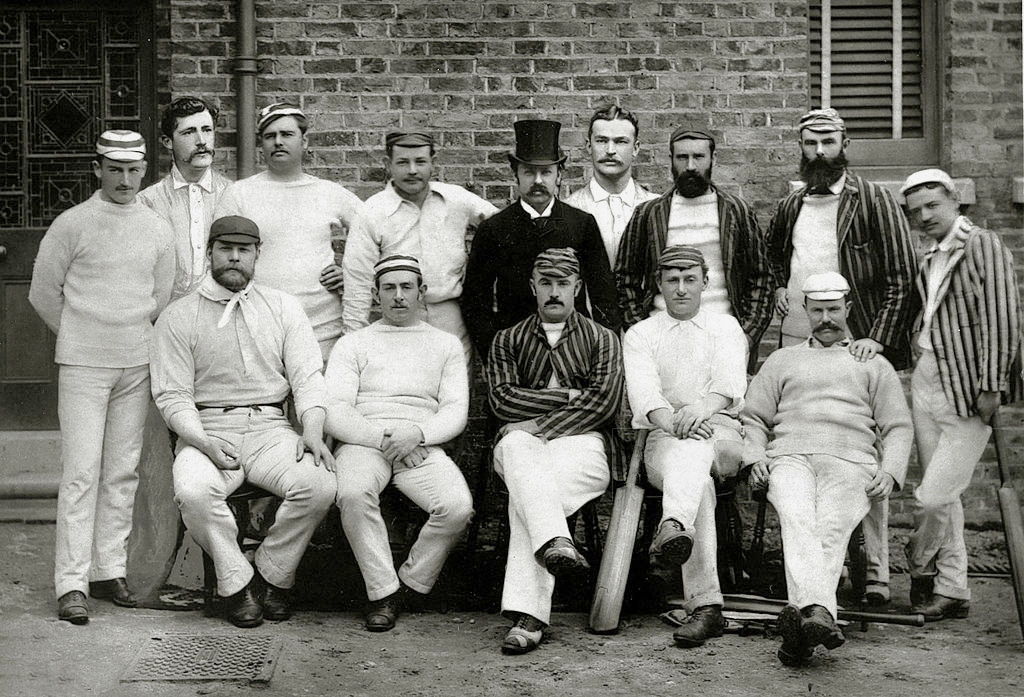
Picture of the 1888 Australian cricket team that toured England. The players are – Back row (l to r): Jack Ferris, Sammy Jones, Affie Jarvis, Jack Worrall, CW Beal (manager), Jack Lyons, Jack Blackham, Harry Boyle, John Edwards. Seated (l to r): George Bonnor, Charlie Turner, Percy McDonnell (captain), Harry Trott, Alec Bannerman.

Along with most of his teammates, Worrall struggled during the wet English summer and failed to enhance his reputation. On his return to Melbourne, he was named The Argus Player of the Year in 1890, and Fitzroy's key player during these years. Injury got the better of him in 1892, and he retired from football, which allowed him to concentrate on the summer game. The next year, he married Agnes McCullum in Fitzroy.

He switched allegiance to the Carlton Cricket Club and in 1896 scored an Australian- record 417 not out for the Blues in a match with University. He reorganised his style, becoming a more aggressive batsman who often opened but no longer bowled. In addition, he was inspirational in the field and his leadership qualities were recognised with the Victorian captaincy sixteen times. A number of big innings for the state kept him in contention for higher honours. This late blooming of his talent culminated in selection for the 1899 tour of England, during which he turned 38. Partnering the legendary Victor Trumper at the top of the order for all five tests, Worrall had his greatest day in the Headingley test match when he scored 76 on a sticky wicket to set up an Australian victory. However, his advanced age meant that this was his last test series, although he continued with Victoria until 1902, when he was 40. In 140 first class matches, he scored 4660 runs at 20.99, took 105 wickets at 23.10, held 101 catches and scored seven centuries.

== The first coach ==
Carlton, one of the power clubs of the 1870s and 1880s - the earliest years of elite Australian football - had fallen into a state of decline in 1892, with player dissatisfaction and internal dissent causing an exodus of key players, predominately to Fitzroy and Collingwood. This culminated in the wooden spoon in 1894, and the club perennially finished second last from 1895 to 1901, being a chopping block alongside St Kilda in the early years of competition in the VFL (which began in 1897).

In 1902, Worrall, secretary of the Carlton Cricket Club, was appointed to the same role with the football club. Hitherto, Australian footballers were prepared in an ad hoc way commensurate with the organisation of the game as a semi-professional sport where official payments were outlawed, but made surreptitiously.

Worrall immediately set about leading training sessions, instructing players, formulating tactics and recruiting talent in a manner that created the role of club coach that is recognised today. For a number of years, he was often referred to as the club's "manager" or "secretary", until the term "coach" passed into common usage. Carlton's improvement and subsequent rise to power in the VFL encouraged other VFL clubs to appoint a coach, and these men used Worrall as their role model.

The Blues climbed the ladder quickly, making the finals in 1903-04-05 without winning the flag. Worrall's old club Fitzroy were the benchmark of the competition at this point, and eliminated Carlton from the finals in 1905 after beating them in the 1904 Grand Final. Worrall continually turned over players in an effort to find the right combination for success. Eventually, he developed a big, strong team that favoured long kicking and liked to close up the game, forming packs and using their physical strength in the crushes. Fitness was a priority for Worrall: he ensured that his team trained harder than the opposition.

Finally, in 1906, Carlton defeated Fitzroy in the Grand Final by 49 points, a record margin at the time, with a young team that seemed to have the footballing world at its feet, winning the club's first premiership since 1887.

This success was followed up by winning the next two premierships (1907 and 1908), the first hat-trick of premierships by a club in the VFL. The 1908 performance was the highlight of Worrall's coaching career: The Blues lost only one game (by 13 points, on a very muddy ground and in driving rain against Essendon at the EMCG) for the year (a record equalled but never beaten subsequently in VFL/AFL history), while the team's 19–1 season record remained the best across a VFL/AFL season (equalled in 1929 and 1950) until 2000.

Inevitable tensions arose, however, as the players were receiving only 30 shillings ($3) per week yet were training to a professional standard. Adding to the players' dissatisfaction was the increased money coming into the game, as Carlton's revenue had doubled since the time of Worrall's appointment. Worrall's sometimes brusque approach to dealing with individuals, and his puritanical attitude to alcohol only served to exacerbate the situation.

Early in 1909, Carlton had a players revolt over money and Worrall's disciplinary demands, with seven players refusing to take the field in the opening round match against University—a team in their second VFL season whose players were all amateurs. Despite having five of their key players unavailable, university beat Carlton by 15 points in a stunning upset, keeping Carlton goalless in the first half of the match.

The matter continued on for a number of weeks, with a small group of players holding out and threatening to leave unless Worrall gave his resignation, which he did on 29 July. He continued on as secretary, but he resigned that position at the end of the season when the disharmony was still not repaired. A number of players who supported the ex-coach left Princes Park in sympathy.

After a season as the VFL umpires' coach, Worrall was recruited by Essendon in 1911. Here, he took a talented but previously under-performing team to a premiership in his first season; and, in 1912, he led an injury-ravaged Essendon team to upset hot favourites South Melbourne in the 1912 Grand Final. Over five completed seasons, Worrall coached five premiership teams.

But Essendon declined rapidly thereafter and went into recess in 1916–1917 due to World War I. Performances failed to improve when the Same Old returned to competition, winning only fifteen out of 46 games between 1918 and 1920, prompting Worrall's retirement. As the team finished last in 1918, Worrall became the first man to coach both a premiership and a wooden spooner.

In 1922, he reappeared briefly as an assistant to Vic Belcher at his old team, Fitzroy, which went on to win the premiership from Collingwood.

== Journalism and other achievements ==
Worrall was a driving force behind the creation of the Australian Football Council (AFC) in 1905. Formed as the peak body of Australian football, the organisation initially took control of the rules of the game and organised the first interstate carnival between the Australian states and New Zealand in 1908. Worrall was elected as one of the Victorian delegates. In 1909, the Victorian Cricket Association (VCA) made Worrall coach of the state's colts team, which played at district level and was designed to develop young talent.

Beginning his journalism career with the Sydney Referee after his retirement from playing cricket, Worrall expanded his involvement in the press during Essendon's hiatus from the VFL in 1916. He joined The Australasian, and wrote on both sports. John Ritchie, in the Australian Dictionary of Biography, described his writing thus:

For over twenty years his columns were characterized by poised sentences and rich vocabulary; for all its partisanship, his direct prose was spiced with comparison, reminiscence and prediction, and conveyed a sense of drama.

In the 1930s, he was the senior man in the press box, and many attribute the coining of the phrase "Bodyline" (describing the English bowling tactics on their 1932–1933 Australian tour) to Worrall. He died in the Melbourne suburb of Fairfield, early in the 1937–1938 cricket season, survived by his wife. In honour of Worrall, the flags at the MCG, the scene of so many of his sporting triumphs, flew at half mast during a Sheffield Shield match. His funeral at Heidelberg attracted a massive crowd of former footballers, cricketers, journalists and administrators.

In 1996 Worrall's outstanding contributions to Australian rules football were recognised when he was inducted into the Australian Football Hall of Fame as a player.

== Controversies ==
- In 1892, after he was caught up in a dispute with the Fitzroy Cricket Club, he left to play with Carlton.
- In 1902, he wrote an article about the questionable bowling actions of two Australian players on tour in England; in response to this, the VCA banned Worrall from playing for Victoria for the rest of the season.
- During the 1904 pre-season, Worrall was sacked as Carlton coach after irregularities in the funds of the Carlton Football Club came to light. After an investigation, Worrall was exonerated of any wrongdoing and reinstated.
- In 1909, a Carlton player revolt over training conditions and wages led to his resignation as Carlton's coach.

== See also ==
- List of Australian rules football and cricket players
