= 1906 VFL grand final =

Grand final of the 1906 Victorian Football League season

Carlton	Fitzroy
15.4 (94)	6.9 (45)
	1	2	3	4
CAR	3.2 (20)	7.4 (46)	9.4 (58)	15.4 (94)
FIT	1.6 (12)	1.7 (13)	6.8 (44)	6.9 (45)
- Date: 22 September 1906
- Stadium: Melbourne Cricket Ground
- Attendance: 44,437
- Umpires: Bert Wregg

The 1906 VFL Grand Final was an Australian rules football game contested between the Carlton Football Club and Fitzroy Football Club, held at the Melbourne Cricket Ground in Melbourne on 22 September 1906. It was the 9th annual Grand Final of the Victorian Football League, staged to determine the premiers for the 1906 VFL season. The match, attended by 44,437 spectators, was won by Carlton by a margin of 49 points, marking that club's first VFL premiership victory.

== Lead-up ==
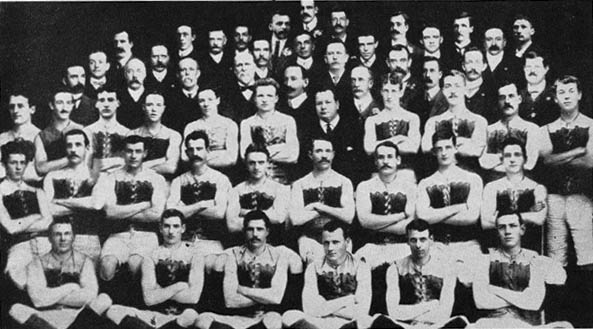
Carlton FC team, premiers

After the home-and-away season (which lasted for seventeen matches, including the "first round" of fourteen matches and a "second round" of three matches), Carlton was top of the ladder with a record of 14–3 and a percentage of 153.5; Fitzroy finished second with a record of 13–4 and a percentage of 153.3.

The finals were contested using the variation of the amended Argus system seen between 1902 and 1906. Fitzroy faced fourth-placed Essendon in the First Semi-Final, and won by 36 points, and Carlton faced third-placed Collingwood in the Second Semi-Final and won by ten points.

Carlton (now 15–3) and Fitzroy (now 14–4) then faced off in the final. By virtue of their records, neither club could lose the match and still finish with a better win–loss record than the other; and therefore under the first amended Argus system, there was no chance for a challenge grand final and it was known from the opening bounce that this match would be decisive for the premiership.

== Teams ==
Carlton	Fitzroy

Carlton
B:	Norm Clark	Doug Gillespie	Les Beck
HB:	Billy Payne	George Johnson	Charlie Hammond
C:	George Bruce	Rod McGregor	Ted Kennedy
HF:	Frank Caine	Jim Marchbank	Mick Grace
F:	Alex Lang	George Topping	Ike Little
Foll:	Jim Flynn (c)	Fred Jinks	Fred Elliott
Coach:	Jack Worrall		

Fitzroy
B:	Stewart 'Frank' Abbott	Geoff Moriarty	Joe Johnson
HB:	Gilbert Barker	Jim Sharp	Percy Sheehan
C:	Barclay Bailes	Tammy Beauchamp	Edgar Kneen
HF:	Fred Fontaine	Gerald Brosnan	Bob Smith
F:	Les Millis	Charlie Naismith	Ern Jenkins (c)
Foll:	Bill Walker	Herbert Milne	Percy Trotter

- Umpire – Bert Wregg

== Statistics ==
=== Goalkickers ===
Carlton:

- F Caine 3
- M Grace 3
- G Topping 3
- L Beck 1
- F Elliott 1
- C Hammond 1
- F Jinks 1
- I Little 1
- J Marchbank 1

Fitzroy:

- G Brosnan 1
- F Fontaine 1
- L Millis 1
- C Naismith 1
- P Trotter 1
- B Walker 1

== See also ==
- 1906 VFL season
