= 1904 VFL grand final =

Grand final of the 1904 Victorian Football League season

Fitzroy	Carlton
9.7 (61)	5.7 (37)
	1	2	3	4
FIT	3.1 (19)	3.2 (20)	5.2 (32)	9.7 (61)
CAR	1.1 (7)	3.3 (21)	3.7 (25)	5.7 (37)
- Date: 17 September 1904
- Stadium: Melbourne Cricket Ground
- Attendance: 32,688
- Umpires: Henry "Ivo" Crapp (field); Bert Wregg (boundary)

The 1904 VFL Grand Final was an Australian rules football game contested between the Fitzroy Football Club and Carlton Football Club, held at the Melbourne Cricket Ground in Melbourne on 17 September 1904. It was the seventh annual Grand Final of the Victorian Football League, staged to determine the premiers for the 1904 VFL season. The match, attended by 32,688 spectators, was won by Fitzroy by a margin of 24 points, marking that club's third premiership victory.

== Right to challenge ==
This season was played under the amended Argus system. Fitzroy was the minor premier, and Carlton had finished second. The teams both qualified for this match by winning their semi-finals matches.

If Carlton had won this match, Fitzroy would have had the right to challenge Carlton to a rematch for the premiership on the following weekend, because Fitzroy had the best record in the league. The winner of that match would then have won the premiership.

== Teams ==
Fitzroy	Carlton

Fitzroy
B:	Alf Sharp	Fred Fontaine	Wally Naismith
HB:	Ern Jenkins	Jim Sharp	Joe Johnson
C:	Alf Bartlett	Harry Clarke	Les Millis
HF:	Edgar Kneen	Gerald Brosnan (c)	Gilbert Barker
F:	Jack McDonough	Percy Sheehan	Percy Trotter
Foll:	Herbert Milne	Bill Walker	Bill McSpeerin

Carlton
B:	Billy Payne	Frank Hince	Ernie Walton
HB:	Billy Leeds	Albert Trim	Charlie Roland
C:	George Bruce	Bob Boyle	Ted Kennedy
HF:	Henry McShane	Mick Grace	Joe McShane (c)
F:	Jim Marchbank	George Topping	Eddie Prescott
Foll:	Jim Flynn	Fred Elliott	Archie Snell
Coach:	Jack Worrall		

- Field umpire – Henry "Ivo" Crapp
- Boundary umpire – Bert Wregg

== Statistics ==
=== Goalkickers ===
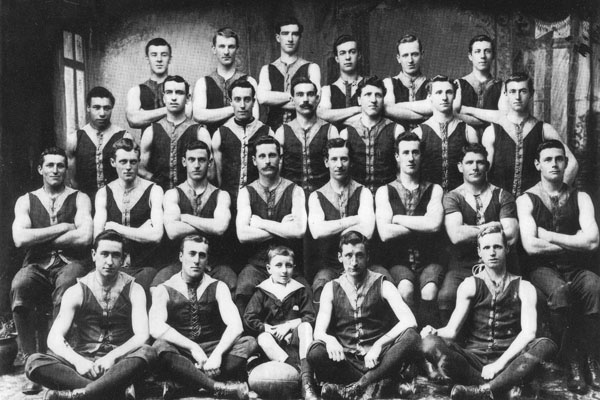
Fitzroy FC, Premiers

Fitzroy

- G Brosnan 2
- E Kneen 2
- J McDonough 1
- L Millis 1
- P Sheehan 1
- P Trotter 1
- B Walker 1

Carlton

- G Bruce 1
- M Grace 1
- E Prescott 1
- A Snell 1

== See also ==
- 1904 VFL season
