= 1905 VFL grand final =

Grand final of the 1905 Victorian Football League season

Fitzroy	Collingwood
4.6 (30)	2.5 (17)
	1	2	3	4
FIT	0.3 (3)	1.3 (9)	4.6 (30)	4.6 (30)
COL	0.1 (1)	1.3 (9)	2.4 (16)	2.5 (17)
- Date: 30 September 1905
- Stadium: Melbourne Cricket Ground
- Attendance: 28,000
- Umpires: Henry "Ivo" Crapp

The 1905 VFL Grand Final was an Australian rules football game contested between the Fitzroy Football Club and Collingwood Football Club, held at the Melbourne Cricket Ground in Melbourne on 30 September 1905. It was the 8th annual Grand Final of the Victorian Football League, staged to determine the premiers for the 1905 VFL season. The match, attended by 28,000 spectators, was won by Fitzroy by a margin of 13 points, marking that club's fourth premiership victory and second in succession.

== Background ==
the home-and-away season of 1905, Collingwood had dominated, losing only two games, one of them in the opening round to Fitzroy and the other to Essendon in the fourteenth round. Fitzroy had been on top until the return match between the two sides in the eighth round, but slumped a little during the latter half of the season with losses to Geelong and Carlton, plus a draw with South Melbourne. In the finals, however, Fitzroy had bounced back against Essendon, whilst Collingwood had failed badly against the Blues – losing by 46 points, which was a big margin at the time.

September 1905 was by far the coldest September ever known in Melbourne since records began in 1855. The average maximum temperature was 13.53 °C (56.35 °F) and the average minimum 5.6 °C (42.1 °F) as against averages up to 1996 of 17.08 °C (62.74 °F) and 7.7 °C (45.9 °F). The result was that, although no rain actually fell during the game, the frequent showers earlier in the month were never able to evaporate before the match was played, leaving the MCG very heavy and soft all through. Combined with a biting cold wind and temperatures of around 11 °C (52 °F), this made conditions very difficult.

No goals were scored in the first quarter, and only one behind in the last. In the third quarter, however, Fitzroy's superior pace and power allowed it to kick three goals with the wind, which gave it a comfortable winning margin.

As in 1927 and 1960, the 1905 Grand Final saw the losing team kick the lowest score for the entire season. In fact, with the exception of the 1927 Grand Final and two games in 1906 and 1908, no V/AFL match has had a lower aggregate score than the 1905 Grand Final's 6.11 (47). Only one match since (Footscray versus Fitzroy in 1953) has had as few as seventeen aggregate scoring shots. Apart from the 1960 Grand Final, Collingwood has not kicked a lower score since 1901.

== Result ==
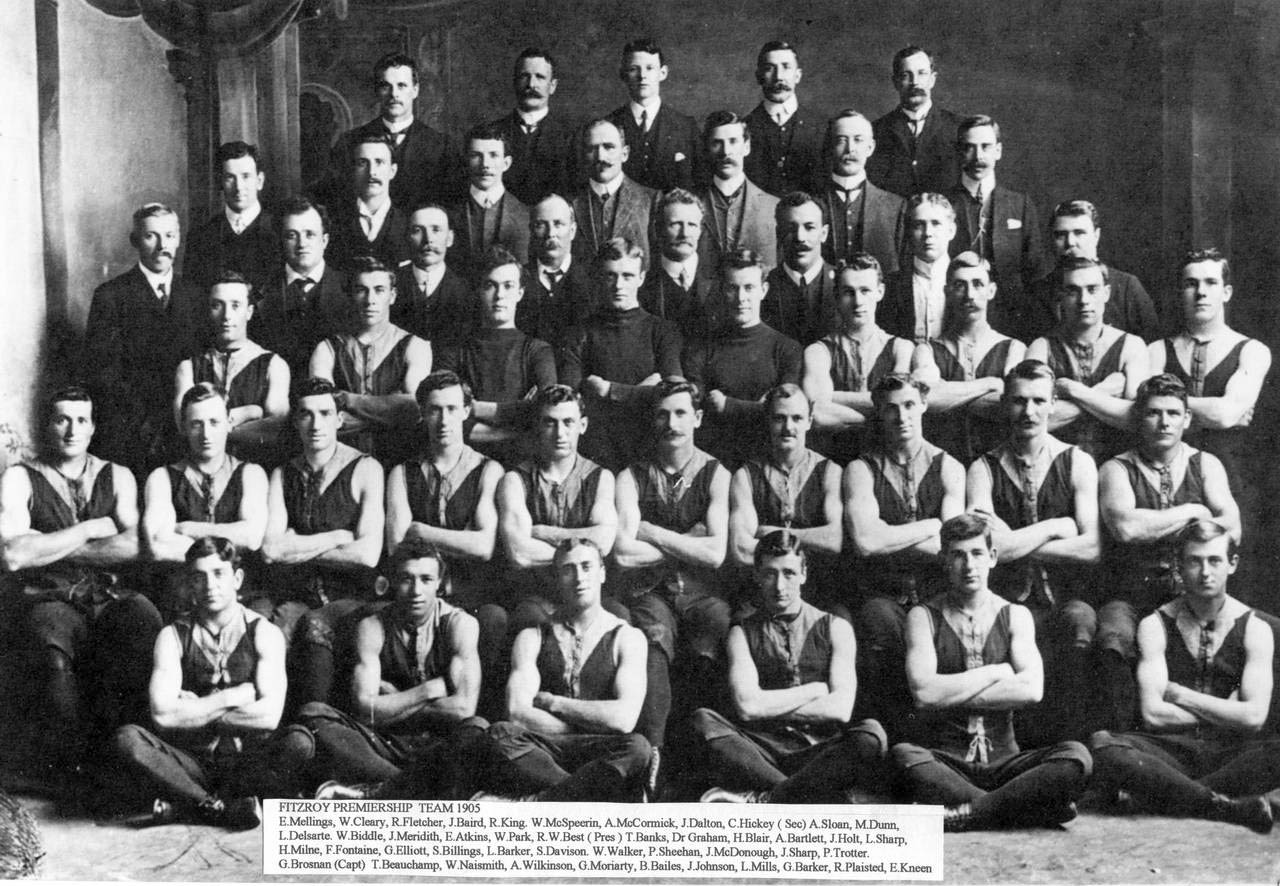
Fitzroy, Premier team

	1st	2nd	3rd	Final
Collingwood	0.1	1.3	2.4	2.5 (17)
Fitzroy	0.3	1.3	4.6	4.6 (30)

Best	Fitzroy	Bailes (best on ground), Jenkins, Beauchamp, Millis, Fontaine, Johnson, L. Barker, Walker
	Collingwood	Drohan, Pears, Dummett, Rush, Green, Strachan
Goals	Fitzroy	Millis, Trotter, Brosnan, L. Barker
	Collingwood	Nash, Pears

== Teams ==
Fitzroy	Collingwood

Fitzroy
B:	Wally Naismith	Geoff Moriarty	Lou Barker
HB:	Ern Jenkins	Jim Sharp	Percy Sheehan
C:	Gilbert Barker	Tammy Beauchamp	Barclay Bailes
HF:	Gerald Brosnan (c)	Fred Fontaine	Joe Johnson
F:	Alf Wilkinson	Jack McDonough	Percy Trotter
Foll:	Herbert Milne	Bill Walker	Les Millis

Collingwood
B:	Matthew Fell	Bill Proudfoot	Alf Dummett
HB:	Bob Rush	Jack Monohan	Don Fraser
C:	George Green	Jock McHale	Percy Gibb
HF:	Charlie Pannam (c)	Robert Nash	Harry Pears
F:	George Angus	Eddie Drohan	Jack Incoll
Foll:	Arthur Leach	Bob Strachan	Dick Condon
Coach:	Dick Condon		

- Field umpire – Henry "Ivo" Crapp
- Boundary umpire – Jack Davidson

== See also ==
- 1905 VFL season
