= List of Collingwood Football Club presidents =

The president of the Collingwood Football Club is the highest role at the "company". (Note: "Company" refers to Collingwood Football Club Limited: financial/business side of the sporting team.) The president has the ultimate responsibility for financial and business management.

A total of 15 people have served as presidents of the Collingwood Football Club. The first and founding president of Collingwood was former Collingwood mayor, Victorian MLA and Speaker, William Beazley. Beazley was president of Collingwood from the founding of the club in 1892 until 1912. The second, Alfred Cross, was briefly president, but held the position of vice-president since the foundation of the club in 1892 (21 years). Cross was the first individual to be awarded a life membership honour. Former Collingwood player Jim Sharp became the third president for Collingwood. His reign lasted ten years (1914–1924), winning two premierships in the process. The fourth president of Collingwood was another former player, Harry Curtis. Curtis currently is the longest-serving president of Collingwood, having served as president for twenty-five years. Along with being the longest-serving president, Curtis is also the most successful, winning six premierships in a nine-year span, including Collingwood's four-time back-to-back premierships from 1927 to 1930. Two-time premierships winning president Sydney Coventry Sr. served as fifth president for Collingwood, from 1950 to 1963. Coventry was Collingwood's last president to win a premiership for thirty-two years. For eleven years, Tom Sherrin served as sixth president. Ern Clarke and John Hickey served as seventh and eight president, respectively. Between 1982 and 1986, Journalist Ranald Macdonald was Collingwood's ninth president. For the first time since Sydney Coventry Sr., Allan MacAlister, tenth president, won the VFL premiership in 1990. Eleventh president and former player, Kevin Rose, was only in the position for just under three years but remained a Collingwood board member until 2007. The twelfth and second-longest serving president of Collingwood was radio broadcaster commentator and journalist Eddie McGuire. McGuire was president of Collingwood between 1998 and 2021, winning one premiership. During McGuire's tenure Collingwood were grand finalists five times, the most of any president since Sydney Coventry Sr. In April 2021, Mark Korda was appointed the 13th president of Collingwood. He was a vice-president before becoming president.

List of Collingwood presidents (Note: Unless displayed, the list does not include possible period(s) of time in which the role of president was vacant, administered by a committee or had a de facto acting President.)
No.	Name	Took office	Left office	Time in office	Occupation / Notes	Premierships	Ref(s).
1	William Beazley	1892	1912	20 years, 123 days	Politician; involved with precursor club, Britannia Football Club.	3 (1902, 1903, 1910)	
2	Alfred Cross	1913		1 year (Note: Specific dates are unknown, however, Cross is alleged to have resigned during the 1913 season.)	Tailor; former Collingwood vice-president.	—	
3	Jim Sharp	1914	1924	10 years, 209 days	Former VFL player; former Collingwood vice-president.	2 (1917, 1919)	
4	Harry Curtis	1925	1950	25 years, 112 days	Accountant; former VFL player.	6 (1927, 1928, 1929, 1930, 1935, 1936)	
—	Gordon Carlyon	24 May – 28 June 1950 (Note: Following the resignation of the Collingwood Football Social Club Committee, Mr. Carlyon, as secretary, was acting secretary-manager until the conclusion of the elections of the president, vice-president, treasurer, and committee members.)		35 days		—	
5	Sydney Coventry Sr.	1950	1963	12 years, 246 days	Former VFL player; former Collingwood vice-president.	2 (1953, 1958)	
6	Tom Sherrin	1963	1974	11 years, 214 days	Manufacturer; former Collingwood vice-president.	—	
7	Ern Clarke	1974	1976	1 year, 213 days	Businessman	—	
8	John Hickey	1976	1982	6 years, 153 days	RAAF pilot; former Collingwood vice-president.	—	
9	Ranald Macdonald	1982	1986	3 years, 208 days	Journalist; lecturer	—	
10	Allan McAlister	1986	1995	9 years, 157 days	Businessman; former Collingwood treasurer	1 (1990)	
11	Kevin Rose	1995	1998	2 years, 253 days	Businessman; former VFL player, coach	—	
12	Eddie McGuire	1998	2021	22 years, 103 days	Commentator; journalist; businessman.	1 (2010)	
—	Peter Murphy; Mark Korda	10 February – 21 April 2021 (Note: Following McGuire's decision to stand down, Peter Murphy and Mark Korda, co-vice presidents, were appointed co-presidents until a successor could be decided.)		70 days	Collingwood vice-president(s).	—	
13	Mark Korda	21 April – 16 December 2021		239 days	Businessman; former Collingwood vice-president. (Note: Mark Korda also holds the role of director.)	—	
14	Jeff Browne	2021	2024	3 years, 0 days	Lawyer	1 (2023)	
15	Barry Carp	2024	Incumbent	98 days	Investor and fund manager; founder of River Capital		

== See also ==
- List of VFL/AFL commissioners and club presidents
