= 1903 VFL grand final =

Grand final of the 1903 Victorian Football League season

Collingwood	Fitzroy
4.7 (31)	3.11 (29)
	1	2	3	4
COL	2.3 (15)	3.4 (22)	3.6 (24)	4.7 (31)
FIT	2.2 (14)	2.5 (17)	2.8 (20)	3.11 (29)
- Date: 12 September 1903
- Stadium: Melbourne Cricket Ground
- Attendance: 32,263
- Umpires: Dick Gibson

The 1903 VFL grand final was an Australian rules football game contested between the Collingwood Football Club and Fitzroy Football Club, held at the Melbourne Cricket Ground in Melbourne on 12 September 1903. It was the 6th annual grand final of the Victorian Football League, staged to determine the premiers for the 1903 VFL season. The match, attended by 32,263 spectators, was won by Collingwood by a margin of two points, marking that club's second successive premiership victory.

Gerald Brosnan had a chance to win Fitzroy the premiership with a set shot for goal off the last kick of the game but missed narrowly to give Collingwood back-to-back flags.

Collingwood's Jim Addison, playing in just his third game, was the only multiple goalkicker. Both Ern Jenkins and Bert Sharpe of Fitzroy were celebrating their 100th VFL games.

== Lead-up ==
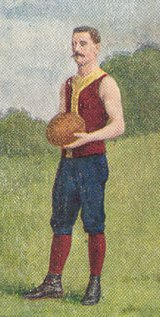
Gerald Brosnan, player of Fitz Roy

After the home-and-away season (which lasted for seventeen matches, including the "first round" of fourteen matches and a "second round" of three matches), Collingwood was top of the ladder with a record of 15–2 and a percentage of 159.4; Fitzroy finished second with a record of 14–3 and a percentage of 171.6.

The finals were contested using the variation of the first amended Argus system, seen between 1902 and 1906. Fitzroy faced fourth-placed Geelong in the first semi-final, and won by 52 points, and Collingwood faced third-placed Carlton in the second semi-final and won by four points.

Collingwood (now 16–2) and Fitzroy (now 15–3) then faced off in the final. By virtue of their records, neither club could lose the match and still finish with a better win–loss record than the other; and therefore under the first amended Argus system, there was no chance for a challenge grand final and it was known from the opening bounce that this match would be decisive for the premiership.

== Teams ==
Collingwood	Fitzroy

Collingwood
B:	George Lockwood	Bill Proudfoot	Alf Dummett
HB:	Matthew Fell	Jack Monohan	Bob Rush
C:	Charlie Pannam	Con McCormack	Eddie Drohan
HF:	Teddy Lockwood	Ted Rowell	Lardie Tulloch (c)
F:	Arthur Leach	Jim Addison	Harry Pears
Foll:	Jack Incoll	George Angus	Dick Condon

Fitzroy
B:	Alf Sharp	Ern Jenkins	Lou Barker
HB:	Wally Naismith	Jim Sharp	Fred Fontaine
C:	Tammy Beauchamp	Harry Clarke	Frank Brophy
HF:	Alf Wilkinson	Gerald Brosnan (c)	Chris Kiernan
F:	Percy Trotter	Les Millis	Bert Sharpe
Foll:	Bill Walker	Herbert Milne	Bill McSpeerin

- Umpire – Dick Gibson

== Statistics ==
=== Goalkickers ===
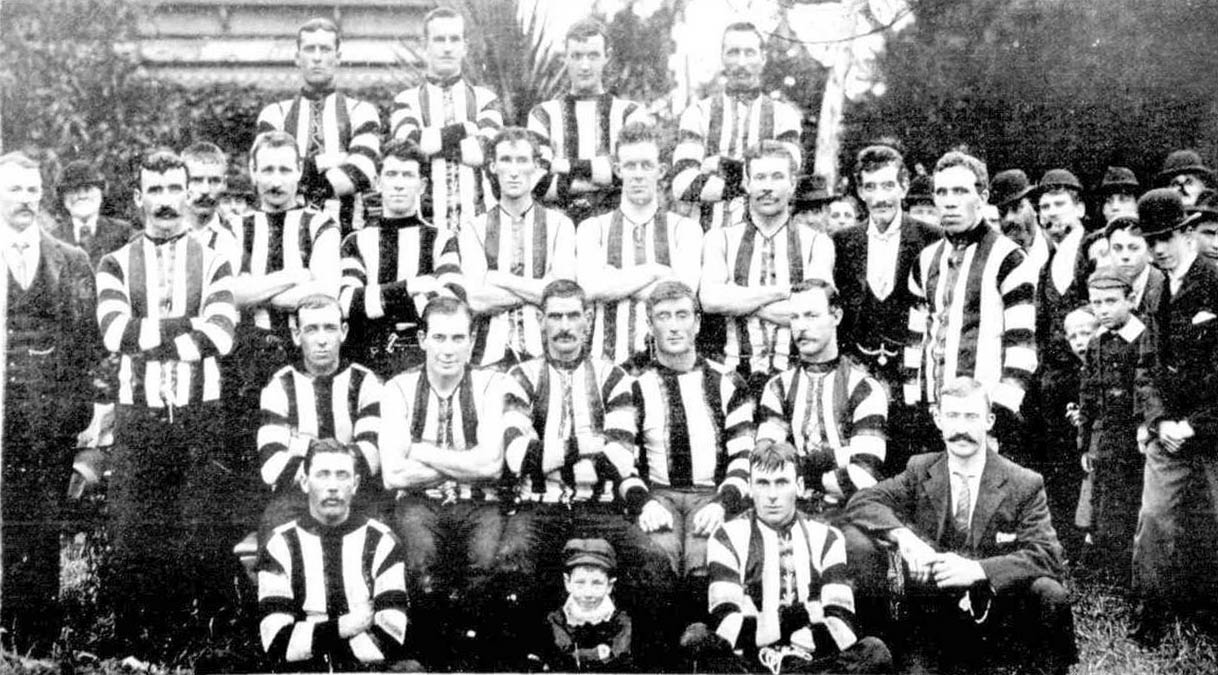
Collingwood, Premier team

Collingwood:

- Addison 2
- Condon 1
- T.Lockwood 1

Fitzroy:

- McSpeerin 1
- Millis 1
- Milne 1

=== Attendance ===
- MCG crowd – 32,263

== See also ==
- 1903 VFL season
