= Jeff Browne =

Former AFL lawyer and current chairman of Collingwood Football Club

Personal information
- Full name: Jeffrey Browne
- Date of birth: 1955 (age 70–71)

Youth career
- Years: Team
- 1972: Collingwood (U19s)

Managerial career
- 1985–2005: AFL (external lawyer)
- 2022–2024: Collingwood (president)

Jeffrey Browne (born 1955) is a lawyer and football administrator, who served as the 14th president of the Collingwood Football Club from 2021 to 2024. Browne previously worked as an external lawyer for the Australian Football League (AFL) for 22 years. He played for the Collingwood U19s in 1972.

As well as being Collingwood president, Browne has served as chairman of MA Financial Group, Walkinshaw Automotive and the Juvenile Diabetes Research Foundation. He was the managing director of Channel Nine from 2010 until 2013.

== Collingwood Football Club president ==
Browne was the fourteenth president of Collingwood. He took over the role from Eddie McGuire after the former AFL president stood down over backlash following comments he made about the "Do Better" report. Browne was appointed to the role in a unanimous vote, replacing Mark Korda.

Browne announced his resignation from the board and as president in October 2024, citing a desire to focus on his personal health and wellbeing. He was succeeded as president by Barry Carp.

== See also ==
- History of the Collingwood Football Club
