= Jack Incoll =

Australian rules footballer

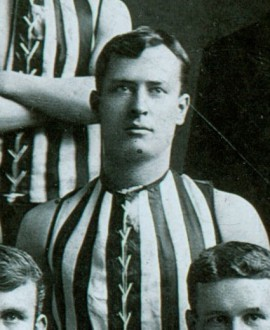
- Incoll in 1906

Personal information
- Full name: John Valentine Incoll
- Born: 14 February 1879; Ballarat East, Victoria
- Died: 22 May 1961 (aged 82); Adelaide, South Australia
- Original team: Rose of Northcote
- Debut: Round 3, 1899, South Melbourne vs. Essendon, at East Melbourne

Playing career^{1}
Years	Club	Games (Goals)
1899	South Melbourne	4 (3)
1902–1906	Collingwood	68 (44)
Total		72 (47)
- ^{1} Playing statistics correct to the end of 1906.

Career highlights
- 2× VFL premiership player: 1902, 1903

John Valentine Incoll (14 February 1879 – 22 May 1961) was an Australian rules footballer who played for the South Melbourne Football Club and Collingwood Football Club in the Victorian Football League (VFL).

== Family ==
The son of Frank Tychicus Incoll (1840–1905), and his second wife, Margaret Incoll (1840–1929), née Nicholas, John Valentine Incoll was born at Ballarat East, Victoria on 14 February 1879.

He married Florence Laura Mills (1881–1939) in 1901. They had two sons, and three daughters — one of whom died aged 20 months, as the result of burns she received when her dress caught fire.

== Football ==
Incoll started his career at South Melbourne but it was not until he went to Collingwood in 1902 that he established himself as a VFL footballer. He played in Collingwood's 1902 and 1903 premiership sides and at one stage the club strung together 16 consecutive wins with him in the team. Incoll was also a member of the side which lost the 1905 Grand Final.

Used in a variety of positions, he spent a lot of his time in the forward line and was also pushed back in defence on occasions. Incoll was a fill in ruckman when Collingwood won the 1903 premiership. In a game against St Kilda in the 1905 VFL season he kicked a career best six goals, his next best from his 72 games was two goals which he achieved numerous times. He finished his career in New South Wales and represented the state at the 1911 Adelaide Carnival.

== Military service ==
He enlisted in the First AIF on 6 September 1915, served overseas, was wounded in action in France, and returned to Australia on 12 May 1918, and was discharged on medical grounds.
