= Norm Clark =

Australian rules footballer and coach (1878–1943)

Norman Clark
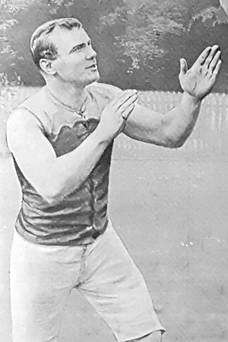
- Clark in 1907

Personal information
- Full name: Norman Childers Clark
- Nickname: Hackenschmidt
- Born: 12 November 1878; North Adelaide, South Australia
- Died: 26 December 1943 (aged 65); Fitzroy, Victoria
- Original team: Stawell
- Height: 170 cm (5 ft 7 in)
- Weight: 86 kg (190 lb)
- Position: Half back flank

Playing career^{1}
Years	Club	Games (Goals)
1897–1903	North Adelaide	82 (5)
1905–1912	Carlton	126 (3)

Coaching career^{3}
Years	Club	Games (W–L–D)
1912	Carlton	20 (15–5–0)
1913	Brighton	18 (5–13–0)
1914–1918	Carlton	86 (59–23–4)
1919	Richmond	19 (12–7–0)
1920–1922	Carlton	44 (28–14–2)
1924	North Melbourne	18 (10–8–0)
1925–1926	St Kilda	35 (14–21–0)
1929	Prahran	22 (5–16–1)
1931	North Melbourne	10 (0–10–0)
- ^{1} Playing statistics correct to the end of 1912.^{3} Coaching statistics correct as of 1931.

Career highlights
- Player: 2× North Adelaide premiership player (1900, 1902); 3× Carlton premiership player (1906, 1907, 1908); Coach: Carlton premiership coach 1914, 1915

Norman Childers "Hackenschmidt" Clark (12 November 1878 – 26 December 1943) was an Australian rules footballer who played for the Carlton Football Club in the Victorian Football League (VFL) between 1905 and 1912.

== Family ==
The son of Edward John Clark, and Margaret Clark, née Cooper, Norman Childers Clark was born on 12 November 1878. He married Eileen Florence Fleming (1888–1983) on 11 June 1918. They had two children: Norman Adrian Clark (1919–1998), and Bryan Childers Clark (1923–2003).

== Early career ==
Prior to joining Carlton, he had played in two premiership teams at North Adelaide.

A talented sprinter, in 1899 he won the 130-yard (120 m) Stawell Gift in 11^{4}/_{5} seconds off a handicap of 14 and a half yards. His prize of 50 gold sovereigns was used to buy a handmade gold pocket watch, in which he had his initials 'N.C.C.' inscribed. He moved to Stawell, hoping to win another Gift, and he played two seasons with Stawell Football Club.

== VFL career ==
Upon his arrival at Carlton in 1905, his teammates noticed his exceptional physique and nicknamed him "Hackenschmidt" after the famous strongman and professional wrestler Georg Hackenschmidt.

He played in three consecutive premiership sides for Carlton (1906, 1907, and 1908) and continued until 1912. He then captain-coached Brighton in the VFA in 1913 before retiring.

== Coaching ==
He was playing coach of Carlton in 1912 before moving to Brighton in 1913. In 1914 he was back at Carlton and coaching Carlton to back-to-back premierships in 1914–15; he was with Charlie Hammond, the only two people involved in Carlton's first five VFL flags.

After leaving Carlton at the end of the 1918 season, he took up the head coaching role at Richmond. In his only season, he took the Tigers to the Grand Final. He attained the rare feat of coaching two separate clubs in VFL Grand Finals.

Clark returned to Carlton in 1920 and coached for two and a half years before resigning in mid-1922.

Clark was also the coach of VFL sides St Kilda in 1925–26.

He was captain-coach of Victorian Football Association (VFA) side Brighton in 1913. He coached junior and senior football for seventeen seasons in the VFA, the VFL and for Blackburn in the Ringwood Districts Football Association, with four more premierships to his credit by the time he retired after the 1931 season.

In 1931 he was appointed coach of North Melbourne; after ten winless games, he resigned.

== Death ==
Clark died on Boxing Day in 1943.
