= Matthew Fell =

Australian rules footballer

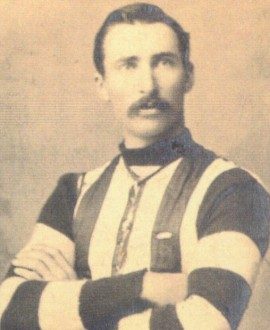
- Fell during his Collingwood career

Personal information
- Full name: Matthew Foster Fell
- Born: 23 August 1875; Gisborne, Victoria
- Died: 17 March 1957 (aged 81); Fremantle, Western Australia
- Original team: Tungamah
- Debut: Round 1, 1898, Collingwood vs. Geelong, at Victoria Park

Playing career^{1}
Years	Club	Games (Goals)
1898–1905	Collingwood	116 (21)
- ^{1} Playing statistics correct to the end of 1905.

Career highlights
- 2× VFL premiership player: 1902, 1903

Matthew Foster Fell (23 August 1875 – 17 March 1957) was an Australian rules footballer who played for the Collingwood Football Club during the early years of the Victorian Football League (VFL).

Fell came to Collingwood from the town of Tungamah and made his senior debut in Round One 1898, soon establishing himself in the side as a utility player. He was a ruckman in the 1901 VFL Grand Final loss to Essendon Football Club and a defender in the 1902 and 1903 premierships. From 1903 until the third round of the 1904 VFL season he played in 17 successive wins. Fell's last game of VFL football was the 1905 VFL Grand Final, which Collingwood lost.
