= Thomas Beacham =

Thomas Beacham may refer to:

- Thomas Beecham (1879–1961), English conductor and impresario
- Thomas Beacham (footballer) (1878–1947), Australian rules footballer
