= Mark Korda =

Australian businessman

13th President of the Collingwood Football Club
- In office 21 April 2021 – 16 December 2021
- Vice President: Alex Waislitz (April–May 2021)
- Co-Vice Presidents: Jodie Sizer (since May 2021); Paul Licuria (since May 2021)
- Preceded by: Eddie McGuire (Note: As president; himself and Peter Murphy as interim co-presidents.)
- Succeeded by: Jeff Browne

Co-President of the Collingwood Football Club
- Interim
- In office 10 February – 21 April 2021 Serving with Peter Murphy
- Preceded by: Eddie McGuire

Personal details
- Born: Mark Korda; 1957 (age 68–69)
- Children: 3
- Education: Whitefriars College, Donvale
- Alma mater: Swinburne University of Technology

Mark Korda is an Australian businessman and former president of the Collingwood Football Club. He is also co-founder of KordaMentha. Korda studied at Swinburne University of Technology and later received an honorary doctorate from the university.

== Collingwood Football Club president ==
Korda was appointed to the board of directors at the Collingwood Football Club in May 2007, after five years at his company, KordaMentha. Following the resignation of long-time President Eddie McGuire, Korda, along with Peter Murphy, took over as interim Co-Presidents on February 10, 2021 until the announcement of the next President. Korda was announced as the thirteenth president of the Collingwood Football Club on 21 April 2021. Korda, having been in the role for less than a month, saw his vice president at Collingwood, Alex Waislitz, resign effective immediately. His vacancy was filled by two co-vice-presidents, Indigenous businesswoman Jodie Sizer and former Collingwood player Paul Licuria. Former cyclist and medical practitioner Bridie O'Donnell was appointed to the board following Waislitz's resignation. On 15 September 2021, having been on the Collingwood board for 120 days, O'Donnell resigned effective immediately, citing the magnitude of the role. On 6 October 2021, Korda announced his resignation as president, but remained in the role until 16 December 2021.

== Notes ==
Preceded by Eddie McGuire	Collingwood Football Club; President; 2021–present	Succeeded by Incumbent
