= Bob Strachan (footballer, born 1886) =

Australian rules footballer

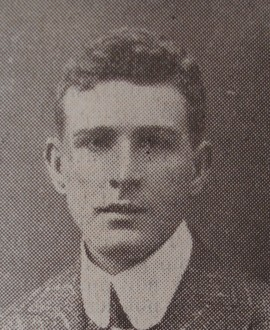

Personal information
- Full name: Robert William Sandeman Strachan
- Born: 21 May 1886; Melbourne, Victoria
- Died: 30 June 1927 (aged 41); Marble Bar, Western Australia
- Original team: Box Hill
- Height: 183 cm (6 ft 0 in)
- Weight: 80 kg (176 lb)

Playing career^{1}
Years	Club	Games (Goals)
1904–1910	Collingwood	52 (27)
- ^{1} Playing statistics correct to the end of 1910.

Robert William Sandeman Strachan (21 May 1886 – 30 June 1927) was an Australian rules footballer who played for Collingwood in the Victorian Football League (VFL). After attending Scotch College in Melbourne, Strachan joined Collingwood in 1904. Between 1904 and 1910 he played 52 VFL matches, including the 1905 Grand Final. Strachan died in Marble Bar, Western Australia in June 1927 after the fuel tank in his car exploded.
