= Alf Bartlett =

Australian rules footballer

Personal information
- Full name: Alfred John Bartlett
- Born: 7 July 1878; Kensington, England
- Died: 3 January 1926 (aged 47); Richmond, Victoria
- Original team: Fitzroy Crescent

Playing career^{1}
Years	Club	Games (Goals)
1901–1907	Fitzroy	79 (5)
- ^{1} Playing statistics correct to the end of 1907.

Career highlights
- VFL premiership player: 1904

Alfred John Bartlett (7 July 1878 – 3 January 1926) was an Australian rules footballer who played for the Fitzroy Football Club in the Victorian Football League (VFL).

== Sources ==
- Holmesby, Russell & Main, Jim (2009). The Encyclopedia of AFL Footballers. 8th ed. Melbourne: Bas Publishing.
- Alf Bartlett's playing statistics from AFL Tables
- Alf Bartlett at AustralianFootball.com
