= Jim Sharp (footballer) =

Australian rules footballer (1882–1945)

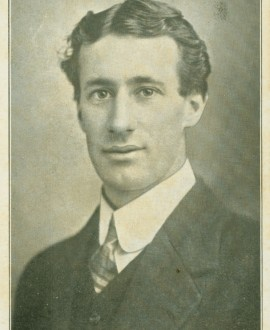

3rd President of the Collingwood Football Club
- In office 28 February 1914 – 24 September 1924
- Vice President: Alfred Cross, J. S. Sherrin, B. Crellin, J. J. Peppard, F. Baldie
- Preceded by: Alfred Cross
- Succeeded by: Harry Curtis

Personal details
- Born: James Sharp; 17 May 1882 Fitzroy, Victoria Colony, British Empire
- Died: 7 October 1945 (aged 63) Kew, Victoria, Australia
Australian rules football career
Personal information
- Original team: Fitzroy Crescent
- Height: 179 cm (5 ft 10 in)
- Weight: 83 kg (183 lb)
Playing career^{1}
Years	Club	Games (Goals)
1901–1910	Fitzroy	161 (43)
1911–12, 1917	Collingwood	18 (0)
Total		179 (43)
- ^{1} Playing statistics correct to the end of 1917.
Career highlights
- 2× VFL premiership player: 1904, 1905; Fitzroy captain: 1908–1910; Fitzroy Club Champion: 1904; Fitzroy leading goalkicker: 1907

Jim Sharp (17 May 1882 – 7 October 1945) was an Australian rules footballer who played for the Fitzroy Football Club and Collingwood Football Club in the Victorian Football League (VFL).

Sharp was a centre half-back and started his career in 1901 with Fitzroy, playing in premierships in 1904 and 1905. Sharp was the club's best and fairest winner in the 1904 VFL season and was voted best afield in the Grand Final that year. He captained both Fitzroy and the Victorian interstate team from 1908 to 1910, leading Victoria in the inaugural interstate championship series.

In 1911 Sharp crossed to Collingwood but broke his shin during his second season which ended his career. He stayed at Collingwood in an administrative capacity and in 1913 was elected club president. When a player failed to arrive at Geelong in time for a VFL game in 1917 Sharp filled in although an injury sustained soon after he took the field ensured he did not get much game time. He remained club president until 1923.
