= Jim Addison =

Australian rules footballer

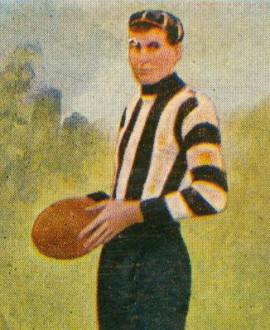
- Addison during his Collingwood career

Personal information
- Full name: James Russell Addison
- Born: 1 January 1884; Albert Park, Victoria
- Died: 2 May 1957 (aged 73); Kew, Victoria
- Original team: Leopold
- Debut: Round 17, 29 August 1903, Collingwood vs. Melbourne, at Victoria Park

Playing career^{1}
Years	Club	Games (Goals)
1903–1904	Collingwood	10 (4)
- ^{1} Playing statistics correct to the end of 1904.

Career highlights
- VFL premiership player: 1903

James Russell Addison (1 January 1884 – 2 May 1957) was an Australian rules footballer who played for the Collingwood Football Club in the Victorian Football League (VFL).

Addison played as a full-forward for Collingwood in only ten games over two seasons in the VFL. In only his third game, Addison won a premiership and was the only multiple goalkicker in Collingwood's Grand Final win against Fitzroy.

In 1904, Addison would play in seven more games, ending his VFL career with 10 games and 4 goals.

Addison moved to Williamstown in 1907 along with teammate Bert Reitman and both played in 'Town's 18-point premiership victory over West Melbourne, the first in Williamstown's history. Addison played with 'Town until the end of 1910, totalling 52 games and kicking 87 goals and was the Club leading goal scorer in 1909 with a total of 26.
