= Bob Boyle (footballer) =

Australian rules footballer and umpire

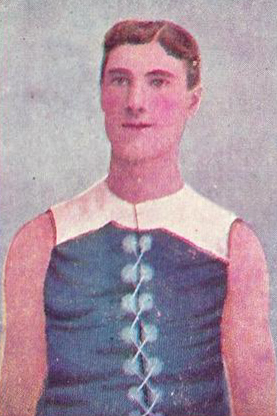
- Cigarette card of Boyle in 1905

Personal information
- Full name: Robert John McLean Boyle
- Born: 7 December 1876; North Melbourne, Victoria
- Died: 10 September 1927 (aged 50); Richmond, Victoria
- Original team: North Melbourne (VFA)
- Position: Centre

Playing career^{1}
Years	Club	Games (Goals)	
1904–1906	Carlton	36 (0)	

Umpiring career
Years	League	Role	Games
1907–1917	VFL	Field umpire	59
1907–1917	VFL	Boundary umpire	15
- ^{1} Playing statistics correct to the end of 1906.

Robert John McLean Boyle (7 December 1876 – 10 September 1927) was an Australian rules footballer who played with Carlton in the Victorian Football League (VFL).

Boyle, a half back flanker in North Melbourne's 1903 VFA premiership team, was used as a centreman during his time at Carlton. It was in that position that he appeared in their 1904 Grand Final loss and after losing his place in the side just one match into the 1906 season, thus missing out on that year's premiership, Boyle retired and took up umpiring.

He officiated in 59 VFL matches as a field umpire and 15 matches as a boundary umpire from 1907 to 1917. He was appointed to the 1916 VFL Grand Final on the boundary but chose to field umpire the final of the Ariah Park Association. He was replaced on the boundary by Bill Roy. Boyle was one of the umpires at the 1908 Melbourne Carnival.
