= Jack Davidson =

Australian rules footballer

Personal information
- Full name: David John Davidson
- Born: 10 May 1875; Bealiba, Victoria
- Died: 3 November 1952 (aged 77); Elsternwick, Victoria
- Original team: Albert Park

Playing career^{1}
| Years | Club | Games (Goals) | |
| 1898–99 | Melbourne | 10 (0) | |
| 1900 | South Melbourne | 7 (0) | |
| Total | | 17 (0) | |

Umpiring career
| Years | League | Role | Games |
| 1906 | VFL | Field umpire | 1 |
| | VFL | Boundary umpire | 44 |
- ^{1} Playing statistics correct to the end of 1900.

David John Davidson (10 May 1875 – 3 November 1952) was an Australian rules footballer who played for Melbourne and South Melbourne in the Victorian Football League (VFL).

Originally from Albert Park, Davidson had just three seasons in the VFL but later returned as a boundary umpire. He officiated in 44 matches, most notably the 1905 Grand Final, as well as field umpiring a match in the 1906 season.
