= Con McCormack =

Australian rules footballer

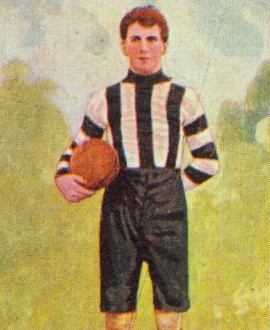
- McCormack during his career with Collingwood

Personal information
- Full name: Cornelius Joseph McCormack
- Born: 25 December 1877; Ballarat, Victoria
- Died: 8 September 1940 (aged 62); Sutherland, New South Wales
- Original team: Northcote Juniors
- Debut: Round 1, 1902, Collingwood vs. South Melbourne, at Lake Oval

Playing career^{1}
| Years | Club | Games (Goals) |
| 1902–1903 | Collingwood | 31 (0) |
- ^{1} Playing statistics correct to the end of 1903.

Career highlights
- 2× VFL premiership player: 1902, 1903

Cornelius Joseph "Con" McCormack (25 December 1877 – 8 September 1940) was an Australian rules footballer who played for the Collingwood Football Club in the Victorian Football League (VFL).

== Family ==
The son of John McCormack (1837–1892), and Susannah McCormack (1843–1927), née Casey, Cornelius Joseph McCormack was born at Ballarat, Victoria on 25 December 1877.

He married Amelia Sarah Burrell (1880–1959), in Melbourne, on 3 March 1903. They had five children; two girls and three boys (one of whom died in his infancy). Both of his surviving sons, John Charles "Jack" McCormack (1904–1996) and Eric Rowland McCormack (1905–1997), played First Grade rugby league football in the New South Wales Rugby Football League (NSWRFL) competition.

== Football ==
A centreman, McCormack was a premiership player in each of his two seasons at Collingwood. He experienced just three losses from his 31 games and in 1904 moved to Western Australia where he continued his football career.

== Death ==
He died at Sutherland, New South Wales on 8 September 1940.
