= KordaMentha =

Australian advisory and investment firm

- Type: Private company
- Industry: Professional services
- Founded: 2002; 24 years ago
- Founders: Mark Korda and Mark Mentha
- Headquarters: Melbourne, Australia
- Services: Corporate, forensic, investments, real estate, and restructuring consultancy
- Number of employees: 400 (2025)
- Website: www.kordamentha.com

KordaMentha is an Australian advisory firm that provides specialist restructuring, forensic accounting, real estate, and technology and data advisory services across more than a dozen industries. The business was co-founded in April 2002 by Mark Korda and Mark Mentha, for whom the firm is named.

KordaMentha has offices across Australia including Melbourne, Sydney, Brisbane, Perth, Canberra and Townsville, and has international offices in Auckland, Singapore, and Jakarta. The firm has further global reach, partnering with Alix Partners to execute on multi-territory projects. By 2025, the company had more than 70 partners and 600 staff across Australia and internationally.

KordaMentha provides specialist advisory services across an extensive range of business areas including Risk, Financial Crime, Technology and Data, Real Estate, Performance Improvement, Forensics, Major Projects, Restructuring and Cybersecurity, as well as Industry teams including Public Sector, Defence and National Security, Health, Education, Financial Services, Agriculture, Aviation and Transport, Energy and Natural Resources, Infrastructure, Leisure, Gaming and Hospitality, Media and Telecommunications, Real Estate and Construction and Retail and Consumer. Notable personnel include John Dewar (ex Vice-Vice Chancellor of La Trobe University).

== History ==
KordaMentha was founded in Melbourne in 2002 by Mark Korda and Mark Mentha, after the collapse of Arthur Andersen. While at Arthur Andersen, Korda and Mentha were appointed new Administrators of Ansett Airlines, and subsequently undertook the first and largest voluntary administration in Australia (Ansett Australia Group included 42 companies, 15,000 employees and >$1 billion assets). Since starting the business, the firm has also undertaken some of the largest Group of Voluntary Administrations in Australia (Stockford Limited with 84 companies) and more Voluntary Administrations than any other insolvency firm in Australia in 2003.

From 2003 to 2006, KordaMentha expanded its Australian footprint into Sydney and Perth. During this time, they established their Performance Improvement business, as well as 333 Capital which offers independent corporate advice to private business ownders and listed company clients across the public and private sectors.

Between 2007 and 2012, KordaMentha expanded into Asia via Singapore, and established their Forensic business, becoming one of the largest forensic groups in the Asia Pacific region.

In 2012, FTI Consulting acquired KordaMentha partner, KordaMentha (Qld), starting its financial advisory business in Australia.

From 2013 to 2019, KordaMentha established a property development group KM Develop and a Corporate Group. In 2017, KordaMentha expanded into unlisted commercial property funds management with the acquisition of Placer Property.

From 2020 to 2022, KordaMentha created Financial Crime and Cyber Security offerings. The firm represented the advisory and consulting sector at the Senate committee hearing into Anti-Money Laundering and Counter-Terrorism Financing in 2024.

In 2022, it announced 12 new partners, which numbered its total partnership to 66.

In April 2024, Bonza engaged KordaMentha to review its operations amid financial challenges.

In January 2025, KordaMentha established a Defence & National Security practice, appointing former KPMG partners Mike Kalms and Joshua Rodgers as joint leaders.

In February 2025, KordaMentha was appointed by the South Australian government as the administrator of OneSteel Manufacturing Pty Ltd. OneSteel is part of the GFG corporate group and is the legal entity that owns and operates the Whyalla steelworks and associated mines. This is the second time KordaMentha has been involved with the steel works, having been appointed administrator for Arrium, the previous owner of Whyalla steelworks, in 2016.

== Major engagements ==
- Ansett Australia Trade-on Administration of Australia's No. 2 airline with annual turnover of $3.2 billion. Proceeds from business and asset sales are estimated to total $1 billion.
- Air Australia
- Cross City Tunnel
- Oracle
- NBN
- Arrium
- Fitness First
- Network 10
- Virgin Australia
- Victorian TAFE
- Board of Victorian Schools
- Defence Housing Australia
