= Percy Sheehan =

Australian rules footballer

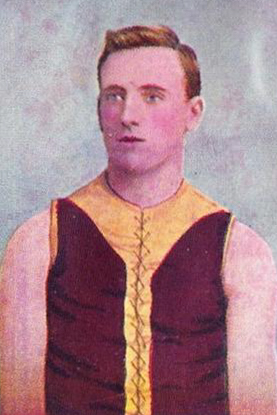
- Cigarette card of Sheehan in 1905

Personal information
- Full name: Henry Percival Sheehan
- Born: 5 July 1883; Collingwood, Victoria
- Died: 30 May 1946 (aged 62); Malvern East, Victoria
- Original team: Caulfield Juniors

Playing career^{1}
Years	Club	Games (Goals)
1904–1909	Fitzroy	58 (11)
1910	Carlton	16 (0)
1912	Richmond	4 (0)
Total		78 (11)
- ^{1} Playing statistics correct to the end of 1912.

Career highlights
- 2× VFL premiership player: 1904, 1905

Henry Percival Sheehan (5 July 1883 – 30 May 1946) was an Australian rules footballer who played for the Fitzroy Football Club, Carlton Football Club and Richmond Football Club in the Victorian Football League (VFL).

Originally from local side Caulfield Juniors, Sheehan made his senior VFL debut in 1904 and was a member of Fitzroy premiership teams that year and 1905. Shehan played in a variety of positions during his career but was used mostly as a half back flanker. In 1910 he left the club and moved to Carlton, finishing the season with a Grand Final loss to Collingwood Football Club. The game was full of brawls and Sheehan, who was seen as one of the main instigators, was suspended for a season and a half (28 games). When his suspension ended in 1912 he returned to the VFL with Richmond but could only manage four games before retiring.
