= Dick Gibson (footballer) =

Australian rules footballer (1866–1943)

Personal information
- Full name: Richard Gibson
- Nickname: Hockey
- Born: 13 July 1866; Williamstown, Victoria
- Died: 28 October 1943 (aged 77); Ascot Vale, Victoria

Playing career^{1}
| Years | Club | Games (Goals) | |
| 1886–1890 | Hotham/North Melbourne (VFA) | 71 (28) | |
| 1891–1896 | South Melbourne (VFA) | 115 (25) | |
| 1897–1898 | South Melbourne (VFL) | 29 (9) | |
| Total | | 215 (62) | |

Umpiring career
| Years | League | Role | Games |
| 1899–1909 | VFL | Field umpire | 98 |
| 1905–1909 | VFL | Boundary umpire | 3 |
- ^{1} Playing statistics correct to the end of 1898.

Richard Gibson (13 July 1866 – 28 October 1943) was an Australian rules footballer who played with Hotham/North Melbourne and South Melbourne, and later an umpire in the Victorian Football League (VFL).

== Family ==
The son of George Thomas Gibson (1828–1879), and Margaret Gibson (1837–1882), née Slaven, Richard Gibson was born at Williamstown, Victoria on 13 July 1866.

He married Abigail Mary Snow (1868–1936) on 23 July 1890.

== Footballer ==
After playing for North Melbourne and South Melbourne in the VFA, Dick "Hockey" Gibson was a member of the inaugural South Melbourne VFL team in 1897 and vice-captained the club in his two VFL seasons.

== Umpire ==
In 1902, Gibson umpired the Metropolitan Junior Football Association (MJFA) grand final between Collegians and Brighton.

He became the first VFL player to umpire a Grand Final in 1903 when he was the field umpire for the 1903 VFL Grand Final. In all he officiated in 98 VFL matches as a field umpire and also appeared as a boundary umpire three times.

== Death ==
He died at his home in Ascot Vale, Victoria on 28 October 1943.

== See also ==
- 1908 Melbourne Carnival
