= Vin Coutie =

Australian rules footballer

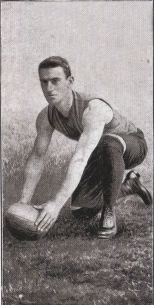
- Coutie before or during 1911, seen here doing a place kick, a skill made entirely obsolete by the mid-20th century

Personal information
- Full name: Arthur Vincent Coutie
- Born: 28 October 1881; South Melbourne, Victoria
- Died: 17 June 1951 (aged 69); Sandringham, Victoria
- Original team: Leopold

Playing career^{1}
Years	Club	Games (Goals)
1901–1911	Melbourne	152 (212)
- ^{1} Playing statistics correct to the end of 1911.

Career highlights
- Melbourne leading goalkicker: 1903, 1904, 1908; VFL leading goalkicker: 1904; Melbourne captain: 1907, 1910–1911

Arthur Vincent "Vin" Coutie (28 October 1881 – 17 June 1951) was an Australian rules footballer who played for Melbourne in the Victorian Football League (VFL) during the early 1900s.

A forward, Coutie topped the VFL's goalkicking in 1904 with 39 goals and became the first Melbourne player to achieve this distinction. Coutie was also the leading goalkicker at Melbourne in 1903 and 1908. He twice kicked eight goals in a game in his career, firstly in 1904 against Geelong and again in 1908 against St Kilda.

Coutie was a Victorian interstate representative in 1903 and 1904. He captained Melbourne in 1907 before being given the job again for the 1910 and 1911 seasons.
