= Jack McDonough =

Australian rules footballer

Personal information
- Full name: John Martin McDonough
- Born: 26 July 1879; Collingwood, Victoria
- Died: 23 February 1955 (aged 75); Camberwell, Victoria
- Original team: Celtic

Playing career^{1}
Years	Club	Games (Goals)
1902–1903	South Melbourne	21 (3)
1904–1905	Fitzroy	29 (6)
Total		50 (9)
- ^{1} Playing statistics correct to the end of 1905.

Career highlights
- 2× VFL premiership player: 1904, 1905

John Martin McDonough (26 July 1879 – 23 February 1955) was an Australian rules footballer who played for the South Melbourne Football Club and Fitzroy Football Club in the Victorian Football League (VFL).

== Football ==
McDonough was a forward and started his brief VFL career in 1902 at South Melbourne. After managing 21 games over two seasons he crossed to Fitzroy where he enjoyed team success, playing in two premiership sides.
