= Eddie Prescott =

Australian rules footballer

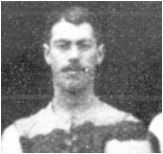
- Prescott in 1904

Personal information
- Full name: Edward Charles Prescott
- Born: 9 December 1880; Melbourne, Victoria
- Died: 21 June 1919 (aged 38); South Melbourne, Victoria
- Original team: Williamstown

Playing career^{1}
Years	Club	Games (Goals)
1904	Carlton	11 (9)
- ^{1} Playing statistics correct to the end of 1904.

Edward Charles Prescott (9 December 1880 – 21 June 1919) was an Australian rules footballer who played with Carlton in the Victorian Football League (VFL).

== Family ==
The son of Charles Edward Prescott, and Minnie Prescott, née Keily, Edward Charles Prescott was born in Melbourne on 9 December 1880.

== Football ==
=== Wiiliamstown (VFA) ===
He played for Williamstown Football Club in the Victorian Football Association (VFA) in 1902 and 1903.

=== Carlton (VFL) ===
In June 1904 the VFA permit committee refused to grant Prescott a clearance to transfer from Williamstown to North Melbourne (which at the time, was also a VFA club); however, several weeks later it granted Prescott a clearance to play with Carlton in the Victorian Football League (VFL).

In his single season with Carlton (1904), he played in 11 games and kicked 9 goals, and his last match was in the 1904 Grand Final against Fitzroy on 17 September 1904, in which he kicked one of Carlton's five goals (Carlton lost to Fitzroy: 5.7 (37) to 9.7 (61)).

== Death ==
He died at South Melbourne, Victoria on 21 June 1919.
