= Billy Leeds =

Australian rules footballer and umpire

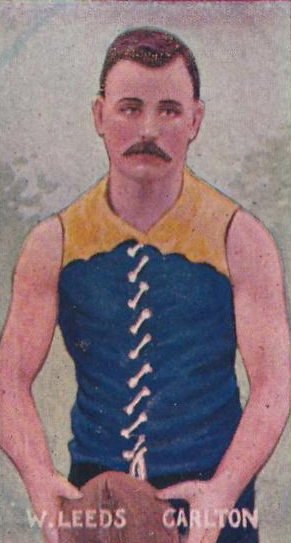
- Cigarette card of Leeds in 1906

Personal information
- Full name: William Edward Michael Leeds
- Born: 4 April 1880; Carlton, Victoria
- Died: 6 April 1955 (aged 75); Carlton, Victoria
- Original team: Brunswick
- Position: Forward/Defender

Playing career^{1}
Years	Club	Games (Goals)
1903–1905	Carlton	27 (14)
- ^{1} Playing statistics correct to the end of 1905.

William Edward Michael Leeds (4 April 1880 – 6 April 1955) was an Australian rules footballer who played with Carlton in the Victorian Football League (VFL).

Leeds, who could play both forward and down back, had his first season for Carlton in 1903 but then retired to pursue an umpiring career. After officiating in two games early in the 1904 VFL season, Carlton lured him back to the club to fill a gap left by injuries and he starred from the half back flank in their semi-final win over Essendon. He also played in their losing Grand Final that year which makes him the only league footballer to umpire a match and appear in a Grand Final in the same season.
