= Frank Abbott (footballer) =

Australian rules footballer

Stewart Abbott
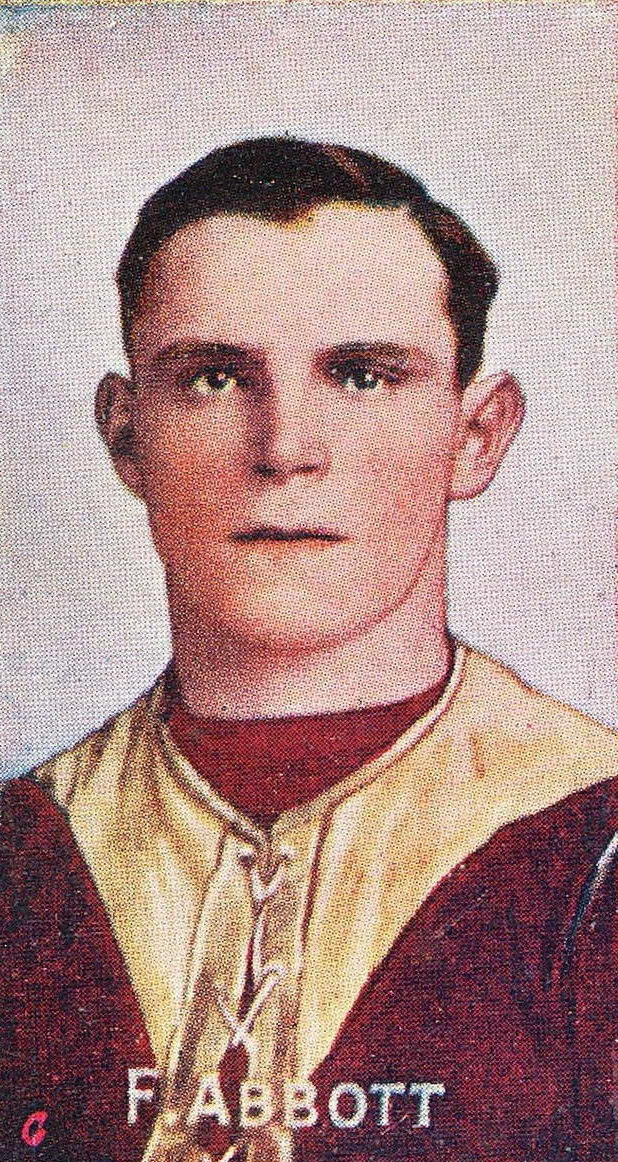
- Cigarette card of Abbott in 1908

Personal information
- Full name: Stewart Phillip Abbott
- Born: 6 July 1885; Fitzroy, Victoria
- Died: 4 August 1947 (aged 62); Parkville, Victoria
- Original team: Fitzroy Juniors

Playing career^{1}
| Years | Club | Games (Goals) |
| 1906–07, 1912 | Fitzroy | 31 (4) |
| 1909–10 | Essendon A (VFA) | 33 (67) |
- ^{1} Playing statistics correct to the end of 1912.

Stewart Phillip "Frank" Abbott (6 July 1885 – 4 August 1947) was an Australian rules footballer who played with Fitzroy. In between his two stints for Fitzroy, he played for Essendon Town in the VFA.
