= Thomas Beacham (footballer) =

Australian rules footballer and umpire

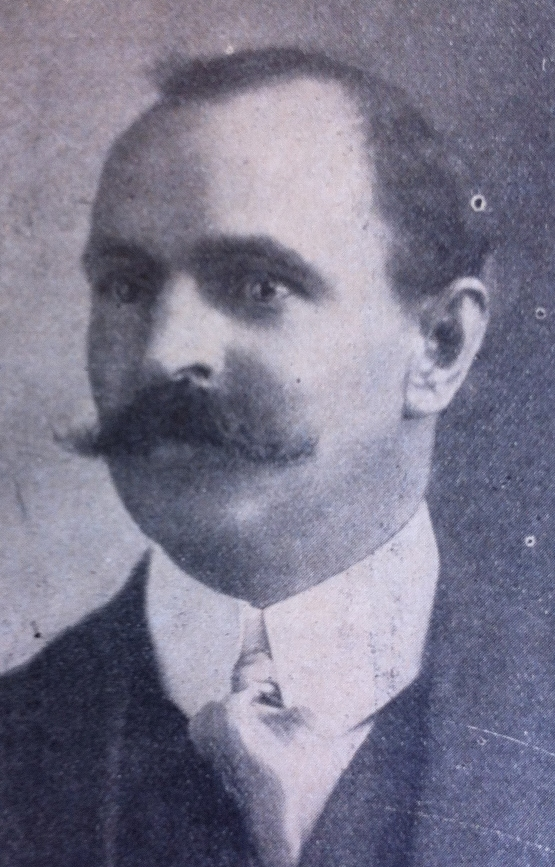

Personal information
- Full name: Thomas Beacham
- Born: 12 August 1878; Collingwood, Victoria
- Died: 1 September 1947 (aged 69); Fitzroy North, Victoria
- Original team: Collingwood Juniors
- Position: Centreman

Playing career^{1}
Years	Club	Games (Goals)	
1899–1903, 1905–08	Fitzroy	134 (12)	
1904	Norwood	7 (1)	

Umpiring career
Years	League	Role	Games
1909 1909–12	VFL; VFL	Field; Boundary	7; 4
- ^{1} Playing statistics correct to the end of 1908.

Career highlights
- VFL premiership player: 1905

Thomas Beacham (12 August 1878 – 1 September 1947) was an Australian rules footballer who played for the Fitzroy Football Club and also umpired during the early years of the Victorian Football League (VFL). He went by the alias Tammy Beauchamp during much of his football career.

== Playing career ==
A Collingwood junior, Beacham spent his entire career as a centreman. He debuted with Fitzroy late in 1899 and played the final two home and away matches but, despite being noted as "quick and smart", was omitted for the sectional matches and the grand final.

Over the following four seasons Beacham became a useful member of a successful Fitzroy side. As regular finalists they were upset in the 1900 grand final and knocked out in the semi and final matches in 1901 and 1902 respectively. During this period Beacham represented the VFL against South Australia in both 1901 and 1902. Often noted for his pace and creativity he provided drive into the forward line for the likes of Percy Trotter and Gerald Brosnan.

The 1903 grand final proved another disappointment. With seconds remaining Fitzroy had drawn within three points of Collingwood. From the centre Beacham passed to Trotter who then hit the reliable Brosnan in range. The shot was just off-line and the siren rang leaving Collingwood premiers by two points.

In October 1903 Beacham moved to Adelaide and here the spelling of his surname first appears as Beauchamp. He originally resided in Sturt tying him residentially to that football club. Just prior to the season he moved to East Torrens with a view to playing for Norwood. A permit was granted but subsequently rescinded on an appeal from Sturt thus delaying Beacham's Norwood debut by a month.

Once able to take the field he was appointed vice-captain and played effectively until a knee injury late in the season kept him out for some weeks. Selected under a fitness cloud for the final against Souths he lasted only until quarter-time before having to leave the game when his knee gave way. Sportingly Souths allowed a substitute and Norwood managed a three-point win.

Returning to Melbourne in 1905 he rejoined Fitzroy, who were now defending premiers, and had the only premiership success of his senior career. As they had been through the season, Beacham, Barclay Bailes and Trotter were the driving forces in the grand final.

The media universally rated Bailes as best afield followed by Beacham who was opposed to Jock McHale on the day. This was an opinion shared by captain Brosnan who told noted, "we beat them chiefly across the centre where young Bailes and Beauchamp (sic) were very fine in their work". At the club's annual meeting the following March Beacham was also named by his team mates as one of the sides most consistent players for the year.

Beacham played well in the 1906 VFL Grand Final loss to Carlton and maintained reasonable form over the next two seasons but Fitzroy's form declined and they missed the finals in 1907 and 1908. Beacham played his last VFL match in the 1908 final round win over Melbourne.

In 1996 Beacham was one of ten nominations for a position on the centreline in Fitzroy's Team of the Century but was not selected in the final team.

== Umpiring career ==
Following his playing career Beacham successfully applied for a position as a VFL field umpire. He was appointed to VFL senior football immediately the season began and officiated at the Essendon versus St.Kilda in the opening round. He was awarded Heritage Number 44. The following week he was appointed as a boundary umpire for Melbourne versus Essendon earning Heritage Number 49 for that discipline.

Over the course of 1909 he was appointed to 8 VFL matches - 7 field, 1 boundary. When not umpiring in the VFL he was regularly appointed to country competitions including the mid-week Goulburn Valley league. He finished the season with the first semi-final of the Goulburn Valley Football Association.

From 1910–1912 Beacham was appointed to four VFL matches on the boundary and only officiated as a field umpire in the country. He umpired grand finals in the Peninsula Football Association (1911) and Bright District (1911). Beacham retired at the end of the 1913 season having umpired 12 VFL and 78 country matches.

== Umpires' association ==
Beacham was elected to the executive committee of the VFL Umpires' Association in 1913.
