= Gerald Brosnan =

Australian rules footballer and coach

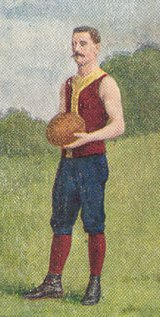

Personal information
- Full name: Gerald Brosnan
- Born: 14 August 1877; Lethbridge, Victoria
- Died: 29 July 1965 (aged 87); Kew, Victoria
- Original team: Ballarat
- Height: 175 cm (5 ft 9 in)
- Weight: 76 kg (168 lb)
- Position: Centre half forward

Playing career^{1}
Years	Club	Games (Goals)
1894	Geelong (VFA)	2 (0)
1895	Essendon (VFA)	4 (0)
1896–1899	Ballarat	
1900–1909	Fitzroy	131 (160)
Total		137 (160)

Representative team honours^{2}
Years	Team	Games (Goals)
1900–1904	Victoria	3 (8)

Coaching career^{3}
Years	Club	Games (W–L–D)
1910–1912, 1914	University	72 (12–60–0)
1920	Melbourne	16 (5–11–0)
Total		88 (17–71–0)
- ^{1} Playing statistics correct to the end of 1909.^{2} Representative statistics correct as of 1904.^{3} Coaching statistics correct as of 1920.

Career highlights
- 2× VFL premiership player: 1904, 1905; Fitzroy leading goalkicker: 1901; Fitzroy captain: 1903–1905

Gerald Brosnan (14 August 1877 – 29 July 1965) was an Australian rules footballer who played for the Fitzroy Football Club in the early years of the Victorian Football League (VFL). He played as a key position forward and had an accurate left foot kick.

== Family ==
Jeremiah Brosnan was born to Irish immigrants Patrick Brosnan and Ellen Berryman in 1877, however for most his adult life he used the name Gerald.

== Football ==
Brosnan originally tried out with Geelong in 1894 and Essendon in 1895 but was let go by both sides. He then moved to Ballarat Football Club in 1896, playing for them until 1899. Buoyed by his good form for Ballarat, Brosnan decided to make another attempt at a VFL career and joined Fitzroy. Brosnan made his league debut in the 1900 VFL season and in his second season Brosnan won their Leading Goalkicker Award with 33 goals.

Brosnan became club captain in 1903, leading Fitzroy to the 1903 VFL Grand Final, losing by two points. In the dying seconds he had a chance to win the game after marking a pass from teammate Percy Trotter thirty metres out from goal. The ball just grazed the outside of the goal post, and the final bell sounded immediately afterwards.

Fitzroy however won premierships in 1904 and 1905, meaning that when Brosnan left the captaincy at the end of the 1905 VFL season he had led the club to the Grand Final in each of his three seasons in charge.

== Interstate representative ==
Brosnan also captained Victoria in interstate matches before his retirement in 1909.

== Coach ==
Brosnan also had three unsuccessful coaching stints; from 1910 to 1912 and 1914 he coached University Football Club for 72 games but only twelve wins, and in 1920, Brosnan coached Melbourne Football Club for five wins in 16 matches.

== Sports journalist ==
Following his coaching career Brosnan became a well-respected football writer.

== See also ==
- 1916 Pioneer Exhibition Game

== Sources ==
- Atkinson, G. (1982) Everything you ever wanted to know about Australian rules football but couldn't be bothered asking, The Five Mile Press: Melbourne. ISBN 0 86788 009 0.
- Donald, Chris (2005). Fitzroy: For the Love of the Jumper. Pan Australia. pp. 34–35. ISBN 9781877029189.
