= Harry Pears =

Australian rules footballer

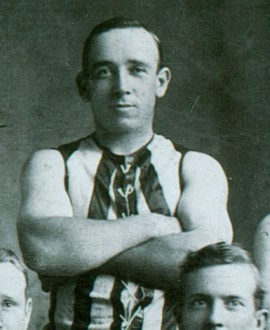
- Pears in 1906

Personal information
- Full name: Henry Ross Pears
- Born: 28 July 1877; Geelong, Victoria
- Died: 20 April 1912 (aged 34); Melbourne, Victoria
- Original team: Port Melbourne
- Debut: Round 1, 1902, Collingwood vs. South Melbourne, at Lake Oval

Playing career^{1}
Years	Club	Games (Goals)
1902–1908	Collingwood	95 (78)
- ^{1} Playing statistics correct to the end of 1908.

Career highlights
- 2× VFL premiership player: 1902, 1903

Henry Ross Pears (28 July 1877 – 20 April 1912) was an Australian rules footballer who played for the Collingwood Football Club in the Victorian Football League (VFL).

== Family ==
The son of Thomas Charles Pears (1825-1883), and Catherine "Kate" Pears (1849-1930), née Mahoney, Henry Ross Pears was born in Geelong on 28 July 1877.

== Football ==
Although primarily a half forward flanker and forward pocket, Pears (known as "Midget") also spent some time as a rover.

=== Port Melbourne (VFA) ===
He played 33 Games (27 goals) for Port Melbourne over four seasons (1898-1901).

=== Collingwood (VFL) ===
He played 95 Games (78 goals) for Collingwood over seven seasons (1898-1901).

He kicked seven goals in a game against Geelong in his debut season and was a member of Collingwood's 1902 and 1903 premiership teams. Pears also played in a losing Grand Final in 1905.

=== Brunswick (VFA) ===
In July 1908, he was cleared from Collingwood to Brunswick, and went on to play 35 Games (14 goals) for Brunswick over three seasons (1908-1910).

== Death ==
Pears died on 20 April 1912, after playing a pre-season game for Port Melbourne.
