= George Bruce (footballer) =

Australian rules footballer

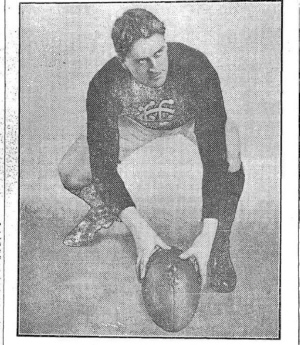
- Bruce during his Carlton career

Personal information
- Born: 5 August 1879; Adelaide, South Australia
- Died: 5 June 1928 (aged 48); Carlton, Victoria
- Original team: West Adelaide (SAFL)
- Debut: Round 5, 1903, Carlton vs. South Melbourne, at Lake Oval
- Height: 174 cm (5 ft 9 in)
- Weight: 74 kg (163 lb)

Playing career^{1}
Years	Club	Games (Goals)
1898–1902	West Adelaide (SAFL)	43 (1)
1903–1913	Carlton (VFL)	181 (30)

Representative team honours
Years	Team	Games (Goals)
1900-1902	South Australia	
1905, 1908	Victoria	
- ^{1} Playing statistics correct to the end of 1913.

George Bruce (5 August 1879 – 5 June 1928) was an Australian rules footballer who played with Carlton in the Victorian Football League (VFL) during the 1900s.

== Family ==
The son of George Bruce (1843-1922), and Annie Bruce (1846-1929), née Gaston, George Bruce was born in Adelaide, South Australia on 5 August 1879. Bruce's older brothers, Jim and Percy, also played for West Adelaide.

He married Grace Bennett Murie (1881-1945) on 4 August 1908. They had three children: Grace, George, and Donald.

== Football ==
George Bruce, of Carlton, was the first player to introduce the tricky dodge of bending down, touching the ball on the ground, and then shooting past the man playing against him. Many have imitated him, but none has equalled him in this move. — The Herald, 1 August 1913.

=== West Adelaide (SAFL) ===
A wingman, he played in 43 matches for the South Australian Football League club West Adelaide over five seasons.

He represented South Australia in 1900, 1901, and 1902.

=== Carlton (VFL) ===
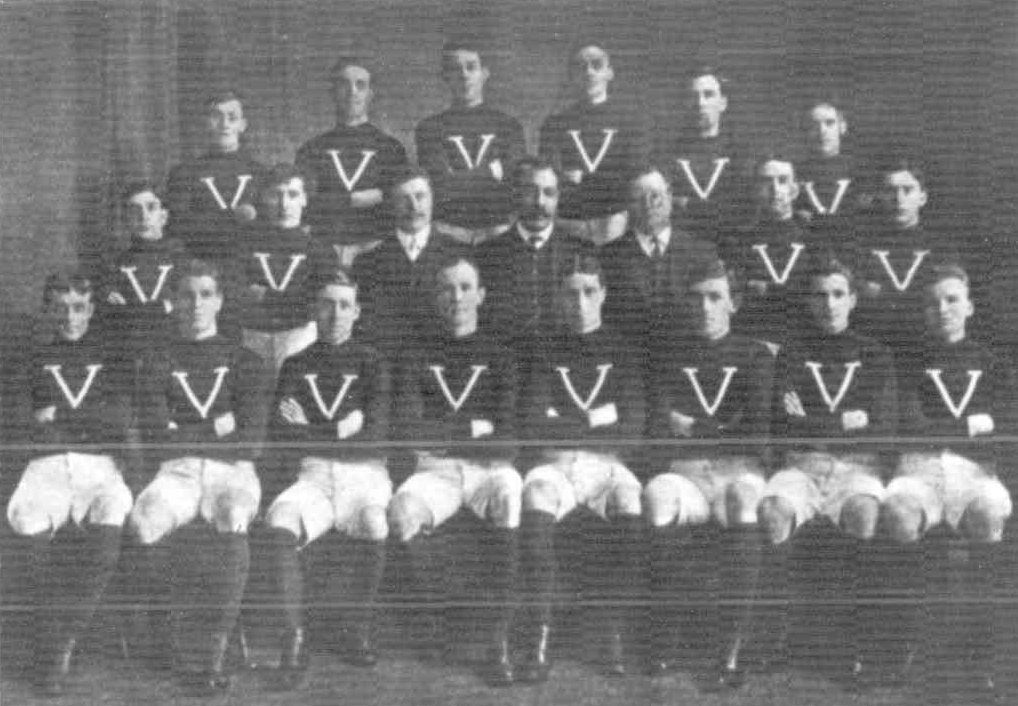
1908 Victorian Carnival team George Bruce is at far right, back row.

Bruce was cleared to Carlton from West Adelaide in 1903.

He was a member of three successive premiership sides: 1906, 1907, and 1908.

He represented Victoria in 1905, and at the 1908 Jubilee Carnival.

== Hall of Fame ==
In 2006 he was inducted into the Carlton Football Club's Hall of Fame.

== Death ==
He died at Carlton, Victoria on 5 June 1928.

== See also ==
- 1908 Melbourne Carnival
- Touching the ball on the ground
