= Bob Smith (Australian footballer, born 1877) =

Australian rules footballer'

Personal information
- Full name: Robert Tait Smith
- Born: 23 November 1877; Nerring, Victoria
- Died: 25 February 1939 (aged 61); Caulfield, Victoria
- Original team: Melbourne Teacher's College

Playing career^{1}
Years	Club	Games (Goals)
1901–03, 1906–09	Fitzroy	74 (33)
- ^{1} Playing statistics correct to the end of 1909.

Robert Tait Smith (23 November 1877 – 25 February 1939) was an Australian rules footballer who played with Fitzroy in the Victorian Football League.
