= George Green (Australian rules footballer) =

Australian rules footballer

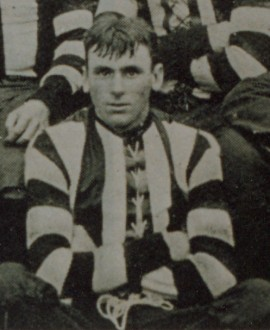
- Green during his career with Collingwood

Personal information
- Full name: Alfred George Green
- Born: 5 August 1882; Port Melbourne, Victoria
- Died: 24 December 1949 (aged 67); Bundoora, Victoria
- Original team: Port Rovers
- Position: Wingman

Playing career^{1}
Years	Club	Games (Goals)
1903–1908	Collingwood	76 (16)
- ^{1} Playing statistics correct to the end of 1908.

Alfred George Green (5 August 1882 – 24 December 1949) was an Australian rules footballer who played with Collingwood in the Victorian Football League (VFL).

Green, a wingman, joined Collingwood in 1903 when they were reigning premiers. He broke into the side in the second round of the season and the club won each of the 13 games that he played in that year, but Green missed the finals where they claimed back to back premierships. In 1905 he made his first Grand Final appearance and played on the wing in the loss to Fitzroy.

After retiring as a player, Green turned to umpiring and was a boundary umpire in the 1918 VFL Grand Final, which Collingwood took part in.
