= Gilbert Barker =

Australian rules footballer, born 1882

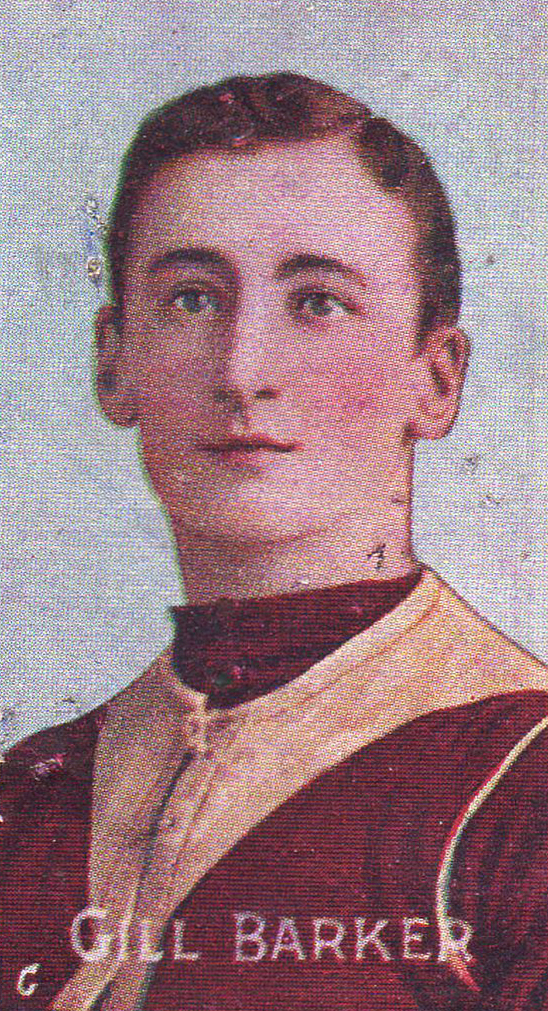
- Cigarette card of Barker in 1908

Personal information
- Full name: Gilbert William Barker
- Born: 30 July 1882; South Melbourne, Victoria
- Died: 6 September 1952 (aged 70); Perth, Western Australia
- Original team: Wesley College

Playing career^{1}
Years	Club	Games (Goals)
1904–1906	Fitzroy	42 (4)
1908	University	6 (2)
Total		48 (6)
- ^{1} Playing statistics correct to the end of 1908.

Career highlights
- 2× VFL premiership player: 1904, 1905

Gilbert William Barker (30 July 1882 – 6 September 1952) was an Australian rules footballer who played for the Fitzroy Football Club and University Football Club in the Victorian Football League (VFL).

An ex-Wesley College player, In his debut season Gilbert was part of the 1904 Fitzroy Premiership side on the half-forward flank. He then moved into the midfield for the rest of his career with Fitzroy, before playing back at half-forward in University's first year operating in the league.

Barker graduated as a doctor in mid 1908 and returned to Perth where he had spent 1907 as a trainee doctor.

He married Emma Lilly Keune in 1911 and they had three children. Barker died in 1952 after a long career as a surgeon in Perth.
