= Eddie McGuire =

Australian media personality and television host (born 1964)

Eddie McGuire AM
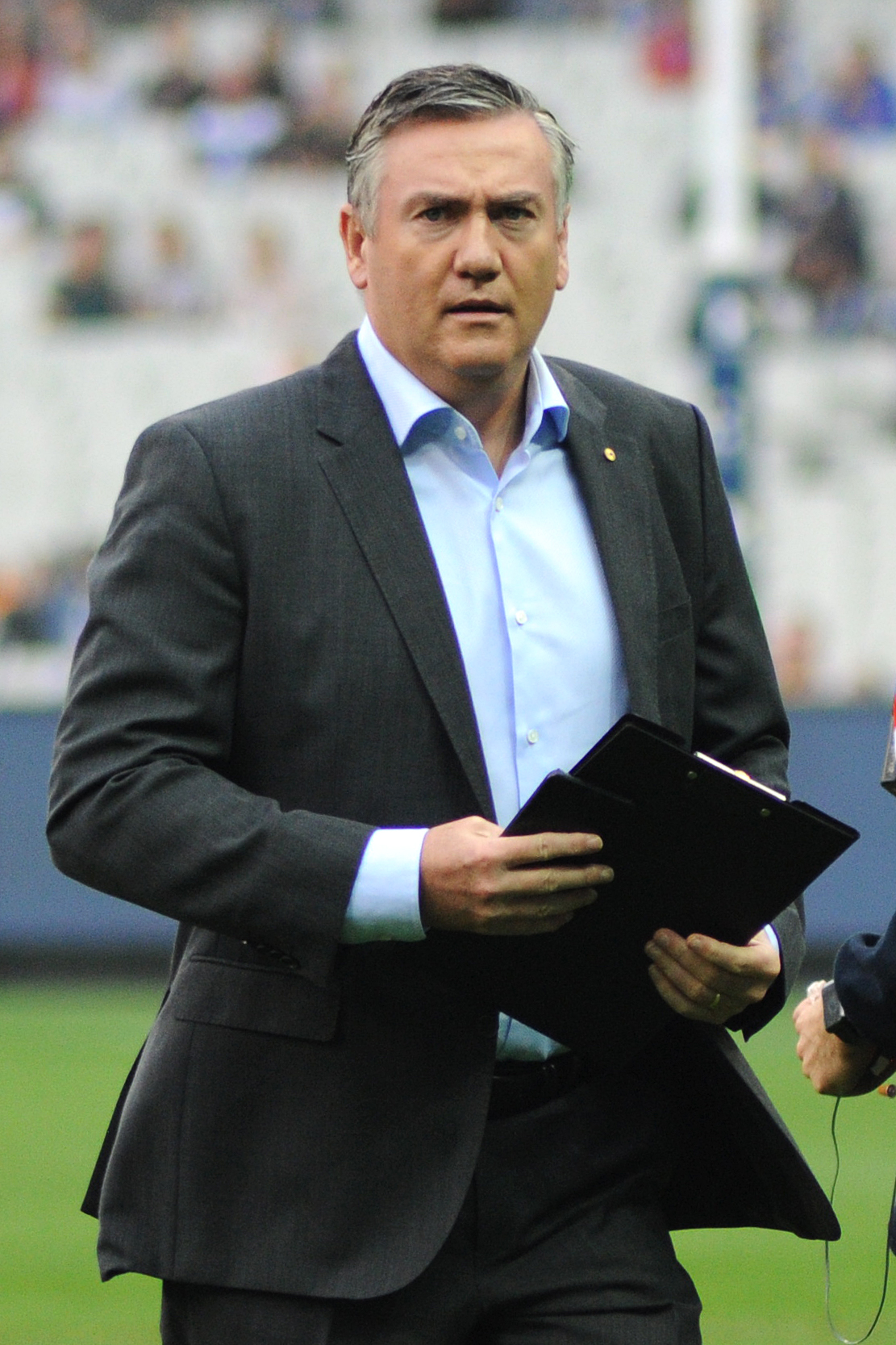
- McGuire in April 2018

President of the Collingwood Football Club
- In office 29 October 1998 – 9 February 2021
- Preceded by: Kevin Rose
- Succeeded by: Mark Korda

CEO of Nine Network
- In office 13 January 2006 – 30 June 2007
- Preceded by: David Gyngell
- Succeeded by: David Gyngell

President of the Melbourne Stars
- In office 27 July 2011 – 31 May 2019
- Preceded by: Position established
- Succeeded by: Position dissolved (Note: The Melbourne Stars were integrated into Cricket Victoria, effectively dissolving McGuire's position.)

Personal details
- Born: Edward Joseph McGuire; 29 October 1964 (age 62) Carlton, Victoria, Australia
- Relatives: Frank McGuire (brother); Brigette McGuire (sister); Xander McGuire (son)
- Education: Christian Brothers College
- Occupation: Broadcaster; commentator; businessman

Edward Joseph McGuire (born 29 October 1964) is an Australian television and radio presenter, journalist, Australian Football League commentator and former TV executive. He is also an occasional Herald Sun newspaper columnist. He hosted Nine Network's Who Wants to Be a Millionaire? and later its spin-off, Millionaire Hot Seat from 2009 to 2023, Wednesday night episodes of Footy Classified, and Network 10's coverage of the Melbourne Cup Carnival (since 2022).

McGuire is the former president of the Collingwood Football Club; he stood down in 2021 after criticism of his handling of a report outlining systemic racism and involvement in racism at the club. He has worked in sports journalism, sports broadcasting and as a game show host. McGuire previously hosted Nine Network's the Footy Show from its first airing in March 1994 until his departure in 2006. He returned for two years in 2017, leaving upon the show's termination in 2018, prior to its short-lived reformat.

He hosted Australia's edition of the game show Who Wants to Be a Millionaire? and, previously, 1 vs. 100. He is a former Nine Network CEO, resigning on 30 June 2007. He returned to commentating Friday night football in August 2007 contractually with Melbourne radio station SEN 1116, commentating one match a round. He is a director at the Victorian Major Events Company. He formerly hosted Triple M Melbourne's breakfast show The Hot Breakfast. His son, Xander, is a journalist and media commentator.

== Biography ==
=== Early life ===
McGuire was born one of four to parents Edward McGuire Snr. and Bridie Brennan, who had emigrated in 1958 from Scotland and Ireland, respectively. His father worked in the coal mines before serving in World War II, before the family settled and in the Melbourne suburb of Broadmeadows. He and his older brother Frank McGuire both won scholarships to Christian Brothers' College, St Kilda.

== Media career ==
McGuire's brother Frank who worked as a newspaper sports reporter, helped him to get his first job in the media as an Australian Rules Football statistician and cricket reporter for The Herald (1978–1982). In 1982, Eddie joined Network Ten as a cadet sports reporter for Ten’s Eyewitness News. He remained at Ten until 1993 when he moved to the Nine Network where he became the host of a sports variety program.

In 1994, McGuire became one of the hosts of the AFL version of The Footy Show. He was initially on the show until 2005, later returning several times.

McGuire's role at Nine was further expanded in 1999 when he became the host of the Australian version of Who Wants to Be a Millionaire?, a franchise of the globally exported television quiz show. In the same year he also hosted the Sydney New Year's Eve 1999–2000 telecast. He hosted Who Wants to Be a Millionaire? from its première on 18 April 1999 until 3 April 2006. He briefly returned to the show after an 18-month hiatus in 2007 and has occasionally hosted a number of special episodes since then.

McGuire hosted the annual Australian Logie Awards show in 2003 and 2004 and co-hosted in 2005.

In January 2007, McGuire returned to regular hosting on the Australian version of the 1 vs. 100 quiz show.

On 9 June 2008, McGuire temporarily hosted A Current Affair while regular host Tracy Grimshaw was on leave. This saw the ratings of the show increase, with 1.42 million viewers tuning in to watch on his first night of hosting. Rival program Today Tonight still eclipsed ACA with 1.470 million viewers. However, the ratings for ACA slumped to 1.217 million viewers the following Tuesday, while Today Tonight achieved 1.549 million viewers. In February 2009, McGuire hosted a telethon for the victims of the Victorian bushfires. From April 2009 to November 2023, McGuire hosted the teatime game show Millionaire Hot Seat program, which aired at 5:00 pm. He also hosted a fundraising telethon from Brisbane on 9 January 2011 for victims of the 2010–2011 Queensland floods alongside Leila McKinnon and Karl Stefanovic at Suncorp Piazza.

In early 2011, McGuire hosted another prime time quiz show, The Million Dollar Drop, lasting for only six episodes. He then became the host of the sports-themed quiz show Between the Lines. His return was short-lived when the show quickly failed in the ratings, being axed by Nine after only three episodes had been aired. The fourth and final episode was broadcast on 2 June 2011. During 2011, he hosted This is Your Life; however, the show did not return in 2012.

in 2012, McGuire joined Fox Footy in an AFL commentary and program panellist role, while still remaining at the Nine Network to host Millionaire Hot Seat and the station's Olympic coverage.

In July 2017, amid poor ratings, McGuire returned to The Footy Show, replacing Craig Hutchison, alongside long-time co-host Sam Newman and Rebecca Maddern. His company, JAM TV, produced the show. In 2018, he co-hosted the show with Newman. In December 2018, McGuire announced that The Footy Show was to be replaced by a new format of the show in 2019. The show was cancelled in 2019 after a number of episodes.

In June 2020, McGuire debuted an AFL radio show for American audiences called Aussie Football Rules America with Eddie McGuire accompanied by an AFL match of the week on SiriusXM satellite radio (specifically, Dan Patrick Radio, the channel hosted by the SportsCenter anchor and radio host).

On radio, McGuire has been a football radio caller at Triple M, a station which had previously concentrated on rock music. Rejoining the station in 2009, he co-hosted a breakfast radio show with former AFL footballer Luke Darcy. The show became known as Triple M's Hot Breakfast, however, Triple M announced in November 2020, after 11 years, that the show would end at the end of the month.

=== The Long Weekend ===
In May 2026, ARN Media and Nine Entertainment announced that McGuire would host a show titled The Long Weekend with Karl Stefanovic from 19 June, the show will be available via streaming platforms including 9Now, Stan, iHeart and will be broadcast on the Gold Network. Separately from hosting with Stefanovic, McGuire will be hosting a new sports podcast exclusively for iHeart. On 17 July 2026, McGuire announced that the show would conclude in its current form.

=== GOLD Sport ===
In July 2026, ARN Media confirmed that McGuire would transition from The Long Weekend into a new twice‑weekly program titled GOLD Sport with Eddie McGuire and Abbey Gelmi, launching on 24 July 2026. The show airs every Monday and Friday at 6pm across the Gold Network and features McGuire’s analysis of major sporting stories, personalities and events.

== CEO of the Nine Network ==
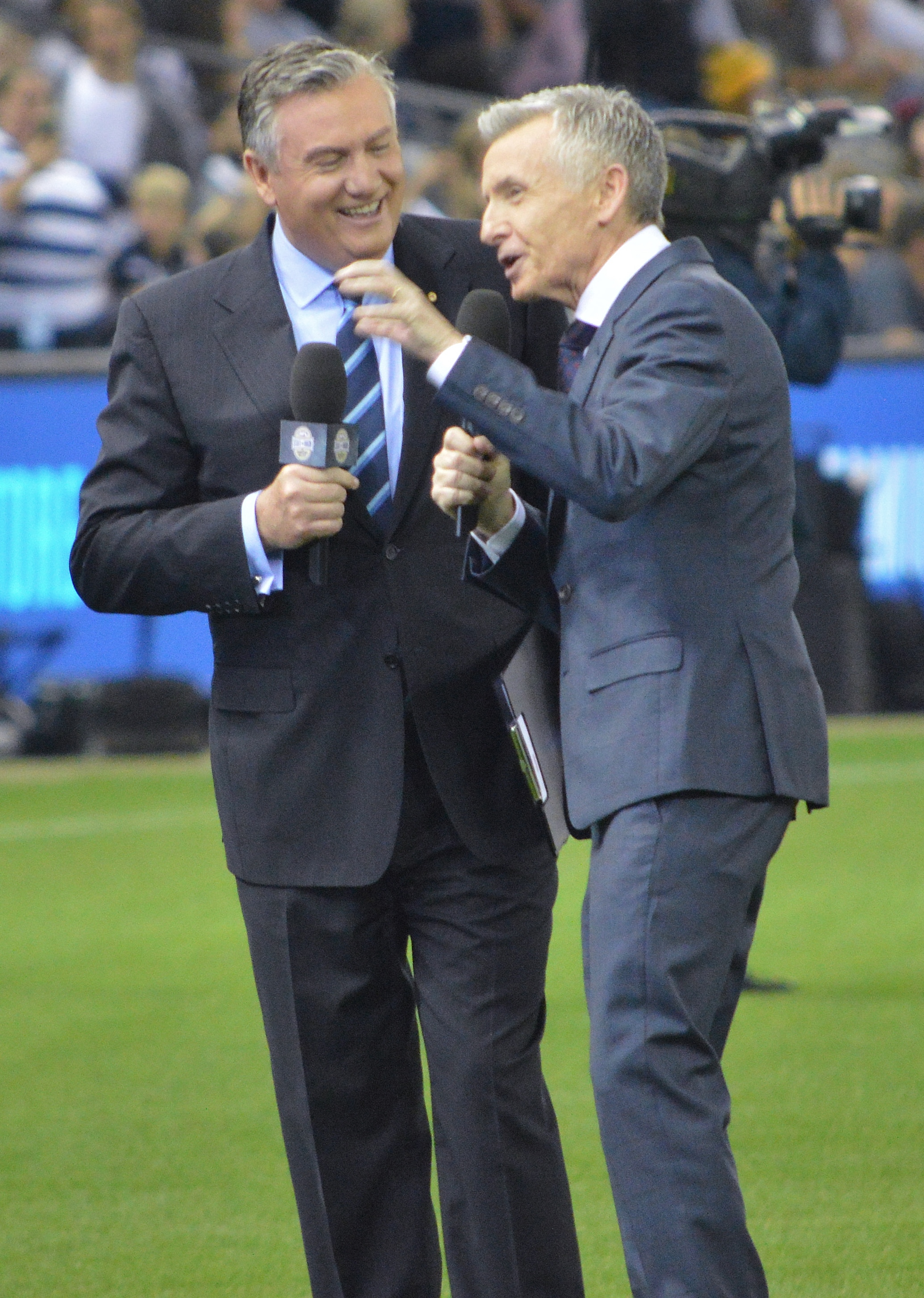
Eddie McGuire and Bruce McAvaney

On 9 February 2006, it was announced that McGuire would become the new CEO of the Nine Network, filling a vacancy created by the departure of David Gyngell in May 2005. McGuire had to sacrifice his on-air commitments including hosting The AFL Footy Show and Who Wants to Be a Millionaire?, as well as AFL commentary, for what turned out to be a very short term tenure. According to Business Review Weekly McGuire's on-air salary was $3.5 million a year. Gyngell had earned $1.1 million a year by comparison. According to the 2006 PBL annual report, McGuire was reported to be on a $4 million fixed remuneration contract. By May 2006, McGuire had travelled to Beaconsfield, Tasmania, to rally Nine News reporters covering the mine collapse. McGuire came out of on-air retirement to host the event, which was broadcast as part of The AFL Footy Show (both versions).

Before leaving for the Munich edition of The Footy Show, he announced the elimination of 100 jobs, most in news and current affairs. Despite a vigorous publicity campaign by the CEO these cost-cutting measures severely damaged morale at the network. On one program, McGuire's required job-cuts exceeded the actual number of employees. This raised questions in both the media and within Channel 9 itself about the competence of Nine's executives.

The troubles worsened when an affidavit written by a Channel 9 executive affected by the purges was leaked to the press and Nine failed in its attempts to suppress it. It contained allegations regarding McGuire's treatment of employees. The document's author, Mark Llewellyn (previous head of news and current affairs who has since found work at Channel 7), claimed that McGuire and his staff had told him that he would be forced to "eat a shit sandwich" (accept a dramatic pay-cut). He also recalled conversations with McGuire where the CEO had spoken of wanting to "bone" (reported to mean "fire") Jessica Rowe, co-host of the network's Today show. Following these allegations McGuire guaranteed Rowe her position on the program. McGuire has never denied the allegations. On 6 May 2007, Llewellyn's position was vindicated when it was announced that Jessica Rowe would not be returning to Channel 9.

McGuire's decision to force Jana Wendt off the Sunday program backfired with the relaunch of the show on 3 September 2006. The Nine Network's switchboard was flooded with an unprecedented number of calls complaining about the new format and hosts. This episode was considered by many in the media as a failure by the 'P-plated CEO' (a term coined by Sydney tabloids) to manage the network in a professional and ethical manner. It also fuelled speculation as to his longevity in his position as CEO of Nine. On 30 June 2007, McGuire resigned as CEO of the Nine Network and took on a new position in programming services as well as more on-screen roles.

== Collingwood Football Club ==
On 29 October 1998, McGuire was elected by the vote of the members as president of the Collingwood Football Club, an Australian rules football club in the Australian Football League (AFL).

In the on-field areas of McGuire's tenure as president of the club, Collingwood played in back-to-back grand-finals (2002–03) within three years of his appointment. In 2010, Collingwood defeated St Kilda in the AFL grand final replay. The first match resulted in a draw, prompting McGuire to say before the replay that "he had seen more drawn Collingwood Grand Finals (1977 and 2010) than he had seen premierships".

In other on-field areas during McGuire's tenure as president, McGuire oversaw the replacements of three senior coaches at Collingwood. The first was the recruitment of Mick Malthouse as senior coach at the end of the 1999 season to replace Tony Shaw, who resigned due to the club receiving the wooden spoon in the 1999 season. In July 2009, McGuire produced a coaching succession plan in which he oversaw a deal that would see the recently retired player Nathan Buckley join the club as an assistant coach under Malthouse for the 2010 and 2011 seasons before Malthouse would hand over the senior coach position to Buckley at the end of the 2011 season. McGuire called it "a humbling experience as a Collingwood person".

In off-field areas during McGuire's tenure as president, he oversaw the redevelopment and construction of Collingwood's new training and administrative facilities, relocated from Victoria Park to the Olympic Park complex with the indoor training and administrative facilities at the Melbourne Sports and Entertainment Centre and the outdoor training ground being firstly moved to the Olympic Park stadium in 2004. In the later years in McGuire's presidency the club moved its outdoor training ground to the newly developed Olympic Park Oval in 2013 which replaced the outdoor space of the previous Olympic Park stadium which had been demolished in 2012.

In December 2020, McGuire announced he would step down as president at the end of the 2021 season, ending a 23-year stint at the helm of the Magpies. However, McGuire stood down earlier than expected in February 2021 due to ongoing pressure after the release of the Do Better report raised allegations of a racist culture at the Collingwood Football Club.

McGuire was replaced by Mark Korda as president.

== Political views ==
In politics, McGuire was a prominent campaigner for Australian republicanism (the movement for replacing the King of Australia as Australia's head of state). He was elected as a delegate to represent Victoria at the 1998 Constitutional Convention, which led to the ultimately unsuccessful 1999 referendum. He is the brother of the Australian Labor politician Frank McGuire. Although being the brother of Frank McGuire, and having ties to Labor party members, ultimately Eddie McGuire stated in 1999 that he would be conflicted representing either the Australian Labor Party or the Liberal Party of Australia. He noted the confounding differences between the economic and social policies of each party and the irreconcilable dissonance in wanting to represent a Liberal Party–styled economy with a Labor Party conscience. In 2002, McGuire stated he would not seek sanctum in politics but that he would not say no to any future thoughts about the matter. McGuire was given the opportunity to represent the seat of Scullin by the Australian Labor Party in 2005; however, his business ventures were prioritised alongside McGuire becoming the then CEO of the Nine Network by 2006.

== Honours ==
In 2001, McGuire was awarded the Australian Sports Medal (2001) "for service to Australian Football".

In 2005, McGuire was appointed a Member of the Order of Australia (AM) (2005) "for service to the community, particularly through support for healthcare and welfare organisations, and to broadcasting".

On 17 May 2013, RMIT University awarded McGuire an honorary doctorate, making him a Doctor of Communications honoris causa. The honour recognises McGuire's achievements in media-, entertainment-, sport- and community-based activities.

McGuire spent a period as a member of the Australian Government's Social Inclusion Board.

== In popular culture ==
McGuire's one-time near-ubiquity in Nine Network programming led to him being nicknamed "Eddie Everywhere". In 2003, the ABC comedy television program CNNNN featured a satirical skit about his permeation of Australian media called the "Eddie McGuire Virus".

On 8 January 2005, McGuire was on Australia's three commercial TV networks (Seven, Nine, Ten) at the same time, with Andrew O'Keefe and Rove McManus, hosting a show simulcast on the networks to raise money for the 2004 Asian tsunami victims. Between 2012 and 2021, due to the contract between Fox Footy and the Seven Network which requires interstate teams to be televised on free-to-air in their respective markets (for example, matches involving the Brisbane Lions must be televised live into Queensland), McGuire could sometimes be heard on Seven calling these matches, though via the Fox Footy feed and never on free-to-air in Melbourne. In February 2020, however, McGuire partnered with Seven commentator Bruce McAvaney on Fox and Seven's co-coverage of the one-off 2020 AFL State of Origin Bushfire Relief match, with the match televised on the Seven Network nationally.

== Controversies ==
=== Bigotry and racism ===
On 24 May 2013, during a match at the MCG, a 13-year-old Collingwood fan racially vilified Sydney Swans player Adam Goodes by referring to him as an "ape", following which McGuire apologised to Goodes "on behalf of the Collingwood Football Club and on behalf of football". McGuire said that Collingwood had a zero-tolerance policy towards racism, but he also said that the girl did not know that what she had said was a racist slur. That same week, on 29 May 2013, McGuire himself made an on-air joke that Adam Goodes should promote the then-soon-to-premiere musical King Kong. He apologised on air after making the reference, but he prefaced his apology by stating: "I wasn't racially vilifying anyone." McGuire's comment was widely criticised. He also held a press conference in which he apologised again. In a later interview that day, he admitted he was guilty of racial vilification. He also offered his resignation as Collingwood president, but the club's board expressed their support for him. Three years later, McGuire claimed he was on "heavy-duty painkillers" during the radio show where he made the King Kong reference.

In June 2015, McGuire was labelled a "continual boofhead" in a motion passed by the Upper house of the Parliament of New South Wales for comments he made about an Indigenous dance performed by Goodes, who was praised as a "role model to all".

In June 2016, McGuire, Sam Newman, North Melbourne president James Brayshaw and former St Kilda player Danny Frawley made jokes about drowning Fairfax journalist Caroline Wilson during the Big Freeze at the 'G event, with McGuire and Newman saying: "We'll put in 10 grand straight away, and if she stays under (the water), 50, even if we have to hold her head under." Frawley later apologised for the comments, but maintained it was a poor attempt at good humour, given the occasion.

On 29 March 2019, McGuire came under more controversy when he mocked double amputee Cynthia Banham for a pre-game coin toss prior to a match between the Sydney Swans and Adelaide. Banham lost both her legs and broke her back in a plane crash in 2007. She appeared to struggle as she tossed the coin before the match while holding her walking stick. McGuire joked that people who could not toss the coin properly should be fined. McGuire apologised and stepped down from calling the Essendon vs St Kilda game for Fox Footy the following day.

=== London Olympics ===
During the 2012 London Olympics, McGuire presented his Triple M radio program from London each weekday. In addition, he called events for the Nine Network and Foxtel and co-hosted the opening and closing ceremonies with Leila McKinnon. McGuire and McKinnon's commentary of the Olympic opening ceremony was widely criticised in newspapers and on Twitter. Errors including spoilers before surprise appearances, ill-timed remarks, reference to the Peter Pan character Captain Hook as Captain Cook, and Abraham Lincoln as a prime minister of the United Kingdom. The McGuire and McKinnon commentary was not used for Foxtel's coverage of the opening ceremony.

=== "Do Better" Report ===
On 1 February 2021, McGuire held a 50-minute press conference to discuss allegations of systemic racism at the Collingwood Football Club after an independent report, called the "Do Better" Report (which Collingwood says it instigated as a matter of self-reflection and to improve race relations), had been leaked. McGuire courted widespread controversy after introducing his speech by saying: "This is an historic and proud day for the Collingwood Football Club."

The opening remark, as well as the general tone of the entire press conference, was widely criticised as spin in order to present Collingwood as being progressive while simultaneously deflecting from the systemic racism for which, as president, McGuire has ultimate responsibility. McGuire was further criticised for not standing down immediately as president, instead insisting that he intended to stay until the end of 2021, saying that he wanted to ensure the changes were implemented correctly; however, this move was challenged even from within Collingwood's own supporter base. Former Magpie player Héritier Lumumba, himself a victim of racial abuse when he played at Collingwood, said the press conference was "bizarre" and "painful to watch". This incident was at least the third widespread call for McGuire's resignation as president during his 22-year period as Collingwood president.

In addition to Lumumba's vocal appeal for McGuire to be stood down, calls for his immediate resignation or dismissal were also made by people such as Adam Bandt, the leader of the Australian Greens and federal MP for Melbourne; a Collingwood-born Victorian Greens senator and the first Victorian Aboriginal senator, Lidia Thorpe; the Herald Sun's lead football writer, Mark Robinson; indigenous former Collingwood player Tony Armstrong; former St Kilda player and anti-racism advocate Nicky Winmar; and Toby Hemingway, a member of the Collingwood fan club who led a supporter call for McGuire's resignation.

Lidia Thorpe said that "The club has a long way to go to restore the community's faith in their leadership. As a start, the board should grow a spine and get Eddie to resign."

After being accused of spinning the press conference into a positive situation for the club, McGuire later remarked that he was sorry "that my error has acted as a distraction from the importance of the findings on racism". On 9 February 2021, after eight days of heavy media scrutiny and the impending release of a damning public letter signed by prominient Indigenous leaders and public figures, McGuire resigned as president of Collingwood Football Club, with immediate effect.

== Publications ==
- McGuire, Eddie and Jim Main. Pants: The Darren Millane Story. Melbourne: Modern Publishing Group, 1994. ISBN 1-875481-53-2
- McGuire, Eddie and Jim Main. The Footy Show screamers: Wit and wisdom of Dermott, Doug, Jason, Rex, Sam, Tim-God, Plugger and more! Melbourne: Wilkinson Books, 1994. ISBN 0-546-65129-1
