= Charlie Roland =

Australian rules footballer (1876–1938)

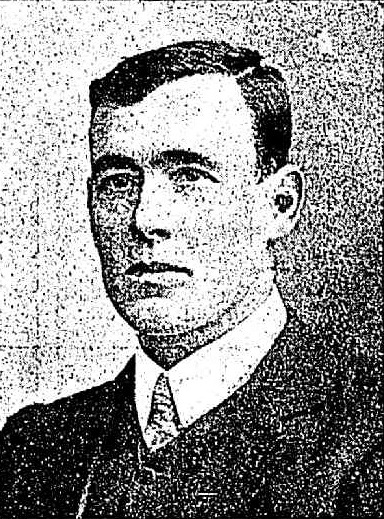
- Roland in 1905

Personal information
- Full name: Charles Henry Roland
- Born: 29 January 1876; Corowa, New South Wales
- Died: 3 February 1938 (aged 62); Balmain, New South Wales
- Original teams: Border United, Excelsior
- Height: 174 cm (5 ft 9 in)
- Weight: 68 kg (150 lb)
- Position: Wing

Playing career^{1}
| Years | Club | Games (Goals) |
| 1900–05, 1908 | Carlton | 100 (24) |
- ^{1} Playing statistics correct to the end of 1908.

Charles Henry Roland (29 January 1876 – 3 February 1938) was an Australian rules footballer who played with Carlton in the Victorian Football League (VFL).

== Family ==
One of the five children of Daniel Roland (1848-1937), and Louisa Roland (1848-1936), née Williams, Charles Henry Roland was born at Corowa, New South Wales on 29 January 1876.

He married Esther Richardson (1875-1944) on 21 October 1911.

== Football ==
Charlie "Tyke" Roland initially played for the Corowa-based Border Federal Junior Football Club in 1893, before transferring to the Border United Football Club in the Ovens and Murray Football League between 1894 and 1898.

Roland then played with the Excelsior Football Club in the Ovens and Murray Football League in 1899, then apparently moved across to Western Australia in early 1900, before playing his first game with the Carlton Football Club in round one, 1900.

In 1902, Roland represented Victoria in a match against South Australia on the Adelaide Oval. South Australia defeated Victoria. He went onto represent Victoria on six occasions.

In 1903, the Carlton Football Club were featured in a team photo in Melbourne Punch, with Roland pictured in the back row.

Roland played for the Kalgoorlie-based Goldfields Football League club Boulder City in 1906 and 1907 and was a member of their 1907 premiership team.

He was later cleared back to Carlton Football Club in May 1908. Roland played four more games for Carlton, bringing his VFL games tally to exactly 100. He missed out on Carlton's premierships in 1906, 1907 and 1908.

Roland finished off the 1908 season with Essendon's Victorian Football Association (VFA) team that lost the preliminary final to Brunswick Football Club.

In 1910, Roland was playing for YMCA – Sydney.

== Death ==
Rowland died in 1938, when he was caught in machinery at a rubber factory in Sydney, where he worked.
