= Frank Hince =

Australian rules footballer

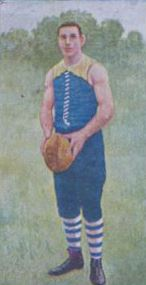
- Cigarette card of Hince during his Carlton career

Personal information
- Full name: Frank Joseph Hince
- Born: 13 January 1882; Carlton, Victoria
- Died: 4 May 1945 (aged 63); Preston, Victoria
- Original team: Fitzroy Crescent

Playing career^{1}
Years	Club	Games (Goals)
1901–1902	Fitzroy	17 (0)
1903–1906	Carlton	36 (1)
Total		43 (1)
- ^{1} Playing statistics correct to the end of 1906.

Frank Joseph Hince (13 January 1882 – 4 May 1945) was an Australian rules footballer who played with Fitzroy and Carlton.
