= Ike Little =

Australian rules footballer

Personal information
- Full name: Isaac Dalton Little
- Born: 19 January 1888; North Melbourne, Victoria
- Died: 14 June 1945 (aged 57); Fitzroy, Victoria
- Original team: North Melbourne (VFA)
- Position: Forward

Playing career^{1}
Years	Club	Games (Goals)
1906	Carlton	8 (5)
- ^{1} Playing statistics correct to the end of 1906.

Ike Little (19 January 1888 – 14 June 1945) was an Australian rules footballer who played for Carlton in the Victorian Football League (VFL).

Little started his career in the VFA where he took the field for North Melbourne. He was used mostly in the forward pocket during his only season at Carlton and kicked a goal in their Grand Final win that year.
