= Kevin Rose (Australian rules footballer) =

Australian rules footballer (born 1939)

Personal information
- Full name: Kevin Thomas Rose
- Born: 4 June 1939 (age 87); Nyah West, Victoria
- Original team: Nyah West
- Height: 184 cm (6 ft 0 in)
- Weight: 86 kg (190 lb)

Playing career^{1}
Years	Club	Games (Goals)
1958–1967	Collingwood	159 (47)
1968–1972	Prahran	55 (33)
Total		214 (80)

Coaching career
Years	Club	Games (W–L–D)
1975–1977	Fitzroy	66 (22–44–0)
- ^{1} Playing statistics correct to the end of 1967.

Kevin Thomas Rose OAM (born 4 June 1939) is a former Australian rules footballer who played for Collingwood in the VFL. He was one of four brothers who played for Collingwood with the most famous being his older brother Bob Rose.

Rose started his career as a half back flanker before becoming a ruck-rover. He was a Collingwood premiership player in 1958 and played in three losing grand final teams. He subsequently played for six years with Prahran on the Victorian Football Association. In 2003 he was selected in Prahran's Team of the Century.

After retiring as a player he took up coaching and was appointed senior coach of Fitzroy in 1975.

From 1996 to 1998 he was president of the Collingwood Football Club before being replaced by Eddie McGuire.

In 2015 Kevin Rose was awarded a Medal of the Order of Australia for "service to the community, and to Australian Rules football."
