= Bert Wregg =

Australian rules footballer and field umpire

Personal information
- Full name: Herbert Sydney Wregg
- Born: 3 May 1879; Richmond, Victoria
- Died: 14 September 1939 (aged 60); Melbourne, Victoria
- Original team: Richmond City/St Albans
- Position: Full-forward

Playing career^{1}
Years	Club	Games (Goals)
1901	Melbourne	3 (3)
- ^{1} Playing statistics correct to the end of 1901.

Herbert Sydney Wregg (3 May 1879 – 14 September 1939) was an Australian rules footballer who played for Melbourne in the Victorian Football League (VFL).

Wregg was a full-forward at Melbourne in the 1901 VFL season but only made three appearances.

In 1904 he returned to the league as a boundary and field umpire. For the Grand Final that year, Wregg officiated as a boundary umpire, the first time the premiership decider had used one. He was then a field umpire in the 1906 VFL Grand Final.
