= Hughie Johns =

Australian rules footballer

Personal information
- Full name: Hugh Augustus Johns
- Born: 27 March 1867; Melbourne
- Died: 28 December 1913 (aged 46); Sorrento, Victoria
- Height: 173 cm (5 ft 8 in)

Playing career^{1}
Years	Club	Games (Goals)
1900	Essendon	1 (2)
- ^{1} Playing statistics correct to the end of 1900.

Hugh Augustus Johns (27 March 1867 – 28 December 1913) was an Australian rules footballer who played with Essendon in the Victorian Football League (VFL).

When Essendon were short of players for their match against Collingwood at Victoria Park in Round 11 of the 1900 VFL season, due to an injury crisis, Johns was one of several people called up at the last minute. Four were players from the reserves, another was club secretary Bill Crebbin and then Johns, described by The Argus as a "supporter of the team", was brought into the side. Johns, aged 33, managed to kick two of Essendon's four goals, in a 21-point loss.

Johns worked at Essendon as a trainer, until his death on 28 December 1913, when he drowned while on holiday in Sorrento, Victoria after suffering cramp.
