= Lou Barker =

Australian rules footballer

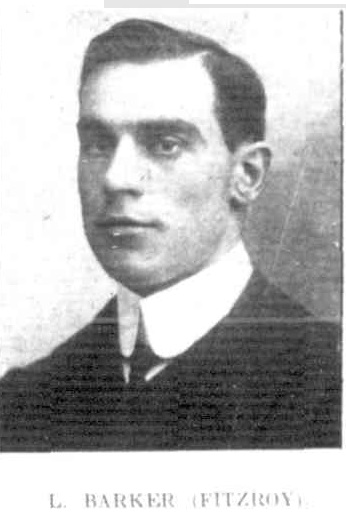
- Barker in 1907

Personal information
- Full name: Louis Barker
- Born: 26 May 1876; Melbourne, Victoria
- Died: 23 May 1963 (aged 86); Kew, Victoria
- Original team: South St Kilda
- Height: 179 cm (5 ft 10 in)
- Weight: 76 kg (168 lb)
- Position: Half forward / Defence

Playing career^{1}
Years	Club	Games (Goals)
1900–08	Fitzroy	150 (63)

Representative team honours
Years	Team	Games (Goals)
1903	Victoria	
- ^{1} Playing statistics correct to the end of 1908.

Career highlights
- VFL premiership player: 1905

Louis Barker (26 May 1876 – 23 May 1963) was an Australian rules footballer who played for the Fitzroy Football Club in the Victorian Football League (VFL).

== Sources ==
- Holmesby, Russell & Main, Jim (2009). The Encyclopedia of AFL Footballers. 8th ed. Melbourne: Bas Publishing.
- Lou Barker's playing statistics from AFL Tables
