= Don Fraser (footballer, born 1882) =

Australian rules footballer

Don(David)Fraser
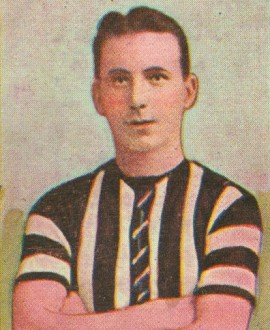
- Fraser in 1906

Personal information
- Full name: Donald/David James Fraser
- Born: 9 September 1882; Terang, Victoria
- Died: 18 July 1963 (aged 80); East Melbourne, Victoria
- Original team: Leopold
- Height: 179 cm (5 ft 10 in)
- Weight: 81 kg (179 lb)

Playing career^{1}
Years	Club	Games (Goals)
1904–06	Collingwood	31 (0)
- ^{1} Playing statistics correct to the end of 1906.

Donald James Fraser (9 September 1882 – 18 July 1963) was an Australian rules footballer who played with Collingwood in the Victorian Football League (VFL).

A decade after his football career Fraser enlisted to serve in World War I, being gassed in France in 1918 and invalided back to England for treatment.
