= Archie Snell =

Australian rules footballer

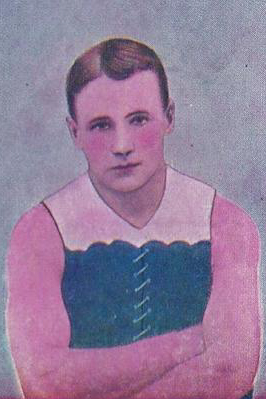
- Cigarette card of Snell in 1905

Personal information
- Full name: Arthur Silvanus Snell
- Born: 30 July 1877; Dromana, Victoria
- Died: 18 July 1949 (aged 71); Box Hill, Victoria
- Original team: West Melbourne

Playing career^{1}
Years	Club	Games (Goals)
1902–1907	Carlton	92 (56)
1908	Essendon	1 (0)
Total		93 (56)
- ^{1} Playing statistics correct to the end of 1907.

Arthur Silvanus "Archie" Snell (30 July 1877 – 18 July 1949) was an Australian rules footballer who played for the Carlton Football Club and Essendon Football Club in the Victorian Football League (VFL).
