= Harry Clarke (Australian footballer, born 1876) =

Australian rules footballer

Personal information
- Full name: John Henry Clarke
- Born: 29 June 1876; Wallaroo, South Australia
- Died: 25 February 1955 (aged 78); Kew, Victoria
- Original team: Windsor

Playing career^{1}
| Years | Club | Games (Goals) |
| 1898–1904 | Fitzroy | 91 (3) |
- ^{1} Playing statistics correct to the end of 1904.

Career highlights
- 3× VFL premiership player: 1898, 1899, 1904

John Henry Clarke (29 June 1876 – 25 February 1955) was an Australian rules footballer who played for the Fitzroy Football Club in the Victorian Football League (VFL).

Clarke, who played finals in each of his seven league seasons, was the centreman in Fitzroy's 1898, 1899 and 1904 premierships teams. He was also a losing grand finalist in 1900 and 1903.
