= 1904 VFL season =

Eighth season of the Victorian Football League (VFL)

1904 VFL premiership season
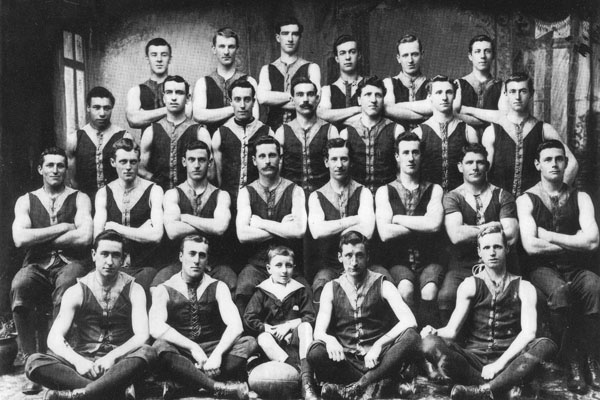
- Fitzroy 1904 VFL premiership team
- Date: 7 May – 17 September 1904
- Teams: 8
- Premiers: Fitzroy; 3rd premiership
- Minor premiers: Fitzroy; 3rd minor premiership
- Leading goalkicker medallist: Vin Coutie (Melbourne); 39 goals
- Matches played: 71

The 1904 VFL season was the eighth season of the Victorian Football League (VFL), the highest-level senior Australian rules football competition in Victoria. The season featured eight clubs and ran from 7 May to 17 September, comprising a 17-round home-and-away season followed by a two-week finals series featuring the top four clubs.

Fitzroy won the premiership, defeating Carlton by 24 points in the 1904 VFL grand final; it was Fitzroy's third VFL premiership. Fitzroy also won the minor premiership by finishing atop the home-and-away ladder with a 12–5 win–loss record. Melbourne's Vin Coutie won the leading goalkicker medal as the league's leading goalkicker.

== Background ==
In 1904, the VFL competition consisted of eight teams of 18 on-the-field players each, with no "reserves", although any of the 18 players who had left the playing field for any reason could later resume their place on the field at any time during the match.

Each team played each other twice in a home-and-away season of 14 rounds. Then, based on ladder positions after those 14 rounds, three further 'sectional rounds' were played, with the teams ranked 1st, 3rd, 5th and 7th playing in one section and the teams ranked 2nd, 4th, 6th and 8th playing in the other.

Once the 17 round home-and-away season had finished, the 1904 VFL Premiers were determined by the specific format and conventions of the amended "Argus system".

== Home-and-away season ==
=== Round 1 ===
Home team	Home team score	Away team	Away team score	Venue	Date
Essendon	8.10 (58)	South Melbourne	2.5 (17)	EMCG	7 May 1904
Collingwood	9.15 (69)	Geelong	7.9 (51)	Victoria Park	7 May 1904
Carlton	1.8 (14)	Fitzroy	16.12 (108)	Princes Park	7 May 1904
St Kilda	12.13 (85)	Melbourne	5.9 (39)	Junction Oval	7 May 1904

=== Round 2 ===
Home team	Home team score	Away team	Away team score	Venue	Date
Fitzroy	11.17 (83)	St Kilda	5.3 (33)	Brunswick Street Oval	14 May 1904
Geelong	10.7 (67)	Essendon	5.13 (43)	Corio Oval	14 May 1904
Melbourne	7.7 (49)	Collingwood	7.13 (55)	MCG	14 May 1904
South Melbourne	1.13 (19)	Carlton	5.6 (36)	Lake Oval	14 May 1904

=== Round 3 ===
Home team	Home team score	Away team	Away team score	Venue	Date
Collingwood	4.5 (29)	South Melbourne	7.13 (55)	Victoria Park	21 May 1904
Carlton	8.17 (65)	Geelong	4.8 (32)	Princes Park	21 May 1904
Melbourne	3.5 (23)	Fitzroy	14.15 (99)	MCG	21 May 1904
St Kilda	5.3 (33)	Essendon	10.9 (69)	Junction Oval	21 May 1904

=== Round 4 ===
Home team	Home team score	Away team	Away team score	Venue	Date
Geelong	6.4 (40)	South Melbourne	6.16 (52)	Corio Oval	28 May 1904
Fitzroy	4.9 (33)	Collingwood	6.6 (42)	Brunswick Street Oval	28 May 1904
St Kilda	4.7 (31)	Carlton	6.4 (40)	Junction Oval	28 May 1904
Melbourne	9.17 (71)	Essendon	6.3 (39)	SCG	28 May 1904

=== Round 5 ===
Home team	Home team score	Away team	Away team score	Venue	Date
Geelong	6.13 (49)	St Kilda	4.10 (34)	Corio Oval	4 June 1904
Essendon	6.5 (41)	Fitzroy	11.17 (83)	EMCG	4 June 1904
South Melbourne	8.16 (64)	Melbourne	5.9 (39)	Lake Oval	4 June 1904
Collingwood	6.12 (48)	Carlton	8.5 (53)	Victoria Park	4 June 1904

=== Round 6 ===
Home team	Home team score	Away team	Away team score	Venue	Date
Fitzroy	12.6 (78)	Geelong	6.18 (54)	Brunswick Street Oval	6 June 1904
South Melbourne	15.10 (100)	St Kilda	9.4 (58)	Lake Oval	6 June 1904
Essendon	6.5 (41)	Collingwood	6.7 (43)	EMCG	6 June 1904
Melbourne	8.10 (58)	Carlton	5.5 (35)	MCG	6 June 1904

=== Round 7 ===
Home team	Home team score	Away team	Away team score	Venue	Date
Geelong	9.12 (66)	Melbourne	15.7 (97)	Corio Oval	11 June 1904
Fitzroy	6.9 (45)	South Melbourne	5.14 (44)	Brunswick Street Oval	11 June 1904
Carlton	7.5 (47)	Essendon	7.11 (53)	Princes Park	11 June 1904
St Kilda	7.7 (49)	Collingwood	4.10 (34)	Junction Oval	11 June 1904

=== Round 8 ===
Home team	Home team score	Away team	Away team score	Venue	Date
Melbourne	13.13 (91)	St Kilda	4.2 (26)	MCG	25 June 1904
South Melbourne	10.9 (69)	Essendon	4.5 (29)	Lake Oval	25 June 1904
Geelong	4.10 (34)	Collingwood	8.10 (58)	Corio Oval	25 June 1904
Fitzroy	8.8 (56)	Carlton	7.10 (52)	Brunswick Street Oval	25 June 1904

=== Round 9 ===
Home team	Home team score	Away team	Away team score	Venue	Date
Essendon	9.12 (66)	Geelong	4.4 (28)	EMCG	2 July 1904
Collingwood	4.5 (29)	Melbourne	8.6 (54)	Victoria Park	2 July 1904
Carlton	9.7 (61)	South Melbourne	5.7 (37)	Princes Park	2 July 1904
St Kilda	11.12 (78)	Fitzroy	4.7 (31)	Junction Oval	2 July 1904

=== Round 10 ===
Home team	Home team score	Away team	Away team score	Venue	Date
Fitzroy	8.10 (58)	Melbourne	5.13 (43)	Brunswick Street Oval	9 July 1904
Essendon	6.8 (44)	St Kilda	6.3 (39)	EMCG	9 July 1904
South Melbourne	5.15 (45)	Collingwood	6.6 (42)	Lake Oval	9 July 1904
Geelong	4.11 (35)	Carlton	5.5 (35)	Corio Oval	9 July 1904

=== Round 11 ===
Home team	Home team score	Away team	Away team score	Venue	Date
Collingwood	7.13 (55)	Fitzroy	3.6 (24)	Victoria Park	16 July 1904
Carlton	9.7 (61)	St Kilda	4.1 (25)	Princes Park	16 July 1904
South Melbourne	6.5 (41)	Geelong	4.15 (39)	Lake Oval	16 July 1904
Melbourne	3.12 (30)	Essendon	4.11 (35)	MCG	16 July 1904

=== Round 12 ===
Home team	Home team score	Away team	Away team score	Venue	Date
Melbourne	9.13 (67)	South Melbourne	11.7 (73)	MCG	23 July 1904
Carlton	6.10 (46)	Collingwood	6.4 (40)	Princes Park	23 July 1904
St Kilda	5.5 (35)	Geelong	7.16 (58)	Junction Oval	23 July 1904
Fitzroy	6.8 (44)	Essendon	3.9 (27)	Brunswick Street Oval	23 July 1904

=== Round 13 ===
Home team	Home team score	Away team	Away team score	Venue	Date
St Kilda	6.10 (46)	South Melbourne	10.5 (65)	Junction Oval	30 July 1904
Collingwood	5.6 (36)	Essendon	7.10 (52)	Victoria Park	30 July 1904
Carlton	6.14 (50)	Melbourne	4.10 (34)	Princes Park	30 July 1904
Geelong	5.12 (42)	Fitzroy	4.13 (37)	Corio Oval	30 July 1904

=== Round 14 ===
Home team	Home team score	Away team	Away team score	Venue	Date
Collingwood	14.12 (96)	St Kilda	6.10 (46)	Victoria Park	13 August 1904
Melbourne	11.10 (76)	Geelong	6.4 (40)	MCG	13 August 1904
South Melbourne	5.16 (46)	Fitzroy	8.10 (58)	Lake Oval	13 August 1904
Essendon	5.5 (35)	Carlton	5.9 (39)	EMCG	13 August 1904

=== Pre-sectional ladder ===
Section A
Section B

#	Team	P	W	L	D	PF	PA	%	Pts
1	Fitzroy	14	10	4	0	837	594	140.9	40
2	Carlton	14	9	4	1	634	611	103.8	38
3	South Melbourne	14	9	5	0	727	647	112.4	36
4	Collingwood	14	7	7	0	676	632	107.0	28
5	Essendon	14	7	7	0	632	646	97.8	28
6	Melbourne	14	6	8	0	771	754	102.3	24
7	Geelong	14	4	9	1	635	786	80.8	18
8	St Kilda	14	3	11	0	618	860	71.9	12

Rules for classification: 1. premiership points; 2. percentage; 3. points for
Source: AFL Tables

=== Round 15 (Sectional round 1) ===
Home team	Home team score	Away team	Away team score	Venue	Date
Collingwood	14.12 (96)	Carlton	6.10 (46)	Victoria Park	20 August 1904
Essendon	8.9 (57)	Geelong	5.9 (39)	EMCG	20 August 1904
Fitzroy	4.14 (38)	South Melbourne	3.15 (33)	Brunswick Street Oval	20 August 1904
Melbourne	13.15 (93)	St Kilda	3.3 (21)	MCG	20 August 1904

=== Round 16 (Sectional round 2) ===
Home team	Home team score	Away team	Away team score	Venue	Date
Carlton	1.8 (14)	Melbourne	5.13 (43)	Princes Park	27 August 1904
St Kilda	2.8 (20)	Collingwood	12.9 (81)	Junction Oval	27 August 1904
South Melbourne	4.3 (27)	Essendon	8.11 (59)	Lake Oval	27 August 1904
Geelong	4.6 (30)	Fitzroy	8.5 (53)	Corio Oval	27 August 1904

=== Round 17 (Sectional round 3) ===
Home team	Home team score	Away team	Away team score	Venue	Date
Carlton	16.11 (107)	St Kilda	7.7 (49)	Princes Park	3 September 1904
Melbourne	5.10 (40)	Collingwood	7.9 (51)	MCG	3 September 1904
Essendon	13.9 (87)	Fitzroy	4.2 (26)	EMCG	3 September 1904
Geelong	3.4 (22)	South Melbourne	6.8 (44)	Corio Oval	3 September 1904

== Ladder ==
(P)	Premiers
	Qualified for finals

#	Team	P	W	L	D	PF	PA	%	Pts
1	Fitzroy (P)	17	12	5	0	954	744	128.2	48
2	Carlton	17	10	6	1	804	762	105.5	42
3	Collingwood	17	10	7	0	867	741	117.0	40
4	Essendon	17	10	7	0	835	738	113.1	40
5	South Melbourne	17	10	7	0	831	766	108.5	40
6	Melbourne	17	8	9	0	947	840	112.7	32
7	Geelong	17	4	12	1	726	940	77.2	18
8	St Kilda	17	3	14	0	708	1141	62.1	12

Rules for classification: 1. premiership points; 2. percentage; 3. points for
Average score: 49.1
Source: AFL Tables

== Finals series ==
=== Semi-finals ===
Home team	Home team score	Away team	Away team score	Venue	Date	Attendance
Carlton	6.7 (43)	Essendon	6.4 (40)	Victoria Park	10 September 1904	16,000
Fitzroy	9.7 (61)	Collingwood	7.8 (50)	MCG	10 September 1904	25,000

=== Grand final ===
	Grand final
Saturday, 17 September (2:50 pm)	Fitzroy 9.7 (61)	def.	Carlton 5.7 (37)	Melbourne Cricket Ground (crowd: 32,688)

== Season notes ==
- The final home-and-away match between South Melbourne and Fitzroy at the Lake Oval was a torrid affair. Billy McGee of South Melbourne and Harry Clarke of Fitzroy were each suspended for three matches, while South Melbourne's Billy Gent ran amok during the match, charging at players and was reported on three striking charges; Gent was suspended for the remainder of 1904 and all of 1905 (20 matches).
- After the drawn match between Geelong and Carlton at Corio Oval on 9 July 1904, a spectator was arrested for attacking the field umpire, Henry "Ivo" Crapp.
- Essendon veteran George Hastings made an ill-fated comeback against Fitzroy in Round 5, using the pseudonym of former teammate Hughie Johns. He was injured before half-time, thus ending his career after 107 games.
- The VFL introduced boundary umpires.
- In round four, Essendon played Melbourne in Sydney in front of only 6,000 spectators at the Sydney Cricket Ground, lost to Melbourne, took five days to return to Melbourne by sea, then lost again to Fitzroy in their Saturday's round five match.
- In the Final Premiership match Carlton was surging ahead of Fitzroy, and one of the Carlton forwards (Ross, 1996, does not name him, but it was most likely Mick Grace) took a powerful high overhead mark with his knees in his opponent's back. The field umpire, Henry "Ivo" Crapp, obeying the VFL rules of the day, paid a free kick to the Fitzroy player for "interference". Fitzroy steadied and went on to win the game. There was such an outcry after the match that the VFL immediately amended its rules to allow for what it now termed "unintentional interference".

== Awards ==
- The 1904 VFL Premiership team was Fitzroy.
- The VFL's leading goalkicker was Vince Coutie of Melbourne with 39 goals.
- St Kilda took the "wooden spoon" in 1904.

== Sources ==
- 1904 VFL season at AFL Tables
- 1904 VFL season at Australian Football
