= 1905 VFL season =

Ninth season of the Victorian Football League (VFL)

1905 VFL premiership season
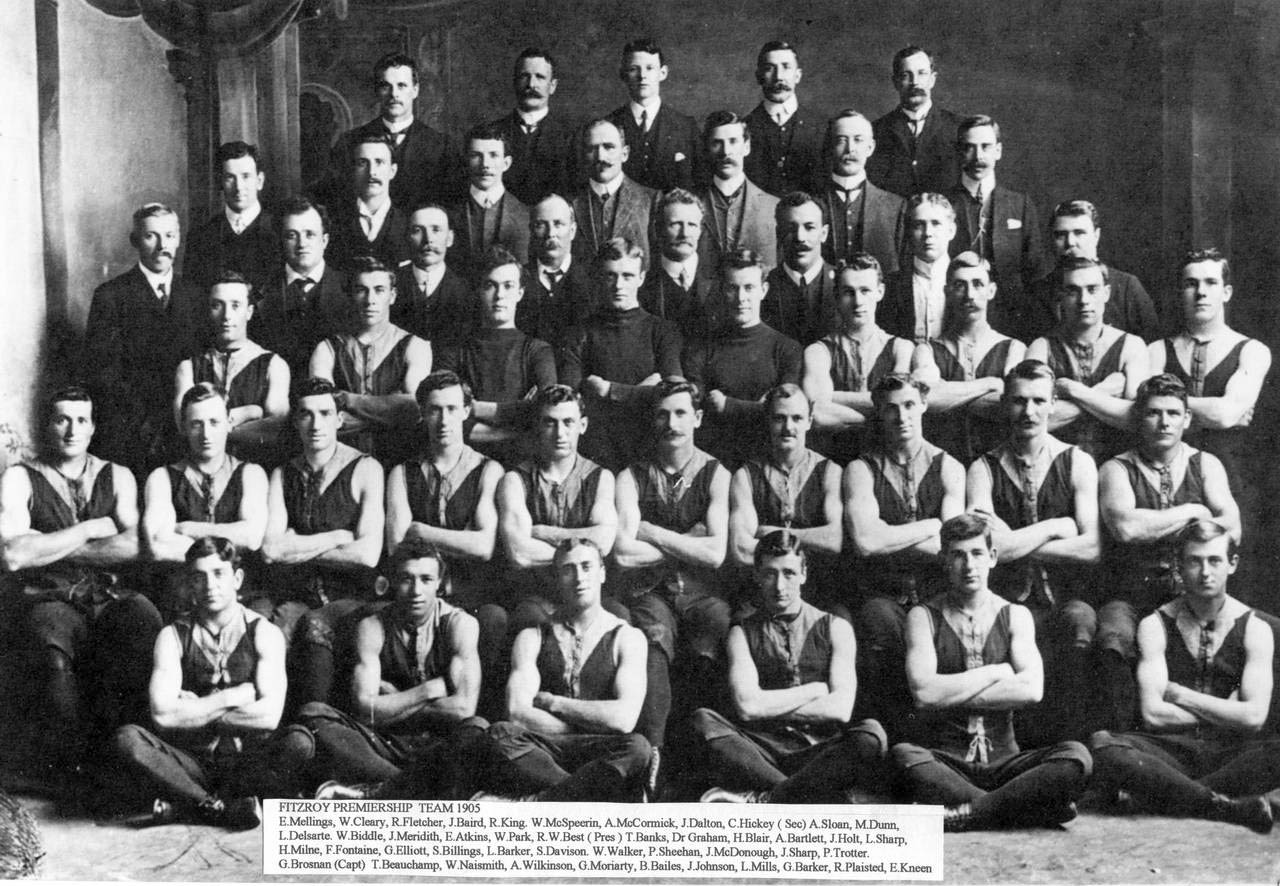
- Fitzroy 1905 VFL premiership team
- Date: 6 May – 30 September 1905
- Teams: 8
- Premiers: Fitzroy; 4th premiership
- Minor premiers: Collingwood; 3rd minor premiership
- Leading goalkicker medallist: Charlie Pannam (Collingwood); 38 goals
- Matches played: 72

The 1905 VFL season was the ninth season of the Victorian Football League (VFL), the highest-level senior Australian rules football competition in Victoria. The season featured eight clubs and ran from 6 May to 30 September, comprising a 17-match home-and-away season followed by a three-week finals series featuring the top four clubs.

Fitzroy won the premiership, defeating Collingwood by 13 points in the 1905 VFL grand final; it was Fitzroy's second consecutive premiership and fourth VFL premiership overall. Collingwood won the minor premiership by finishing atop the home-and-away ladder with a 15–2 win–loss record. Collingwood's Charlie Pannam won the leading goalkicker medal as the league's leading goalkicker.

== Background ==
In 1905, the VFL competition consisted of eight teams of 18 on-the-field players each, with no "reserves", although any of the 18 players who had left the playing field for any reason could later resume their place on the field at any time during the match.

Each team played each other twice in a home-and-away season of 14 rounds. Then, based on ladder positions after those 14 rounds, three further 'sectional rounds' were played, with the teams ranked 1st, 3rd, 5th and 7th playing in one section and the teams ranked 2nd, 4th, 6th and 8th playing in the other.

Once the 14 round home-and-away season had finished, the 1905 VFL Premiers were determined by the specific format and conventions of the amended "Argus system".

== Home-and-away season ==
=== Round 1 ===
Home team	Home team score	Away team	Away team score	Venue	Date
Melbourne	9.8 (62)	St Kilda	6.10 (46)	MCG	6 May 1905
Geelong	5.9 (39)	South Melbourne	8.14 (62)	Corio Oval	6 May 1905
Carlton	8.12 (60)	Essendon	7.10 (52)	Princes Park	6 May 1905
Fitzroy	4.10 (34)	Collingwood	3.13 (31)	Brunswick Street Oval	6 May 1905

=== Round 2 ===
Home team	Home team score	Away team	Away team score	Venue	Date
Essendon	12.10 (82)	Geelong	7.6 (48)	EMCG	13 May 1905
South Melbourne	11.7 (73)	Melbourne	10.7 (67)	Lake Oval	13 May 1905
St Kilda	4.9 (33)	Fitzroy	9.10 (64)	Junction Oval	13 May 1905
Collingwood	10.10 (70)	Carlton	4.14 (38)	Victoria Park	13 May 1905

=== Round 3 ===
Home team	Home team score	Away team	Away team score	Venue	Date
Fitzroy	10.16 (76)	Geelong	4.11 (35)	Brunswick Street Oval	20 May 1905
Melbourne	8.14 (62)	Essendon	5.9 (39)	MCG	20 May 1905
St Kilda	10.10 (70)	Collingwood	18.10 (118)	Junction Oval	20 May 1905
South Melbourne	5.15 (45)	Carlton	7.13 (55)	Lake Oval	20 May 1905

=== Round 4 ===
Home team	Home team score	Away team	Away team score	Venue	Date
Geelong	5.13 (43)	St Kilda	7.4 (46)	Corio Oval	27 May 1905
Essendon	14.11 (95)	South Melbourne	5.9 (39)	EMCG	27 May 1905
Collingwood	5.16 (46)	Melbourne	4.7 (31)	Victoria Park	27 May 1905
Carlton	5.7 (37)	Fitzroy	10.13 (73)	Princes Park	27 May 1905

=== Round 5 ===
Home team	Home team score	Away team	Away team score	Venue	Date
Collingwood	12.9 (81)	South Melbourne	2.10 (22)	Victoria Park	3 June 1905
Melbourne	3.12 (30)	Fitzroy	5.8 (38)	MCG	3 June 1905
Carlton	5.10 (40)	Geelong	4.4 (28)	Princes Park	5 June 1905
St Kilda	5.9 (39)	Essendon	7.12 (54)	Junction Oval	5 June 1905

=== Round 6 ===
Home team	Home team score	Away team	Away team score	Venue	Date
South Melbourne	6.11 (47)	St Kilda	3.6 (24)	Lake Oval	10 June 1905
Fitzroy	5.5 (35)	Essendon	3.10 (28)	Brunswick Street Oval	10 June 1905
Geelong	4.3 (27)	Collingwood	6.10 (46)	Corio Oval	10 June 1905
Melbourne	5.8 (38)	Carlton	6.5 (41)	MCG	10 June 1905

=== Round 7 ===
Home team	Home team score	Away team	Away team score	Venue	Date
Geelong	7.14 (56)	Melbourne	7.12 (54)	Corio Oval	17 June 1905
Fitzroy	9.14 (68)	South Melbourne	6.6 (42)	Brunswick Street Oval	17 June 1905
Essendon	6.7 (43)	Collingwood	10.12 (72)	EMCG	17 June 1905
St Kilda	3.7 (25)	Carlton	8.15 (63)	Junction Oval	17 June 1905

=== Round 8 ===
Home team	Home team score	Away team	Away team score	Venue	Date
Collingwood	5.11 (41)	Fitzroy	3.1 (19)	Victoria Park	1 July 1905
St Kilda	8.6 (54)	Melbourne	7.9 (51)	Junction Oval	1 July 1905
South Melbourne	4.5 (29)	Geelong	6.7 (43)	Lake Oval	1 July 1905
Essendon	7.20 (62)	Carlton	8.12 (60)	EMCG	1 July 1905

=== Round 9 ===
Home team	Home team score	Away team	Away team score	Venue	Date
Melbourne	3.8 (26)	South Melbourne	8.10 (58)	MCG	8 July 1905
Fitzroy	14.7 (91)	St Kilda	6.4 (40)	Brunswick Street Oval	8 July 1905
Carlton	6.8 (44)	Collingwood	8.11 (59)	Princes Park	8 July 1905
Geelong	9.8 (62)	Essendon	6.12 (48)	Corio Oval	8 July 1905

=== Round 10 ===
Home team	Home team score	Away team	Away team score	Venue	Date
Essendon	8.17 (65)	Melbourne	5.11 (41)	EMCG	15 July 1905
Collingwood	13.19 (97)	St Kilda	3.9 (27)	Victoria Park	15 July 1905
Carlton	7.16 (58)	South Melbourne	8.13 (61)	Princes Park	15 July 1905
Geelong	9.8 (62)	Fitzroy	2.15 (27)	Corio Oval	15 July 1905

=== Round 11 ===
Home team	Home team score	Away team	Away team score	Venue	Date
St Kilda	3.5 (23)	Geelong	6.12 (48)	Junction Oval	22 July 1905
South Melbourne	7.8 (50)	Essendon	6.13 (49)	Lake Oval	22 July 1905
Melbourne	6.5 (41)	Collingwood	9.20 (74)	MCG	22 July 1905
Fitzroy	5.9 (39)	Carlton	6.5 (41)	Brunswick Street Oval	22 July 1905

=== Round 12 ===
Home team	Home team score	Away team	Away team score	Venue	Date
Fitzroy	5.7 (37)	Melbourne	2.6 (18)	Brunswick Street Oval	29 July 1905
Essendon	9.16 (70)	St Kilda	3.9 (27)	EMCG	29 July 1905
South Melbourne	3.3 (21)	Collingwood	4.5 (29)	Lake Oval	29 July 1905
Geelong	6.5 (41)	Carlton	6.11 (47)	Corio Oval	29 July 1905

=== Round 13 ===
Home team	Home team score	Away team	Away team score	Venue	Date
St Kilda	5.11 (41)	South Melbourne	5.9 (39)	Junction Oval	5 August 1905
Essendon	3.11 (29)	Fitzroy	5.12 (42)	EMCG	5 August 1905
Collingwood	7.8 (50)	Geelong	4.12 (36)	Victoria Park	5 August 1905
Carlton	12.10 (82)	Melbourne	2.8 (20)	Princes Park	5 August 1905

=== Round 14 ===
Home team	Home team score	Away team	Away team score	Venue	Date
Collingwood	7.11 (53)	Essendon	10.6 (66)	Victoria Park	19 August 1905
Carlton	9.19 (73)	St Kilda	3.5 (23)	Princes Park	19 August 1905
Melbourne	13.12 (90)	Geelong	7.13 (55)	MCG	19 August 1905
South Melbourne	7.8 (50)	Fitzroy	7.8 (50)	Lake Oval	19 August 1905

=== Pre-sectional ladder ===
Section A
Section B

#	Team	P	W	L	D	PF	PA	%	Pts
1	Collingwood	14	12	2	0	867	519	167.1	48
2	Fitzroy	14	10	3	1	693	517	134.0	42
3	Carlton	14	9	5	0	739	636	116.2	36
4	Essendon	14	7	7	0	782	690	113.3	28
5	South Melbourne	14	6	7	1	638	725	88.0	26
6	Geelong	14	5	9	0	623	720	86.5	20
7	Melbourne	14	3	11	0	631	764	82.6	12
8	St Kilda	14	3	11	0	518	920	56.3	12

Rules for classification: 1. premiership points; 2. percentage; 3. points for
Source: AFL Tables

=== Round 15 (Sectional round 1) ===
Home team	Home team score	Away team	Away team score	Venue	Date
Collingwood	9.12 (66)	Carlton	6.13 (49)	Victoria Park	26 August 1905
Essendon	10.13 (73)	Geelong	3.11 (29)	EMCG	26 August 1905
Fitzroy	6.9 (45)	St Kilda	4.7 (31)	Brunswick Street Oval	26 August 1905
South Melbourne	13.11 (89)	Melbourne	5.10 (40)	Lake Oval	26 August 1905

=== Round 16 (Sectional round 2) ===
Home team	Home team score	Away team	Away team score	Venue	Date
Carlton	12.20 (92)	South Melbourne	7.7 (49)	Princes Park	2 September 1905
Melbourne	3.9 (27)	Collingwood	7.18 (60)	MCG	2 September 1905
St Kilda	8.6 (54)	Essendon	12.12 (84)	Junction Oval	2 September 1905
Geelong	10.8 (68)	Fitzroy	9.12 (66)	Corio Oval	2 September 1905

=== Round 17 (Sectional round 3) ===
Home team	Home team score	Away team	Away team score	Venue	Date
Melbourne	5.8 (38)	Carlton	18.17 (125)	MCG	9 September 1905
Collingwood	17.16 (118)	South Melbourne	5.10 (40)	Victoria Park	9 September 1905
Essendon	4.13 (37)	Fitzroy	11.14 (80)	EMCG	9 September 1905
St Kilda	12.15 (87)	Geelong	3.9 (27)	Junction Oval	9 September 1905

== Ladder ==
(P)	Premiers
	Qualified for finals

#	Team	P	W	L	D	PF	PA	%	Pts
1	Collingwood	17	15	2	0	1111	635	175.0	60
2	Fitzroy (P)	17	12	4	1	884	653	135.4	50
3	Carlton	17	11	6	0	1005	789	127.4	44
4	Essendon	17	9	8	0	976	853	114.4	36
5	South Melbourne	17	7	9	1	816	975	83.7	30
6	Geelong	17	6	11	0	747	946	79.0	24
7	St Kilda	17	4	13	0	690	1076	64.1	16
8	Melbourne	17	3	14	0	736	1038	70.9	12

Rules for classification: 1. premiership points; 2. percentage; 3. points for
Average score: 51.2
Source: AFL Tables

== Finals series ==
=== Semi-finals ===
Home team	Home team score	Away team	Away team score	Venue	Date	Attendance
Fitzroy	12.7 (79)	Essendon	4.12 (36)	Princes Park	16 September 1905	14,000
Collingwood	4.6 (30)	Carlton	11.10 (76)	MCG	16 September 1905	14,000

=== Preliminary final ===
Home team	Home team score	Away team	Away team score	Venue	Date	Attendance
Fitzroy	11.6 (72)	Carlton	6.9 (45)	MCG	23 September 1905	30,000

=== Grand final ===
Team	1 Qtr	2 Qtr	3 Qtr	Final
Collingwood	0.1	1.3	2.4	2.5 (17)
Fitzroy	0.3	1.3	4.6	4.6 (30)

== Season notes ==
- Collingwood used only 24 players to play its nineteen games – the smallest number of players to represent one club in a VFL/AFL season.
- The Australasian Football Council was formed.
- VFL decides to pay field umpires 30 shillings per match, and boundary umpires seven shillings per match (approx $75.00 and $20.00 in 2008 buying power).

== Awards ==
- The 1905 VFL Premiership team was Fitzroy.
- The VFL's leading goalkicker was Charlie Pannam of Collingwood with 38 goals.
- Melbourne took the "wooden spoon" in 1905.

== Sources ==
- 1905 VFL season at AFL Tables
- 1905 VFL season at Australian Football
