= AFL Tribunal =

Disciplinary tribunal of the Australian Football League

- Jurisdiction: Australian Football League
- Composition method: Tribunal
- Appeals to: Appeals Board
- Website: afl.com.au/news/tribunal

The AFL Tribunal is the disciplinary tribunal of the Australian Football League (AFL), an Australian rules football competition. The Tribunal regulates the conduct of players, umpires, and other officials associated with the AFL and its clubs.

== Points system ==
Prior to 2005, any player who was reported would face a hearing at the AFL Tribunal. This process had become problematic, and in 2005, a new system (similar to that used by the NRL Judiciary at the time) was adopted. The changes were primarily made to reduce the number of tribunal hearings, and to improve the consistency of penalties.

The current tribunal process is as follows:

=== Match Review Panel ===
On-field umpires and certain off-field observers can report players for incidents which occur during games. On the Monday after the round of football, each incident is then reviewed by the Match Review Panel, a small panel of former players and umpires. Within the review, the Match Review Panel grades the severity of the incident in three factors, and awards activation points depending upon the severity. The three factors are:

Conduct
Manner of action	Points
Intentional	3
Reckless	2
Negligent	1
Accidental or Incidental	Charge Rejected

Impact
Degree of impact	Points
Severe	4
High	3
Medium	2
Low	1
Negligible	Charge Rejected

Contact
Point of impact	Points
Head or Groin	2
Elsewhere on Body	1

The activation points from all three categories are added together to give the total activation points for the incident. An incident involving accidental/incidental conduct, or negligible impact, will be rejected and the player will receive no penalty, even if the activation points in the other categories are high. Because of this, any offence must rate at least three activation points to be considered further.

Next, activation points are converted into an offence level:

Activation Points	3–4	5	6	7	8	9
Offence Level	1	2	3	4	5	Ungraded

Next, the player is given a number of base demerit points, based on the type and level of his offence. The base demerit point totals are standardised in the Table of Offences. As an example, any player charged by the Match Review Panel with a Level 4 Kicking offence receives 550 base demerit points. This is where the Match Review Panel's role in the Tribunal process ends.

=== Player response ===
Following the Match Review Panel's findings, a player's base points are subjected to a series of additions and deductions (which are described in the next section) to arrive at a number of total demerit points. Each 100 total demerit points that a player finishes with then corresponds to a suspension for one match; e.g. a player who finished with 225 demerit points will receive a two-match suspension. If a player finishes with fewer than 100 demerit points, they are not suspended, but receives what is known as a reprimand.

Because the penalty is standardised and pre-announced by the Match Review Panel, the player has the option to plead guilty to the charge and receive his penalty without the need to attend a Tribunal hearing; they receive a deduction for doing this (see next section). Alternatively, a player may choose to appeal the findings of the Match Review Panel, and attend a Tribunal hearing to argue the case. Players may appeal to try to have their entire charge withdrawn, or may argue for a reduction in one of the three factors; e.g. a player could try to have the conduct factor reduced from reckless to negligent. Should a player reduce the severity of their infraction, the penalty is re-evaluated and the player is again given the choice to plead guilty or further contest the revised charge.

If an incident is ungraded (i.e. has nine activation points), the player is required to attend a tribunal hearing.

=== Residuals, additions and deductions ===
Residuals (also called carry-over points) are any points a player may still have below the 100 required for a suspension. For every 100 points accrued, the player is suspended one week and the 100 points are subtracted; e.g., a player with 225 demerit points is suspended for two weeks; 200 points are correspondingly subtracted, and the remaining 25 are residual points; or, if a player receives a reprimand with 93.75 points, all of these points are residual as they are not enough to draw a suspension. Residual points from a previous offence will be added to the base demerit points of the player's next offence if it occurs within one year; a player's residual points are cancelled if a year elapses without a punishable offence.

A player with prior suspensions over the past two years is subject to an additional penalty known as loading. For each week in excess of two that a player has been suspended over the past two years, he receives an additional penalty of 10% of the current offence's original base score, up to a maximum penalty of 50%; e.g. a player suspended for three matches will receive a 10% loading, while one suspended for seven matches will receive a 50% loading. (Prior to 2013, the relevant period was three years, and loading began with the first match suspended.)

Any player with more than six years (increased in 2013, previously five years) experience who has not been found guilty of a punishable offence over the previous five years receives a 25% deduction. Finally, players will receive a 25% deduction by accepting the Match Review Panel's finding without contest; this is typically known as an early guilty plea. As a result of this rule, players are often faced with the option of accepting a shorter suspension with an early plea, or contesting the charge and risking a longer suspension if unsuccessful. Note that if a player contests the match review panel's assessment at the Tribunal, and has the number of base demerit points changed, the penalty is re-evaluated, meaning the player, in spite of attending a hearing, can still take an early guilty plea on the revised charge.

The final offence score is thus calculated from this series of discrete steps:

- Residual (from prior offence(s))
- Base Score (from Match Review Panel); this is doubled for a Grand Final offence
- Loading (for poor record)
- Good Record Deduction
- Early Guilty Plea Deduction

Each addition or deduction is made to the final result of the previous calculation step.

==== Grand Final penalties ====
Any reportable offence that occurs during a Grand Final match will receive a double penalty: the offence's original base score as determined by the Match Review Panel is doubled after the additions and deductions previously mentioned. This loading is meant to discourage excessively rough or violent play, as any penalties given as a result would not apply until the following season.

This was instituted as a result of fighting in the 2004 AFL Grand Final between Alastair Lynch and Darryl Wakelin, and several brawls during the match, which resulted in the Tribunal handing down stiff penalties – Lynch was suspended for ten matches and fined $15,000 – and adding the double penalty rule.

=== Offences attracting financial penalties ===
The Match Review Panel also assesses a variety of offences for which players are fined but not suspended, including wrestling, negligent contact with an umpire, making an obscene gesture, etc. As for physical offences, there is a standardised table of penalties, which depend upon the nature of the offence, and any prior similar offences; e.g. a player's second wrestling offence attracts double the penalty of his first. As for physical offences, a player can accept his penalty with an early guilty plea, receiving a 25% reduction in his fine, or he may contest it and risk the full penalty.

=== Appeals Board ===
If a player or the AFL wishes to appeal against a decision handed down in a tribunal hearing, it may take the case to the AFL Appeals Board. The board will re-hear the case, with a different set of panel members, and may uphold or change the Tribunal's original decision. The Appeals Board was established in 1998 following a recommendation from Justice John Hedigan of the Supreme Court of Victoria, after several tribunal findings were appealed through the Victorian court system during the mid-1990s.

=== Deregistration ===
Under the official AFL Deregistration Policy first implemented in May 2011, any player who accumulates a total of at least 10 weeks of suspensions over the course of their football career (both inside and outside the AFL) receives a formal notice that further suspensions can result in their automatic deregistration from the league.

Any player who accumulates a total of 16 weeks or more of suspensions over the course of their career will be automatically deregistered and barred from any further participation. Any previous suspensions within the AFL are carried over at 75% of their original length (e.g. a previous suspension of four weeks will only count as three weeks under this policy), but any immediate suspension is to be considered at its full length. If any player receives an immediate first suspension of 16 weeks or more, deregistration is left at the discretion of the league.

A deregistered player may apply for an exemption to re-register or appeal the deregistration under the appropriate laws of the league after 12 months. However, only one request can be made. Should a player be exempted and re-registered, any further suspension will result in permanent, irrevocable deregistration.

Deregistration is only practiced in country and suburban football competitions; it is not practiced by the AFL as of 2022, since the deregistration policy was designed for serial aggressive offenders, not low-level repeat offenders: in the event, there has not been a serial aggressive offender issue at AFL level since the mid-1990s.

== Administration ==
The AFL Tribunal administration consists of the tribunal itself, an appeals board, and a match review panel.

=== AFL Tribunal ===
- Chairs: Jeffrey Gleeson KC, Renee Enbom KC
- Panel members: Michelle Dench, Wayne Henwood, Jason Johnson, Stephen Jurica, Richard Loveridge, Stewart Loewe, Shannon McFerran, David Neitz, Paul Williams, Shane Wakelin, Talia Radan, Darren Gaspar, Jordan Bannister, Scott Stevens
- Counsel: Nick Pane KC, Andrew Woods, Sally Flynn KC, Lisa Hannon KC, Sam Bird
- Secretary: Matthew Whitaker

=== AFL Appeal Board ===
- Chairs: Murray Kellam KC, John Middleton
- Panel members: Wayne Henwood, Stephen Jurica, Richard Loveridge

=== AFL Match Review Panel ===
- Officer: Michael Christian
- Secretary: Hamish Anderson

== History ==
Since the overhaul, the heaviest suspension for a single offence has been eight weeks, handed out to Fremantle's Dean Solomon for elbowing Geelong's Cameron Ling in round 15 of the 2008 season, and to West Coast's Andrew Gaff for striking Fremantle's Andrew Brayshaw in round 20 of the 2018 season.

In 2007, Steven Baker of St Kilda was suspended for seven matches for rough conduct on Jeff Farmer (although the base suspension was only four weeks, with residual points and a significant loading due to his poor record his penalty increased to seven).

In Round 4, 2008, Barry Hall of the Sydney Swans was suspended for seven matches after striking West Coast's Brent Staker.

The longest suspension was handed out in June 2010; Steven Baker of St Kilda was suspended for a total of nine weeks after he pleaded guilty to three striking charges and was found guilty of a misconduct charge, all against Geelong's Steve Johnson. He was the first person to be charged with misconduct for interfering with an injured opponent.

In May 2014, Melbourne midfielder Jack Viney was sent straight to the tribunal following a bump which resulted in Adelaide forward Tom Lynch breaking his jaw. Viney was found guilty of rough conduct by the tribunal, and suspended for two matches, after it was ruled that he had options other than to bump Lynch. Melbourne subsequently appealed the suspension, which was overturned, making it just the second time since 2005 that an appeal against the AFL Tribunal's ruling was overruled.

In June 2017, the AFL challenged the tribunal's verdict for the first time in history, following an off-the-ball incident involving Richmond player Bachar Houli and Carlton's Jed Lamb: Houli was originally given a two-week suspension for striking Lamb during the first quarter of the Round 14 match at the Melbourne Cricket Ground. Houli was reported for the incident, which saw Lamb sit out the remainder of the match, and sent straight to the tribunal the following day. When his case went before the tribunal that week, he was given the two-week suspension, but part of the reason the penalty was low was due to character reference statements given by Prime Minister Malcolm Turnbull and media personality Waleed Aly. Following an announcement of the penalty, there was a public outcry about the length of the suspension. The following day the AFL announced they would challenge the decision, and the matter would be heard in front of the appeals tribunal. Following an extensive review hearing, Houli's suspension was doubled from two weeks to four weeks.

In June 2018, Greater Western Sydney player Jeremy Cameron became the first player in AFL history to be referred directly to the tribunal more than once in his career, where he was found guilty of striking Brisbane Lions player Harris Andrews and suspended for five matches. He had previously been sent straight to the tribunal after breaking Rhys Mathieson's jaw during a pre-season match in 2016, for which he was suspended for four matches.

In February 2019, Greater Western Sydney player Nicola Barr became the first player in AFL Women's history to be referred directly to the AFLW Tribunal, where she was found guilty of rough conduct against North Melbourne's Ashleigh Riddell and suspended for one match.

=== Suspensions ===
==== VFL/AFL records ====
Longest suspension
Qualification: 20+ matches

Player / Administrator	Charges	Season	Matches suspended	Club	Notes
Stephen Dank	34 x Doping	2016	Life	Essendon	
Doug Fraser	Bribery	1910	99	Carlton	
Alex Lang	Bribery	1910	99	Carlton	
Fred Rutley	2 × kicking, 3 × striking and melee involvement	1925	89	North Melbourne	^{1}
Bill Burns	Kicking	1909	46	Richmond	^{1}
George Topping	Striking	1910	35	Carlton	
Bert Franks	Abusing and threatening an umpire	1910	33	South Melbourne	^{1}
Tommy Downs	Kicking	1931	29	Carlton	
Percy Sheehan	Striking and melee involvement	1910	28	Carlton	
Jack Shorten	Striking and melee involvement	1910	28	Collingwood	
Elijah Taylor	Breach of AFL COVID protocols and bringing the game into disrepute	2020 and 2021	28	Sydney/none	^{2}
Arthur Coghlan	Striking and melee involvement	1925	26	Geelong	
Stan Thomas	Elbowing, striking and melee involvement	1925	26	Geelong	
Dan Keily	Sustained abuse of umpire	1917	24	Carlton	
Arthur Ford	Abusing and threatening umpire	1910	23	Carlton	
Wally Warden	Kicking	1928	22	Footscray	
Ben Cousins	Bringing the game into disrepute	2007	22	none	^{3}
Jaidyn Stephenson	Gambling on AFL matches	2019	22	Collingwood	^{4}
Tom Baxter	Striking and melee involvement	1910	21	Collingwood	^{5}
Ted Whitfield	Attempting to strike an umpire, abusing an umpire and 2 × misconduct	1945	21	South Melbourne	
Dick Condon	Sustained abuse of umpire	1900	20	Collingwood	^{1}
Billy Gent	3 × Striking	1904	20	South Melbourne	
George Holden	Striking	1911	20	Fitzroy	
Peter Reville	3 × Striking	1934	20	South Melbourne	
Phil Carman	Striking and headbutting umpire	1980	20	Essendon	
Chris Appleton	Gambling on AFL matches	2010	20	Goal umpire	
Wayne Siekman	Gambling on AFL matches	2010	20	Interchange steward	
John Wise	Gambling on AFL matches	2010	20	Interchange steward	

^{1} Prior to 1926, some players found guilty of serious offences were given a lifetime suspension, but in each case the penalty was later commuted.
^{2} Taylor was suspended for the rest of the 2020 season (six matches) for violating the AFL's COVID protocols. During this suspension, he was charged with assaulting his girlfriend by police; Taylor pleaded guilty to the charges and was suspended for all of 2021. Since Sydney had deregistered him prior to his second suspension, Taylor was not officially listed as a player at the time of his second suspension.
^{3} Cousins was suspended for a period of twelve months for "bringing the game into disrepute", equating to 22 matches. Since West Coast had deregistered him prior to his suspension, Cousins was not officially listed as a player at the time of his suspension.
^{4} Stephenson's suspension was backdated, meaning he only missed ten matches, having been provisionally suspended.
^{5} Baxter was later exonerated on appeal due to mistaken identity.

==== Not listed above ====
One noteworthy suspension imposed by the VFL/AFL Tribunal was against John Bourke of the Collingwood Reserves: this is not listed above because Bourke was not a member of a senior team.

In an outburst broadcast on Australia's Seven Network on 28 April 1985, Bourke kicked Sydney Swans Reserves ruckman Patrick Foy in the groin in response to Foy tagging him throughout the game. When field umpire Phil Waight attempted to report Bourke for the incident, Bourke shoved Waight to the ground and kicked him, and also made contact with the Collingwood runner who was attempting to take him off the ground before running into the stands to attack a Swans fan.

Bourke was found guilty at the Tribunal of kicking an umpire, kicking and assault, and was suspended for 10 years plus 16 matches (239 matches), which was commuted in 1992 to six years plus 16 matches (151 matches).

It remains one of the most infamous suspensions in the modern history of the sport, and was covered by Australian media for some time afterward.

== See also ==
- NRL Judiciary
