= Fred Rutley =

Australian rules footballer

Personal information
- Full name: Frederick Joseph Rutley
- Born: 10 July 1902; North Melbourne, Victoria
- Died: 28 May 1947 (aged 44); Heidelberg, Victoria
- Original team: North Melbourne (VFA)

Playing career^{1}
| Years | Club | Games (Goals) |
| 1922-1924 | North Melbourne (VFA) | 30 (30) |
| 1925, 1930 | North Melbourne (VFL) | 11 (21) |
- ^{1} Playing statistics correct to the end of 1930.

Frederick Joseph Rutley (10 July 1902 – 28 May 1947) was an Australian rules footballer who played for North Melbourne in both the Victorian Football Association (VFA) (1922-1924) and the Victorian Football League (VFL) (1925, 1930).

== Family ==
The son of Frederick Rowell Rutley (1870-1907), and Sarah Cecilia Rutley (1870-1928), née Kennedy, he was born on 10 July 1902. He married Mary Ellen Johnson (1901-1957) in 1930.

== Football ==
=== North Melbourne (VFA) ===
Making his debut in the round one match of the 1922 season, against Brighton on 6 May 1922, Rutley played 30 senior games with North Melbourne in the Victorian Football Association competition, from 1922 to 1924, scoring 30 goals.

=== North Melbourne (VFL) ===
North Melbourne was admitted to the VFL competition in 1925, and he played his first senior VFL match against Essendon on 23 May 1925. He kicked three goals in both his second and third VFL appearances, and only once in his eleven career games did he fail to kick a goal (i.e., against Carlton on 27 June 1925).

=== All-in brawl ===
He is best remembered for his part in an all-in brawl at half-time in the spiteful Round 12 match, on 1 August 1925, at Arden Street between North Melbourne and Geelong. At the Thursday night's team selection, Rutley had been dropped in favour of Clarrie Nolan; however, he took the field on the Saturday, replacing half-back flanker Curly Linton in the selected side – however, given that he kicked three of North Melbourne's 9 goals, he may not have played in the back line.

Rutley knocked Geelong's Lloyd Hagger to the ground with a round-arm action; Hagger's teammates, Arthur Coghlan and Stan Thomas, remonstrated with Rutley, and the three exchanged punches, starting an all-in brawl which involved players and team officials. Coghlan was hit in the knee with a missile thrown from the crowd, while Geelong captain Cliff Rankin and teammate Syd Hall were left unconscious and had to be carried from the field on stretchers. Geelong were also threatened and pelted with missiles by angry North Melbourne fans while leaving the field at the end of the match.

=== Tribunal penalties ===
Six players were reported on a total of seventeen offences. Rutley, who faced six charges (two counts of kicking Sid Hall, striking Lloyd Hagger, striking Arthur Coghlan, striking Stan Thomas, and melee involvement) pleaded "not guilty", but refused to give evidence.

The head of the League's tribunal was the League's President, Sir Walter Baldwin Spencer, who found all charges sustained, and in passing punishment, informed Rutley:

"The tribunal is of the opinion that this is one of the most serious and worst cases that has ever come before it. Its decision is that you are disqualified for life."

The other players were punished as follows:

- Stan Thomas of Geelong, who was charged with elbowing Bill Russ, striking Rutley and melee involvement, and teammate Arthur Coghlan, who was charged with striking Rutley and melee involvement, were both suspended until 31 December 1926 (26 matches).
- Bill Russ of North Melbourne, who was charged with striking Cliff Rankin and melee involvement, was suspended until 31 December 1925 (5 matches).
- Tim Trevaskis of North Melbourne, who was charged with striking Les Smith and melee involvement, was suspended for 3 matches.
- Harold Johnston of North Melbourne, who was charged with striking Stan Thomas and melee involvement, was reprimanded.

=== Reinstatement ===
Rutley was later reinstated by the VFL, and he returned to play for North Melbourne in 1930, having served a suspension of 89 matches.

His suspension, the third longest in VFL history, is the longest suspension for an on-field incident; the two longer suspensions (99 matches), those of Carlton's Doug Fraser and Alex Lang in 1910, were related to an off-field bribery scandal.

== Death ==
Following a number of years of hospitalisation at the Austin Hospital, he died on 28 May 1947.
