= Heritage Round (AFL) =

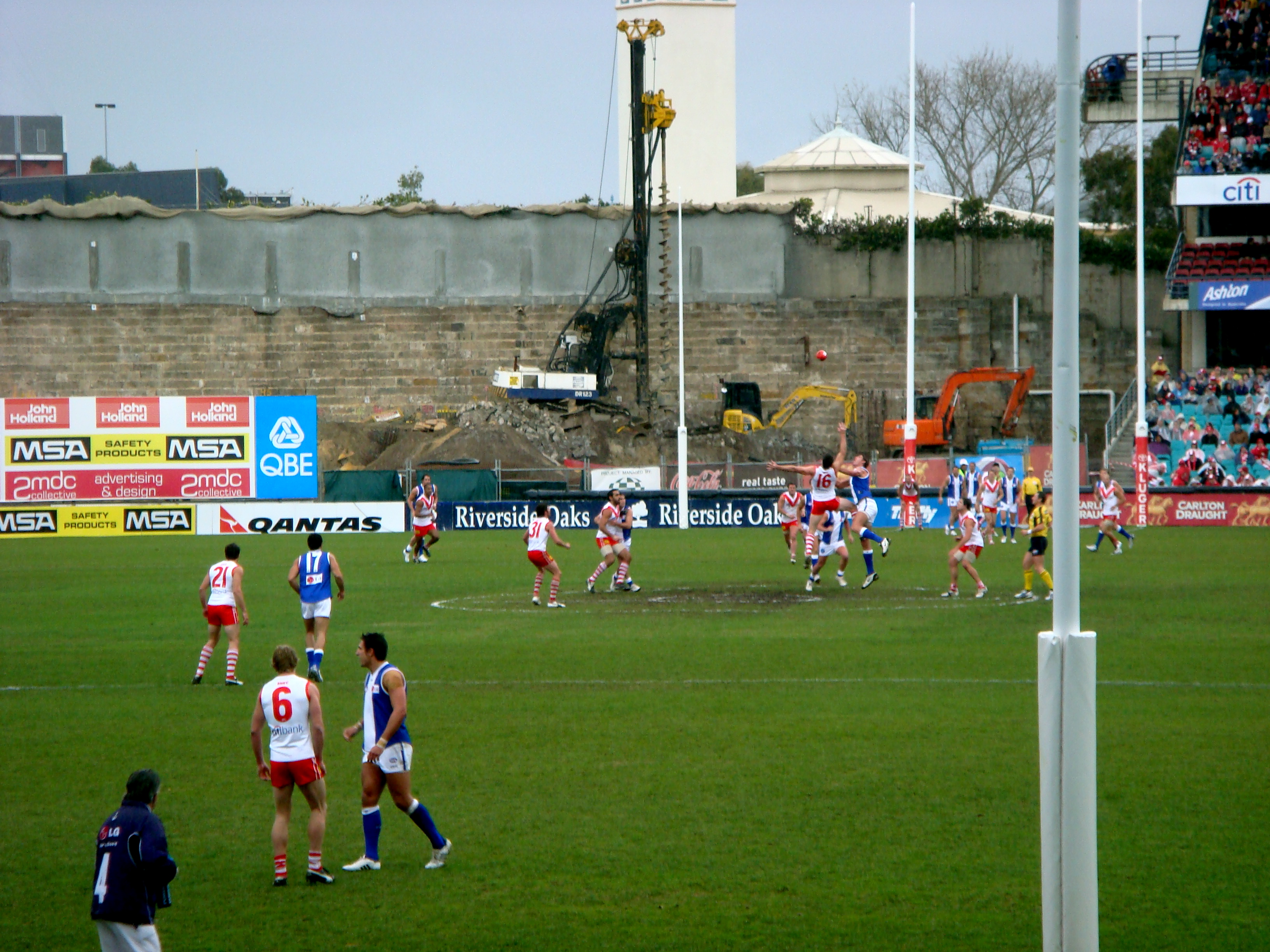
- Fremantle wearing East Fremantle's guernsey against Sydney wearing South Melbourne's guernsey in 2007
- Sport: Australian rules football
- Founded: 2003
- First season: 2003
- Folded: 2008; 18 years ago. Heritage guernseys continue to be worn at discretion of clubs.
- Country: Australia
- Related competitions: AFL

Heritage Round was an annual round of matches in the Australian Football League in which all the teams wore throwback guernseys from the past. The first Heritage Round was in 2003 and the last was in 2007.

Throwback uniforms continue to be worn by clubs on special occasions, but there is no longer a round specifically themed in this manner.

== Origin ==
The concept of the Heritage Round originated from the Centenary Celebration Round, which took place in 1996, the centenary year of the VFL/AFL.

=== 1996 Centenary Round ===
In recognition of the VFL/AFL reaching its 100th season the eight original teams of the VFL played each other in round 7, 100 years after the first round of matches in the inaugural season.

	Round 7 (Centenary Round)
Wednesday, 8 May (8:10 pm)	Essendon 22.11 (143)	def.	Geelong 17.12 (114)	Melbourne Cricket Ground (crowd: 75,632)
Friday, 10 May (8:10 pm)	Collingwood 14.11 (95)	def. by	St Kilda 18.10 (118)	Melbourne Cricket Ground (crowd: 71,663)
Saturday, 11 May (2:10 pm)	Carlton 18.17 (125)	def.	Fitzroy 8.14 (63)	Optus Oval (crowd: 16,176)
Saturday, 11 May (2:10 pm)	Melbourne 5.8 (38)	def. by	Sydney 12.10 (82)	Melbourne Cricket Ground (crowd: 23,660)
The remaining eight clubs played in their normal guernseys, as they came into the VFL/AFL premiership at different times; Richmond (1908) Footscray, Hawthorn, North Melbourne (1925) Brisbane, West Coast (1987) Adelaide (1991) Fremantle (1995).

==== 1996 Centenary uniforms ====
- Carlton Blues — 1897–1913 guernsey
- Collingwood Magpies — 1897–1907 guernsey
- Essendon Bombers — 1900–1921 guernsey
- Fitzroy Lions — 1883–1907 guernsey
- Geelong Cats — 1891–1907 guernsey
- Melbourne Demons — 1877–1915 guernsey
- St Kilda Saints — 1883–1911 guernsey
- South Melbourne/Sydney Swans — 1905–1906 guernsey

Adelaide
Brisbane
Carlton
Collingwood
Essendon
Fitzroy
Footscray
Fremantle
Geelong
Hawthorn
Melbourne
North Melbourne
Richmond
St Kilda
Sydney
West Coast
- Carlton Blues — 1897–1913 guernsey
- Collingwood Magpies — 1897–1907 guernsey
- Essendon Bombers — 1900–1921 guernsey
- Fitzroy Lions — 1883–1907 guernsey
- Geelong Cats — 1891–1907 guernsey
- Melbourne Demons — 1877–1915 guernsey
- St Kilda Saints — 1883–1911 guernsey
- South Melbourne/Sydney Swans — 1905–1906 guernsey

== Heritage Round (2003–2007) ==
=== 2003 Heritage Round ===
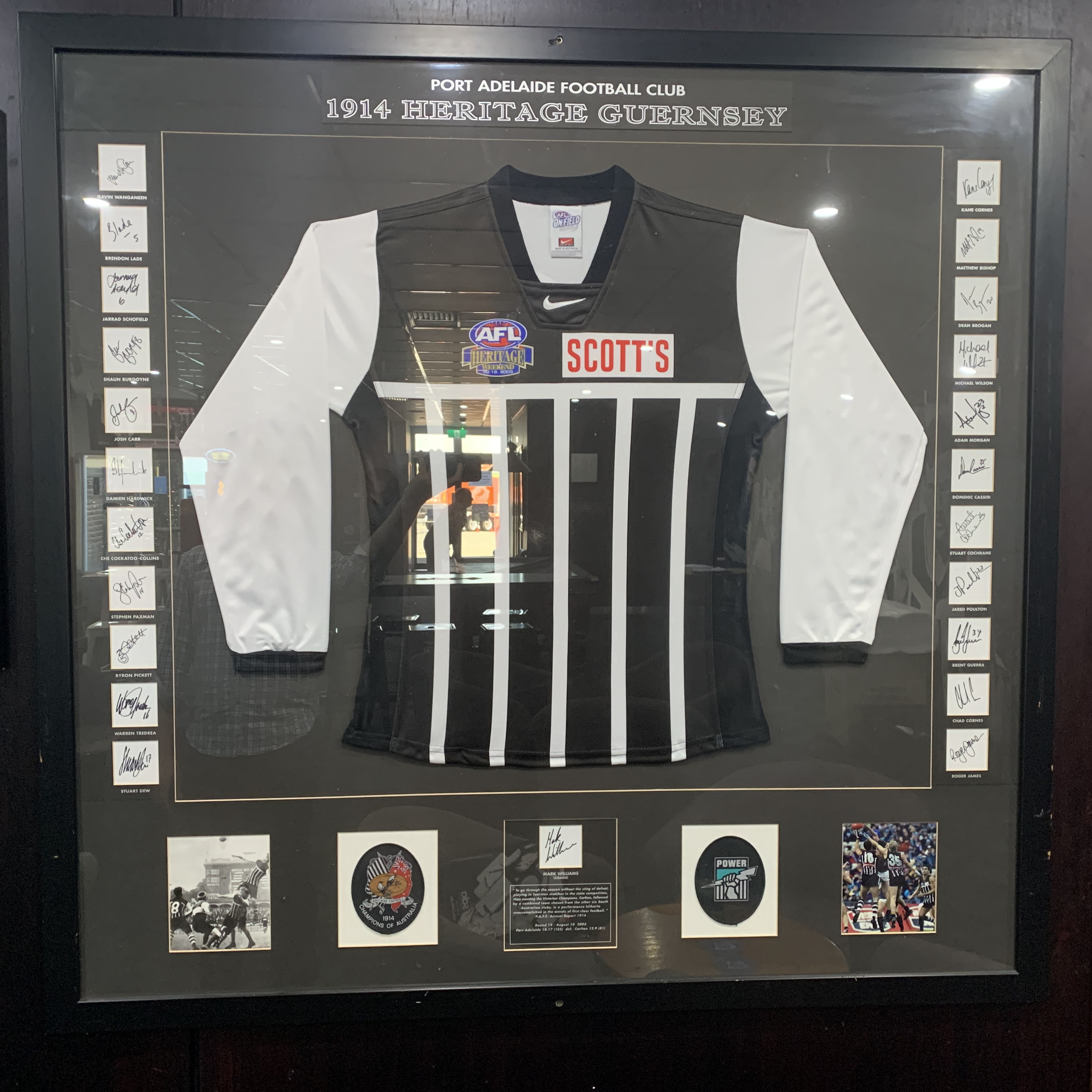
Port Adelaide's 2003 AFL Heritage Round guernsey on display at Alberton Oval

The first Heritage Round in 2003 saw heritage guernseys worn by all teams except two. It was seen in a very positive and nostalgic light, especially as Brisbane Lions wore the 1968 to 1973 Fitzroy guernsey, which was maroon and navy blue, as worn during the days of black and white television. Sydney wore their 1933 to 1986 guernsey, worn during their time when based in South Melbourne.

St Kilda's guernsey got such a positive reaction that it became their clash guernsey from 2004 until 2006.

Port Adelaide wore its SANFL Magpies "Prison Bar" guernsey from 1914 when the club defeat Carlton to win the 1914 Championship of Australia.

	2003 Round 19 (Heritage Round)
Friday, 8 August (7:40 pm)	Melbourne 6.9 (45)	def. by	Geelong 11.18 (84)	Melbourne Cricket Ground (crowd: 22,508)
Saturday, 9 August (2:10 pm)	Collingwood 8.14 (62)	def. by	Brisbane Lions 15.11 (101)	Melbourne Cricket Ground (crowd: 61,868)
Saturday, 9 August (1:40 pm)	West Coast 10.7 (67)	def. by	Adelaide 13.13 (91)	Subiaco Oval (crowd: 39,681)
Saturday, 9 August (7:10 pm)	Sydney 14.9 (93)	def. by	Hawthorn 17.8 (110)	Sydney Cricket Ground (crowd: 33,473)
Saturday, 9 August (7:10 pm)	Richmond 7.8 (50)	def. by	St Kilda 20.10 (130)	Telstra Dome (crowd: 41,514)
Sunday, 10 August (12:40 pm)	Port Adelaide 18.17 (125)	def.	Carlton 12.9 (81)	AAMI Stadium (crowd: 31,083)
Sunday, 10 August (2:10 pm)	Essendon 22.15 (147)	def.	Western Bulldogs 12.8 (80)	Telstra Dome (crowd: 36,138)
Sunday, 10 August (2:10 pm)	Kangaroos 15.8 (98)	def. by	Fremantle 15.9 (99)	Melbourne Cricket Ground (crowd: 18,486)
Adelaide and West Coast did not participate in wearing heritage guernseys.

=== 2003 heritage uniforms ===
- Adelaide Crows — 2003–2003 home guernsey
- Brisbane Lions — 1968–1973 Fitzroy Lions guernsey
- Carlton Blues — 1897 guernsey with Monogram from 1910 guernsey
- Collingwood Magpies — 1928–1952 guernsey
- Essendon Bombers — 1897–1974 guernsey
- Footscray/Western Bulldogs — 1935–1935 guernsey
- Fremantle Dockers — 1896–1899 Union/Fremantle guernsey
- Geelong Cats — 1897–1907 guernsey
- Hawthorn Hawks — 1926–1932 guernsey
- Melbourne Demons — 1897–1915 guernsey
- North Melbourne Kangaroos — 1925–1928 guernsey
- Port Adelaide Power — 1912–1916 guernsey
- Richmond Tigers — 1908–1909 guernsey
- St Kilda Saints — 1886–1892 guernsey
- Sydney Swans — 1933–1976 South Melbourne Swans guernsey
- West Coast Eagles — 2003–2003 home guernsey

Adelaide	Brisbane	Carlton	Collingwood
Essendon	Fremantle	Geelong	Hawthorn
Melbourne	North Melbourne	Port Adelaide	Richmond
St Kilda	Sydney	West Coast	Western Bulldogs

=== 2004 Heritage Round ===
The second Heritage Round in 2004 saw all 16 clubs wear a heritage guernsey. This was the first year which the field and goal umpires wore uniforms from the past as well. All the umpires wore white uniforms (the traditional colour the umpires wore before changing to coloured uniforms) and the goal umpires wore their traditional long coats and white brimmed hats.

Brisbane Lions chose to wear the Brisbane Bears guernsey worn from 1992 until 1996. West Coast wore a replica of their 1987 gold and blue guernsey. Adelaide wore a manufactured guernsey based on a 1991 original with the SANFL logo on the back and AFC monogram on the front. Port Adelaide wore a magenta and blue guernsey based on their original guernsey from 1877 to 1901, prior to its famous black and white "Prison Bar" guernsey.

	2004 Round 18 (Heritage Round)
Friday, 30 July (8:10 pm)	Adelaide 5.19 (49)	def.	Kangaroos 5.12 (42)	AAMI Stadium (crowd: 37,562)
Saturday, 31 July (2:10 pm)	Collingwood 15.13 (103)	def.	Richmond 14.14 (98)	MCG (crowd: 39,933)
Saturday, 31 July (2:10 pm)	Carlton 9.9 (63)	def. by	Fremantle 16.15 (111)	Optus Oval (crowd: 17,092)
Saturday, 31 July (7:10 pm)	Essendon 18.11 (119)	def.	Port Adelaide 11.13 (79)	Telstra Dome (crowd: 35,711)
Saturday, 31 July (7:10 pm)	Sydney 12.11 (83)	def.	Brisbane Lions 7.9 (51)	SCG (crowd: 34,926)
Sunday, 1 August (1:10 pm)	Geelong 15.11 (101)	def.	St Kilda 15.4 (94)	Skilled Stadium (crowd: 21,673)
Sunday, 1 August (2:10 pm)	Melbourne 15.17 (107)	def.	Hawthorn 9.9 (63)	MCG (crowd: 28,392)
Sunday, 1 August (2:10 pm)	West Coast 15.16 (106)	def.	Western Bulldogs 8.9 (57)	Subiaco Oval (crowd: 36,028)

=== 2004 heritage uniforms ===
- Adelaide Crows — 1991–2003 home guernsey with AFC club crest
- Brisbane Lions — 1992–1996 Brisbane Bears guernsey
- Carlton Blues — 1897 guernsey with monogram from 1910 guernsey
- Collingwood Magpies — 1923–1952 guernsey
- Essendon Bombers — 1897–1974 guernsey
- Footscray/Western Bulldogs — 1946, 1952–1960 guernsey
- Fremantle Dockers — 1896–1899 Union/Fremantle guernsey
- Geelong Cats — 1897–1907 guernsey
- Hawthorn Hawks — 1926–1932 guernsey
- Melbourne Demons — 1897 guernsey and 1919 guernsey
- North Melbourne Kangaroos — 1886–1908 guernsey
- Port Adelaide Power — 1896–1901 guernsey
- Richmond Tigers — 1889–1895 guernsey
- St Kilda Saints — 1933–1944 guernsey
- Sydney Swans — 1933–1976 South Melbourne Swans guernsey
- West Coast Eagles — 1987 (from Round 01)–1988 (to Round 16) guernsey

Adelaide	Brisbane	Carlton	Collingwood
Essendon	Fremantle	Geelong	Hawthorn
Melbourne	North Melbourne	Port Adelaide	Richmond
St Kilda	Sydney	West Coast	Western Bulldogs

=== 2005 Heritage Round ===
The third Heritage Round was held in 2005. The field umpires wore replica uniforms from an old fashioned period (with colours brought back) that were impractical in the modern day.

St Kilda wore a guernsey worn during the First World War in which white was replaced with gold so they would not be seen as a supporter of Germany. Hawthorn's guernsey was not brown and gold, but red, white, and blue from its 1902 guernsey worn when they were a junior club. Adelaide wore a 1930s South Australia state guernsey with an AFC insignia replacing SA. Port Adelaide Football Club wore a white guernsey with light blue hoops based on their first guernsey in the SANFL.

	2005 Round 20 (Heritage Round)
Friday, 12 August (6:40 pm)	West Coast 19.14 (128)	def.	Fremantle 12.8 (80)	Subiaco Oval (crowd: 40,720)
Saturday, 13 August (2:10 pm)	Geelong 15.9 (99)	def. by	Melbourne 14.16 (100)	Skilled Stadium (crowd: 20,148)
Saturday, 13 August (2:10 pm)	Kangaroos 13.7 (85)	def. by	St Kilda 16.12 (108)	Telstra Dome (crowd: 39,777)
Saturday, 13 August (7:10 pm)	Collingwood 14.10 (94)	def. by	Carlton 19.15 (129)	MCG (crowd: 48,287)
Saturday, 13 August (7:10 pm)	Port Adelaide 12.9 (81)	def. by	Adelaide 13.10 (88)	AAMI Stadium (crowd: 45,199)
Sunday, 14 August (1:10 pm)	Sydney 19.10 (124)	def.	Brisbane Lions 6.4 (40)	Telstra Stadium (crowd: 43,512)
Sunday, 14 August (2:10 pm)	Hawthorn 17.15 (117)	def.	Essendon 16.8 (104)	MCG (crowd: 32,053)
Sunday, 14 August (2:10 pm)	Richmond 16.11 (107)	def. by	Western Bulldogs 18.11 (119)	Telstra Dome (crowd: 33,482)

=== 2005 heritage uniforms ===
- Adelaide Crows — 1930s South Australia guernsey with AFC club crest
- Brisbane Lions — 1968–1973 Fitzroy Lions guernsey
- Carlton Blues — 1933–1997 guernsey with monogram from 1998–2014 guernsey
- Collingwood Magpies — 1928–1952 guernsey
- Essendon Bombers — 1897–1974 guernsey
- Footscray/Western Bulldogs — 1946, 1952–1960 guernsey
- Fremantle Dockers — 1896–1899 Union/Fremantle guernsey
- Geelong Cats — 1914–1918 guernsey
- Hawthorn Hawks — 1902–1902 guernsey
- Melbourne Demons — 1897 guernsey and 1919 guernsey
- North Melbourne Kangaroos — 1925–1928 guernsey with North Story logo
- Port Adelaide Power — 1870–1876 guernsey
- Richmond Tigers — 1980–1986 guernsey
- St Kilda Saints — 1915–1918 guernsey
- Sydney Swans — 1933–1976 South Melbourne Swans guernsey
- West Coast Eagles — 1987 (from Round 01)–1988 (to Round 16) guernsey

Adelaide
Brisbane
Carlton
Collingwood
Essendon
Fremantle
Geelong
Hawthorn
Melbourne
North Melbourne
Port Adelaide
Richmond
St Kilda
Sydney
West Coast
Western Bulldogs
- Adelaide Crows — 1930s South Australia guernsey with AFC club crest
- Brisbane Lions — 1968–1973 Fitzroy Lions guernsey
- Carlton Blues — 1933–1997 guernsey with monogram from 1998–2014 guernsey
- Collingwood Magpies — 1928–1952 guernsey
- Essendon Bombers — 1897–1974 guernsey
- Footscray/Western Bulldogs — 1946, 1952–1960 guernsey
- Fremantle Dockers — 1896–1899 Union/Fremantle guernsey
- Geelong Cats — 1914–1918 guernsey
- Hawthorn Hawks — 1902–1902 guernsey
- Melbourne Demons — 1897 guernsey and 1919 guernsey
- North Melbourne Kangaroos — 1925–1928 guernsey with North Story logo
- Port Adelaide Power — 1870–1876 guernsey
- Richmond Tigers — 1980–1986 guernsey
- St Kilda Saints — 1915–1918 guernsey
- Sydney Swans — 1933–1976 South Melbourne Swans guernsey
- West Coast Eagles — 1987 (from Round 01)–1988 (to Round 16) guernsey

=== 2006 Heritage Round ===
The fourth Heritage Round in 2006 was themed around football in the 1980s. This received very heavy media coverage. The AFL Footy Show and Before the Game took on 1980s themes and dressed in clothes from the 1980s. The AFL released a compilation CD of songs recorded during the 1980s.

Brisbane Lions wore the 1987 to 1990 Brisbane Bears away/clash guernsey, a variant of its original gold and cerise Brisbane Bears guernsey. Adelaide, who were non-existent in the 1980s, wore a modified home guernsey, including a monogrammed crest featuring the colours of all the teams in the SANFL from the 1980s. Melbourne wore a guernsey with red and royal blue instead of its red and navy blue it used prior to 1974 with the introduction of colour TV. Richmond wore yellow shorts from the 1980s with their 1980s guernsey with printed laces. Essendon wore red shorts as they did in the 1980s when they played Carlton. West Coast wore a replica of their 1988 to 1994 blue and gold guernsey.

The AFL prevented Port Adelaide from wearing their 1980s SANFL guernsey.

	2006 Round 16 (Heritage Round)
Friday, 21 July (8:10 )	Adelaide 19.10 (124)	def.	Kangaroos 7.10 (52)	AAMI Stadium (crowd: 47,487)
Saturday, 22 July (2:10 pm)	Collingwood 19.13 (127)	def.	West Coast 13.12 (90)	Telstra Dome (crowd: 38,777)
Saturday, 22 July (2:10 pm)	Essendon 16.9 (105)	drew with	Carlton 15.15 (105)	MCG (crowd: 49,181)
Saturday, 22 July (7:10 pm)	Brisbane Lions 11.18 (88)	def.	Hawthorn 11.8 (74)	The Gabba (crowd: 26,738)
Saturday, 22 July (7:10 pm)	Sydney 14.17 (107)	def.	Richmond 7.11 (53)	SCG (crowd: 28,371)
Sunday, 23 July (1:10 pm)	St Kilda 8.16 (64)	def.	Port Adelaide 8.12 (60)	Aurora Stadium (crowd: 16,588)
Sunday, 23 July (2:10 pm)	Geelong 13.12 (90)	def.	Western Bulldogs 13.11 (89)	Telstra Dome (crowd: 39,417)
Sunday, 23 July (2:40 pm)	Fremantle 15.6 (96)	def.	Melbourne 9.13 (67)	Subiaco Oval (crowd: 36,244)

=== 2006 heritage uniforms ===
- Adelaide Crows — 2006–2006 manufactured home guernsey with AFC club crest and coloured stripes of the SANFL clubs
- Brisbane Lions — 1987–1990 Brisbane Bears away/clash guernsey
- Carlton Blues — 1933–1997 guernsey
- Collingwood Magpies — 1981–1981 guernsey
- Essendon Bombers — 1975–2005 guernsey with red shorts
- Footscray/Western Bulldogs — 1980–1996 guernsey
- Fremantle Dockers — 1896–1899 Union/Fremantle guernsey
- Geelong Cats — 1981–1993 guernsey
- Hawthorn Hawks — 1980–1989 guernsey
- Melbourne Demons — 1975–1989 guernsey
- North Melbourne Kangaroos — 1987–1995 guernsey
- Port Adelaide Power — 2004–2006 away/clash guernsey
- Richmond Tigers — 1981–1986 guernsey with printed laces and with yellow shorts
- St Kilda Saints — 1986–1996 guernsey
- Sydney Swans — 1933–1976 South Melbourne Swans guernsey
- West Coast Eagles — 1988 (from Round 17)–1994 (to Grand Final) away/clash/home guernsey

Adelaide
Brisbane
Carlton
Collingwood
Essendon
Fremantle
Geelong
Hawthorn
North Melbourne
Melbourne
Port Adelaide
Richmond
St Kilda
Sydney
West Coast
Western Bulldogs
- Adelaide Crows — 2006–2006 manufactured home guernsey with AFC club crest and coloured stripes of the SANFL clubs
- Brisbane Lions — 1992–1990 Brisbane Bears away/clash guernsey
- Carlton Blues — 1933–1997 guernsey
- Collingwood Magpies — 1981–1981 guernsey
- Essendon Bombers — 1975–2005 guernsey with red shorts
- Footscray/Western Bulldogs — 1980–1996 guernsey
- Fremantle Dockers — 1896–1899 Union/Fremantle guernsey
- Geelong Cats — 1981–1993 guernsey
- Hawthorn Hawks — 1980–1989 guernsey
- Melbourne Demons — 1975–1989 guernsey
- North Melbourne Kangaroos — 1987–1995 guernsey
- Port Adelaide Power — 2004–2006 away/clash guernsey
- Richmond Tigers — 1981–1986 guernsey with printed laces and with yellow shorts
- St Kilda Saints — 1986–1996 guernsey
- Sydney Swans — 1933–1976 South Melbourne Swans guernsey
- West Coast Eagles — 1988 (from Round 17)–1994 (to Grand Final) away/clash/home guernsey

=== 2007 Heritage Round ===
The fifth Heritage Round in 2007 was based on football in the 1970s. It took place from 7 to 9 July. Once again it generated media coverage both in news broadcasts, with both The Footy Show and Before the Game holding 1970s themed shows.

As the West Coast Eagles were not established in the 1970s, they chose to wear the original Western Australia guernsey from the first State of Origin game played against Victoria. They lost to the Brisbane Lions, who wore the red and blue Fitzroy guernsey worn from 1975 to 1978. Adelaide wore the same guernsey as what was worn in the 2006 Heritage Round in its defeat against Hawthorn. Port Adelaide's application to the AFL for its 1970s black and white "Prison Bar" was rejected at first, but an agreement was later reached with Collingwood and the AFL for Port Adelaide to wear the guernsey this year, but with conditions for further heritage rounds. They lost to the Western Bulldogs, who wore an original Footscray guernsey with red shorts. As Essendon and Richmond were both still wearing guernseys with no major change from what was worn in the 1970s, Essendon once again wore red shorts and Richmond wore yellow shorts in their respective matches.

Two teams did not wear a heritage guernsey: St Kilda, who instead wore their white clash guernsey, and Collingwood.

Other teams to not wear a heritage guernsey due to extreme similarities to current day versions included Geelong, Carlton (whose monogram was the current version and not the one worn from 1933 to 1997), and Kangaroos (North Melbourne).

Fremantle opted to wear a historical East Fremantle guernsey as they were playing the Sydney that round, resulting in the teams taking the field in uniforms almost identical to those of the 1979 WAFL Grand Final - the Fremantle Derby Grand Final between East Fremantle and South Fremantle.

	2007 Round 14 (Heritage Round)
Friday, 6 July (7:40 pm)	Essendon 12.11 (83)	def. by	Geelong 19.19 (133)	Telstra Dome (crowd: 51,156)
Saturday, 7 July (2:10 pm)	Collingwood 12.17 (89)	def.	St Kilda 12.8 (80)	MCG (crowd: 57,247)
Saturday, 7 July (2:10 pm)	Western Bulldogs 20.13 (133)	def.	Port Adelaide 17.11 (113)	Telstra Dome (crowd: 22,691 )
Saturday, 7 July (5:40 pm)	West Coast 9.10 (64)	def. by	Brisbane Lions 13.13 (91)	Subiaco Oval (crowd: 40,763)
Saturday, 7 July (7:10 pm)	Adelaide 15.12 (102)	def.	Hawthorn 4.7 (31)	AAMI Stadium (crowd: 34,733)
Sunday, 8 July (1:10 pm)	Sydney 11.23 (89)	def.	Fremantle 9.7 (61)	SCG (crowd: 25,493)
Sunday, 8 July (2:10 pm)	Carlton 14.17 (101)	def. by	Melbourne 19.10 (124)	MCG (crowd: 33,085)
Sunday, 8 July (5:10 pm)	Richmond 11.13 (79)	def. by	Kangaroos 14.20 (104)	Telstra Dome (crowd: 33,583)

=== 2007 heritage uniforms ===
- Adelaide Crows — 2007–2007 manufactured home guernsey with AFC club crest and coloured stripes of the SANFL clubs
- Brisbane Lions — 1992–1978 Fitzroy Lions guernsey
- Carlton Blues — 1933–1997 guernsey
- Collingwood Magpies — 1981–1981 guernsey
- Essendon Bombers — 1975–2006 guernsey with red shorts
- Footscray/Western Bulldogs — 1975–1979 guernsey
- Fremantle Dockers — 1964–1976 East Fremantle guernsey
- Geelong Cats — 1976–1977 guernsey
- Hawthorn Hawks — 1978–1990 guernsey
- Melbourne Demons — 1975–1989 guernsey
- North Melbourne Kangaroos — 1975–1975 guernsey
- Port Adelaide Power — 1977–1977 SANFL 100 guernsey
- Richmond Tigers — 1975–1975 guernsey with yellow shorts
- St Kilda Saints — 2007–2007 away/clash guernsey
- Sydney Swans — 1933–1976 South Melbourne Swans guernsey
- West Coast Eagles — 1977 Western Australia guernsey

Adelaide
Brisbane
Carlton
Collingwood
Essendon
Fremantle
Geelong
Hawthorn
Melbourne
North Melbourne
Port Adelaide
Richmond
St Kilda
Sydney
West Coast
Western Bulldogs
- Adelaide Crows — 2007–2007 manufactured home guernsey with AFC club crest and coloured stripes of the SANFL clubs
- Brisbane Lions — 1992–1978 Fitzroy Lions guernsey
- Carlton Blues — 1933–1997 guernsey
- Collingwood Magpies — 1981–1981 guernsey
- Essendon Bombers — 1975–2006 guernsey with red shorts
- Footscray/Western Bulldogs — 1975–1979 guernsey
- Fremantle Dockers — 1964–1976 East Fremantle guernsey
- Geelong Cats — 1976–1977 guernsey
- Hawthorn Hawks — 1978–1990 guernsey
- Melbourne Demons — 1975–1989 guernsey
- North Melbourne Kangaroos — 1975–1975 guernsey
- Port Adelaide Power — 1977–1977 SANFL 100 guernsey
- Richmond Tigers — 1975–1975 guernsey with yellow shorts
- St Kilda Saints — 2007–2007 away/clash guernsey
- Sydney Swans — 1933–1976 South Melbourne Swans guernsey
- West Coast Eagles — 1977 Western Australia guernsey

== Controversy ==
Port Adelaide is the only pre-existing non-Victorian AFL club, having joined the national competition in 1997 after having played in the SANFL since 1877. Before joining the AFL, Port Adelaide used a Magpie moniker and wore a black and white guernsey with six vertical stripes and one horizontal stripe. This guernsey is similar to that of Collingwood, a black and white guernsey with three stripes of black and white which has been a part of the VFL/AFL since 1897. When Port Adelaide joined the AFL they adopted a new moniker, Power, and added two new colours to their palette, teal and silver. During the 2006 Heritage Round, which adopted a 1980s theme, Port Adelaide was prevented by the AFL from taking part. During the 1980s, Port Adelaide won four SANFL premierships (1980, 1981, 1988, 1989) wearing its Prison Bar' guernsey. The following year, Port Adelaide, Collingwood and the AFL came to an agreement that Port Adelaide would be able to use their 'Prison Bar' guernsey in future Heritage Rounds. However, after this agreement was reached, the AFL ceased sanctioning official Heritage Rounds. In 2021, Eddie McGuire noted that he knew at the time of signing the agreement with Port Adelaide that Heritage Rounds would cease to be officially sanctioned by the AFL in the future.

== See also ==
- NRL Heritage Round
