= Archie Wilson =

Archibald or Archie Wilson may refer to:

- Archibald Wilson (1921–2014), Rhodesian fighter pilot and politician
- Archie Wilson (Australian footballer) (1888–1961), Australian rules footballer
- Archie Wilson (footballer, born 1890) (1890–1916), English footballer
- Archie F. Wilson (1903–1960), American wood collector
- Archie Wilson (baseball) (1923–2007), baseball player
- Archibald Wilson (Northern Ireland politician) (fl.1945–1956), member of the Parliament of Northern Ireland for Belfast Windsor 1945–1956
- Sir Archibald Duncan Wilson (diplomat) (1911–1983), British diplomat and master of Corpus Christi College, Cambridge
