= Tom McCluskey =

Australian rules footballer

Personal information
- Full name: Thomas Miller McCluskey
- Nickname: Tammas
- Born: 31 August 1890; Kyabram, Victoria
- Died: 4 October 1917 (aged 27); Broodseinde, Passchendaele salient, Belgium
- Original team: Shepparton (GVDFA)

Playing career^{1}
Years	Club	Games (Goals)
1910	Carlton (VFL)	4 (0)
1911	Fitzroy (VFL)	5 (0)
1912—1914	Footscray (VFA)	45 (0)
Total		54 (0)
- ^{1} Playing statistics correct to the end of 1911.

Thomas Miller "Tammas" McCluskey (31 August 1890 – 4 October 1917) was an Australian rules footballer who played with Carlton and Fitzroy in the Victorian Football League, and with Footscray in the Victorian Football Association (VFA).

== Family ==
The son of Thomas Miller McCluskey (1843–1929), and Jessie Blair McCluskey (1855–1897), née Bell, Thomas Miller McCluskey, known to his family as "Tammas", was born in Kyabram, on 31 August 1890.

== Football ==
=== Carlton (VFL) ===
A half-back flanker, McCluskey was recruited from Shepparton Football Club, by the Carlton Secretary, Arthur Ford, who, having been alerted to the potential of McCluskey, had gone to see a match between Tatura and Shepparton on Wednesday 24 August 1910, and was so impressed that he immediately signed up both Shepparton's McClusky and Tatura's Archie Wilson.

Wilson and McClusky both made their debut for Carlton against Richmond, at Princes Park, on the following Saturday, 27 August 1910, and both played for the Carlton First XVIII that lost to Collingwood in the 1910 Grand Final, which was the last of McCluskey's four senior games for Carlton.

=== Fitzroy (VFL) ===
In 1911 he transferred to Fitzroy, where he played 5 senior games.

=== Footscray (VFA) ===
In 1912 McCluskey was living and working in Footscray, and on 24 April 1912, he was granted a clearance from Fitzroy to play with Footscray. He played 45 matches in three seasons (1912–1914).

== Military ==
McCluskey served on the Western Front during World War I, being killed by a German artillery shell during the Battle of Broodseinde.

== See also ==
- List of Victorian Football League players who died on active service
