= Tommy Lamprell =

Australian rules footballer

Personal information
- Full name: Thomas Jubilee Burnett Lamprell
- Born: 8 June 1887; Mount Prospect, Victoria
- Died: 25 August 1937 (aged 50); Fitzroy, Victoria
- Original team: North Lyell

Playing career^{1}
Years	Club	Games (Goals)
1910	St Kilda	1 (2)
- ^{1} Playing statistics correct to the end of 1910.

Thomas Jubilee Burnett Lamprell (8 June 1887 – 25 August 1937) was an Australian rules footballer who played with St Kilda in the Victorian Football League (VFL).

== Family ==
The son of Charles Lamprell (–1898), and Jane Lamprell (−1906), née Searle, Thomas Jubilee Burnett Lamprell was born at Mount Prospect, in Victoria, on 8 June 1887.

=== Marriages ===
He married Blanche Lamprell on 28 December 1909; they were divorced in 1922.

He married Ettie May Clark (−1929) in 1923.

He married Laura Isobel McLeod in 1934.

== Football ==
=== St Kilda (VFL) ===
Granted a clearance from North Lyell Football Club in Tasmania to St Kilda on 18 May 1910, he played his single match for St Kilda, against Collingwood, on 21 May 1910.

=== Footscray (VFA) ===
He played 11 matches for Footscray in two seasons (1910, 1911).

=== Williamstown (VFA) ===
He played for Williamstown after crossing from Footscray during 1911 and in the first four matches of the 1912 season. He played a total of 11 games and kicked 6 goals for 'Town.

On 25 May 1912, "Observer", the football correspondent of The Williamstown Chronicle, reported that, "Lamprell has displeased the committee and will consequently 'stand down' for a while".

== Death ==
He died at St Vincent's Hospital in Fitzroy on 25 August 1937.
