= John Nilen =

Australian rules footballer

Personal information
- Full name: John William Nilen
- Born: 30 January 1878; Alexandra, Victoria
- Died: 11 July 1963 (aged 85); Bunbury, Western Australia

Playing career^{1}
| Years | Club | Games (Goals) |
| 1910 | St Kilda | 1 (0) |
- ^{1} Playing statistics correct to the end of 1910.

John William Nilen (30 January 1878 – 11 July 1963) was an Australian rules footballer who played with St Kilda in the Victorian Football League (VFL).

== Family ==
The son of Patrick Nilen, and Elizabeth Nilen, née McElroy, John William Nilen was born on 30 January 1878.

== Football ==
Cleared from Kalgoorlie to St Kilda on 18 May 1910, he played his only VFL First XVIII match for St Kilda, aged 32, against Collingwood, as a forward-pocket ruckman, at Victoria Park, on 21 May 1910 (round 3).
