= Archie Wilson (Australian footballer) =

Australian rules footballer

Personal information
- Full name: Archibald William Wilson
- Born: 25 April 1888; Tatura, Victoria
- Died: 7 July 1961 (aged 73); Mooroopna, Victoria
- Original team: Tatura
- Height: 183 cm (6 ft 0 in)
- Weight: 83 kg (183 lb)
- Position: Follower

Playing career^{1}
Years	Club	Games (Goals)
1910–1913	Carlton	31 (1)
- ^{1} Playing statistics correct to the end of 1913.

Archibald William Wilson (25 April 1888 – 7 July 1961) was an Australian rules footballer who played for the Carlton Football Club in the Victorian Football League (VFL).

== Family ==
The son of James Watson Wilson (1859-1939), and Mary Young Wilson (1855-1927), née Forsyth, Archibald William Wilson was born at Tatura, Victoria on 25 April 1888.

He married Elsie Jane Clydesdale (1890-1973) on 20 February 1915.

== Football ==
=== (Carlton VFL) ===
He was recruited from Tatura Football Club by the Carlton Secretary, Arthur Ford, who, having been alerted to the potential of the Shepparton player, Tom McCluskey, had gone to see a match between Tatura and Shepparton on Wednesday 24 August 1910, and was so impressed that he immediately signed up both Shepparton's McClusky and Tatura's Wilson.

Wilson and McClusky both made their debut for Carlton against Richmond, at Princes Park, on the following Saturday, 27 August 1910, and both played for the Carlton First XVIII that lost to Collingwood in the 1910 Grand Final.

== Death ==
He died at the Mooroopna Hospital on 7 July 1961.
