= 1925 VFL season =

29th season of the Victorian Football League (VFL)

1925 VFL premiership season
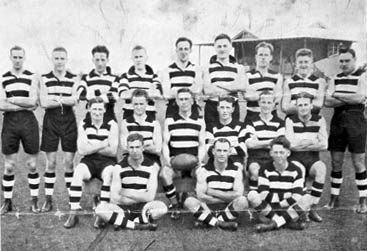
- Geelong 1925 VFL premiership team

Overview
- Date: 2 May – 10 October 1925
- Teams: 12
- Premiers: Geelong; 1st premiership
- Runners-up: Collingwood; 8th runners-up result
- Minor premiers: Geelong; 3rd minor premiership
- Brownlow Medallist: Colin Watson (St Kilda); 9 votes
- Leading goalkicker medallist: Lloyd Hagger (Geelong); 70 goals

Attendance
- Matches played: 106
- Total attendance: 1,871,336 (17,654 per match)
- Highest (H&A): 38,000 (round 6, Richmond v Melbourne)
- Highest (finals): 64,288 (grand final, Geelong v Collingwood)

The 1925 VFL season was the 29th season of the Victorian Football League (VFL), the highest-level senior Australian rules football competition in Victoria. The season featured twelve clubs and ran from 2 May to 10 October, comprising a 17-match home-and-away season followed by a four-week finals series featuring the top four clubs. Victorian Football Association (VFA) clubs Footscray, Hawthorn and North Melbourne featured for the first time in 1925.

Geelong won the premiership, defeating Collingwood by ten points in the 1925 VFL grand final; it was Geelong's first VFL premiership. Geelong also won the minor premiership by finishing atop the home-and-away ladder with a 15–2 win–loss record. St Kilda's Colin Watson won the Brownlow Medal as the league's best and fairest player, and Geelong's Lloyd Hagger won the leading goalkicker medal as the league's leading goalkicker.

== Background ==
=== Public Service Football Club ===
In July 1924, the Public Service Football Club, a club whose players would consist entirely of state and federal public servants rather than being drawn from a geographical recruiting district, was established and applied to join the VFL. Melbourne Carnivals Ltd had offered to lease the Public Service club its newly developed venue, the Amateur Sports Ground, for football if it could gain entrance to the league. The venue was centrally located, between Batman Avenue and Swan Street, the site which later became Olympic Park, and was to have been expanded to a capacity of 100,000. The VFL was keen to have control over the venue, and equally keen to prevent the VFA or the local rugby league or soccer associations from controlling such a valuable asset.

Since the end of World War I, the VFL had contained nine clubs; and, while the League had taken applications several times for a tenth club, it had each time opted to remain at nine clubs. But, the availability of the Amateur Sports Ground was an important strategic opportunity, and in September 1924, the VFL formally resolved to "draw up a scheme for the inclusion of one or more clubs, and secure the Amateur Sports Ground for the League" before the 1925 season.

=== Claims of the Footscray Football Club ===
While the league reviewed the application of the Public Service, it was also fielding other applications, most notably that of the Footscray Football Club from the VFA. Footscray was widely regarded as the strongest candidate among existing clubs to join the VFL, and had been considered as such for many years. It was the richest VFA club, had a strong corporate backing due to its location in the heart of the industrial district of the western suburbs, and it had dominated the Association since the war, winning four of the previous six premierships and five minor premierships in a row. Its win against VFL premiers Essendon in Dame Nellie Melba's Limbless Soldiers' Appeal match at the end of the 1924 season had affirmed its credentials.

Admitting the Public Service team would have met both of the League's aims, but admitting Footscray would not have secured the Amateur Sports Ground. The League investigated other means of securing the venue without having to admit Public Service, including having Richmond leave the nearby Punt Road Oval to use it as a home venue, having Geelong play all of its away matches at the venue, or scheduling each club to play one or more of its home games at the neutral venue – similar to the way that VFL Park was later used in the 1970s and 1980s.

There were two other significant problems with admitting Footscray – or indeed any other club from the VFA:

- Firstly, in 1915 the VFL had introduced district-based recruiting; and Essendon and South Melbourne, the two clubs set to lose parts of their district to Footscray, would have opposed any change. The Public Service team did not have this issue, as its recruitment would have been profession-based, not district-based.
- Secondly, since 1923 there had been a five-year agreement in place between the VFA and VFL in which the two bodies were required to recognise the validity of the other's transfer clearances; ergo a player could not transfer from a VFA club to a VFL club without the VFA's permission. The VFA would almost certainly have refused to grant clearances for the entire Footscray playing list to transfer to the VFL, and the agreement gave the VFA legal recourse to seek an injunction against the move. The newly established Public Service team would not have had this issue. The implications of this transfer agreement were discussed so frequently during the off-season that it became simply known as the agreement.

After having waited many months without response since first applying to the VFL in July 1924, the Public Service withdrew its application on 3 November and submitted an application to join the VFA; and in December, the VFA provisionally accepted the application. However, Melbourne Carnivals withdrew its offer to the Public Service to use the Amateur Sports Ground (now known as the Motordrome, with a motorcycling arena having been installed in November) in the meantime. Public Service was unable to secure a replacement, so withdrew from the VFA without playing a game.

=== Breaking the agreement ===
With the Public Service club no longer available, and 'the agreement' all but preventing the VFL from admitting a VFA club, it looked likely that the VFL would remain at nine teams. But, in December 1924, the VFA admitted the Coburg Football Club, from the VFL seconds competition, into its senior ranks. The VFL contended that 'the agreement' was valid specifically between the two bodies as they were constituted at the time it was signed; and that by admitting a new club, the constitution of the VFA had changed and the agreement was voided. This gave the VFL the opportunity to admit VFA clubs. The VFA considered its legal position, but decided not to proceed, the result being that both competitions considered the agreement broken.

=== Admission of new VFL clubs ===
With 'the agreement' no longer an impediment, the VFL set about admitting a tenth club. Footscray and North Melbourne were both discussed, but both were rejected by the clubs set to lose sections of their recruiting districts. It was then proposed to admit three clubs instead of one; the VFL delegates agreed, and Footscray, Hawthorn and North Melbourne were admitted. This league saw two specific benefits with this scheme:

- Firstly, the loss of recruiting districts would be spread more evenly across the existing clubs.
- Secondly, now that 'the agreement' was broken, the VFA clubs would be free to spend as much money as was required to entice high quality VFL players into the VFA, the cessation of which had been the motivation for the VFL to sign the agreement in the first place; but, by admitting three of the VFA's strongest clubs, it would so significantly strengthen the position of the VFL compared to the VFA that it would reduce the VFA's bargaining power.

One impediment to admitting North Melbourne was that the State Government had prevented the VFL from moving into the Arden Street Oval in 1921, after protest from the VFA that it would lose its most central venue. The VFL wrote to the Minister for Lands and obtained the necessary permission from the minister to use the venue before it was able to admit North Melbourne. It is thought that Prahran would have been the twelfth team, had this permission not been obtained.

Through all of this, the VFL failed to secure use of the Motordrome, and the VFA began using it for finals matches, but it never became one of its regularly used venues. It never was expanded to become the 100,000 capacity, strategically critical, centrally located venue once imagined.

=== Format ===
In 1925, the VFL competition consisted of twelve teams of 18 on-the-field players each, with no "reserves", although any of the 18 players who had left the playing field for any reason could later resume their place on the field at any time during the match. Teams played each other in a home-and-away season of 17 rounds; matches 12 to 17 were the "home-and-away reverse" of matches 1 to 6. Once the 17 round home-and-away season had finished, the 1925 VFL Premiers were determined by the specific format and conventions of the amended "Argus system".

== Home-and-away season ==
=== Round 1 ===
| Home team | Home team score | Away team | Away team score | Venue | Crowd | Date |
|---|---|---|---|---|---|---|
| Melbourne | 9.19 (73) | St Kilda | 3.8 (26) | MCG | 15,267 | 2 May 1925 |
| Hawthorn | 5.8 (38) | Richmond | 11.11 (77) | Glenferrie Oval | 20,000 | 2 May 1925 |
| Geelong | 8.11 (59) | North Melbourne | 9.13 (67) | Corio Oval | 12,500 | 2 May 1925 |
| Fitzroy | 8.15 (63) | Footscray | 8.6 (54) | Brunswick Street Oval | 28,000 | 2 May 1925 |
| Essendon | 14.14 (98) | Collingwood | 10.13 (73) | Windy Hill | 22,000 | 2 May 1925 |
| South Melbourne | 9.14 (68) | Carlton | 4.6 (30) | Lake Oval | 25,000 | 2 May 1925 |

=== Round 2 ===
| Home team | Home team score | Away team | Away team score | Venue | Crowd | Date |
|---|---|---|---|---|---|---|
| Footscray | 10.10 (70) | South Melbourne | 8.12 (60) | Western Oval | 25,000 | 9 May 1925 |
| Collingwood | 10.11 (71) | Melbourne | 7.12 (54) | Victoria Park | 15,000 | 9 May 1925 |
| Carlton | 7.14 (56) | Essendon | 14.17 (101) | Princes Park | 25,000 | 9 May 1925 |
| St Kilda | 17.12 (114) | Hawthorn | 8.12 (60) | Junction Oval | 12,000 | 9 May 1925 |
| Richmond | 9.5 (59) | Geelong | 13.14 (92) | Punt Road Oval | 20,000 | 9 May 1925 |
| North Melbourne | 6.3 (39) | Fitzroy | 8.16 (64) | Arden Street Oval | 18,000 | 9 May 1925 |

=== Round 3 ===
| Home team | Home team score | Away team | Away team score | Venue | Crowd | Date |
|---|---|---|---|---|---|---|
| Geelong | 9.8 (62) | St Kilda | 3.12 (30) | Corio Oval | 12,500 | 16 May 1925 |
| Fitzroy | 17.11 (113) | Richmond | 8.11 (59) | Brunswick Street Oval | 20,000 | 16 May 1925 |
| Essendon | 16.15 (111) | Footscray | 9.9 (63) | Windy Hill | 32,000 | 16 May 1925 |
| South Melbourne | 12.10 (82) | North Melbourne | 8.13 (61) | Lake Oval | 17,000 | 16 May 1925 |
| Hawthorn | 9.11 (65) | Collingwood | 11.16 (82) | Glenferrie Oval | 13,000 | 16 May 1925 |
| Melbourne | 12.12 (84) | Carlton | 4.14 (38) | MCG | 16,570 | 16 May 1925 |

=== Round 4 ===
| Home team | Home team score | Away team | Away team score | Venue | Crowd | Date |
|---|---|---|---|---|---|---|
| Richmond | 11.9 (75) | South Melbourne | 10.10 (70) | Punt Road Oval | 22,000 | 23 May 1925 |
| Footscray | 6.6 (42) | Melbourne | 9.16 (70) | Western Oval | 12,000 | 23 May 1925 |
| Collingwood | 13.9 (87) | Geelong | 13.12 (90) | Victoria Park | 16,000 | 23 May 1925 |
| Carlton | 10.10 (70) | Hawthorn | 6.13 (49) | Princes Park | 10,000 | 23 May 1925 |
| St Kilda | 5.8 (38) | Fitzroy | 12.12 (84) | Junction Oval | 17,000 | 23 May 1925 |
| North Melbourne | 5.17 (47) | Essendon | 13.10 (88) | Arden Street Oval | 15,000 | 23 May 1925 |

=== Round 5 ===
| Home team | Home team score | Away team | Away team score | Venue | Crowd | Date |
|---|---|---|---|---|---|---|
| Melbourne | 12.13 (85) | North Melbourne | 10.5 (65) | MCG | 11,954 | 30 May 1925 |
| Essendon | 10.7 (67) | Richmond | 8.13 (61) | Windy Hill | 20,000 | 30 May 1925 |
| South Melbourne | 16.9 (105) | St Kilda | 10.13 (73) | Lake Oval | 18,000 | 30 May 1925 |
| Hawthorn | 10.14 (74) | Footscray | 8.10 (58) | Glenferrie Oval | 10,000 | 30 May 1925 |
| Fitzroy | 6.11 (47) | Collingwood | 7.10 (52) | Brunswick Street Oval | 25,000 | 30 May 1925 |
| Geelong | 22.12 (144) | Carlton | 10.12 (72) | Corio Oval | 12,500 | 30 May 1925 |

=== Round 6 ===
| Home team | Home team score | Away team | Away team score | Venue | Crowd | Date |
|---|---|---|---|---|---|---|
| Footscray | 9.8 (62) | Geelong | 12.11 (83) | Western Oval | 14,000 | 6 June 1925 |
| Richmond | 9.16 (70) | Melbourne | 10.10 (70) | Punt Road Oval | 38,000 | 6 June 1925 |
| North Melbourne | 8.13 (61) | Hawthorn | 8.9 (57) | Arden Street Oval | 7,000 | 6 June 1925 |
| Collingwood | 13.14 (92) | South Melbourne | 7.11 (53) | Victoria Park | 26,000 | 8 June 1925 |
| Carlton | 9.7 (61) | Fitzroy | 11.13 (79) | Princes Park | 30,000 | 8 June 1925 |
| St Kilda | 13.14 (92) | Essendon | 8.12 (60) | Junction Oval | 30,000 | 8 June 1925 |

=== Round 7 ===
| Home team | Home team score | Away team | Away team score | Venue | Crowd | Date |
|---|---|---|---|---|---|---|
| Geelong | 15.11 (101) | Hawthorn | 7.7 (49) | Corio Oval | 11,000 | 13 June 1925 |
| Footscray | 7.12 (54) | North Melbourne | 11.12 (78) | Western Oval | 15,000 | 13 June 1925 |
| Essendon | 9.11 (65) | South Melbourne | 8.9 (57) | Windy Hill | 18,000 | 13 June 1925 |
| Carlton | 9.12 (66) | Richmond | 5.13 (43) | Princes Park | 25,000 | 13 June 1925 |
| Melbourne | 12.11 (83) | Fitzroy | 6.9 (45) | MCG | 23,601 | 13 June 1925 |
| St Kilda | 11.10 (76) | Collingwood | 5.10 (40) | Junction Oval | 24,500 | 13 June 1925 |

=== Round 8 ===
| Home team | Home team score | Away team | Away team score | Venue | Crowd | Date |
|---|---|---|---|---|---|---|
| North Melbourne | 9.9 (63) | St Kilda | 10.8 (68) | Arden Street Oval | 15,000 | 20 June 1925 |
| Fitzroy | 7.15 (57) | Geelong | 9.15 (69) | Brunswick Street Oval | 25,000 | 20 June 1925 |
| South Melbourne | 7.12 (54) | Melbourne | 14.16 (100) | Lake Oval | 16,000 | 20 June 1925 |
| Richmond | 9.21 (75) | Footscray | 12.9 (81) | Punt Road Oval | 12,000 | 20 June 1925 |
| Hawthorn | 9.7 (61) | Essendon | 10.14 (74) | Glenferrie Oval | 10,000 | 20 June 1925 |
| Collingwood | 11.12 (78) | Carlton | 9.10 (64) | Victoria Park | 17,000 | 20 June 1925 |

=== Round 9 ===
| Home team | Home team score | Away team | Away team score | Venue | Crowd | Date |
|---|---|---|---|---|---|---|
| Geelong | 15.9 (99) | Melbourne | 10.15 (75) | Corio Oval | 19,500 | 27 June 1925 |
| Essendon | 9.7 (61) | Fitzroy | 8.9 (57) | Windy Hill | 22,000 | 27 June 1925 |
| Collingwood | 11.14 (80) | Richmond | 8.12 (60) | Victoria Park | 15,000 | 27 June 1925 |
| Carlton | 14.11 (95) | North Melbourne | 10.7 (67) | Princes Park | 15,000 | 27 June 1925 |
| South Melbourne | 15.14 (104) | Hawthorn | 5.7 (37) | Lake Oval | 10,000 | 27 June 1925 |
| St Kilda | 18.24 (132) | Footscray | 13.6 (84) | Junction Oval | 21,000 | 27 June 1925 |

=== Round 10 ===
| Home team | Home team score | Away team | Away team score | Venue | Crowd | Date |
|---|---|---|---|---|---|---|
| North Melbourne | 7.9 (51) | Richmond | 10.9 (69) | Arden Street Oval | 7,000 | 11 July 1925 |
| Geelong | 18.13 (121) | South Melbourne | 3.10 (28) | Corio Oval | 11,000 | 11 July 1925 |
| Fitzroy | 19.11 (125) | Hawthorn | 5.11 (41) | Brunswick Street Oval | 8,000 | 11 July 1925 |
| Melbourne | 8.7 (55) | Essendon | 5.8 (38) | MCG | 22,872 | 11 July 1925 |
| Footscray | 9.8 (62) | Collingwood | 15.16 (106) | Western Oval | 9,000 | 11 July 1925 |
| St Kilda | 8.17 (65) | Carlton | 5.10 (40) | Junction Oval | 15,000 | 11 July 1925 |

=== Round 11 ===
| Home team | Home team score | Away team | Away team score | Venue | Crowd | Date |
|---|---|---|---|---|---|---|
| Richmond | 8.14 (62) | St Kilda | 6.9 (45) | Punt Road Oval | 20,000 | 18 July 1925 |
| Hawthorn | 6.10 (46) | Melbourne | 14.18 (102) | Glenferrie Oval | 6,000 | 18 July 1925 |
| Essendon | 9.11 (65) | Geelong | 11.10 (76) | Windy Hill | 30,000 | 18 July 1925 |
| Collingwood | 16.17 (113) | North Melbourne | 11.4 (70) | Victoria Park | 9,000 | 18 July 1925 |
| Carlton | 9.12 (66) | Footscray | 7.11 (53) | Princes Park | 12,000 | 18 July 1925 |
| South Melbourne | 6.11 (47) | Fitzroy | 12.12 (84) | Lake Oval | 15,000 | 18 July 1925 |

=== Round 12 ===
| Home team | Home team score | Away team | Away team score | Venue | Crowd | Date |
|---|---|---|---|---|---|---|
| Collingwood | 15.19 (109) | Essendon | 4.5 (29) | Victoria Park | 25,000 | 1 August 1925 |
| Carlton | 9.9 (63) | South Melbourne | 9.20 (74) | Princes Park | 12,000 | 1 August 1925 |
| St Kilda | 7.9 (51) | Melbourne | 10.10 (70) | Junction Oval | 20,000 | 1 August 1925 |
| Richmond | 6.11 (47) | Hawthorn | 3.11 (29) | Punt Road Oval | 10,000 | 1 August 1925 |
| North Melbourne | 9.5 (59) | Geelong | 22.22 (154) | Arden Street Oval | 10,000 | 1 August 1925 |
| Footscray | 13.13 (91) | Fitzroy | 7.8 (50) | Western Oval | 10,000 | 1 August 1925 |

=== Round 13 ===
| Home team | Home team score | Away team | Away team score | Venue | Crowd | Date |
|---|---|---|---|---|---|---|
| Hawthorn | 8.11 (59) | St Kilda | 8.8 (56) | Glenferrie Oval | 10,000 | 8 August 1925 |
| Geelong | 11.20 (86) | Richmond | 4.8 (32) | Corio Oval | 13,500 | 8 August 1925 |
| Fitzroy | 17.18 (120) | North Melbourne | 11.8 (74) | Brunswick Street Oval | 7,000 | 8 August 1925 |
| South Melbourne | 13.14 (92) | Footscray | 12.15 (87) | Lake Oval | 15,000 | 8 August 1925 |
| Melbourne | 7.10 (52) | Collingwood | 9.11 (65) | MCG | 33,642 | 8 August 1925 |
| Essendon | 15.11 (101) | Carlton | 8.14 (62) | Windy Hill | 10,000 | 8 August 1925 |

=== Round 14 ===
| Home team | Home team score | Away team | Away team score | Venue | Crowd | Date |
|---|---|---|---|---|---|---|
| North Melbourne | 12.8 (80) | South Melbourne | 7.16 (58) | Arden Street Oval | 5,000 | 22 August 1925 |
| Collingwood | 11.18 (84) | Hawthorn | 8.12 (60) | Victoria Park | 6,000 | 22 August 1925 |
| Carlton | 6.9 (45) | Melbourne | 18.14 (122) | Princes Park | 7,000 | 22 August 1925 |
| St Kilda | 9.8 (62) | Geelong | 7.9 (51) | Junction Oval | 15,000 | 22 August 1925 |
| Richmond | 8.7 (55) | Fitzroy | 9.7 (61) | Punt Road Oval | 9,000 | 22 August 1925 |
| Footscray | 5.13 (43) | Essendon | 9.15 (69) | Western Oval | 12,000 | 22 August 1925 |

=== Round 15 ===
| Home team | Home team score | Away team | Away team score | Venue | Crowd | Date |
|---|---|---|---|---|---|---|
| Fitzroy | 11.12 (78) | St Kilda | 8.7 (55) | Brunswick Street Oval | 20,000 | 29 August 1925 |
| Essendon | 14.19 (103) | North Melbourne | 6.9 (45) | Windy Hill | 14,000 | 29 August 1925 |
| South Melbourne | 6.9 (45) | Richmond | 9.9 (63) | Lake Oval | 12,000 | 29 August 1925 |
| Melbourne | 10.9 (69) | Footscray | 9.13 (67) | MCG | 11,264 | 29 August 1925 |
| Geelong | 11.8 (74) | Collingwood | 8.17 (65) | Corio Oval | 26,025 | 29 August 1925 |
| Hawthorn | 7.10 (52) | Carlton | 11.14 (80) | Glenferrie Oval | 9,000 | 29 August 1925 |

=== Round 16 ===
| Home team | Home team score | Away team | Away team score | Venue | Crowd | Date |
|---|---|---|---|---|---|---|
| St Kilda | 11.9 (75) | South Melbourne | 9.8 (62) | Junction Oval | 10,000 | 5 September 1925 |
| Footscray | 15.10 (100) | Hawthorn | 10.10 (70) | Western Oval | 8,000 | 5 September 1925 |
| Collingwood | 12.13 (85) | Fitzroy | 14.15 (99) | Victoria Park | 27,000 | 5 September 1925 |
| Carlton | 14.10 (94) | Geelong | 15.13 (103) | Princes Park | 10,000 | 5 September 1925 |
| North Melbourne | 11.7 (73) | Melbourne | 6.10 (46) | Arden Street Oval | 5,000 | 5 September 1925 |
| Richmond | 7.8 (50) | Essendon | 10.14 (74) | Punt Road Oval | 18,000 | 5 September 1925 |

=== Round 17 ===
| Home team | Home team score | Away team | Away team score | Venue | Crowd | Date |
|---|---|---|---|---|---|---|
| Melbourne | 9.9 (63) | Richmond | 2.12 (24) | MCG | 16,989 | 12 September 1925 |
| Hawthorn | 7.13 (55) | North Melbourne | 4.6 (30) | Glenferrie Oval | 8,000 | 12 September 1925 |
| Essendon | 10.7 (67) | St Kilda | 8.10 (58) | Windy Hill | 15,000 | 12 September 1925 |
| Geelong | 14.16 (100) | Footscray | 9.7 (61) | Corio Oval | 10,800 | 12 September 1925 |
| South Melbourne | 4.6 (30) | Collingwood | 14.11 (95) | Lake Oval | 12,000 | 12 September 1925 |
| Fitzroy | 7.24 (66) | Carlton | 9.10 (64) | Brunswick Street Oval | 20,000 | 12 September 1925 |

== Ladder ==
| (P) | Premiers |
| | Qualified for finals |

| # | Team | P | W | L | D | PF | PA | % | Pts |
|---|---|---|---|---|---|---|---|---|---|
| 1 | Geelong (P) | 17 | 15 | 2 | 0 | 1564 | 1024 | 152.7 | 60 |
| 2 | Essendon | 17 | 13 | 4 | 0 | 1271 | 1065 | 119.3 | 52 |
| 3 | Melbourne | 17 | 12 | 4 | 1 | 1273 | 919 | 138.5 | 50 |
| 4 | Collingwood | 17 | 12 | 5 | 0 | 1377 | 1083 | 127.1 | 48 |
| 5 | Fitzroy | 17 | 12 | 5 | 0 | 1292 | 1028 | 125.7 | 48 |
| 6 | St Kilda | 17 | 8 | 9 | 0 | 1116 | 1120 | 99.6 | 32 |
| 7 | Richmond | 17 | 6 | 10 | 1 | 981 | 1131 | 86.7 | 26 |
| 8 | South Melbourne | 17 | 6 | 11 | 0 | 1089 | 1271 | 85.7 | 24 |
| 9 | Carlton | 17 | 5 | 12 | 0 | 1066 | 1349 | 79.0 | 20 |
| 10 | North Melbourne | 17 | 5 | 12 | 0 | 1030 | 1370 | 75.2 | 20 |
| 11 | Footscray | 17 | 4 | 13 | 0 | 1132 | 1368 | 82.7 | 16 |
| 12 | Hawthorn | 17 | 3 | 14 | 0 | 902 | 1365 | 66.1 | 12 |

Rules for classification: 1. premiership points; 2. percentage; 3. points for
Average score: 69.1
Source: AFL Tables

== Finals series ==
All of the 1925 finals were played at the MCG so the home team in the semi-finals and preliminary final is purely the higher ranked team from the ladder but in the Grand Final the home team was the team that won the preliminary final. Geelong lost to Melbourne in the semi-final, but still went on to the grand final because they were minor premiers.

=== Semi-finals ===
| Home team | Score | Away team | Score | Venue | Crowd | Date |
|---|---|---|---|---|---|---|
| Essendon | 10.8 (68) | Collingwood | 12.6 (78) | MCG | 60,055 | 19 September |
| Geelong | 13.8 (86) | Melbourne | 14.17 (101) | MCG | 51,256 | 26 September |

=== Preliminary final ===
| Home team | Score | Away team | Score | Venue | Crowd | Date |
|---|---|---|---|---|---|---|
| Melbourne | 3.8 (26) | Collingwood | 8.15 (63) | MCG | 49,833 | 3 October |

== Season notes ==
- As a consequence of the controversial situation at the end of the July 1924 match between Geelong and Fitzroy, the laws of the game were altered in 1925 so that only one defending player was allowed to stand on the mark.
- The laws of the game were altered so that the last player to touch the ball before it went out of bounds was penalised by the award of a free kick to the opposing team. This meant that almost all of the play was directed up the centre of the ground along the goal-to-goal line, and very little was directed along the flanks at the sides of the ground. This brought a considerable advantage to full-forwards.
- Geelong commenced a long-standing sponsorship with the Ford Motor Company in 1925. Still active in 2024, it is the longest active sports sponsorship of any sports team in the world, a record recognised by Guinness.
- At half-time in the spiteful Round 12 match at Arden Street between North Melbourne and Geelong, Fred Rutley of North Melbourne knocked Lloyd Hagger of Geelong to the ground with a round-arm action; Hagger's teammates, Arthur Coghlan and Stan Thomas, then remonstrated with Rutley, and the three exchanged punches, starting an all-in brawl which involved players and team officials. Coghlan was hit in the knee with a missile thrown from the crowd, while Geelong captain Cliff Rankin and teammate Sid Hall were left unconscious and having to be carried from the field on stretchers. Geelong were also threatened and pelted with missiles by angry North Melbourne fans while leaving the field at the end of the match. Six players were reported on a total of seventeen offences:
  - Fred Rutley of North Melbourne: Charged with two counts of kicking Sid Hall, striking Lloyd Hagger, striking Arthur Coghlan, striking Stan Thomas, and melee involvement. Suspended for life (Rutley was reinstated by the VFL in 1930, having served 89 matches).
  - Stan Thomas of Geelong: Charged with elbowing Bill Russ, striking Fred Rutley and melee involvement. Suspended until 31 December 1926 (26 matches).
  - Arthur Coghlan of Geelong: Charged with striking Fred Rutley and melee involvement. Suspended until 31 December 1926 (26 matches).
  - Bill Russ of North Melbourne: Charged with striking Cliff Rankin and melee involvement. Suspended until 31 December 1925 (5 matches).
  - Tim Trevaskis of North Melbourne: Charged with striking Les Smith and melee involvement. Suspended for 3 matches.
  - Harold Johnston of North Melbourne: Charged with striking Stan Thomas and melee involvement. Reprimanded.

== Awards ==
- The 1925 VFL Premiership team was Geelong.
- The VFL's leading goalkicker was Lloyd Hagger of Geelong with 78 goals.
- The winner of the 1925 Brownlow Medal Colin Watson of St Kilda, with 9 votes.
- Hawthorn on debut, took the "wooden spoon" in 1925.
- The seconds premiership was won by Collingwood District (main: 1925 VFL seconds season).

== Sources ==
- 1925 VFL season at AFL Tables
- 1925 VFL season at Australian Football
