= Davitt Coghlan =

Australian rules footballer, born 1907

Personal information
- Full name: Michael Davitt Liguri Coghlan
- Born: 28 December 1907; Coburg, Victoria
- Died: 10 October 1964 (aged 56); St Vincent's Hospital, Fitzroy, Victoria
- Height: 178 cm (5 ft 10 in)

Playing career^{1}
Years	Club	Games (Goals)
1925, 1928–30	Fitzroy	25 (10)
- ^{1} Playing statistics correct to the end of 1930.

Michael Davitt Coghlan (28 December 1907 – 10 October 1964) was an Australian rules footballer who played with Fitzroy in the Victorian Football League (VFL).

== Family ==
The son of Michael Coghlan (-1956), and Annie Coghlan (-1940), Michael Davitt Coghlan was born at Coburg, Victoria on 28 December 1907.

His brother, Arthur Emmett "Bull" Coghlan (1902-1959), played VFl football for Geelong.

He married Patricia Genevieve O'Keefe (1907-1957) in 1938.

== Military service ==
He served with the Royal Australian Air Force in the Second World War.

== Death ==
He died at St Vincent's Hospital in Fitzroy, Victoria on 10 October 1964.
