= Doug Gillespie (footballer) =

Australian rules footballer (1887–1947)

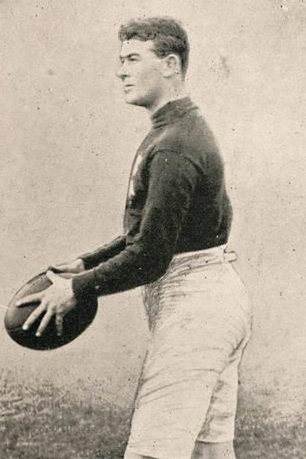
- Gillespie in 1910

Personal information
- Full name: Douglas James Gillespie
- Born: 13 December 1887; Parkville, Victoria
- Died: 6 January 1947 (aged 59); Malvern East, Victoria
- Original team: Carlton Colts
- Height: 177 cm (5 ft 10 in)
- Weight: 83 kg (183 lb)
- Position: Full-back

Playing career^{1}
Years	Club	Games (Goals)
1906–10, 1912	Carlton	90 (0)
- ^{1} Playing statistics correct to the end of 1912.

Douglas James Gillespie (13 December 1887 – 6 January 1947) was an Australian rules footballer who played for Carlton in the Victorian Football League (VFL).

== Family ==
One of the eight children (five boys and three girls) of James Gillespie (1856–1913), and Mary Gillespie (1859–1924), née Gallagher, Douglas James Gillespie was born at the Melbourne Zoo, in Royal Park, in Parkville, Victoria on 14 December 1887.

His younger twin brother, Dave Gillespie, also played for Carlton (90 games from 1906 to 1912, including the 1906 and 1907 premierships).

All five Gillespie brothers served in the First AIF: David Francis Gillespie (1887–1917), Douglas James Gillespie (1887–1947), Gordon Charles Gillespie (1890–1937), Robert Bruce Gillespie (1895–1969), and William Wallace Gillespie (1898–1967).

== Football ==
Gillespie was discovered by Jack Worrall when the Carlton coach saw him kicking the ball with some friends at Princes Park. He was used at full-back by Carlton and played in premiership teams in 1906 and 1907, his first two seasons. Gillespie missed out on being part of Carlton's third successive premiership in 1908 due to injury.

He was embroiled in controversy during the 1910 VFL season when he was implicated in a bribery scandal at Carlton. Along with Alex Lang and Doug Fraser, Gillespie was dropped for the semifinal against South Melbourne while the club and league investigated the allegations that they had been paid to play poorly. However, unlike his two teammates, Gillespie was exonerated and picked for the Grand Final. For the second year in a row he finished the premiership decider on the losing team.

The full-back spent the 1911 football season with Brunswick in the VFA before returning to Carlton the following year, where he made his tenth finals appearance before retiring. Out of Gillespie's 90 VFL matches at Carlton, he finished in the winning side 75 times.

His twin brother David Francis Gillespie (1887–1917) also played at Carlton but was killed in World War I.

Gillespie was head keeper at the Melbourne Zoo for many years, having been born there and working there for most of his life.
