= Bill Burns (footballer) =

Australian rules footballer

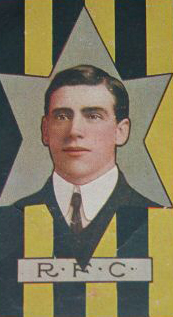

Personal information
- Full name: William Philip Burns
- Born: 19 August 1884; Ballarat, Victoria
- Died: 17 June 1955 (aged 70); Parkville, Victoria
- Original team: South Bendigo (BFL)
- Height: 180 cm (5 ft 11 in)
- Weight: 74 kg (163 lb)
- Positions: Follower, Wingman

Playing career^{1}
Years	Club	Games (Goals)
1904	Geelong	2 (0)
1908–13, 1916	Richmond	53 (10)
1914, 1917–23	East Fremantle	104 (18)
- ^{1} Playing statistics correct to the end of 1923.

William Philip Burns (19 August 1884 – 17 June 1955) was an Australian rules footballer who played for Geelong and Richmond in the Victorian Football League (VFL).

Bill 'Boots' Burns played with Ararat Football Club 1904–05, 10 games, 1904 Premiership

Burns, from South Bendigo originally, started out at Geelong and in 1908 became a member of Richmond's inaugural VFL team. A follower, he went from hero to villain during the 1909 VFL season after kicking the winning goal in one game and then getting a life ban for a kicking incident later in the year.

His goal came in Richmond's round two encounter against University, after he had received a bump which gave him bad concussion. He was in the dressing room at three quarter time, preparing to go to hospital, but decided to return to the field as the scores were close.

Against Melbourne at the MCG mid-season, Burns was reported for kicking an opponent and suspended for life by the VFL tribunal. Despite the ban, Burns had made three appearances for West Perth in the 1910 West Australian Football League season. He returned to Richmond in 1912 once his suspension had been lifted, having missed 46 games.

Once he left Richmond for good, he played at WAFL club East Fremantle and was a half forward flanker in their 1914 premiership side. He was a premiership player again in 1918 and also appeared in losing Grand Finals over the next few years, mostly as a wingman. Burns then retired, having played 104 senior games for East Fremantle. He was a Western Australian interstate representative at the 1914 Sydney Carnival.
