= Dave Gillespie (Australian footballer) =

Australian rules footballer (1887–1917)

Personal information
- Full name: David Francis Gillespie
- Born: 14 December 1887; Parkville, Victoria
- Died: 27 March 1917 (aged 29); Caulfield, Victoria
- Height: 182 cm (6 ft 0 in)
- Weight: 87 kg (192 lb)

Playing career^{1}
Years	Club	Games (Goals)
1907–08	Carlton	5 (2)
- ^{1} Playing statistics correct to the end of 1908.

David Francis Gillespie (14 December 1887 – 27 March 1917) was an Australian rules footballer who played with Carlton in the Victorian Football League (VFL) and with Brunswick in the Victorian Football Association (VFA). After being severely injured in World War I, he was repatriated to Australia and, later, died of his wounds.

== Family ==
One of the eight children (five boys and three girls) of James Gillespie (1856–1913), and Mary Gillespie (1859–1924), née Gallagher, David Francis Gillespie was born at the Melbourne Zoo, in Royal Park, in Parkville, Victoria on 14 December 1887.

His younger twin brother, Doug Gillespie, also played for Carlton (90 games from 1906 to 1912, including the 1906 and 1907 premierships).

All five Gillespie brothers served in the First AIF: David Francis Gillespie (1887–1917), Douglas James Gillespie (1887–1947), Gordon Charles Gillespie (1890–1937), Robert Bruce Gillespie (1895-1969), and William Wallace Gillespie (1898–1967).

== Football ==
=== Carlton (VFL) ===
He made his debut at the age of 19 for Carlton in the match against Fitzroy on 18 May 1907. In the next match, against South Melbourne on 25 May 1907 he broke a collar-bone, and did not play again that year.

He played three more senior matches for Carlton – in June and July 1908.

=== Brunswick (VFA) ===
On 28 April 1909 he was cleared from Carlton to Brunswick. He went on to play at least 90 games for Brunswick over seven seasons (1909-1915). He was elected vice-captain of the Brunswick team in 1915.

His second last match for Brunswick was against Port Melbourne on 22 May 1915, when he was badly injured; and, at the time, it was supposed that he would not play again in that season.

He did return, however, and played his last match (at full-back) in the VFA Grand Final against North Melbourne on 7 August 1915 – when he was brought from his Army training camp to play for Brunswick in place of ex-Coburg footballer Robert Leslie "Les" Broom (1892-1915), who had been playing at full-back in Gillespie's stead once Gillespie had enlisted in July 1915.

== Military service ==
Serving as a constable in the Victorian Police force (he joined the force in 1909), he enlisted in the First AIF on 8 July 1915, and served overseas in the 59th Australian Infantry Battalion.

He was wounded, in action, when hit in the spine by shrapnel at Armentières in France on 19 July 1916. "Reports of the time indicate that the outstanding sportsman was "unable to move" from the time he was wounded and it now [viz., 2002] seems likely that he was left a quadraplegic or, at best a paraplegic." He was repatriated to Australia on the HMAT Wiltshire. arriving at Melbourne on 31 December 1916.

== Death ==
Gillespie died of peritonitis, resulting from his wounds, at the Caulfield Convalescent Hospital on 27 March 1917, and was buried with military honours at Coburg Pine Ridge Cemetery on 29 March 1917.

THE LATE DAVE GILLESPIE
Another old footballer who has sacrificed his life for his country is Dave Gillespie, the ex-Brunswick and Carlton player.
Enlisting early he fought at Gallipoli and France, but unfortunately received a shrapnel wound in the spine about 9 months ago, from which he never recovered.
He was invalided home; but for 6 months he lay on his back unable to move; and the end came a short while ago.
His four brothers, all of whom played with the Carlton F.C. or the Carlton juniors, are at the front doing their "bit", so it will be readily conceded that the Gillespie family is doing its share towards winning the war. – The Winner, 25 April 1917.

== See also ==
- List of Victorian Football League players who died on active service
