= Tim Trevaskis =

Australian rules footballer, born 1902

Personal information
- Full name: Albert Willam Trevaskis
- Born: 23 August 1902; West Melbourne, Victoria
- Died: 2 July 1980 (aged 77); Glenroy, Victoria
- Original team: North Melbourne (VFA)
- Height: 173 cm (5 ft 8 in)
- Weight: 67 kg (148 lb)

Playing career^{1}
Years	Club	Games (Goals)
1921–24	North Melbourne (VFA)	29 (13)
1925–29	North Melbourne (VFL)	64 (26)
1930	Coburg (VFA)	11 (5)
- ^{1} Playing statistics correct to the end of 1930.

Albert William "Tim" Trevaskis (23 August 1902 – 2 July 1980) was an Australian rules footballer who played for North Melbourne in both the Victorian Football Association (VFA), and the Victorian Football League (VFL).

== Family ==
The son of George William Trevaskis (1872-1952), and Rosetta Trevaskis (1875-1946), née Jordan, Albert William Trevaskis was born on 23 August 1902.

He married Alicia Florence Cruickshank (1904-1984) in 1923.

== Football ==
=== North Melbourne (VFA) ===
Trevaskis played with North Melbourne in the Victorian Football Association (VFA) in the 1921, 1923, and 1924 seasons.

=== North Melbourne (VFL) ===
In 1925 he was a member of their inaugural VFL team and was a regular member of the team for five years, playing mostly as a rover and at half forward.

He was captain of the team in 1929.

=== Interstate VFL ===
He represented the VFL in the interstate match against New South Wales, that was played in Sydney on 8 June 1929.

=== Coburg (VFA) ===
He briefly captain-coached Coburg in 1930.

=== North Melbourne Reserves (VFL) ===
He was later in charge of North Melbourne's reserves team.
