= Archie F. Wilson =

American wood collector

Archie F. Wilson (1903–1960) was an American wood collector.

== Biography ==
Wilson was born in 1903. During the 1950s he was a Research Associate in woods at the Chicago Natural History Museum where he kept some of his collections. He also had other jobs, such as an Editor, Secretary, Vice-President and President of the International Wood Collectors Society. He died in 1960.
