= Archie Wilson (footballer, born 1890) =

Scottish footballer (1890–1916)

Personal information
- Full name: Archibald Wilson
- Date of birth: 1890
- Place of birth: Newmilns, Scotland
- Date of death: 1 July 1916 (aged 25–26)
- Place of death: near Gommecourt, France
- Height: 5 ft 7 in (1.70 m)
- Position: Outside right

Senior career*
Years	Team	Apps	(Gls)
- Newmilns
–1909	Nottingham Forest	0	(0)
1909–1911	Tottenham Hotspur	0	(0)
1911–1914	Southend United		
1914–1915	Middlesbrough	21	(8)
1915	→ Tottenham Hotspur (guest)	10	(0)
- * Club domestic league appearances and goals

Archibald Wilson (1890 – 1 July 1916) was a Scottish professional footballer who played in the Football League for Middlesbrough as an outside right. He also played in the Southern League for Southend United.

== Personal life ==
Wilson initially worked in a munitions factory during the First World War, before enlisting as a private in the London Scottish in 1915. He was killed on the first day of the Somme the following year, during the attack on the Gommecourt Salient. He is commemorated on the Thiepval Memorial.

== Career statistics ==
Appearances and goals by club, season and competition
Club	Season	League			FA Cup		Total	
Club	Season	Division	Apps	Goals	Apps	Goals	Apps	Goals
Middlesbrough	1914–15	First Division	21	8	2	0	23	8
Career total			21	8	2	0	23	8

== Honours ==
Southend United

- Southern League Second Division second-place promotion: 1912–13
