= 1902 VFA season =

1902 premiership season
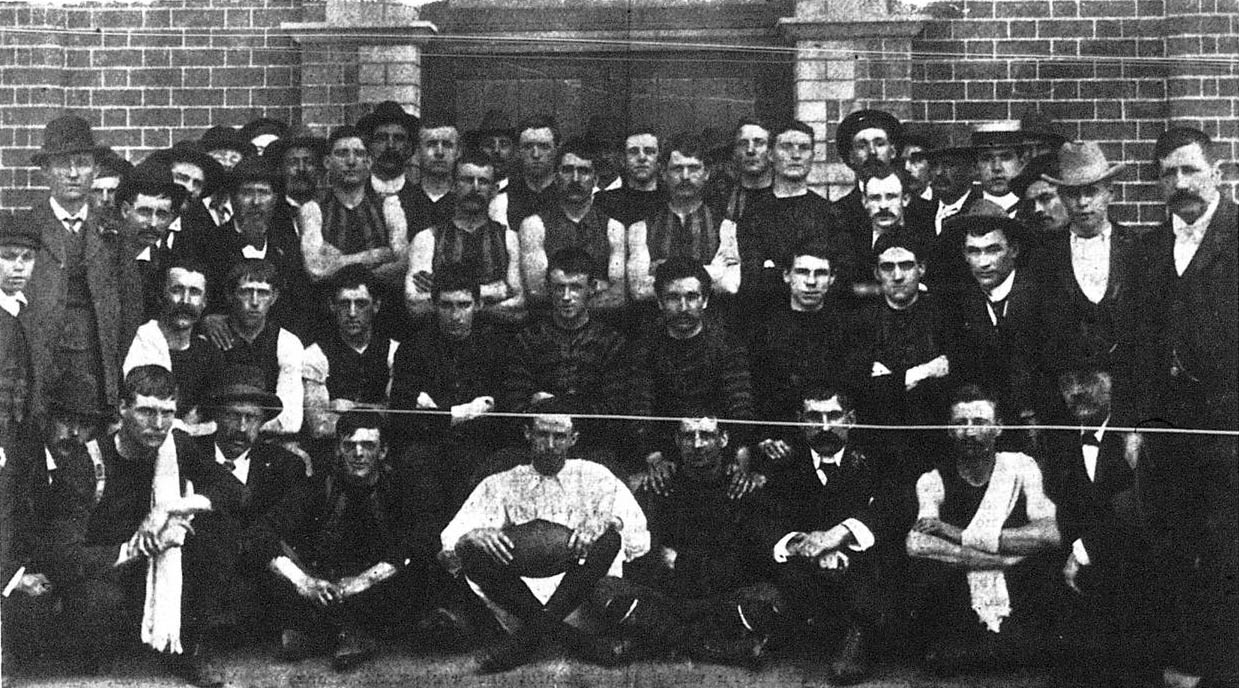
- Richmond FC, premiers
- Teams: 9
- Premiers: Richmond; 1st premiership

The 1902 Victorian Football Association season was the 26th season of the Australian rules football competition. The premiership was won by the Richmond Football Club; it was the first premiership in the club's history.

== Ladder ==
The premiership was decided on the basis of the best record across sixteen rostered matches, with each club playing the others twice; in the event of a tie for first place, a playoff match would have been held to determine the premiership.

Richmond and Port Melbourne were in a close battle for the premiership, and for the second consecutive season the clubs had equal records entering the final weekend of games, making a playoff match a likely outcome. However, in the matches on the final Saturday, Richmond 7.10 (52) defeated Prahran 3.9 (27), and Port Melbourne 3.9 (27) lost to Williamstown 7.3 (45), so the premiership was decided in Richmond's favour without a playoff match.

1902 VFA ladder
Pos	Team	Pld	W	L	D	PF	PA	Pts
1	Richmond (P)	16	15	1	0	814	346	60
2	Port Melbourne	16	14	2	0	774	456	56
3	North Melbourne	16	10	5	1	682	540	42
4	Williamstown	16	8	8	0	673	587	32
5	Footscray	16	7	9	0	672	584	28
6	Essendon Town	16	5	10	1	484	732	22
7	West Melbourne	16	5	11	0	482	704	20
8	Prahran	16	5	11	0	604	818	20
9	Brunswick	16	2	14	0	483	911	8

Rules for classification: 1) points; 2) percentage; 3) number of points for.
(P) Premiers

== Notable events ==
- On 9 August at the Port Melbourne Cricket Ground, Port Melbourne 9.23 (77) defeated Footscray 0.0 (0), the latter failing even to attempt a shot on goal in the match. As of 2024, it is the only time a club has been held scoreless in a senior Association match since the modern scoring system was adopted in 1897.
- On Thursday 4 September, a match was played between a combined Association team and a combined League team at the Melbourne Cricket Ground. The match was played for the benefit of Fred McGinis, who had played for Melbourne in both competitions but through illness had become almost blind during the year; a crowd of around 7,000 attended, and more than £200 was raised. The League 9.17 (71) defeated the Association 4.3 (27) by 44 points. It was the first time that teams representing the rival competitions had played against each other since the breakaway of the League in 1897; another would not be played until 1915.

== See also ==
- Victorian Football Association/Victorian Football League History (1877-2008)
- List of VFA/VFL Premiers (1877-2007)
