= Bert Streckfuss =

Australian rules footballer (1888–1974)

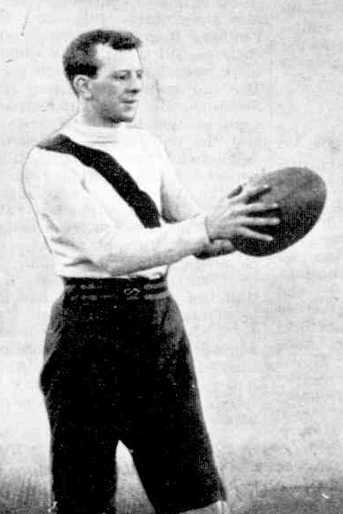
- Streckfuss in 1910

Personal information
- Full name: Albert Frederick Streckfuss
- Born: 22 September 1888; Goornong, Victoria
- Died: 23 June 1974 (aged 85); Prahran, Victoria
- Original team: Beverley

Playing career^{1}
| Years | Club | Games (Goals) |
| 1909–1910 | South Melbourne | 18 (5) |
- ^{1} Playing statistics correct to the end of 1910.

Albert Frederick Streckfuss (22 September 1888 – 23 June 1974) was an Australian rules footballer who played with South Melbourne in the Victorian Football League (VFL), and with Williamstown and Port Melbourne in the Victorian Football Association (VFA).

== Family ==
The son of Heinrich Moritz Streckfuss (1833-1917), and his second wife, Lina Streckfuss (1848-1918), née Lohse, Albert Frederick Streckfuss was born in Goornong, Victoria on 22 September 1888.

He married Lilian Victoria Chambers in 1912.

== Football ==
=== South Melbourne (VFL) ===
Recruited from the Metropolitan Junior Football Association's (MJFA) Beverley Football Club, Streckfuss made two appearances for South Melbourne in the 1909 VFL season.

He wasn't selected in South Melbourne's premiership team but was a member of the side which defeated West Adelaide to win the Championship of Australia.

In 1910 he played more regularly, making 16 appearances, two of them in the finals series.

==== 28 May 1910 ====
He was involved in a controversial incident that year in a game against Carlton, knocked unconscious by a George Topping king-hit, which resulted in a field invasion. The Carlton player was banned for 35 matches, but Streckfuss was fined (£10) as well, after it was later revealed in court that he had earlier struck Carlton's Andrew McDonald (Four weeks into the 1910 season, it had already become a matter of controversy that a number of serious offences on the football field had not been reported.)

=== Wiilamstown (VFA) ===
Cleared from South Melbourne on 10 May 1911, Streckfuss went to Williamstown in 1911.

=== Port Melbourne (VFA) ===
Cleared from Williamstown, Streckfuss played 8 senior matches and kicked 11 goals for Port Melbourne in 1915.

He played in the Port Melbourne team that lost the 1915 First Semi-Final to Brunswick 10.14 (74) to 8.8 (56) on 26 July 1915.

== Umpire ==
During the 1920s, Streckfuss served as a VFL boundary umpire. The 109 games that he umpired from 1921 to 1930 includes a stint as a VFL goal umpire in 1930. He officiated in eight finals.

== Death ==
He died on 23 June 1974.
