= 1896 WAFA season =

- Premiers: Fremantle; 9th premiership

The 1896 WAFA season was the 12th season of senior Australian rules football in Perth, Western Australia. Fremantle won their ninth premiership and fifth consecutive premiership, overtaking their previous record of four consecutive premierships. Along with East Perth, Fremantle to this day still hold the record for most consecutive premierships in the Western Australian Football League history.

== Ladder ==
1896 ladder
Pos	Team	Pld	W	L	D	GF	GA	GD	Pts
1	Fremantle (P)	17	14	2	1	123	60	+63	29
2	Imperials	17	9	8	0	91	86	+5	18
3	West Perth	16	5	10	1	799	93	+706	11
4	Rovers	16	3	11	2	70	124	−54	8

Source: WAFL Footy Facts
Rules for classification: 1) points; 2) percentage; 3) number of points for.
(P) Premiers
