= Wally Warden =

Australian rules footballer

Personal information
- Full name: Walter G. Warden
- Born: 21 April 1906
- Died: 18 September 1998 (aged 92)
- Original team: Brunswick
- Height: 184 cm (6 ft 0 in)
- Weight: 85 kg (187 lb)

Playing career^{1}
Years	Club	Games (Goals)
1928, 1930	Footscray	19 (9)
- ^{1} Playing statistics correct to the end of 1930.

Wally 'Pug' Warden (21 April 1906 – 18 September 1998) was an Australian rules footballer who played for Footscray in the Victorian Football League (VFL).

Warden, who was originally from Brunswick, holds the record for the longest suspension received by a Footscray player. The league imposed a 22-game suspension in 1928 after he was reported for 'kicking' and he subsequently missed the entire 1929 season. He later played with and coached Footscray District Football League club Kingsville.
