= Harold Johnston (footballer) =

Australian rules footballer

Personal information
- Full name: Harold F. Johnston
- Born: 1 May 1895
- Died: 3 July 1978 (aged 83)
- Height: 168 cm (5 ft 6 in)
- Weight: 65 kg (143 lb)

Playing career^{1}
Years	Club	Games (Goals)
1925–27	North Melbourne	37 (32)
- ^{1} Playing statistics correct to the end of 1927.

Harold Johnston (1 May 1895 – 3 July 1978) was an Australian rules footballer who played for North Melbourne in the Victorian Football League (VFL) during the 1920s.

Johnston was with North Melbourne from their inaugural VFL season in 1925 but as a result of them being an inexperienced club, he only experienced six wins in his 37-game career. One of those victories, against Hawthorn, was Wels Eicke's 200th and they won largely due to Johnston's career best four goal haul.

As a VFL field umpire, Johnston appeared three times in 1930 and also officiated in a further three matches on the boundary in 1931.
