= Arthur Coghlan =

Australian rules footballer (1902–1959)

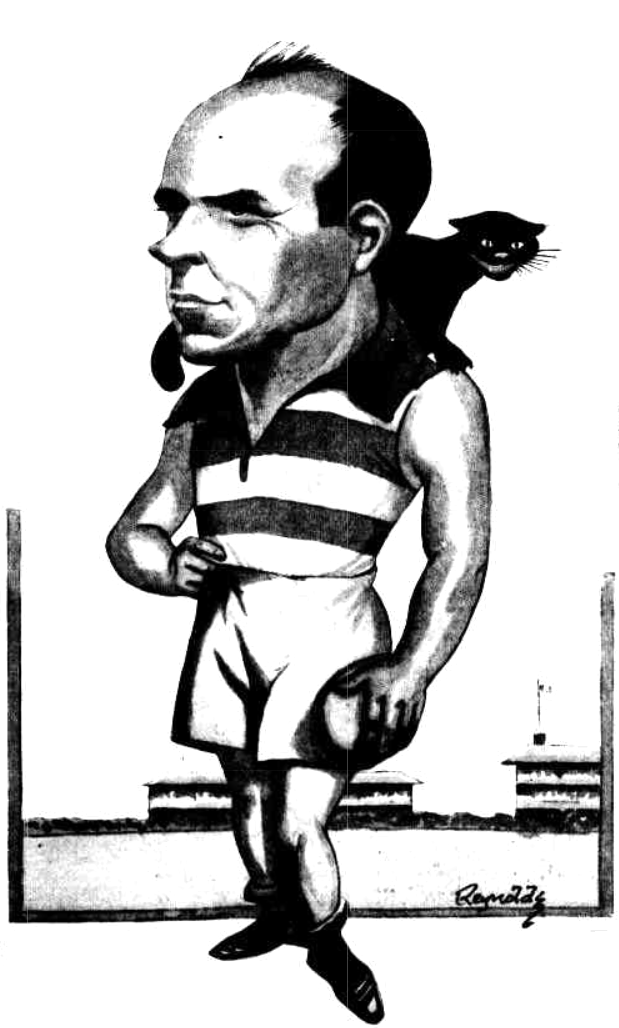
- 1930 caricature by Reynolds

Personal information
- Full name: Arthur Emmett Coghlan
- Born: 16 August 1902; Coburg, Victoria, Australia
- Died: 8 June 1959 (aged 56); Newtown, Victoria, Australia
- Original team: Toora
- Height: 180 cm (5 ft 11 in)
- Weight: 86 kg (190 lb)

Playing career^{1}
Years	Club	Games (Goals)
1922–1932	Geelong	145 (10)

Coaching career
Years	Club	Games (W–L–D)
1929–30, 1932–34	Geelong	80 (48–31–1)
- ^{1} Playing statistics correct to the end of 1934.

Arthur Emmett "Bull" Coghlan (16 August 1902 – 8 June 1959) was an Australian rules footballer, who played for and coached Geelong in the VFL.

== Family ==
His brother, Davitt Coghlan, played with Fitzroy in the VFL.

== Football ==
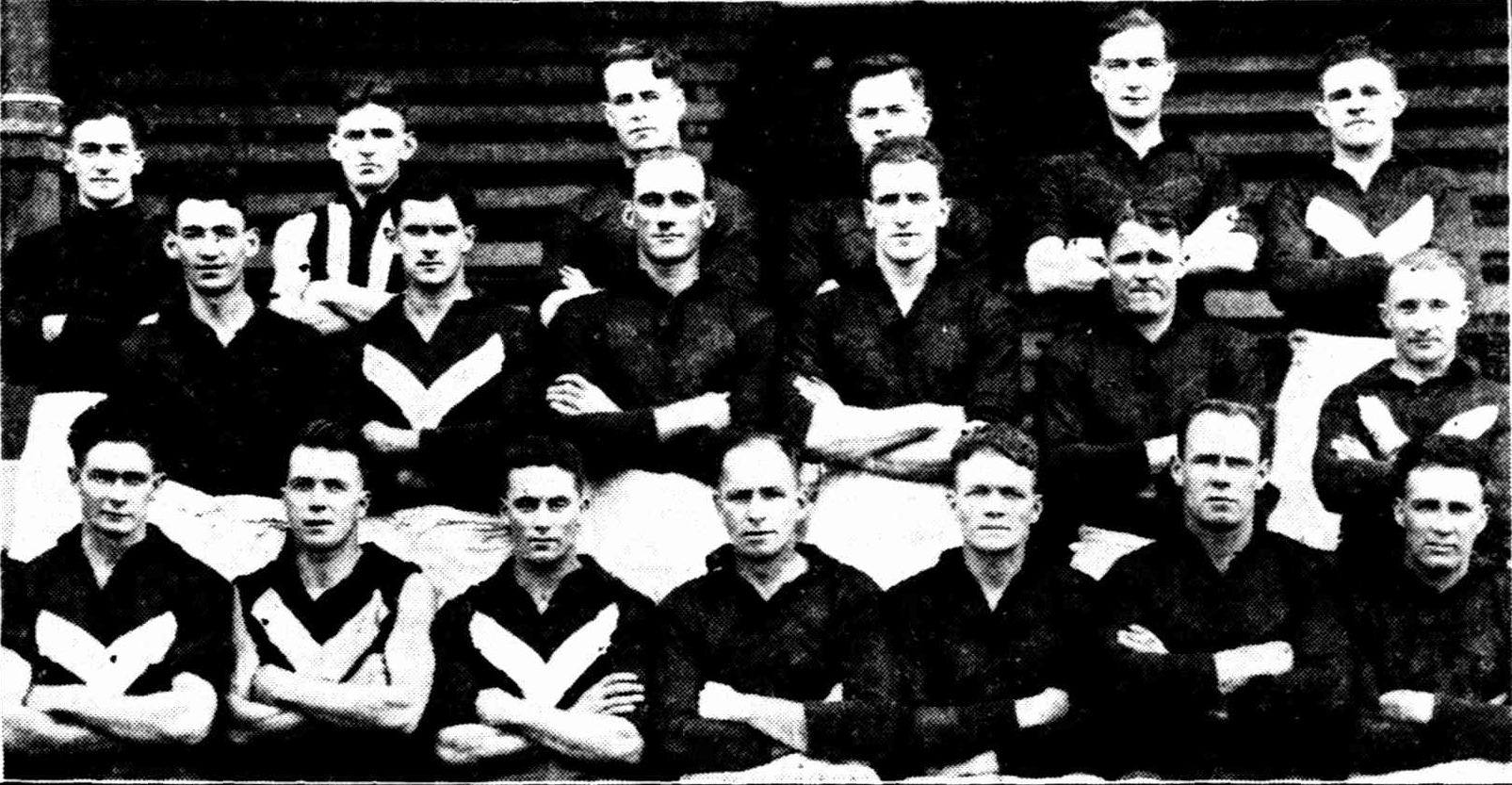
The Victorian Football League's Interstate team that drew with South Australia, in Adelaide, 13.10 (88) to 11.22 (88) on Saturday, 16 June 1928. Back Row: Jack Moriarty, Albert "Leeter" Collier, Hugh Dunbar, Gordon "Nuts" Coventry, Bob Johnson, Jack Baggott. Second Row: Jack Vosti, Charlie Stanbridge, Arthur Stevens, Alex Duncan, Dick Taylor, Ted Baker. Front Row: Basil McCormack, Arthur Rayson, Allan Geddes (vice-captain), Syd Coventry (captain), Barney Carr, Arthur “Bull” Coghlan, Herbert White.

Geelong's Toora recruit was a hard hitting ruckman but could also play in key positions.

He missed out on their 1925 premiership after being suspended for the remainder of 1925 and all of 1926 for escalating an all-in brawl that involved players and team officials. North Melbourne's Fred Rutley was suspended for life for starting the brawl.

In early 1928, Coghlan was appointed as captain-coach of Nhill Football Club, but his clearance was not approved by Geelong.

In 1929, he was appointed captain-coach and in his second season in this role steered Geelong to a Grand Final. They lost the match to Collingwood by 30 points but he played in a premiership the following season, albeit this time as neither captain nor coach.

He played his final game in 1932 and in 1933 became the non-playing coach of Geelong, making it all the way to the Preliminary Final in both of his two seasons.
