= Stan Thomas (Australian footballer) =

Australian rules footballer

Personal information
- Full name: Stanley Thomas
- Nickname: Dasher
- Born: 9 May 1892; Tasmania, Australia
- Died: 2 November 1958 (aged 66); Geelong, Victoria
- Original team: Barwon
- Debut: Round 3, 1915, Geelong vs. Melbourne, at the MCG
- Height: 180 cm (5 ft 11 in)
- Weight: 79 kg (174 lb)

Playing career^{1}
Years	Club	Games (Goals)
1915–1925	Geelong	137 (6)
- ^{1} Playing statistics correct to the end of 1925.

Stanley "Dasher" Thomas (9 May 1892 – 2 November 1958) was an Australian rules footballer who played with Geelong in the Victorian Football League (VFL).

== Family ==
The son of Sarah Jane Hull (1876-) — later, having married John Henry Thomas (1870-) in 1896, she became Sarah Jane Thomas — Thomas Stanley Hull (later known as "Stanley Thomas") was born in Tasmania on 9 May 1892.

He was married to Ethel Mary Murnane (-1982).

== Football ==
Thomas first played for Geelong in 1915. He did not play in 1916; however, from 1917 to 1925 he was a regular member of Geelong's defence.

He represented the VFL in a match against a combined Bendigo Football League team on 24 July 1920.

He only played one finals match in his career: the Semi Final against Fitzroy, at the MCG, in September 1923.

His career ended when he was given a 26-game suspension (the remainder of 1925 and all of 1926) for escalating an all-in brawl that involved players and team officials in Geelong's controversial 1 August 1925 match against North Melbourne.

== Death ==
He died in Geelong on 2 November 1958, and was buried at Geelong Eastern Cemetery.
