= Doug Fraser (Australian footballer) =

Australian rules footballer

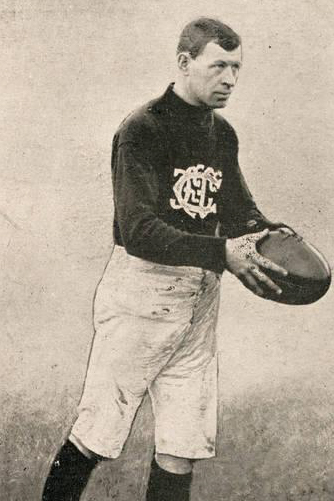
- Fraser in 1910

Personal information
- Full name: Douglas Stewart Fraser
- Born: 7 December 1886; Brunswick, Victoria
- Died: 24 February 1919 (aged 32); Yarraville, Victoria
- Original team: Yarraville
- Height: 185 cm (6 ft 1 in)
- Weight: 86 kg (190 lb)
- Position: Follower

Playing career^{1}
Years	Club	Games (Goals)
1910	Carlton	11 (6)
- ^{1} Playing statistics correct to the end of 1910.

Douglas Stewart Fraser (7 December 1886 – 24 February 1919) was an Australian rules footballer who played for Carlton in the Victorian Football League (VFL).

A Yarraville Football Club premiership player in the Victorian Football Association (VFA), Fraser broke into a strong Carlton team in the 1910 VFL season and established a place in the side as a follower. He kicked three goals in a win over Geelong at Princes Park.

Fraser is best remembered for his involvement in the bribery scandal that hit the league during the 1910 finals series. Together with Doug Gillespie and his childhood friend Alex Lang, Fraser was withdrawn from the Semi Final against South Melbourne while Carlton and the league investigated allegations that they had accepted bribes to 'play dead'. Lang and Fraser were both found guilty and suspended for five years, a total of 99 league games.

He died in 1919 from influenza, having never played senior football again.

== Sources ==
- Atkinson, G. (1982) Everything you ever wanted to know about Australian rules football but couldn't be bothered asking, The Five Mile Press: Melbourne. ISBN 0 86788 009 0.
- Doug Fraser's playing statistics from AFL Tables
- Doug Fraser at AustralianFootball.com
- Holmesby, Russell and Main, Jim (2007). The Encyclopedia of AFL Footballers. 7th ed. Melbourne: Bas Publishing.
- Profile on Blueseum.org
- Doug Fraser's WAFL playing statistics at WAFLFootyFacts.net
