= Alex Lang =

Australian rules footballer

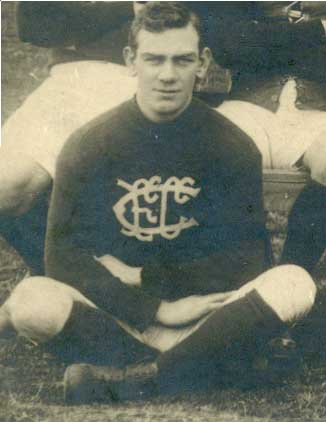

Personal information
- Full name: William Alexander Lang
- Nickname: Bongo
- Born: 12 March 1888; Carlton, Victoria
- Died: 9 July 1943 (aged 55); Adelaide, South Australia
- Original team: Parkville Presbyterians
- Debut: Round 1, 1906, Carlton vs. Melbourne, at Princes Park
- Height: 175 cm (5 ft 9 in)
- Weight: 73 kg (161 lb)

Playing career^{1}
Years	Club	Games (Goals)
1906–10, 1916–17	Carlton	105 (82)
- ^{1} Playing statistics correct to the end of 1917.

Career highlights
- Carlton premiership player: 1906, 1907 & 1908

William Alexander Lang (12 March 1888 – 9 July 1943) was an Australian rules footballer who played with the Carlton Football Club in the Victorian Football League (VFL). A three-time premiership player, Lang is best remembered as the joint record-holder for the longest player ban received from the tribunal.

== Football career ==
Recruited by coach Jack Worrall in 1905, Lang debuted for Carlton in the opening round of the following season. He played as a rover, winning premierships in his first three years at the club and in 1909 was voted by The Australasian newspaper as the most 'Outstanding player in the VFL'.

During the 1910 final series, Lang became involved in a match-fixing scandal after being dropped from the side for the second semi-final against South Melbourne. It had been alleged that he had accepted a bribe to play poorly, along with teammates Doug Gillespie and Doug Fraser. Both Carlton and the VFL launched their own investigations, and Lang admitted that an offer had been made to him. He claimed, however, that he did not intend on accepting it. Regardless of his plea of innocence, he was found guilty along with Fraser, and both were banned for 99 games, a total of five years. Gillespie was exonerated and played in the club's losing grand final.

Lang returned to the game in 1916 and brought up his 100th game for Carlton. He retired the following season after playing only three games.

== In popular culture ==
The story of Lang's fall from grace is recounted in the 2020 book On the Take by Tony Joel and Mathew Turner.
