= Bill Russ =

Australian rules footballer

Personal information
- Full name: William Wallace Russ
- Born: 6 July 1899; Ballarat East, Victoria
- Died: 13 August 1977 (aged 78); Heidelberg, Victoria
- Original team: Footscray (VFA)
- Height: 171 cm (5 ft 7 in)
- Weight: 62 kg (137 lb)

Playing career^{1}
| Years | Club | Games (Goals) |
| 1925–1928 | North Melbourne | 59 (16) |
| 1929–1930 | Footscray | 36 (19) |
| Total | | 95 (35) |
- ^{1} Playing statistics correct to the end of 1930.

Career highlights
- McCarthy trophy: 1929

William Wallace Russ (6 July 1899 – 13 August 1977) was an Australian rules footballer who played with North Melbourne and Footscray in the Victorian Football League (VFL).

A centreman, Russ was a member of North Melbourne's inaugural VFL side in 1925. In 1929 he crossed to Footscray and was their season's best and fairest winner.

== See also ==
- 1927 Melbourne Carnival
