= 1910 VFL season =

14th season of the Victorian Football League (VFL)

1910 VFL premiership season
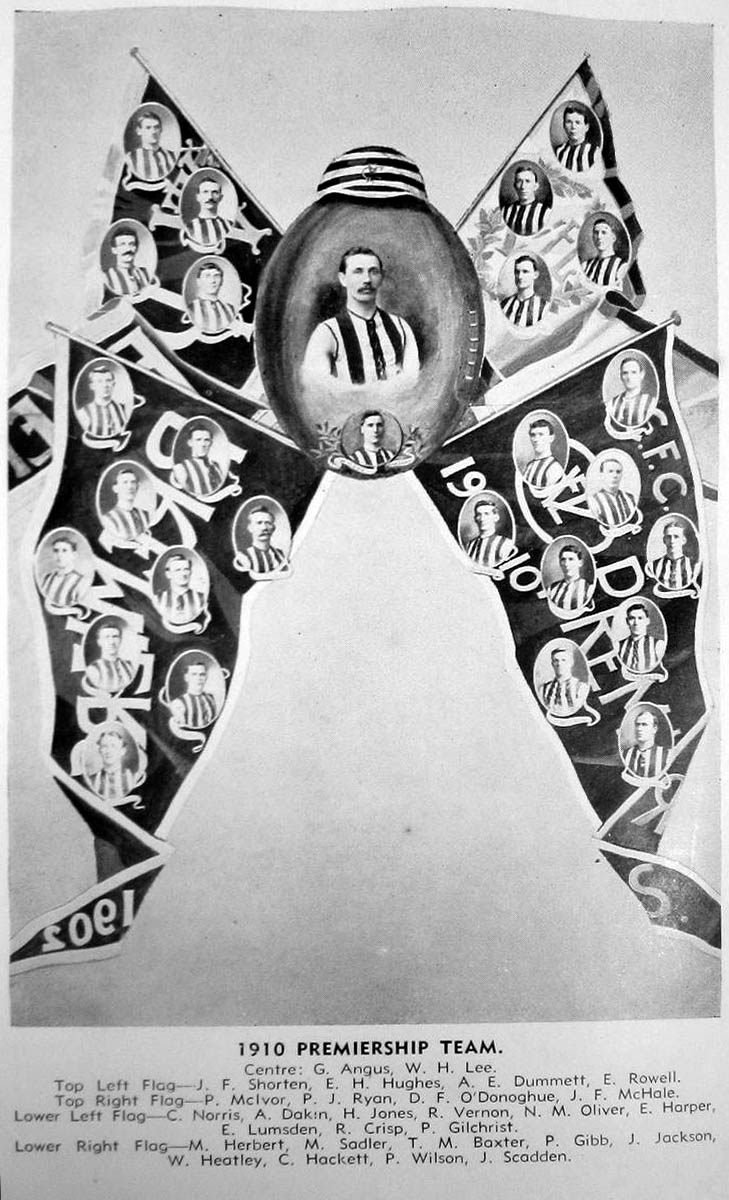
- Collingwood 1910 VFL premiership team
- Date: 30 April – 1 October 1910
- Teams: 10
- Premiers: Collingwood; 3rd premiership
- Minor premiers: Carlton; 4th minor premiership
- Leading goalkicker medallist: Percy Martini (Geelong); 51 goals
- Matches played: 94

The 1910 VFL season was the 14th season of the Victorian Football League (VFL), the highest-level senior Australian rules football competition in Victoria. The season featured ten clubs and ran from 30 April to 1 October, comprising an 18-match home-and-away season followed by a four-week finals series featuring the top four clubs.

Collingwood won the premiership, defeating Carlton by 14 points in the 1910 VFL grand final; it was Collingwood's third VFL premiership. Carlton won the minor premiership by finishing atop the home-and-away ladder with a 15–3 win–loss record. Geelong's Percy Martini won the leading goalkicker medal as the league's leading goalkicker.

== Background ==
In 1910, the VFL competition comprised ten teams of 18 on-the-field players each, with no "reserves", although any of the 18 players who had left the playing field for any reason could later resume their place on the field at any time during the match.

Each team played each other twice in a home-and-away season of 18 rounds.

Once the 18 round home-and-away season had finished, the 1910 VFL Premiers were determined by the specific format and conventions of the amended "Argus system".

== Home-and-away season ==
=== Round 1 ===
Home team	Home team score	Away team	Away team score	Venue	Date
St Kilda	3.12 (30)	University	7.10 (52)	Junction Oval	30 April 1910
Essendon	3.18 (36)	Fitzroy	9.10 (64)	EMCG	30 April 1910
Carlton	9.9 (63)	Collingwood	5.5 (35)	Princes Park	30 April 1910
South Melbourne	11.12 (78)	Richmond	4.8 (32)	Lake Oval	30 April 1910
Melbourne	6.6 (42)	Geelong	13.21 (99)	MCG	30 April 1910

=== Round 2 ===
Home team	Home team score	Away team	Away team score	Venue	Date
Fitzroy	14.15 (99)	St Kilda	4.12 (36)	Brunswick Street Oval	14 May 1910
Collingwood	13.9 (87)	South Melbourne	5.16 (46)	Victoria Park	14 May 1910
Richmond	16.18 (114)	Melbourne	5.7 (37)	Punt Road Oval	14 May 1910
University	8.10 (58)	Essendon	15.17 (107)	EMCG	14 May 1910
Geelong	6.9 (45)	Carlton	10.15 (75)	Corio Oval	14 May 1910

=== Round 3 ===
Home team	Home team score	Away team	Away team score	Venue	Date
Fitzroy	7.11 (53)	Geelong	9.13 (67)	Brunswick Street Oval	21 May 1910
Collingwood	13.13 (91)	St Kilda	2.6 (18)	Victoria Park	21 May 1910
University	10.13 (73)	Richmond	7.10 (52)	EMCG	21 May 1910
South Melbourne	10.7 (67)	Essendon	11.7 (73)	Lake Oval	21 May 1910
Melbourne	5.6 (36)	Carlton	9.15 (69)	MCG	21 May 1910

=== Round 4 ===
Home team	Home team score	Away team	Away team score	Venue	Date
Geelong	6.9 (45)	University	9.4 (58)	Corio Oval	28 May 1910
Carlton	6.13 (49)	South Melbourne	4.8 (32)	Princes Park	28 May 1910
St Kilda	7.9 (51)	Melbourne	8.6 (54)	Junction Oval	28 May 1910
Richmond	7.19 (61)	Fitzroy	4.8 (32)	Punt Road Oval	28 May 1910
Essendon	6.7 (43)	Collingwood	4.17 (41)	EMCG	28 May 1910

=== Round 5 ===
Home team	Home team score	Away team	Away team score	Venue	Date
South Melbourne	6.14 (50)	University	7.6 (48)	Lake Oval	4 June 1910
Geelong	5.16 (46)	Richmond	4.5 (29)	Corio Oval	4 June 1910
Essendon	8.15 (63)	St Kilda	7.9 (51)	EMCG	4 June 1910
Collingwood	10.16 (76)	Melbourne	4.4 (28)	Victoria Park	4 June 1910
Fitzroy	9.9 (63)	Carlton	14.20 (104)	Brunswick Street Oval	4 June 1910

=== Round 6 ===
Home team	Home team score	Away team	Away team score	Venue	Date
Geelong	11.12 (78)	South Melbourne	6.6 (42)	Corio Oval	6 June 1910
St Kilda	7.7 (49)	Richmond	8.14 (62)	Junction Oval	6 June 1910
Melbourne	10.7 (67)	Essendon	16.21 (117)	MCG	6 June 1910
Fitzroy	7.9 (51)	Collingwood	11.14 (80)	Brunswick Street Oval	6 June 1910
University	5.5 (35)	Carlton	11.8 (74)	EMCG	6 June 1910

=== Round 7 ===
Home team	Home team score	Away team	Away team score	Venue	Date
Carlton	6.15 (51)	Essendon	7.10 (52)	Princes Park	11 June 1910
South Melbourne	11.15 (81)	Melbourne	6.10 (46)	Lake Oval	11 June 1910
St Kilda	9.6 (60)	Geelong	10.14 (74)	Junction Oval	11 June 1910
University	13.14 (92)	Fitzroy	8.8 (56)	EMCG	11 June 1910
Richmond	5.7 (37)	Collingwood	6.9 (45)	Punt Road Oval	11 June 1910

=== Round 8 ===
Home team	Home team score	Away team	Away team score	Venue	Date
St Kilda	4.5 (29)	South Melbourne	6.13 (49)	Junction Oval	18 June 1910
Essendon	5.12 (42)	Geelong	2.9 (21)	EMCG	18 June 1910
Collingwood	6.10 (46)	University	6.6 (42)	Victoria Park	18 June 1910
Melbourne	6.14 (50)	Fitzroy	8.18 (66)	MCG	18 June 1910
Richmond	7.6 (48)	Carlton	7.15 (57)	Punt Road Oval	18 June 1910

=== Round 9 ===
Home team	Home team score	Away team	Away team score	Venue	Date
Fitzroy	7.13 (55)	South Melbourne	11.6 (72)	Brunswick Street Oval	25 June 1910
Carlton	9.10 (64)	St Kilda	4.7 (31)	Princes Park	25 June 1910
University	7.7 (49)	Melbourne	4.11 (35)	EMCG	25 June 1910
Richmond	6.10 (46)	Essendon	9.14 (68)	Punt Road Oval	25 June 1910
Geelong	10.9 (69)	Collingwood	6.11 (47)	Corio Oval	25 June 1910

=== Round 10 ===
Home team	Home team score	Away team	Away team score	Venue	Date
Richmond	10.7 (67)	South Melbourne	10.11 (71)	Punt Road Oval	2 July 1910
Geelong	15.10 (100)	Melbourne	8.3 (51)	Corio Oval	2 July 1910
University	7.12 (54)	St Kilda	6.9 (45)	EMCG	2 July 1910
Fitzroy	11.5 (71)	Essendon	12.17 (89)	Brunswick Street Oval	2 July 1910
Collingwood	2.10 (22)	Carlton	6.15 (51)	Victoria Park	2 July 1910

=== Round 11 ===
Home team	Home team score	Away team	Away team score	Venue	Date
Melbourne	4.10 (34)	Richmond	12.15 (87)	MCG	9 July 1910
Essendon	8.9 (57)	University	11.9 (75)	EMCG	9 July 1910
Carlton	16.11 (107)	Geelong	3.15 (33)	Princes Park	9 July 1910
St Kilda	4.10 (34)	Fitzroy	8.14 (62)	Junction Oval	9 July 1910
South Melbourne	13.17 (95)	Collingwood	4.9 (33)	Lake Oval	9 July 1910

=== Round 12 ===
Home team	Home team score	Away team	Away team score	Venue	Date
Richmond	5.11 (41)	University	10.7 (67)	Punt Road Oval	16 July 1910
Essendon	6.9 (45)	South Melbourne	5.4 (34)	EMCG	16 July 1910
Carlton	13.22 (100)	Melbourne	4.11 (35)	Princes Park	16 July 1910
Geelong	11.6 (72)	Fitzroy	4.9 (33)	Corio Oval	16 July 1910
St Kilda	6.8 (44)	Collingwood	7.12 (54)	Junction Oval	16 July 1910

=== Round 13 ===
Home team	Home team score	Away team	Away team score	Venue	Date
Melbourne	6.12 (48)	St Kilda	4.11 (35)	MCG	23 July 1910
Fitzroy	3.7 (25)	Richmond	5.5 (35)	Brunswick Street Oval	23 July 1910
Collingwood	5.13 (43)	Essendon	2.9 (21)	Victoria Park	23 July 1910
University	8.13 (61)	Geelong	5.8 (38)	EMCG	23 July 1910
South Melbourne	4.7 (31)	Carlton	6.8 (44)	Lake Oval	23 July 1910

=== Round 14 ===
Home team	Home team score	Away team	Away team score	Venue	Date
Carlton	5.13 (43)	Fitzroy	4.16 (40)	Princes Park	30 July 1910
University	3.6 (24)	South Melbourne	10.7 (67)	EMCG	30 July 1910
Richmond	5.12 (42)	Geelong	6.6 (42)	Punt Road Oval	30 July 1910
St Kilda	5.8 (38)	Essendon	11.11 (77)	Junction Oval	30 July 1910
Melbourne	7.6 (48)	Collingwood	9.12 (66)	MCG	30 July 1910

=== Round 15 ===
Home team	Home team score	Away team	Away team score	Venue	Date
Richmond	8.6 (54)	St Kilda	1.10 (16)	Punt Road Oval	6 August 1910
Collingwood	7.12 (54)	Fitzroy	6.6 (42)	Victoria Park	6 August 1910
South Melbourne	11.12 (78)	Geelong	3.8 (26)	Lake Oval	6 August 1910
Essendon	4.18 (42)	Melbourne	7.12 (54)	EMCG	13 August 1910
Carlton	11.12 (78)	University	6.14 (50)	Princes Park	13 August 1910

=== Round 16 ===
Home team	Home team score	Away team	Away team score	Venue	Date
Melbourne	8.6 (54)	South Melbourne	8.10 (58)	MCG	20 August 1910
Geelong	7.11 (53)	St Kilda	3.6 (24)	Corio Oval	20 August 1910
Fitzroy	3.5 (23)	University	7.6 (48)	Brunswick Street Oval	20 August 1910
Collingwood	8.13 (61)	Richmond	5.4 (34)	Victoria Park	20 August 1910
Essendon	8.12 (60)	Carlton	7.10 (52)	EMCG	20 August 1910

=== Round 17 ===
Home team	Home team score	Away team	Away team score	Venue	Date
Fitzroy	12.16 (88)	Melbourne	2.11 (23)	Brunswick Street Oval	27 August 1910
Carlton	9.8 (62)	Richmond	6.9 (45)	Princes Park	27 August 1910
South Melbourne	11.11 (77)	St Kilda	10.5 (65)	Lake Oval	27 August 1910
Geelong	10.19 (79)	Essendon	10.11 (71)	Corio Oval	27 August 1910
University	9.5 (59)	Collingwood	10.15 (75)	EMCG	27 August 1910

=== Round 18 ===
Home team	Home team score	Away team	Away team score	Venue	Date
Melbourne	9.6 (60)	University	7.7 (49)	MCG	3 September 1910
Essendon	6.14 (50)	Richmond	7.9 (51)	EMCG	3 September 1910
Collingwood	4.13 (37)	Geelong	2.9 (21)	Victoria Park	3 September 1910
South Melbourne	7.10 (52)	Fitzroy	4.5 (29)	Lake Oval	3 September 1910
St Kilda	5.6 (36)	Carlton	2.12 (24)	Junction Oval	3 September 1910

== Ladder ==
(P)	Premiers
	Qualified for finals

#	Team	P	W	L	D	PF	PA	%	Pts
1	Carlton	18	15	3	0	1167	729	160.1	60
2	Collingwood (P)	18	13	5	0	993	812	122.3	52
3	South Melbourne	18	12	6	0	1080	884	122.2	48
4	Essendon	18	12	6	0	1113	963	115.6	48
5	Geelong	18	10	7	1	1008	952	105.9	42
6	University	18	10	8	0	994	979	101.5	40
7	Richmond	18	7	10	1	937	913	102.6	30
8	Fitzroy	18	5	13	0	952	1048	90.8	20
9	Melbourne	18	4	14	0	802	1347	59.5	16
10	St Kilda	18	1	17	0	692	1111	62.3	4

Rules for classification: 1. premiership points; 2. percentage; 3. points for
Average score: 54.1
Source: AFL Tables

== Finals series ==
All of the 1910 finals were played at the MCG so the home team in the semi-finals and Preliminary Final is purely the higher ranked team from the ladder but in the Grand Final the home team was the team that won the Preliminary Final.

=== Semi-finals ===
Home team	Score	Away team	Score	Venue	Date
Collingwood	14.11 (95)	Essendon	5.7 (37)	MCG	10 September
Carlton	6.17 (53)	South Melbourne	10.5 (65)	MCG	17 September

=== Preliminary final ===
Home team	Score	Away team	Score	Venue	Date
Collingwood	8.7 (55)	South Melbourne	6.8 (44)	MCG	24 September

=== Grand final ===
Team	1 Qtr	2 Qtr	3 Qtr	Final
Carlton	1.2	2.6	4.9	6.11 (47)
Collingwood	4.3	5.3	8.5	9.7 (61)

== Season notes ==
- Former Carlton coach Jack Worrall was appointed umpires' coach, with a view to raising standards and decreasing violence.
- Round 2, originally scheduled for 7 May, was postponed by one week, and remaining rounds pushed back by one week, due to the death of King Edward VII on 6 May. The Victorian Football Association and Metropolitan Junior Football Association also took the same action.
- In the last quarter of the round 4 match between Carlton and South Melbourne, Carlton's George Topping coward-hit South Melbourne's Bert Streckfuss behind the play, causing spectators to jump the fence and participate in an all-in melee with players and officials. Topping was suspended for the remainder of 1910 and all of 1911 as a result of the incident.
- VFL conducted an inquiry into allegations that particular players from Carlton, Fitzroy, Melbourne, and South Melbourne had been paid to play "dead". In particular, Carlton's Doug Gillespie, Alex "Bongo" Lang, and Doug Fraser were investigated (the inquiry dealt with Lang and Fraser behind closed doors). Gillespie was exonerated, while Lang and Fraser were each suspended for five years.
- St Kilda, after losing its first seventeen games, defeated minor premier Carlton in a major upset in the last round to avoid its expected fifth winless season. It remains the worst start by a VFL/AFL team that did not finish winless, although equalled in 2001 by Fremantle and in 2013 by Greater Western Sydney.
- Carlton player and Secretary Arthur Charles "Shooter" Ford was charged with abusing and physically threatening the field umpire (off the field) after Carlton's round 14 match against Fitzroy; Ford was suspended for 12 months and debarred from his role as club secretary. There was speculation that the issue between the two was connected with the suspension of George Topping earlier in the season.
- T.W Sherrin manufactured special footballs for the Premiership Finals.

== Awards ==
- The 1910 VFL Premiership team was Collingwood.
- The VFL's leading goalkicker was Percy Martini of Geelong with 51 goals.
- St Kilda took the "wooden spoon" in 1910.

== Sources ==
- 1910 VFL season at AFL Tables
- 1910 VFL season at Australian Football
