= Arthur Ford (Australian footballer) =

Australian rules footballer

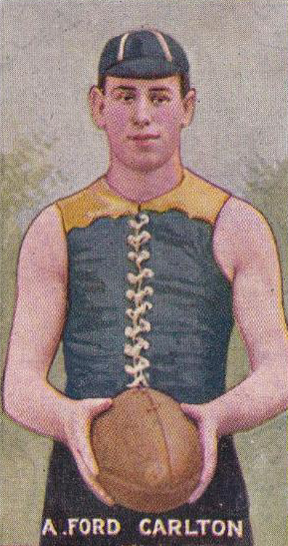
- Cigarette card of Ford in 1906

Personal information
- Full name: Arthur Charles Alexander Ford
- Nickname: Shooter
- Born: 12 June 1881; Heathcote, Victoria
- Died: 14 May 1953 (aged 71); Newstead, Queensland
- Original team: Essendon Town
- Height: 180 cm (5 ft 11 in)
- Weight: 83 kg (183 lb)
- Position: Defender

Playing career^{1}
Years	Club	Games (Goals)
1903, 1908–12	Carlton	64 (10)
- ^{1} Playing statistics correct to the end of 1912.

Arthur 'Shooter' Ford (12 June 1881 – 14 May 1953) was an Australian rules footballer who played for Carlton in the Victorian Football League (VFL).

== Biography ==
A defender, Ford make his league debut in 1903 but after just one season, left Carlton for Western Australia. The Essendon Town recruit played initially at West Perth, where he was a member of their 1905 West Australian Football League premiership team, before spending some time at Boulder City in the Goldfields Football Association.

Ford returned to Carlton towards the end of the 1908 season and played in that year's premiership side, the third in a row for the club. He was also a half back flanker in the 1909 VFL Grand Final, which Carlton lost. During his time at Carlton he acted as club secretary but lost the job following a controversial incident in their Round 14, 1910 match against Fitzroy. Following the match, Ford was cited for abusing and physically threatening the field umpire which resulted in a 12-month suspension. A possible reason for Ford's abuse was that it was the same umpire who had suspended his teammate George Topping earlier in the season.

He resumed his career once the suspension ended in 1911 and participated in his club's finals campaign that year. After the Preliminary Final loss to Essendon, Ford retired for the VFL and became captain-coach of Echuca. Ford did however return briefly in 1912 for the finals once more before retiring for good.
