= Deas (surname) =

Deas is a Scottish surname. People with this surname include:

- Bob Deas (1886–1960), Australian rules footballer
- Sir David Deas (1807–1876), medical officer in the Royal Navy
- Charles Deas (1818–1867), American painter
- David Deas (disambiguation)
- Deborah V. Deas, American psychiatrist and academic administrator
- Francis William Deas (1862–1951), Scottish architect
- Sir George Deas (1804–1887), Scottish judge
- Jack Deas (1875–1949), Australian rules footballer
- James Deas (disambiguation)
- Justin Deas (born 1948), American actor
- Laura Deas (born 1988), Welsh athlete
- Lionel Deas (1872–1913), English cricketer
- Lynn Deas (1952–2020), American professional bridge player
- Malcolm Deas (1941–2023), English historian of Colombia and Latin America
- Paul Deas (born 1972), retired Scottish professional footballer
- Sir Edward Deas Thomson (1800–1879), Australian politician
- Zachariah C. Deas (1819–1882), brigadier general in the Confederate States Army during the American Civil War

== See also ==
- Deas (disambiguation)
