= Deas =

Deas or DEAS may refer to:

- Deas (surname), a Scottish surname originating in Fife
- Deas Island, a river island in British Columbia, Canada
- Deas Vail, an American rock band
- Department of East Asian Studies at various universities, including
- Department of East Asian Studies, University of Delhi
- Division of Engineering and Applied Sciences, former name of the Harvard School of Engineering and Applied Sciences

== See also ==
- I-DEAS, a computer-aided design software package
- Dea (disambiguation)
