= Dees =

Dees may refer to:

- Dees (surname), including a list of people with the name
- Dickinson Dees, British law firm
- Larsen v Rick Dees Ltd, 2007 New Zealand Supreme Court case
- Melbourne Football Club, an Australian rules football team nicknamed 'Dees'

== See also ==
- Dee (disambiguation), singular form
- Dee's Drive-In
- Sneaky Dee's
