= Dees (surname) =

Dees is a surname. Notable people with the name include:

- Archie Dees (1936–2016), American professional basketball player
- Benny Dees (1934–2021), American college basketball coach
- Bill Dees (1939–2012), American musician
- Bob Dees (1929–1997), American professional football player
- Charlie Dees (born 1935), American professional baseball player
- Dick Dees (born 1944), Dutch politician
- Harry P. Dees (1912–2004), American lawyer
- James Parker Dees (1915–1990), American founder and first bishop of the Anglican Orthodox Church and the Orthodox Anglican Communion
- Julie Dees, also known as Julie McWhirter (born 1947) American voice actress
- Mary Dees (1911–2004), American stage and screen actress
- Morris Dees (born 1936), co-founder and chief trial counsel for the Southern Poverty Law Center
- Rick Dees (born 1950), American comedic performer, entertainer, and radio personality
- Robert F. Dees (born 1950), United States Army Brigadier General and Major General
- Sam Dees (born 1945), American soul singer, songwriter and producer
- Tony Dees (born 1963), American hurdler
- William J. Dees (1874–1940), English boxer

== See also ==
- Dee
- Deas
- Dease (disambiguation)
- Rick Dees Weekly Top 40, a radio program
