= Noise, vibration, and harshness =

Study and modification of the noise and vibration characteristics of vehicles

Noise, vibration, and harshness (NVH), also known as noise and vibration (N&V), is the study and modification of the noise and vibration characteristics of vehicles, particularly cars and trucks. While noise and vibration can be readily measured, harshness is a subjective quality, and is measured either via jury evaluations, or with analytical tools that can provide results reflecting human subjective impressions. The latter tools belong to the field psychoacoustics.

Interior NVH deals with noise and vibration experienced by the occupants of the cabin, while exterior NVH is largely concerned with the noise radiated by the vehicle, and includes drive-by noise testing.

NVH is mostly engineering, but often objective measurements fail to predict or correlate well with the subjective impression on human observers. For example, although the ear's response at moderate noise levels is approximated by A-weighting, two different noises with the same A-weighted level are not necessarily equally disturbing. The field of psychoacoustics is partly concerned with this correlation.

In some cases, the NVH engineer is asked to change the sound quality, by adding or subtracting particular harmonics, rather than making the vehicle quieter.

Noise, vibration, and harshness for vehicles can be distinguished easily by quantifying the frequency. Vibration is between 0.5 Hz and 50 Hz, noise is between 20 Hz and 5000 Hz, and harshness takes the coupling of noise and vibration.

== Sources of NVH ==
The sources of noise in a vehicle can be classified as:

- Aerodynamic (e.g., wind, cooling fans of HVAC)
- Mechanical (e.g., engine, driveline, tire contact patch and road surface, brakes)
- Electrical (e.g., electromagnetically induced acoustic noise and vibration coming from electrical actuators, alternator, or traction motor in electric cars)
- Mainly, noise is either structure-borne noise or airborne noise.

Many problems are generated as either vibration or noise, transmitted via a variety of paths, and then radiated acoustically into the cabin. These are classified as "structure-borne" noise. Others are generated acoustically and propagated by airborne paths. Structure-borne noise is attenuated by isolation, while airborne noise is reduced by absorption or through the use of barrier materials. Vibrations are sensed at the steering wheel, the seat, armrests, or the floor and pedals. Some problems are sensed visually, such as the vibration of the rear-view mirror or header rail on open-topped cars.

== Tonal versus broadband ==
NVH can be tonal such as engine noise, or broadband, such as road noise or wind noise, normally. Some resonant systems respond at characteristic frequencies, but in response to random excitation. Therefore, although they look like tonal problems on any one spectrum, their amplitude varies considerably. Other problems are self-resonant, such as whistles from antennas.

Tonal noises often have harmonics. Below is the noise spectrum of Michael Schumacher's Ferrari at 16680 rpm, showing the various harmonics. The x-axis is given in terms of multiples of engine speed. The y-axis is logarithmic, and uncalibrated.

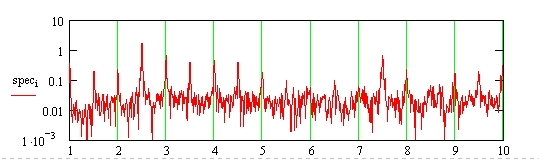

== Instrumentation ==
Typical instrumentation used to measure NVH include microphones, accelerometers, and force gauges or load cells. Many NVH facilities have semi-anechoic chambers, and rolling road dynamometers. Typically, signals are recorded directly to the hard drive via an analog-to-digital converter. In the past, magnetic or DAT tape recorders were used. The integrity of the signal chain is very important, typically each of the instruments used are fully calibrated in a laboratory once per year, and any given setup is calibrated as a whole once per day.

Laser scanning vibrometry is an essential tool for effective NVH optimization. The vibrational characteristics of a sample is acquired full-field under operational or excited conditions. The results represent the actual vibrations. No added mass is influencing the measurement, as the sensor is light itself.

== Investigative techniques ==
Techniques used to help identify NVH include part substitution, modal analysis, rig squeak and rattle tests (complete vehicle or component/system tests), lead cladding, acoustic intensity, transfer path analysis, and partial coherence. Most NVH work is done in the frequency domain, using fast Fourier transforms to convert the time domain signals into the frequency domain. Wavelet analysis, order analysis, statistical energy analysis, and subjective evaluation of signals modified in real time are also used.

== Computer-based modeling ==
NVH analysis needs good representative prototypes of the production vehicle for testing. These are needed early in the design process as the solutions often need substantial modification to the design, forcing in engineering changes which are much less expensive when made early. These early prototypes are very expensive, so there has been great interest in computer aided predictive techniques for NVH.

One example is the modeling works for structure borne noise and vibration analysis. When the phenomenon being considered occurs below, for example, 25–30 Hz, the idle shaking of the powertrain, a multi-body model can be used. In contrast, when the phenomenon being considered occurs at relatively high frequency – for example, above 1 kHz – a statistical energy analysis (SEA) model may be a better approach.

For the mid-frequency band, various methodologies exist, such as vibro-acoustic finite element analysis, and boundary element analysis. The structure can be coupled to the interior cavity and form a fully coupled equation system. Also, other techniques exist that can mix measured data with finite element or boundary element data.

== Typical solutions ==
There are three principal means of improving NVH:

- Reducing the source strength, as in making a noise source quieter with a muffler, or improving the balance of a rotating mechanism
- Interrupting the noise or vibration path, with barriers (for noise) or isolators (for vibration)
- Absorption of the noise or vibration energy, as for example with foam noise absorbers, or tuned vibration dampers

Deciding which of these (or what combination) to use in solving a particular problem is one of the challenges facing the NVH engineer.

Specific methods for improving NVH include the use of tuned mass dampers, subframes, balancing, modifying the stiffness or mass of structures, retuning exhausts and intakes, modifying the characteristics of elastomeric isolators, adding sound deadening or absorbing materials, and using active noise control. In some circumstances, substantial changes in vehicle architecture may be the only way to cure some problems cost-effectively.

Not-for-profit organizations such as the American Society of Heating, Refrigerating, and Air-Conditioning Engineers (ASHRAE) and Vibration Isolation and Seismic Control Manufacturers Association (VISCMA) provide specifications, standards, and requirements that cover a wide array of industries including electrical, mechanical, plumbing, and HVAC.

== See also ==
- Acoustic camera
- Acoustic quieting
- Engine balance
- Health effects from noise
- Noise control
- Noise mitigation
- Vibration calibrator
- Vibration isolation
- Acoustical measurements and instrumentation

== Bibliography ==
- Baxa (1982). Noise Control in Internal Combustion Engines.
- Beranek. Acoustics.
- Griffin. Handbook of Human Vibration.
- Harris. Shock and Vibration Handbook.
- Thomson. Theory of Vibration with Applications.
- White; Walker (1982). Noise and Vibration. Chichester [West Sussex]: Ellis Horwood. ISBN 0-470-27553-7.
- Campillo-Davo; Rassili, eds. (2016). NVH Analysis Techniques for Design and Optimization of Hybrid and Electric Vehicles. ISBN 978-3-8440-4356-3.
