= DEA (disambiguation) =

DEA is the Drug Enforcement Administration, a United States federal law enforcement agency.

DEA may also refer to:

== Organizations ==
- Drug Enforcement Administration (Syria), a government agency
- Drug Enforcement Agency (Liberia), a government agency
- DEA (charity), Development Education Association or Think Global, a UK charity
- Department of Economic Affairs (UK), a former UK government department
- Department of External Affairs (Canada), a government department, now named Global Affairs Canada
- Internationalist Workers' Left (Greece), abbreviated DEA, a political party in Greece
- DEA AG, a German public utility, originally named Deutsche Erdöl AG
- Detectives' Endowment Association, a New York City police labor union
- Danish Energy Agency, part of the Danish Ministry of Climate and Energy

== Science and technology ==
- Data Encryption Algorithm, the block cipher algorithm defined in (and often referred to as) the Data Encryption Standard
- Data envelopment analysis, a nonparametric method in operations research and econometrics
- Dielectric thermal analysis or Dielectric Analysis, measures changes in dipole orientation and ion mobility in polymers
- Diethanolamine, an organic compound with the formula HN(CH_{2}CH_{2}OH)_{2}.
- Diethylamine an organic compound with the formula (CH_{3}CH_{2})_{2}NH.
- Disposable email address, a unique email box used for a single contact
- Docosatetraenoylethanolamide, a biologically active lipid molecule
- Dog erythrocyte antigen, a canine blood type
- Dynamical energy analysis, a high-frequency asymptotic method in numerical acoustics

== Education and society ==
- Diploma de Estudios Avanzados, a Spanish graduate degree
- Diplôme d'études approfondies, a former French graduate degree
- Survivors' and Dependents' Educational Assistance Program (DEA), part of the G.I. Bill

== Media and entertainment ==
- DEA (1990 TV series), a drama TV show
- DEA (2008 TV series), a reality-TV show

== Transport ==
- Deal railway station, Kent, England, National Rail station code
- Dera Ghazi Khan International Airport, IATA code

== Other uses ==
- District Electoral Area, electoral divisions in local government in Northern Ireland

== See also ==
- Dea (disambiguation)
