= Dynamical energy analysis =

Dynamical energy analysis (DEA) is a method for numerically modelling structure borne sound and vibration in complex structures. It is applicable in the mid-to-high frequency range and is in this regime computational more efficient than traditional deterministic approaches (such as finite element and boundary element methods). In comparison to conventional statistical approaches such as statistical energy analysis (SEA), DEA provides more structural details and is less problematic with respect to subsystem division. The DEA method predicts the flow of vibrational wave energy across complex structures in terms of (linear) transport equations. These equations are then discretized and solved on meshes.

== Key point summary of DEA ==
- High frequency method in numerical acoustics.
- The flow of energy is tracked across a mesh. Can be thought of as ray tracing using density of rays instead of individual rays.
- Can use existing FEM meshes. No remodelling necessary.
- Computational time is independent of frequency.
- The necessary mesh resolution does not depend on frequency and can be chosen coarser than in FEM. It only should resolve the geometry.
- Fine structural details can be resolved, in contrast to SEA which gives only one number per subsystem.
- Greater flexibility for the models usable by DEA. No implicit assumptions (equilibrium in weakly coupled subsystems) as in SEA.

== Introduction ==
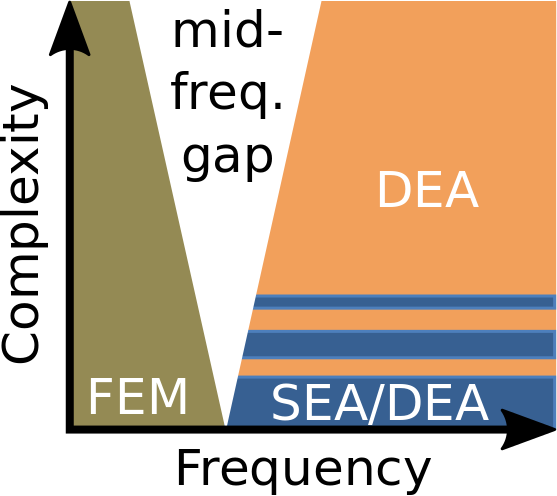
This image describes the range of applicability of dynamical energy analysis (DEA) in comparison to statistical energy analysis (SEA) and the finite element method (FEM). Horizontal axis is frequency, vertical axis is complexity of the structure.

Simulations of the vibro-acoustic properties of complex structures (such as cars, ships, and airplanes) are routinely carried out in various design stages. For low frequencies, the established method of choice is the finite element method (FEM). But high frequency analysis using FEM requires very fine meshes of the body structure to capture the shorter wavelengths and therefore is computational extremely costly. Furthermore the structural response at high frequencies is very sensitive to small variations in material properties, geometry and boundary conditions. This makes the output of a single FEM calculation less reliable and makes ensemble averages necessary furthermore enhancing computational cost. Therefore at high frequencies other numerical methods with better computational efficiency are preferable.

The statistical energy analysis (SEA) has been developed to deal with high frequency problems and leads to relatively small and simple models. However, SEA is based on a set of often hard to verify assumptions, which effectively require diffuse wave fields and quasi-equilibrium of wave energy within weakly coupled (and weakly damped) sub-systems.

One alternative to SEA is to instead consider the original vibrational wave problem in the high frequency limit, leading to a ray tracing model of the structural vibrations. (Note: Well known examples for this mechanism are the transition from quantum mechanics to classical mechanics and the transition from electromagnetic wave dynamics to light rays.) The tracking of individual rays across multiple reflection is not computational feasible because of the proliferation of trajectories. Instead, a better approach is tracking densities of rays propagated by a transfer operator. This forms the basis of the Dynamical Energy Analysis (DEA) method introduced in reference. DEA can be seen as an improvement over SEA where one lifts the diffusive field and the well separated subsystem assumption. One uses an energy density which depends both on position and momentum. DEA can work with relatively fine meshes where energy can flow freely between neighboring mesh cells. This allows far greater flexibility for the models used by DEA in comparison to the restriction imposed by SEA. No remodeling as for SEA is necessary as DEA can use meshes created for a FE analysis. As a result, finer structural details than SEA can be resolved by DEA.

== Method ==
The implementation of DEA on meshes is called Discrete Flow Mapping (DFM). We will here briefly describe the idea behind DFM, for details see the references below. Using DFM it is possible to compute vibro-acoustic energy densities in complex structures at high frequencies, including multi-modal propagation and curved surfaces. DFM is a mesh based technique where a transfer operator is used to describe the flow of energy through boundaries of subsystems of the structure; the energy flow is represented in terms of a density of rays $\rho$, that is, the energy flux through a given surface is given through the density of rays passing through the surface at point $s$ with direction $p$. Here, $s$ parametrises the surface and $p$ is the direction component tangential to the surface. In what follows, the surfaces is represented by the union of all boundaries of the mesh cells of the FE mesh describing the car floor. The density $\rho(s,p) =\rho(X_s)$, with phase space coordinate $X_s = (s,p)$, is transported from one boundary to the adjacent boundary intersection via the boundary integral operator

$$\mathcal{B}[\rho](X'_s):= \int w(X'_s) \delta(X'_s-\phi(X_s)) \rho(X_s) \, \mathrm{d}X_s$$	1

where $\phi(X_s)$ is the map determining where a ray starting on a boundary segment at point $s$ with direction $p_s$ passes through another boundary segment, and $w(X_s)$ is a factor containing damping and reflection/transmission coefficients (akin to the coupling loss factors in SEA). It also governs the mode conversion probabilities in the case of both in-plane and flexural waves, which are derived from wave scattering theory. This allows DEA to take curvature and varying material parameters into account. Equation (1) is a way to write ray tracing across one single mesh cell in terms of an integral equation transferring an energy density from one surface to an adjacent surface.

In a next step, the transfer operator (1) is discretised using a set of basis functions of the phase space. Once the matrix ${\bf B}$ has been constructed, the final energy density $\rho$ on the boundary phase-space of each element is given in terms of the initial density $\rho_0$by the solution of a linear system of the form

$$({\bf 1} - {\bf B}) \rho = \rho_0.$$	2

The initial density $\rho_0$ models some source distribution for vibrational excitations, for example the engine in ship. Once the final density $\rho$ (describing the energy density on all cell boundaries) has been computed, the energy density at any location inside the structure may be computed as a post-processing step.

Concerning the terminology, there is some ambiguity concerning the terms "Discrete Flow Mapping(DFM)" and "Dynamical Energy Analysis". To some extent, one can use one term in place of the other. For example, consider a plate. In DFM, one would subdivide the plate into many small triangles and propagate the flow of energy from triangle to (neighbouring) triangle. In DEA, one would not subdivide the plate, but use some high order basis functions (both in position and momentum) on the boundary of the plate. But in principle it would be admissible to describe both procedures as either DFM or DEA.

== Examples ==
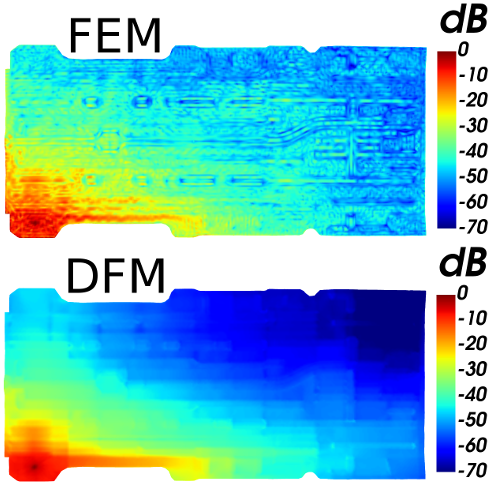
This image compares the results from Dynamical Energy Analysis (DEA) with that of frequency averaged FEM. Shown is the kinetic energy distribution resulting from a point excitation on a carfloor panel on a logarithmic color scale.

As an example application, a simulation of a car floor panel is shown here. A point excitation at 2500 Hz with 0.04 hysteretic damping was applied. The results from a frequency averaged FEM simulation are compared with a DEA simulation (for DEA, no frequency averaging is necessary). The results also show a good quantitative agreement. In particular, we see the directional dependence of the energy flow, which is predominantly in the horizontal direction as plotted. This is caused by several horizontally extended out-of-plane bulges. It is only in the lower right part of the panel, with negligible energy content, that deviations between the FEM and DFM predictions are visible. The total kinetic energy given by the DFM prediction is within 12% of the FEM prediction.

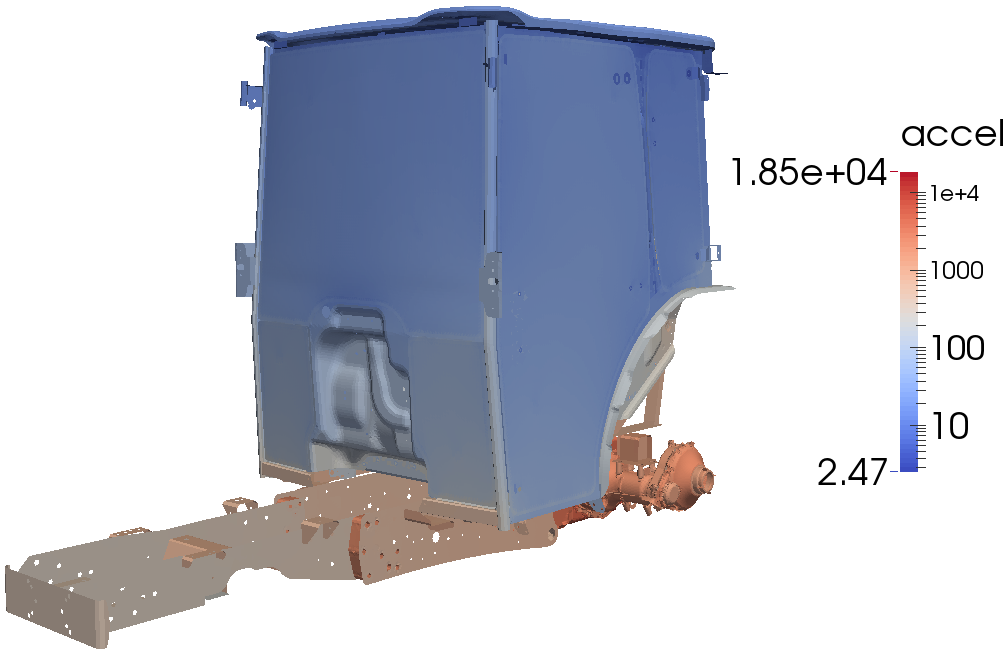
This image shows the result of a DEA simulation on a model of a Yanmar tractor. Shown is the out-of-plane acceleration on a logarithmic color scale for a frequency of 1000 Hz.

As a more applied example, the result of a DEA simulation on a Yanmar tractor model (body in blue: chassis/cabin steel frame and windows) is shown here to the left. The numerical DEA results are compared with experimental measurements at frequencies between 400 Hz and 4000 Hz for an excitation on the back of the gear casing. Both results agree favorably. The DEA simulation can be extended to predict the sound pressure level at driver's ear.
