= Dea =

Dea is the Latin word for "goddess" and may refer to:

== Goddesses in Roman antiquity ==
- Bona Dea, a (mostly) exclusively women's goddess introduced from Magna Graeca
- Dea Dia, goddess of growth in Roman mythology
- Nenia Dea, goddess of funerals in Roman mythology
- Dea Matrona or "Divine mother goddess", goddess of the river Marne in Gaul
- Dea Sequana, goddess of the river Seine in Gallo-Roman religion
- Dea Syria or Atargatis, "Goddess of Syria"
- Dea Tacita, or "Silent goddess", goddess of the dead in Roman mythology

== People ==
=== Given name ===
- Dea Birkett (born 1958), British writer
- Dea Ecker, German architect
- Dea Herdželaš (born 1996), Bosnian tennis player
- Dea Klein-Šumanovac (born 1981), Croatian basketball player
- Dea Kulumbegashvili, Georgian film director and writer
- Dea Loher (born 1964), pseudonym of German writer Andrea Beate Loher
- Dea Norberg (born 1974), Swedish singer
- Dea Rizkita (born 1993), Miss Grand Indonesia 2017; see Puteri Indonesia 2017
- Dea Trier Mørch (1941–2001), Danish writer
- N'Dea Davenport (born 1966), American singer
- N'dea Jones (born 1999), American basketball player

=== Second given name ===
- Alma Dea Morani (1907–2001), American plastic surgeon
- Maretha Dea Giovani (born 1994), Indonesian badminton player

=== Surname ===
- Alex Dea, American composer
- Billy Dea (born 1933), Canadian ice hockey centre and head coach
- Gloria Dea (1922–2023), American actress, magician, and businesswoman
- Matt Dea (born 1991), Australian football player
- Jean-Sébastien Dea (born 1994), Canadian ice hockey player
- Marie Déa (1912–1992), pseudonym of French actress Odette Alice Marie Deupès
- Tommy Dea (1908–1986), Australian rules footballer

== Other uses ==
- A character in the 1869 novel The Man Who Laughs by Victor Hugo
- A dialect of the Managalasi or Ese language
- An alternative name for the Zimakani language
- La Dea, a nickname of the Italian football club Atalanta B.C.
- Dea., an archaic abbreviation for Deacon

== See also ==
- DEA (disambiguation)
- O'Dea, Irish surname
- Deas (disambiguation)
- Dease (disambiguation)
