= Ambarvalia =

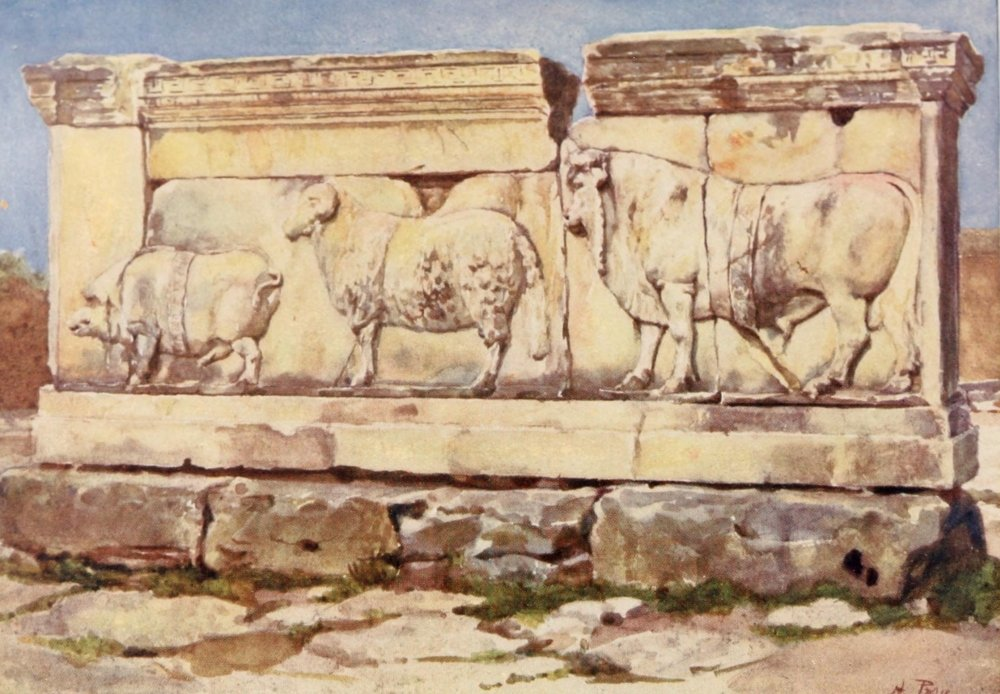
Relief depicting the three animals sacrificed at the Ambarvalia as part of a suovetaurilia (a sow, a sheep, and a bull)

Ambarvalia was a Roman agricultural fertility rite, involving animal sacrifices and held on 29 May in honor of Ceres, Bacchus and Dea Dia. However, the exact timing could vary since Ambarvalia were "feriae conceptivae" - a festival not bound to a fixed date.

== Summary ==
Ambarvalia is believed to have taken its name from the words "ambiō" - "I go round" and "arvum" - "field". During the festival, they sacrificed a bull, a sow, and a sheep, which were led in procession thrice around the fields. This sacrifice was called a suovetaurilia in Latin. Ambarvalia can be of two kinds: public and private. The private were solemnized by the masters of families, accompanied by their children and servants, in the villages and farms out of Rome. The public was celebrated within the city's boundaries, in which twelve fratres arvales walked at the head of a procession of citizens who had lands and vineyards in Rome. During the procession, prayers would be made to the goddess. The ambervale carmen was the preferred prayer.

The name "Ambarvalia" appears to be predominantly an urban designation. Roman farmers' almanacs (Menologia rustica) describe this only as segetes lustrantur ("crops are purified"). Scaliger, in his notes on Festus, maintains the ambarvalia to be the same as amburbium. Numerous other communities of the Italian peninsula enacted similar rites with different names.

== In literature ==
- "Ambarvalia" (1849) is a collection of poems by Thomas Burbidge and Arthur H. Clough.
- "Ambarvalia" (1933) a poetry collection by Nishiwaki Junzaburo, is considered a seminal contribution to Japanese modernism. Its influence is likened to that of T.S. Eliot's "The Waste Land".
- In chapter I of Walter Pater's 1885 novel Marius the Epicurean, set in ancient Rome, the protagonist, Marius, engages in the ritual observance of Ambarvalia

== In music ==
- "Ambarvalia" is an orchestral composition by Ruth Gipps from 1988. It was first recorded in 2019 by the Royal Liverpool Philharmonic Orchestra.
