= David Deas =

David Deas may refer to:

- Sir David Deas (Royal Navy officer) (1807–1876), Scottish medical officer in the Royal Navy
- David Deas (rugby union) (1919–2001), Scottish rugby union player
- David Deas (mayor) (1771–1822), intendant (mayor) of Charleston, South Carolina
