= Dea Dia =

Roman goddess of fertility

- Goddess of fertility and growth
- Festivals: Ambarvalia

Equivalents
- Greek: Demeter

Dea Dia (Latin: "Goddess of Daylight", or "Bright Goddess") was a goddess of fertility and growth in ancient Roman religion. She was sometimes identified with Ceres, and sometimes with her Greek equivalent Demeter.

She was worshiped during Ambarvalia, a festival to Ceres. Every May, her priests, the Fratres Arvales, held a three-day festival in her honor.

The name Dea Dīa (Classical Latin: [ˈd̪e.a ˈd̪iː.a]) means 'Goddess of Daylight' or 'Bright Goddess'. The first element stems from the Latin dea ('goddess'), while the second is related to diēs ('day'), probably in reference to the ritual prescription to announce in January the May ceremonies sub divo culmine ('under the celestial vault').

== See also ==
- Other goddesses also known as Dea ("The Goddess")
- Other goddesses also known as Dia ("The Divine One")
