= Francis William Deas =

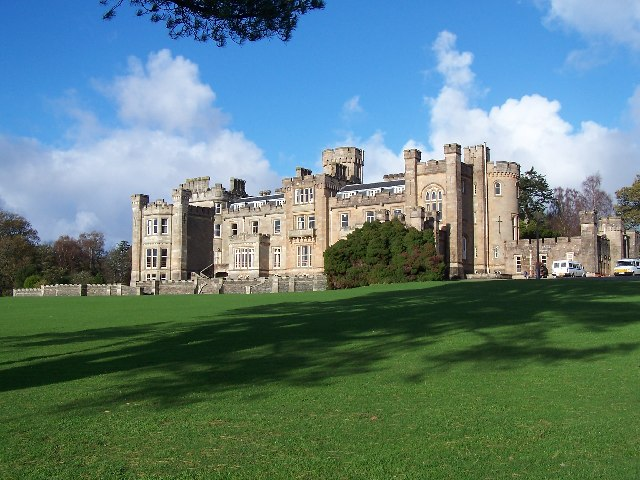
Castle Toward

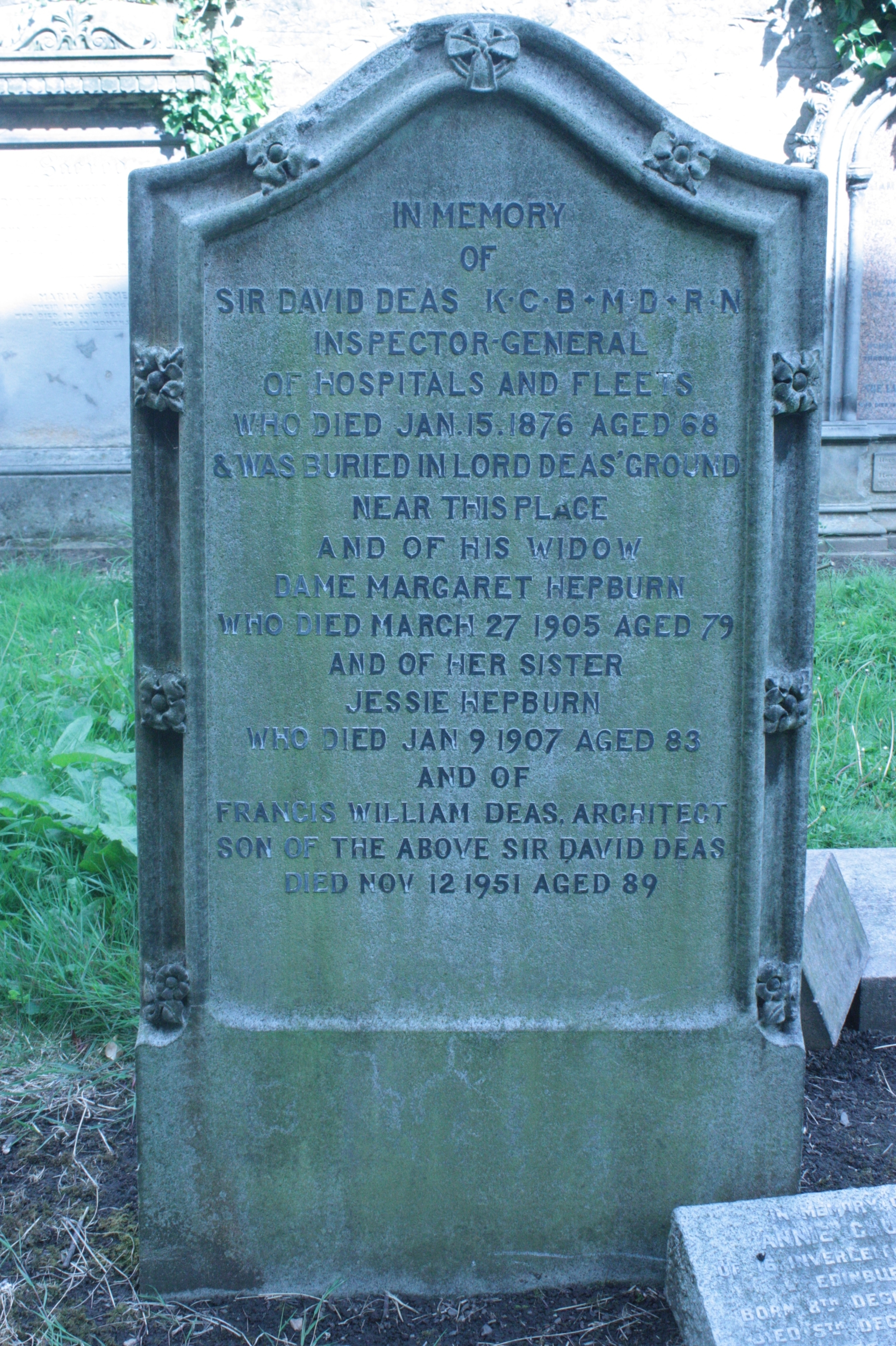
The Deas grave, Warriston Cemetery

Francis William Deas (1862 –13 November 1951) was a Scottish Arts and Crafts architect and landscape designer in the late 19th century and first half of the 20th century. He was a keen amateur painter, largely of landscapes. His most important work was probably the restoration of Castle Toward.

== Life ==
He was born in Haslar in Hampshire. He was the son of Margaret Hepburn and Sir David Deas, a naval surgeon. His grandfather was Francis Deas, provost of Falkland in Fife.

When his father died in 1876 his father’s brother, Sir George Deas took over the role of organising his education and sent him to Charterhouse School then to the University of Edinburgh. From that point onward he remained in Scotland.

In 1890 he was articled to Robert Rowand Anderson and also began attending the new Edinburgh College of Art under Prof Frank Worthington Simon where he studied for three years.

From 1896-97 he made a study trip undertaking many measured drawings. This was partly in the companionship of Robert Lorimer (who was a lifelong friend), who apparently swayed him from his original intention of being an interior designer to instead be an architect. He returned to Edinburgh late in 1897 and set up an office at 63 Frederick Street which he shared with Victor Daniel Horsburgh (but not as partners). In 1902 he set up in a grander office at 15 Rutland Square, leased from Robert Rowand Anderson (now the headquarters of the RIAS).

Deas never married, and may be safely assumed to have been homosexual. In 1908 he built an impressive home in Aberdour which he called The Murrel. This has a strong Arts and Crafts flavour and its garden is allegedly laid out by Gertrude Jekyll. He invested in property in both Austria and Turkey and losing them both as a result of World War I. Due to the financial pressures he sold The Murrel in 1915. Thereafter he resided at a villa at Greenhill Gardens in Edinburgh.

His finances improved with a major commission in 1921 to extend and restore Castle Toward which provided six years of work. At the conclusion of this work he went into semi-retirement and worked with Christopher Hussey on studying the work of Robert Lorimer. This culminated, in part, in a paper published in the RIBA Journal in February 1931 on the life and work of Lorimer.

He retired completely in 1937. He died in 1951 and left his collection of art and Chinese pottery to the Royal Scottish Museum.

He is buried with his father in Warriston Cemetery near the sealed east gate.

== Principal works ==
- Rebuilding of Hindley Hall and House, Northumberland (1907)
- The Murrel, Aberdour (1908)
- Rebuilding of Fyndynate House, Aberfeldy (1909)
- Walled garden and gardener’s cottage at Kinfauns Castle (1910)
- House and garden at 16 Inverleith Terrace ("The Little House"), Edinburgh (1912)
- Remodelling of gardens and gardener’s cottage, Donibristle House, Fife (1913)
- Kellas House and lodge, Morayshire (1913)
- Layout for new burial ground, Culross Abbey Church (1914)
- War Memorial, Aberdour Old Parish Church (1919)
- Major alterations and restoration, Castle Toward (1921-8)
- Alterations to Archerfield House, East Lothian (1923)
- Estate Cottages Knightshayes estate, Devon (1923)
- 1 Easter Belmont Road, Edinburgh (1924)
