= Jack Deas =

Australian rules footballer

Personal information
- Full name: John Deas
- Nickname: Jack
- Born: 5 November 1875; Port Melbourne, Victoria
- Died: 23 August 1949 (aged 73); Caulfield, Victoria
- Original team: Leopold (MJFA)
- Position: Defender

Playing career^{1}
Years	Club	Games (Goals)
1897	South Melbourne	2 (0)
1899–1901	Fitzroy	33 (0)
1902	Essendon	3 (0)
Total		38 (0)
- ^{1} Playing statistics correct to the end of 1902.

Career highlights
- VFL premiership player: 1899

John Deas (5 November 1875 – 23 August 1949) was an Australian rules footballer who played for the South Melbourne Football Club, Fitzroy Football Club and Essendon Football Club in the Victorian Football League (VFL).

== Family ==
The son of John Deas (1843–1891), and Elizabeth Deas (1851-1925), née Scott, John Deas was born at Port Melbourne, Victoria on 5 November 1875. His brother, George Deas (1888–1958), played VFL football with South Melbourne and VFA football with Port Melbourne; another brother, Robert "Bob" Deas (1886-1960), also played VFL football with South Melbourne.

He married Irene Styche Colby (1882–1941) on 2 November 1912. They had two children: a daughter, Nancy (b.1915), and a son, Geoffrey (b.1918), who died in his infancy.

== Cricket ==
He played cricket with the South Melbourne Cricket Club.

== Football ==
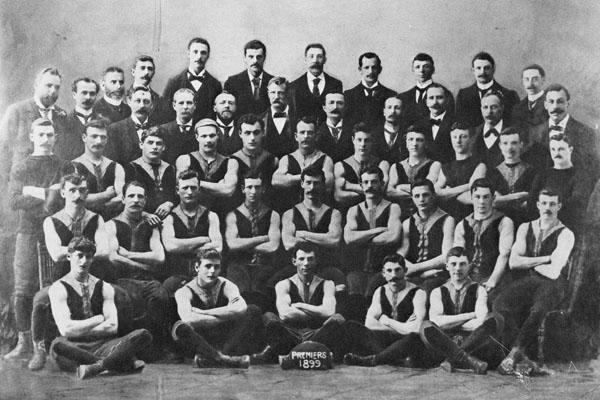
Fitzroy Football Team (1899 Premiers) Jack Deas is seated at far right, second row.

=== South Melbourne (VFA) ===
Deas, who was a defender, was recruited from the Leopold Football Club in the Victorian Junior Football Association (MJFA), with whom he played in 1895 and 1896. He played one game with the South Melbourne Football Club in the VFA in 1896.

=== South Melbourne (VFL) ===
He played in two games with South Melbourne in the first-ever year of the VFL competition (1897).

=== Fitzroy (VFL) ===
He was cleared from South Melbourne to Fitzroy in May 1899. He played in 15 consecutive matches, following his debut in round 3, and was a half-back flanker in Fitzroy's 1899 premiership side.

=== Essendon (VFL) ===
After a further two seasons at Fitzroy he crossed to Essendon where he played one final season.

== Employment ==
He was employed by the Public Works Department for 48 years, the last 25 as engineer-in-charge at the Melbourne Law Courts.

== Death ==
He died at his residence in Caulfield, Victoria on 23 August 1949.
