= Bob Deas =

Australian rules footballer (1886–1960)

Personal information
- Full name: Robert Deas
- Born: 17 September 1886; Port Melbourne, Victoria
- Died: 1 April 1960 (aged 73); Parkville, Victoria
- Original team: Leopold (MJFA)
- Debut: Round 1, 1909, South Melbourne vs. Geelong, at Corio Oval
- Height: 180 cm (5 ft 11 in)
- Weight: 82 kg (181 lb)

Playing career^{1}
| Years | Club | Games (Goals) |
| 1909–1917 | South Melbourne | 111 (73) |
- ^{1} Playing statistics correct to the end of 1917.

Robert Deas (17 September 1886 – 1 April 1960) was an Australian rules footballer who played with South Melbourne in the Victorian Football League (VFL).

== Family ==
The son of John Deas (1843–1891), and Elizabeth Deas (1851-1925), née Scott, Robert Deas was born at Port Melbourne, Victoria on 11 September 1886. His brother, John "Jack" Deas (1875-1949), played VFL football with South Melbourne, Fitzroy, and Essendon; another brother, George Deas (1888–1958), played VFL football with South Melbourne and VFA football with Port Melbourne.

== Football ==
Recruited from the Leopold Football Club in the Victorian Junior Football Association (MJFA). After kicking four goals on his debut in the opening round of the 1909 season, Deas played every game that year up until the club's second final. He was recalled however for the 1909 Grand Final where he played as a centre-half forward in a two-point win. He finished the year with 29 goals and kicked a further 26 the following season. From 1912 onwards he was used as a fullback and played in South Melbourne's losing Grand Final teams of 1912 and 1914.
