= UC Riverside School of Medicine =

Medical school of UC Riverside

University of California, Riverside, School of Medicine
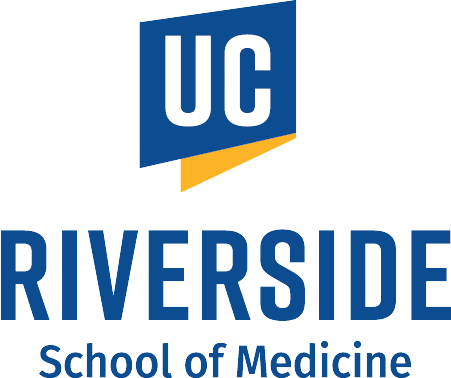
- Motto: Fiat lux Let there be light
- Type: Public
- Established: 2008
- Parent institution: University of California, Riverside
- Dean: Deborah V. Deas
- Location: Riverside, California, USA; 33°58′30″N 117°19′30″W
- Website: medschool.ucr.edu

The University of California, Riverside (UCR), School of Medicine is the graduate medical school of the University of California, Riverside, acting as one of six University of California medical schools. It enrolled its first class in 2013, with the first class of 40 medical students receiving their degrees on June 9, 2017.

The school is made up of the Division of Biomedical Sciences and the Division of Clinical Sciences. In addition to undergraduate medical education, the school sponsors and co-sponsors residencies and fellowships in several fields.

== History ==
The UCR School of Medicine is built on the foundation of the former UCR/UCLA Thomas Haider Program in Biomedical Sciences, which had been in place since 1974. The program was named in honor of Dr. Thomas T Haider, a Riverside spine surgeon. The program offered the first two years of medical school instruction at UCR to selected students, after which students transferred to the David Geffen School of Medicine at UCLA to complete the clinical clerkships for their M.D. degrees which are awarded by UCLA. Through this program over 850 students have begun their medical education at UC Riverside and completed their medical degrees at UCLA. After the opening of the UCR School of Medicine, the Haider program was revised and now provides a pathway to medical school for up to 24 UCR undergraduate students each year.

The University of California Board of Regents approved establishment of the UCR School of Medicine in 2008, and it enrolled its first incoming class of 50 medical students in fall 2013.

In 2010 G. Richard Olds, M.D., former chair of medicine at the Medical College of Wisconsin, was appointed vice chancellor of health affairs and founding dean. The first building was completed in 2011.

In 2011 the Liaison Committee on Medical Education (LCME) denied preliminary accreditation to the UCR School of Medicine, based primarily on the LCME's assessment that the school had not demonstrated sufficient financial resources to sustain a sound program of medical education. In addition, the LCME found inadequate strategic planning, insufficient key personnel, and weak policies and procedures related to student advancement and diversity. The LCME also found limited clinical education opportunities in psychiatry and pediatrics. The school declined to appeal this decision.

In October 2012 the LCME granted preliminary accreditation to UCR, thus allowing the school to start recruit an inaugural class of 50 students, who entered in August 2013. This is the first time in three decades that an American medical school was approved after previously having been denied. In June 2017, the school of medicine was granted full accreditation by the Liaison Committee on Medical Education (LCME).

The medical school has a program that covers tuition if students commit to working locally for five years in pediatrics, family medicine, emergency medicine, general internal medicine, OB-GYN, general surgery or psychiatry. In June 2016 Dr. Deborah Deas, MD, was hired as the new Dean of the School of Medicine. Previously, Deas was the interim dean of the College of Medicine and professor of psychiatry at the Medical University of South Carolina. During her tenure, she served as senior associate dean for medical education, chief academic officer, associate dean for admissions, and led the College of Medicine’s committee on accreditation by the Liaison Committee for Medical Education.

== See also ==
- List of medical schools in the United States
