= Isidor N. Kahn =

American lawyer (1887–1963)

Isidor N. Kahn (February 28, 1887 – 1963) was an American lawyer best known for arguing Evansville Bowling Green Packet Company v. Chero Cola Bottling in front of the United States Supreme Court in 1926, which is commonly referred to as a defining case in maritime and admiralty law and has been cited over 60 times by federal and state courts in published opinions, including all but one federal circuit court in the U.S. It was most recently cited in 2011 by the Eastern District Court of New York. This case has also been discussed in dozens of current law review articles, including as recently as 2012. Despite its 1920’s holding, the case remains relevant today as it continues to be heavily relied upon in briefs and motions filed throughout the country. Isidor Kahn was the founder of what is today Kahn, Dees, Donovan, & Kahn, LLP, a law firm located in Evansville, Indiana.

== Life and career ==
Isidor Kahn was born on February 28, 1887, in Madisonville, Kentucky. His father, Nathan Kahn, relocated the family to Evansville, Indiana in 1898 where he opened a general merchandise store. Isidor graduated from Evansville High School and went on to attend Indiana University School of Law, from which he graduated with highest honors.

Mr. Kahn opened his first law office in 1908 and became known for his tax and labor law expertise. As his clientele grew and his prominence in the community increased, Isidor was named Vanderburgh County attorney in 1919. In 1924 he was named as president of the Vanderburgh County Bar Association and later served as attorney for the Board of Education. Mr. Kahn established a corporate clientele that included Citizens National Bank, The Gray Family Estate and Trusts, National City Bank (later Integra), and Crescent Plastics. After World War II, Mr. Kahn hired two attorneys, Harry Dees and Arthur Donovan, to handle civil and labor matters respectively. Robert Kahn joined his father's firm 1945.

Kahn died in 1963 at the age of 76.

== Sources ==
- Various Evansville City Directories, 1898-1908, Bennett & Co.
- Esarey Ph. D., Logan A History of Indiana from its exploration to 1922, Volume 3 Dayton, Ohio, Dayton Historical Publishing Co. 1923
- Inglehart, John E. ed An Account of Vanderburgh County From its Organization Dayton, Ohio, Dayton Historical Publishing Co. 1923
- Jackson, Bill D. (2008) Kahn, Dees, Donovan & Kahn, LLP: The First Century, 1908-2008 ISBN 0615175953, 9780615175959
- Shepard's Citations, Lexis-Nexis
- Indiana University Register of the graduates of Indiana University
