= Harry P. Dees =

American lawyer (1912–2004)

Harry Porter Dees (June 4, 1912 – January 27, 2004) was an American lawyer best known for his expertise in business law, healthcare law and labor law. His most notable case, International Union, United Automobile, Aerospace & Agricultural Implement Workers Of America (UAW), AFL-CIO v. Hoosier Cardinal Corp. was argued in front of the United States Supreme Court in 1966. His victory for Hoosier Cardinal Corp. set a precedent for the application of statutes of limitations in labor relations cases and laid the foundation for his career. The importance of Dees' case is underscored by the vast number of references to its holding. This case has been cited in over 1,000 federal court and administrative agency opinions. Every federal circuit court of appeal in the U.S. and countless state courts and administrative agencies have cited Dees' case. The case has been cited over 20 times by the U.S. Supreme Court alone. This case continues to have an undeniable impact in both U.S. academia and the courtroom: it has been discussed in over 100 law review journals, as recently as 2012, as well as several hundred briefs and motions filed throughout U.S. courts.

== Life and career ==
Harry Dees was born on June 4, 1912, in Oklahoma and later moved to Owensboro, Kentucky, where he lived with his grandparents. His grandfather, M.N. Porter, trained mules and later trained and raced thoroughbreds, spurring young Harry's lifelong interest in the sport of horse racing. Upon graduating from Owensboro High School, Harry enrolled in the University of Kentucky and graduated from the UK School of Law in 1935.

Harry Dees began his legal career in 1935 as an attorney working for Isidor N. Kahn in Evansville, Indiana. In 1942, at age 30, Dees volunteered for the US Navy, serving during World War II and stationed in the Solomon Islands. After his release from the Navy, he returned to work with Mr. Kahn, becoming a partner in the firm in 1945.

From the time he was 16 until he died at 91, Harry attended every Kentucky Derby except those when he was serving in World War II. By 1993, he had attended races at 35 tracks in 18 states, in addition to tracks in a number of foreign countries. At his death he was remembered in Kentucky horse racing circles for having attended more Kentucky Derby races than any other patron.

Harry Dees maintained a 70-year association with Kahn, Dees, Donovan, & Kahn, LLP until his death on January 27, 2004, aged 91.
