= Department of East Asian Studies, University of Delhi =

Department of the University of Delhi

Coordinates: 28.6872°N 77.2067°E

Department of East Asian Studies
- Type: Public Area Studies
- Established: 1964
- Academic staff: 11
- Administrative staff: 10
- Students: About 200
- Location: (India) Delhi, Delhi, India
- Campus: Urban
- Affiliations: University of Delhi
- Website: Official website

Department of East Asian Studies (informally called as DEAS, DU), established in 1964 under the aegis of the University of Delhi, offers various courses related to East Asian studies and East Asian languages. The department was initially established as Center of Chinese studies in the year 1964 with active participation by Late Professor V. P. Dutt, a notable scholar in the domain of Chinese studies in India; in 1969, Japanese studies programs were also added. Since then, the department has grown to accommodate Korean studies programs and presently the only department in any Indian University that conducts researches and offers various programs exclusively related to East Asian studies and languages at one place. Further, the department offers a Masters Program in East Asian Studies, that is also unique in India.

== History ==
The department of East Asian Studies, under the initiative of Prof V. P. Dutt, was started as the Center of Chinese studies, in the year 1964, with Prof Dutt as the Department Head, with active support from the Government of India. With this department, it became the first center in India to offer courses on East Asian regional studies. In the year 1969, Japanese language and studies programs was started and with this the department was renamed as Department of Chinese and Japanese Studies. The department further grew to accommodate Korean studies programs from 2000 and with this the nomenclature of the department changed to the present Department of East Asian Studies.

== Courses offered ==
1. Certificate course in Korean Language
2. Doctoral degree in East Asian Studies (Started 1964–1965)
3. M.Phil. degree in East Asian Studies (Started 1978–1979)
4. M.A degree in Japanese Language (Started 1998–1999)
5. M.A degree in East Asian Studies (Started 2008–2009)
6. One Year Post Graduate Intensive Diploma in Japanese (Started 1971–1972)
7. One Year Post Graduate Intensive Advance Diploma in Japanese (Started 1978–1979)
8. One Year Post Graduate Intensive Diploma in Chinese (Started 1971–1972)
9. One Year Post Graduate Intensive Advance Diploma in Chinese (Started 1978–1979)
10. One Year Post Graduate Intensive Diploma in Korean (Started 2008–2009)
11. One Year Post Graduate Intensive Advance Diploma in Korean (Started 2009–2010)

== East Asian Studies Library ==
The department has its own library with a dedicated staff focusing exclusively on the East Asian area studies, which itself is a feat. There are very few departments in University of Delhi that have their own dedicated library system. The department library contains more than 60,000 volumes of books, numerous periodicals, newspapers covering Chinese, Japanese and Korean language and studies. The library also provides ILL services to the students and faculties of this department and outsiders as well. Besides, the department has a separate Journal room with several subscribed current journals. The library also provides access to electronic databases through Delhi University campus network and from anywhere in the world through the UGC-INFONET Digital Library Consortium.
