= Dease =

Dease may refer to:

- Dease Strait, a strait in Nunavut, Canada
- Dease Lake (British Columbia), a lake in BC, Canada
  - Dease Lake, a town in BC, Canada
    - Dease Lake Airport (CYDL), an airport in BC, Canada
    - Dease Lake Highway, a highway in BC, Canada
  - Dease Creek, a creek in BC, Canada
  - Dease River, a river in BC, Canada
    - Dease River First Nation, an aboriginal North American community

== People with the surname ==
- Dennis Dease, U.S. Roman Catholic priest
- Elisa Dease (born 1969), U.S. singer
- John Dease (1906–1979), Australian radio personality
- Maurice Dease (1889–1914), British military officer and Victoria Cross holder
- Michael Dease (born 1982), U.S. jazz musician
- Peter Warren Dease (1788–1863), Canadian fur trader
- Pierre Leverne Dease (born 1982), American drag queen known as Nina Bo'nina Brown
- Teresa Ellen Dease (1820–1889), Irish Roman Catholic nun
- Thomas Dease (1578–1651), Irish Roman Catholic bishop
- William Dease (1752–1798), Irish medical doctor

== See also ==
- Dea (disambiguation)
