= Structural acoustics =

Structural acoustics is the study of the mechanical waves in structures and how they interact with and radiate into adjacent media. The field of structural acoustics is often referred to as vibroacoustics in Europe and Asia. People that work in the field of structural acoustics are known as structural acousticians. The field of structural acoustics can be closely related to a number of other fields of acoustics including noise, transduction, underwater acoustics, and physical acoustics.

== Vibrations in structures ==
=== Compressional and shear waves (isotropic, homogeneous material) ===
Compressional waves (often referred to as longitudinal waves) expand and contract in the same direction (or opposite) as the wave motion. For one-dimensional problems, the wave equation dictates the motion of the wave in the x direction.

$${ \partial^2 u  \over  \partial x ^2 }   =  {1 \over c_L^2} { \partial^2 u  \over  \partial t ^2 }$$

where $u$ is the displacement and $c_L$ is the longitudinal wave speed. This has the same form as the acoustic wave equation in one-dimension. $c_L$ is determined by properties (bulk modulus $B$ and density $\rho$) of the structure according to

$${ c_L }   =  { \sqrt { B \over \rho } }$$

When two dimensions of the structure are small with respect to wavelength (commonly called a beam), the wave speed is dictated by Young's modulus $E$ instead of the $B$ and are consequently slower than in infinite media.

Shear waves occur due to the shear stiffness and follows a similar equation, but with the displacement occurring in the transverse direction, perpendicular to the wave motion.

$${ \partial^2 w  \over  \partial x ^2 }   =  {1 \over c_s^2} { \partial^2 w  \over  \partial t ^2 }$$

The shear wave speed is governed by the shear modulus $G$ which is less than $E$ and $B$, making shear waves slower than longitudinal waves.

=== Bending waves in beams and plates ===
Most sound radiation is caused by bending (or flexural) waves, that deform the structure transversely as they propagate. Bending waves are more complicated than compressional or shear waves and depend on material properties as well as geometric properties. They are also dispersive since different frequencies travel at different speeds.

=== Modeling vibrations ===
Finite element analysis can be used to predict the vibration of complex structures. A finite element computer program will assemble the mass, stiffness, and damping matrices based on the element geometries and material properties, and solve for the vibration response based on the loads applied.

$${ [ -\omega^2  \mathbf{M} + j \omega  \mathbf{B} + (1 + j \eta )  \mathbf{K} ] } { \mathbf{d}  =  \mathbf{F} }$$

== Sound-structure interaction ==
=== Fluid-structure Interaction ===
When a vibrating structure is in contact with a fluid, the normal particle velocities at the interface must be conserved (i.e. be equivalent). This causes some of the energy from the structure to escape into the fluid, some of which radiates away as sound, some of which stays near the structure and does not radiate away. For most engineering applications, the numerical simulation of fluid-structure interactions involved in vibro-acoustics may be achieved by coupling the Finite element method and the Boundary element method.

== See also ==
- Lamb wave
- Linear elasticity
- Noise control
- Surface acoustic wave
