= Tommy Dea =

Australian rules footballer, born 1908

Personal information
- Full name: Tommy Dea
- Born: 16 December 1908
- Died: 24 May 1986 (aged 77)
- Original team: Epping
- Height: 175 cm (5 ft 9 in)
- Weight: 69 kg (152 lb)

Playing career^{1}
Years	Club	Games (Goals)
1928–30	North Melbourne	35 (1)
- ^{1} Playing statistics correct to the end of 1930.

Tommy Dea (16 December 1908 – 24 May 1986) was an Australian rules footballer who played with North Melbourne in the Victorian Football League (VFL).
