= Body-in-Blue =

Body-in-blue is a term used in the automotive industry for the set of body parts of a car, comprising the windows and the sheet metal components that are welded or glued together before other areas of the car (such as the trim, the engine, the drivetrain, etc.) are joined to it on the production line. A body-in-blue completely encloses the interior car cavity.
