= Deborah V. Deas =

American psychiatrist and academic administrator

- Education: College of Charleston; University of South Carolina; Medical University of South Carolina
- Scientific career
- Fields: Psychiatry
- Workplaces: Medical University of South Carolina; University of California, Riverside

Deborah Victoria Deas is an American psychiatrist and academic administrator serving as the dean of the UC Riverside School of Medicine since 2016. She is a distinguished professor of psychiatry.

== Life ==
Deas is from Adams Run, South Carolina. She earned a B.S. in biology from the College of Charleston in 1978. She completed a M.P.H. from the University of South Carolina in 1979. In 1989, Deas received her M.D. from Medical University of South Carolina (MUSC). She completed an adult psychiatric residency (1992) and a child and adolescent psychiatric fellowship (1994) and an addiction psychiatry fellowship. She conducted a substance abuse research fellowship with the National Institute on Alcohol Abuse and Alcoholism.

Deas researches pharmacotherapy and psychosocial treatments in adults and adolescents with attention deficit hyperactivity disorder, anxiety disorders, and substance use disorders. Deas was the founding director of the MUSC adolescent substance abuse program. She also worked as the senior associate dean for medical education, chief academic officer, and senior associate dean for diversity and admissions. Deas was the interim dean of the college of medicine and a professor of psychiatry. In May 2016, Deas joined the University of California, Riverside as its vice chancellor for sciences. She is also the Mark and Pam Rubin dean of the UC Riverside School of Medicine and a distinguished professor of psychiatry. She was elected to the National Academy of Medicine in 2022. She is a fellow with the American College of Psychiatrists and the American College of Neuropsychopharmacology.
