= Malcolm Deas =

English historian (1941–2023)

Malcolm Douglas Deas, OBE (24 April 1941 – 29 July 2023) was an English historian specialising in the study of Latin America in general and Colombia in particular. During the 1960s, he co-founded the Latin American Centre at St. Antony's College with Sir Raymond Carr and served as its director on numerous occasions. His tenure at Oxford University spanned nearly five decades until his retirement in 2008. During this time, he played a key role in expanding the Latin American collections at the Bodleian Library and taught distinguished Colombian historians, including Margarita Garrido, Jorge Orlando Melo, Eduardo Posada Carbó and Marco Palacios.

== Biography ==
Malcolm Deas was born on 24 April 1941 in Charminster, Dorset, the son of Walter Malcolm Deas and Anne Findlay Pigé-Leschellas. His father died in 1946 whilst serving with the Royal Tank Regiment in Germany. He studied modern history at New College, Oxford, and went on to become a Fellow of All Souls College (1962 - 1966) and St Antony's College (1962 - 1966). He taught at Oxford University for nearly five decades until his retirement in 2008, as emeritus professor, while acting as one of the key figures at the Latin American Centre in Oxford, founded by Sir Raymond Carr in the 1960s.

In late 1963, Deas he embarked on his initial journeys to Colombia to delve into the early history of the Republic. During this first explorations, he collaborated with emerging historians like Luis Ospina Vásquez, Jaime Jaramillo Uribe, Germán Colmenares, and Jorge Orlando Melo. Since then Deas visited Colombia numerous times, residing there intermittently before acquiring Colombian nationality in 2008. His work appeared in publications such as New Statesman, The Listener, Spectator, London Review of Books, The Times, El Tiempo, and El Espectador.

Moreover, Deas was interested in Colombian literature and visual culture. According to the philosopher Sergio Jaramillo Caro, "Cómo se evapora un ejército" ["How an army evaporates"], by Ángel Cuervo, was one of his favorite books. As per the historian and politician Gustavo Bell Lemus, "although political history was the dominant theme of his academic production, he was also concerned with painting and photography as historical testimonies of the traditions of our people." For that, in 2010, he curated the exhibition "History of Colombia through Photography, 1842-2010" [Historia de Colombia a través de la fotografía, 1842 - 2010] at the Banco de la República, and he was also a regular visitor to second-hand bookstores in Bogotá, seeking old grammar texts written by grammarians such as Rufino José. Cuervo, and politicians like Miguel Antonio Caro, Santiago Pérez, Rafael Uribe Uribe, and José Manuel Marroquín.

In the words of Sergio Jaramillo Caro, "No one like him has brought to our attention the 'improbability of Colombia': "the fact that in isolated, vast, mountainous lands without ties to international trade, and therefore poor and with a 'hungry and meager' state, a Republic has taken root, and with all the difficulties, maintained a civilian government almost constantly and over time became a modern democracy."

In the context of the confrontation between the Colombian state and drug trafficking, particularly with Pablo Escobar Gaviria, between 1990 and 1994, Deas served as an advisor for the design of policies to reduce violence and strengthen security and defense during the administration of Colombian President César Gaviria Trujillo. His work there earned him the distinction of the Order of Boyacá and the Order of the British Empire. In addition, he was appointed as a member of the Order of Andrés Bello (Venezuela) and the Order of Merit (Ecuador). In 2008, he received an honorary doctorate from the University of the Andes in Bogotá, and Colombian citizenship. On that occasion, historian Gustavo Bell Lamus, then vice president of Colombia, referred to him as "a Colombian by knowledge, passion, and conviction.""

Moreover in 2008, during the government of Álvaro Uribe Vélez, he received the colombian nationality "for his outstanding academic contribution to the understanding of national reality". On that occasion, the Colombian economist Santiago Montenegro Trujillo referred to Deas as an "illustrious Colombian".

Malcolm Deas died on 29 July 2023, at the age of 82.
