= East Asian studies =

Field of scholarly enquiry and education

Chinese name
- Simplified Chinese: 东亚研究
- Traditional Chinese: 東亞研究
Transcriptions
Standard Mandarin
- Hanyu Pinyin: Dōngyà yánjiū
Yue: Cantonese
- Yale Romanization: Dūng A yìhngau

Korean name
- Hangul: 동아시아학
- Hanja: 東아시아學
Transcriptions
- Revised Romanization: Dongasiahak
- McCune–Reischauer: Tongasiahak

Japanese name
- Kanji: 東アジア研究
- Kana: ひがしあじあけんきゅう
Transcriptions
- Romanization: Higashi Ajia kenkyū

East Asian studies is a distinct multidisciplinary field of scholarly enquiry and education that promotes a broad humanistic understanding of East Asia past and present. The field includes the study of the region's culture, written language, history and political institutions.

East Asian studies is located within the broader field of Asian studies and is also interdisciplinary in character, incorporating elements of the social sciences (anthropology, economics, sociology, politics, etc.) and humanities (literature, history, art, film, music, etc.), among others. The field encourages scholars from diverse disciplines to exchanges ideas on scholarship as it relates to the East Asian experience and the experience of East Asia in the world. In addition, the field encourages scholars to educate others to have a deeper understanding of and appreciation and respect for, all that is East Asia and, therefore, to promote peaceful human integration worldwide.

At universities throughout North America and the Western world, the study of East Asian humanities is traditionally housed in EALC (East Asian Languages and Civilizations or East Asian Languages and Cultures), EALL (East Asian Languages and Literatures), EAS (East Asian Studies), as well as Asian Studies departments, which run majors in Chinese and Japanese language and literature and sometimes Korean language and literature.

East Asian studies programs, on the other hand, are typically interdisciplinary centers that bring together literary scholars, historians, anthropologists, sociologists, political scientists, etc. from their various departments and schools to promote instructional programs, conferences and lecture series of common interest. East Asian studies centers also often run interdisciplinary undergraduate and master's degree programs in East Asian studies.

== History ==
In universities across the United States, as part of the opposition to the Vietnam War in the 1960s, younger faculty and graduate students criticized the field for complicity in what they saw as American imperialism. In particular, the Committee of Concerned Asian Scholars debated and published alternative approaches not centered in the United States or funded, as many American programs were, by the American government or major foundations. They charged that Japan was held up as a model of non-revolutionary modernization and the field focused on modernization theory in order to fend off revolution.

In the following decades, many critics were inspired by Edward Said's 1978 book Orientalism, while others, writing from the point of view of the quantitative or theoretical social sciences, saw area studies in general and East Asian studies in particular, as amorphous and lacking in rigor.

Critiques were also mounted from other points in the political spectrum. Ramon H. Myers and Thomas A. Metzger, two scholars based at the generally conservative Hoover Institution, charged that "the 'revolution' paradigm increasingly overshadowed the 'modernization' paradigm" and "this fallacy has become integral to much of the writing on modern Chinese history", discrediting or ignoring other factors in the history of modern China.

In Europe, notable scholars of East Asian studies have long occupied professorships at prominent universities in the United Kingdom, Germany, the Netherlands, France and Italy, while recent publications also suggest that the "Nordic countries offer some unique contributions in the field of East Asian studies."

== Subfields ==
=== Sinology ===
The sub-field dedicated to China, Chinese history, Chinese culture, Chinese literature, and the Chinese language. In the context of the Republic of China also specified as Taiwan studies (Academia Sinica).

=== Japanology ===
The sub-field dedicated to Japan, Japanese culture, Japanese history, Japanese literature, and the Japanese language. The foundation of the Asiatic Society of Japan at Yokohama in 1872 by men such as Ernest Satow and Frederick Victor Dickins was an important event in the development of Japanese studies as an academic discipline.

=== Koreanology ===
The sub-field dedicated to Korea, Korean culture, Korean history, Korean literature, and the Korean language. The term Korean studies first began to be used in the 1940s, but did not attain widespread currency until South Korea rose to economic prominence in the 1970s. In 1991, the South Korean government established the Korea Foundation to promote Korean studies.

=== Mongolistics ===
The sub-field dedicated to Mongolia, Mongolian culture, Mongolian literature and the Mongolian language. Mongolian studies are also presented as a sub-field of the study of Inner Asia (as opposed to East Asia). The American Center for Mongolian Studies was founded in 2002.

=== Orient ===
In addition to the above, studies about the history of the Orient have mainly developed in Japan. Orient means areas in North Africa, Eurasia except Europe and islands around them because of chaos due to studies about the history of Greater China and Korea under the Tokugawa shogunate before 1868 and those about the Eastern world from the establishment of European-style high-educational institutions after that year.

The notion about Oriental history that was made between 1868 and 1945 did not spread on other East Asian areas including Korea as the colony of Japan. There have been some Japanese notable historians about Oriental history but they are less famous in other countries.

== Institutions ==
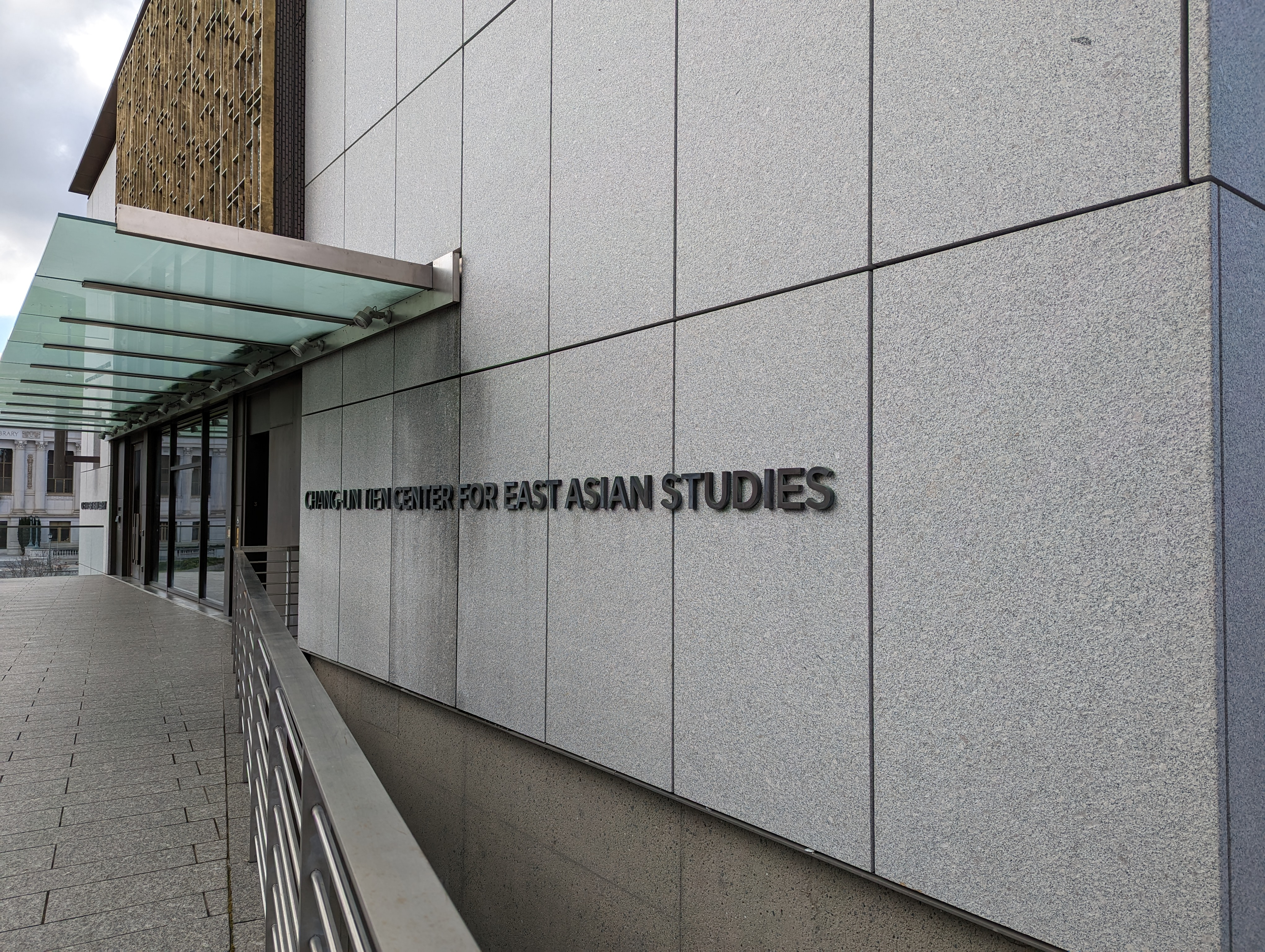
Chang-Lin Tien Center for East Asian Studies, UC Berkeley

=== North America ===
==== Canada ====
- University of Toronto: Department of East Asian Studies
- University of Alberta: East Asian Studies
- McGill University: Department of East Asian Studies
- York University: East Asian Studies

==== United States ====
- Brandeis University: East Asian Studies
- Stanford University: Center for East Asian Studies
- Yale University: East Asian studies
- Princeton University: Department of East Asian Studies
- Columbia University: East Asian Regional Studies
- Harvard University: East Asian Studies
- Johns Hopkins University: East Asian Studies
- University of Chicago: Center for East Asian Studies
- Brown University Department of East Asian Studies
- University of Southern California: Department of East Asian Languages and Cultures
- University of Pennsylvania: Department of East Asian Languages and Civilizations
- New York University: Department of East Asian Studies
- Indiana University Bloomington: East Asian Languages and Cultures
- Georgetown University: Department of East Asian Languages and Cultures
- University of Pittsburgh Department of East Asian Languages and Literatures
- University of Illinois Urbana-Champaign: Department of East Asian Languages and Cultures
- Washington University in St. Louis: Department of East Asian Languages and Cultures
- University at Albany: Department of East Asian Studies
- University of California, Berkeley: Department of East Asian Languages and Cultures
- University of California, Irvine: East Asian studies
- University of California, Davis: East Asian Studies
- University of Virginia: East Asia Center and East Asian Languages, Literatures and Cultures
- University of Maryland: Center for East Asian Studies
- University of Texas at Austin: Center for East Asian Studies
- George Washington University: Department of East Asian Languages and Literatures
- University of Arizona: Department of East Asian Studies
- University of Notre Dame: Department of East Asian Languages and Cultures
- University of Kansas: Center for East Asian Studies
- Wake Forest University: Department of East Asian Languages and Cultures
- Dickinson College: Department of East Asian Studies
- Ohio State University: East Asian Studies Center
- Oberlin College: Department of East Asian Studies
- Western Washington University: East Asian Studies

=== Asia ===
- National Taiwan Normal University: Department of East Asian Studies
- National Chengchi University: Institute of East Asian Studies
- University of Malaya: Department of East Asia Studies
- University of Delhi: Department of East Asian Studies, University of Delhi
- Jawaharlal Nehru University: Centre for East Asian Studies
- Tel Aviv University: Department of East Asia Studies

=== Europe ===
- SOAS University of London: Department of East Asian Languages and Cultures
- University of Cambridge: East Asian Studies
- University of Leeds: East Asian Studies
- Trinity College Dublin: Trinity Centre for Asian Studies
- University College Cork: Department of Asian Studies
- University College Dublin: UCD Centre for Asia-Pacific Research
- Comenius University Bratislava: Department of East Asian Studies
- Paris Cité University: School of East Asian Studies
- Heidelberg University: East Asian Studies
- University of Göttingen: Department of East Asia Studies
- University of Turku: Centre for East Asian Studies (CEAS)
- Vytautas Magnus University: Centre for Asian Studies

== Journals ==
- Asian Culture
- Asian Survey
- Bulletin of the School of Oriental and African Studies
- East Asian History
- Harvard Journal of Asiatic Studies
- Journal Asiatique
- Journal of American-East Asian Relations
- Journal of Asian Studies
- Journal of Chinese Religions
- Journal of Contemporary China
- Journal of East Asian Studies
- Late Imperial China
- Modern Asian Studies
- Modern China (journal)
- New Zealand Journal of Asian Studies
- Pacific Affairs
- The China Quarterly
- T'oung Pao

== See also ==
- Area studies
- List of academic disciplines
