= Lionel Deas =

English cricketer

Personal information
- Full name: Lionel Maury Ross Deas
- Born: 8 February 1872; Macclesfield, Derbyshire, England
- Died: 8 January 1913 (aged 40); Budleigh Salterton, Devon, England
- Batting: Unknown
- Bowling: Unknown

Domestic team information
- Years: Team
- 1895/96–1906/07: Europeans

Career statistics
| Competition | First-class |
|---|---|
| Matches | 9 |
| Runs scored | 86 |
| Batting average | 6.61 |
| 100s/50s | –/– |
| Top score | 31 |
| Balls bowled | 1,978 |
| Wickets | 46 |
| Bowling average | 14.45 |
| 5 wickets in innings | 4 |
| 10 wickets in match | 1 |
| Best bowling | 8/91 |
| Catches/stumpings | 15/– |
- Source: ESPNcricinfo, 20 November 2021

Lionel Maury Ross Deas (8 February 1872 – 8 January 1913) was an English first-class cricketer and an officer in both the British Army and the British Indian Army.

The son of Peter Maury Deas, a doctor, he was born at Macclesfield in February 1872. He attended the Royal Military College at Sandhurst, graduating into the King's Own Yorkshire Light Infantry as a second lieutenant in May 1892. Promotion to lieutenant followed in October 1893, Soon after he served in British India and was seconded to the Indian Staff Corps in September 1896. While in British India he played first-class cricket for the Europeans cricket team between 1895 and 1906, making nine appearances. A skilled bowler, he took 46 wickets in his nine first-class matches at an average of 14.45. He took a five wicket haul on four occasions and took ten wickets in a match once, with his best innings bowling figures being 8 for 91. He notably dismissed the Test cricketer Ranjitsinhji for ducks in both innings in a minor match while playing for Pune Gymkhana on a pitch described as "soaked by heavy rain".

Deas saw action during the Boxer Rebellion with the Indian Supply and Transport Corps, during which he was mentioned in dispatches in May 1901 for his command of a Commissariat Depot at Tungchou. He participated in the American–led China Relief Expedition during the conflict, for which he was made a member of the Military Order of the Dragon. Holding the rank of captain by 1902, he was appointed a special service officer in the British Indian Army in October of that year. He was made a brevet major in September 1904 in recognition of his service in the Somaliland campaign against the Dervishes led by Diiriye Guure. later gaining the rank in full in May 1910. Deas later returned to England, where he died in Devon at Budleigh Salterton in January 1913.
