= Larsen v Rick Dees Ltd =

Larsen v Rick Dees Limited
- Court: Supreme Court of New Zealand
- Full case name: Brett Ronald Larsen v Rick Dees Limited
- Decided: 2 June 2006
- Citation: [2006] NZSC 36
- Transcript: http://jdo.justice.govt.nz/jdo/Search.jsp

Court membership
- Judges sitting: Elias CJ, Blanchard and Tipping JJ

Brett Larsen v Rick Dees Ltd is a decision of the Supreme Court of New Zealand issued on 1 June 2007. It considered whether a contract for purchase of land is validly completed where settled with a transfer of funds electronically within the time limit stipulated by the parties while notification of this transfer was out of time.

== Composition of the Court ==
Elias CJ, Blanchard, Tipping, McGrath and Gault JJ. The decision of the court was read by Blanchard J, giving the judgement of McGrath J, Gault J, Tipping J (who delivered some observations of his own) and himself. Elias CJ dissented.

== Background ==
Mr. Larsen agreed to sell ten housing units in Papakura to Rick Dees Ltd.

== Dissent ==
Elias CJ delivered a brief dissent. She believed that the purchaser's sole duty under the contract was to give the purchase price of the land prior to the time stipulated. She believed that where the purchaser was directed by the vendor to settle funds by a certain time and does so, settlement is complete and is not reliant on notification of the vendor.

The vendor's letter requesting electronic transfer and delaying what was to be a concurrent surrender of the title documents until notification of the receipt of the funds was made by the purchaser was to the vendor's advantage. Performance of the deed requested constituted acceptance by the purchaser that he was waiving his right to have the vendor's strict contractual obligation performed. It did not import a further obligation on the purchaser regarding the method of settlement.

Elias CJ rejected the suggestion that notification was necessary for commercial efficacy, especially regarding the possibility that a vendor may require certainty regarding back-to-back deals of sale and purchase. Here the vendor asked for the electronic transfer of funds. They had established by when the funds needed to be transferred. They provided the deposit slip. They had the funds in their account prior to this time. Through the agency of their bank, they had received the funds. They had certainty of actual receipt.

For Elias CJ, the judgment of the majority meant a secure full payment of purchase monies within the time required and in accordance with the method requested by the vendor would be artificially deemed incomplete because the vendor was difficult to locate. In her mind this decision would result in a far greater degree of commercial uncertainty and unreality than finding the settlement to be valid.
