= Arval Brethren =

Ancient Roman college of priests

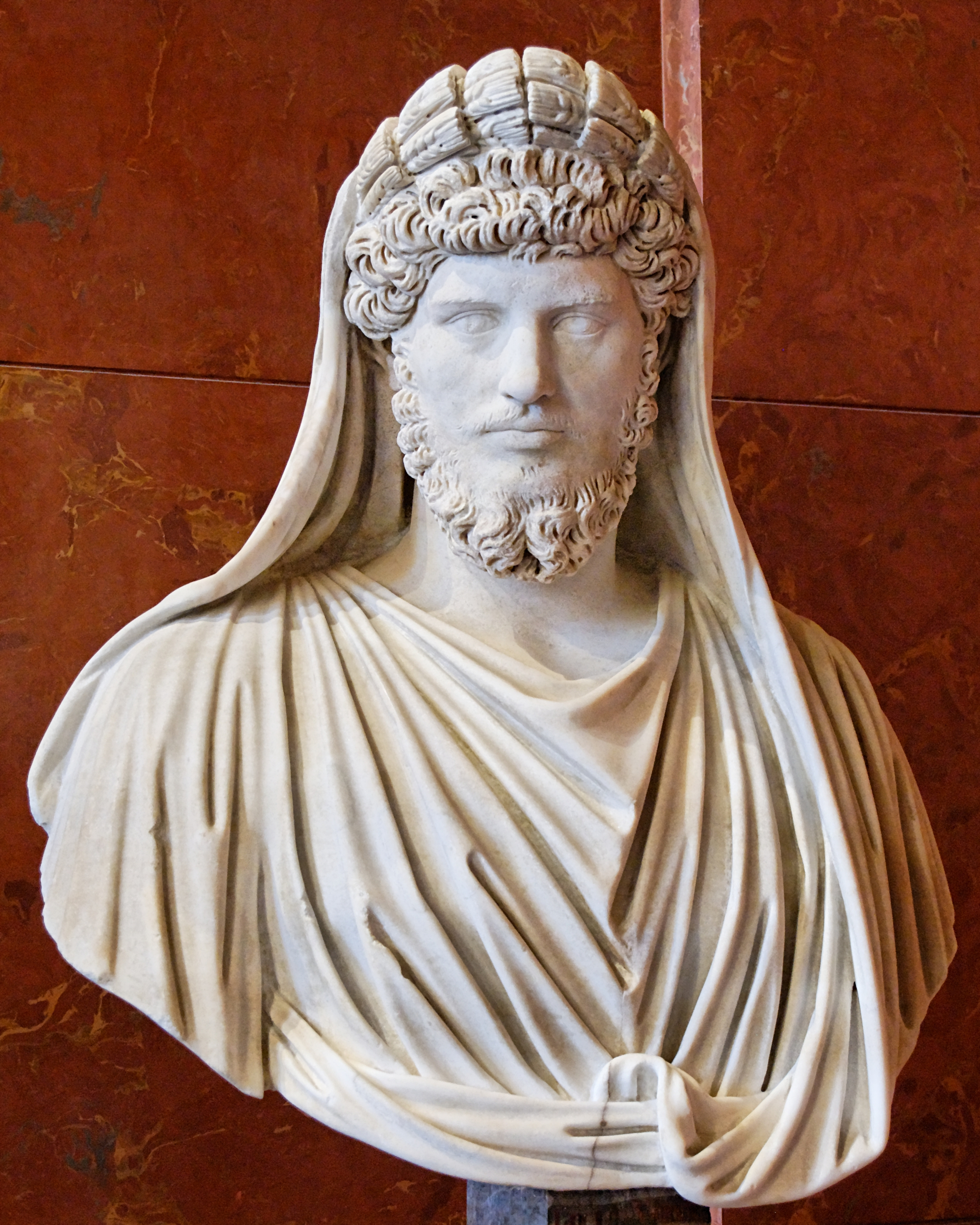
Portrait of the emperor Lucius Verus as an Arval Brother (ca. 160 AD)

In ancient Roman religion, the Arval Brethren (Latin: Fratres Arvales, "Brothers of the Fields") or Arval Brothers were a body of priests who offered annual sacrifices to the Lares and gods to guarantee good harvests. Inscriptions provide evidence of their oaths, rituals and sacrifices.

== Origin ==
Roman legend held that the priestly college was originated by Romulus, first king of Rome, who took the place of a dead son of his nurse Acca Laurentia, and formed the priesthood with the remaining eleven sons. They were also connected originally with the Sabine priesthood of Sodales Titii who were probably originally their counterpart among the Sabines. Thus, it can be inferred that they existed before the founding of the city. There is further proof of the high antiquity of the college in the verbal forms of the song with which, down to late times, a part of the ceremonies was accompanied, and which is still preserved. They persisted to the imperial period.

== Structure and duties ==
The Arval Brethren formed a college of twelve priests, although archaeologists have found only up to nine names at a time in the inscriptions. They were appointed for life and did not lose their status even in exile. According to Pliny the Elder, their sign was a white band with the chaplet of sheaves of grain (Naturalis Historia 18.2).

The Brethren assembled in the Regia. Their task was the worship of Dea Dia, an old fertility goddess, possibly an aspect of Maia or Ceres. On the three days of her May festival, they offered sacrifices and chanted secretly the Carmen Arvale inside the temple of the goddess, at her lucus. The magister (master) of the college selected the exact three days of the celebration by an unknown method.

The celebration began in Rome on the first day, was transferred to a sacred grove outside the city wall on the second day and ended back in the city on the third day. Their duties included ritual propitiations or thanksgivings such as the Ambarvalia, the sacrifices done at the borders of Rome at the fifth mile of the Via Campana or the Salaria (a place now on the hill Monte delle Piche at Magliana Vecchia on the right bank of the Tiber). Before the sacrifice, the sacrificial victim was led three times around a grain field where a chorus of farmers and farm-servants danced and sang praises for Ceres and offered her libations of milk, honey and wine.

Archaic traits of the rituals included the prohibition of the use of iron, the use of the olla terrea (a jar made of unbaked earth) and of the sacrificial burner of Dea Dia made of silver and adorned with grassy clods.

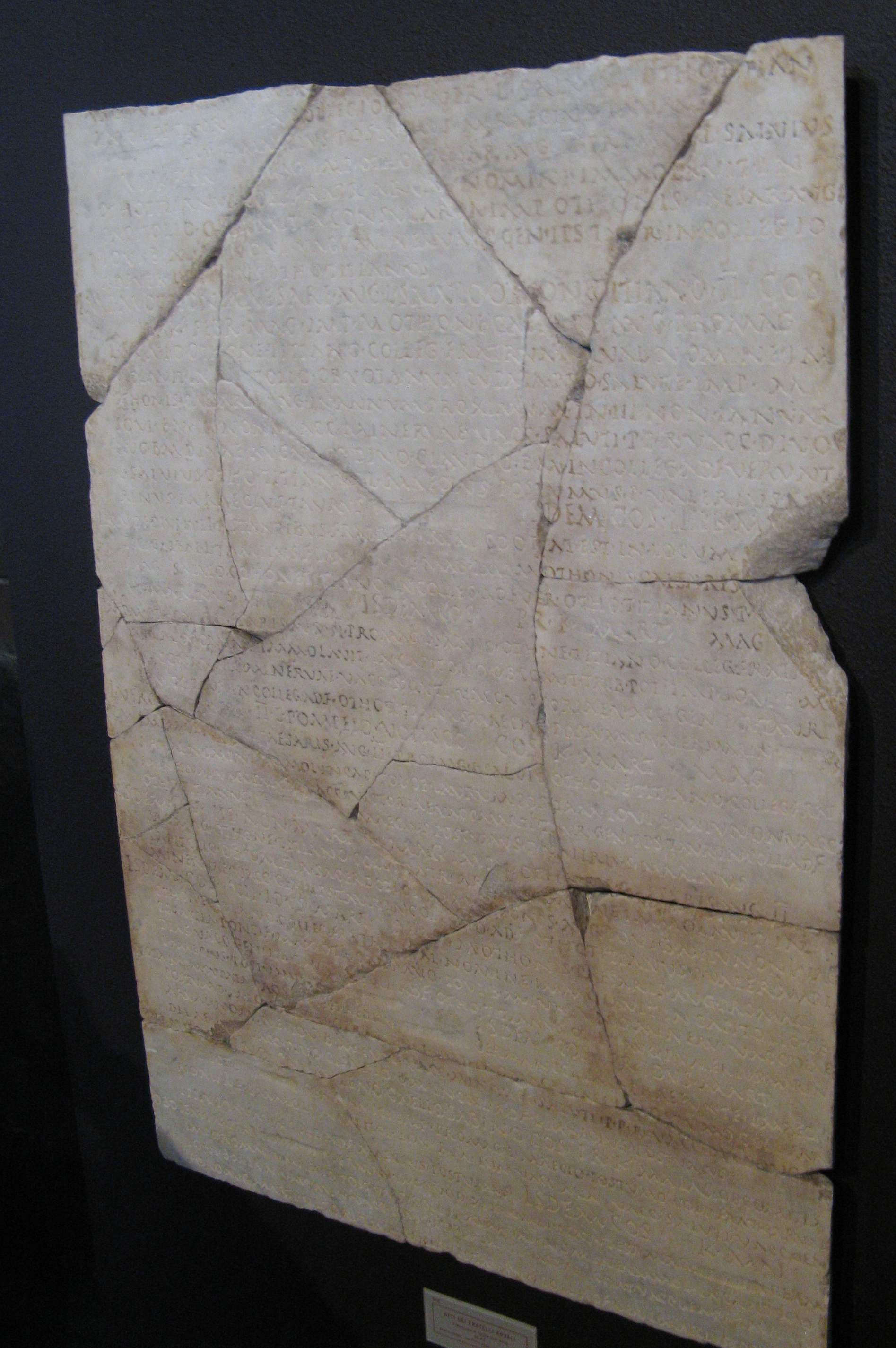
1st-century inscription of the Acta Arvalium

== Restoration of the priesthood ==
The importance of Arval Brethren apparently dwindled during the Roman Republic, but emperor Augustus revived their practices to enforce his own authority. In his time the college consisted of a master (magister), a vice-master (promagister), a priest (flamen), and a praetor, with eight ordinary members, attended by various servants, and in particular by four chorus boys, sons of senators whose parents were both alive. Each wore a wreath of corn, a white fillet, and the toga praetexta. The election of members was by co-optation on the motion of the president, who, with a flamen, was himself elected for one year.

After Augustus, emperors and senators frequented the festivities. At least two emperors, Marcus Aurelius and Elagabalus, were formally accepted as members of the Brethren. The first full descriptions of their rituals also originate from this period.

It is clear that, while the members were themselves always persons of distinction, the duties of their office were held in high respect. And yet no mention of them occurs in the writings of Cicero or Livy, and literary allusions to them are very scarce. On the other hand, there are extant, long series of the acta or minutes of their proceedings, drawn up by themselves, and inscribed on stone. Excavations, between the 16th century and the 19th, in the grove of the Dea Dia, yielded 96 of these records from 14 to 241 AD. The last inscriptions (Acta Arvalia) about the Arval Brethren date from about 325 AD.
