= Statistical energy analysis =

Statistical energy analysis (SEA) is a method for predicting the transmission of sound and vibration through complex structural acoustic systems. The method is particularly well suited for quick system level response predictions at the early design stage of a product, and for predicting responses at higher frequencies. In SEA a system is represented in terms of a number of coupled subsystems and a set of linear equations are derived that describe the input, storage, transmission and dissipation of energy within each subsystem. The parameters in the SEA equations are typically obtained by making certain statistical assumptions about the local dynamic properties of each subsystem (similar to assumptions made in room acoustics and statistical mechanics). These assumptions significantly simplify the analysis and make it possible to analyze the response of systems that are often too complex to analyze using other methods (such as finite element and boundary element methods).

== History ==
The initial derivation of SEA arose from independent calculations made in 1959 by Richard Lyon and Preston Smith as part of work concerned with the development of methods for analyzing the response of large complex aerospace structures subjected to spatially distributed random loading. Lyon's calculation showed that under certain conditions, the flow of energy between two coupled oscillators is proportional to the difference in the oscillator energies (suggesting a thermal analogy exists in structural-acoustic systems). Smith's calculation showed that a structural mode and a diffuse reverberant sound field attain a state of 'equipartition of energy' as the damping of the mode is reduced (suggesting a state of thermal equilibrium can exist in structural-acoustic systems). The extension of the two oscillator results to more general systems is often referred to as the modal approach to SEA. While the modal approach provides physical insights into the mechanisms that govern energy flow it involves assumptions that have been the subject of considerable debate over many decades. The theory that combines deterministic finite element methods (FEM) and SEA was developed by Phil Shorter and Robin Langley and is called hybrid FEM/SEA theory. In recent years, alternative derivations of the SEA equations based on wave approaches have become available. Such derivations form the theoretical foundation behind a number of modern commercial SEA codes and provide a general framework for calculating the parameters in an SEA model. A number of methods also exist for post-processing FE models to obtain estimates of SEA parameters. Lyon mentioned the use of such methods in his initial SEA text book in 1975 but a number of alternative derivations have been presented over the years

== Method ==
To solve a noise and vibration problem with SEA, the system is partitioned into a number of components (such as plates, shells, beams and acoustic cavities) that are coupled together at various junctions. Each component can support a number of different propagating wavetypes (for example, the bending, longitudinal and shear wavefields in a thin isotropic plate). From an SEA point of view, the reverberant field of each wavefield represents an orthogonal store of energy and so is represented as a separate energy degree of freedom in the SEA equations.

The energy storage capacity of each reverberant field is described by a parameter termed the 'modal density', which depends on the average speed with which waves propagate energy through the subsystem (the average group velocity), and the overall dimension of the subsystem.

The transmission of energy between different wavefields at a given type of junction is described by parameters termed 'coupling loss factors'. Each coupling loss factor describes the input power to the direct field of a given receiving subsystem per unit energy in the reverberant field of a particular source subsystem.

The coupling loss factors are typically calculated by considering the way in which waves are scattered at different types of junctions (for example, point, line and area junctions). Strictly, SEA predicts the average response of a population or ensemble of systems and so the coupling loss factors and modal densities represent ensemble average quantities.

To simplify the calculation of the coupling loss factors it is often assumed that there is significant scattering within each subsystem (when viewed across an ensemble) so that direct field transmission between multiple connections to the same subsystem is negligible and reverberant transmission dominates. In practical terms, this means that SEA is often best suited for problems in which each subsystem is large compared with a wavelength (or from a modal point of view, each subsystem contains several modes in a given frequency band of interest).

The SEA equations contain a relatively small number of degrees of freedom and so can be easily inverted to find the reverberant energy in each subsystem due to a given set of external input powers. The (ensemble average) sound pressure levels and vibration velocities within each subsystem can then be obtained by superimposing the direct and reverberant fields within each subsystem.

== Applications ==
Over the past half century, SEA has found applications in virtually every industry for which noise and vibration are of concern. Typical applications include:

- Interior noise prediction and sound package design in automotive, aircraft, rotorcraft and train applications
- Interior and exterior radiated noise in marine applications
- Prediction of dynamic environments in launch vehicles and spacecraft
- Prediction of noise from consumer goods such as dishwashers, washing machines and refrigerators
- Prediction of noise from generators and industrial chillers
- Prediction of air-borne and structure-borne noise through buildings
- Design of enclosures etc.

Additional examples can be found in the proceedings of conferences such as INTERNOISE, NOISECON, EURONOISE, ICSV, NOVEM, SAE N&V.

== Software implementations ==
Several commercial solutions for Statistical Energy Analysis are available:

- Actran SEA Module from Free Field Technologies, MSC Software,
- VA One SEA Module (previously AutoSEA) from ESI Group, France
- SEAM, SEAM 3D from Cambridge Collaborative Inc. USA, since April 2019 under Altair Hyperworks.
- wave6 from Dassault Systèmes SIMULIA
- GSSEA-Light from Gothenburg Sound AB, Sweden
- SEA+ from InterAC, France distributed by LMS International

Free solutions:

- Statistical Energy Analysis Freeware,
- SEAlab - open code in Matlab/Octave from Applied Acoustics, Chalmers, Sweden (open source)
- pyva - python toolbox for vibroacoustic simulation, Germany (open source)
