= James Deas =

James Deas may refer to:

- James Deas (politician) (1891–1963), New Zealand politician
- James Deas (engineer) (1827–1899), Scottish harbour engineer
- Yank Deas (born James Alvin Deas; 1895–1972), American baseball player
