= David Deas (Royal Navy officer) =

Scottish medical officer in the Royal Navy

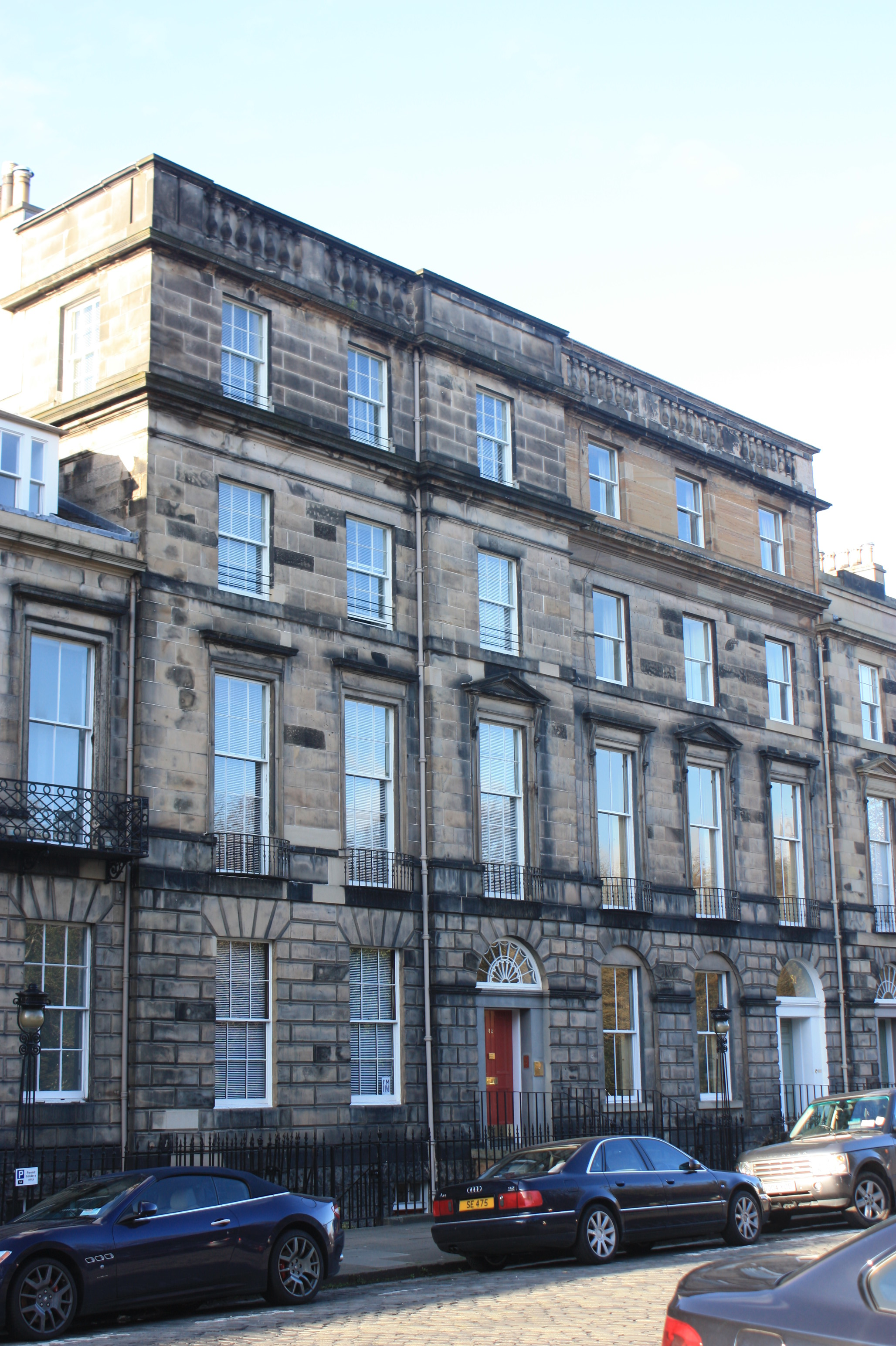
32 Heriot Row, Edinburgh where David Deas died

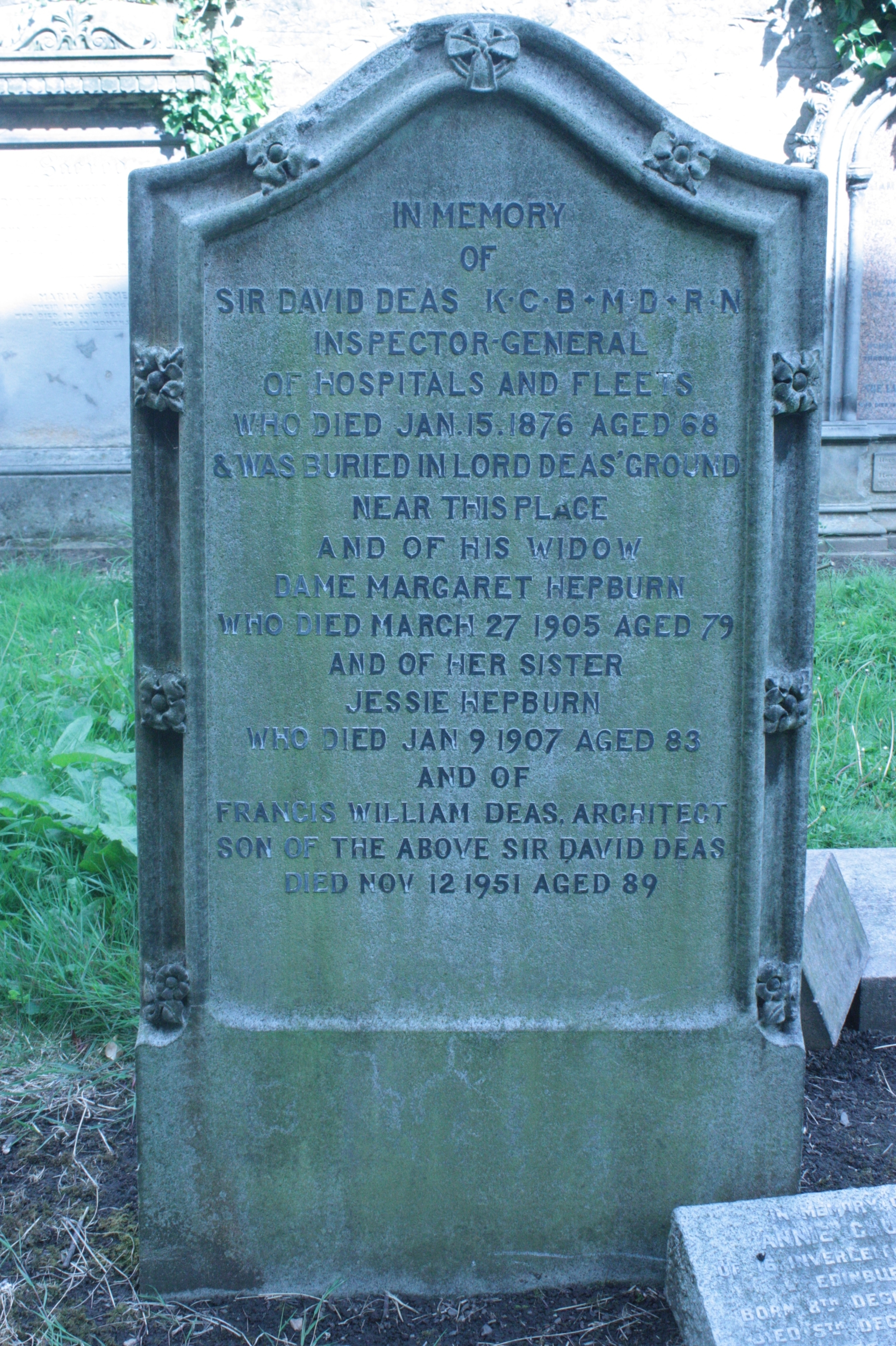
Sir David Deas' grave, Warriston Cemetery

Sir David Deas KCB (7 October 1807 – 15 January 1876) was a Scottish medical officer in the Royal Navy.

== Life ==
Deas was born in Falkland, Fife. He was the son of Francis Deas (died 1857), provost of Falkland, and his wife Margaret Moyes, daughter of David Moyes. Deas was educated at the high school in Edinburgh and then studied medicine at the University of Edinburgh. He became a licentiate of the Royal College of Surgeons of Edinburgh in 1827, and entered the Royal Navy on 7 June 1828 as an assistant surgeon.

He saw much service, and was promoted to be a surgeon 2 July 1836, and before his return to England in 1842 took part in the operations on the coast of Syria. He was advanced to the rank of deputy-inspector of hospitals and fleets 24 June 1854, and in the Britannia was present at the engagement with the sea defences of Sebastopol on 17 October. On 1 March 1855 he was gazetted inspector-general and served in the Royal Albert until the conclusion of the war with Russia.

From June 1857 until 1859 he had medical charge of the fleet on the coast of China, and his attention to the sick and wounded at the capture of Canton 28/29 December 1857 gained for him special mention. He continued in active service until March 1872, when he was placed on the retired list.

He was created Companion of the Bath (C.B.) 5 February 1856, and Knight Commander of the Bath (K.C.B.) on 13 March 1867, and awarded a good-service pension 11 April 1869. He held the Syrian Medal, the Crimea Medal with Sebastopol clasp, and the Turkish Crimea Medal, was a knight of the French Legion of Honour, and wore the Ottoman Order of the Medjidie, fourth class.

He married in July 1860 Margaret, daughter of William Hepburn.

He died at the residence of his brother, Sir George Deas, Lord Deas, 32 Heriot Row, Edinburgh, 15 January 1876, and was buried in the Warriston Cemetery, Edinburgh, on 19 January, close to the east wall near the old East Gate (now sealed). His son, the architect Francis William Deas, is buried with him. His brother George Deas, Lord Deas lies buried against the wall behind him.
