= George Deas, Lord Deas =

Scottish judge (1804–1887)

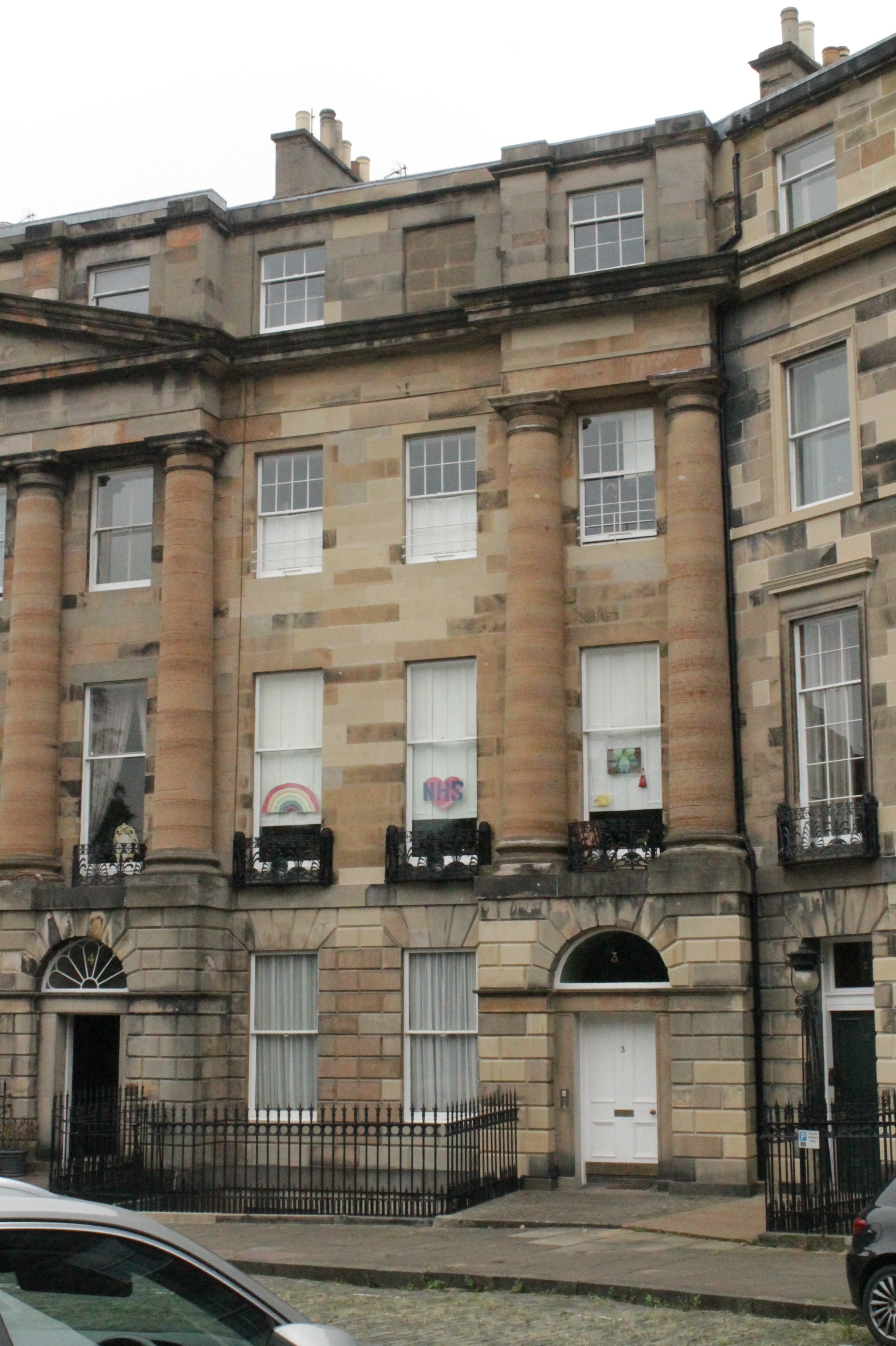
3 Moray Place

Sir George Deas, Lord Deas (1804–1887) was a 19th century Scottish judge.

== Life ==
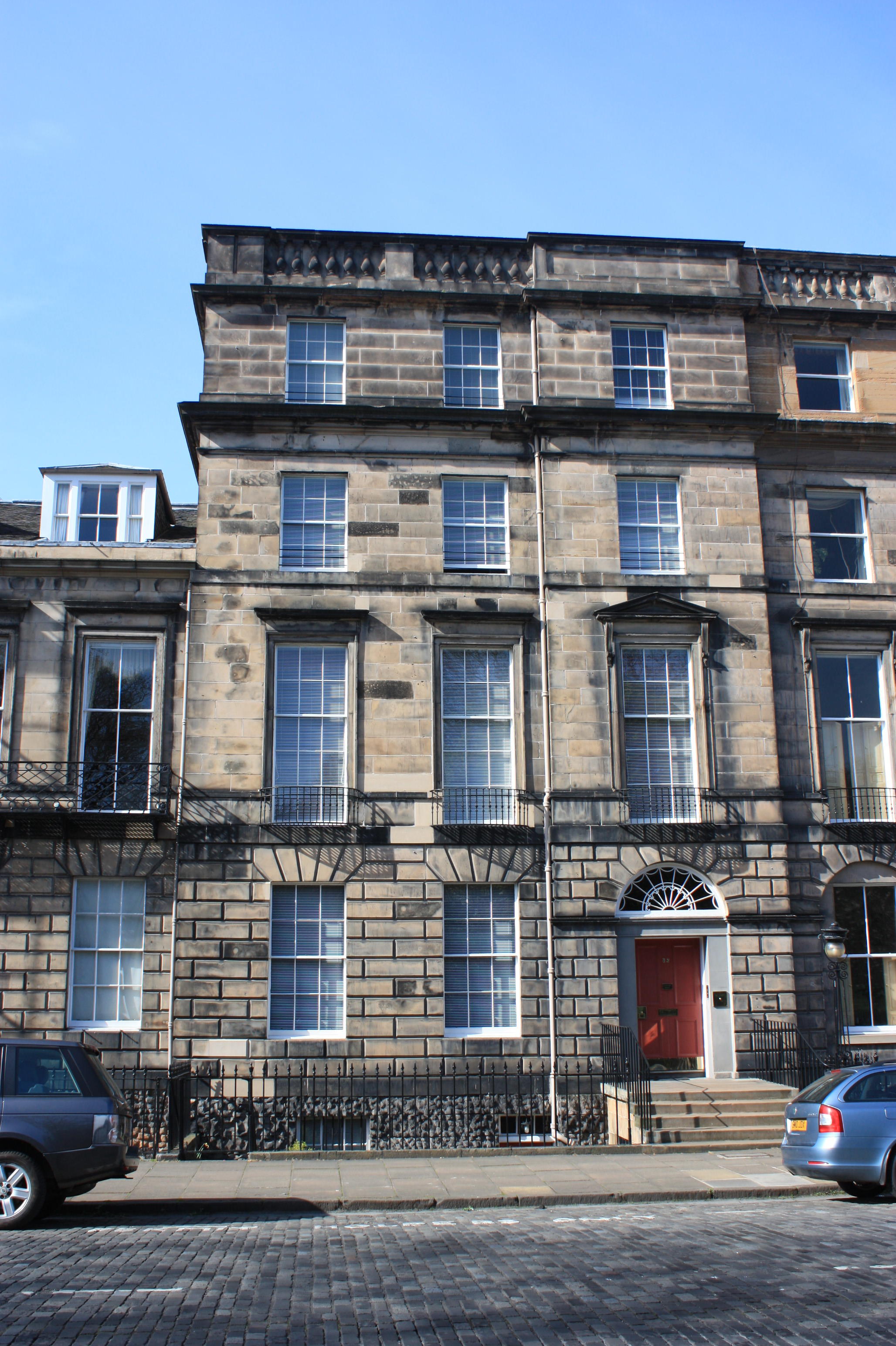
Lord Deas' huge townhouse at 32 Heriot Row, Edinburgh

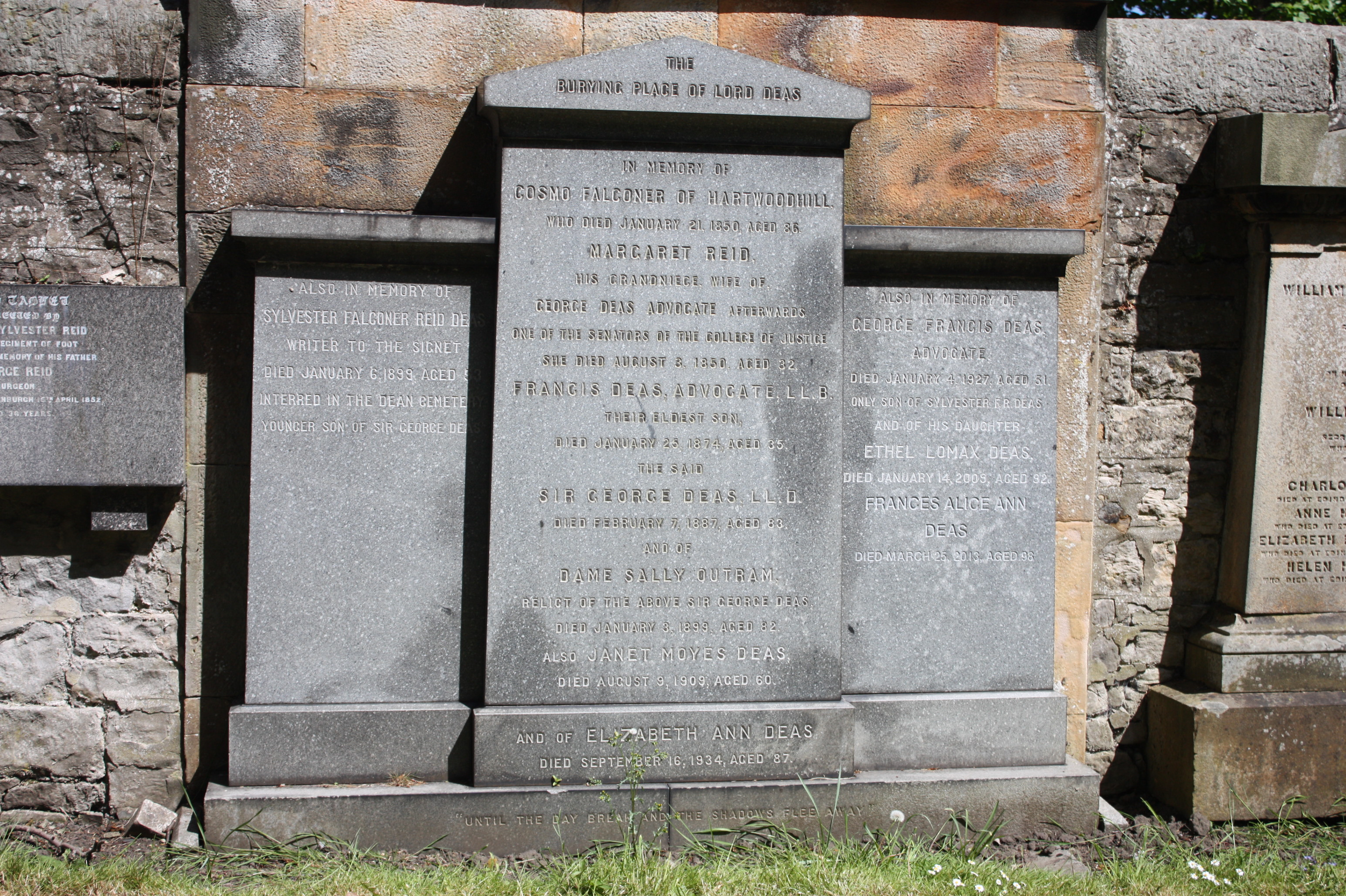
The grave of Sir George Deas, Warriston Cemetery

Deas, son was born in 1804. Sir David Deas, naval medical officer, was his brother. He acquired the rudiments of knowledge in various schools in Falkland, Milnathort in Kinross, and Perth, and in 1817 entered a writer's office in Perth. Having spent some time there, and also in the office of a writer in Cupar, he came to Edinburgh, where he pursued his legal studies, and also attended various classes at the University of Edinburgh obtaining prizes in logic, metaphysics, moral philosophy, and law.

He was called to the Scottish bar in 1828, where he soon acquired considerable practice. In 1833, "George Deas, advocate", is listed as living at 33 Scotland Street in Edinburgh's New Town, ground floor and basement accommodation in a high quality tenement.

In 1840 he received the appointment of Advocate depute, an office to which he was reappointed in 1846, and which he held until 1850. He was made Sheriff of Ross and Cromarty in 1850 and Solicitor General for Scotland from 1851. He was created a permanent lord ordinary of the court of session, with the judicial title of Lord Deas, and a judge of exchequer in May 1853, and a Lord Commissioner of Justiciary in April 1854. He was knighted in 1858. He resigned his judicial roles in 1885

As an advocate he was distinguished rather by strong logical faculty than by eloquence. He proved himself an acute and painstaking judge; and though he was seldom deterred from making a caustic remark by the fear of giving pain, his disposition is said to have been kindly. He spoke with a broad Scots accent.

He was the Judge who presided over the case of Mary Timney, the last woman publicly hanged in Scotland.

Deas married, first, in 1838, Margaret, only daughter of Sylvester Reid, and secondly, in 1857, the widow of Sir Benjamin Fonseca Outram, CB, MD.

Pittendreich House, Lasswade, was built in 1857 for Deas, and he also owned Hartwoodhill estate in North Lanarkshire. In 1860 he lived at 3 Moray Place on the Moray Estate in Edinburgh.

He died on 7 February 1887 at his residence, 32 Heriot Row, Edinburgh.

He is buried against the east wall of Warriston Cemetery in north Edinburgh, near the sealed northern gate. With him lie his wife, Dame Sally Outram (1818–1899) and son, Francis Deas FRSE (1839–1874) an advocate and amateur microscopist.

== Arms ==
Coat of arms of George Deas, Lord Deas

Crest
Out of a ducal coronet a demi-ostrich wings endorsed Proper.
Escutcheon
Argent three chevrons interlaced.

Legal offices
Preceded by John Cowan	Solicitor General for Scotland; 1851-2	Succeeded by John Inglis
