= 1900 VFL season =

Fourth season of the Victorian Football League (VFL)

1900 VFL premiership season
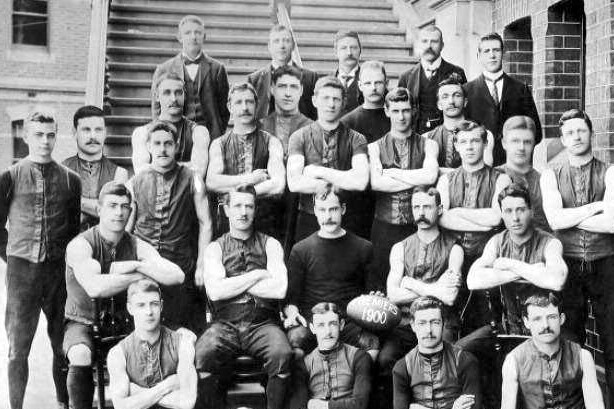
- Melbourne 1900 VFL premiership team
- Date: 5 May – 22 September 1900
- Teams: 8
- Premiers: Melbourne; 1st premiership
- Minor premiers: Fitzroy; 2nd minor premiership
- Leading goalkicker medallist: Teddy Lockwood (Geelong); Albert Thurgood (Essendon); 24 goals
- Matches played: 70

The 1900 VFL season was the fourth season of the Victorian Football League (VFL), the highest-level senior Australian rules football competition in Victoria. The season featured eight clubs and ran from 5 May to 22 September, comprising a 14-round home-and-away season followed by a finals series featuring all eight clubs.

Melbourne won the premiership, defeating Fitzroy by four points in the 1900 VFL grand final; it was Melbourne's first VFL premiership. Fitzroy won its second consecutive minor premiership by finishing atop the home-and-away ladder with an 11–3 win–loss record. Geelong's Teddy Lockwood and Essendon's Albert Thurgood tied for the leading goalkicker medal as the league's leading goalkickers.

== Background ==
In 1900, the VFL competition consisted of eight teams of 18 on-the-field players each, with no "reserves", although any of the 18 players who had left the playing field for any reason could later resume their place on the field at any time during the match.

Each team played each other twice in a home-and-away season of 14 rounds.

Once the 14 round home-and-away season had finished, the 1900 VFL Premiers were determined by the specific format and conventions of the 1898 VFL finals system.

== Home-and-away season ==
=== Round 1 ===
	Round 1
Saturday, 05 May (3:00 pm)	Carlton 2.6 (18)	def. by	Geelong 4.11 (35)	Princes Park
Saturday, 05 May (3:00 pm)	Collingwood 10.7 (67)	def.	Fitzroy 6.10 (46)	Victoria Park
Saturday, 05 May (3:00 pm)	Essendon 12.10 (82)	def.	South Melbourne 4.2 (26)	East Melbourne Cricket Ground
Saturday, 05 May (3:00 pm)	St Kilda 10.8 (68)	def.	Melbourne 9.13 (67)	Junction Oval
The Saints won their first ever VFL/AFL match after losing 48 consecutive matches; however, this was their only win of the season, and it was only realised a week later due to protest.; The St Kilda game marked the debut of Claude Clough, who, at 15 years and 209 days, is the youngest-ever VFL/AFL debutant; however, due to a historical clerical error, it wasn't until 2012 that this record was discovered.

=== Round 2 ===
	Round 2
Saturday, 12 May (3:00 pm)	Fitzroy 4.10 (34)	def.	Carlton 1.4 (10)	Brunswick Street Oval
Saturday, 12 May (3:00 pm)	Geelong 7.15 (57)	def.	Collingwood 5.5 (35)	Corio Oval
Saturday, 12 May (3:00 pm)	Melbourne 5.4 (34)	def.	Essendon 2.6 (18)	Melbourne Cricket Ground
Saturday, 12 May (3:00 pm)	South Melbourne 6.21 (57)	def.	St Kilda 3.7 (25)	Lake Oval

=== Round 4 ===
	Round 4
Wednesday, 23 May (3:00 pm)	Essendon 13.7 (85)	def.	Collingwood 2.4 (16)	East Melbourne Cricket Ground
Thursday, 24 May (3:00 pm)	St Kilda 2.6 (18)	def. by	Carlton 3.9 (27)	Junction Oval
Thursday, 24 May (3:00 pm)	Fitzroy 6.19 (55)	def.	South Melbourne 3.4 (22)	Brunswick Street Oval
Thursday, 24 May (3:00 pm)	Geelong 11.15 (81)	def.	Melbourne 2.3 (15)	Corio Oval

=== Round 5 ===
	Round 5
Saturday, 26 May (3:00 pm)	Carlton 2.6 (18)	def. by	Essendon 3.5 (23)	Princes Park
Saturday, 26 May (3:00 pm)	Collingwood 9.11 (65)	def.	St Kilda 2.7 (19)	Victoria Park
Saturday, 26 May (3:00 pm)	Melbourne 3.9 (27)	def. by	Fitzroy 10.6 (66)	Melbourne Cricket Ground
Saturday, 26 May (3:00 pm)	South Melbourne 5.7 (37)	def.	Geelong 3.5 (23)	Lake Oval

=== Round 6 ===
	Round 6
Saturday, 2 June (3:00 pm)	Carlton 4.1 (25)	def.	Collingwood 0.9 (9)	Princes Park
Saturday, 2 June (3:00 pm)	St Kilda 2.6 (18)	def. by	Essendon 3.11 (29)	Junction Oval
Saturday, 2 June (3:00 pm)	Fitzroy 6.10 (46)	def.	Geelong 1.6 (12)	Brunswick Street Oval
Saturday, 2 June (3:00 pm)	South Melbourne 6.8 (44)	def.	Melbourne 6.5 (41)	Lake Oval

=== Round 7 ===
	Round 7
Saturday, 9 June (3:00 pm)	South Melbourne 4.6 (30)	def.	Carlton 2.6 (18)	Lake Oval
Saturday, 9 June (3:00 pm)	Melbourne 8.18 (66)	def.	Collingwood 5.7 (37)	Melbourne Cricket Ground
Saturday, 9 June (3:00 pm)	Geelong 8.5 (53)	def.	Essendon 4.7 (31)	Corio Oval
Saturday, 9 June (3:00 pm)	Fitzroy 16.20 (116)	def.	St Kilda 2.5 (17)	Brunswick Street Oval

=== Round 8 ===
	Round 8
Saturday, 23 June (3:00 pm)	Geelong 5.9 (39)	def.	Carlton 3.13 (31)	Corio Oval
Saturday, 23 June (3:00 pm)	Fitzroy 6.6 (42)	def.	Collingwood 2.8 (20)	Brunswick Street Oval
Saturday, 23 June (3:00 pm)	South Melbourne 4.14 (38)	def.	Essendon 1.4 (10)	Lake Oval
Saturday, 23 June (3:00 pm)	Melbourne 15.18 (108)	def.	St Kilda 4.5 (29)	Melbourne Cricket Ground

=== Round 9 ===
	Round 9
Saturday, 30 June (3:00 pm)	Carlton 2.3 (15)	def. by	Fitzroy 7.11 (53)	Princes Park
Saturday, 30 June (3:00 pm)	Collingwood 6.6 (42)	def.	Geelong 3.5 (23)	Victoria Park
Saturday, 30 June (3:00 pm)	Essendon 2.6 (18)	def. by	Melbourne 6.8 (44)	East Melbourne Cricket Ground
Saturday, 30 June (3:00 pm)	St Kilda 1.5 (11)	def. by	South Melbourne 5.22 (52)	Junction Oval

=== Round 10 ===
	Round 10
Saturday, 7 July (3:00 pm)	Melbourne 9.14 (68)	def.	Carlton 5.3 (33)	Melbourne Cricket Ground
Saturday, 7 July (3:00 pm)	South Melbourne 3.8 (26)	def.	Collingwood 2.12 (24)	Lake Oval
Saturday, 7 July (3:00 pm)	Fitzroy 7.12 (54)	def.	Essendon 5.10 (40)	Brunswick Street Oval
Saturday, 7 July (3:00 pm)	Geelong 13.8 (86)	def.	St Kilda 4.4 (28)	Corio Oval

=== Round 11 ===
	Round 11
Saturday, 14 July (3:00 pm)	Carlton 7.7 (49)	def.	St Kilda 4.4 (28)	Princes Park
Saturday, 14 July (3:00 pm)	Collingwood 6.14 (50)	def.	Essendon 4.5 (29)	Victoria Park
Saturday, 14 July (3:00 pm)	South Melbourne 4.9 (33)	def. by	Fitzroy 5.9 (39)	Lake Oval
Saturday, 14 July (3:00 pm)	Melbourne 4.16 (40)	def.	Geelong 4.5 (29)	Melbourne Cricket Ground

=== Round 12 ===
	Round 12
Saturday, 28 July (3:00 pm)	Essendon 12.12 (84)	def.	Carlton 5.5 (35)	East Melbourne Cricket Ground
Saturday, 28 July (3:00 pm)	St Kilda 3.5 (23)	def. by	Collingwood 6.12 (48)	Junction Oval
Saturday, 28 July (3:00 pm)	Fitzroy 8.9 (57)	def.	Melbourne 4.8 (32)	Brunswick Street Oval
Saturday, 28 July (3:00 pm)	Geelong 10.10 (70)	def.	South Melbourne 3.6 (24)	Corio Oval

=== Round 13 ===
	Round 13
Saturday, 4 August (3:00 pm)	Collingwood 14.12 (96)	def.	Carlton 4.4 (28)	Victoria Park
Saturday, 4 August (3:00 pm)	Essendon 17.15 (117)	def.	St Kilda 3.7 (25)	East Melbourne Cricket Ground
Saturday, 4 August (3:00 pm)	Geelong 8.9 (57)	def.	Fitzroy 1.6 (12)	Corio Oval
Saturday, 4 August (3:00 pm)	Melbourne 6.8 (44)	def. by	South Melbourne 7.6 (48)	Melbourne Cricket Ground

=== Round 14 ===
	Round 14
Saturday, 11 August (3:00 pm)	Carlton 5.15 (45)	def.	South Melbourne 2.7 (19)	Princes Park
Saturday, 11 August (3:00 pm)	Collingwood 10.13 (73)	def.	Melbourne 7.4 (46)	Victoria Park
Saturday, 11 August (3:00 pm)	Essendon 10.7 (67)	def.	Geelong 6.11 (47)	East Melbourne Cricket Ground
Saturday, 11 August (3:00 pm)	St Kilda 7.7 (49)	def. by	Fitzroy 10.22 (82)	Junction Oval

=== Round 3 (postponed) ===
	Round 3
Saturday, 18 August (3:00 pm)	Carlton 6.6 (42)	def.	Melbourne 3.4 (22)	Princes Park
Saturday, 18 August (3:00 pm)	Collingwood 5.15 (45)	def.	South Melbourne 3.7 (25)	Victoria Park
Saturday, 18 August (3:00 pm)	Essendon 4.9 (33)	def.	Fitzroy 3.9 (27)	East Melbourne Cricket Ground
Saturday, 18 August (3:00 pm)	St Kilda 2.6 (18)	def. by	Geelong 7.16 (58)	Junction Oval
Round 3 was scheduled to be played on Saturday, 19 May, but all matches cancelled due to heavy rain; the matches were rescheduled for the weekend after round 14.

== Ladder ==
(P)	Premiers
	Section A
	Section B

#	Team	P	W	L	D	PF	PA	%	Pts
1	Fitzroy	14	11	3	0	729	434	168.0	44
2	Geelong	14	9	5	0	670	444	150.9	36
3	Essendon	14	8	6	0	666	485	137.3	32
4	Collingwood	14	8	6	0	627	540	116.1	32
5	South Melbourne	14	8	6	0	481	532	90.4	32
6	Melbourne (P)	14	6	8	0	654	643	101.7	24
7	Carlton	14	5	9	0	394	558	70.6	20
8	St Kilda	14	1	13	0	376	961	39.1	4

Rules for classification: 1. premiership points; 2. percentage; 3. points for
Average score: 41.0
Source: AFL Tables

== Progression by round ==
Points by round
Team ╲ Round	1	2	4	5	6	7	8	9	10	11	12	13	14	3
Fitzroy	0	4	8	12	16	20	24	28	32	36	40	40	44	44
Geelong	4	8	12	12	12	16	20	20	24	24	28	32	32	36
Essendon	4	4	8	12	16	16	16	16	16	16	20	24	28	32
Collingwood	4	4	4	8	8	8	8	12	12	16	20	24	28	32
South Melbourne	0	4	4	8	12	16	20	24	28	28	28	32	32	32
Melbourne	0	4	4	4	4	8	12	16	20	24	24	24	24	24
Carlton	0	0	4	4	8	8	8	8	8	12	12	12	16	20
St Kilda	4	4	4	4	4	4	4	4	4	4	4	4	4	4

== Finals series ==
=== Sectional rounds ===
==== Sectional round 1 ====
	Sectional round 1
Saturday, 25 August (2:30 pm)	Fitzroy 9.13 (67)	def.	Carlton 5.8 (38)	Brunswick Street Oval
Saturday, 25 August (2:30 pm)	Collingwood 8.20 (68)	def.	St Kilda 0.9 (9)	Victoria Park
Saturday, 25 August (2:30 pm)	South Melbourne 3.1 (19)	def. by	Essendon 9.5 (59)	Lake Oval
Saturday, 25 August (2:30 pm)	Melbourne 5.15 (45)	def.	Geelong 3.10 (28)	East Melbourne Cricket Ground

==== Sectional round 2 ====
	Sectional round 2
Saturday, 1 September (2:30 pm)	Carlton 4.7 (31)	def.	South Melbourne 4.6 (30)	Princes Park
Saturday, 1 September (2:30 pm)	Geelong 6.8 (44)	def.	Collingwood 4.7 (31)	Corio Oval
Saturday, 1 September (2:30 pm)	Essendon 6.3 (39)	def.	Fitzroy 5.6 (36)	East Melbourne Cricket Ground
Saturday, 1 September (2:30 pm)	St Kilda 2.3 (15)	def. by	Melbourne 12.14 (86)	Junction Oval

==== Sectional round 3 ====
	Sectional round 3
Saturday, 8 September (2:30 pm)	Essendon 12.23 (95)	def.	Carlton 1.4 (10)	East Melbourne Cricket Ground
Saturday, 8 September (2:30 pm)	Melbourne 3.6 (24)	def. by	Collingwood 4.6 (30)	Lake Oval
Saturday, 8 September (2:30 pm)	Fitzroy 7.9 (51)	def.	South Melbourne 2.8 (20)	Brunswick Street Oval
Saturday, 8 September (2:30 pm)	St Kilda 5.9 (39)	def. by	Geelong 7.15 (57)	Junction Oval

==== Section A ladder ====
Qualified for finals

#	Team	P	W	L	D	PF	PA	%	Pts
1	Essendon	3	3	0	0	193	65	296.9	12
2	Fitzroy	3	2	1	0	154	97	158.8	8
3	Carlton	3	1	2	0	79	192	41.1	4
4	South Melbourne	3	0	3	0	69	141	48.9	0

Rules for classification: 1. premiership points; 2. percentage; 3. points for
Source: AFL Tables

==== Section B ladder ====
Qualified for finals

#	Team	P	W	L	D	PF	PA	%	Pts
1	Melbourne	3	2	1	0	155	73	212.3	8
2	Collingwood	3	2	1	0	129	77	167.5	8
3	Geelong	3	2	1	0	129	115	112.2	8
4	St Kilda	3	0	3	0	63	211	29.9	0

Rules for classification: 1. premiership points; 2. percentage; 3. points for
Source: AFL Tables

=== Finals ===
Semi-final
15 September, Lake Oval
A1	Essendon	5.13 (43)
B1	Melbourne	7.3 (45)

Grand final
22 September, East Melbourne Cricket Ground
MP	Fitzroy	3.12 (30)
Melbourne	4.10 (34)

All starting times are local time. Source: AFL Tables

==== Semi-final ====
	Semi-final
Saturday, 15 September (2:30 pm)	Essendon 5.13 (43)	def. by	Melbourne 7.3 (45)	Lake Oval

==== Grand final ====
	Grand final
Saturday, 22 September (2:50 pm)	Fitzroy 3.12 (30)	def. by	Melbourne 4.10 (34)	East Melbourne Cricket Ground (crowd: 20,181)

== Win–loss table ==
The following table can be sorted from biggest winning margin to biggest losing margin for each round. If two or more matches in a round are decided by the same margin, these margins are sorted by percentage (i.e. the lowest-scoring winning team is ranked highest and the lowest-scoring losing team is ranked lowest). Opponents are listed above the margins and home matches are in bold. The rescheduling of round 3 until after round 14, which occurred following the cancellation of the originally scheduled matches due to heavy rain, is also reflected in this table.

By winning the minor premiership and accruing at least eight premiership points from its three sectional matches, Fitzroy won the right to challenge the semi-final winner for the premiership.

+	Win	Qualified for finals
−	Loss	Eliminated
X	Bye	

Team	Home-and-away season														Home- and-away ladder	Finals series					
Team	Home-and-away season														Home- and-away ladder	Sectional rounds			Sectional ladders	Finals	
Team	1	2	4	5	6	7	8	9	10	11	12	13	14	3	Home- and-away ladder	S1	S2	S3	Sectional ladders	SF	GF
Carlton	**GEE** **−17**	FIT −24	STK +9	**ESS** **−5**	**COL** **+16**	SM −12	GEE −8	**FIT** **−38**	MEL −35	**STK** **+21**	ESS −49	COL −68	**SM** **+26**	**MEL** **+20**	7 (5–9–0)	FIT −29	**SM** **+1**	ESS −85	A3 (1–2–0)		
Collingwood	**FIT** **+21**	GEE −22	ESS −69	**STK** **+46**	CAR −16	MEL −29	FIT −22	**GEE** **+19**	SM −2	**ESS** **+21**	STK +25	**CAR** **+68**	**MEL** **+27**	**SM** **+20**	4 (8–6–0)	**STK** **+59**	GEE −13	MEL +6	B2 (2–1–0)		
Essendon	**SM** **+56**	MEL −16	**COL** **+69**	CAR +5	STK +11	GEE −22	SM −28	**MEL** **−26**	FIT −14	COL −21	**CAR** **+49**	**STK** **+92**	**GEE** **+20**	**FIT** **+6**	3 (8–6–0)	SM +40	**FIT** **+3**	**CAR** **+85**	A1 (3–0–0)	**MEL** **−2**	
Fitzroy	COL −21	**CAR** **+24**	**SM** **+33**	MEL +39	**GEE** **+34**	**STK** **+99**	**COL** **+22**	CAR +38	**ESS** **+14**	SM +6	**MEL** **+25**	GEE −45	STK +33	ESS −6	1 (11–3–0)	**CAR** **+29**	ESS −3	**SM** **+31**	A2 (2–1–0)	X	**MEL** **−4**
Geelong	CAR +17	**COL** **+22**	**MEL** **+66**	SM −14	FIT −34	**ESS** **+22**	**CAR** **+8**	COL −19	**STK** **+58**	MEL −11	**SM** **+46**	**FIT** **+45**	ESS −20	STK +40	2 (9–5–0)	MEL −17	**COL** **+13**	STK +18	B3 (2–1–0)		
Melbourne	STK −1	**ESS** **+16**	GEE −66	**FIT** **−39**	SM −3	**COL** **+29**	**STK** **+79**	ESS +26	**CAR** **+35**	**GEE** **+11**	FIT −25	**SM** **−4**	COL −27	CAR −20	6 (6–8–0)	**GEE** **+17**	STK +71	**COL** **−6**	B1 (2–1–0)	ESS +2	FIT +4
South Melbourne	ESS −56	**STK** **+32**	FIT −33	**GEE** **+14**	**MEL** **+3**	**CAR** **+12**	**ESS** **+28**	STK +41	**COL** **+2**	**FIT** **−6**	GEE −46	MEL +4	CAR −26	COL −20	5 (8–6–0)	**ESS** **−40**	CAR −1	FIT −31	A4 (0–3–0)		
St Kilda	**MEL** **+1**	SM −32	**CAR** **−9**	COL −46	**ESS** **−11**	FIT −99	MEL −79	**SM** **−41**	GEE −58	CAR −21	**COL** **−25**	ESS −92	**FIT** **−33**	**GEE** **−40**	8 (1–13–0)	COL −59	**MEL** **−71**	**GEE** **−18**	B4 (0–3–0)		

Source: AFL Tables

== Season notes ==
- The Round 1 match between St Kilda and Melbourne ended in a draw, but the result was changed to a St Kilda victory on protest after it was noted that the umpire did not signal the end of the third quarter in the correct fashion after hearing the bell. This was St Kilda's first-ever VFL win (after 48 losses), their first win since 1896 in the VFA (after 51 losses), and was the first of only two occasions that the score of a game has been changed on protest (the second was the 2006 AFL siren controversy between St Kilda and Fremantle).
- St Kilda footballer Dave Strickland, the father of Shirley Strickland, won the 1900 Stawell Gift in 12 seconds off a handicap of 10 yards.
- Collingwood's highly talented "loose cannon" Dick Condon was given a lifetime suspension for sustained abuse of field umpire Henry "Ivo" Crapp.
- By the end of the finals round-robin matches, more than 1,000 points had been scored against St Kilda in a single season.
- Melbourne won the 1900 premiership despite having a 6–8 record after the home-and-away matches and finishing sixth of the eight teams on the ladder. This unsatisfactory situation led to the formation of the Argus Final Four system for 1901, which was modified in 1902 and 1907 and used until 1930 (except for 1924).

== Sources ==
- 1900 VFL season at AFL Tables
- 1900 VFL season at Australian Football
