= 1903 VFL season =

Seventh season of the Victorian Football League (VFL)

1903 VFL premiership season
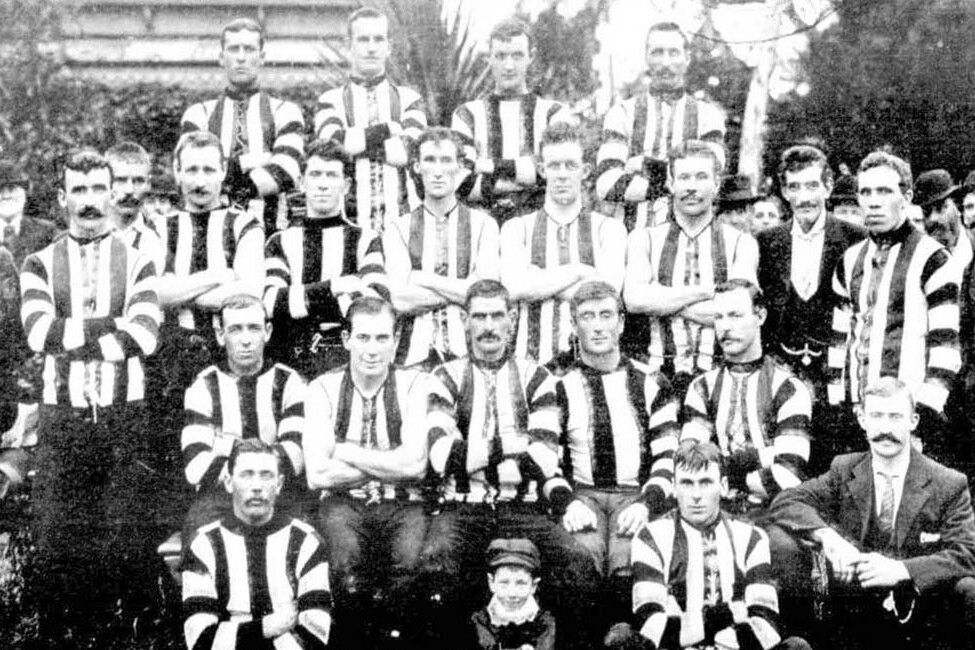
- Collingwood 1903 VFL premiership team
- Date: 2 May – 12 September 1903
- Teams: 8
- Premiers: Collingwood; 2nd premiership
- Minor premiers: Collingwood; 2nd minor premiership
- Leading goalkicker medallist: Teddy Lockwood (Collingwood); 33 goals
- Matches played: 71

The 1903 VFL season was the seventh season of the Victorian Football League (VFL), the highest-level senior Australian rules football competition in Victoria. The season featured eight clubs and ran from 2 May to 12 September, comprising a 17-round home-and-away season followed by a two-week finals series featuring the top four clubs.

Collingwood won the premiership, defeating Fitzroy by two points in the 1903 VFL grand final; it was Collingwood's second (consecutive and overall) VFL premiership. Collingwood also won its second consecutive minor premiership by finishing atop the home-and-away ladder with a 15–2 win–loss record. Collingwood's Teddy Lockwood won the leading goalkicker medal as the league's leading goalkicker.

== Background ==
In 1903, the VFL competition consisted of eight teams of 18 on-the-field players each, with no "reserves", although any of the 18 players who had left the playing field for any reason could later resume their place on the field at any time during the match.

Each team played each other twice in a home-and-away season of 14 rounds. Then, based on ladder positions after those 14 rounds, three further 'sectional rounds' were played, with the teams ranked 1st, 3rd, 5th and 7th playing in one section and the teams ranked 2nd, 4th, 6th and 8th playing in the other.

Once the 17 round home-and-away season had finished, the 1903 VFL Premiers were determined by the specific format and conventions of the amended "Argus system".

== Home-and-away season ==
=== Round 1 ===
Home team	Home team score	Away team	Away team score	Venue	Date
Essendon	3.3 (21)	Fitzroy	11.7 (73)	East Melbourne Cricket Ground	2 May 1903
Carlton	9.4 (58)	Collingwood	5.7 (37)	Princes Park	2 May 1903
South Melbourne	6.14 (50)	Melbourne	5.13 (43)	Lake Oval	2 May 1903
St Kilda	2.8 (20)	Geelong	9.18 (72)	Junction Oval	2 May 1903

=== Round 2 ===
Home team	Home team score	Away team	Away team score	Venue	Date
Collingwood	13.14 (92)	South Melbourne	3.6 (24)	Victoria Park	9 May 1903
Melbourne	4.5 (29)	Fitzroy	6.11 (47)	MCG	9 May 1903
St Kilda	3.12 (30)	Essendon	4.6 (30)	Junction Oval	9 May 1903
Geelong	8.7 (55)	Carlton	6.9 (45)	SCG	3 August 1903

The match between Geelong and Carlton, originally to have been played at Corio Oval, was postponed due to a railway strike. It was played between Rounds 13 and 14, and was opportunistically moved to the Sydney Cricket Ground.

=== Round 3 ===
Home team	Home team score	Away team	Away team score	Venue	Date
Geelong	15.10 (100)	Melbourne	4.8 (32)	Corio Oval	16 May 1903
Fitzroy	12.17 (89)	South Melbourne	3.4 (22)	Brunswick Street Oval	16 May 1903
Collingwood	16.17 (113)	St Kilda	5.3 (33)	Victoria Park	16 May 1903
Essendon	5.5 (35)	Carlton	7.14 (56)	East Melbourne Cricket Ground	16 May 1903

=== Round 4 ===
Home team	Home team score	Away team	Away team score	Venue	Date
Carlton	12.16 (88)	St Kilda	1.4 (10)	Princes Park	23 May 1903
South Melbourne	5.7 (37)	Geelong	6.11 (47)	Lake Oval	23 May 1903
Melbourne	3.7 (25)	Essendon	4.4 (28)	MCG	23 May 1903
Fitzroy	7.20 (62)	Collingwood	6.9 (45)	SCG	23 May 1903

=== Round 5 ===
Home team	Home team score	Away team	Away team score	Venue	Date
Fitzroy	13.17 (95)	St Kilda	3.10 (28)	Brunswick Street Oval	30 May 1903
Essendon	10.13 (73)	Geelong	5.10 (40)	East Melbourne Cricket Ground	30 May 1903
Collingwood	10.17 (77)	Melbourne	7.4 (46)	Victoria Park	30 May 1903
South Melbourne	5.4 (34)	Carlton	10.7 (67)	Lake Oval	30 May 1903

=== Round 6 ===
Home team	Home team score	Away team	Away team score	Venue	Date
Essendon	5.11 (41)	South Melbourne	6.12 (48)	East Melbourne Cricket Ground	6 June 1903
Carlton	8.8 (56)	Fitzroy	4.5 (29)	Princes Park	6 June 1903
St Kilda	8.9 (57)	Melbourne	2.15 (27)	Junction Oval	6 June 1903
Geelong	8.3 (51)	Collingwood	12.12 (84)	Corio Oval	6 June 1903

=== Round 7 ===
Home team	Home team score	Away team	Away team score	Venue	Date
Fitzroy	8.14 (62)	Geelong	3.4 (22)	Brunswick Street Oval	8 June 1903
Collingwood	4.9 (33)	Essendon	2.13 (25)	Victoria Park	8 June 1903
South Melbourne	5.8 (38)	St Kilda	6.11 (47)	Lake Oval	8 June 1903
Melbourne	4.8 (32)	Carlton	1.2 (8)	MCG	8 June 1903

=== Round 8 ===
Home team	Home team score	Away team	Away team score	Venue	Date
Melbourne	6.6 (42)	South Melbourne	3.17 (35)	MCG	13 June 1903
Geelong	5.9 (39)	St Kilda	7.13 (55)	Corio Oval	13 June 1903
Fitzroy	8.6 (54)	Essendon	3.11 (29)	Brunswick Street Oval	13 June 1903
Collingwood	12.9 (81)	Carlton	10.7 (67)	Victoria Park	13 June 1903

=== Round 9 ===
Home team	Home team score	Away team	Away team score	Venue	Date
Fitzroy	4.10 (34)	Melbourne	3.8 (26)	Brunswick Street Oval	20 June 1903
Essendon	4.8 (32)	St Kilda	4.5 (29)	East Melbourne Cricket Ground	20 June 1903
Carlton	8.6 (54)	Geelong	6.11 (47)	Princes Park	20 June 1903
South Melbourne	4.11 (35)	Collingwood	6.6 (42)	Lake Oval	20 June 1903

=== Round 10 ===
Home team	Home team score	Away team	Away team score	Venue	Date
Carlton	6.14 (50)	Essendon	2.2 (14)	Princes Park	4 July 1903
Melbourne	5.9 (39)	Geelong	10.7 (67)	MCG	4 July 1903
South Melbourne	5.7 (37)	Fitzroy	7.11 (53)	Lake Oval	4 July 1903
St Kilda	2.4 (16)	Collingwood	5.11 (41)	Junction Oval	4 July 1903

=== Round 11 ===
Home team	Home team score	Away team	Away team score	Venue	Date
Geelong	9.13 (67)	South Melbourne	3.12 (30)	Corio Oval	11 July 1903
Essendon	3.16 (34)	Melbourne	4.5 (29)	East Melbourne Cricket Ground	11 July 1903
Collingwood	8.8 (56)	Fitzroy	5.6 (36)	Victoria Park	11 July 1903
St Kilda	4.3 (27)	Carlton	8.14 (62)	Junction Oval	11 July 1903

=== Round 12 ===
Home team	Home team score	Away team	Away team score	Venue	Date
Carlton	7.8 (50)	South Melbourne	2.8 (20)	Princes Park	18 July 1903
St Kilda	5.11 (41)	Fitzroy	5.8 (38)	Junction Oval	18 July 1903
Geelong	13.11 (89)	Essendon	6.8 (44)	Corio Oval	18 July 1903
Melbourne	4.8 (32)	Collingwood	11.8 (74)	MCG	18 July 1903

=== Round 13 ===
Home team	Home team score	Away team	Away team score	Venue	Date
Melbourne	4.8 (32)	St Kilda	9.7 (61)	MCG	25 July 1903
Collingwood	6.15 (51)	Geelong	5.7 (37)	Victoria Park	25 July 1903
South Melbourne	5.7 (37)	Essendon	7.17 (59)	Lake Oval	25 July 1903
Fitzroy	8.8 (56)	Carlton	3.6 (24)	Brunswick Street Oval	25 July 1903

=== Round 14 ===
Home team	Home team score	Away team	Away team score	Venue	Date
Carlton	5.11 (41)	Melbourne	8.8 (56)	Princes Park	8 August 1903
Essendon	7.4 (46)	Collingwood	11.7 (73)	East Melbourne Cricket Ground	8 August 1903
Geelong	5.3 (33)	Fitzroy	9.12 (66)	Corio Oval	8 August 1903
St Kilda	12.9 (81)	South Melbourne	4.8 (32)	Junction Oval	8 August 1903

=== Pre-sectional ladder ===
Section A
Section B

#	Team	P	W	L	D	PF	PA	%	Pts
1	Collingwood	14	12	2	0	899	568	158.3	48
2	Fitzroy	14	11	3	0	794	469	169.3	44
3	Carlton	14	9	5	0	726	533	136.2	36
4	Geelong	14	7	7	0	766	692	110.7	28
5	St Kilda	14	6	7	1	535	739	72.4	26
6	Essendon	14	5	8	1	511	666	76.7	22
7	Melbourne	14	3	11	0	490	713	68.7	12
8	South Melbourne	14	2	12	0	479	820	58.4	8

Rules for classification: 1. premiership points; 2. percentage; 3. points for
Source: AFL Tables

=== Round 15 (Sectional round 1) ===
Home team	Home team score	Away team	Away team score	Venue	Date
Melbourne	5.2 (32)	Carlton	9.13 (67)	MCG	15 August 1903
Collingwood	3.12 (30)	St Kilda	2.6 (18)	Victoria Park	15 August 1903
Essendon	8.7 (55)	Fitzroy	10.14 (74)	East Melbourne Cricket Ground	15 August 1903
South Melbourne	8.8 (56)	Geelong	12.14 (86)	Lake Oval	15 August 1903

=== Round 16 (Sectional round 2) ===
Home team	Home team score	Away team	Away team score	Venue	Date
Carlton	5.11 (41)	Collingwood	6.7 (43)	Princes Park	22 August 1903
Geelong	15.12 (102)	Essendon	4.7 (31)	Corio Oval	22 August 1903
Fitzroy	11.17 (83)	South Melbourne	3.5 (23)	Brunswick Street Oval	22 August 1903
St Kilda	7.12 (54)	Melbourne	4.7 (31)	Junction Oval	22 August 1903

=== Round 17 (Sectional round 3) ===
Home team	Home team score	Away team	Away team score	Venue	Date
St Kilda	3.10 (28)	Carlton	4.7 (31)	Junction Oval	29 August 1903
Collingwood	13.13 (91)	Melbourne	5.10 (40)	Victoria Park	29 August 1903
Essendon	14.10 (94)	South Melbourne	5.7 (37)	East Melbourne Cricket Ground	29 August 1903
Geelong	3.9 (27)	Fitzroy	5.4 (34)	Corio Oval	29 August 1903

== Ladder ==
(P)	Premiers
	Qualified for finals

#	Team	P	W	L	D	PF	PA	%	Pts
1	Collingwood (P)	17	15	2	0	1063	667	159.4	60
2	Fitzroy	17	14	3	0	985	574	171.6	56
3	Carlton	17	11	6	0	865	636	136.0	44
4	Geelong	17	9	8	0	981	813	120.7	36
5	St Kilda	17	7	9	1	635	831	76.4	30
6	Essendon	17	6	10	1	691	879	78.6	26
7	Melbourne	17	3	14	0	593	925	64.1	12
8	South Melbourne	17	2	15	0	595	1083	54.9	8

Rules for classification: 1. premiership points; 2. percentage; 3. points for
Average score: 47.1
Source: AFL Tables

== Finals series ==
=== Semi-finals ===
Home team	Home team score	Away team	Away team score	Venue	Date	Attendance
Fitzroy	11.15 (81)	Geelong	4.5 (29)	MCG	5 September 1903	15,000
Collingwood	4.3 (27)	Carlton	3.5 (23)	Brunswick Street Oval	5 September 1903	16,600

=== Grand final ===
	Grand final
Saturday, 12 September (3:10 pm)	Collingwood 4.7 (31)	def.	Fitzroy 3.11 (29)	Melbourne Cricket Ground (crowd: 32,363)

== Win–loss table ==
The following table can be sorted from biggest winning margin to biggest losing margin for each round. If two or more matches in a round are decided by the same margin, these margins are sorted by percentage (i.e. the lowest-scoring winning team is ranked highest and the lowest-scoring losing team is ranked lowest). Opponents are listed above the margins and home matches are in bold.

+	Win		Qualified for finals
−	Loss		Eliminated
	Draw	X	Bye

Team	Home-and-away season																	Ladder	Finals series	
Team	1	2	3	4	5	6	7	8	9	10	11	12	13	14	15	16	17	Ladder	SF	GF
Carlton	**COL** **+21**	GEE −10	ESS +21	**STK** **+78**	SM +33	**FIT** **+27**	MEL −24	COL −14	**GEE** **+7**	**ESS** **+36**	STK +35	**SM** **+30**	FIT −32	**MEL** **−15**	MEL +35	**COL** **−2**	STK +3	3 (11–6–0)	COL −4	
Collingwood	CAR −21	**SM** **+68**	**STK** **+80**	FIT −17	**MEL** **+31**	GEE +33	**ESS** **+8**	**CAR** **+14**	SM +7	STK +25	**FIT** **+20**	MEL +42	**GEE** **+14**	ESS +27	**STK** **+12**	CAR +2	**MEL** **+51**	1 (15–2–0)	**CAR** **+4**	**FIT** **+2**
Essendon	**FIT** **−52**	STK; 0	**CAR** **−21**	MEL +3	**GEE** **+33**	**SM** **−7**	COL −8	FIT −25	**STK** **+3**	CAR −36	**MEL** **+5**	GEE −45	SM +22	**COL** **−27**	**FIT** **−19**	GEE −71	**SM** **+57**	6 (6–10–1)		
Fitzroy	ESS +52	MEL +18	**SM** **+67**	**COL** **+17**	**STK** **+67**	CAR −27	**GEE** **+40**	**ESS** **+25**	**MEL** **+8**	SM +16	COL −20	STK −3	**CAR** **+32**	GEE +33	ESS +19	**SM** **+60**	GEE +7	2 (14–3–0)	**GEE** **+52**	COL −2
Geelong	STK +52	**CAR** **+10**	**MEL** **+68**	SM +10	ESS −33	**COL** **−33**	FIT −40	**STK** **−16**	CAR −7	MEL +28	**SM** **+37**	**ESS** **+45**	COL −14	**FIT** **−33**	SM +30	**ESS** **+71**	**FIT** **−7**	4 (9–8–0)	FIT −52	
Melbourne	SM −7	**FIT** **−18**	GEE −68	**ESS** **−3**	COL −31	STK −30	**CAR** **+24**	**SM** **+7**	FIT −8	**GEE** **−28**	ESS −5	**COL** **−42**	**STK** **−29**	CAR +15	**CAR** **−35**	STK −23	COL −51	7 (3–14–0)		
South Melbourne	**MEL** **+7**	COL −68	FIT −67	**GEE** **−10**	**CAR** **−33**	ESS +7	**STK** **−9**	MEL −7	**COL** **−7**	**FIT** **−16**	GEE −37	CAR −30	**ESS** **−22**	STK −49	**GEE** **−30**	FIT −60	ESS −57	8 (2–15–0)		
St Kilda	**GEE** **−52**	**ESS**; **0**	COL −80	CAR −78	FIT −67	**MEL** **+30**	SM +9	GEE +16	ESS −3	**COL** **−25**	**CAR** **−35**	**FIT** **+3**	MEL +29	**SM** **+49**	COL −12	**MEL** **+23**	**CAR** **−3**	5 (7–9–1)		

Source: AFL Tables

== Season notes ==
- Boundary umpires were added to some VFL matches, relieving the field umpire of the task of returning the ball to play from the boundary, and would be made permanent from 1904.
- Following their Round 1 loss to Geelong, St Kilda had played 100 VFL games for a record of two wins and 98 losses.
- The Round 2 match between Geelong and Carlton on 9 May was postponed after a snap railway strike on the afternoon of 8 May prevented the Carlton team from reaching Geelong when the Blues were halfway through the trip, leaving the club unable to arrange travel by boat on such short notice. In Round 3, when the strike still had not been resolved, Melbourne travelled to Geelong by boat.
  - As there was no vacant Saturday in the fixture to play at Geelong, the league decided to use an opportunity to promote the game in Sydney, and arranged to play the match on Saturday, 1 August at the Sydney Cricket Ground. Due to heavy rain, the match was postponed again to Monday, 3 August before a crowd of 5,000; Geelong won 8.7 (55) to 6.9 (45).
- On 23 May, a crowd of 18,000 attended the round 4 match between Fitzroy and Collingwood at the Sydney Cricket Ground; Fitzroy won 7.20 (62) to 6.9 (45). Players wore large numbers on the back of their guernseys to assist the crowd.
- St Kilda's win over South Melbourne in Round 7 was its first away win in 54 matches; the 53 consecutive away losses is an AFL/VFL record. It was also St Kilda's first senior away win since defeating Port Melbourne in 1894, after 77 consecutive winless away matches (including three draws) and 62 consecutive away losses.
- 1903 was the first time that the VFL Premiership was decided on the last kick of the day. The usually accurate Fitzroy captain Gerald Brosnan missed the goal from 30 metres out, and Fitzroy lost to Collingwood by two points.

== Awards ==
- The VFL's leading goalkicker was Teddy Lockwood of Collingwood with 35 goals.
- South Melbourne took the "wooden spoon" in 1903.

== Sources ==
- 1903 VFL season at AFL Tables
- 1903 VFL season at Australian Football
