= 1917 VFL season =

21st season of the Victorian Football League (VFL)

1917 VFL premiership season
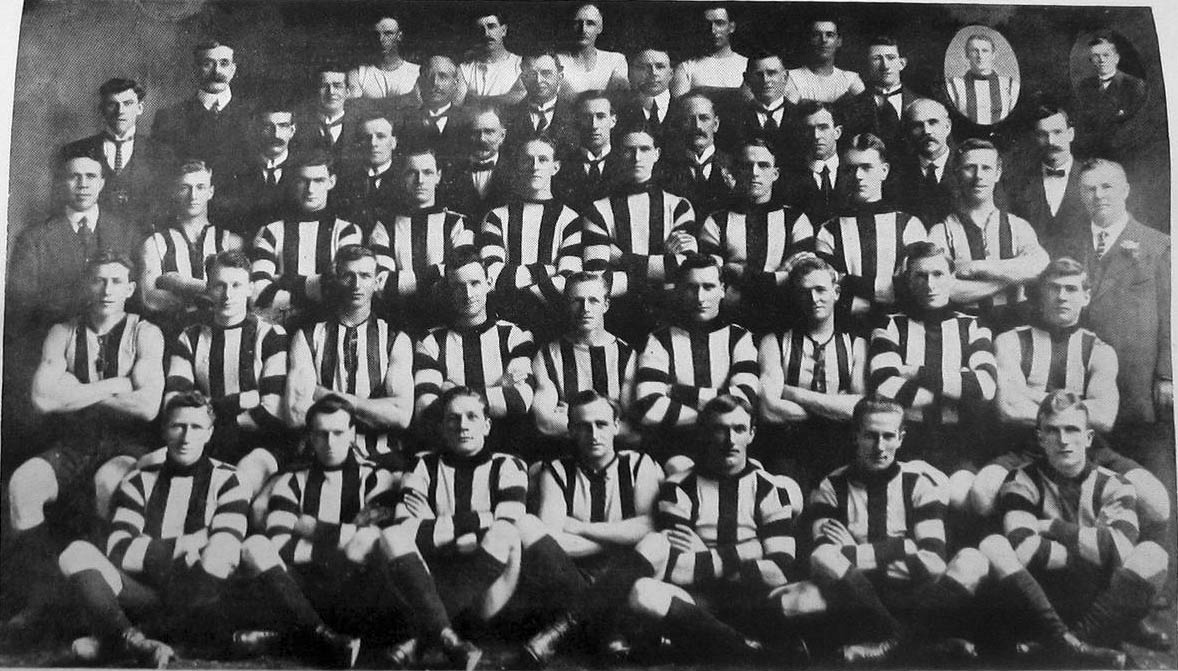
- Collingwood 1917 VFL premiership team
- Date: 12 May – 22 September 1917
- Teams: 6
- Premiers: Collingwood; 4th premiership
- Minor premiers: Collingwood; 5th minor premiership
- Leading goalkicker medallist: Dick Lee (Collingwood); 50 goals
- Matches played: 49

The 1917 VFL season was the 21st season of the Victorian Football League (VFL), the highest-level senior Australian rules football competition in Victoria. Played during the latter stages of World War I, six of the league's nine clubs featured in 1917, with Geelong and South Melbourne returning after being in recess the previous season. The season ran from 12 May to 22 September, comprising a 15-match home-and-away season followed by a four-week finals series featuring the top four clubs.

Collingwood won the premiership, defeating Fitzroy by 35 points in the 1917 VFL grand final; it was Collingwood's fourth VFL premiership. Collingwood also won the minor premiership by finishing atop the home-and-away ladder with a 10–4–1 win–loss–draw record. Collingwood's Dick Lee won his sixth leading goalkicker medal as the league's leading goalkicker.

== Background ==
In 1917, the VFL competition consisted of six teams of 18 on-the-field players each, with no "reserves", although any of the 18 players who had left the playing field for any reason could later resume their place on the field at any time during the match.

Each of the six teams played each other three times in a 15 match home-and-away season (Geelong, Richmond, and South Melbourne each hosting eight games, while Carlton, Collingwood, and Fitzroy each hosted seven).

Once the 15 round home-and-away season had finished, the 1917 VFL Premiers were determined by the specific format and conventions of the amended "Argus system".

=== Round 1 ===
Home team	Home team score	Away team	Away team score	Venue	Date
Collingwood	11.11 (77)	Richmond	4.4 (28)	Victoria Park	12 May 1917
South Melbourne	9.18 (72)	Geelong	4.14 (38)	Lake Oval	12 May 1917
Fitzroy	6.9 (45)	Carlton	6.9 (45)	Brunswick Street Oval	12 May 1917

=== Round 2 ===
Home team	Home team score	Away team	Away team score	Venue	Date
Richmond	6.16 (52)	South Melbourne	8.16 (64)	Punt Road Oval	19 May 1917
Carlton	13.7 (85)	Collingwood	8.6 (54)	Princes Park	19 May 1917
Geelong	6.10 (46)	Fitzroy	8.16 (64)	Corio Oval	19 May 1917

=== Round 3 ===
Home team	Home team score	Away team	Away team score	Venue	Date
Richmond	14.6 (90)	Geelong	6.16 (52)	Punt Road Oval	26 May 1917
Fitzroy	8.14 (62)	Collingwood	11.12 (78)	Brunswick Street Oval	26 May 1917
South Melbourne	5.16 (46)	Carlton	3.13 (31)	Lake Oval	26 May 1917

=== Round 4 ===
Home team	Home team score	Away team	Away team score	Venue	Date
Collingwood	8.18 (66)	South Melbourne	6.9 (45)	Victoria Park	2 June 1917
Fitzroy	6.13 (49)	Richmond	5.8 (38)	Brunswick Street Oval	4 June 1917
Carlton	5.12 (42)	Geelong	6.7 (43)	Princes Park	4 June 1917

=== Round 5 ===
Home team	Home team score	Away team	Away team score	Venue	Date
Carlton	14.13 (97)	Richmond	7.11 (53)	Princes Park	9 June 1917
South Melbourne	5.20 (50)	Fitzroy	8.7 (55)	Lake Oval	9 June 1917
Geelong	6.7 (43)	Collingwood	8.9 (57)	Corio Oval	9 June 1917

=== Round 6 ===
Home team	Home team score	Away team	Away team score	Venue	Date
Geelong	6.14 (50)	South Melbourne	6.11 (47)	Corio Oval	16 June 1917
Carlton	4.17 (41)	Fitzroy	8.9 (57)	Princes Park	16 June 1917
Richmond	7.8 (50)	Collingwood	6.14 (50)	Punt Road Oval	16 June 1917

=== Round 7 ===
Home team	Home team score	Away team	Away team score	Venue	Date
Fitzroy	8.4 (52)	Geelong	9.11 (65)	Brunswick Street Oval	23 June 1917
South Melbourne	9.17 (71)	Richmond	6.3 (39)	Lake Oval	23 June 1917
Collingwood	13.14 (92)	Carlton	8.7 (55)	Victoria Park	23 June 1917

=== Round 8 ===
Home team	Home team score	Away team	Away team score	Venue	Date
Geelong	11.15 (81)	Richmond	5.4 (34)	Corio Oval	30 June 1917
Collingwood	11.11 (77)	Fitzroy	10.14 (74)	Victoria Park	30 June 1917
Carlton	9.11 (65)	South Melbourne	7.12 (54)	Princes Park	30 June 1917

=== Round 9 ===
Home team	Home team score	Away team	Away team score	Venue	Date
Richmond	13.9 (87)	Fitzroy	5.8 (38)	Punt Road Oval	7 July 1917
South Melbourne	13.12 (90)	Collingwood	10.13 (73)	Lake Oval	7 July 1917
Geelong	3.11 (29)	Carlton	4.10 (34)	Corio Oval	7 July 1917

=== Round 10 ===
Home team	Home team score	Away team	Away team score	Venue	Date
Fitzroy	9.10 (64)	South Melbourne	8.9 (57)	Brunswick Street Oval	14 July 1917
Collingwood	10.19 (79)	Geelong	2.11 (23)	Victoria Park	14 July 1917
Richmond	6.10 (46)	Carlton	7.9 (51)	Punt Road Oval	14 July 1917

=== Round 11 ===
Home team	Home team score	Away team	Away team score	Venue	Date
Collingwood	11.19 (85)	Richmond	7.7 (49)	Victoria Park	21 July 1917
South Melbourne	14.14 (98)	Geelong	6.13 (49)	Lake Oval	21 July 1917
Fitzroy	5.15 (45)	Carlton	8.11 (59)	Brunswick Street Oval	21 July 1917

=== Round 12 ===
Home team	Home team score	Away team	Away team score	Venue	Date
Richmond	5.11 (41)	South Melbourne	7.14 (56)	Punt Road Oval	28 July 1917
Carlton	4.13 (37)	Collingwood	3.8 (26)	Princes Park	28 July 1917
Geelong	10.3 (63)	Fitzroy	12.10 (82)	Corio Oval	28 July 1917

=== Round 13 ===
Home team	Home team score	Away team	Away team score	Venue	Date
Richmond	5.12 (42)	Geelong	7.8 (50)	Punt Road Oval	11 August 1917
Fitzroy	7.3 (45)	Collingwood	14.17 (101)	Brunswick Street Oval	11 August 1917
South Melbourne	8.7 (55)	Carlton	6.14 (50)	Lake Oval	11 August 1917

=== Round 14 ===
Home team	Home team score	Away team	Away team score	Venue	Date
Collingwood	6.16 (52)	South Melbourne	2.9 (21)	Victoria Park	18 August 1917
Richmond	10.11 (71)	Fitzroy	7.11 (53)	Punt Road Oval	18 August 1917
Geelong	5.8 (38)	Carlton	10.11 (71)	Corio Oval	18 August 1917

=== Round 15 ===
Home team	Home team score	Away team	Away team score	Venue	Date
Carlton	12.8 (80)	Richmond	4.17 (41)	Princes Park	25 August 1917
South Melbourne	12.13 (85)	Fitzroy	7.5 (47)	Lake Oval	25 August 1917
Geelong	8.17 (65)	Collingwood	9.9 (63)	Corio Oval	25 August 1917

== Ladder ==
(P)	Premiers
	Qualified for finals

#	Team	P	W	L	D	PF	PA	%	Pts
1	Collingwood (P)	15	10	4	1	1030	772	133.4	42
2	Carlton	15	9	5	1	843	724	116.4	38
3	South Melbourne	15	9	6	0	911	772	118.0	36
4	Fitzroy	15	6	8	1	832	963	86.4	26
5	Geelong	15	6	9	0	735	927	79.3	24
6	Richmond	15	3	11	1	761	954	79.8	14

Rules for classification: 1. premiership points; 2. percentage; 3. points for
Average score: 56.8
Source: AFL Tables

== Finals series ==
=== Semi-finals ===
Home team	Score	Away team	Score	Venue	Attendance	Date
Carlton	6.8 (44)	Fitzroy	6.17 (53)	MCG	15,605	Saturday, 1 September
Collingwood	13.17 (95)	South Melbourne	3.17 (35)	MCG	16,505	Saturday, 8 September

=== Preliminary final ===
Home team	Score	Away team	Score	Venue	Attendance	Date
Collingwood	7.10 (52)	Fitzroy	8.10 (58)	MCG	22,786	Saturday, 15 September

=== Grand final ===
Home team	Score	Away team	Score	Venue	Attendance	Date
Collingwood	9.20 (74)	Fitzroy	5.9 (39)	MCG	28,512	Saturday, 22 September

== Season notes ==
- Geelong and South Melbourne, having refused to compete in 1916 on "patriotic grounds" returned to the VFL competition, having concluded that the drop in the number of recruits in 1916 indicated that the VFL competition had no effect on military recruitment. The Geelong players met their own expenses and played as amateurs, with the club donating all of its 1917 profits to war funds.
- On 12 May 1917, recruiting officers visiting VFL grounds were heckled by spectators. On another occasion a Fitzroy crowd attacked a recruiting sergeant.
- On 4 August, the entire thirteenth round was put back a week, at the request of the State War Council, so that recruiting meetings could be held at each VFL ground.

== Awards ==
- The 1917 VFL Premiership team was Collingwood.
- The VFL's leading goalkicker was Dick Lee of Collingwood with 50 goals (54 after finals).
- Richmond took the "wooden spoon" in 1917.

== Sources ==
- 1917 VFL season at AFL Tables
- 1917 VFL season at Australian Football
