= 1906 VFL season =

Tenth season of the Victorian Football League (VFL)

1906 VFL premiership season
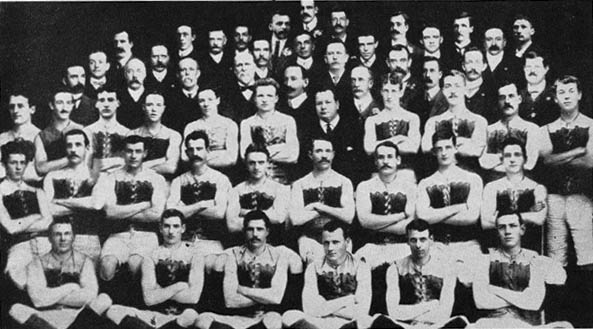
- Carlton 1906 VFL premiership team
- Date: 5 May – 22 September 1906
- Teams: 8
- Premiers: Carlton; 1st premiership
- Minor premiers: Carlton; 1st minor premiership
- Leading goalkicker medallist: Mick Grace (Carlton); 50 goals
- Matches played: 71

The 1906 VFL season was the tenth season of the Victorian Football League (VFL), the highest-level senior Australian rules football competition in Victoria. The season featured eight clubs and ran from 5 May to 22 September, comprising a 17-match home-and-away season followed by a two-week finals series featuring the top four clubs.

Carlton won the premiership, defeating Fitzroy by 49 points in the 1906 VFL grand final; it was Carlton's first VFL premiership. Carlton also won the minor premiership by finishing atop the home-and-away ladder with a 14–3 win–loss record. Carlton's Mick Grace won the leading goalkicker medal as the league's leading goalkicker, becoming the first player to kick 50 goals in a VFL season.

== Background ==
In 1906, the VFL competition consisted of eight teams of 18 on-the-field players each, with no "reserves", although any of the 18 players who had left the playing field for any reason could later resume their place on the field at any time during the match.

Each team played each other twice in a home-and-away season of 14 rounds. Then, based on ladder positions after those 14 rounds, three further 'sectional rounds' were played, with the teams ranked 1st, 3rd, 5th and 7th playing in one section and the teams ranked 2nd, 4th, 6th and 8th playing in the other.

Once the 17 round home-and-away season had finished, the 1906 VFL Premiers were determined by the specific format and conventions of the amended "Argus system".

== Home-and-away season ==
=== Round 1 ===
Home team	Home team score	Away team	Away team score	Venue	Date
Fitzroy	8.20 (68)	St Kilda	1.8 (14)	Brunswick Street Oval	5 May 1906
Essendon	8.12 (60)	South Melbourne	9.13 (67)	EMCG	5 May 1906
Collingwood	12.19 (91)	Geelong	5.7 (37)	Victoria Park	5 May 1906
Carlton	12.11 (83)	Melbourne	8.8 (56)	Princes Park	5 May 1906

=== Round 2 ===
Home team	Home team score	Away team	Away team score	Venue	Date
Melbourne	8.5 (53)	Fitzroy	10.13 (73)	MCG	12 May 1906
Geelong	5.12 (42)	Essendon	11.14 (80)	Corio Oval	12 May 1906
South Melbourne	12.5 (77)	Collingwood	8.9 (57)	Lake Oval	12 May 1906
St Kilda	5.5 (35)	Carlton	15.10 (100)	Junction Oval	12 May 1906

=== Round 3 ===
Home team	Home team score	Away team	Away team score	Venue	Date
Essendon	10.16 (76)	Melbourne	6.6 (42)	EMCG	19 May 1906
Carlton	16.10 (106)	Geelong	6.7 (43)	Princes Park	19 May 1906
South Melbourne	10.14 (74)	St Kilda	9.7 (61)	Lake Oval	19 May 1906
Fitzroy	7.7 (49)	Collingwood	14.8 (92)	Brunswick Street Oval	19 May 1906

=== Round 4 ===
Home team	Home team score	Away team	Away team score	Venue	Date
Melbourne	5.9 (39)	South Melbourne	5.4 (34)	MCG	26 May 1906
Geelong	4.7 (31)	Fitzroy	8.9 (57)	Corio Oval	26 May 1906
St Kilda	6.8 (44)	Essendon	1.7 (13)	Junction Oval	26 May 1906
Collingwood	4.13 (37)	Carlton	8.9 (57)	Victoria Park	26 May 1906

=== Round 5 ===
Home team	Home team score	Away team	Away team score	Venue	Date
Essendon	6.15 (51)	Fitzroy	6.10 (46)	EMCG	2 June 1906
St Kilda	4.7 (31)	Collingwood	13.11 (89)	Junction Oval	2 June 1906
Carlton	10.9 (69)	South Melbourne	10.5 (65)	Princes Park	4 June 1906
Melbourne	8.8 (56)	Geelong	11.9 (75)	MCG	4 June 1906

=== Round 6 ===
Home team	Home team score	Away team	Away team score	Venue	Date
Geelong	8.13 (61)	South Melbourne	3.13 (31)	Corio Oval	9 June 1906
St Kilda	13.16 (94)	Melbourne	6.9 (45)	Junction Oval	9 June 1906
Essendon	9.12 (66)	Collingwood	6.13 (49)	EMCG	9 June 1906
Fitzroy	6.8 (44)	Carlton	7.14 (56)	Brunswick Street Oval	9 June 1906

=== Round 7 ===
Home team	Home team score	Away team	Away team score	Venue	Date
Geelong	6.5 (41)	St Kilda	4.13 (37)	Corio Oval	16 June 1906
Collingwood	13.12 (90)	Melbourne	6.10 (46)	Victoria Park	16 June 1906
Carlton	4.15 (39)	Essendon	10.14 (74)	Princes Park	16 June 1906
South Melbourne	5.10 (40)	Fitzroy	9.8 (62)	Lake Oval	16 June 1906

=== Round 8 ===
Home team	Home team score	Away team	Away team score	Venue	Date
St Kilda	2.8 (20)	Fitzroy	3.7 (25)	Junction Oval	30 June 1906
South Melbourne	3.8 (26)	Essendon	8.11 (59)	Lake Oval	30 June 1906
Geelong	9.7 (61)	Collingwood	11.9 (75)	Corio Oval	30 June 1906
Melbourne	3.7 (25)	Carlton	9.16 (70)	MCG	30 June 1906

=== Round 9 ===
Home team	Home team score	Away team	Away team score	Venue	Date
Fitzroy	11.25 (91)	Melbourne	5.9 (39)	Brunswick Street Oval	7 July 1906
Essendon	16.16 (112)	Geelong	5.11 (41)	EMCG	7 July 1906
Collingwood	14.14 (98)	South Melbourne	5.8 (38)	Victoria Park	7 July 1906
Carlton	6.13 (49)	St Kilda	3.7 (25)	Princes Park	7 July 1906

=== Round 10 ===
Home team	Home team score	Away team	Away team score	Venue	Date
St Kilda	4.11 (35)	South Melbourne	4.4 (28)	Junction Oval	14 July 1906
Collingwood	6.8 (44)	Fitzroy	13.10 (88)	Victoria Park	14 July 1906
Melbourne	4.5 (29)	Essendon	13.17 (95)	MCG	14 July 1906
Geelong	5.6 (36)	Carlton	8.15 (63)	Corio Oval	14 July 1906

=== Round 11 ===
Home team	Home team score	Away team	Away team score	Venue	Date
Fitzroy	9.13 (67)	Geelong	5.7 (37)	Brunswick Street Oval	21 July 1906
Essendon	4.11 (35)	St Kilda	4.9 (33)	EMCG	21 July 1906
Carlton	11.14 (80)	Collingwood	6.7 (43)	Princes Park	21 July 1906
South Melbourne	12.11 (83)	Melbourne	4.3 (27)	Lake Oval	21 July 1906

=== Round 12 ===
Home team	Home team score	Away team	Away team score	Venue	Date
Geelong	6.21 (57)	Melbourne	6.10 (46)	Corio Oval	28 July 1906
Collingwood	11.16 (82)	St Kilda	2.8 (20)	Victoria Park	28 July 1906
Fitzroy	4.6 (30)	Essendon	5.8 (38)	Brunswick Street Oval	28 July 1906
South Melbourne	12.12 (84)	Carlton	7.3 (45)	Lake Oval	28 July 1906

=== Round 13 ===
Home team	Home team score	Away team	Away team score	Venue	Date
Collingwood	9.15 (69)	Essendon	5.7 (37)	Victoria Park	4 August 1906
South Melbourne	14.17 (101)	Geelong	5.8 (38)	Lake Oval	4 August 1906
Melbourne	5.10 (40)	St Kilda	10.13 (73)	MCG	11 August 1906
Carlton	5.3 (33)	Fitzroy	4.14 (38)	Princes Park	11 August 1906

=== Round 14 ===
Home team	Home team score	Away team	Away team score	Venue	Date
Fitzroy	13.11 (89)	South Melbourne	5.12 (42)	Brunswick Street Oval	18 August 1906
St Kilda	10.21 (81)	Geelong	3.13 (31)	Junction Oval	18 August 1906
Melbourne	6.5 (41)	Collingwood	15.14 (104)	MCG	18 August 1906
Essendon	4.12 (36)	Carlton	10.12 (72)	EMCG	18 August 1906

=== Pre-sectional ladder ===
Section A
Section B

#	Team	P	W	L	D	PF	PA	%	Pts
1	Carlton	14	11	3	0	922	641	143.8	44
2	Fitzroy	14	10	4	0	827	590	140.2	40
3	Essendon	14	10	4	0	832	629	132.3	40
4	Collingwood	14	9	5	0	1020	728	140.1	36
5	South Melbourne	14	6	8	0	790	800	98.8	24
6	St Kilda	14	5	9	0	603	720	83.8	20
7	Geelong	14	4	10	0	631	1003	62.9	16
8	Melbourne	14	1	13	0	584	1098	53.2	4

Rules for classification: 1. premiership points; 2. percentage; 3. points for
Source: AFL Tables

=== Round 15 (Sectional round 1) ===
	Round 15 (Sectional round 1)
Saturday, 25 August	Carlton 10.12 (72)	def.	Essendon 8.6 (54)	Princes Park
Saturday, 25 August	Collingwood 11.12 (78)	def.	St Kilda 7.19 (61)	Victoria Park
Saturday, 25 August	Melbourne 2.1 (13)	def. by	Fitzroy 17.18 (120)	Melbourne Cricket Ground
Saturday, 25 August	South Melbourne 10.10 (70)	def.	Geelong 7.7 (49)	Lake Oval

=== Round 16 (Sectional round 2) ===
	Round 16 (Sectional round 2)
Saturday, 1 September	Geelong 4.5 (29)	def. by	Carlton 13.13 (91)	Corio Oval
Saturday, 1 September	Fitzroy 5.8 (38)	def.	Collingwood 3.9 (27)	Brunswick Street Oval
Saturday, 1 September	Essendon 3.13 (31)	def. by	South Melbourne 10.6 (66)	East Melbourne Cricket Ground
Saturday, 1 September	St Kilda 10.12 (72)	def.	Melbourne 4.9 (33)	Junction Oval

=== Round 17 (Sectional round 3) ===
	Round 17 (Sectional round 3)
Saturday, 8 September	South Melbourne 4.15 (39)	def. by	Carlton 12.14 (86)	Lake Oval
Saturday, 8 September	Melbourne 7.9 (51)	def. by	Collingwood 15.17 (107)	Melbourne Cricket Ground
Saturday, 8 September	Geelong 9.12 (66)	def.	Essendon 5.12 (42)	Corio Oval
Saturday, 8 September	St Kilda 8.12 (60)	def. by	Fitzroy 11.7 (73)	Junction Oval

== Ladder ==
(P)	Premiers
	Qualified for finals

#	Team	P	W	L	D	PF	PA	%	Pts
1	Carlton (P)	17	14	3	0	1171	763	153.5	56
2	Fitzroy	17	13	4	0	1058	690	153.3	52
3	Collingwood	17	11	6	0	1232	878	140.3	44
4	Essendon	17	10	7	0	959	833	115.1	40
5	South Melbourne	17	8	9	0	965	966	99.9	32
6	St Kilda	17	6	11	0	796	904	88.1	24
7	Geelong	17	5	12	0	775	1206	64.3	20
8	Melbourne	17	1	16	0	681	1397	48.7	4

Rules for classification: 1. premiership points; 2. percentage; 3. points for
Average score: 56.2
Source: AFL Tables

== Finals series ==
=== Semi-finals ===
Home team	Home team score	Away team	Away team score	Venue	Date	
Fitzroy	10.12 (72)	Essendon	5.6 (36)	MCG	15 September 1906	Attendance: 8,500
Carlton	9.10 (64)	Collingwood	8.6 (54)	Brunswick Street Oval	15 September 1906	Attendance: 15,000

=== Grand final ===
Team	1 Qtr	2 Qtr	3 Qtr	Final
Carlton	3.2	7.4	9.4	15.4 (94)
Fitzroy	1.6	1.7	6.8	6.9 (45)

== Season notes ==
- In Round 4, St Kilda defeated Essendon for the first time in its history after 37 winless matches (16 in the VFA for five draws and 11 losses, and 21 in the VFL for one draw and 20 losses) over 21 years of competition (1878–1879 and 1888–1906).
- On Saturday 23 June, between Rounds 7 and 8, the VFL representative team 17.13 (115) defeated the Ballarat Football Association 10.10 (70) at the Melbourne Cricket Ground. Frank Caine kicked seven goals for Victoria. In the return game, held at the City Oval in Ballarat during the second week of Round 13 (11 August), the BFA 11.7 (73) defeated the VFL 6.7 (43); this VFL team was limited to players from Essendon, South Melbourne and Geelong, with the other five teams either playing or on interstate tours at the time. On 15 September, the weekend of the semi-finals, a VFL team selected from non-finalists defeated the Bendigo Football Association 15.14 (104) d. 2.2 (14) at the Upper Reserve in Bendigo.
- In Round 8, St Kilda formally protested the result of its five point loss against Fitzroy, on the grounds that the timekeeper had rung the final bell thirty seconds prematurely. The protest was dismissed three weeks later owing to a lack of evidence.
- A vacant Saturday was originally scheduled on 11 August in the fixture between Rounds 13 and 14, to accommodate the second game against Ballarat and to allow clubs to complete interstate tours. However, after South Australian club Norwood's tour was brought forward, the VFL turned Round 13 into a split round at less than two weeks notice, postponing the Carlton vs Fitzroy and St Kilda vs Melbourne games by a week.
- Mick Grace of Carlton was the first VFL player to score 50 goals in a season.

== Awards ==
- The 1906 VFL Premiership team was Carlton.
- The VFL's leading goalkicker was Mick Grace of Carlton with 50 goals.
- Melbourne took the "wooden spoon" in 1906.

== Sources ==
- 1906 VFL season at AFL Tables
- 1906 VFL season at Australian Football
