= 1936 SAAFL season =

1936 premiership season
- Date: 2 May - 19 September
- Premiers: A1: West Adelaide United; A2: Walkerville
- Runners-up: A1: Underdale; A2: Eastwood Rechabites
- Minor premiers: A1: West Adelaide United; A2: Walkerville
- Wooden spooners: A1: Goodwood; A2: Scotch O.C.
- Best and fairest: A1 (Hone Medal): Len Reeves (Kenilworth); A2 (Chambers Medal): Ivan Hooper (Pulteney O.S.)
- Leading goalkicker medallist: A1: Bill Hann (St. Peter's O.C.) 116 goals A2: Sid Maley (Walkerville) 155 goals

The 1936 SAAFL season was the 22nd season of the South Australian Amateur Football League (SAAFL).

The season commenced on 2 May and concluded on 19th September.

The Amateur League had five new clubs, plus the return of Y.M.C.A. after a year's absence. The new clubs were Christian Brothers Old Collegians, Holdens Motor Body Builders, Kings Old Collegians, Pulteney Old Scholars, and Walkerville. While two clubs did not re affiliate, Adelaide High Old Scholars and Kensington, as they both disbanded. Pulteney Old Scholars played at the Pulteney School oval in the South Parklands, Kings Old Collegians played at the Schools Haslam Oval, and Christian Brothers Old Collegians played at Rostrevor College. Walkerville, formerly in the North Adelaide District Football Association, played on Walkerville Oval. Holdens shared the Y.M.C.A.'s ground in the North Parklands. Kensington had disbanded at the end of 1935

In A1, three teams were promoted from A2, these being the Grand Finalists of 1935, West Adelaide United and Semaphore Central, as well as Prince Alfred O.C. The A1 and A2 competitions were able to have 10 teams each. However, after round 8, Goodwood withdrew from A1 and disbaned, and Scotch withdrew from A2 after round 10.

This season included the first Australian Amateur Football Carnival from 18 to 22 August at Adelaide Oval.

== A1 ==
St. Peter's Old Collegians, Underdale, Kenilworth, university, Exeter, Henley and Grange, Goodwood, West Adelaide United, Semaphore Central, and Prince Alfred Old Collegians.

=== Ladder ===
Pos	Team	Pld	W	L	PF	PA	Pts.
1	West Adelaide United	18	18	0	1756	1104	36
2	St. Peter's O.C.	18	14	4	1749	1200	28
3	Semaphore Central	18	14	4	1574	1144	28
4	Underdale	18	12	6	1744	1167	24
5	University	18	10	8	1498	1259	20
6	Kenilworth	18	9	9	1160	1303	18
7	Exeter	18	6	12	1273	1540	12
8	Prince Alfred O.C.	18	5	13	1359	1759	10
9	Henley and Grange	18	2	16	896	2333	4
10	Goodwood	18	0	18	260	944	0

=== Finals ===
==== Semi Finals ====
	Semi-finals
Saturday, 12 September	West Adelaide United 12.14	def.	Semaphore Central 10.11	Prospect Oval
Saturday, 12 September	St. Peter's Old Collegians 12.11	def. by	Underdale 16.15	Unley Oval

==== Final ====
Sir George Murray Shield
Saturday, 19 September	West Adelaide United	def.	Underdale	Thebarton Oval
3.6 (24); 7.12 (54); 9.16 (70); 11.19 (85)	Q1; Q2; Q3; Final	2.2 (14); 6.4 (40); 7.7 (49); 10.8 (68)	Umpires: F. Davis

== A2 ==
Rechabites, Alberton Church United, Old Scotch, Teachers' College, Walkerville, Y.M.C.A., Pulteney Old Scholars, Christian Brothers' Old Collegians, King's Old Collegians, Holden's Staff.

=== Ladder ===
Pos	Team	Pld	W	L	D	PF	PA	Pts.
1	Walkerville	18	17	1	0	2005	910	34
2	Rechabites	18	13	5	0	1539	1076	26
3	Alberton Church United	18	13	5	0	1303	1136	26
4	King's O.C.	18	11	6	1	1477	1349	23
5	Teachers' College	18	11	7	0	1350	1177	22
6	Christian Brothers O.C.	18	7	10	1	1263	1452	15
7	Pulteney O.S.	18	6	12	0	1144	1520	12
8	Holden's	18	5	13	0	964	1442	10
9	Y.M.C.A.	18	5	13	0	755	1757	10
10	Old Scotch	18	1	17	0	496	1097	2

=== Finals ===
==== Semi Finals ====
	Semi-finals
Saturday, 12 September	Walkerville 17.13	def.	Alberton Church United 10.5	Alberton Oval
Saturday, 12 September	Rechabites 25.15	def.	King's Old Collegians 15.10	Walkerville Oval

==== Final ====
Mark Mitchell Shield
Saturday, 19 September	Walkerville	def.	Rechabite	Prospect Oval
13.9 (87)	Q1; Q2; Q3; Final	10.6 (66)
Hemers 5, Eldridge 3, Hawke 3, Maley 2	Goals

== Representative ==
=== King's Birthday ===
Due to the Australian Amateur Football Carnival being played in August, the King's Birthday holiday, 29 June, was used as a selection trial game with a combined A1 vs A2.

A1 vs A2
Monday, June 29	Blacks	def. by	Whites	St. Peter's College
4.5; 5.8; 7.9; 12.11 (83)	Q1; Q2; Q3; Final	3.9; 7.13; 10.15; 13.21 (99)
Maley 3, Lee 2, Masters 2, Amos 2, Hooper 2, Holden	Goals	McKnight 7, Keville 3, Fredrichs 2, Gunn

=== Australian Amateur Football Carnival ===
The members of the Australian Amateur Football Council, South Australia, Tasmania, and Victoria were represented. As well as invitations to Western Australia Amateur Football League, New South Wales National Football League and Queensland Australian Football League. The Queensland league dropped out. The carnival was held 18–22 August at Adelaide Oval.

==== 18th August ====
Tuesday, 18 August (12:30 pm)	Victoria	def.	Tasmania	Adelaide Oval
6.1; 13.2; 21.7; 27.15	Q1; Q2; Q3; Final	1.1; 1.1; 4.1; 6.3
Mason-Cox 9, Chandler 7, Bray 3, Scott 2, Morley 2, Ryan 2, Standish, Guthrie	Goals	Waddle 2, Hill 2, Palfreyman, Mulligan

Tuesday, 18 August (3:00 pm)	South Australia	def.	New South Wales	Adelaide Oval
8.4; 10.6; 16.11; 25.11	Q1; Q2; Q3; Final	2.3; 6.9; 10.9; 14.13
R. Keane 8, R.A. Lee 7, K. Brown 4, L. Juttnera 4, N.C. Friedrichs, J. Bellhouse	Goals	J. Phelan 4, N. Holmes 3, W. Ludlow 3, M. Stiff 2, C. Boehm, H. Crowhurst

==== 19th August ====
Wednesday, 19 August (2:30 pm)	Victoria	def.	West Australia	Adelaide Oval
2.3; 6.5; 9.9; 11.13	Q1; Q2; Q3; Final	0.1; 1.3; 1.5; 3.8
Mason-Cox 5, Morley 2, Vontom, Taylor, Standish, Chandler	Goals	Nicholls 2, Street

==== 20th August ====
Thursday, 20 August (2:50 pm)	New South Wales	def.	Tasmania	Adelaide Oval
8.3 (51); 12.6 (78); 16.8; 18.24	Q1; Q2; Q3; Final	1.3 (9); 5.6 (36); 9.16; 12.17
Phelan 11, Holmes 2, Stiff 2, Ludlow, Boehm, Eyre	Goals	Palfreyman 5, Andrews 2, McIntee 2, Armstrong, Hill, Waddle

==== 21st August ====
Friday, 21 August (2:50 pm)	Western Australia	def. by	Tasmania	Adelaide Oval
4.6; 7.11; 9.15; 10.19	Q1; Q2; Q3; Final	6.3; 8.4; 10.8; 14.14
Nicholls 3, Withers 2, Kenneally 2, Hosken, Hughes	Goals	Andrews 5, Palfreyman 4, Waddle 2, Clemens, Hill, McIntee

==== 22nd August ====
Saturday, 22 August (12:30 pm)	New South Wales	def.	Western Australia	Adelaide Oval
4.3; 7.8; 10.13; 17.16 (118)	Q1; Q2; Q3; Final	3.3; 5.4; 7.6; 8.10 (58)
Phelan 11, Stiff 2, Ludlow 2, James, Holmes	Goals	Groom 3, Williams, Nicholls, Hughes, Street, Kenneally

Saturday, 22 August (3:00 pm)	South Australia	def. by	Victoria	Adelaide Oval
4.2; 8.9; 10.11; 16.14 (110)	Q1; Q2; Q3; Final	3.0; 9.1; 16.5; 18.7 (115)
Keane 5, Lee 5, Friedrichs 3, Brown 2, Stevens	Goals	Pearson 11, Scott 2, Mason-Cox 2, Vontrom 2, Nilan
