= George Lockwood =

Australian rules footballer

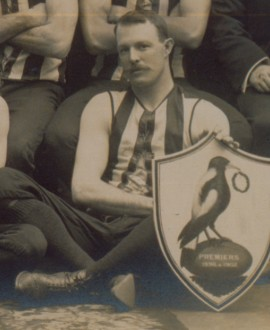
- Lockwood in 1902

Personal information
- Full name: George Lockwood
- Born: 6 December 1872; Geelong
- Died: 1946 (aged 73)
- Original team: East Fremantle

Playing career^{1}
Years	Club	Games (Goals)
1899–1901	Geelong	40 (7)
1902–1904	Collingwood	29 (2)
Total		69 (9)
- ^{1} Playing statistics correct to the end of 1904.

Career highlights
- 2× VFL premiership player: 1902, 1903

George Lockwood (6 December 1872 - 1946) was an Australian rules footballer who played for the Geelong Football Club and Collingwood Football Club in the Victorian Football League (VFL). He was originally from the Geelong area, but came to the VFL from the East Fremantle Football Club.

== Family ==
The sons of Thomas Lockwood (1821-1876), and Charlotte Lockwood (1843-1884), née Chambers (later Mrs. William Moorhouse Hardman), George Lockwood and his twin brother Edward Lockwood (1872–1953) were born at Geelong on 6 December 1872.

== Football ==
George and his twin brother "Teddy" were the first pair of twins to play VFL football. Their careers also mirrored each other's, with both starting at Geelong in 1899 and crossing to Collingwood in 1902. George Lockwood usually played in the back pocket and was a member of Collingwood premiership sides in 1902 and 1903.
