= List of VFL/AFL minor premiers =

This page is a complete chronological listing of VFL/AFL minor premiers. The Australian Football League (AFL), known as the Victorian Football League (VFL) until 1989, is the elite national competition in men's Australian rules football.

The team that finishes the home-and-away season on top of the premiership ladder is known as the "minor premier"; unlike many other sports and competitions, in Australian rules football culture, minor premierships have far less significance than the premiership. In the AFL, finishing on top of the ladder provides seeding benefits during the finals series, while the main league award is the premiership, which is awarded to the winner of the grand final; between 1991 and 2022, the McClelland Trophy was also awarded to the minor premier.

As of 2025, 67 minor premiers have won the VFL/AFL premiership and 44 have finished as runners-up. 18 failed to qualify for the grand final, with 17 finishing third and one finishing fifth. The success rate of minor premiers winning the major premiership has reduced greatly since 1994, when the finals series was expanded to eight clubs and the benefits enjoyed by the minor premier in bye weeks and double-chances during the finals were reduced and diluted.

== List of minor premiers ==
The following is a list of minor premiers, ladder details and results.

Season	Minor premier	Points	Percentage	Second place	Margin	Final result	Premiers
1897	Geelong	44	184.3	Essendon	25.3%	Runners-up	Essendon
1898	Essendon	44	202.1	Collingwood	4 points	Runners-up	Fitzroy
1899	Fitzroy	44	153.3	Geelong	4 points	Premiers	
1900	Fitzroy (2)	44	168.0	Geelong	8 points	Runners-up	Melbourne
1901	Geelong (2)	56	142.9	Essendon	8 points	Third	Essendon
1902	Collingwood	60	199.5	Essendon	8 points	Premiers	
1903	Collingwood (2)	60	159.4	Fitzroy	4 points	Premiers	
1904	Fitzroy (3)	48	128.2	Carlton	6 points	Premiers	
1905	Collingwood (3)	60	175.0	Fitzroy	10 points	Runners-up	Fitzroy
1906	Carlton	56	153.5	Fitzroy	4 points	Premiers	
1907	Carlton (2)	52	155.7	South Melbourne	8 points	Premiers	
1908	Carlton (3)	68	169.4	Essendon	12 points	Premiers	
1909	South Melbourne	56	168.9	Carlton	22.1%	Premiers	
1910	Carlton (4)	60	160.1	Collingwood	8 points	Runners-up	Collingwood
1911	Essendon (2)	62	178.3	South Melbourne	8 points	Premiers	
1912	South Melbourne (2)	56	157.0	Carlton	25.8%	Runners-up	Essendon
1913	Fitzroy (4)	64	144.3	South Melbourne	6 points	Premiers	
1914	Carlton (5)	56	129.7	South Melbourne	6 points	Premiers	
1915	Collingwood (4)	56	166.1	Carlton	2 points	Runners-up	Carlton
1916	Carlton (6)	40	137.2	Collingwood	14 points	Runners-up	Fitzroy
1917	Collingwood (5)	42	133.4	Carlton	4 points	Premiers	
1918	South Melbourne (3)	52	143.1	Collingwood	12 points	Premiers	
1919	Collingwood (6)	52	162.3	South Melbourne	4 points	Premiers	
1920	Richmond	56	146.4	Fitzroy	3.2%	Premiers	
1921	Carlton (7)	56	142.0	Richmond	8 points	Runners-up	Richmond
1922	Collingwood (7)	48	127.8	Essendon	6 points	Runners-up	Fitzroy
1923	Essendon (3)	52	135.8	Fitzroy	8 points	Premiers	
1924	Essendon (4)	46	131.6	South Melbourne	2 points	Premiers	
1925	Geelong (3)	60	152.7	Essendon	8 points	Premiers	
1926	Collingwood (8)	60	149.3	Geelong	4.1%	Runners-up	Melbourne
1927	Collingwood (9)	60	150.6	Richmond	4 points	Premiers	
1928	Collingwood (10)	60	134.6	Richmond	4 points	Premiers	
1929	Collingwood (11)	72	171.7	Carlton	12 points	Premiers	
1930	Collingwood (12)	60	144.3	Carlton	2.7%	Premiers	
1931	Geelong (4)	60	151.4	Richmond	10.3%	Premiers	
1932	Carlton (8)	60	137.8	Richmond	2 points	Runners-up	Richmond
1933	Richmond (2)	60	141.1	South Melbourne	8 points	Runners-up	South Melbourne
1934	Richmond (3)	60	121.3	Geelong	2 points	Premiers	
1935	South Melbourne (4)	64	137.6	Collingwood	4 points	Runners-up	Collingwood
1936	South Melbourne (5)	64	118.5	Collingwood	4 points	Runners-up	Collingwood
1937	Geelong (5)	60	135.3	Melbourne	4.1%	Premiers	
1938	Carlton (9)	56	116.1	Geelong	4 points	Premiers	
1939	Melbourne	60	128.4	Collingwood	6.4%	Premiers	
1940	Melbourne (2)	56	125.8	Richmond	8 points	Premiers	
1941	Carlton (10)	56	120.3	Melbourne	3.1%	Third	Melbourne
1942	Essendon (5)	52	127.1	Richmond	4 points	Premiers	
1943	Richmond (4)	44	123.1	Essendon	7.9%	Premiers	
1944	Richmond (5)	54	131.1	Fitzroy	0.1%	Runners-up	Fitzroy
1945	South Melbourne (6)	64	131.8	Collingwood	4 points	Runners-up	Carlton
1946	Essendon (6)	60	140.7	Collingwood	8 points	Premiers	
1947	Carlton (11)	60	134.0	Essendon	4 points	Premiers	
1948	Essendon (7)	66	137.2	Melbourne	14 points	Runners-up	Melbourne
1949	North Melbourne	56	119.1	Carlton	4 points	Third	Essendon
1950	Essendon (8)	68	162.2	North Melbourne	16 points	Premiers	
1951	Geelong (6)	56	135.4	Collingwood	9.8%	Premiers	
1952	Geelong (7)	66	134.7	Collingwood	10 points	Premiers	
1953	Geelong (8)	60	143.3	Collingwood	4 points	Runners-up	Collingwood
1954	Geelong (9)	52	133.1	Footscray	6 points	Third	Footscray
1955	Melbourne (3)	60	150.5	Collingwood	4 points	Premiers	
1956	Melbourne (4)	64	146.0	Collingwood	12 points	Premiers	
1957	Melbourne (5)	50	138.8	Essendon	6 points	Premiers	
1958	Melbourne (6)	60	123.7	Collingwood	12 points	Runners-up	Collingwood
1959	Melbourne (7)	54	142.7	Carlton	2 points	Premiers	
1960	Melbourne (8)	56	143.1	Fitzroy	30.6%	Premiers	
1961	Hawthorn	56	125.1	Melbourne	6 points	Premiers	
1962	Essendon (9)	64	130.4	Geelong	8 points	Premiers	
1963	Hawthorn (2)	54	130.6	Geelong	2.4%	Runners-up	Geelong
1964	Melbourne (9)	56	138.1	Collingwood	2 points	Premiers	
1965	St Kilda	56	136.3	Collingwood	4 points	Runners-up	Essendon
1966	Collingwood (13)	60	157.2	St Kilda	4 points	Runners-up	St Kilda
1967	Richmond (6)	60	145.9	Carlton	2 points	Premiers	
1968	Essendon (10)	66	130.3	Carlton	6 points	Runners-up	Carlton
1969	Collingwood (14)	60	129.0	Carlton	8.5%	Third	Richmond
1970	Collingwood (15)	72	136.5	Carlton	8 points	Runners-up	Carlton
1971	Hawthorn (3)	76	153.7	St Kilda	12 points	Premiers	
1972	Carlton (12)	74	134.3	Richmond	2 points	Premiers	
1973	Collingwood (16)	76	125.5	Richmond	8 points	Third	Richmond
1974	Richmond (7)	68	129.3	North Melbourne	4 points	Premiers	
1975	Hawthorn (4)	68	137.3	Carlton	4 points	Runners-up	North Melbourne
1976	Carlton (13)	66	132.8	Hawthorn	2 points	Third	Hawthorn
1977	Collingwood (17)	72	130.7	Hawthorn	4 points	Runners-up	North Melbourne
1978	North Melbourne (2)	64	120.9	Hawthorn	3.2%	Runners-up	Hawthorn
1979	Carlton (14)	76	139.6	North Melbourne	8 points	Premiers	
1980	Geelong (10)	68	125.1	Carlton	4.0%	Third	Richmond
1981	Carlton (15)	68	130.3	Collingwood	7.7%	Premiers	
1982	Richmond (8)	72	126.2	Hawthorn	4 points	Runners-up	Carlton
1983	North Melbourne (3)	64	127.8	Hawthorn	4 points	Third	Hawthorn
1984	Essendon (11)	72	128.2	Hawthorn	4 points	Premiers	
1985	Essendon (12)	76	138.4	Footscray	12 points	Premiers	
1986	Hawthorn (5)	72	141.6	Sydney	8 points	Premiers	
1987	Carlton (16)	72	138.0	Hawthorn	4 points	Premiers	
1988	Hawthorn (6)	76	142.3	Collingwood	14 points	Premiers	
1989	Hawthorn (7)	76	153.2	Essendon	8 points	Premiers	
1990	Essendon (13)	68	139.2	Collingwood	4 points	Runners-up	Collingwood
1991	West Coast	76	162.2	Hawthorn	12 points	Runners-up	Hawthorn
1992	Geelong (11)	64	145.6	Footscray	15.8%	Runners-up	West Coast
1993	Essendon (14)	54	119.1	Carlton	1.5%	Premiers	
1994	West Coast (2)	64	132.2	Carlton	4 points	Premiers	
1995	Carlton (17)	80	137.8	Geelong	16 points	Premiers	
1996	Sydney (7)	66	123.9	North Melbourne	2 points	Runners-up	North Melbourne
1997	St Kilda (2)	60	119.6	Geelong	1.7%	Runners-up	Adelaide
1998	North Melbourne (4)	64	117.4	Western Bulldogs	4 points	Runners-up	Adelaide
1999	Essendon (15)	72	126.0	Kangaroos	4 points	Third	Kangaroos
2000	Essendon (16)	84	159.1	Carlton	20 points	Premiers	
2001	Essendon (17)	68	134.5	Brisbane Lions	6.9%	Runners-up	Brisbane Lions
2002	Port Adelaide	72	132.4	Brisbane Lions	4 points	Third	Brisbane Lions
2003	Port Adelaide (2)	72	127.2	Collingwood	12 points	Third	Brisbane Lions
2004	Port Adelaide (3)	68	132.4	Brisbane Lions	4 points	Premiers	
2005	Adelaide	68	136.5	West Coast	12.5%	Third	Sydney
2006	West Coast (3)	68	120.4	Adelaide	4 points	Premiers	
2007	Geelong (12)	72	152.8	Port Adelaide	12 points	Premiers	
2008	Geelong (13)	84	161.8	Hawthorn	16 points	Runners-up	Hawthorn
2009	St Kilda (3)	80	155.7	Geelong	8 points	Runners-up	Geelong
2010	Collingwood (18)	70	141.7	Geelong	2 points	Premiers	
2011	Collingwood (19)	80	167.7	Geelong	4 points	Runners-up	Geelong
2012	Hawthorn (8)	68	154.6	Adelaide	22.1%	Runners-up	Sydney
2013	Hawthorn (9)	76	135.7	Geelong	4 points	Premiers	
2014	Sydney (8)	68	142.9	Hawthorn	2.1%	Runners-up	Hawthorn
2015	Fremantle	68	118.7	West Coast	2 points	Third	Hawthorn
2016	Sydney (9)	68	158.8	Geelong	7.4%	Runners-up	Western Bulldogs
2017	Adelaide (2)	62	136.0	Geelong	18.6%	Runners-up	Richmond
2018	Richmond (9)	72	136.1	West Coast	8 points	Third	West Coast
2019	Geelong (14)	64	135.7	Brisbane Lions	17.4%	Third	Richmond
2020	Port Adelaide (4)	56	136.4	Brisbane Lions	11.5%	Third	Richmond
2021	Melbourne (10)	70	130.8	Port Adelaide	2 points	Premiers	
2022	Geelong (15)	72	144.3	Melbourne	8 points	Premiers	
2023	Collingwood (20)	72	127.0	Brisbane Lions	4 points	Premiers	
2024	Sydney (10)	68	126.7	Port Adelaide	4 points	Runners-up	Brisbane Lions
2025	Adelaide (3)	72	139.3	Geelong	4 points	Fifth	Brisbane Lions
2026	Fremantle (2)	76	137.2	Sydney	4 points	Runners-up	Brisbane Lions

== Minor premiership wins ==
Club	Years in competition	Minor premierships	Most recent	Premiers in same year
Collingwood	1897–present	20	2023	10
Carlton	1897–present	17	1995	11
Essendon	1897–present	17	2001	11
Geelong	1897–present	15	2022	7
Melbourne	1897–present	10	2021	9
South Melbourne/Sydney	1897–present	10	2024	2
Hawthorn	1925–present	9	2013	6
Richmond	1908–present	9	2018	5
Fitzroy	1897–1996	4	1913	3
Port Adelaide	1997–present	4	2020	1
North Melbourne/Kangaroos	1925–present	4	1998	0
West Coast	1987–present	3	2006	2
St Kilda	1897–present	3	2009	0
Adelaide	1991–present	3	2025	0
Fremantle	1995–present	2	2026	0
Footscray/Western Bulldogs	1925–present	0	—	—
Brisbane Lions	1997–present	0	—	—
Gold Coast	2011–present	0	—	—
Greater Western Sydney	2012–present	0	—	—
University	1908–1914	0	—	—
Brisbane Bears	1987–1996	0	—	—

== Minor premiership records ==
- Most consecutive minor premierships: 6 (Melbourne, 1955–1960)
- Longest minor premiership drought: 100 years (Footscray/Western Bulldogs; never won a minor premiership)

== See also ==
- List of VFL/AFL premiers
- List of AFL Women's minor premiers
