= Coleman Medal =

Australian rules football award

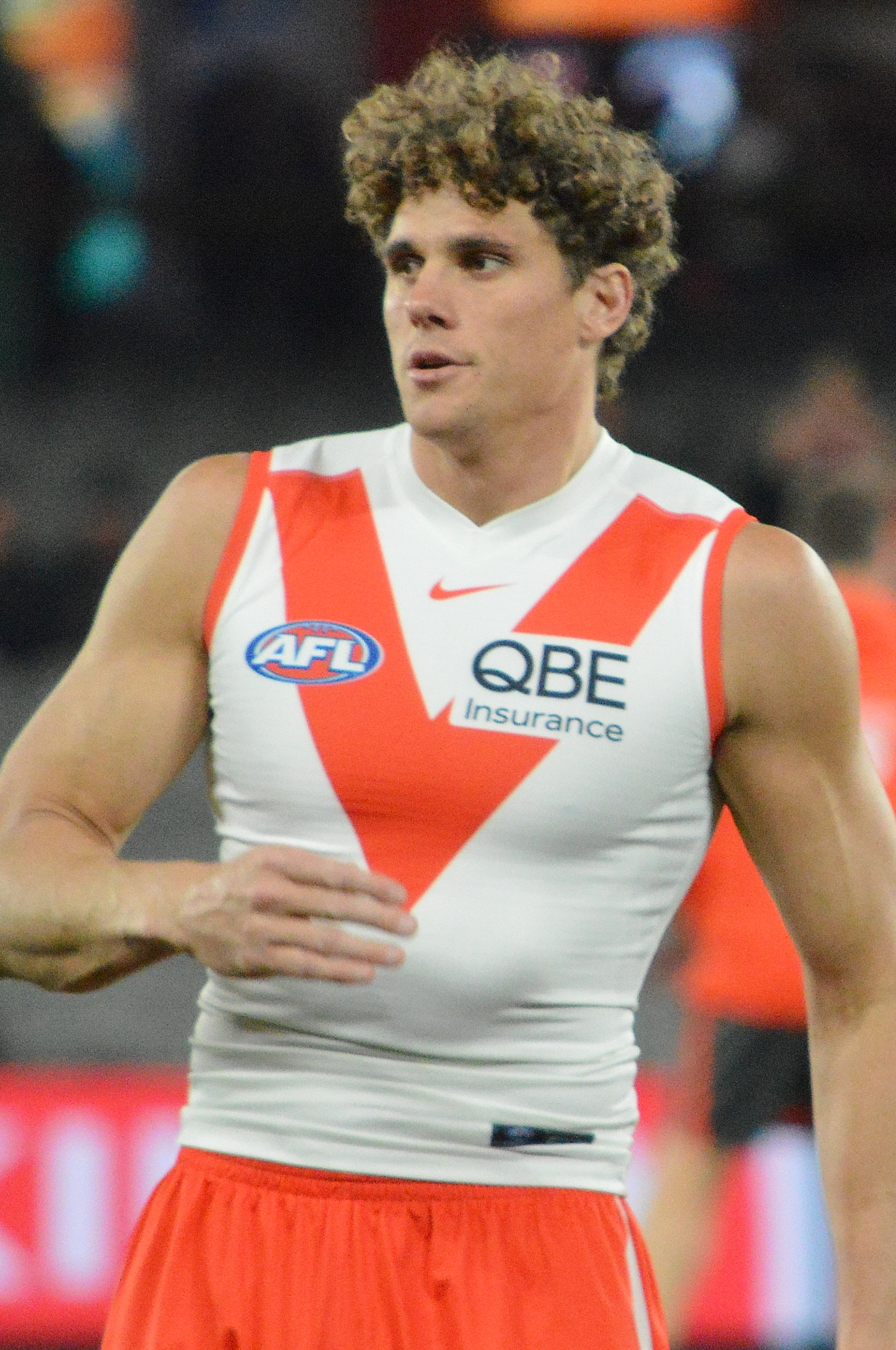
- Charlie Curnow, 2026 winner
- League: Australian Football League
- Awarded for: Most goals in the home-and-away season

History
- Most wins: Dick Lee (7)
- Most recent: Charlie Curnow (Sydney)

The Coleman Medal is an Australian rules football award given annually to the Australian Football League (AFL) player who kicks the most goals in the home-and-away season. It is named after Essendon full-forward John Coleman, one of the most prolific goalkickers in the league's history, who was league leading goalkicker for five consecutive seasons.

The medal has been presented at various different events, including the preliminary and grand finals, the All-Australian awards ceremony, and club award ceremonies. Sydney's Charlie Curnow is the most recent recipient, kicking 69 goals in 2026.

== History ==
The award was first presented in 1981 to Richmond's Michael Roach. At the time, the competition was known as the Victorian Football League (VFL); it would become the AFL in 1990. It was named after John Coleman, a full- forward and Australian Football Hall of Fame Legend who scored 537 goals in 98 games for Essendon between 1949 and 1954.

In September 2001, the AFL decided to recognise all leading goalkickers prior to Roach's victory; leaders from 1955—the year after Coleman's last match—to 1980 were named retrospective Coleman Medallists, while winners prior to 1955 were named Leading Goalkicker Medallists. Medals were presented to winners or their surviving relatives in a ceremony at Melbourne Town Hall in July 2004. Jack Collins, who had been a leading advocate for naming the award after Coleman and honouring leading goalkickers prior to 1981, was the only player to receive both a Coleman and a Leading Goalkicker Medal. Upon receiving the accolades, he was "bloody angry" and complained to the AFL Commission, as he perceived the Leading Goalkicker Medal to be an inferior award.

Collingwood is the club most frequently represented by Coleman and Leading Goalkicker Medallists: its players have won on 23 occasions, six clear of Geelong's tally of 17. The majority of Collingwood's awards were contributed by Dick Lee (7) and Gordon Coventry (6), which stand as the most and second-most in league history. Coleman himself won the Leading Goalkicker Medals in all five of his complete VFL seasons to have the third-most. As of 2023, there have been five four-time medallists, five three-time medallists, and 16 dual medallists.

== Recipients ==
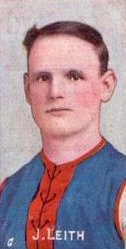
Jack Leith tied with Eddy James for the most goals (22) in 1897, the VFL's inaugural season.

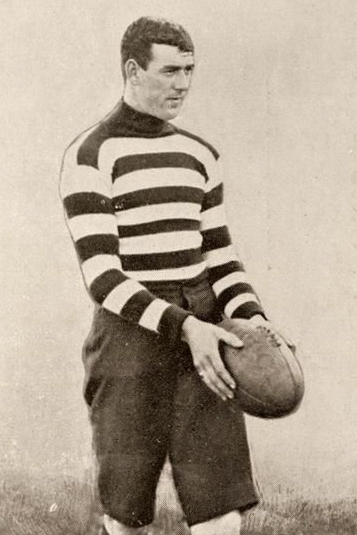
Percy Martini was retrospectively awarded a Leading Goalkicker Medal for his 51-goal performance in 1910.

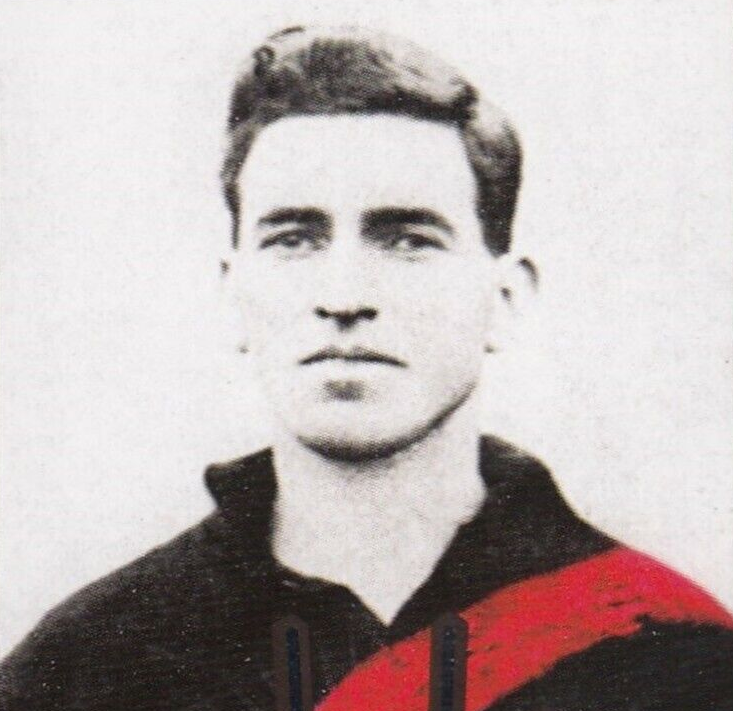
Greg Stockdale's 68-goal haul for the 1923 season from just 18 out of 19 games broke the league record (when including finals). Stockdale would go on to be Essendon's leading goalkicker in three seasons between 1923 and 1928.

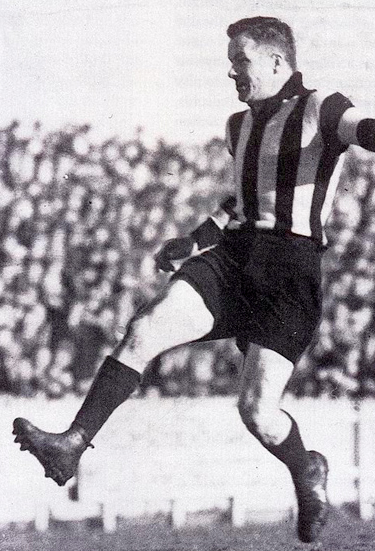
Gordon Coventry led the VFL in goalkicking six times, including five consecutive occasions from 1926 to 1930.

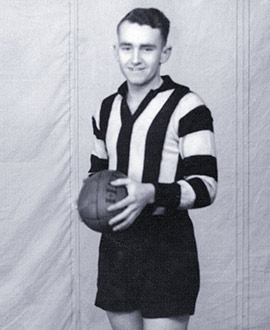
Des Fothergill scored the most goals (63) in the 1946 VFL season.

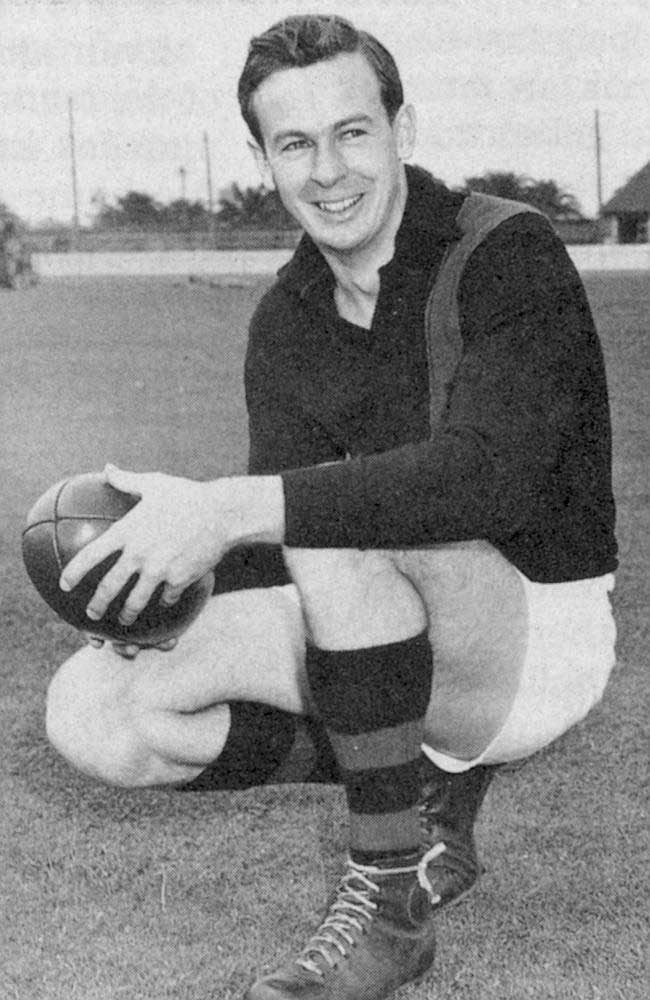
John Coleman, the namesake of the medal, led the VFL in goalkicking five times in a row (1949–1953).

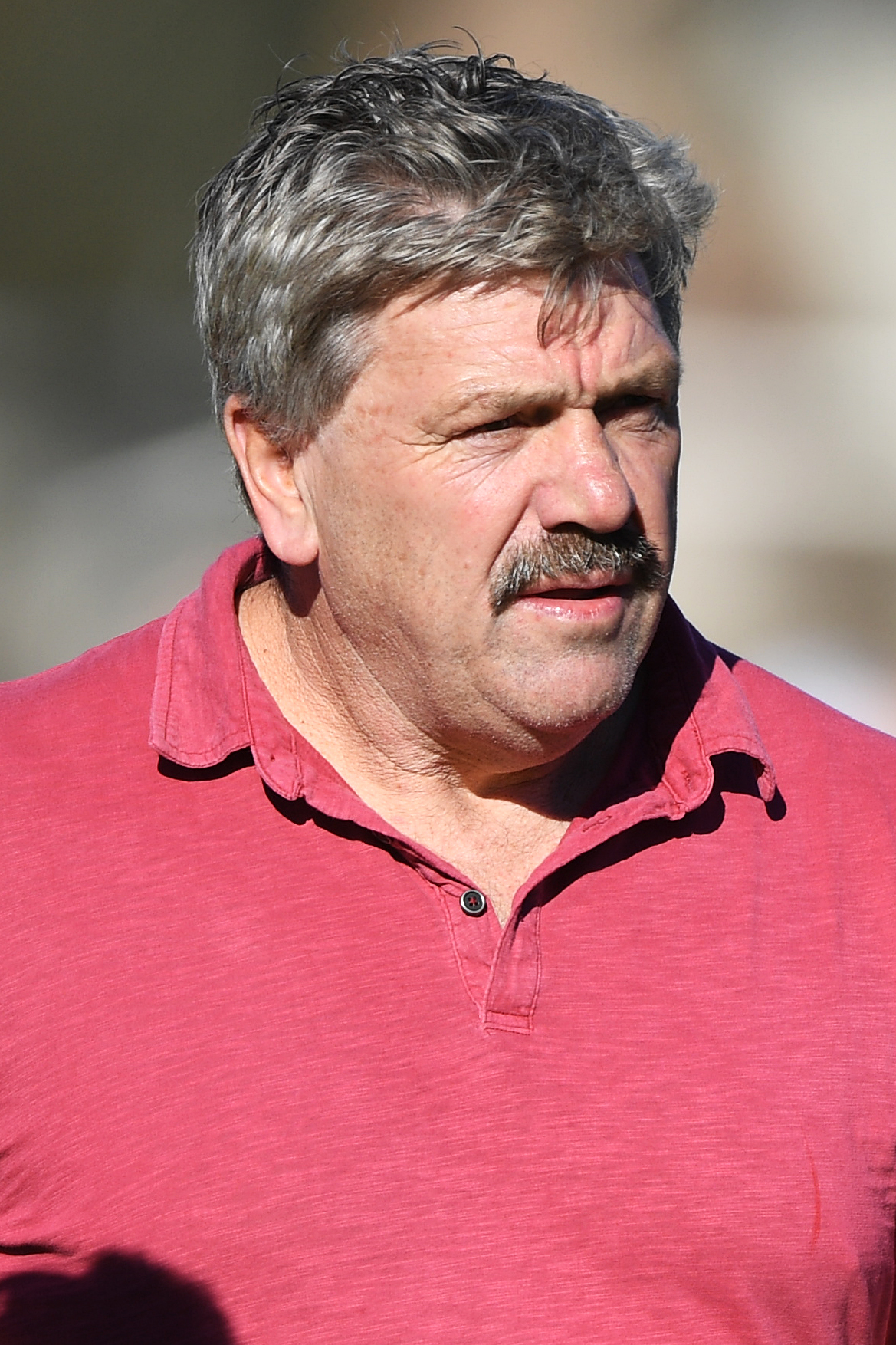
Brian Taylor scored 100 goals in 1986, winning the season's Coleman Medal.

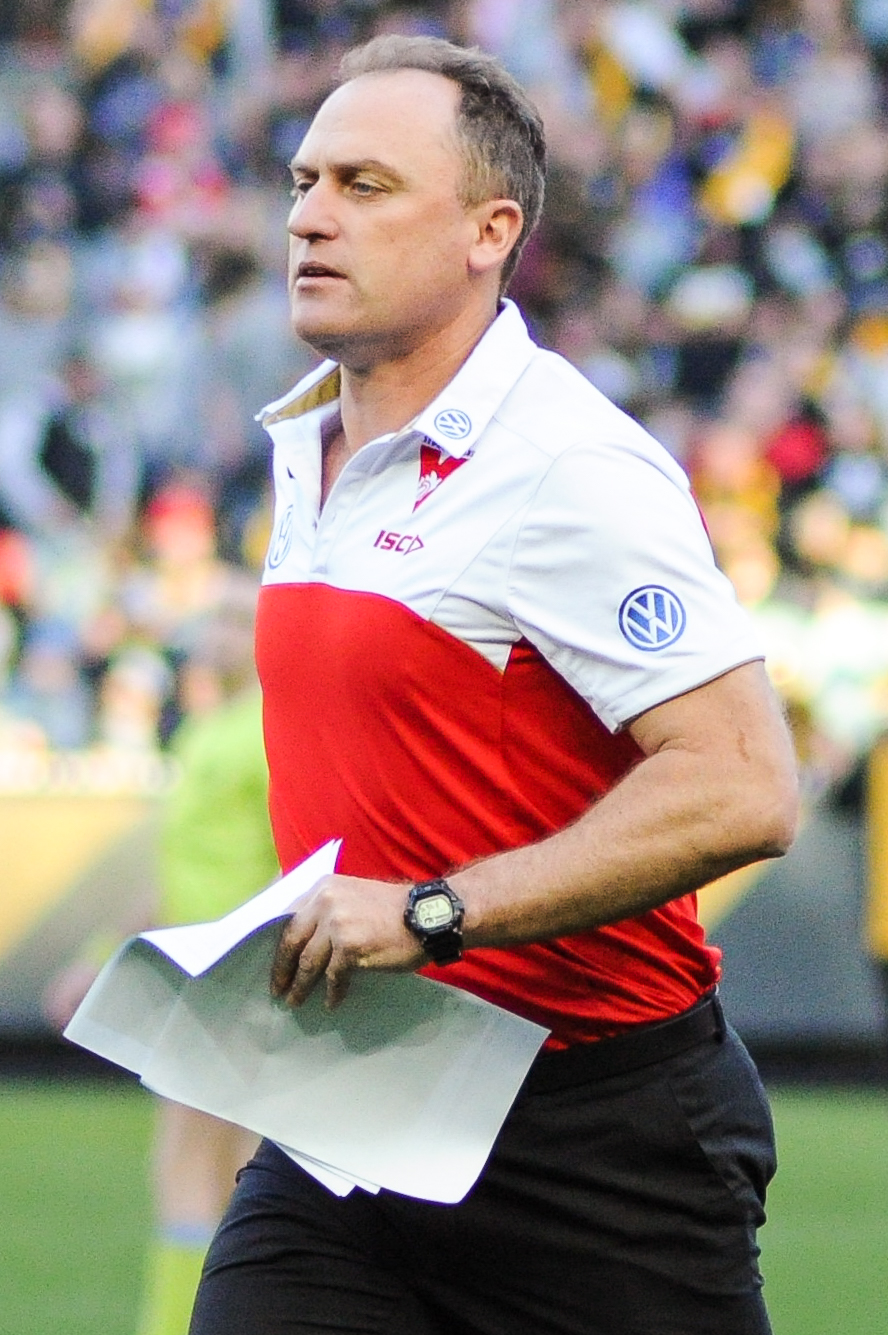
John Longmire led the AFL in goalkicking for 1990 at the age of 19, making him the youngest Coleman Medallist.

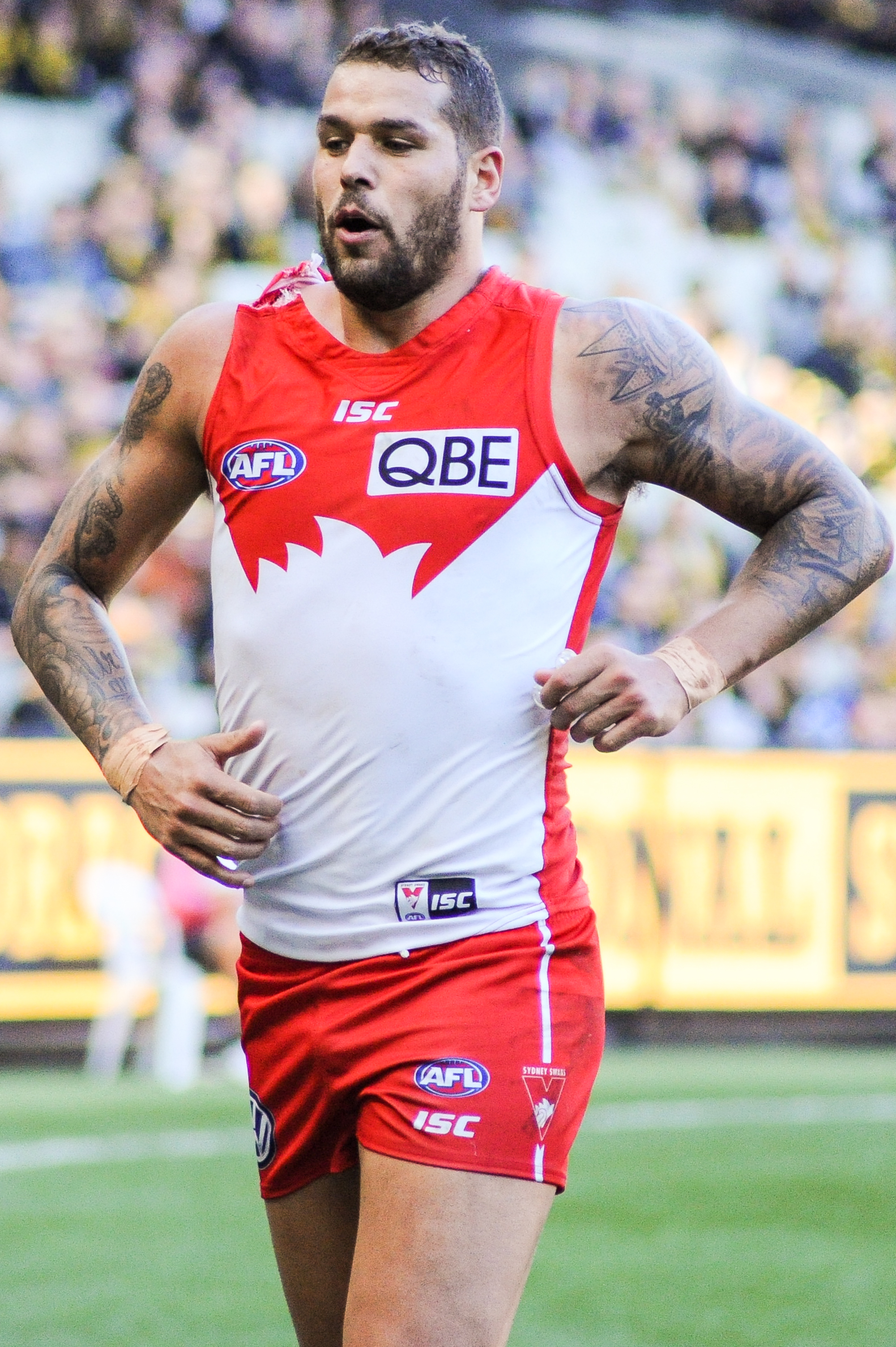
Lance Franklin (pictured playing for Sydney) has won four Coleman Medals at two clubs: Hawthorn (2008, 2011) and Sydney (2014, 2017).

Note: **Bold text** denotes player currently plays in the AFL

Table of recipients (Note: The following websites are used as sources for recipients: AFL.com.au; AFL Tables; Conflicts arise between the sources on three occasions; an additional source for each dispute is provided: 1910: AFL.com.au notes Dick Lee as joint leading goalkicker. AFL Tables omits Lee, supported by the 2018 Grand Final edition of the AFL Record.; 1977: AFL.com.au gives Hudson's goal total as 105. AFL Tables records 99, supported by the 2015 Grand Final edition of the AFL Record.; 2004: AFL.com.au gives Gehrig's goal total as 103. AFL Tables records 90, supported by ABC News; the difference is because the AFL erroneously implies Gehrig got 103 goals to win the medal, but these extra 13 goals were kicked in finals and therefore are not included in this list.)
Recipient	Year	Club	Goals
Eddy James	1897	Geelong	22
Jack Leith	1897	Melbourne	22
Archie Smith	1898	Collingwood	31
Eddy James (2)	1899	Geelong	31
Teddy Lockwood	1900	Geelong	24
Albert Thurgood	1900	Essendon	24
Fred Hiskins	1901	Essendon	34
Charlie Baker	1902	St Kilda	30
Teddy Lockwood (2)	1903	Collingwood	33
Vince Coutie	1904	Melbourne	39
Charlie Pannam	1905	Collingwood	38
Mick Grace	1906	Carlton	45
Dick Lee	1907	Collingwood	45
Dick Lee (2)	1908	Collingwood	50
Dick Lee (3)	1909	Collingwood	55
Percy Martini	1910	Geelong	51
Harry Brereton	1911	Melbourne	46
Harry Brereton (2)	1912	Melbourne	56
Roy Park	1913	University	53
Dick Lee (4)	1914	Collingwood	57
Jimmy Freake	1915	Fitzroy	65
Dick Lee (5)	1916	Collingwood	46
Dick Lee (6)	1917	Collingwood	50
Ern Cowley	1918	Carlton	35
Dick Lee (7)	1919	Collingwood	47
George Bayliss	1920	Richmond	62
Cliff Rankin	1921	Geelong	61
Horrie Clover	1922	Carlton	54
Greg Stockdale	1923	Essendon	64
Jack Moriarty	1924	Fitzroy	75
Lloyd Hagger	1925	Geelong	70
Gordon Coventry	1926	Collingwood	78
Gordon Coventry (2)	1927	Collingwood	88
Gordon Coventry (3)	1928	Collingwood	78
Gordon Coventry (4)	1929	Collingwood	118
Gordon Coventry (5)	1930	Collingwood	105
Harry Vallence	1931	Carlton	72
George Moloney	1932	Geelong	109
Gordon Coventry (6)	1933	Collingwood	108
Bob Pratt	1934	South Melbourne	138
Bob Pratt (2)	1935	South Melbourne	97
Bill Mohr	1936	St Kilda	101
Dick Harris	1937	Richmond	64
Ron Todd	1938	Collingwood	102
Ron Todd (2)	1939	Collingwood	98
Jack Titus	1940	Richmond	92
Sel Murray	1941	North Melbourne	88
Lindsay White	1942	South Melbourne	67
Fred Fanning	1943	Melbourne	62
Fred Fanning (2)	1944	Melbourne	87
Fred Fanning (3)	1945	Melbourne	67
Des Fothergill	1946	Collingwood	63
Fred Fanning (4)	1947	Melbourne	97
Lindsay White (2)	1948	Geelong	86
John Coleman	1949	Essendon	85
John Coleman (2)	1950	Essendon	112
John Coleman (3)	1951	Essendon	75
John Coleman (4)	1952	Essendon	103
John Coleman (5)	1953	Essendon	96
Jack Collins	1954	Footscray	73
Noel Rayson	1955	Geelong	77
Bill Young	1956	St Kilda	56
Jack Collins (2)	1957	Footscray	74
Ian Brewer	1958	Collingwood	67
Ron Evans	1959	Essendon	69
Ron Evans (2)	1960	Essendon	67
Tom Carroll	1961	Carlton	54
Doug Wade	1962	Geelong	62
John Peck	1963	Hawthorn	69
John Peck (2)	1964	Hawthorn	68
John Peck (3)	1965	Hawthorn	56
Ted Fordham	1966	Essendon	73
Doug Wade (2)	1967	Geelong	79
Peter Hudson	1968	Hawthorn	125
Doug Wade (3)	1969	Geelong	122
Peter Hudson (2)	1970	Hawthorn	146
Peter Hudson (3)	1971	Hawthorn	140
Peter McKenna	1972	Collingwood	130
Peter McKenna (2)	1973	Collingwood	84
Doug Wade (4)	1974	North Melbourne	91
Leigh Matthews	1975	Hawthorn	67
Larry Donohue	1976	Geelong	99
Peter Hudson (4)	1977	Hawthorn	105
Kelvin Templeton	1978	Footscray	118
Kelvin Templeton (2)	1979	Footscray	91
Michael Roach	1980	Richmond	107
Michael Roach (2)	1981	Richmond	86
Malcolm Blight	1982	North Melbourne	94
Bernie Quinlan	1983	Fitzroy	106
Bernie Quinlan (2)	1984	Fitzroy	102
Simon Beasley	1985	Footscray	93
Brian Taylor	1986	Collingwood	100
Tony Lockett	1987	St Kilda	117
Jason Dunstall	1988	Hawthorn	124
Jason Dunstall (2)	1989	Hawthorn	128
John Longmire	1990	North Melbourne	98
Tony Lockett (2)	1991	St Kilda	118
Jason Dunstall (3)	1992	Hawthorn	139
Gary Ablett Sr.	1993	Geelong	124
Gary Ablett Sr. (2)	1994	Geelong	113
Gary Ablett Sr. (3)	1995	Geelong	118
Tony Lockett (3)	1996	Sydney	114
Tony Modra	1997	Adelaide	81
Tony Lockett (4)	1998	Sydney	107
Scott Cummings	1999	West Coast	88
Matthew Lloyd	2000	Essendon	94
Matthew Lloyd (2)	2001	Essendon	96
David Neitz	2002	Melbourne	75
Matthew Lloyd (3)	2003	Essendon	87
Fraser Gehrig	2004	St Kilda	90
Fraser Gehrig (2)	2005	St Kilda	74
Brendan Fevola	2006	Carlton	84
Jonathan Brown	2007	Brisbane Lions	77
Lance Franklin	2008	Hawthorn	102
Brendan Fevola (2)	2009	Carlton	86
Jack Riewoldt	2010	Richmond	78
Lance Franklin (2)	2011	Hawthorn	71
Jack Riewoldt (2)	2012	Richmond	65
Jarryd Roughead	2013	Hawthorn	68
Lance Franklin (3)	2014	Sydney	67
Josh Kennedy	2015	West Coast	75
Josh Kennedy (2)	2016	West Coast	80
Lance Franklin (4)	2017	Sydney	69
Jack Riewoldt (3)	2018	Richmond	65
**Jeremy Cameron**	2019	Greater Western Sydney	67
Tom Hawkins	2020	Geelong	42
**Harry McKay**	2021	Carlton	58
**Charlie Curnow**	2022	Carlton	64
**Charlie Curnow** (2)	2023	Carlton	78
**Jesse Hogan**	2024	Greater Western Sydney	69
**Jeremy Cameron** (2)	2025	Geelong	83
**Charlie Curnow** (3)	2026	Sydney	69

=== Multiple recipients ===
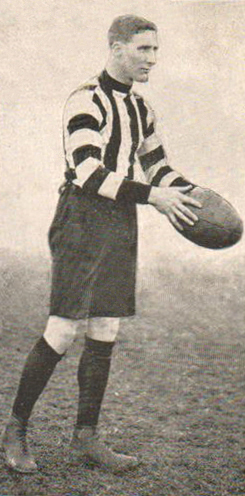
Dick Lee led the league in goalkicking a record seven times.

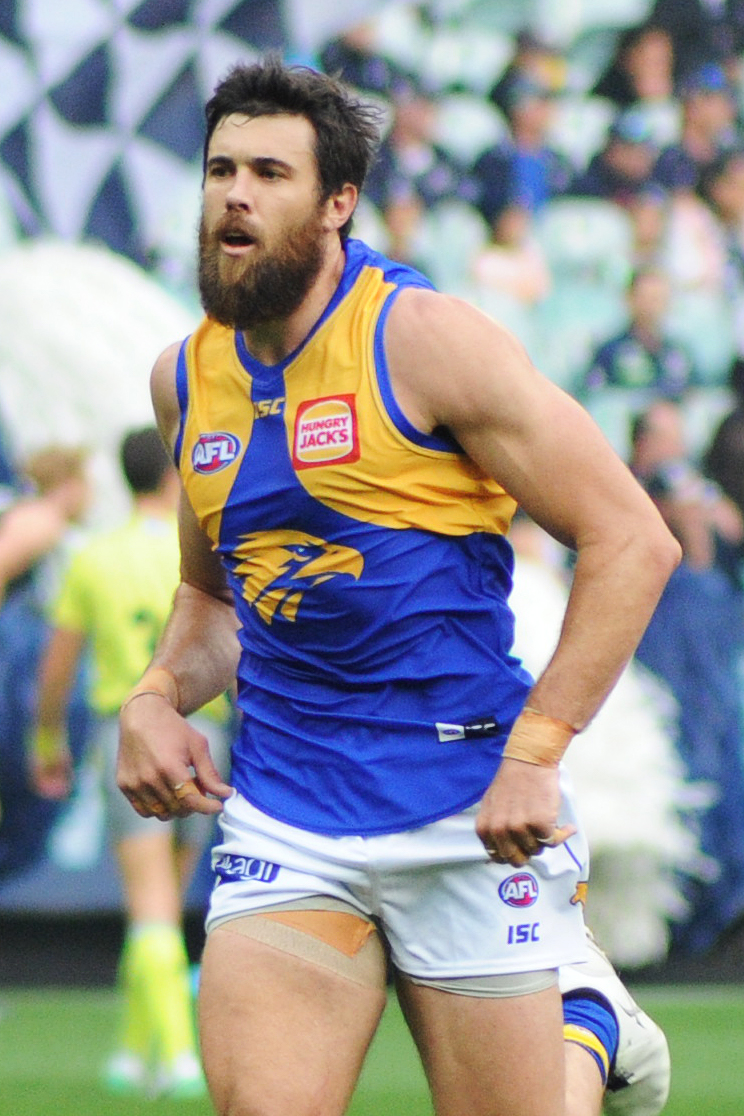
Josh Kennedy is one of 16 players to twice score the most goals in a season.

Table of multiple recipients
Player	Wins	Club(s)	Years
Dick Lee	7	Collingwood	1907, 1908, 1909, 1914, 1916, 1917, 1919
Gordon Coventry	6	Collingwood	1926, 1927, 1928, 1929, 1930, 1933
John Coleman	5	Essendon	1949, 1950, 1951, 1952, 1953
Fred Fanning	4	Melbourne	1943, 1944, 1945, 1947
Doug Wade	4	Geelong/North Melbourne	1962, 1967, 1969, 1974
Peter Hudson	4	Hawthorn	1968, 1970, 1971, 1977
Tony Lockett	4	St Kilda/Sydney	1987, 1991, 1996, 1998
Lance Franklin	4	Hawthorn/Sydney	2008, 2011, 2014, 2017
John Peck	3	Hawthorn	1963, 1964, 1965
Jason Dunstall	3	Hawthorn	1988, 1989, 1992
Gary Ablett Sr.	3	Geelong	1993, 1994, 1995
Matthew Lloyd	3	Essendon	2000, 2001, 2003
Jack Riewoldt	3	Richmond	2010, 2012, 2018
**Charlie Curnow**	3	Carlton/Sydney	2022, 2023, 2026
Eddy James	2	Geelong	1897, 1899
Teddy Lockwood	2	Geelong/Collingwood	1900, 1903
Harry Brereton	2	Melbourne	1911, 1912
Bob Pratt	2	South Melbourne	1934, 1935
Ron Todd	2	Collingwood	1938, 1939
Lindsay White	2	South Melbourne/Geelong	1942, 1948
Jack Collins	2	Footscray	1954, 1957
Ron Evans	2	Essendon	1959, 1960
Peter McKenna	2	Collingwood	1972, 1973
Kelvin Templeton	2	Footscray	1978, 1979
Michael Roach	2	Richmond	1980, 1981
Bernie Quinlan	2	Fitzroy	1983, 1984
Fraser Gehrig	2	St Kilda	2004, 2005
Brendan Fevola	2	Carlton	2006, 2009
Josh Kennedy	2	West Coast	2015, 2016
**Jeremy Cameron**	2	Greater Western Sydney/Geelong	2019, 2025

=== Club totals ===
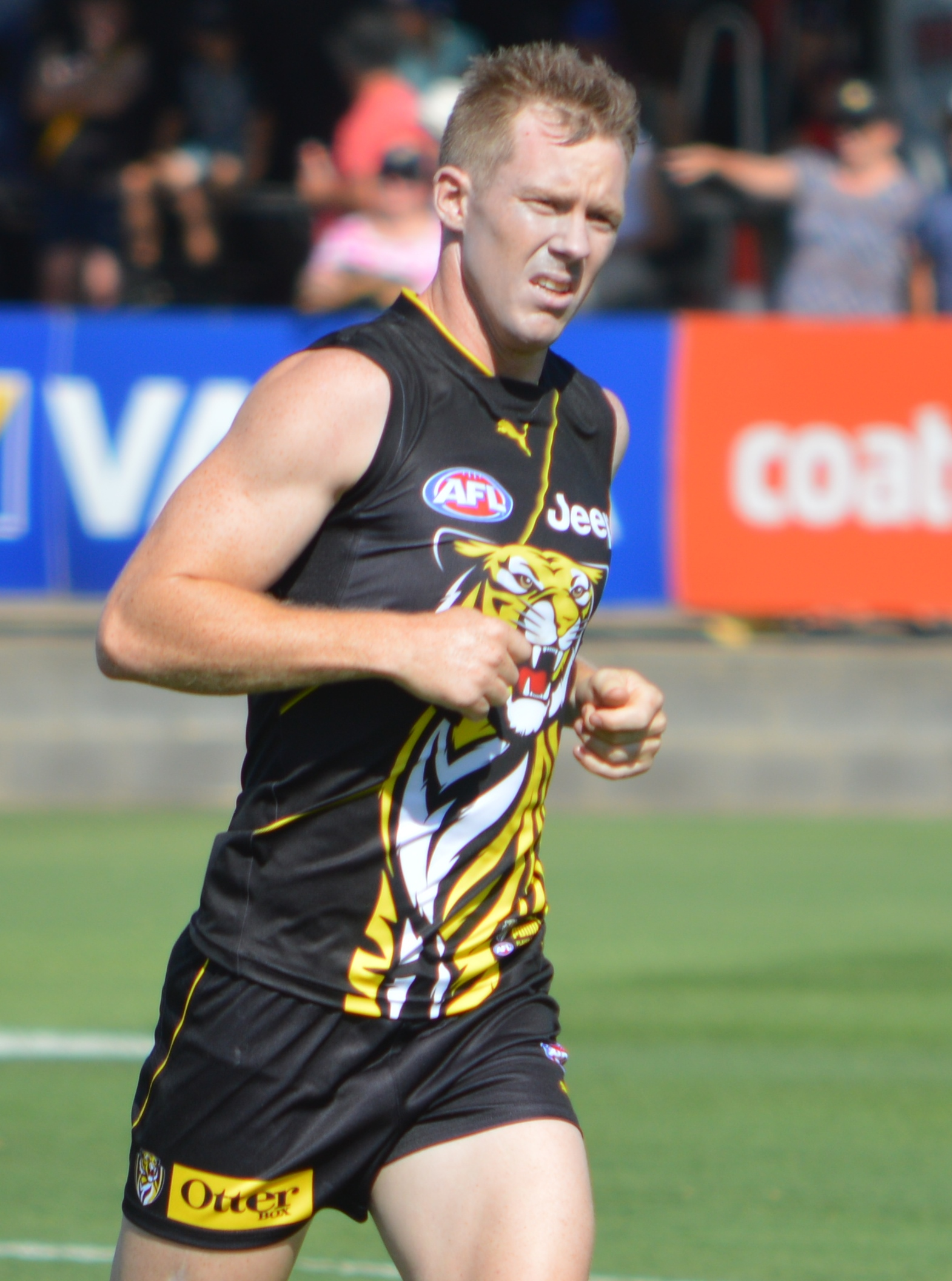
Jack Riewoldt has won three of Richmond's eight Coleman Medals / league Leading Goalkicker Awards.

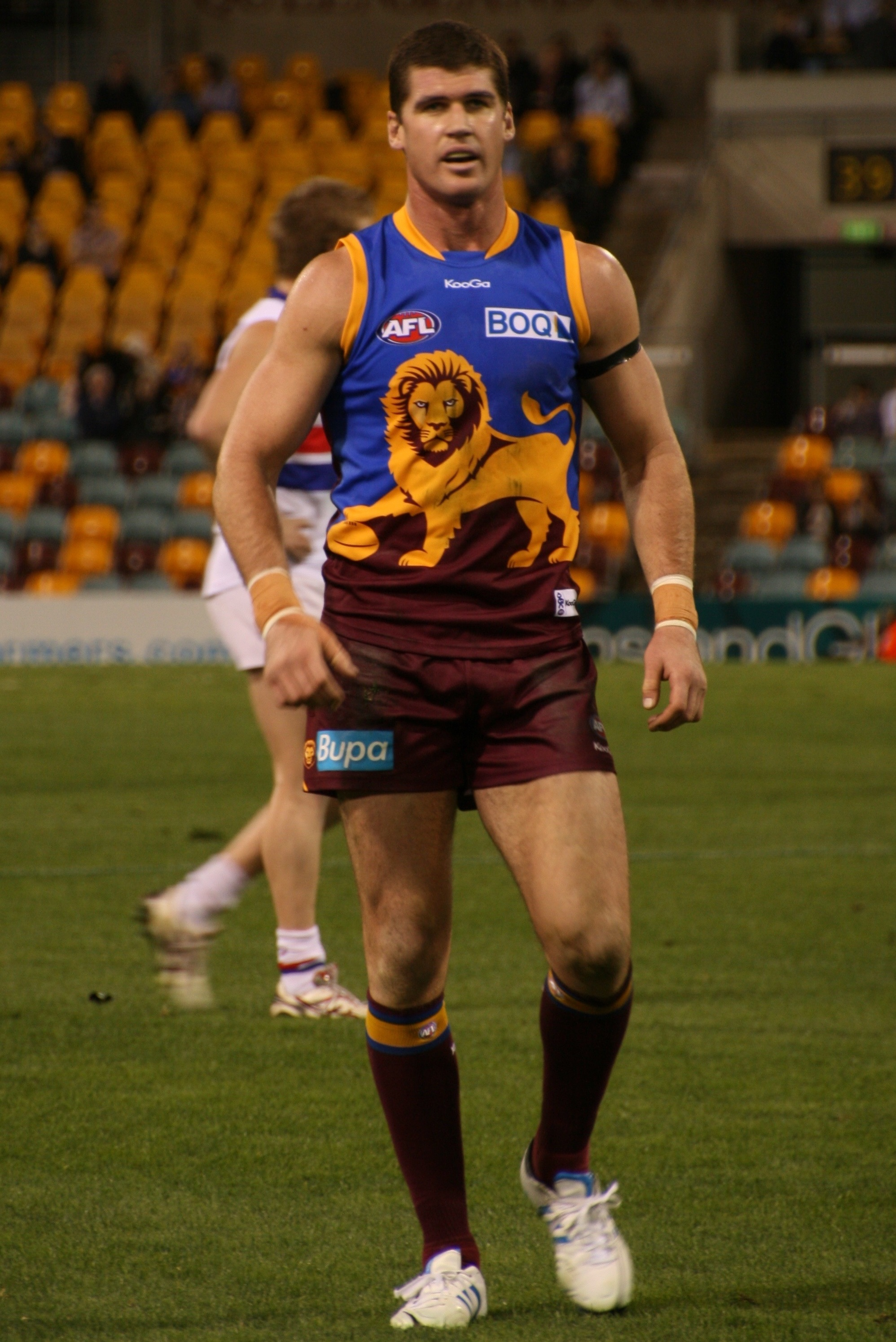
Jonathan Brown won Brisbane's only Coleman Medal in 2007, kicking 77 goals.

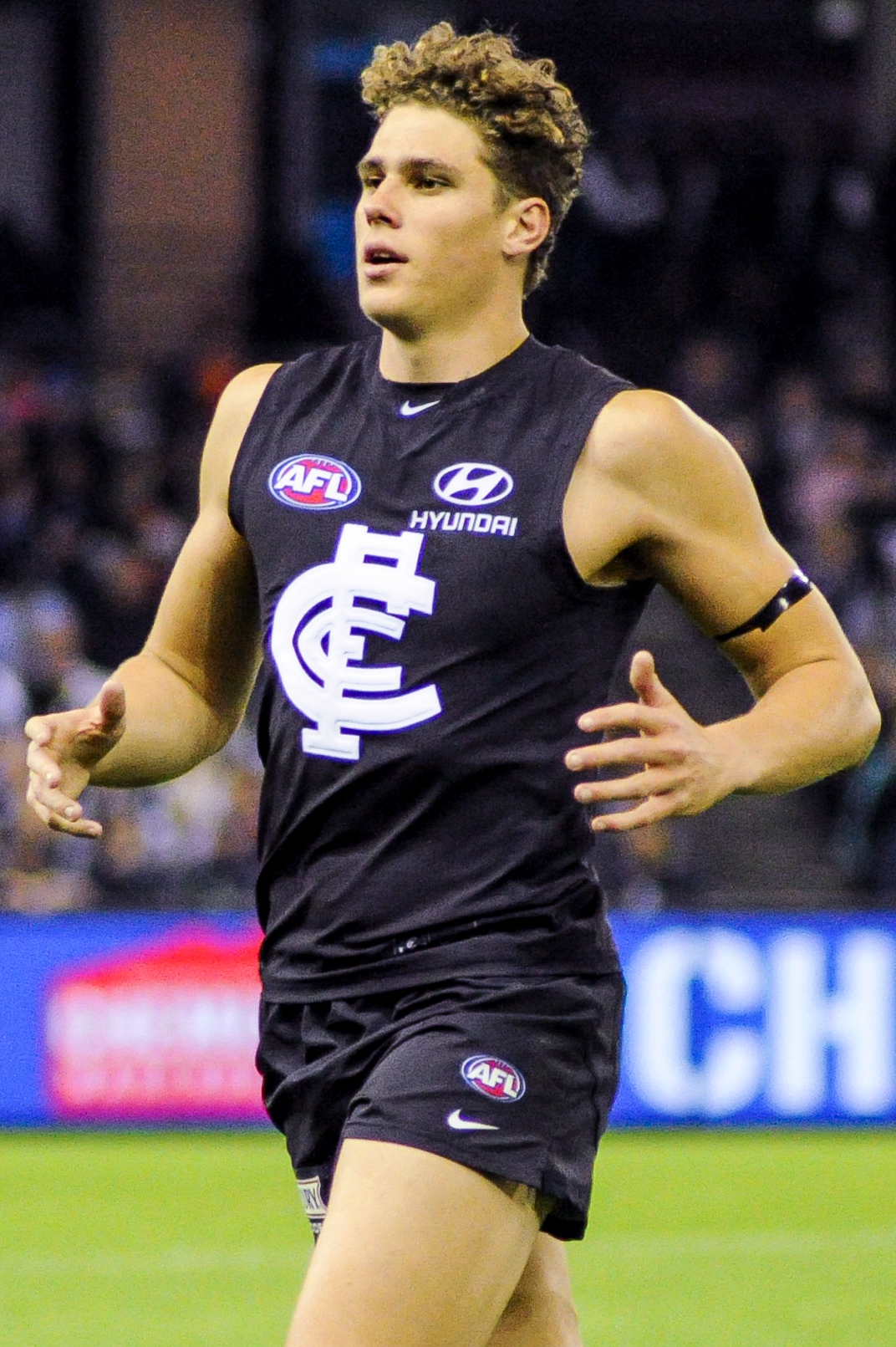
Charlie Curnow won two consecutive Coleman Medals in 2022 and 2023.

Table key
†	Club no longer participates in the AFL (Note: Three teams which have participated in the VFL/AFL no longer compete today. Fitzroy, a founding member of the league, played from 1897 to 1996 before its severe financial problems forced a merger with the Brisbane Bears, an expansion club that had competed in the VFL from 1987, to form the Brisbane Lions. University, an amateur club, played in the VFL from 1908 to 1914.)
LG	Number of Leading Goalkicker Medals (1897–1954)
C'man	Number of Coleman Medals (1955–present)

Table of club totals
Club	Medals			Years
Club	LG	C'man	Total	Years
Collingwood	19	4	23	1898, 1903, 1905, 1907, 1908, 1909, 1914, 1916, 1917, 1919, 1926, 1927, 1928, 1929, 1930, 1933, 1938, 1939, 1946, 1958, 1972, 1973, 1986
Geelong	8	10	18	1897, 1899, 1900, 1910, 1921, 1925, 1932, 1948, 1955, 1962, 1967, 1969, 1976, 1993, 1994, 1995, 2020, 2025
Essendon	8	6	14	1900, 1901, 1923, 1949, 1950, 1951, 1952, 1953, 1959, 1960, 1966, 2000, 2001, 2003
Hawthorn	0	14	14	1963, 1964, 1965, 1968, 1970, 1971, 1975, 1977, 1988, 1989, 1992, 2008, 2011, 2013
Carlton	4	6	10	1906, 1918, 1922, 1931, 1961, 2006, 2009, 2021, 2022, 2023
Melbourne	8	1	9	1897, 1904, 1911, 1912, 1943, 1944, 1945, 1947, 2002
Richmond	3	5	8	1920, 1937, 1940, 1980, 1981, 2010, 2012, 2018
Sydney (Note: Known as South Melbourne prior to 1982 relocation.)	3	5	8	1934, 1935, 1942, 1996, 1998, 2014, 2017, 2026
St Kilda	2	5	7	1902, 1936, 1956, 1987, 1991, 2004, 2005
Western Bulldogs (Note: Known as Footscray prior to 1997.)	1	4	5	1954, 1957, 1978, 1979, 1985
Fitzroy^{†}	2	2	4	1915, 1924, 1983, 1984
North Melbourne	1	3	4	1941, 1974, 1982, 1990
West Coast	—	3	3	1999, 2015, 2016
Greater Western Sydney	—	2	2	2019, 2024
Adelaide	—	1	1	1997
Brisbane Lions	—	1	1	2007
University^{†}	1	—	1	1913
Fremantle	—	0	0	—
Gold Coast	—	0	0	—
Port Adelaide	—	0	0	—
Brisbane Bears^{†}	—	—	—	—

== See also ==
- AFL Women's leading goalkicker
- Ken Farmer Medal – equivalent award in the South Australian National Football League
- Jim 'Frosty' Miller Medal – equivalent award in the Victorian Football League
- Bernie Naylor Medal – equivalent award in the West Australian Football League
