= Argus finals system =

Australian rules football playoff system

The Argus finals systems were related systems of end-of-season playoff tournaments used commonly in Australian sports competitions in the first half of the 20th century. The systems were first developed in Australian rules football competitions in 1902, and were used broadly across Australia into the 1950s.

There were several variations, but the systems were characterised by a tournament among the highest ranked teams, followed by the right of the first seed to another match to challenge for the premiership if it had not won the tournament.

After 1931, the Argus systems increasingly came into competition with the Page playoff system, which eventually replaced it as the country's pre-eminent four-team finals system.

== System ==
The most common Argus system bracket, known in full as the second amended Argus system, was played as follows:

Semi-finals
1
3
2
4

Final

Grand final (if required)
1

First, after the home and away season was completed, the top four clubs in order would qualify, with the top-ranked club designated the minor premier.

The finals were then played as follows:

- Semi-finals: minor premier vs 3rd, and 2nd vs 4th
- Final: between the winners of the two semi-finals
- Grand final (if required): minor premier vs the winner of the final

A grand final was played only if the minor premier was not also the winner of the final. This meant that the minor premier had a double-chance, and would win the premiership unless being defeated twice in the finals; a 2nd-, 3rd- or 4th-ranked team would need to win three consecutive games to win the tournament.

=== Terminology ===
The name of the second round match, shown above as final, changed with context: if it featured the 1st-ranked team, it was called the final; and if it did not feature the minor premier, it was often called the preliminary final, since it was preliminary to the grand final which would definitely follow.

In cases when the final was won by the minor premier and no grand final was required, it is common for the final to retrospectively be known as a grand final. This is a misnomer under the Argus system itself, but maintains consistency with broader modern use of the term grand final throughout Australia for any competition's decisive match. An Argus system grand final was also called a challenge match or challenge final, and this term can be used to distinguish Argus challenge grand finals from other grand finals.

The finals system's name derives from Melbourne's the Argus newspaper, which is said to have supported its use. The name does not appear to have been in wide use during the time the system was active, and may have been coined later. Contemporary names included the challenge system and grand final system.

== Variants and related systems ==
The best known variant of the Argus system, which is described above, is known in full as the second amended Argus system. There were several other variants of the Argus system, or of systems involving a right of challenge, in use over the same period.

=== First Argus system ===
Used in 1901 by the VFL, this system was a simple four-team knockout tournament, with semi-finals of 1st vs 3rd and 2nd vs 4th. The 1st-ranked team's right to challenge did not feature and was not added until 1902; and so although it has come to be referred to by the Argus system name, it otherwise lacks similarity with the other variants.

=== First amended Argus system ===
This system was similar to the second amended Argus system, except that the right to challenge went to the team with the strictly best win–loss record including the semi-finals and final/preliminary final – rather than to the minor premier in the home-and-away season. This meant the minor premier could lose the right to challenge by the end of the finals. A strictly better win–loss ratio than the winner of the final was required to have the right of challenge; having an equal record but ahead on a tie-breaker such as percentage or points differential was not sufficient.

This meant that in many seasons a final was played with no chance of a grand final following it. For example, in the 1903 VFL season, the clubs' records were such that the winner of the final would also now have the best or equal-best win–loss record after that result was included, eliminating any chance of a challenge.

=== Round-robin system with challenge ===
For the 1924 season only, the VFL trialled a new format, under which the semi-finals and final were replaced with a round-robin tournament among the top four. The 1st-ranked team from the home-and-away season would then have the right to challenge the winner of the round-robin series in the grand final, if necessary.

The series was played under the fixture:

- Week one: 1st vs 3rd; 2nd vs 4th
- Week two: 1st vs 2nd; 3rd vs 4th
- Week three: 1st vs 4th; 2nd vs 3rd
- Grand final: 1st vs round-robin winner (if necessary)

In the sole VFL season that the system was used, no grand final was required.

This scheme was developed as a result of demand for entry to finals matches in the early 1920s exceeding the capacity of the Melbourne Cricket Ground. It was thought that, by playing two games per weekend during the finals instead of one, more overall spectators would be able to attend the finals; and although this did occur, it did not translate to higher receipts, and the scheme was abandoned after one year.

=== Three-team system with challenge ===
Some smaller leagues, such as the four-team Tasmanian Australian National Football League, utilised a three-team finals system including the Argus-style right of challenge. Such a system typically bracketed as follows:

Semi-final
2
3

Final
1

Grand final (if required)
1

Which team was afforded the right of challenge depended on the league. In particular, where the system was used in Tasmania it was typically the team with strictly the best home-and-away win–loss record, not the team with most premiership points, who had right of challenge (not all home-and-away matches were played for the same number of premiership points in Tasmania at the time).

=== Other variations ===
There were several other variants of finals systems which included a minor premier's right of challenge. Some of note include:

- Victorian Amateur Football Association: Beginning in 1929, the VAFA used an Argus system with semi-final pairings of 1st vs 4th and 2nd vs 3rd. Under the system, the minor premier needed strictly the best win–loss record in the home and away season to have the right of challenge.
- Barrier Ranges Football Association: in the 1930s, the Broken Hill league used a version of the three-team challenge system. The difference occurred only if the third-placed team won the final; in this case, the second- and third-placed teams would play each other again, and the winner of that match would be the one to face the minor premiers in the challenge match.

== History ==
The challenge Argus systems were developed in 1902, at the end of a period of experimentation by the Victorian Football League and South Australian Football Association in finals systems. The leagues had sought to maintain greater public interest at the end of the season by ensuring the premiership could not be decided until the final match was played, while also ensuring that the season's best performing team was afforded the greatest opportunity to finish as premier. By comparison, most competitions at the time awarded the premiership to the team with the best win–loss record across the season, with the provision for a single playoff match only if teams were tied for first place.

Both leagues had experimented with different systems until 1901, chiefly based on the 1898 VFL finals system which gave all clubs the chance to contest the finals, but included the minor premier's right to challenge: the VFL abandoned this system after 1900, when Melbourne won the premiership after finishing the home-and-away season in sixth out of eight with a record of 6–8, which was widely considered a farcical outcome. The VFL adopted the simple knock-out first Argus system in 1901, but after minor premier Geelong was eliminated following its loss in the semi-final, it was still felt that the system had not struck the right balance.

In 1902, the VFL and SAFA each implemented a variation of the Argus system: the VFL introduced the first amended Argus system and the SAFA introduced the second amended Argus system. Both systems became popular, as it was now felt they balanced the public excitement of finals with a fair advantage for the best team.

The SAFA's second amended system ultimately replaced the VFL's first amended system as the preferred version by the end of the decade, and the second amended system came to be widely used in Australian sport, from top level competitions down to suburban and country leagues.

However, over time, two major drawbacks emerged with the system:

- Chiefly, there was a clear financial benefit to the league for a grand final to be played, as the extra match would bring additional gate takings. The benefit was not seen directly by the competing clubs, since the cost of playing in a final was greater than the expenses allowed to be claimed by the league, but rather indirectly via the higher dividend to all clubs, since finals gate takings were shared evenly.
- Secondly, the minor premier was seen to have an easier path to the premiership by losing its semi-final, rather than by winning its semi-final and losing the final, since the semi-final loss allowed for a week off while a final loss did not.

Both of these possible motivations for the minor premier to throw an early final led, rightly or wrongly, to a negative public perception of whether or not these contests were genuine.

To correct for these drawbacks, the VFL, SANFL and WAFL all replaced the Argus system with the Page playoff system (also known as the Page-McIntyre system) in 1931. The new system also fixed the number of finals at four (excluding any replays necessitated by drawn matches), and removed the minor premier's right to challenge, instead giving the minor premier and the second-placed team the advantage of a non-elimination semi-final.

The Argus and Page systems existed in competition with each other for another three decades, with many competitions retaining the Argus system or even reverting to it after unsuccessful changes to the Page system. However, the Argus system was mostly extinct by the 1950s, as the New South Wales Rugby League switched to the Page system in 1954, and amateur Australian rules football switched in 1957.

=== Major competitions to use the Argus systems ===
Among the top competitions to use the systems were:

- Victorian Football League: First (1901); First amended (1902–1906); Second amended (1907–1930, excl. 1924); round-robin (1924)
- Victorian Football Association: Second amended (1903–1932)
- South Australian National Football League: Second amended (1902–1930)
- West Australian Football League: First amended (1904–1910); Second amended (1911–1930)
- Tasmanian Australian National Football League: Three-team systems (1929–1946)
- New South Wales Rugby League (1926–1954)
- Brisbane Rugby League (1922–1933)

== See also ==
- AFL finals series
- Grand final
- Page playoff system
