= Teddy Lockwood =

Australian rules footballer (1872–1953)

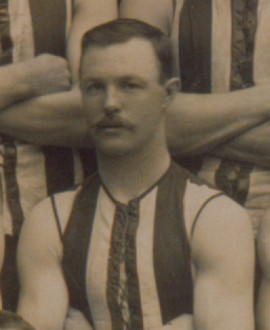
- Lockwood in 1902

Personal information
- Full name: Edward Lockwood
- Born: 6 December 1872; Geelong
- Died: 25 June 1953 (aged 80); South Melbourne Cricket Ground
- Original team: West Perth

Playing career^{1}
| Years | Club | Games (Goals) |
| 1899–1901 | Geelong | 45 (61) |
| 1902–1905 | Collingwood | 53 (83) |
| Total | | 98 (144) |
- ^{1} Playing statistics correct to the end of 1905.

Career highlights
- 2× VFL premiership player: 1902, 1903; 2× VFL Leading Goalkicker: 1900, 1903; Geelong leading goalkicker: 1900; Collingwood leading goalkicker: 1903

Edward Lockwood (6 December 1872 – 25 June 1953) was an Australian rules footballer who played for Geelong and Collingwood during the years following the formation of the Victorian Football League (VFL). He was originally from the Geelong area, but came to the VFL from West Perth.

== Family ==
The sons of Thomas Lockwood (1821-1876), and Charlotte Lockwood (1843-1884), née Chambers (later Mrs. William Moorhouse Hardman), Teddy Lockwood and his twin brother George Lockwood were born at Geelong on 6 December 1872.

== Football ==
Lockwood played mostly as a forward and spent his first three seasons in the VFL with Geelong, topping their goal kicking in 1900. He joined Collingwood in 1902 and was a member of the club's premiership side that year with three goals in their Grand Final win over Essendon. The following year he kicked a career best 35 goals and was both Collingwood's and the VFL's leading goal kicker, the latter earning him the Leading Goalkicker Medal. To cap off the season Lockwood played in another premiership side. In 1917, Lockwood officiated in a VFL game as a goal umpire.

After his football career, Lockwood served as groundsman at the South Melbourne Cricket Ground until his death in 1953.
