= Arthur Rayson =

Australian rules footballer (1901–1970)

Personal information
- Full name: Arthur William Rayson
- Born: 1 December 1901; Dunolly, Victoria
- Died: 21 January 1970 (aged 68); Geelong West, Victoria
- Original team: Cobden (HFL)
- Height: 170 cm (5 ft 7 in)
- Weight: 71 kg (157 lb)

Playing career^{1}
Years	Club	Games (Goals)
1924–1931	Geelong	101 (128)
- ^{1} Playing statistics correct to the end of 1931.

Arthur William Rayson (1 December 1901 – 21 January 1970) was an Australian rules footballer who played for Geelong in the VFL.

== Family ==
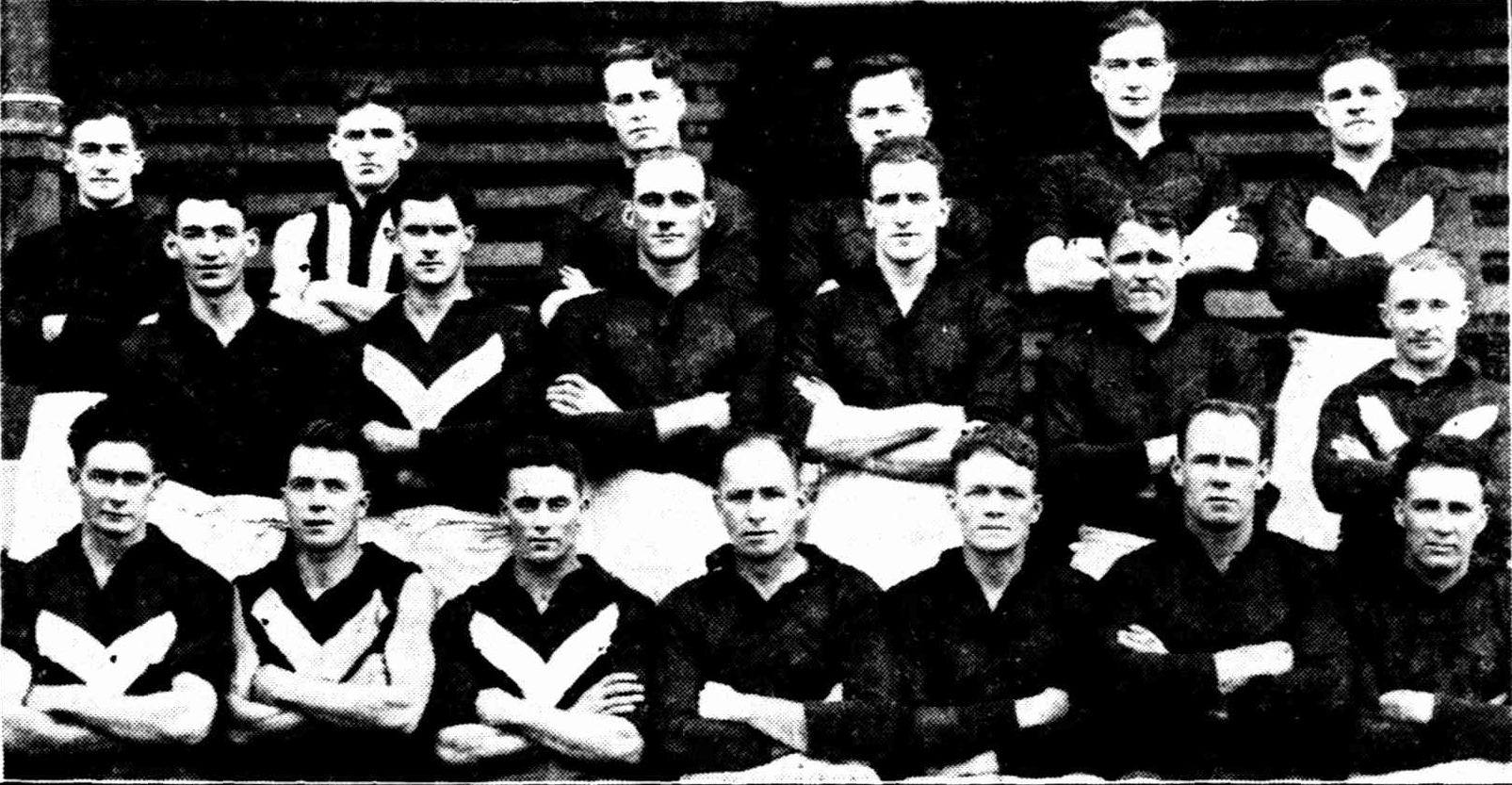
The Victorian Football League's Interstate team that drew with South Australia, in Adelaide, 13.10 (88) to 11.22 (88) on Saturday, 16 June 1928. Back Row: Jack Moriarty, Albert "Leeter" Collier, Hugh Dunbar, Gordon "Nuts" Coventry, Bob Johnson, Jack Baggott. Second Row: Jack Vosti, Charlie Stanbridge, Arthur Stevens, Alex Duncan, Dick Taylor, Ted Baker. Front Row: Basil McCormack, Arthur Rayson, Allan Geddes (vice-captain), Syd Coventry (captain), Barney Carr, Arthur "Bull" Coghlan, Herbert White.

The son of George Rayson (1873-1960), and Minnie Rayson (1876-1939), née Dawson, Arthur William Rayson was born at Dunolly, Victoria on 1 December 1898.

He married May Perrett (1900-1984) in 1922. They had three children: a daughter, Dorothy, and two sons, Alan Arthur Rayson (1924–1982), and Coleman Medalist Noel Douglas Rayson (1933–2003), both of whom played for Geelong.

== Football ==
Recruited to Geelong from the Cobden Football Club, Rayson was a rover who liked to use the stab kick. He played at half-forward flank in Geelong's 1925 premiership team.

=== Geelong (Seconds) ===
He kicked 4 goals, and was one of Geelong's best players in the team that won the VFL's 1923 "Junior League" premiership, against Richmond, 9.12 (66) to 5.10 (40), despite having to play the entire second half with only 17 men.

=== Geelong (Firsts) ===
==== 7 August 1926 ====
7 August 1926, Corio Oval

Geelong hit the lead in the third quarter, a signal for
St Kilda to apply greater force. Down went Chambers of
Geelong, a boundary umpire histrionically threatening to
report a St Kilda player. Next, Rayson, a brilliant Geelong
player and also the Geelong caretaker, fell to the ground
and with broken ribs. He was carried dramatically to his
house within the grounds.
It was the signal for all hell to break loose. When the
bell rang, the Saints sensed big trouble and tried to leave
the ground hurriedly; Shelton and Stan Hepburn were
engulfed on the field by swarming, shouting barrackers.
The Geelong supporters had become an unruly, vengeful
mob.
Shelton was hit by an umbrella wielded with wounding
purpose and suffered a torrent of abuse and blows.
Another Geelong fan wrenched a picket from the fence
and advanced on Shelton. Shelton smartly dodged the
blow, grabbed the picket and held it to defend himself.
A mounted policeman rode up, tore the picket from
Shelton's hands and with arrogant urgency hustled
Shelton and Hepburn up the race and into the rooms.
(Main and Allen, 2002, p.336)

Main and Allen, (2002, p. 336) have, along with Feldman and Holmesby (1992), become confused between John Thomas "Jack" Shelton and the other St Kilda Shelton (John Frederick "Jack" Shelton). John Thomas "Jack" Shelton was not in the St Kilda team that played against Geelong at the Corio Oval on 7 August 1926, but John Frederick "Jack" Shelton did play for St Kilda on that day. Therefore, the "Shelton" mentioned in the account of the thuggery directed, particularly, at Rayson (who also worked as the caretaker at the Corio Oval), by members of the St Kilda team, and the account of the spectators' response to Rayson's injury (which included broken ribs), specifically directed at Shelton, refers exclusively to John Frederick "Jack" Shelton, and not John Thomas "Jack" Shelton (as Feldman and Holmesby, and Main and Allen have mistakenly supposed).

== Death ==
He died at Geelong West, Victoria on 21 January 1970.
