= Dick Taylor (Australian rules footballer) =

Australian rules footballer (1900–1962)

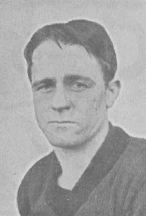

Personal information
- Full name: Richard John Taylor
- Born: 28 November 1900; Armadale, Victoria
- Died: 25 May 1962 (aged 61); Heidelberg, Victoria
- Original team: South Yarra
- Height: 5 ft 10 in (178 cm)
- Weight: 11 st 0 lb (70 kg)

Playing career^{1}
Years	Club	Games (Goals)
1922–1931	Melbourne	161 (98)
1932–1934	North Melbourne	40 (25)
1935	Melbourne	3 (2)
Total		204 (125)

Coaching career
Years	Club	Games (W–L–D)
1932–1934	North Melbourne	42 (14–27–1)
- ^{1} Playing statistics correct to the end of 1935.

Career highlights
- Melbourne premiership player 1926

Richard John Taylor (28 November 1900 – 25 May 1962) was an Australian rules footballer who played for Melbourne and North Melbourne in the Victorian Football League (VFL).

== Family ==
The son of Richard Taylor (1865–1939), and Charlotte Taylor (1868–1923), née Walker, Richard John Taylor was born at Armadale, Victoria on 28 November 1900.

== Football ==
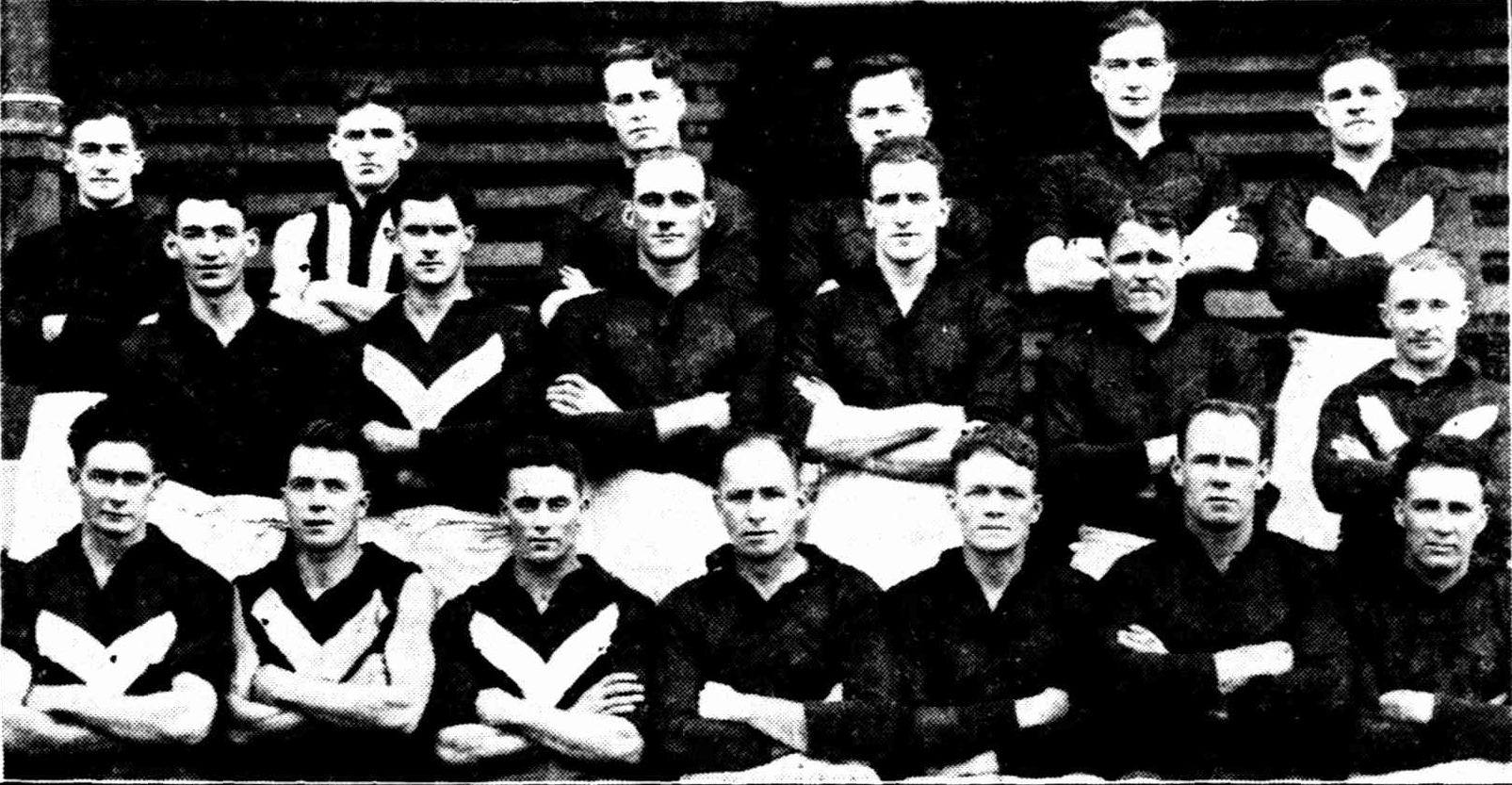
The Victorian Football League’s Interstate team that drew with South Australia, in Adelaide, 13.10 (88) to 11.22 (88) on Saturday, 16 June 1928. Back Row: Jack Moriarty, Albert "Leeter" Collier, Hugh Dunbar, Gordon "Nuts" Coventry, Bob Johnson, Jack Baggott. Second Row: Jack Vosti, Charlie Stanbridge, Arthur Stevens, Alex Duncan, Dick Taylor, Ted Baker. Front Row: Basil McCormack, Arthur Rayson, Allan Geddes (vice-captain), Syd Coventry (captain), Barney Carr, Arthur “Bull” Coghlan, Herbert White.

=== Melbourne (VFL) ===
Taylor played as a centreman. He made his VFL debut with Melbourne in the last home-and-away match of the 1922 season, against Fitzroy, at Princes Park, (Note: The game was shifted to Princes Park because the MCG was unavailable due to a special school children's display.) on 16 September 1922.

He went on to play 164 games for Melbourne, including 127 consecutive games from his debut until an injury sustained from a kick on the leg in the violent and spiteful 17 August 1929 match against Footscray, in which Taylor had kicked 6 goals, meant that he was unable to pass a fitness test on the morning of the next match — and, therefore, could not play in the 24 August 1929 match against St Kilda. He was a last-minute inclusion in that season's final match against Collingwood, at the MCG, on 31 August 1929.

He was a member of Melbourne's 1926 premiership side; and, during his time at Melbourne, he represented Victoria at interstate football on 15 occasions.

==== 1927 Brownlow Medal ====
In 1927 he finished equal second, with Carlton's Alex Duncan, behind Collingwood's Syd Coventry in the Brownlow Medal count.

=== North Melbourne (VFL) ===
After playing with Melbourne for ten seasons, he was cleared to North Melbourne in 1932 and was appointed captain-coach.

He got suspended after a fiery game in 1932, and was barred from coaching for four matches. Charlie Cameron filled the role in his absence.

==== Saturday, 14 July 1934 ====
Midway through July 1934, North Melbourne were on the bottom of the VFL Ladder, having not won any of its nine matches to that stage. Hawthorn, with only one win, and eight losses, were second from bottom.

Immediately after the 14 July game against Hawthorn at Glenferrie Oval — a strongly wind-affected game, which Hawthorn won, 6.17 (53) to North Melbourne's 6.12 (48) — he resigned as a player, in disgust at the attitude and performance of the North Melbourne players. When asked about the team's performance, following the match he said, "Once again we can attribute our defeat to our forwards. Some of our men are either playing badly or they don't want to play well. I am disgusted with our showing, and am definite that I have played my last game with North."

Disgusted with Team: Dick Taylor: Club's Worry
"Definitely, I shall not play with North again", said the captain-coach of North Melbourne League Football Club (Dick Taylor) today. I am telephoning my resignation as a player to Jack Adams (club secretary) now.
"I am disgusted with the team", he said, "and after North's showing against Hawthorn on Saturday I feel that there is nothing else for me to do but resign.
"I expect my resignation will come up before the club meeting on Thursday.
"If North will have me as a non-playing coach I will carry on: but I am determined I shall not play again."
His 200th Game
It was Taylor's 200th League game, and he played his typically heady and serviceable game. He received numerous congratulations on having reached his double century, but he was very disgusted when interviewed in the dressing room immediately afterwards.
"What is the use of battling your heart out for a team like that!" he said. "I don't mind a man playing badly when it is because he just cannot hit form—the best of players are always liable to do that.
"I think that the reason why certain of our players did not show up well today was—well, the reason was not that they could not do better! There is not the right team spirit at North; but to say what I think at this stage will not help the team along." — The Herald, Monday, 16 July 1934.

Given the club's expressed policy of employing only a playing coach, the North Melbourne committee "considered" his request to continue as the team's non-playing coach at its meeting on the Monday evening, and "decided to accept Taylor's resignation with regret", and appointed full-forward, Tom Fitzmaurice, as captain-coach for the remainder of the 1934 season.

In relation to Taylor's resignation, it is significant that Fitzmaurice, who was re-appointed as North Melbourne's captain-coach for the 1935 season, resigned immediately following the club's 28th consecutive loss — since its last win against St Kilda on 12 August 1933 — in the match (against Collingwood, 16.30 (126) to 6.10 (46), on 15 June 1935, as both player and coach, for exactly the same reasons that Taylor had resigned 12 months earlier. (Note: Fitzmaurice's resignation was accepted; he was cleared to Brunswick in the VFA, and was replaced (as non-playing coach) by former South Melbourne coach Paddy Scanlan.)

=== Melbourne (VFL) ===
Cleared back to Melbourne in 1935, he spent most of the season playing with the Second XVIII; however, he played another three senior games before retiring at the end of the season.

== Melbourne Football Club ==
He served the Melbourne Football Club as its Chairman of Selectors (1947–1950), as its VFL delegate (1953–1962), and as a Director (1936, 1937, 1939–1942, and 1945–1962).

== Death ==
He died at Heidelberg, Victoria on 25 May 1962.

== See also ==
- 1924 Hobart Carnival
- 1927 Melbourne Carnival
