= Allan Geddes =

Australian rules footballer (1903–1987)

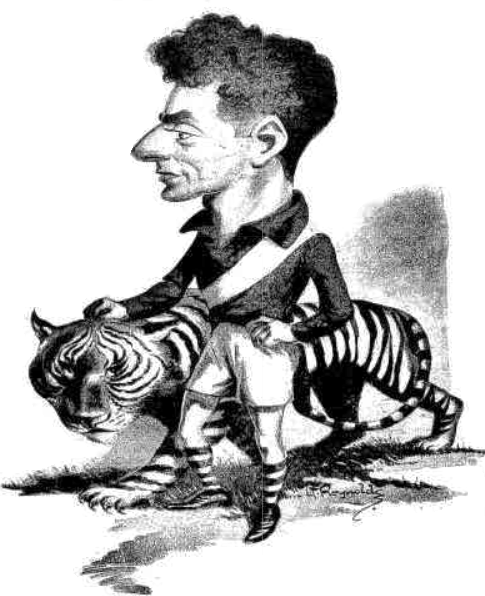
- 1927 caricature by Reynolds (Note: Misspelled "Alan" in the Table Talk article and elsewhere)

Personal information
- Full name: Allan Edward Geddes
- Born: 4 November 1903; North Melbourne, Victoria
- Died: 12 December 1987 (aged 84); Kew, Victoria
- Original team: Williamstown (VFA)
- Height: 173 cm (5 ft 8 in)
- Weight: 74 kg (163 lb)

Playing career^{1}
Years	Club	Games (Goals)
1925–1935	Richmond	182 (14)
- ^{1} Playing statistics correct to the end of 1935.

Career highlights
- Richmond Premiership Player 1932, 1934; Richmond Captain 1927-1928; 1930; Interstate Games:- 9; Richmond - Hall of Fame - inducted 2007

Allan Edward Geddes (4 November 1903 – 12 December 1987) was an Australian rules football player who played between 1922 and 1924 in the VFA for the Williamstown Football Club, and in the VFL between 1925 and 1935 for the Richmond Football Club.

== VFA ==
He played with the VFA club Williamstown from 1922 to 1924, playing 51 games and scoring seven goals.

He also played one game for a combined VFA team that played against a Perth Football Club team, at the North Melbourne Cricket Ground on 2 August 1924; In a low scoring match, played in appalling conditions, the Perth team won by two points: 3.8 (26) to 3.6 (24). Geddes was one of Victoria's best players.

== VFL (Firsts) ==
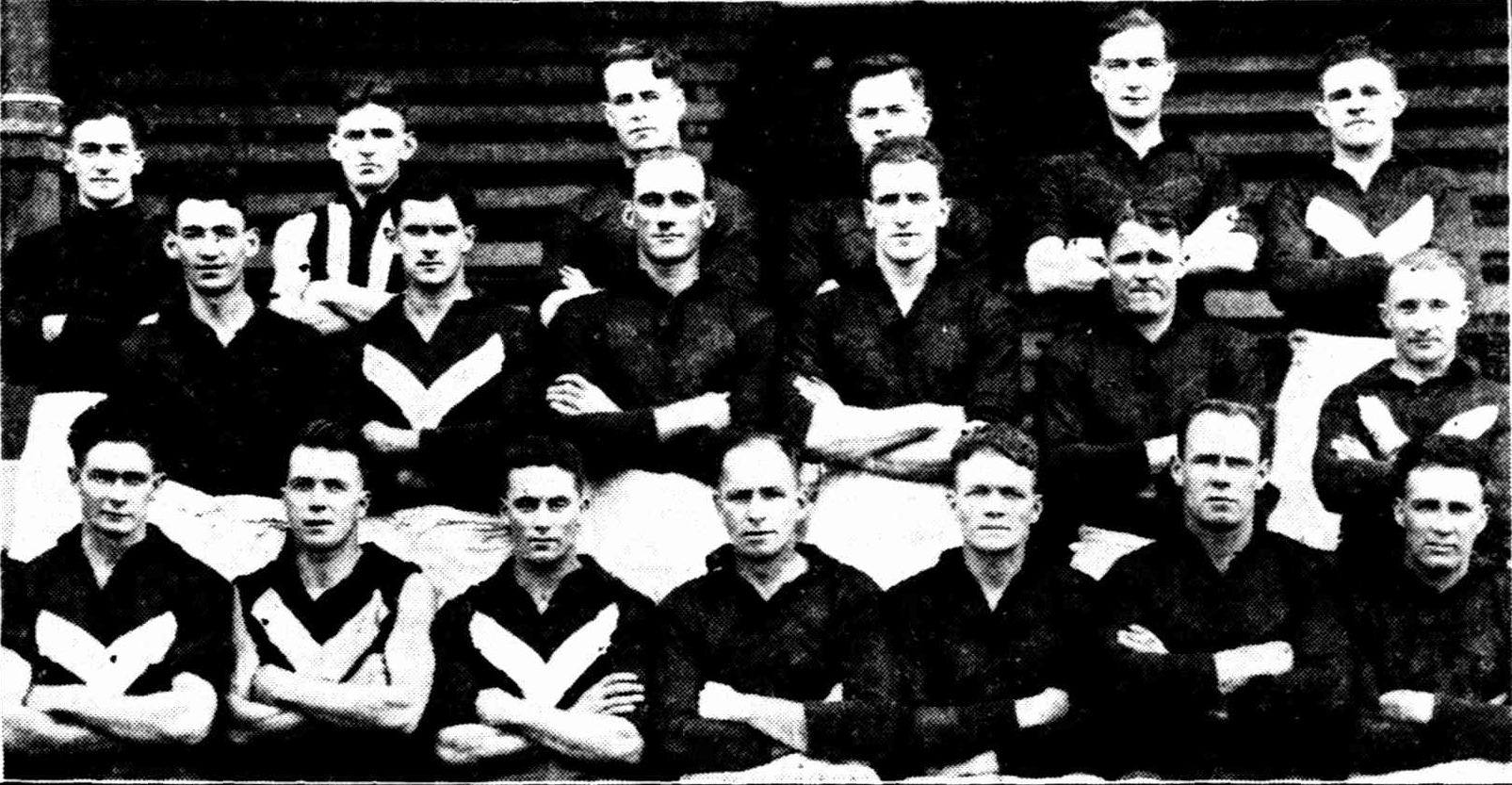
The Victorian Football League's Interstate team that drew with South Australia, in Adelaide, 13.10 (88) to 11.22 (88) on Saturday, 16 June 1928. Back Row: Jack Moriarty, Albert Collier, Hugh Dunbar, Gordon Coventry, Bob Johnson, Jack Baggott. Second Row: Jack Vosti, Charlie Stanbridge, Arthur Stevens, Alex Duncan, Dick Taylor, Ted Baker. Front Row: Basil McCormack, Arthur Rayson, Allan Geddes (vice-captain), Syd Coventry (captain), Barney Carr, Arthur Coghlan, Herbert White.

He was cleared from Williamstown to Richmond on 1 May 1925, and played on the wing in his first match for Richmond in round one of the 1925 season, against the Hawthorn Football Club, at Glenferrie Oval on 2 May 1925 (the Hawthorn Club's first ever VFL match). Geddes played well in a team that beat Hawthorn 11.11 (77) to (5.9 (39).

=== Brownlow Medal ===
He was equal second, along with Geelong's Carji Greeves and Melbourne's Bob Johnson, to Ivor Warne-Smith in the 1926 Brownlow Medal.

== VFL (Seconds) ==
=== Richmond ===
He played 45 games with the Richmond Second XVIII between 1936 and 1938. He was the team's captain/coach in 1936 and 1937, and was the team's coach in 1938 (although still playing, and still the team's coach, he was no longer its captain).

=== Carlton ===
He was the non-playing Coach of the Carlton Seconds in 1939.

== After football ==
He was appointed as a selector for Richmond in 1940.

== See also ==
- 1927 Melbourne Carnival

== Sources ==
- Hogan P: The Tigers Of Old, Richmond FC, Melbourne 1996
