= Ted Baker (footballer) =

Australian rules footballer, born 1901

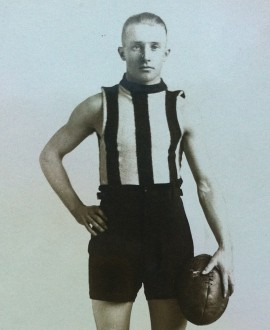
- baker during his Collingwood career

Personal information
- Full name: Edward Richard Baker
- Born: 21 January 1901; Maryborough, Victoria
- Died: 22 July 1986 (aged 85); Oakleigh South, Victoria
- Height: 165 cm (5 ft 5 in)
- Weight: 68 kg (150 lb)

Playing career^{1}
Years	Club	Games (Goals)
1920	Carlton	1 (0)
1922–1923	Collingwood	33 (24)
1927–1932	Geelong	95 (101)
1932	Collingwood	10 (9)
1934	Footscray	3 (5)
Total		142 (139)

Representative team honours
Years	Team	Games (Goals)
	Victoria	8
- ^{1} Playing statistics correct to the end of 1934.

Career highlights
- VFL premiership player: 1931; Geelong captain 1931

Edward Richard Baker (21 January 1901 – 22 July 1986) was an Australian rules footballer who played with four clubs in the Victorian Football League (VFL), mainly for Geelong and Collingwood.

Baker was born in Maryborough, but lived in Wonthaggo from the age of ten years old.

A rover, he also played eight games for Victoria at interstate football.

The highlight of his career was being Geelong's 1931 VFL premiership captain.

== See also ==
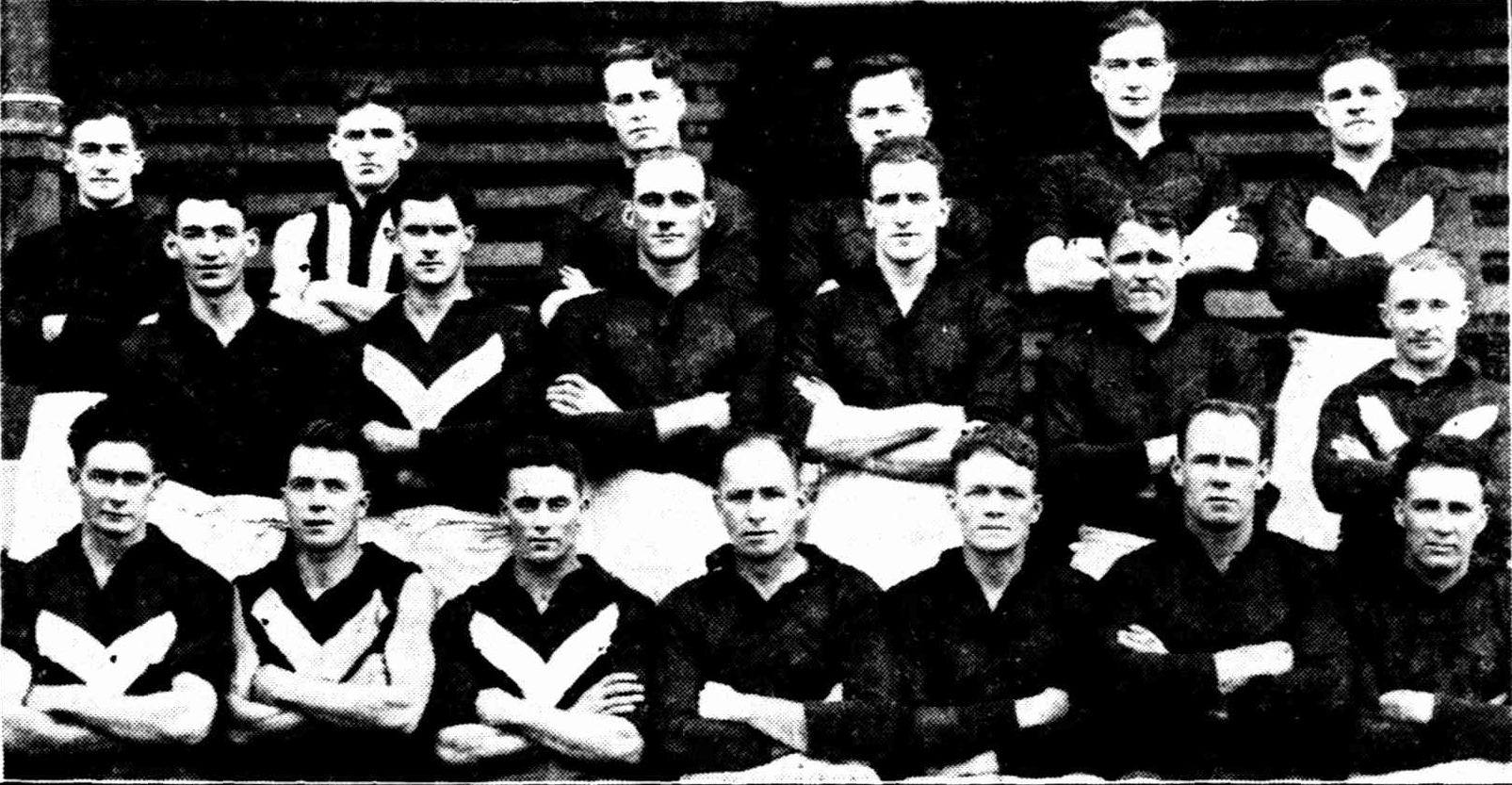
The Victorian Football League's Interstate team that drew with South Australia, in Adelaide, 13.10 (88) to 11.22 (88) on Saturday, 16 June 1928. Back Row: Jack Moriarty, Albert "Leeter" Collier, Hugh Dunbar, Gordon "Nuts" Coventry, Bob Johnson, Jack Baggott. Second Row: Jack Vosti, Charlie Stanbridge, Arthur Stevens, Alex Duncan, Dick Taylor, Ted Baker. Front Row: Basil McCormack, Arthur Rayson, Allan Geddes (vice-captain), Syd Coventry (captain), Barney Carr, Arthur “Bull” Coghlan, Herbert White.

- 1927 Melbourne Carnival
