= Jack Baggott =

Australian rules footballer, born 1906

Personal information
- Full name: John Henry Baggott
- Born: 20 July 1906; Pietermaritzburg, Colony of Natal
- Died: 2 June 1995 (aged 88)
- Original teams: Northcote, Dimboola
- Height: 182 cm (6 ft 0 in)
- Weight: 75.5 kg (166 lb)

Playing career^{1}
| Years | Club | Games (Goals) |
| 1925 | Northcote | 13 (21) |
| 1926 | Dimboola | ? (?) |
| 1927–1935 | Richmond | 128 (140) |
| 1936–1937 | Essendon | 19 (0) |
| Total | | 160 (161) |

Coaching career
| Years | Club | Games (W–L–D) |
| 1936–1939 | Essendon | 60 (22–38–0) |
| 1940 | South Melbourne | 18 (7–11–0) |
| Total | | 78 (29–49–0) |
- ^{1} Playing statistics correct to the end of 1937.

Career highlights
- VFL premiership player: 1932, 1934; Richmond leading goalkicker: 1927, 1928; Interstate games: 4; Essendon captain-coach: 1936–1937; Richmond Life Member: 1960; Richmond Hall of Fame: 2019

John Henry Baggott (20 July 1906 – 2 June 1995) was an Australian rules footballer who played and coached in the Victorian Football League (VFL) between 1927 and 1940 for the Richmond Football Club, Essendon Football Club, and South Melbourne Football Club.

== Career in football ==
Baggott represented the Richmond Football Club between 1927 and 1935. He was Richmond's leading goal kicker in his debut year of 1927 with 37 goals, and again in 1928 with 61 goals. In Round 9 of the 1928 season he kicked a then club record 12 goals against South Melbourne, the first Richmond player to ever hit double figures in goal-kicking in a game. He placed third in the League's best and fairest award, the Brownlow Medal in that same year, and was also named in the Victorian state representative team in both 1928 and 1929. Baggot represented the club in several Grand Finals, including the 1932 and 1934 Premiership teams. By that stage Baggott was playing as an attacking half-back flanker, and was named in Richmond's best in both these Grand Final victories. He was a late withdrawal from the club's 1927 grand final team, suffering a side injury at training in the lead-up, after having played every game for the season.

At the end of 1935 Baggott left Richmond to take on the role of captain-coach of the rival Essendon Football Club, starting in the 1936 season. He wound up his playing career during the 1937 season, at which point he handed over the captaincy to Keith Forbes, but continued coaching Essendon for several more seasons. An ongoing lack of success saw him replaced by legendary Essendon player and coach Dick Reynolds six games into the 1939 season. Baggott was then appointed as senior coach of the South Melbourne Football Club in 1940, but again achieved little success in with the Swans and was replaced at the end of that season.

Baggott later returned to Richmond and played a key role in forming the club's 'Former Players and Officials’ Association'. In 1960 he was made a life member of the Richmond Football Club. In 2019 Baggott was posthumously inducted into the Richmond 'Hall of Fame', with the award being accepted on his behalf by his nephew.

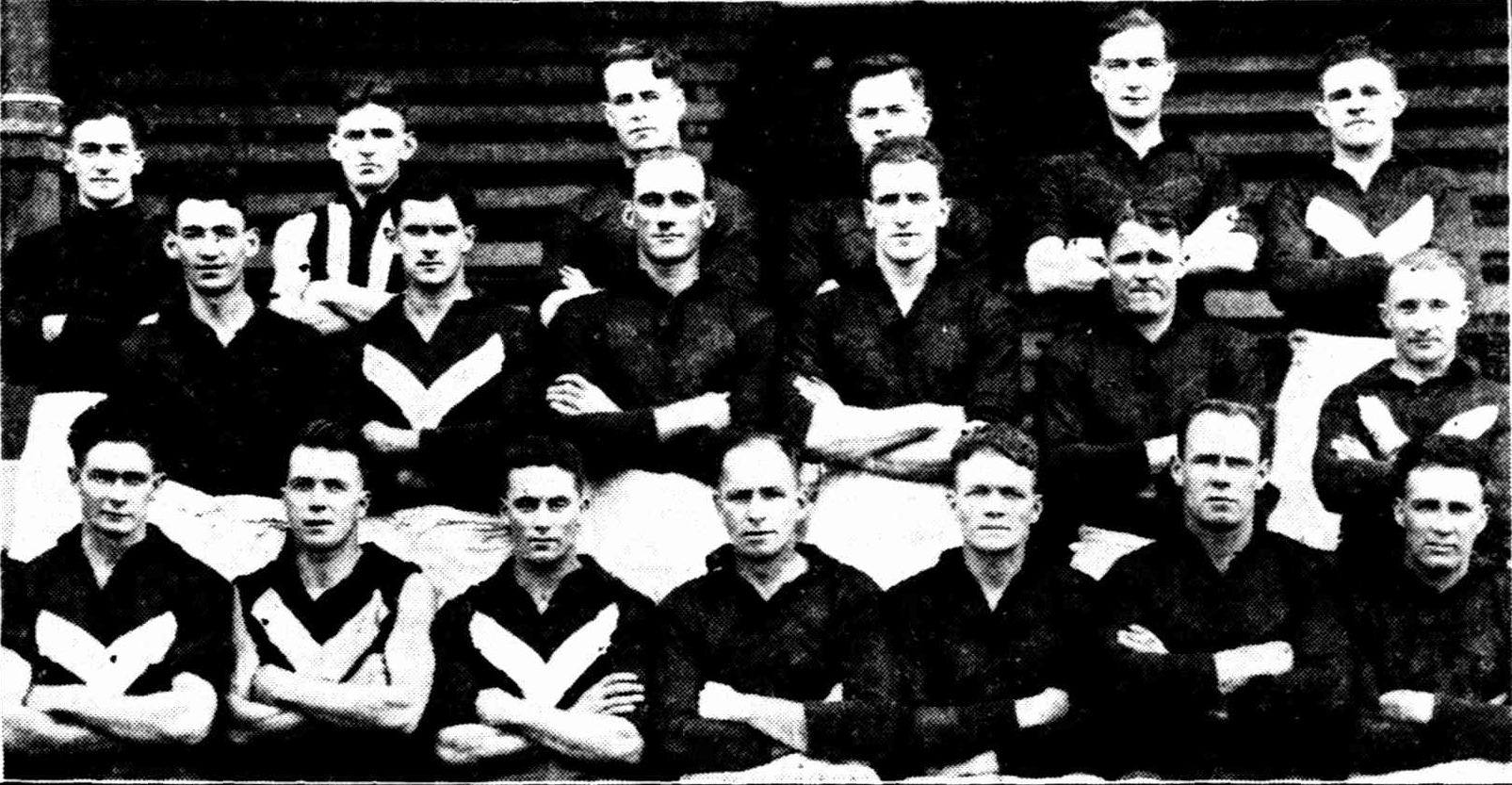
The Victorian Football League’s Interstate team that drew with South Australia, in Adelaide, 13.10 (88) to 11.22 (88) on Saturday, 16 June 1928. Back Row: Jack Moriarty, Albert "Leeter" Collier, Hugh Dunbar, Gordon "Nuts" Coventry, Bob Johnson, Jack Baggott. Second Row: Jack Vosti, Charlie Stanbridge, Arthur Stevens, Alex Duncan, Dick Taylor, Ted Baker. Front Row: Basil McCormack, Arthur Rayson, Allan Geddes (vice-captain), Syd Coventry (captain), Barney Carr, Arthur “Bull” Coghlan, Herbert White.

== Cricket ==
Baggott played 126 first eleven games of Melbourne District Cricket with the Northcote Cricket Club between 1924 and 1944.

== Personal life ==
Baggott was born in Pietermaritzburg, Colony of Natal (Now part of KwaZulu-Natal in South Africa) to Australian parents. The family returned to Australia while Baggott was a young boy.

He was the older brother of Ron Baggott who played for the Melbourne Football Club.

== See also ==
- 1927 Melbourne Carnival
