= Bob Johnson (Australian footballer, born 1902) =

Australian rules footballer (1902–1981)

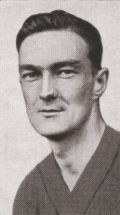

Personal information
- Full name: Robert Charles Johnson
- Born: 27 June 1902; Quambatook, Victoria
- Died: 26 January 1981 (aged 78); Caulfield South
- Original team: Northcote (VFA)
- Height: 191 cm (6 ft 3 in)
- Weight: 83 kg (183 lb)
- Position: Centre half forward

Playing career^{1}
Years	Club	Games (Goals)
1923–1925	Northcote	29 (37)
1926–1933	Melbourne	113 (302)
Total		142 (339)
- ^{1} Playing statistics correct to the end of 1933.

Robert Charles Johnson (27 June 1902 – 26 January 1981) was an Australian rules footballer who played for Melbourne in the Victorian Football League (VFL).

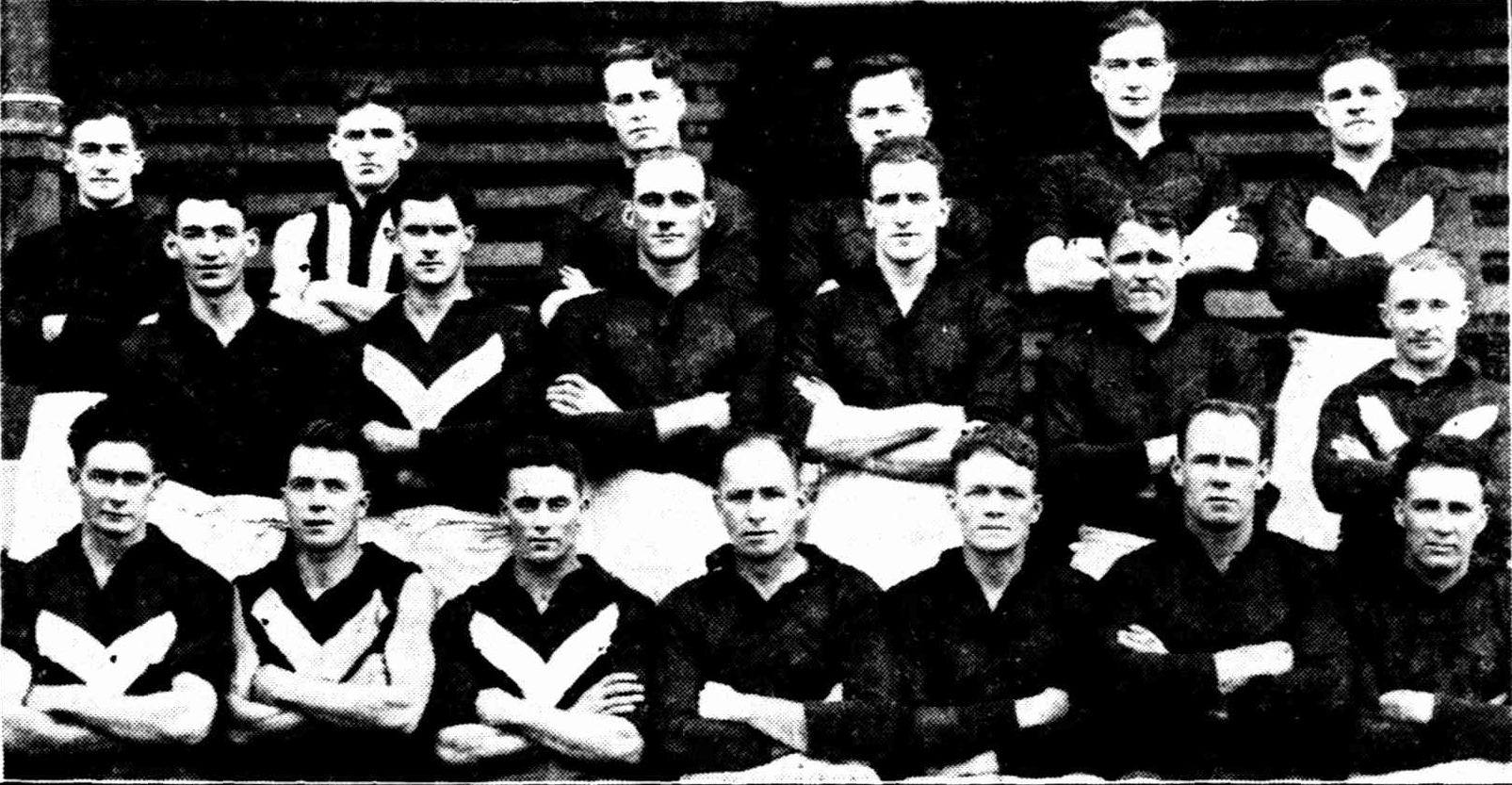
The Victorian Football League's Interstate team that drew with South Australia, in Adelaide, 13.10 (88) to 11.22 (88) on Saturday, 16 June 1928. Back Row: Jack Moriarty, Albert Collier, Hugh Dunbar, Gordon Coventry, Bob Johnson, Jack Baggott. Second Row: Jack Vosti, Charlie Stanbridge, Arthur Stevens, Alex Duncan, Dick Taylor, Ted Baker. Front Row: Basil McCormack, Arthur Rayson, Allan Geddes (vice-captain), Syd Coventry (captain), Barney Carr, Arthur Coghlan, Herbert White.

== Family ==
The son of Swedish born Robert Johnson (originally "Jonasson") (1836–1917), and his second wife, Elizabeth Ann Johnson (1865–1946), née Armstrong, Robert Charles Johnson was born at Quambatook, Victoria on 27 June 1902.

He married Thelma Walker (1904–1997), in Windsor, Victoria, on 16 June 1925. Their son Robert Bruce Johnson (1935–2001), also known as "Bob", played 140 games for Melbourne in the 1950s and early 1960s.

== Education ==
He was educated at St Patrick's College, Ballarat.

== Football ==
A key position player, Johnson was mostly used at centre half forward.

=== Northcote (VFA) ===
Johnson began his senior football career with Northcote in the Victorian Football Association (VFA) where he won the competition's best and fairest award the Woodham Cup in 1924.

=== Melbourne (VFL) ===
Granted a permit by Northcote in April 1926, he was recruited by Melbourne, and had an immediate impact on the league. Johnson finished equal second in the 1926 Brownlow Medal and kicked six goals in Melbourne's winning grand final. He also earned Victorian selection at the season's end.

He twice topped Melbourne's goal-kicking during his career, in 1928 with 55 goals and in 1933 with 62. He retired before the 1934 season began.

== Death ==
He died at Caulfield South on 26 January 1981, and was buried at Springvale Botanical Cemetery on 29 January 1981.

== See also ==
- VFA Best & Fairest - Woodham Cup: 1923 to 1925
