= Basil McCormack =

Australian rules footballer (1904–1973)

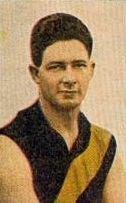
- McCormack 1926 football card

Personal information
- Full name: Basil Milton McCormack
- Born: 3 August 1904; Rochester, Victoria
- Died: 19 February 1973 (aged 68); Bentleigh, Victoria
- Original team: Rochester
- Height: 180 cm (5 ft 11 in)
- Weight: 79.5 kg (175 lb)
- Position: Half-back flank

Playing career^{1}
Years	Club	Games (Goals)
1925–1936	Richmond	200 (1)
1937–1940	New Town Football Club	57 (21)
Total		257 (22)

Coaching career^{3}
Years	Club	Games (W–L–D)
1937–1939	New Town Football Club	
1947	Franklin Football Club	
- ^{1} Playing statistics correct to the end of 1940.^{3} Coaching statistics correct as of 1947.

Career highlights
- Richmond Premiership Player 1932, 1934; Richmond Grand Final Player 1927, 1928, 1931, 1933; Richmond Best and Fairest 1927-1928; Interstate Games:- 13; Richmond – Life Member (1934); Richmond – Committee Member (1955–1971); Richmond – Team of the Century; Richmond – Hall of Fame – inducted 2004

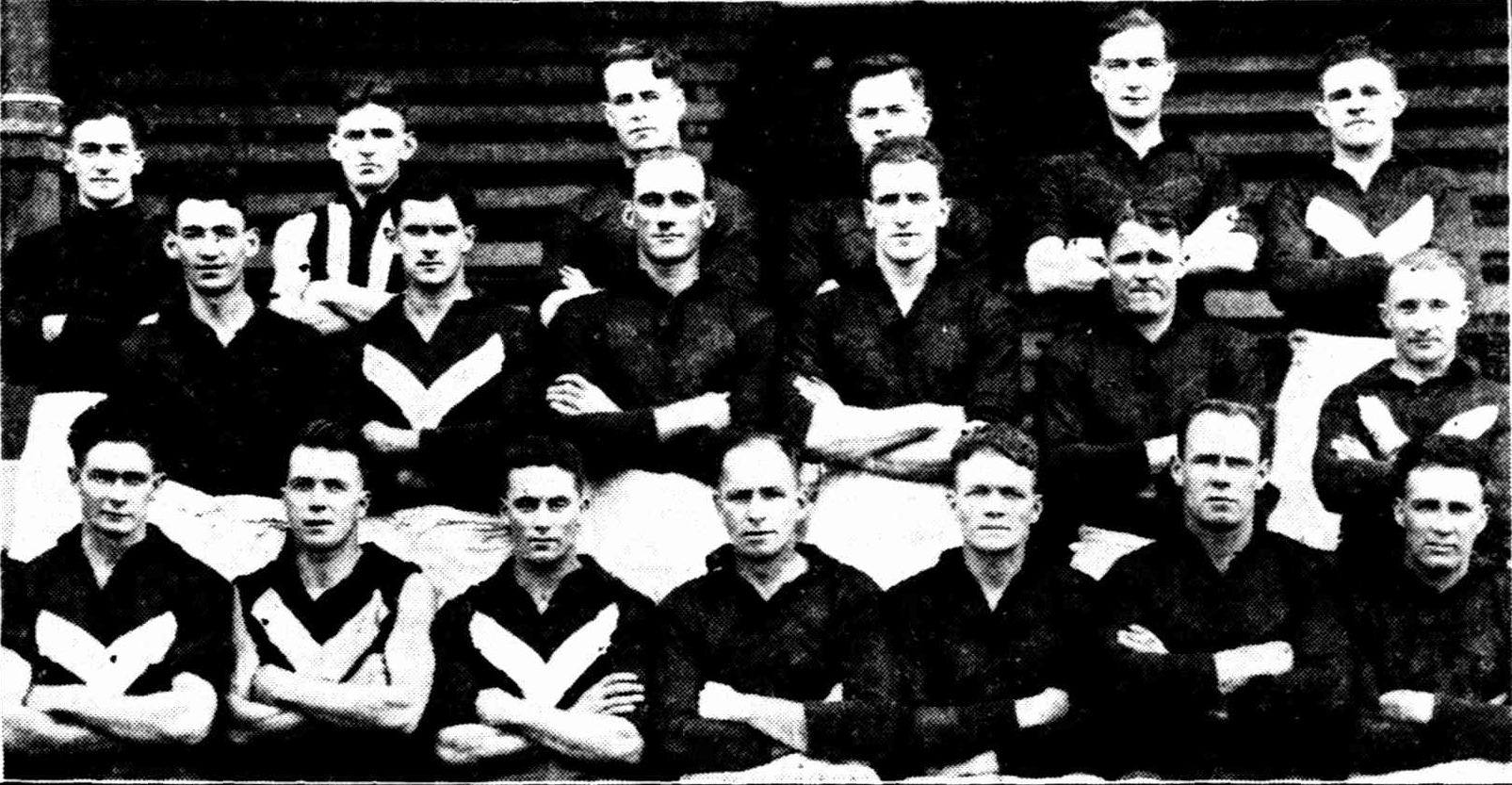
The Victorian Football League's Interstate team that drew with South Australia, in Adelaide, 13.10 (88) to 11.22 (88) on Saturday, 16 June 1928. Back Row: Jack Moriarty, Albert "Leeter" Collier, Hugh Dunbar, Gordon "Nuts" Coventry, Bob Johnson, Jack Baggott. Second Row: Jack Vosti, Charlie Stanbridge, Arthur Stevens, Alex Duncan, Dick Taylor, Ted Baker. Front Row: Basil McCormack, Arthur Rayson, Allan Geddes (vice-captain), Syd Coventry (captain), Barney Carr, Arthur “Bull” Coghlan, Herbert White.

Basil Milton McCormack (3 August 1904 – 19 February 1973) was an Australian rules footballer who played in the Victorian Football League (VFL) between 1925 and 1936 for the Richmond Football Club.

== Family ==
The son of Michael McCormack and Mary McCormack (1865–1950), née Foley, he was born at Rochester, Victoria on 3 August 1904.

== Richmond ==
A left-foot kick, recruited from Rochester, he played 200 senior games for the Richmond Football Club as a half-back flanker, and represented Victoria on 13 occasions.

=== Double debut ===
Granted his clearance from Rochester to Richmond on Friday, 1 May 1925, he played his first match for Richmond, selected on the half-back flank, against Hawthorn, on 2 May 1925 (round 1). He played well; with the match report noting that "McCormack … who marks and kicks well, [was] looking a very likely man".

It was also the Hawthorn team's first match in the VFL competition, the former VFA club having been admitted (along with Footscray and North Melbourne) in the January of that year.

== Tribunal ==
He was suspended on two occasions: the first arose from the final on 14 September 1929 for striking (eight weeks), and the second was on 6 May 1933 for elbowing (six weeks).

== New Town Football Club ==
Approached by Cananore in 1936, he was appointed captain-coach of the Tasmanian Football League's New Town Football Club in 1937. He was captain-coach for three seasons (1937 to 1939), and played a number of senior games in 1940.

== Franklin Football Club ==
In 1947 he was appointed coach of the Franklin Football Club in the Huon Football Association.

== St Virgil's Old Scholars Football Club ==
He coached St. Virgil's in the Tasmanian Amateur Football League from 1948 to 1950.

== Military ==
Having enlisted in the militia in 1939, the transferred to the Second AIF in 1943, and saw action in the Pacific Islands.

== See also ==
- 1927 Melbourne Carnival
