= Charlie Stanbridge =

Australian rules footballer and coach (1899–1971)

Personal information
- Full name: Charles Arthur Stanbridge
- Born: 9 January 1899; Preston, Victoria
- Died: 13 February 1971 (aged 72); Blackburn South, Victoria
- Original team: Williamstown (VFA)
- Height: 191 cm (6 ft 3 in)
- Weight: 86 kg (190 lb)

Playing career^{1}
Years	Club	Games (Goals)
1925–1929	South Melbourne	69 (12)
- ^{1} Playing statistics correct to the end of 1929.

Charles Arthur Stanbridge (9 January 1899 – 13 February 1971) was an Australian rules footballer who played with South Melbourne in the VFL during the 1920s.

== Family ==
The son of Arthur Ernest Stanbridge (1872–1941), and Edith Emily Stanbridge (1871–1904), née Cockery, Charles Arthur Stanbridge was born in Preston, Victoria on 9 January 1899.

He married Elizabeth Ann Robinson (1899–1968) in 1920.

== Military service ==
With his father's formal permission, he enlisted in the First AIF in July 1917.

== Football ==
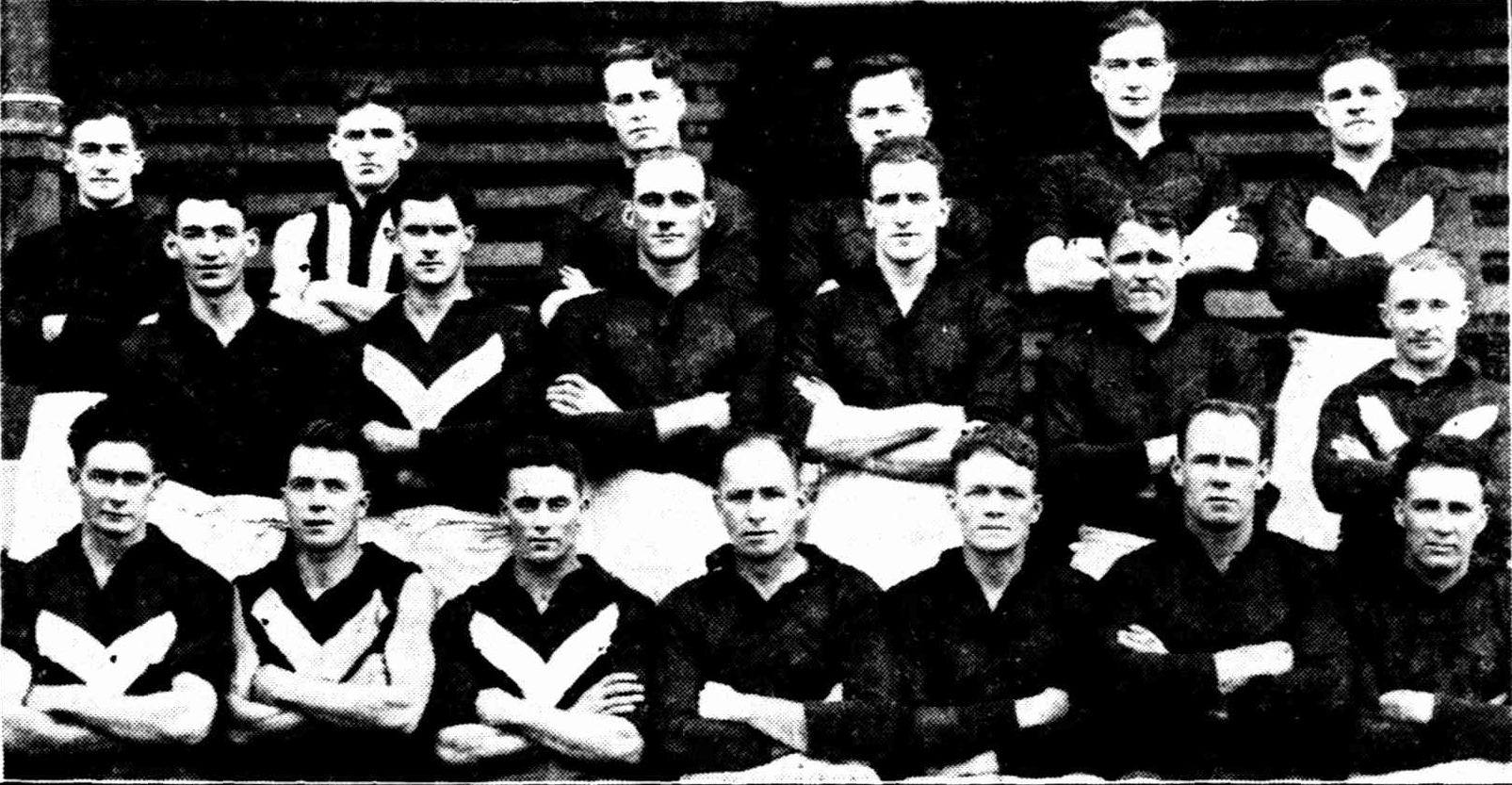
The Victorian Football League's Interstate team that drew with South Australia, in Adelaide, 13.10 (88) to 11.22 (88) on Saturday, 16 June 1928. Back Row: Jack Moriarty, Albert "Leeter" Collier, Hugh Dunbar, Gordon "Nuts" Coventry, Bob Johnson, Jack Baggott. Second Row: Jack Vosti, Charlie Stanbridge, Arthur Stevens, Alex Duncan, Dick Taylor, Ted Baker. Front Row: Basil McCormack, Arthur Rayson, Allan Geddes (vice-captain), Syd Coventry (captain), Barney Carr, Arthur "Bull" Coghlan, Herbert White.

=== Williamstown (VFA) ===
Stanbridge began his senior career in the Victorian Football Association at Williamstown in 1921, where he was a member of the club's premiership team.

=== Port Melbourne (VFA) ===
He crossed to Port Melbourne for the following three seasons, winning a premiership with the club in 1922.

=== South Melbourne (VFL) ===
He joined VFL club South Melbourne in 1925, where he played for five seasons, winning South's best and fairest award in 1928 and being appointed captain for the 1929 season. Stanbridge also represented Victoria in interstate football, appearing seven times.

=== Williamstown (VFA) ===
He returned to Williamstown, and won a Recorder Cup and VFA Medal during his time with the club, which he coached in 1933.

=== Camberwell (VFA) ===
Stanbridge played a practice match with Camberwell and applied for a clearance from Williamstown in early 1934, but started the season with Williamstown, before crossing over to play with Camberwell in late June, 1934. Ended up playing six games in 1934.

=== South Melbourne Districts ===
Stanbridge was appointed as coach in 1935.

== Death ==
He died in Blackburn South, Victoria on 13 February 1971.
