= Alex Duncan =

Australian rules footballer

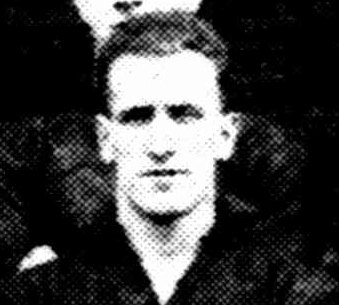

Personal information
- Full name: George Robert Alexander Duncan
- Born: 25 February 1900; Romsey, Victoria
- Died: 11 October 1984 (aged 84)
- Original team: Romsey
- Debut: Round 1, 1921, Carlton vs. Richmond, at Punt Road
- Height: 188 cm (6 ft 2 in)
- Weight: 87 kg (192 lb)

Playing career^{1}
Years	Club	Games (Goals)
1921–1924; 1926–1930	Carlton	141 (88)

Representative team honours
Years	Team	Games (Goals)
1924–1928	Victoria (VFL)	

Coaching career
Years	Club	Games (W–L–D)
1925	Stratford	
1935	Coburg	
- ^{1} Playing statistics correct to the end of 1935.

George Robert Alexander Duncan (25 February 1900 – 11 October 1984) was an Australian rules footballer who played for Carlton in the Victorian Football League, for Stratford in the Gippsland Football League, for Coburg Football Club in the Victorian Football Association, and for Havelock in the Industrial Football League (at the age of 36).

Duncan made his debut for Carlton in Round 1 of the 1921 season. He retired from VFL football in 1930, having played 141 senior games for Carlton, and four interstate games for Victoria.

He is especially remembered for his performance in "Duncan's match".

== Footballer ==
=== Carlton ===
He made his debut for Carlton on 7 May 1921, playing on the half-forward flank, against Richmond, at the Punt Road ground. A crowd of 32,000 saw Carlton defeat Richmond by 9 points, 7.11 (53) to 8.14 (62).

He played 15 senior matches in 1924; and, with 27 goals, he was Carlton's top goalkicker.

=== Stratford ===
Alex. Duncan (Stratford)

At the annual meeting of the Stratford club last
January it was decided to secure a coach for the
year 1925, and after much discussion Alex
Duncan, of Carlton, was elected. This is the third
year that the club has been in the Gippsland
League competition. In the previous two years
they had won only two matches. Duncan has
come to the rescue, and has done wonders with
the team. He is classed as one of the greatest
footballers Gippsland has ever seen; his kicking,
which covers long distances, and his aerial work
being a feature of every match. One Gippsland
barracker was heard to remark, "I pay 2/- just to
see Duncan's marking and kicking."

— The Sporting Globe, September 1925

Apparently for the sake of his wife's health, he decided to leave the city, and Carlton; and, in January 1925, a public meeting at Stratford, Victoria appointed Duncan the captain-coach of the Stratford Football Club. He was given a house, rent-free, a job, and was also to be paid an additional salary of £8 a week as captain-coach.

Having left Carlton on good terms, "R. A. Duncan" was granted a clearance from Carlton to Stratford on 25 March 1925.

On 2 May 1925, "Alex. Duncan (Stratford's coach and captain) marked his first appearance in Gippsland football… by winning the toss, playing a good game, kicking five goals and leading his side to victory [over Rosedale, 13.14 (92) to 9.7 (61)]".

The Stratford team, which had not won a single match in 1924, and only two in 1923, won a number of matches under Duncan, despite problems with an ever-increasing absence of stronger players as the season went on, and were still potential finalists until they were soundly beaten by Maffra, 7.11 (53) to 2.4 (16), in the last match of the home-and-away season on 19 September 1925 (the match was marred by a very strong wind blowing across the ground for the entire match).

At the end of the 1925 season, he returned to Melbourne, ready to resume his career with Carlton the following season.

=== Return to Carlton ===
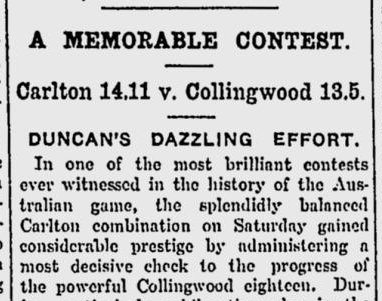
The Age, Monday, 27 June 1927

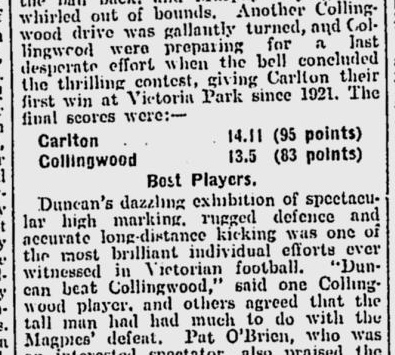
The Age, Monday, 27 June 1927

Moved from the forward line to centre half-back, he played his first return game for Carlton, against Melbourne at Princes Park on 8 May 1926 (round two). There was an influenza epidemic in Melbourne at the time, and Duncan was bedridden on the day of the first match of the season.

=== "Duncan's match" ===
The encounter between Carlton and Collingwood Football Club at Victoria Park on Saturday, 25 June 1927, in which a strong Carlton team outmuscled, outplayed, and (coming from behind) beat a champion Collingwood team playing at its peak, is one of the most famous encounters in the game's history; and is remembered as "Duncan's Match".

Playing at centre-halfback, the "impassable" and "unbeatable" Duncan dominated the game as, perhaps, no other player has done before or since.

According to The Age, "Duncan's meteoric marking and wonderfully dashing defence was the most sparkling individual performance of the season".

According to The Argus, "Duncan his played many fine games for Carlton, and has also been a tower of strength in interstate teams, but he has never been seen to better advantage. His marking was superb, his judgment faultless, and his kicking splendid, while his dash turned many attacks."

He took at least 33 marks (some claim he had taken as many as 45) and his beautiful drop-kicks on that day were as flawless as his marking.

Carlton won the match 14.11 (95) to Collingwood's 13.5 (83).

Collingwood, a football club not generally known for magnanimous gestures towards its opponents, were so impressed with Duncan's outstanding performance (perhaps, even, a best of all time performance) that they had the match ball suitably mounted and inscribed and presented the trophy to Duncan.

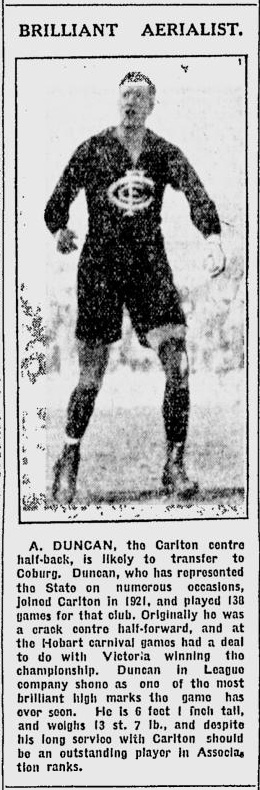
The Age, Friday, 17 April 1931

=== Coburg ===
He went to the VFA's Coburg Football Club in 1931, and was appointed the captain-coach of Coburg in 1935.

In his first match for Coburg, against Preston, on 2 May 1931, playing against Preston's Roy Cazaly, "Duncan was a tower of tremendous strength at centre half-back"; however, he sustained several internal injuries, including bruised kidneys, in the match, and he was forced to miss the next match because his doctor had confined him to bed.

His first senior match in 1936 for Coburg was on 13 June 1936 (round nine), when he played at centre half-back against Preston ("Alex Duncan gave a creditable performance at centre half-back in the first game for the season"), and Coburg won by 33 points. He also played for Coburg on 18 July 1936, despite having been cleared to play for Havelock.

=== Havelock ===
In 1936, aged 36, he was granted a permit to play for the Havelock Football Club, representing the Havelock tobacco factory of W.D. & H.O. Wills, in the "Saturday Morning League" competition, conducted by the Industrial Football League. He played in Havelock's Grand Final 6.16 (52) to 4.12 (36) loss to Victoria Brewery on 22 August 1936. The Havelock club withdrew from the competition before the start of the 1937 season, due to its difficulty in attracting sufficient suitable players. It returned to the competition in 1939.

== Tribunals ==
Despite coming a close equal second with Melbourne's Dick Taylor to Collingwood's Syd Coventry in the 1927 Brownlow Medal, having been declared best on the ground in six matches, compared with Coventry's seven (at that stage only one vote was given to one player in each game), Duncan had quite a history of rough play.

=== Carlton (July 1922) ===
During the particularly torrid match against Collingwood at Princes Park on 29 July 1922, which Carlton won, Duncan scored three goals despite being knocked out on two separate occasions. Eric Cock was found guilty of punching Duncan (he claimed that Duncan had kicked him in the ankle and verbally abused him), and was suspended for six matches. Duncan was found guilty of having elbowed Harry Saunders, and was suspended for three matches. Saunders pleaded guilty to punching Duncan, pleading provocation; he was suspended for six matches and was fined £5 by the police for his assault on Duncan.

=== Carlton (June 1924) ===
In a torrid, low-scoring match at a windswept Princes Park on 21 June 1924, against Richmond, which Richmond won 5.8 (38) to 3.10 (38), Duncan was reported three times: for elbowing Reuben Reid, for kicking George Rudolph whilst he was on the ground, and for making an offensive gesture towards Boundary Umpire Johnson. Duncan was acquitted of all three charges due to lack of corroborating evidence; whilst Richmond's Reid, cited for "charging" Horrie Clover, was suspended for three matches, and Donald Don of Richmond, cited for "charging" Newton Chandler from behind, was suspended for eleven matches.

=== Stratford (May 1925) ===
In his second match as captain-coach of Stratford, Duncan was reported, by the Sale Football Club (i.e., rather than any of the match officials), for using obscene language on the playing arena, directed at N. "Tiny" Wilson — a 6 ft 4in (193 cm) member of the Sale team — during the match against Sale Football Club on 9 May 1925.

In the tribunal hearing the field umpire (D. E. Paterson) stated that Duncan had been awarded a mark; and, on the way back to take his kick, Duncan was struck by Wilson with a deliberate blow, and "was 'out' for about five minutes". Play resumed after ten minutes; and the umpire stated that he "did not hear any language". In giving his evidence, Duncan stated that after he had taken the mark he was kicked on the leg and, without using any bad language, he had said "Cut it out Wilson, you have been at it all day." He was then struck by Wilson.

The Sale delegate admitted that Wilson had kicked Duncan. Wilson claimed that, he had "struck Duncan under great provocation" and that, as Duncan went back to take his kick, Duncan had said "You mongrel — " (the newspaper did not print the word). Wilson claimed that he had replied "What! you say that again and I'll punch you under the ear", to which, he claimed, Duncan had replied "You dirty — "; and, he said, it was only then that he had struck Duncan. The Stratford delegate made the obvious comment that, if such an interchange had occurred, ""Duncan would have been prepared for a blow"; when, in fact, he was most obviously not expecting any sort of attack.

Duncan protested that Sale had only complained to retaliate for Wood having been reported by the field umpire. After much discussion Wood was suspended for four matches (for striking Duncan) and Duncan two (for using obscene language to Wilson).

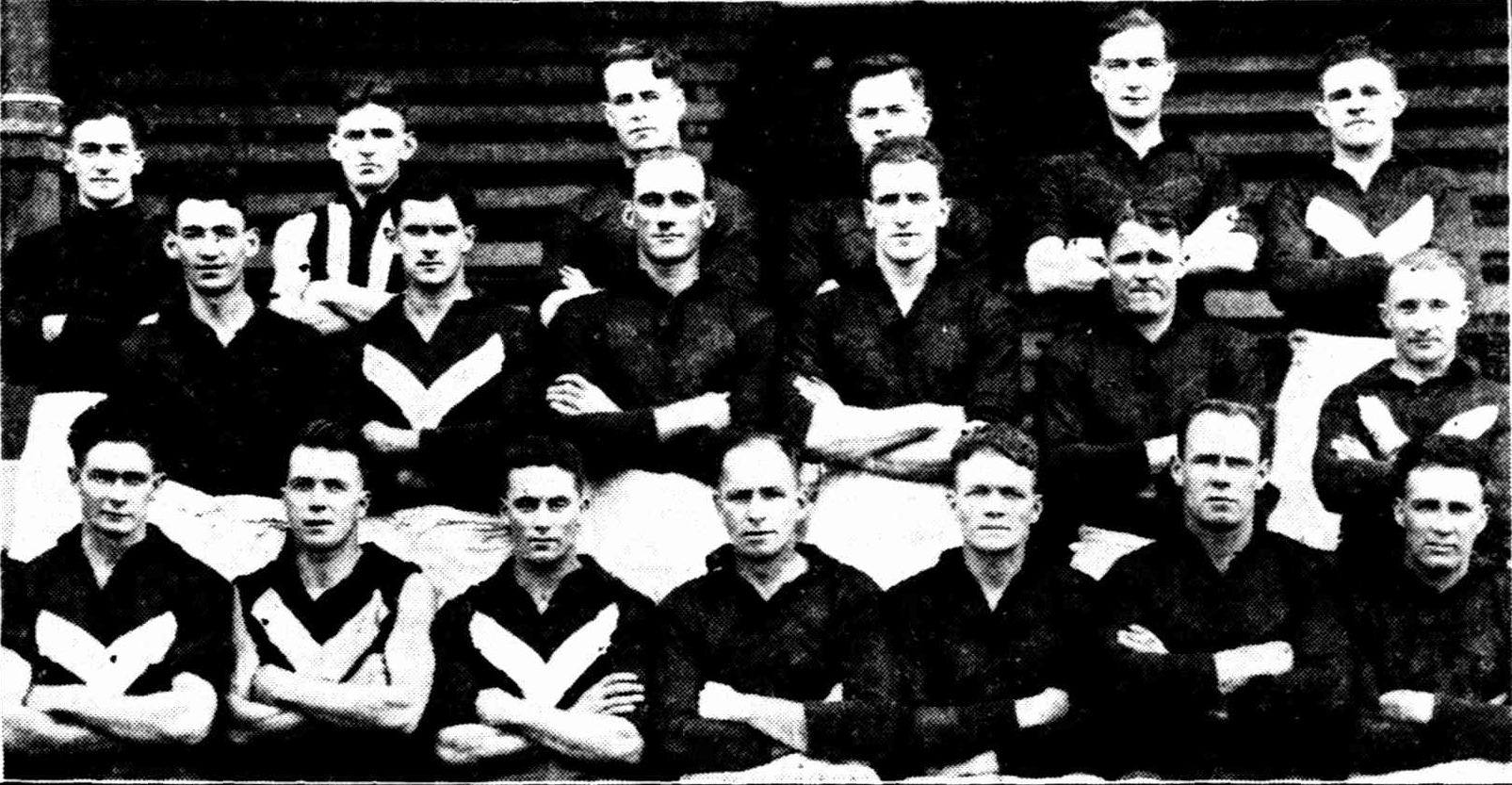
The Victorian Football League’s Interstate team that drew with South Australia, in Adelaide, 13.10 (88) to 11.22 (88) on Saturday, 16 June 1928. Back Row: Jack Moriarty, Albert "Leeter" Collier, Hugh Dunbar, Gordon "Nuts" Coventry, Bob Johnson, Jack Baggott Second Row: Jack Vosti, Charlie Stanbridge, Arthur Stevens, Alex Duncan, Dick Taylor, Ted Baker. Front Row: Basil McCormack, Arthur Rayson, Allan Geddes (vice-captain), Syd Coventry (captain), Barney Carr, Arthur “Bull” Coghlan, Herbert White.

=== Stratford (September 1925) ===
Duncan was reported for charging a Bairnsdale player, during the Stratford-Bairnsdale match on 12 September 1925. He was also reported for threatening Umpire Rowe, the field umpire. Eventually, due to a technicality (the case had not been submitted to the tribunal within seven days of the match) the case was not heard, and the charges against Duncan were consequently dismissed.

=== Carlton (May 1926) ===
During the round three match against Geelong, at Geelong on 15 May 1926, Duncan was reported for the "unseemly conduct" of throwing the football into the face of Lloyd Hagger, the Geelong forward who had been the VFL's leading goal-kicker in the preceding season (1925). Duncan was, perhaps, the best player for Carlton on the day. Hagger had been awarded a free kick, against Duncan, in the second quarter, because Duncan had pushed him in the back; as Hagger began to raise himself from the ground, and prepare to take his kick, Duncan spitefully threw the ball into his face. Duncan was found guilty and was suspended for four matches.

=== Coburg (October 1934) ===
In the VFA Grand Final match between Northcote and Coburg on 6 October 1934, Duncan was playing full-forward, and kicked eight of Coburg's ten goals; a soundly defeated Coburg lost the match 19.16 (130) to 10.9 (69). Two Northcote players were reported for offenses against Duncan during the match: Jack Haskett was charged with "having allegedly struck A. Duncan", and Frank Ackland was charged with "having allegedly struck and tripped A. Duncan". Both were found guilty; Haskett was suspended for four matches, and Ackland was reprimanded.

=== Coburg (August 1935) ===
During the 1935 VF first semi-final played on 17 August 1935, between Coburg and Camberwell, Duncan (Coburg's captain-coach) was charged with deliberately pushing Ernest Dyball of Camberwell after a free kick had been awarded in the last quarter of the match. Duncan pleaded guilty; but argued in his own defence that he had not heard the umpire's whistle blow, and had pushed Dyball to delay the play. Given Duncan's defence, the tribunal considered that there was reasonable doubt whether Duncan had, indeed, deliberately pushed Dyball in the full knowledge that Dyball had been awarded a free kick, and dismissed the charge.

== After football ==
Duncan served in the Australian Army from 3 November 1941 to 6 October 1945. At the time of his enlistment he was married to Olive Duncan.

== See also ==
- 1927 Melbourne Carnival
