= Jack Moriarty =

Australian rules footballer (1901–1980)

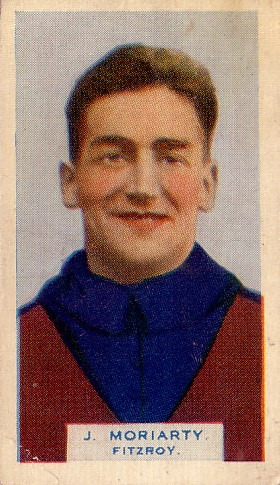

Personal information
- Full name: Geoffrey John Moriarty
- Born: 30 April 1901; Fitzroy, Victoria
- Died: 5 September 1980 (aged 79); Heidelberg, Victoria
- Original team: Essendon Association
- Height: 178 cm (5 ft 10 in)
- Weight: 62 kg (137 lb)
- Position: Full-forward

Playing career^{1}
Years	Club	Games (Goals)
1922	Essendon	13 (36)
1924–33	Fitzroy	157 (626)
Total		170 (662)
- ^{1} Playing statistics correct to the end of 1933.

Career highlights
- Fitzroy captain: 1933; VFL leading goalkicker: 1924; Fitzroy Club Champion: 1927; Essendon leading goalkicker: 1922; 9× Fitzroy leading goalkicker: 1924, 1925, 1926, 1927, 1928, 1929, 1931, 1932, 1933

Jack Moriarty (30 April 1901 – 5 September 1980) was an Australian rules footballer and champion goal-kicker in the Victorian Football League (VFL).

== Family ==
The son of the Fitzroy full-back, dual premiership player, and first coach, Geoffrey John Moriarty (1871–1948), and Mary Anne Moriarty (1879–1964), née Jackson, Geoffrey John Moriarty was born at Fitzroy, Victoria on 30 April 1901.

He married Isabel Sophia Nairn (1901–1987) in 1924.

== Football ==
Moriarty was a lightly built full-forward — despite standing only 5 ft 10 in (178 cm), and weighing approximately 60 kg, he had the ability to jump over opponents and take strong over-head marks — who became a spectacular success after leaving Essendon Football Club at the end of 1923 and crossing to Fitzroy Football Club.

=== Essendon (VFA) ===
He played in every home-and-away game (17 matches) for the Essendon Association Football Club (a.k.a. "Essendon A") in 1921, the club's final season in the Victorian Football Association (VFA)'s competition.

=== Essendon (VFL) ===
Moriarty transferred to the Essendon VFL club in 1922, playing thirteen games at full-forward, including the Semi-final, against Carlton, on 23 September 1922.

He was controversially dropped from the team for the Preliminary Final, against Fitzroy, on 7 October 1922, and half-back flanker Greg Stockdale moved to full-forward in his place. Although Essendon lost the match, 6.6 (45) to 9.14 (68), Stockdale kicked five of Essendon's six goals (one with his right foot, despite being a natural left-foot kick).

Based upon that performance, Stockdale became the team's full-forward in 1923 — Stockdale scored 68 goals in the 1923 season breaking the VFL's (then) record of 66 goals set jointly by Fitzroy's Jimmy Freake and Collingwood's Dick Lee in 1915, and Moriarty was unable to break back into the senior team.

However, Stockdale's record was broken the next season (in 1924), by Moriarty, who kicked 82 goals in his first season with Fitzroy.

=== Fitzroy (VFL) ===
In each of his first three matches with Fitzroy, Moriarty kicked seven goals en route to a then VFL season record of 82.

=== VFL Representative teams ===
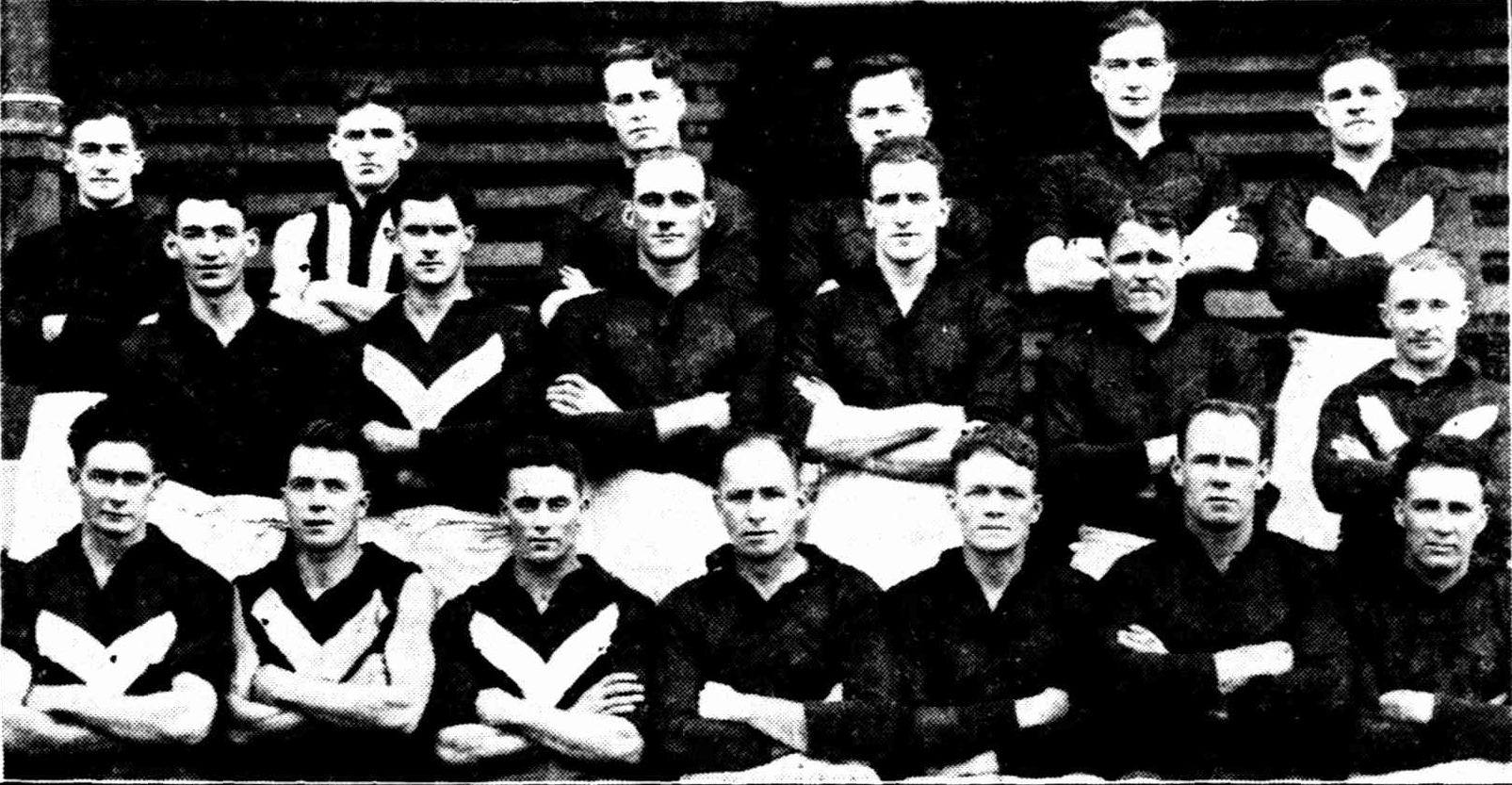
The Victorian Football League's Interstate team that drew with South Australia, in Adelaide, 13.10 (88) to 11.22 (88) on Saturday, 16 June 1928. Back Row: Jack Moriarty, Albert "Leeter" Collier, Hugh Dunbar, Gordon "Nuts" Coventry, Bob Johnson, Jack Baggott. Second Row: Jack Vosti, Charlie Stanbridge, Arthur Stevens, Alex Duncan, Dick Taylor, Ted Baker. Front Row: Basil McCormack, Arthur Rayson, Allan Geddes (vice-captain), Syd Coventry (captain), Barney Carr, Arthur "Bull" Coghlan, Herbert White.

Moriarty represented the VFL at the Hobart carnival in 1924 and went on to become a permanent fixture in Victorian sides for most of the next decade.

=== Goal-kicker ===
He topped Fitzroy's goal kicking list every year between 1924 and 1933, except for 1930, and was voted the club's best and fairest player in 1927 during an era when an award of this type was not made every season.

At the end of his career, Moriarty had scored 662 goals in his 170-game VFL career, at an average of almost four goals per game.

His total of 626 career goals for Fitzroy remained the club record when Fitzroy exited the VFL/AFL in 1996.

== Death ==
He died on 5 September 1980.

== Australian Football Hall of Fame ==
In 2004 Moriarty was inducted into the Australian Football Hall of Fame.

== Player honors ==
- Fitzroy best and fairest 1927.
- Fitzroy Leading goalkicker 9 times (1924, 1925, 1926, 1927, 1928, 1929, 1931, 1932, 1933).
- Fitzroy Team of the Century.
- VFL Leading goalkicker Medal 1924.
- Essendon Leading goalkicker 1922.
- Victorian representative (11 games, 42 goals).

== See also ==
- 1924 Hobart Carnival
- 1927 Melbourne Carnival
