= John F. Shelton =

Australian rules footballer (1903–1984)

John Shelton

Personal information
- Full name: John Frederick Shelton
- Born: 29 January 1903; Melton, Victoria
- Died: 8 March 1984 (aged 81); Dandenong, Victoria
- Original team: Koo Wee Rup
- Height: 178 cm (5 ft 10 in)
- Weight: 83 kg (183 lb)

Playing career^{1}
| Years | Club | Games (Goals) |
| 1925–1928 | St Kilda | 57 (152) |
- ^{1} Playing statistics correct to the end of 1928.

Career highlights
- St Kilda leading goalkicker – 1925, 1926, 1927; Victoria state representative: 4 times

John Frederick Shelton (29 January 1903 – 8 March 1984) was an Australian rules footballer who played for the St Kilda Football Club in the Victorian Football League (VFL).

== Football ==
From Koo Wee Rup, in southeast Victoria, he played for St Kilda from 1925 to 1928. His brother, James Patrick Shelton (1897—1970) also played three senior games with St Kilda: two at the end of 1921, and one in round eight 1922.

A forward, he was St Kilda's leading goalkicker for three consecutive seasons in 1925, 1926 and 1927.

He also represented Victoria four times.

7 August 1926, Corio Oval

Geelong hit the lead in the third quarter, a signal for
St Kilda to apply greater force. Down went Chambers of
Geelong, a boundary umpire histrionically threatening to
report a St Kilda player. Next, Rayson, a brilliant Geelong
player and also the Geelong caretaker, fell to the ground
and with broken ribs. He was carried dramatically to his
house within the grounds.
It was the signal for all hell to break loose. When the
bell rang, the Saints sensed big trouble and tried to leave
the ground hurriedly; Shelton and Stan Hepburn were
engulfed on the field by swarming, shouting barrackers.
The Geelong supporters had become an unruly, vengeful
mob.
Shelton was hit by an umbrella wielded with wounding
purpose and suffered a torrent of abuse and blows.
Another Geelong fan wrenched a picket from the fence
and advanced on Shelton. Shelton smartly dodged the
blow, grabbed the picket and held it to defend himself.
A mounted policeman rode up, tore the picket from
Shelton's hands and with arrogant urgency hustled
Shelton and Hepburn up the race and into the rooms.
(Main and Allen, 2002, p.336)

== Tribunal ==
On Saturday, 7 August 1926, as the extensive contemporary newspaper reports attest, Shelton was involved in an act of violence directed at Geelong's full-back Arthur Rayson (who also worked as the caretaker at the Corio Oval), through which Rayson received broken ribs, amongst other injuries. The spectators' response to Rayson's injury, specifically directed at Shelton was such that Shelton required police protection from attacks with fence pickets.

In his last season (1928), he was charged with attempting to kick Essendon's Tom Clarke in the ankle, during the eighth round match at Windy Hill on 4 June 1928. Given the possibility that Shelton might have been kicking at the ball, rather than either intending to kick Clarke in the ankle or mis-timing a trip, the tribunal found that the charge had not been sustained.

On 4 August 1928, during a torrid match against Carlton, at the Junction Oval, Shelton was reported for striking Carlton's Ray Brew in the third quarter; the tribunal sustained the charge and Shelton was suspended for eight matches. He did not play senior VFL football again.
