= Harry Saunders =

Australian rules footballer and coach

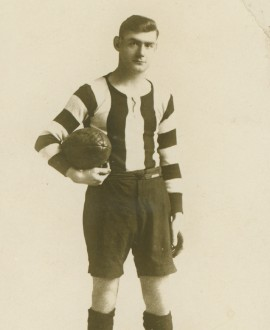
- Saunders during his Collignwood career

Personal information
- Full name: Henry George Saunders
- Born: 21 May 1898; Portland, Victoria
- Died: 9 December 1930 (aged 32); East Melbourne, Victoria
- Original team: Collingwood Senior Cadets
- Debut: Round 4, 1916, Collingwood vs. Richmond, at Victoria Park
- Height: 175 cm (5 ft 9 in)
- Weight: 76 kg (168 lb)

Playing career^{1}
Years	Club	Games (Goals)
1916–1926	Collingwood	135 (10)

Coaching career
Years	Club	Games (W–L–D)
1926	Footscray	10 (3–7–0)
- ^{1} Playing statistics correct to the end of 1926.

Henry George 'Harry' Saunders (21 May 1898 – 9 December 1930) was an Australian rules footballer who played for Collingwood and coached Footscray in the Victorian Football League (VFL).

== Family ==
The son of Henry Saunders (1859-1921), and Hannah Saunders (1863-1941), née Guiney, Henry George Saunders was born at Portland, Victoria on 21 May 1898.

He married Millicent May "Mollie" Allen (1900-1963), later Mrs. Walter William James Crawford, in 1922.

== Education ==
He attended Christian Brothers' College, East Melbourne.

== Football ==
=== Collingwood (VFL) ===
Saunders was recruited locally to Collingwood and went on to play 11 seasons with the club as a defender, mostly at full-back. He was a member of Collingwood premiership teams in 1917 and 1919 as well as playing in three losing Grand Finals. Saunders also represented the VFL at interstate football on three occasions.

==== 1922 ====
In 1922, following a game where he had knocked out Carlton's Alex Duncan, the VFL Tribunal suspended him for six matches. He was also charged by the police, found guilty in court, and fined £5, in default a month's imprisonment.

==== 1926 ====
After playing the opening two rounds of the 1926 season Saunders retired from playing.

=== Footscray (VFL) ===
He was cleared to Footscray in mid-season 1926, and coached them, as non-playing coach, in 10 games for three wins. South Melbourne's Paddy Scanlan was appointed as Footscray's captain-coach at the beginning of the 1927 season.

== Death ==
Saunders died on 9 December 1930 following an operation for pancreatitis, aged 32.
