= 1924 Hobart Carnival =

Tournament information
- Sport: Australian football
- Location: Hobart, Australia
- Dates: 6 August 1924–15 August 1924
- Format: Round Robin
- Teams: 6

Final champion
- Victoria

The 1924 Hobart Carnival was the fifth Australian National Football Carnival, an Australian football interstate competition. It was held from 6–15 August and was the first carnival to be hosted by the Tasmanian city of Hobart. It was won by Victoria.

After only three states had contested the 1921 Perth Carnival due to high travelling expenses, the 1924 Carnival was contested by all six states. The carnival was staged as a full round-robin amongst the states. All fifteen matches were played at North Hobart Oval.

Since the weaker footballing states of Queensland and New South Wales were grouped together with the likes of Victoria, there were many one sided games. Queensland in particular was uncompetitive against the main states. Western Australia managed to kick a senior record 43 goals in one match against the Queenslanders, 23 of which were kicked by full-forward Bonny Campbell – also a senior record. Victoria's game against Queensland was described in the Tasmanian press as "one of the most farcial football matches ever witnessed in Hobart", with Victoria applying little defensive pressure (resulting in Queensland's highest score of the tournament), and making positional changes which resulted in all eighteen Victorian players scoring at least one goal.

The best regarded match of the tournament, and ultimately the Championship-deciding match, was played on the first Saturday of the carnival between Victoria and Western Australia. Campbell (Western Australia) and Lloyd Hagger (Victoria) both scored seven goals. The Victorians won the encounter by eight points.

The carnival was the biggest sporting event to have been held in Tasmania's history at that time. Huge crowds were drawn to the marquee days of the carnival, attracting visitors from all over Tasmania. The crowd of 15,687 which attended the first Saturday set a new record as the highest sporting crowd in the history of Tasmania, and the second Saturday drew more than 12,000. A gazetted half-holiday was observed on the opening Wednesday, and businesses also closed on the second Wednesday, resulting in crowds of around 10,000 on both days. Overall, the carnival drew 60,706 paying spectators across nine days, and took a carnival record £5823/1/– at the gate. The average tournament crowd was reduced by the Tuesday and Thursday matches played during the second week – which featured predictably one-sided affairs, did not feature Tasmania, and one of which was played in heavy rain – which each drew only a couple of hundred of spectators.

As occurred at many carnivals, overuse of the ground and untimely heavy rain resulted in the condition of the playing surface degenerating to a bog by the end of the carnival.

== Results ==
	1924 Hobart Carnival
Wednesday, 6 August (12:30pm)	New South Wales 16.22 (118)	def.	Queensland 6.3 (39)	North Hobart Oval (crowd: 10,929 (C-R))
Wednesday, 6 August (3:00pm)	Western Australia 16.11 (107)	def.	South Australia 10.12 (72)	North Hobart Oval (crowd: 10,929)
Thursday, 7 August (3:00pm)	Victoria 13.16 (94)	def.	Tasmania 7.13 (55)	North Hobart Oval (crowd: 8,000)
Friday, 8 August (3:00pm)	South Australia 37.46 (268)	def.	Queensland 4.2 (26)	North Hobart Oval (crowd: 861)
Saturday, 9 August (12:45pm)	Tasmania 22.12 (144)	def.	New South Wales 10.13 (73)	North Hobart Oval (crowd: 15,687 (C-R))
Saturday, 9 August (3:00pm)	Victoria 15.13 (103)	def.	Western Australia 14.11 (95)	North Hobart Oval (crowd: 15,687)
Monday, 11 August (12:45pm)	Tasmania 33.25 (223)	def.	Queensland 3.7 (25)	North Hobart Oval (crowd: 1,717 (C-R))
Monday, 11 August (3:00pm)	South Australia 18.15 (123)	def.	New South Wales 9.12 (66)	North Hobart Oval (crowd: 1,717)
Tuesday, 12 August (12:45pm)	Western Australia 43.19 (277)	def.	Queensland 2.1 (13)	North Hobart Oval (crowd: 350 (C-R))
Tuesday, 12 August (3:00pm)	Victoria 14.26 (110)	def.	New South Wales 4.6 (30)	North Hobart Oval (crowd: 350)
Wednesday, 13 August (3:00pm)	South Australia 11.10 (76)	def.	Tasmania 3.10 (28)	North Hobart Oval (crowd: 9,889)
Thursday, 13 August (12:45pm)	Victoria 31.23 (209)	def.	Queensland 17.12 (114)	North Hobart Oval (crowd: 447 C-R)
Thursday, 13 August (3:00pm)	Western Australia 37.21 (241)	def.	New South Wales 9.12 (66)	North Hobart Oval (crowd: 447)
Saturday, 15 August (12:45pm)	Western Australia 13.5 (83)	def.	Tasmania 5.14 (44)	North Hobart Oval (crowd: 12,876 C-R)
Saturday, 15 August (3:00pm)	Victoria 17.16 (118)	def.	South Australia 9.11 (65)	North Hobart Oval (crowd: 12,876)

=== Ladder ===
1924 Hobart Carnival ladder
Pos	Team	Pld	W	L	D	PF	PA	Pts
1	Victoria	5	5	0	0	634	390	20
2	Western Australia	5	4	1	0	747	295	16
3	South Australia	5	3	2	0	604	340	12
4	Tasmania	5	2	3	0	487	351	8
5	New South Wales	5	1	4	0	345	509	4
6	Queensland	5	0	5	0	217	1079	0

== Goalkickers ==
Ranking	Player	Goals	Team
1	Bonny Campbell	51	Western Australia
2	Lloyd Hagger	25	Victoria
3	C. 'Chilla' Scott	20	Tasmania
4	Roy Bent	17	South Australia
5	Alfred Ryan	16	South Australia

== Squads ==
=== Victoria ===
Victoria Carnival Squad
Paddy O'Brien (Captain) | Albert Chadwick (Vice-Captain) | Maurie Beasy | Ray Brew | Roy Cazaly | Norm Cockram | Goldie Collins | Alex Duncan | Ern Elliott | Tom Fitzmaurice | Carji Greeves | Lloyd Hagger | Norm McIntosh | Jack Moriarty | Jack O'Connell | Arthur Pink | Bill Shelton | Mark Tandy | Dick Taylor | Vic Thorp | Colin Watson | Len Wigraft | Ernie Wilson

=== New South Wales ===
New South Wales Carnival Squad
R. Ellis (Captain)
