= Jim Shelton (footballer) =

Australian rules footballer (1897–1970)

Personal information
- Full name: James Patrick Shelton
- Born: 13 March 1897; Koo Wee Rup
- Died: 15 July 1970 (aged 73)
- Height: 185 cm (6 ft 1 in)
- Weight: 82 kg (181 lb)

Playing career^{1}
Years	Club	Games (Goals)
1920–21	St Kilda	3 (0)
- ^{1} Playing statistics correct to the end of 1921.

James Patrick Shelton (13 March 1897 – 15 July 1970) was an Australian rules footballer who played with St Kilda in the Victorian Football League (VFL).

Shelton's son John Shelton played VFL football for Fitzroy.

== Sources ==
- Hillier, K. (2004) Like Father Like Son, Pennon Publishing: Melbourne. ISBN 1-877029-73-4.
