= Syd Coventry Jr. =

Australian rules footballer

Syd Coventry

Personal information
- Full name: Syd Coventry Jr.
- Born: 14 March 1932 (age 94)
- Original team: Alphington
- Height: 185 cm (6 ft 1 in)
- Weight: 83 kg (183 lb)

Playing career^{1}
Years	Club	Games (Goals)
1954	Collingwood	7 (0)
- ^{1} Playing statistics correct to the end of 1954.

Syd Coventry Jr. (born 14 March 1932) is a former Australian rules footballer who played with Collingwood in the Victorian Football League (VFL).

Coventry was put on the Collingwood senior supplementary list in 1953 but was restricted to seconds fixtures. His father, Collingwood great Syd Coventry Sr., was club president during the years that his son was playing there.

A follower, he got his chance to play senior football in the 1954 VFL season when he replaced an injured Bill Rose in the side. He made a total of seven appearances that year and did not feature again.
