= Jack O'Connell (Australian footballer) =

Australian rules footballer (1902–1975)

Personal information
- Full name: John Keiron O'Connell
- Born: 16 July 1902; Winchelsea, Victoria
- Died: 20 May 1975 (aged 72); Box Hill, Victoria
- Height: 166 cm (5 ft 5 in)
- Weight: 60 kg (132 lb)

Playing career^{1}
Years	Club	Games (Goals)
1921	North Melbourne (VFA)	5 (0)
1921–1922	Williamstown (VFA)	17 (0)
1922–1924	South Melbourne (VFL)	42 (4)
- ^{1} Playing statistics correct to the end of 1924.

John Keiron O'Connell (16 July 1902 – 20 May 1975) was an Australian rules footballer who played with South Melbourne in the Victorian Football League (VFL).

== Family ==
The son of John Keiran O'Connell (1879-1927), and Margaret Anne Frances O'Connell (1880-1955), née Hannon, John Keiron O'Connell was born at Winchelsea, Victoria on 16 July 1902.

He married Elizabeth May Seymour (1902-1969) in 1923. They had two children.

== Athlete ==
O'Connell was a successful professional sprinter, winning the 130 yards "£100 Sheffield Handicap" (running off 11 yards, and winning by half a yard) at the Geelong Highland Games on 30 December 1923.

External images
- Jack O'Connell, South Melbourne (1924).
- Hamilton Football Team 1929 O'Connell (captain-coach) is seated, fourth player from right.
- Hamilton Football Team 1930 O'Connell is seated, second player from right.

== Football ==
A wingman able to kick with both feet.

Cleared by the VFA from North Melbourne to Williamstown in July 1921 (the North Melbourne club disbanded on 30 June 1921).

He played on the wing for Williamstown before moving to South Melbourne.

O'Connell coached Ararat in 1925.

== Death ==
He died at Box Hill, Victoria, as the result of an accident, on 20 May 1975.

== See also ==
- 1924 Hobart Carnival
