= 1929 VFL season =

33rd season of the Victorian Football League (VFL)

1929 VFL premiership season

Overview
- Date: 27 April – 28 September 1929
- Teams: 12
- Premiers: Collingwood; 8th premiership
- Runners-up: Richmond; 5th runners-up result
- Minor premiers: Collingwood; 11th minor premiership
- Brownlow Medallist: Albert Collier (Collingwood); 6 votes
- Leading goalkicker medallist: Gordon Coventry (Collingwood); 118 goals

Attendance
- Matches played: 112
- Total attendance: 1,911,541 (17,067 per match)
- Highest (H&A): 41,316 (round 18, Melbourne v Collingwood)
- Highest (finals): 63,336 (grand final, Collingwood v Richmond)

The 1929 VFL season was the 33rd season of the Victorian Football League (VFL), the highest-level senior Australian rules football competition in Victoria. The season featured twelve clubs and ran from 27 April to 28 September, comprising an 18-match home-and-away season followed by a four-week finals series featuring the top four clubs.

Collingwood won the premiership, defeating Richmond by 29 points in the 1929 VFL grand final; it was Collingwood's third consecutive premiership and eighth VFL premiership overall. Collingwood also won the minor premiership by finishing atop the home-and-away ladder with an 18–0 win–loss record, the only time in the league's history that a team has gone through a home-and-away season undefeated, however its loss to Richmond in the semi-finals prevented the club from achieving a perfect season. Collingwood's Albert Collier won the Brownlow Medal as the league's best and fairest player, and teammate Gordon Coventry won his fourth consecutive leading goalkicker medal as the league's leading goalkicker, becoming the first player to kick over 100 goals in a season.

== Background ==
In 1929, the VFL competition consisted of twelve teams of 18 on-the-field players each, with no "reserves", although any of the 18 players who had left the playing field for any reason could later resume their place on the field at any time during the match.

Teams played each other in a home-and-away season of 18 rounds; matches 12 to 18 were the "home-and-away reverse" of matches 1 to 7.

Once the 18 round home-and-away season had finished, the 1929 VFL Premiers were determined by the specific format and conventions of the amended "Argus system".

== Home-and-away season ==
=== Round 1 ===
Home team	Home team score	Away team	Away team score	Venue	Crowd	Date
Melbourne	12.8 (80)	South Melbourne	7.16 (58)	MCG	16,843	27 April 1929
Collingwood	15.2 (92)	Richmond	11.9 (75)	Victoria Park	25,000	27 April 1929
Carlton	19.17 (131)	Essendon	8.10 (58)	Princes Park	7,000	27 April 1929
St Kilda	12.10 (82)	Hawthorn	8.10 (58)	Junction Oval	13,000	27 April 1929
North Melbourne	8.6 (54)	Geelong	12.20 (92)	Arden Street Oval	7,000	27 April 1929
Footscray	10.18 (78)	Fitzroy	10.9 (69)	Western Oval	17,000	27 April 1929

=== Round 2 ===
Home team	Home team score	Away team	Away team score	Venue	Crowd	Date
Geelong	12.15 (87)	Melbourne	3.10 (28)	Corio Oval	11,000	4 May 1929
Fitzroy	14.23 (107)	North Melbourne	8.7 (55)	Brunswick Street Oval	13,000	4 May 1929
Essendon	17.10 (112)	Footscray	16.8 (104)	Windy Hill	20,000	4 May 1929
South Melbourne	12.17 (89)	St Kilda	9.9 (63)	Lake Oval	21,270	4 May 1929
Hawthorn	11.7 (73)	Collingwood	18.18 (126)	Glenferrie Oval	12,000	4 May 1929
Richmond	16.23 (119)	Carlton	16.13 (109)	Punt Road Oval	36,000	4 May 1929

=== Round 3 ===
Home team	Home team score	Away team	Away team score	Venue	Crowd	Date
Footscray	8.16 (64)	North Melbourne	7.11 (53)	Western Oval	15,000	11 May 1929
Essendon	9.9 (63)	Richmond	15.17 (107)	Windy Hill	25,000	11 May 1929
Collingwood	19.20 (134)	South Melbourne	4.14 (38)	Victoria Park	18,000	11 May 1929
Carlton	13.28 (106)	Hawthorn	9.14 (68)	Princes Park	17,000	11 May 1929
St Kilda	8.9 (57)	Geelong	8.12 (60)	Junction Oval	21,000	11 May 1929
Melbourne	15.17 (107)	Fitzroy	12.4 (76)	MCG	18,920	11 May 1929

=== Round 4 ===
Home team	Home team score	Away team	Away team score	Venue	Crowd	Date
Fitzroy	12.8 (80)	St Kilda	16.21 (117)	Brunswick Street Oval	14,000	18 May 1929
North Melbourne	6.5 (41)	Melbourne	14.15 (99)	Arden Street Oval	9,000	18 May 1929
Richmond	14.19 (103)	Footscray	11.19 (85)	Punt Road Oval	22,000	18 May 1929
Hawthorn	10.10 (70)	Essendon	10.15 (75)	Glenferrie Oval	12,000	18 May 1929
Geelong	6.13 (49)	Collingwood	12.13 (85)	Corio Oval	20,499	18 May 1929
South Melbourne	9.19 (73)	Carlton	10.19 (79)	Lake Oval	25,000	18 May 1929

=== Round 5 ===
Home team	Home team score	Away team	Away team score	Venue	Crowd	Date
Footscray	10.15 (75)	Melbourne	11.9 (75)	Western Oval	15,500	25 May 1929
Essendon	10.18 (78)	South Melbourne	7.10 (52)	Windy Hill	15,000	25 May 1929
Collingwood	16.19 (115)	Fitzroy	8.11 (59)	Victoria Park	18,000	25 May 1929
Carlton	10.13 (73)	Geelong	8.7 (55)	Princes Park	30,000	25 May 1929
St Kilda	18.13 (121)	North Melbourne	7.13 (55)	Junction Oval	15,000	25 May 1929
Richmond	16.22 (118)	Hawthorn	12.5 (77)	Punt Road Oval	14,000	25 May 1929

=== Round 6 ===
Home team	Home team score	Away team	Away team score	Venue	Crowd	Date
South Melbourne	11.14 (80)	Richmond	10.17 (77)	Lake Oval	24,000	1 June 1929
North Melbourne	11.15 (81)	Collingwood	20.12 (132)	Arden Street Oval	10,000	1 June 1929
Fitzroy	10.13 (73)	Carlton	20.12 (132)	Brunswick Street Oval	25,000	1 June 1929
Melbourne	8.13 (61)	St Kilda	8.11 (59)	MCG	38,104	3 June 1929
Footscray	16.24 (120)	Hawthorn	7.15 (57)	Western Oval	14,000	3 June 1929
Geelong	7.13 (55)	Essendon	8.12 (60)	Corio Oval	13,250	3 June 1929

=== Round 7 ===
Home team	Home team score	Away team	Away team score	Venue	Crowd	Date
Hawthorn	15.8 (98)	South Melbourne	11.13 (79)	Glenferrie Oval	10,000	15 June 1929
Essendon	18.25 (133)	Fitzroy	12.8 (80)	Windy Hill	15,000	15 June 1929
Collingwood	12.11 (83)	Melbourne	9.5 (59)	Victoria Park	22,000	15 June 1929
Carlton	15.17 (107)	North Melbourne	7.10 (52)	Princes Park	18,000	15 June 1929
Richmond	13.15 (93)	Geelong	12.13 (85)	Punt Road Oval	19,000	15 June 1929
St Kilda	13.14 (92)	Footscray	8.13 (61)	Junction Oval	20,000	15 June 1929

=== Round 8 ===
Home team	Home team score	Away team	Away team score	Venue	Crowd	Date
Geelong	8.8 (56)	Hawthorn	2.13 (25)	Corio Oval	4,000	22 June 1929
Footscray	11.9 (75)	South Melbourne	8.13 (61)	Western Oval	11,000	22 June 1929
Fitzroy	13.8 (86)	Richmond	19.13 (127)	Brunswick Street Oval	14,000	22 June 1929
North Melbourne	4.14 (38)	Essendon	10.12 (72)	Arden Street Oval	9,000	22 June 1929
St Kilda	7.8 (50)	Collingwood	7.12 (54)	Junction Oval	27,000	22 June 1929
Melbourne	5.12 (42)	Carlton	10.17 (77)	MCG	26,591	22 June 1929

=== Round 9 ===
Home team	Home team score	Away team	Away team score	Venue	Crowd	Date
Essendon	11.10 (76)	Melbourne	12.10 (82)	Windy Hill	15,000	29 June 1929
Collingwood	20.19 (139)	Footscray	14.10 (94)	Victoria Park	18,000	29 June 1929
Carlton	12.22 (94)	St Kilda	7.15 (57)	Princes Park	32,000	29 June 1929
Richmond	19.15 (129)	North Melbourne	11.10 (76)	Punt Road Oval	11,000	29 June 1929
South Melbourne	10.13 (73)	Geelong	10.15 (75)	Lake Oval	12,000	29 June 1929
Hawthorn	13.15 (93)	Fitzroy	8.10 (58)	Glenferrie Oval	10,000	29 June 1929

=== Round 10 ===
Home team	Home team score	Away team	Away team score	Venue	Crowd	Date
Melbourne	10.8 (68)	Richmond	9.11 (65)	MCG	18,048	6 July 1929
Footscray	9.13 (67)	Geelong	9.5 (59)	Western Oval	9,000	6 July 1929
Fitzroy	12.14 (86)	South Melbourne	17.8 (110)	Brunswick Street Oval	6,000	6 July 1929
North Melbourne	8.6 (54)	Hawthorn	8.18 (66)	Arden Street Oval	4,500	6 July 1929
St Kilda	9.9 (63)	Essendon	7.6 (48)	Junction Oval	12,500	6 July 1929
Collingwood	15.15 (105)	Carlton	11.10 (76)	Victoria Park	33,000	6 July 1929

=== Round 11 ===
Home team	Home team score	Away team	Away team score	Venue	Crowd	Date
Richmond	13.13 (91)	St Kilda	7.11 (53)	Punt Road Oval	20,000	13 July 1929
Hawthorn	5.13 (43)	Melbourne	7.11 (53)	Glenferrie Oval	8,000	13 July 1929
Carlton	15.20 (110)	Footscray	6.7 (43)	Princes Park	20,000	13 July 1929
South Melbourne	17.14 (116)	North Melbourne	12.9 (81)	Lake Oval	8,000	13 July 1929
Geelong	15.6 (96)	Fitzroy	10.11 (71)	Corio Oval	7,500	13 July 1929
Essendon	11.7 (73)	Collingwood	13.14 (92)	Windy Hill	17,000	13 July 1929

=== Round 12 ===
Home team	Home team score	Away team	Away team score	Venue	Crowd	Date
Hawthorn	7.9 (51)	St Kilda	15.12 (102)	Glenferrie Oval	12,000	20 July 1929
Geelong	11.14 (80)	North Melbourne	8.6 (54)	Corio Oval	7,000	20 July 1929
Fitzroy	9.15 (69)	Footscray	12.16 (88)	Brunswick Street Oval	10,000	20 July 1929
South Melbourne	12.10 (82)	Melbourne	9.15 (69)	Lake Oval	15,000	20 July 1929
Richmond	11.9 (75)	Collingwood	16.21 (117)	Punt Road Oval	33,000	20 July 1929
Essendon	8.7 (55)	Carlton	7.17 (59)	Windy Hill	22,000	20 July 1929

=== Round 13 ===
Home team	Home team score	Away team	Away team score	Venue	Crowd	Date
St Kilda	15.9 (99)	South Melbourne	8.8 (56)	Junction Oval	18,500	27 July 1929
Collingwood	22.10 (142)	Hawthorn	7.14 (56)	Victoria Park	7,000	27 July 1929
Carlton	8.9 (57)	Richmond	13.15 (93)	Princes Park	27,000	27 July 1929
Melbourne	6.14 (50)	Geelong	6.12 (48)	MCG	12,834	27 July 1929
North Melbourne	12.13 (85)	Fitzroy	15.12 (102)	Arden Street Oval	5,000	27 July 1929
Footscray	11.11 (77)	Essendon	10.18 (78)	Western Oval	14,000	27 July 1929

=== Round 14 ===
Home team	Home team score	Away team	Away team score	Venue	Crowd	Date
Geelong	9.6 (60)	St Kilda	11.5 (71)	Corio Oval	10,500	3 August 1929
Fitzroy	5.11 (41)	Melbourne	11.11 (77)	Brunswick Street Oval	8,000	3 August 1929
North Melbourne	9.8 (62)	Footscray	7.7 (49)	Arden Street Oval	7,000	3 August 1929
Richmond	10.14 (74)	Essendon	10.14 (74)	Punt Road Oval	22,000	3 August 1929
South Melbourne	6.7 (43)	Collingwood	10.10 (70)	Lake Oval	20,000	3 August 1929
Hawthorn	5.7 (37)	Carlton	7.8 (50)	Glenferrie Oval	6,000	3 August 1929

=== Round 15 ===
Home team	Home team score	Away team	Away team score	Venue	Crowd	Date
Melbourne	15.17 (107)	North Melbourne	6.14 (50)	MCG	8,421	10 August 1929
Footscray	11.6 (72)	Richmond	14.15 (99)	Western Oval	13,000	10 August 1929
Essendon	15.10 (100)	Hawthorn	13.14 (92)	Windy Hill	11,000	10 August 1929
Collingwood	13.9 (87)	Geelong	8.12 (60)	Victoria Park	14,000	10 August 1929
Carlton	17.17 (119)	South Melbourne	11.15 (81)	Princes Park	20,000	10 August 1929
St Kilda	21.16 (142)	Fitzroy	10.15 (75)	Junction Oval	14,500	10 August 1929

=== Round 16 ===
Home team	Home team score	Away team	Away team score	Venue	Crowd	Date
North Melbourne	9.8 (62)	St Kilda	20.12 (132)	Arden Street Oval	9,000	17 August 1929
Hawthorn	8.10 (58)	Richmond	11.14 (80)	Glenferrie Oval	12,500	17 August 1929
Melbourne	11.16 (82)	Footscray	6.5 (41)	MCG	13,891	17 August 1929
South Melbourne	14.10 (94)	Essendon	13.10 (88)	Lake Oval	15,000	17 August 1929
Fitzroy	8.7 (55)	Collingwood	16.15 (111)	Brunswick Street Oval	13,000	17 August 1929
Geelong	2.13 (25)	Carlton	5.9 (39)	Corio Oval	10,000	17 August 1929

=== Round 17 ===
Home team	Home team score	Away team	Away team score	Venue	Crowd	Date
Richmond	18.28 (136)	South Melbourne	10.5 (65)	Punt Road Oval	12,000	24 August 1929
Essendon	7.11 (53)	Geelong	6.15 (51)	Windy Hill	9,000	24 August 1929
Collingwood	21.12 (138)	North Melbourne	8.13 (61)	Victoria Park	6,000	24 August 1929
Carlton	15.18 (108)	Fitzroy	9.15 (69)	Princes Park	13,000	24 August 1929
St Kilda	9.12 (66)	Melbourne	6.13 (49)	Junction Oval	35,000	24 August 1929
Hawthorn	10.17 (77)	Footscray	5.3 (33)	Glenferrie Oval	4,000	24 August 1929

=== Round 18 ===
Home team	Home team score	Away team	Away team score	Venue	Crowd	Date
Geelong	12.10 (82)	Richmond	5.12 (42)	Corio Oval	6,500	31 August 1929
Footscray	4.18 (42)	St Kilda	9.13 (67)	Western Oval	10,000	31 August 1929
South Melbourne	13.10 (88)	Hawthorn	11.5 (71)	Lake Oval	8,000	31 August 1929
Fitzroy	11.18 (84)	Essendon	7.11 (53)	Brunswick Street Oval	8,500	31 August 1929
Melbourne	5.10 (40)	Collingwood	14.12 (96)	MCG	41,316	31 August 1929
North Melbourne	8.8 (56)	Carlton	8.15 (63)	Arden Street Oval	8,000	31 August 1929

== Ladder ==
(P)	Premiers
	Qualified for finals

#	Team	P	W	L	D	PF	PA	%	Pts
1	Collingwood (P)	18	18	0	0	1918	1117	171.7	72
2	Carlton	18	15	3	0	1589	1161	136.9	60
3	Richmond	18	12	5	1	1703	1399	121.7	50
4	St Kilda	18	12	6	0	1493	1146	130.3	48
5	Melbourne	18	11	6	1	1228	1164	105.5	46
6	Essendon	18	9	8	1	1349	1405	96.0	38
7	Geelong	18	8	10	0	1175	1082	108.6	32
8	South Melbourne	18	7	11	0	1338	1578	84.8	28
9	Footscray	18	6	11	1	1268	1464	86.6	26
10	Hawthorn	18	4	14	0	1170	1522	76.9	16
11	Fitzroy	18	3	15	0	1340	1827	73.3	12
12	North Melbourne	18	1	17	0	1070	1776	60.2	4

Rules for classification: 1. premiership points; 2. percentage; 3. points for
Average score: 77.0
Source: AFL Tables

== Finals series ==
All of the 1929 finals were played at the MCG so the home team in the semi-finals and Preliminary Final is purely the higher ranked team from the ladder but in the Grand Final the home team was the team that won the Preliminary Final.

=== Semi-finals ===
Home team	Score	Away team	Score	Venue	Crowd	Date
Carlton	12.9 (81)	St Kilda	11.7 (73)	MCG	58,481	7 September
Collingwood	8.13 (61)	Richmond	18.15 (123)	MCG	51,069	14 September

=== Preliminary final ===
Home team	Score	Away team	Score	Venue	Crowd	Date
Richmond	15.7 (97)	Carlton	14.7 (91)	MCG	60,653	21 September

== Season notes ==
- Collingwood set many records during the 1929 season, including:
  - First team to remain undefeated through an entire home-and away season. However, given that they lost the second semi-final to Richmond, they were not undefeated for the entire season.
  - In three seasons, 1927, 1928, and 1929, the team had played 61 matches, for 53 wins, 1 draw, and 7 losses.
  - First team to score more than 2,000 points in a single season.
  - First team to have a full-forward scoring more than 100 goals in a single season.
  - First team to have a player kick 16 goals in a single match.
  - First team to be VFL premiers on eight occasions.
- On 18 June 1929 the VFL was incorporated as a public company, and it purchased a three-storey building (later named Harrison House after Henry Harrison who died later that year, on 2 September) on the corner of Spring Street and Flinders Lane.
- Clarrie Hearn of Essendon won the 1929 130-yard Stawell Gift in eleven and fifteen sixteenths of a second (approx. 11.94 seconds), off a handicap of 10 yards.
- Footscray's 23 effective scoring shots (7 goals and 16 behinds) against Hawthorn in the third quarter of their Round 6 match remains the most scoring shots by a team in one quarter.
  - Footscray's 16 behinds in that quarter has been equalled only by Collingwood against North Melbourne in the third quarter in Round 6, 1970.

== Awards ==
- The 1929 VFL Premiership team was Collingwood.
- The VFL's leading goalkicker was Gordon Coventry of Collingwood with 124 goals.
- The winner of the 1929 Brownlow Medal was Albert "Leeter" Collier of Collingwood with 6 votes.
- North Melbourne took the "wooden spoon" in 1929.
- The seconds premiership was won by Richmond. Richmond 12.8 (80) defeated Geelong 7.15 (57) in the challenge Grand Final, played as a stand-alone game on Thursday 26 September (Show Day holiday) at the Melbourne Cricket Ground before a crowd of 6,544.

== Sources ==
- 1929 VFL season at AFL Tables
- 1929 VFL season at Australian Football
