= Alan Rayson =

Australian rules footballer

Personal information
- Full name: Alan Arthur Rayson
- Born: 26 October 1924; Geelong, Victoria
- Died: 25 February 1982 (aged 57); Geelong, Victoria
- Original team: East Geelong
- Height: 175 cm (5 ft 9 in)
- Weight: 67 kg (148 lb)

Playing career^{1}
Years	Club	Games (Goals)
1943	Carlton	2 (2)
1946–1947	Geelong	18 (15)
Total		20 (17)
- ^{1} Playing statistics correct to the end of 1947.

Alan Arthur Rayson (26 October 1924 – 25 February 1982) was an Australian rules footballer who played for the Carlton Football Club and Geelong Football Club in the Victorian Football League (VFL).

Rayson's football career was interrupted by his service in the Royal Australian Air Force during World War II.
