= John Shelton (Australian rules footballer) =

Australian rules footballer (born 1933)

Personal information
- Full name: John Shelton
- Born: 23 December 1933
- Original team: Koo-wee-rup
- Height: 183 cm (6 ft 0 in)
- Weight: 76 kg (168 lb)

Playing career^{1}
| Years | Club | Games (Goals) |
| 1957 | Fitzroy | 6 (3) |
- ^{1} Playing statistics correct to the end of 1957.

John Shelton (born 23 December 1933) is a former Australian rules footballer who played with Fitzroy in the Victorian Football League (VFL).
