= Jack Haskett =

Australian rules footballer, born 1911

Personal information
- Full name: Jack Haskett
- Born: 25 June 1911
- Died: 5 March 1992 (aged 80)
- Height: 180 cm (5 ft 11 in)
- Weight: 78 kg (172 lb)

Playing career^{1}
Years	Club	Games (Goals)
1933	North Melbourne	3 (0)
- ^{1} Playing statistics correct to the end of 1933.

Jack Haskett (25 June 1911 – 5 March 1992) was an Australian rules footballer who played with North Melbourne in the Victorian Football League (VFL).
