= Jack Plunkett =

Australian rules footballer (1911–1985)

Personal information
- Full name: John Plunkett
- Born: 5 January 1911; Geelong, Victoria
- Died: 16 December 1985 (aged 74); Norlane, Victoria
- Height: 170 cm (5 ft 7 in)
- Weight: 67 kg (148 lb)

Playing career^{1}
Years	Club	Games (Goals)
1928–1930	Geelong	26 (58)
- ^{1} Playing statistics correct to the end of 1930.

Jack Plunkett (5 January 1911 – 16 December 1985) was an Australian rules footballer who played with Geelong in the Victorian Football League (VFL).

Plunkett was just 17 when he debuted in the 1928 VFL season. He was Geelong's leading goal-kicker in 1929, with 29 goals, six of which game in a win over Fitzroy.

Plunkett later served in the Australian Army during World War II.
