= Stan Hepburn =

Australian rules footballer, born 1904

Personal information
- Full name: Stan Hepburn
- Born: 20 July 1904
- Died: 29 October 1964 (aged 60)
- Height: 175 cm (5 ft 9 in)
- Weight: 77 kg (170 lb)
- Position: Back Pocket

Playing career^{1}
Years	Club	Games (Goals)
1925–30	St Kilda	69 (14)
- ^{1} Playing statistics correct to the end of 1930.

Stan Hepburn (20 July 1904 – 29 October 1964) was a former Australian rules footballer who played with St Kilda in the Victorian Football League (VFL).
