= Paddy Scanlan (footballer) =

Australian rules footballer and coach (1896–1977)

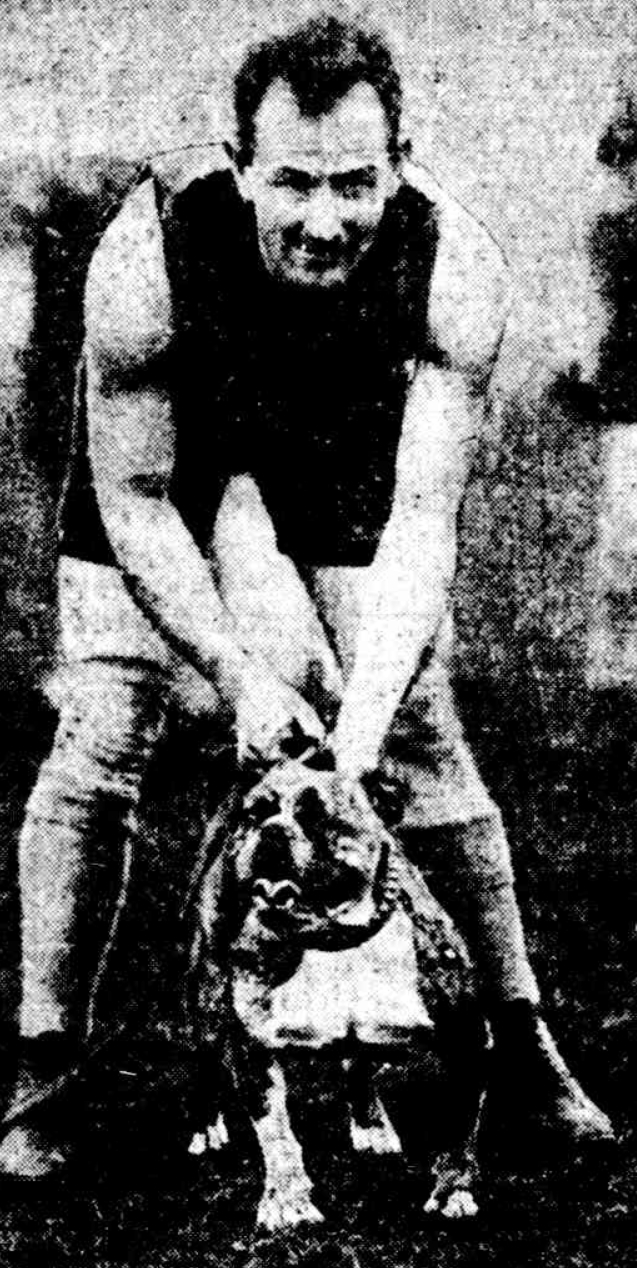

Personal information
- Full name: Patrick James Scanlan
- Born: 6 September 1896; Albert Park, Victoria
- Died: 1 January 1977 (aged 80); Middle Park, Victoria
- Original team: Leopold (MAFA)
- Height: 173 cm (5 ft 8 in)
- Weight: 69 kg (152 lb)

Playing career^{1}
Years	Club	Games (Goals)
1920–1926	South Melbourne	100 (49)
1927–1928	Footscray	33 (15)
Total		133 (64)

Coaching career
Years	Club	Games (W–L–D)
1927–1928	Footscray	36 (15–21–0)
1930–1931	South Melbourne	36 (18–18–0)
1935–1937	North Melbourne	54 (8–46–0)
Total		126 (41–85–0)
- ^{1} Playing statistics correct to the end of 1937.

Patrick James Scanlan (6 September 1896 – 1 January 1977) was an Australian rules footballer who played with and coached South Melbourne and Footscray in the Victorian Football League (VFL).

Scanlan made his league debut in 1920 for South Melbourne and went on to play exactly 100 games for the club, captaining them from 1923 to 1926.

In 1927, he moved to Footscray and was appointed captain-coach.

He retired as a player after the 1928 season and went to Richmond to coach the seconds; the team won the premiership and he then returned South Melbourne as coach of the seniors for two seasons. Later on in the decade he would also coach North Melbourne but couldn't prevent them from finishing with two wooden spoons.
