= Jack Chambers (footballer) =

Australian rules footballer (1901–1983)

Personal information
- Full name: John Moffatt Chambers
- Born: 6 December 1901; Broadmeadows, Victoria
- Died: 1 July 1983 (aged 81); Parkdale, Victoria
- Original team: Essendon
- Height: 185 cm (6 ft 1 in)
- Weight: 83 kg (183 lb)

Playing career^{1}
Years	Club	Games (Goals)
1924–1928	Geelong	72 (59)
- ^{1} Playing statistics correct to the end of 1928.

John Moffatt Chambers (6 December 1901 – 1 July 1983) was an Australian rules footballer who played with Geelong in the Victorian Football League (VFL). He was inducted into the Geelong Hall of Fame in 2011.

A strong marking ruckman, Chambers was cleared to Geelong in 1924, having been on Essendon's list.

Chambers was a half forward flanker in the Geelong team which won the 1925 VFL Grand Final, their first ever premiership.

In 1926 Chambers represented Victoria in an interstate match against Western Australia in Perth.

Chambers kicked a career best 28 goals in 1928, from 18 games, to finish as Geelong's leading goal-kicker.

Chambers had a son, John Chambers, who played Sheffield Shield cricket for Victoria as a batsman.
