= Arthur Stevens (Australian footballer) =

Australian rules footballer (1899–1953)

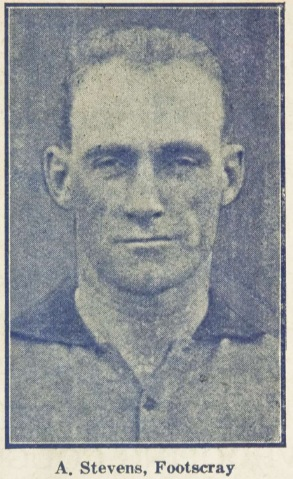

Personal information
- Full name: Arthur Greaves Stevens
- Born: 27 June 1899; West Melbourne, Victoria
- Died: 7 July 1953 (aged 54); Reservoir, Victoria
- Original team: Preston (VFA)
- Height: 188 cm (6 ft 2 in)
- Weight: 93 kg (205 lb)

Playing career^{1}
Years	Club	Games (Goals)
1927–1932	Footscray	64 (23)
- ^{1} Playing statistics correct to the end of 1932.

Career highlights
- Victorian representative: 1928; Footscray club captain: 1929

Arthur Greaves Stevens (27 June 1899 – 7 July 1953) was an Australian rules footballer who played with Footscray in the Victorian Football League (VFL). He was often referred to as "Chidda" or "Chidder" Stevens.

== Career ==
Stevens arrived at Footscray in 1927, from Victorian Football Association club Preston. He was already aged 28 when he made his debut against St Kilda at Western Oval in round 10. A ruckman, Stevens immediately cemented his spot in the team and in 1928 was picked in the Victorian state side to play South Australia in Adelaide. He made 16 league appearances in the 1928 season and another 16 in 1929. When Footscray captain Allan Hopkins became unavailable in 1929, Stevens filled in as club captain.

On 17 August 1929, Footscray played a round 16 fixture against Melbourne at the MCG, during which Stevens was involved in several on field incidents. As the players were leaving the field at half time, Stevens was struck in the face by a man from the crowd and hit "by a woman with her parasol", before being assisted to the rooms by police constables. The spectator that struck Stevens, Hector Michael Davis, was charged with assault and fined in court.

At the VFL Tribunal, Stevens was suspended for 10 league games, on three charges. He received four weeks for "kneeing" Melbourne player Col Deane, two for conducting himself in "an unseemly manner" (an objectionable gesture) and four for elbowing and attempting to strike Melbourne's George Cassidy.

Stevens made just five appearances in the 1930 VFL season. On his first game back from suspension, at Corio Oval in round 10, the umpire reported him for attempting to elbow Geelong player Jack Plunkett. Although cleared of the charge at the tribunal, he received a four-week ban for his actions after he had been approached by the umpire, when he threw the ball away.

In 1931 he played 11 games and was a member of a Footscray team that missed out on the finals only on percentage.

He featured in the opening eight rounds of the 1932 season, then found himself back at the tribunal, reported for striking Melbourne's Joe Kinnear with his elbow. For this he received an eight-week suspension. His next and ultimately final appearance for Footscray came in round 18, against North Melbourne. He retired at the end of the season.

== Death ==
Stevens died at the age of 54 on 7 July 1953, when he was struck by a train on the railway line at Reservoir, Melbourne.

Police said there were no suspicious circumstances around his death.

== Family ==
He had a son, Harvey, who played for Footscray and was a member of their historic 1954 premiership team.

Two great grandsons have also played in the league, Daniel Talia for Adelaide and Michael Talia for the Western Bulldogs and Sydney Swans.
