= Jack Vosti =

Australian rules footballer, born 1903

Personal information
- Full name: John Winfred Vosti
- Born: 25 April 1903
- Died: 10 September 1977 (aged 74)
- Original team: Brunswick (VFA)
- Height: 185 cm (6 ft 1 in)
- Weight: 76 kg (168 lb)

Playing career^{1}
Years	Club	Games (Goals)
1925–32	Essendon	99 (80)
1933–34	Footscray	26 (0)
1935	Essendon	2 (0)
Total		127 (80)
- ^{1} Playing statistics correct to the end of 1935.

John Winfred Vosti (25 April 1903 – 10 September 1977) was an Australian rules footballer who played for Essendon and Footscray in the Victorian Football League (VFL).

== Football ==
Vosti started his VFL career in 1925 with Essendon. He played forward and topped Essendon's goalkicking in 1927 after kicking 35 goals. The following season saw him move to fullback, a position at which he excelled. He finished 2nd in Essendon's 1929 best and fairest award. From 1927 until 1930 he was a regular at full back for Victoria at interstate football.

In 1933 Essendon released him due to doubts over his ability to play with a knee injury. He joined Footscray, but was after performing well in 1933, he was again affected by injury. In mid 1935 he transferred back to Essendon, but only managed two more VFL games before retiring. He then coached Pascoe Vale Football Club in the Essendon District Football League before rejoining Essendon as a selector in 1946.
