= Syd Coventry =

Australian rules footballer (1899–1976)

Personal information
- Full name: Sydney Alfred Coventry
- Born: 13 June 1899; Greensborough, Victoria
- Died: 10 November 1976 (aged 77); Fairfield, Victoria
- Original team: Diamond Creek Football Club
- Height: 182 cm (6 ft 0 in)
- Weight: 86 kg (190 lb)

Playing career^{1}
Years	Club	Games (Goals)
1922–1934	Collingwood	227 (62)

Representative team honours
Years	Team	Games (Goals)
1922–1934	Victoria	27

Coaching career^{3}
Years	Club	Games (W–L–D)
1935–1937	Footscray	36 (8–26–2)
- ^{1} Playing statistics correct to the end of 1934.^{3} Coaching statistics correct as of 1937.

Career highlights
- Collingwood premiership captain 1927, 1928, 1929, 1930; Minor premier 1925, 1926, 1927, 1928, 1929, 1930; Collingwood Team of the Century, captain; Brownlow Medal 1927; Collingwood captain 1927–1934; Copeland Trophy 1927, 1932; Australian Football Hall of Fame 1996; Sport Australia Hall of Fame Awards 2002 (1929 team); Victorian captain – 1927, 1930, 1933

Sydney Alfred Coventry (13 June 1899 – 10 November 1976) was an Australian rules football player, coach and administrator. He played for Collingwood in the Victorian Football League (VFL) and also coached Footscray in the VFL.

In 1969, the Collingwood Football Club named the newly built social club stand at Victoria Park the S. A. Coventry Pavilion. In 1992, the Melbourne Cricket Club named Gate 7 after Coventry (and his brother) as part of the Great Southern Stand development at the Melbourne Cricket Ground. In 1996, Coventry was inducted into the first batch of players and officials in the Australian Football Hall of Fame. In 2016, Coventry was named by Sam Walker of The Wall Street Journal as one of the 16 best captains in sport history.

== Early career ==
Coventry was originally from Diamond Creek in Victoria. He moved to Queenstown in Tasmania after World War I to work as a miner. Coventry first played for a Queenstown-based team in 1919, but was appointed captain of the miners team from Gormanston for the 1920 season. The team played in the Queenstown-based Lyell Miners Football Association. Gormanston was a small miners' town at the top of Mount Lyell. The footballers in the region are noted as some of the hardiest in Australia given the weather and playing conditions, which include the famous gravel oval at Queenstown.

While in Tasmania, VFL club St Kilda tried to recruit Coventry. Coventry initially agreed to sign with the Saints, but his brother Gordon—who had just played his first year with Collingwood—to join the Magpies instead. The VFL gave Syd the options of either playing for St Kilda or taking 12 months off football to then play with Collingwood and Syd chose the Collingwood option.

== Collingwood ==
In his first season at Collingwood, the 1922 VFL season, he played 18 games including that year's 1922 VFL Grand Final kicking two goals in the match.

Coventry played predominantly as a ruckman despite his short stature. He was captain of Collingwood from 1927 until his retirement from playing in 1934. He was the captain of Collingwood's four consecutive premierships from 1927 to 1930. Coventry was one of Collingwood's best players in the 1927 Grand Final.

Coventry won the Brownlow Medal as the best and fairest player in the league in 1927. As of 2023, he is the only premiership captain to win the Brownlow in the same season. He also won Collingwood's best and fairest, the Copeland Trophy, in 1927 and 1932.

As captain, Coventry led Collingwood in 149 games. In that period, Collingwood won 115 games, drew twice and lost 32 times. Additionally, the team had a winning ratio of 77 percent, a VFL/AFL record for many years, but it has since beaten by Tom Harley, who had a 49–7 win–loss record as captain of Geelong in 2007–2009, a winning ratio of 87.5 percent.

Coventry represented Victorian 27 times in interstate matches from 1922 to 1934.

== Footscray ==
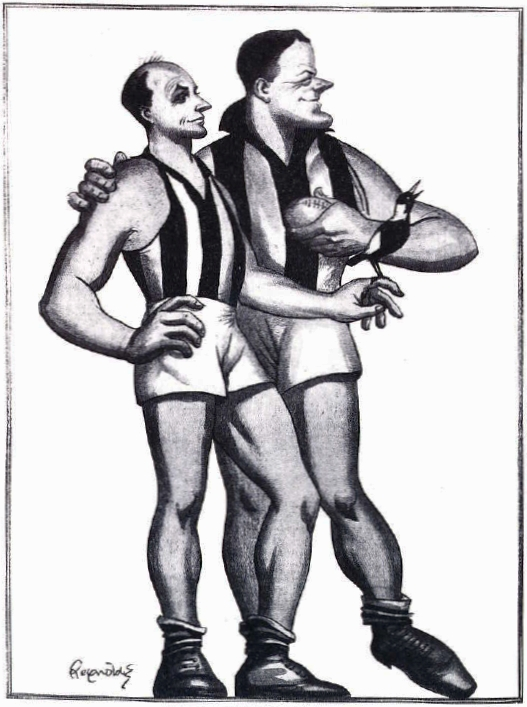
"The Coventrys of Collingwood" (L: Sid; R: Gordon) Len Reynolds, Table Talk, 9 October 1930.

Coventry left Collingwood in 1935 to coach Footscray. He spent two unsuccessful seasons with the Bulldogs before returning to Collingwood as a committee member.

== Family ==
He married Gladys Eileen Trevaskis (1901–1977) on 8 October 1921. Two of Syd's sons played for Collingwood: Hugh Coventry played for a year before enlisting in the RAAF and was awarded with a Distinguished Flying Cross; another son, Syd Coventry, Jr., also played for the club.

== Administrator ==
Coventry was Collingwood vice president from 1939 to 1949. He was then appointed president of the club in 1950, a role in which he served until 1962. From 1963 until 1976 he was Collingwood's patron.

== See also ==
- 1927 Melbourne Carnival
- 1930 Adelaide Carnival
- 1933 Sydney Carnival
