= Hugh Dunbar =

Australian rules footballer, born 1903

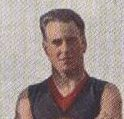

Personal information
- Full name: Hugh Ormond Dunbar
- Born: 27 June 1903; Traralgon, Victoria
- Died: 17 July 1985 (aged 82); Caulfield South, Victoria
- Original team: Carlsruhe
- Height: 185 cm (6 ft 1 in)
- Weight: 92 kg (203 lb)

Playing career^{1}
Years	Club	Games (Goals)
1922–1928	Melbourne	97 (48)
1930	St Kilda	3 (1)
Total		100 (49)
- ^{1} Playing statistics correct to the end of 1930.

Hugh Ormond Dunbar (27 June 1903 – 17 July 1985) was an Australian rules footballer who played with Melbourne and St Kilda in the Victorian Football League (VFL).

Dunbar, recruited from Carlsruhe, was a ruckman, but played at centre-half back for Melbourne in their 1926 premiership team. He represented Victoria in 1923, 1924 and 1926. His brothers, Edgar and Harold, also played for Melbourne.

Dunbar went to Victorian Football Association (VFA) club Brighton as playing coach in 1929 then played briefly for St Kilda in 1930, before going to the Ormond Amateurs as coach.
