= Barney Carr =

Australian rules footballer

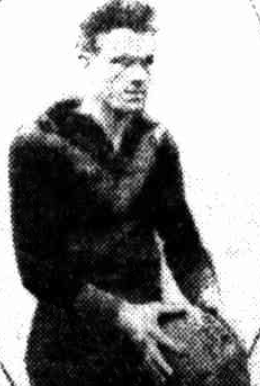

Personal information
- Full name: Charles Oliver Carr
- Born: 27 August 1897; Port Melbourne, Victoria
- Died: 19 January 1971 (aged 73); Parkville, Victoria
- Original team: Prahran (VFA)
- Height: 175 cm (5 ft 9 in)
- Weight: 75 kg (165 lb)

Playing career^{1}
Years	Club	Games (Goals)
1921–1929	St Kilda	130 (5)
- ^{1} Playing statistics correct to the end of 1929.

Charles Oliver "Barney" Carr (27 August 1897 – 19 January 1971) was an Australian rules footballer who played with St Kilda in the Victorian Football League during the 1920s.

A centreman, Carr played 130 games with St Kilda and represented Victoria at interstate football on nine occasions. He won St Kilda's best and fairest in 1922 and was club captain during the latter part of the 1925 season.
