= Herbert White (footballer) =

Australian rules footballer, born 1907

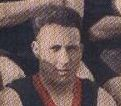

Personal information
- Full name: Herbert James White
- Born: 6 June 1907; Preston, Victoria
- Died: 8 April 1944 (aged 36); Prahran, Victoria
- Original team: Northcote (VFA)
- Height: 168 cm (5 ft 6 in)
- Weight: 70 kg (154 lb)

Playing career^{1}
Years	Club	Games (Goals)
1926–1929	Melbourne	67 (27)
- ^{1} Playing statistics correct to the end of 1929.

Career highlights
- Melbourne premiership player 1926

Herbert James White (6 June 1907 – 8 April 1944) was an Australian rules football player at the Melbourne Football Club in the Victorian Football League (VFL).

== Football ==
In 1926, he became one of the club's premiership players, under the auspices of captain-coach Albert Chadwick.

White made his debut against St Kilda in Round 1 of the 1926 VFL season, at the Melbourne Cricket Ground.

He has been given the Melbourne Heritage Number of 439, based on the order of his debut for the club.

== See also ==
- 1927 Melbourne Carnival
