= Albert Collier =

Australian rules footballer, born 1909

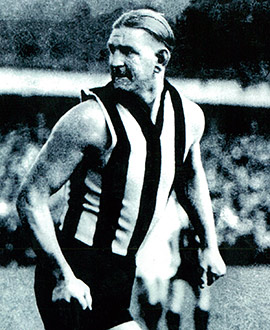
- Collier during his Collingwood career

Personal information
- Full name: Albert Collier
- Born: 9 July 1909; Collingwood, Victoria, Australia
- Died: 22 February 1988 (aged 78); Seaford, Victoria, Australia
- Original team: Ivanhoe
- Height: 180 cm (5 ft 11 in)
- Weight: 85 kg (187 lb)

Playing career^{1}
Years	Club	Games (Goals)
1925–30; 1933–39	Collingwood	205 (54)
1931–32	Cananore (TFL)	
1941–42	Fitzroy	12 (12)
1945–46	Camberwell (VFA)	
Total		217 (66)
- ^{1} Playing statistics correct to the end of 1946.

Career highlights
- Brownlow Medal 1929; William Leitch Medal 1931; Collingwood Best & Fairest (1929, 1934, 1935); 6 x VFL Premiership (1927, 1928, 1929, 1930, 1935, 1936); Collingwood Team of the Century; Victorian representative (14 games, 1 goal); Tasmanian Representative (1)

Albert Collier, also known as Leeter Collier (9 July 1909 – 22 February 1988), was an Australian rules footballer in the (then) Victorian Football League.

== Personal life ==
Albert Collier was born on 9 July 1909 in Collingwood, the seventh of the ten children of Albert Augustus Collier, signwriter, and his wife Hannah Josephine, née Binks, Albert grew up living opposite Victoria Park, the home ground of the Collingwood Football Club and was educated at the nearby Victoria Park State School.

He later married Mavis Thelma Leibie, and they had two sons.

Albert Collier died in 1988 at his home in Seaford.

== Playing career ==
In 1924, both Albert and his brother Harry played for the Melbourne district club Ivanhoe, and their strong performances led to the brothers being invited to try out for Collingwood. Albert Collier made his Collingwood debut in 1925 and soon established himself in the team. He initially played forward, but after a couple of seasons became a powerful centre half-back, and he was a vital part of 'The Machine', the 1927–1930 Collingwood teams who won four premierships in a row. This feat has not been repeated to date.

In 1931, at the height of the Great Depression, Collier left Collingwood as player/coach Cananore Football Club in Tasmania, winning the Tasmanian Southern League and Tasmanian State premiership and the William Leitch Medal. He went on to captain Tasmania in the State Carnival.

In 1933, Collier returned to Collingwood, and from 1935 to 1939 served as vice-captain with his brother Harry as captain. In each of those years, the Magpies contested the grand final, winning two further premierships (1935 and 1936). They are the only brothers in Australian Rules history to Captain and Vice Captain in a Premiership team 1935–36. Albert and his brother Harry both won a Brownlow medals and played together in 6 VFL Premierships.

Before the 1940 season the Collingwood committee forced the Collier brothers into a reluctant retirement, and Albert transferred to Fitzroy, where he played in 1941 and 1942.

Collier later captain-coached Camberwell in the throw-pass era VFA from 1945 until 1946, earning acclaim for building and leading the team to the minor premiership and a losing Grand Final in 1946.

He later coached country teams at Kyneton and at Sea Lake.

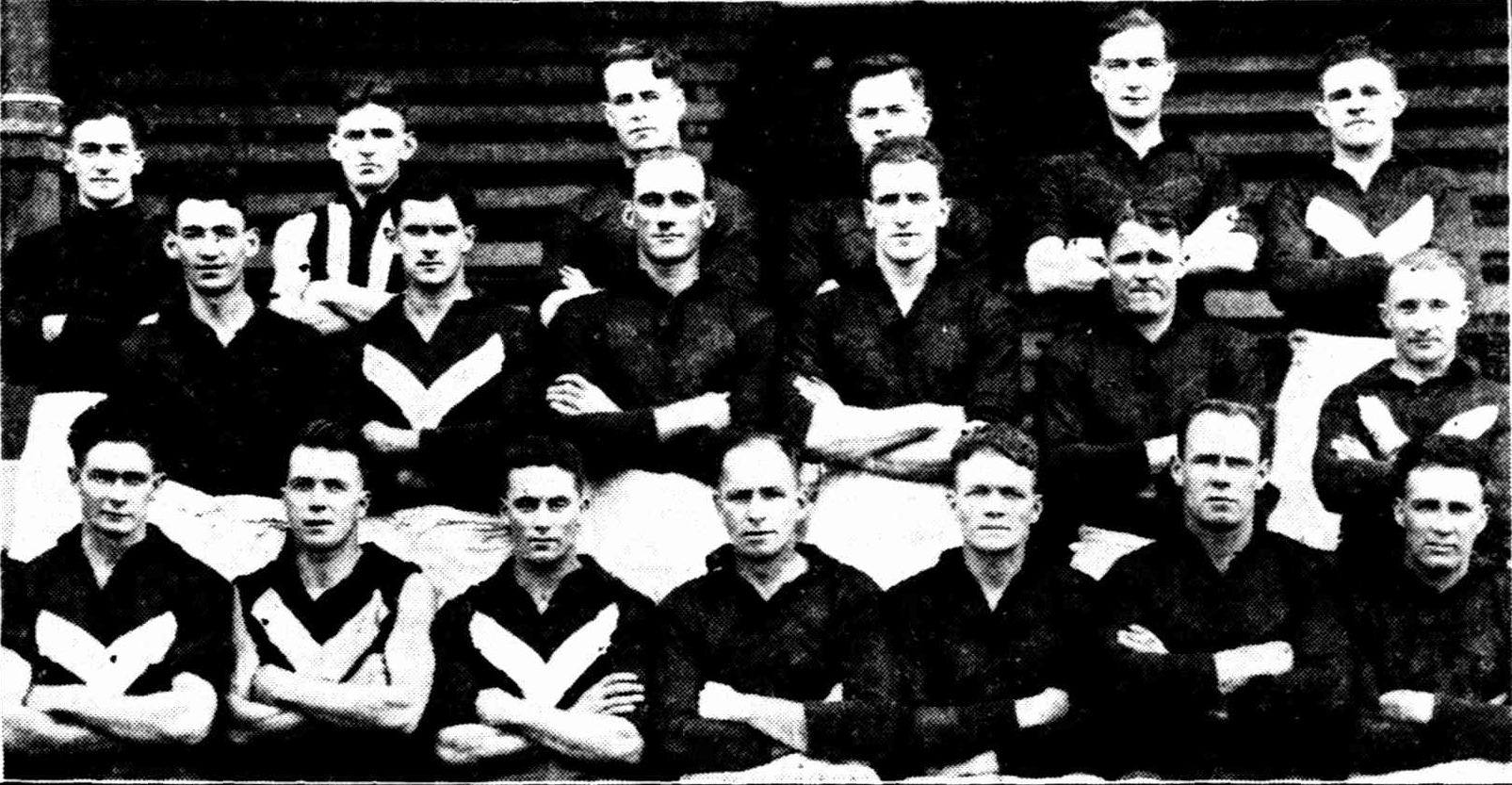
The Victorian Football League’s Interstate team that drew with South Australia, in Adelaide, 13.10 (88) to 11.22 (88) on Saturday, 16 June 1928. Back Row: Albert "Leeter" Collier (second from left)

== Military service ==
In 1942, Collier enlisted in the Royal Australian Air Force, where he served in an Aircraft Repair Depot until the end of the war.

== Honours ==
Collier won the Brownlow Medal in 1929.

In 1996, Albert was inducted into the Australian Football Hall of Fame, and was named at centre half-back in Collingwood's Team of the Century.
