= George White =

George White may refer to:

== Artists and entertainers ==
- George White (artist) (c. 1684–1732), English mezzotint engraver, known for plumbago drawing
- George H. White, nom de plume of Pascual Enguídanos (1923–2006), Spanish writer
- George Leonard White (1838–1895), founder and first director of the Fisk Jubilee Singers
- George White (film editor) (1911–1998), American film editor
- George White (producer) (1891–1968), film and stage producer, known for George White's Scandals

== Military and intelligence officers ==
- George A. White (1880–1941), American author, journalist and U.S. Army general
- George Hunter White (1908–1975), American intelligence agent involved in OSS, MKULTRA and Operation Midnight Climax
- George White (British Army officer) (1835–1912), British field marshal, recipient of the Victoria Cross
- George Francis White (1808–1898), British Army officer and amateur artist

== Politicians ==
- George White (died 1584) (c. 1530–1584), MP for Liverpool
- George White (Liberal politician) (1840–1912), British Liberal member of parliament, 1900–1912
- George White (Ohio politician) (1872–1953), U.S. congressman, governor of Ohio
- George White (Mississippi politician), member of the Mississippi House of Representatives
- George White (Australian politician) (1905–1986), member of the Victorian Legislative Assembly
- George Boyle White (1802–1876), New South Wales politician
- George C. White (1856–1927), member of the Iowa House of Representatives
- George E. White (politician) (1848–1935), U.S. congressman from Illinois
- George Henry White (1852–1918), U.S. congressman from North Carolina
- George L. White (1858–1917), member of the Legislative Assembly of New Brunswick
- George Montgomery White (1828–1860), member of the North Carolina House of Commons
- George Stanley White (1897–1977), speaker of the Canadian Senate
- George W. White (Canadian politician) (1827–1912), political figure in New Brunswick, Canada
- George W. White (American politician) (c. 1841–?), member of both chambers of the Mississippi Legislature

== Religious figures ==
- George E. White (missionary) (1861–1946), Christian missionary and witness to the Armenian Genocide
- George White (archdeacon) (died 1929), Irish Anglican priest
- George White (dean of Cashel), Irish Anglican priest
- George White (preacher) (1802–1887), Episcopalian preacher, amateur historian, and archaeologist in Georgia, United States

== Sports ==
- George White (speedway rider), English speedway rider
- George White (footballer, born 1892) (1892–1953), Australian rules footballer for Carlton
- George White (footballer, born 1908) (1908–1966), Australian rules footballer for St Kilda
- George White (Canadian football) (born 1977), Canadian Football League

== Others ==
- George Malcolm White (1920–2011), American architect
- George Robert White (1847–1922), Boston philanthropist
- George Washington White (1931–2011), United States federal judge
- Sir George White, 1st Baronet (1854–1916), British businessman, founder of Bristol Aeroplane Company
- George W. White (educator), president of the University of Southern California, 1895–1899
- George White (1813–1876), tailor and vigneron in South Australia, founder of White's Rooms
- George White (merchant) (1648–?), English merchant and co-founder of the reformed East India Company
- George White (died 1903), American murder victim, see lynching of George White

== See also ==
- George Whyte (1933–2012), English author, composer, dramatist and art collector
- George Whyte (footballer) (1909–1992), Scottish professional footballer
