= Racism against African Americans =

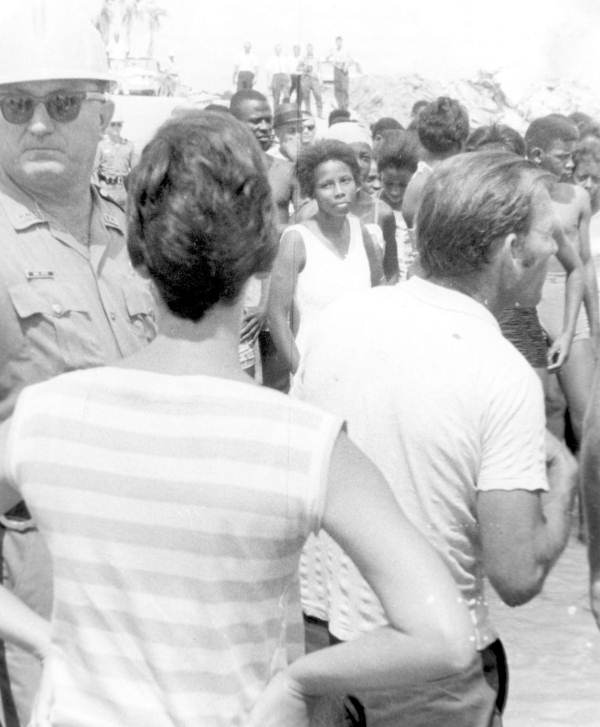
White segregationists (foreground) trying to prevent Black people from swimming at a "Whites only" beach in St. Augustine, Florida in 1964

In the context of racism in the United States, racism against African Americans dates back to the colonial era, and continues to be a persistent issue in American society in the 21st century.

From the arrival of the first Africans in early colonial times until after the American Civil War, most African Americans were enslaved by white people. Even free African Americans have faced restrictions on their political, social, and economic freedoms, being subjected to lynchings, segregation, Black Codes, Jim Crow laws, and other forms of discrimination, both before and after the Civil War. Thanks to the civil rights movement, formal racial discrimination was gradually outlawed by the federal government and came to be perceived as socially and morally unacceptable by large elements of American society. Despite this, racism against Black Americans remains in the U.S., as does socioeconomic inequality between black and white Americans. (Note: In his 2009 visit to the US, the [UN] Special Rapporteur on Racism noted that "Socio-economic indicators show that poverty, race and ethnicity continue to overlap in the United States. This reality is a direct legacy of the past, in particular, it is a direct legacy of slavery, segregation and the forcible resettlement of Native Americans, which was confronted by the United States during the civil rights movement. However, whereas the country managed to establish equal treatment and non-discrimination in its laws, it has yet to redress the socioeconomic consequences of the historical legacy of racism.") In 1863, two years prior to emancipation, Black people owned 0.5 percent of the national wealth, while in 2019 it is just over 1.5 percent.

In recent years research has uncovered extensive evidence of racial discrimination in various sectors of modern U.S. society, including the criminal justice system, businesses, the economy, housing, health care, the media, and politics. In the view of the United Nations and the US Human Rights Network, "discrimination in the United States permeates all aspects of life and extends to all communities of color."

== Citizenship and voting rights ==
The Naturalization Act of 1790 set the first uniform rules for the granting of United States citizenship by naturalization, which limited naturalization to "free white person[s]", thus excluding from citizenship Native Americans, indentured servants, slaves, free Blacks, and later Asians. Citizenship and the lack of it had special impact on various legal and political rights, most notably suffrage rights at both the federal and state level, as well as the right to hold certain government offices, jury duty, military service, and many other activities, besides access to government assistance and services. The second Militia Act of 1792 also provided for the conscription of every "free able-bodied white male citizen". Tennessee's 1834 Constitution included a provision: "the free white men of this State have a right to Keep and bear arms for their common defense."

Citizenship, however, did not guarantee any particular rights, such as the right to vote. Black Americans, for example, who gained formal U.S. citizenship by 1870, were soon disenfranchised. For instance, after 1890, less than 9,000 of Mississippi's 147,000 eligible African-American voters were registered to vote, or about 6%. Louisiana went from 130,000 registered African-American voters in 1896 to 1,342 in 1904 (about a 99% decrease). They were also subjected to Black Codes and discriminated against in the Southern states by Jim Crow laws. Voter suppression efforts around the country, though mainly motivated by political considerations, often effectively disproportionately affect African Americans and other minorities. In 2016, one in 13 African-Americans of voting age was disenfranchised, more than four times greater than that of non-African-Americans. Over 7.4% of adult African-Americans were disenfranchised compared to 1.8% of non-African-Americans. Felony disenfranchisement in Florida disqualifies over 10% of its citizens for life and over 23% of its African-American citizens.

== Antebellum period ==
Slavery, as a form of forced labor, has existed in many cultures, dating back to early human civilizations. Slavery is not inherently racial per se. In the United States, however, slavery, having been established in the colonial era, became racialized by the time of the American Revolution (1775–1783), when slavery was widely institutionalized as a racial caste system which was based on African ancestry and skin color.

=== Slavery ===
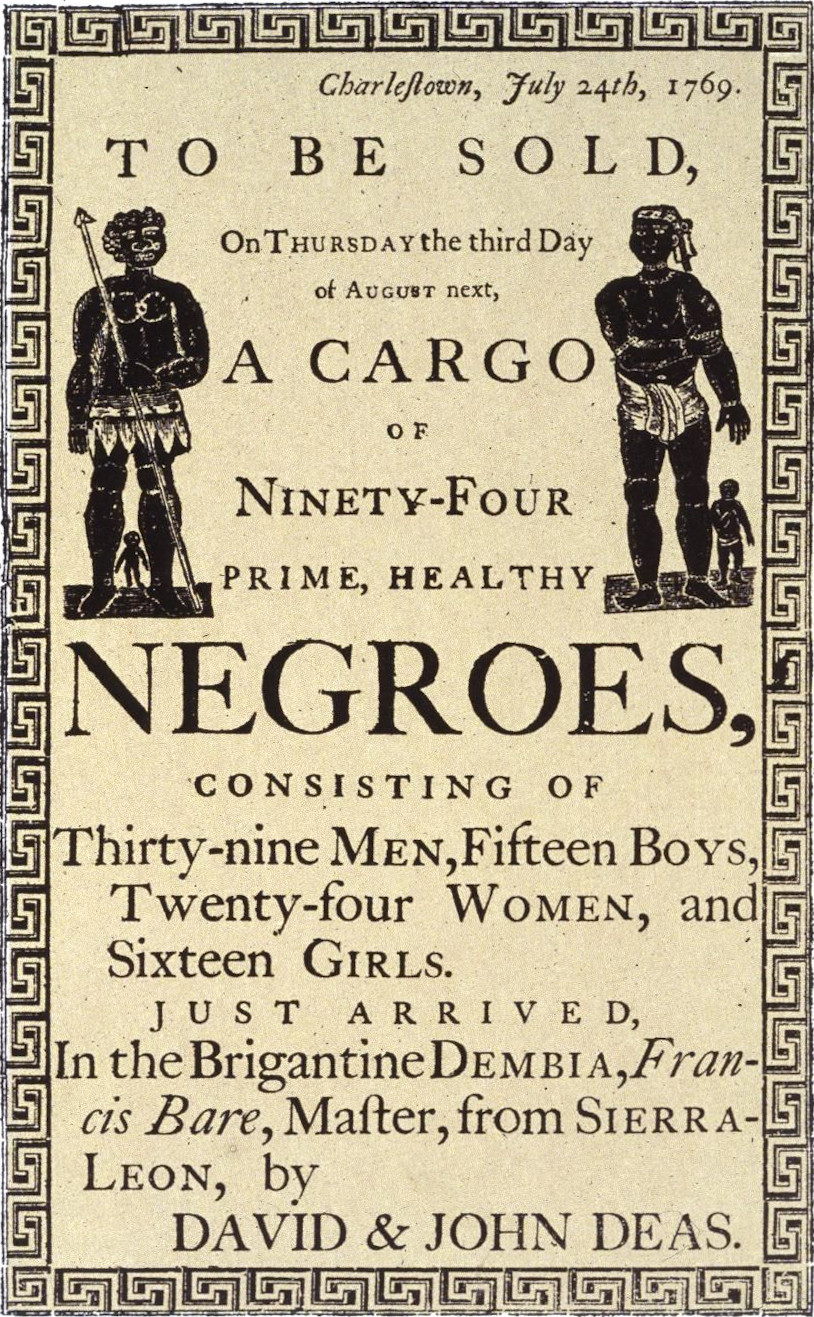
Reproduction of a handbill advertising a slave auction in Charleston, South Carolina, in 1769

The Atlantic slave trade prospered, with more than 470,000 persons forcibly transported from Africa between 1626 and 1860 to what is now the United States. Prior to the Civil War, eight serving presidents were slaveholders, and slavery was protected by the U.S. Constitution. Creating wealth for the White elite, approximately one in four Southern families held Black people in slavery prior to the Civil War. According to the 1860 U.S. census, there were about 385,000 slave owners out of a White population of approximately 7 million in the slave states. White European Americans who participated in the slave industry sought to justify their economic exploitation of Black people by creating a "scientific" theory of White superiority and Black inferiority. Thomas Jefferson, a slave owner himself, called for science to determine the obvious "inferiority" of Black people that is regarded as "an extremely important stage in the evolution of scientific racism." He concluded that Black people were "inferior to the whites in the endowments of body and mind."

Groups of armed White men, who were called slave patrols, were formed to monitor enslaved Black people. First established in South Carolina in 1704 and later established in other slave states, their function was to police slaves, especially runaways. Slave owners feared that slaves might organize revolts or rebellions, so state militias were formed to provide a military command structure and discipline within the slave patrols so they could be used to detect, encounter, and crush any organized slave meetings which might lead to revolts or rebellions.

=== Controlling free Blacks ===
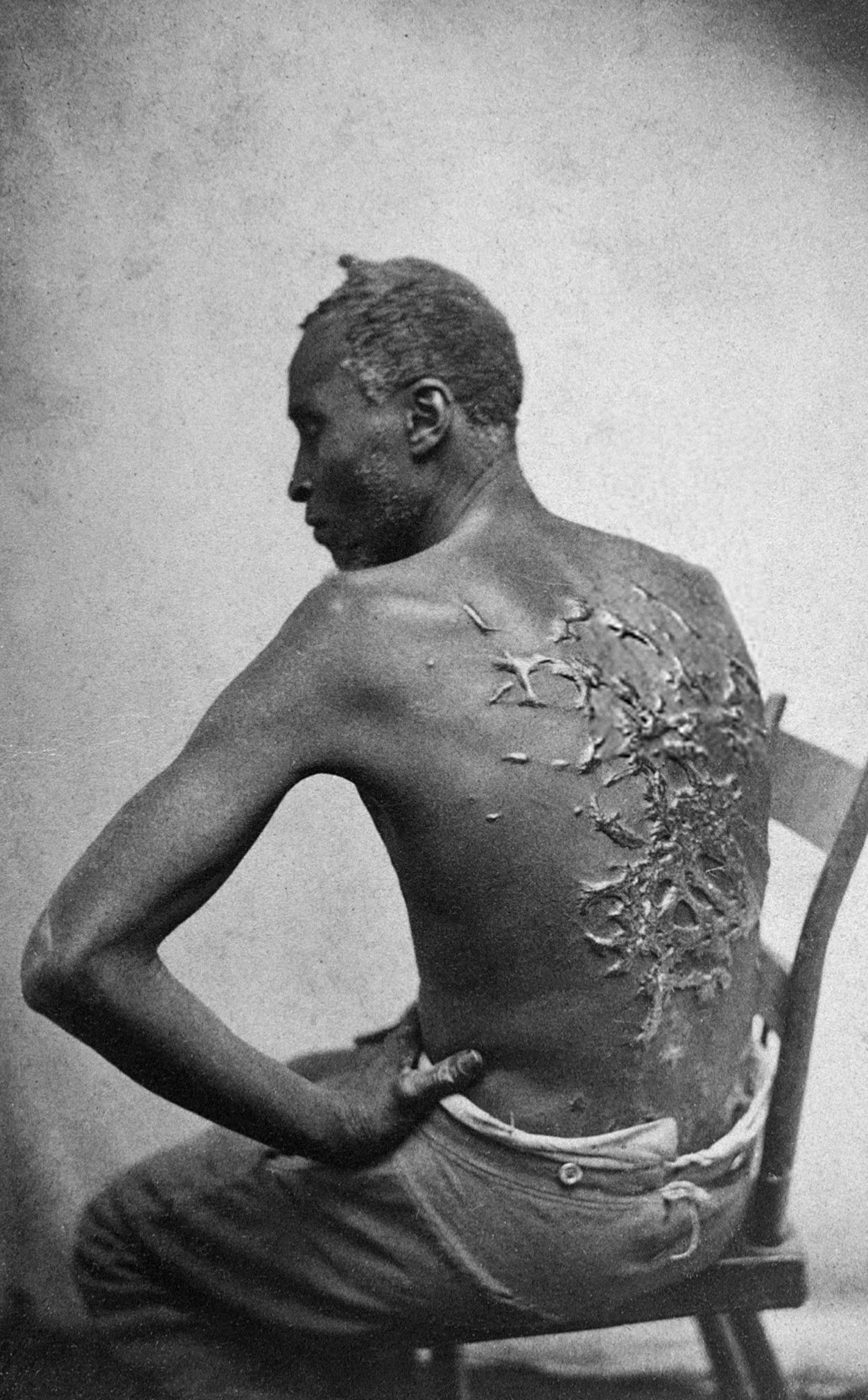
A photograph of Gordon showing the scars accumulated from whipping during his enslavement

During the 1820s and 1830s, the solution of the American Colonization Society (ACS) to the presence of free Black people was to persuade them to emigrate to Africa. In 1821, the ACS established the colony of Liberia, and persuaded thousands of former slaves and free Blacks to move there. Some slaves were manumitted (set free) on the condition that they emigrate. The slave states made no secret that they wanted to get rid of free Blacks, who they believed threatened their investment, the slaves, encouraging escapes and revolts. The support for the ACS was primarily Southern. The founder of the ACS, Henry Clay of Kentucky, stated that because of "unconquerable prejudice resulting from their color, they never could amalgamate with the free whites of this country. It was desirable, therefore, as it respected them, and the residue of the population of the country, to drain them off". Thousands of Black people were resettled in Liberia, where they formed an American English-speaking enclave which could not assimilate back into African life and as a result, most of them died of tropical diseases.

White supremacist American governments emphasized the importance of the subjugation and control of other racial populations. In 1824 the Senate of South Carolina enacted a resolution echoing the wording of the Supremacy Clause of the Constitution of the United States, declaring that the paramount objective of its government was to prevent the insubordination of black citizens and any possible slave rebellions as well as any social or political causes which might instrumentally lead to such insubordination or insurrection, and declaring that this purpose was paramount over all other laws, constitutions, and domestic or international agreements:

Resolved, That it is as much the duty of the state to guard against insubordination or insurrection among our colored population, or to control and regulate any cause which might excite or produce it, as to guard against any other evil, political or physical, which might assail us. This duty is paramount to all laws, all treaties, all constitutions. It arises from the supreme and permanent law of nature, the law of self-preservation; and will never, by this state, be renounced, compromised, controlled or participated with any power whatever.

=== Domestic slave trade ===
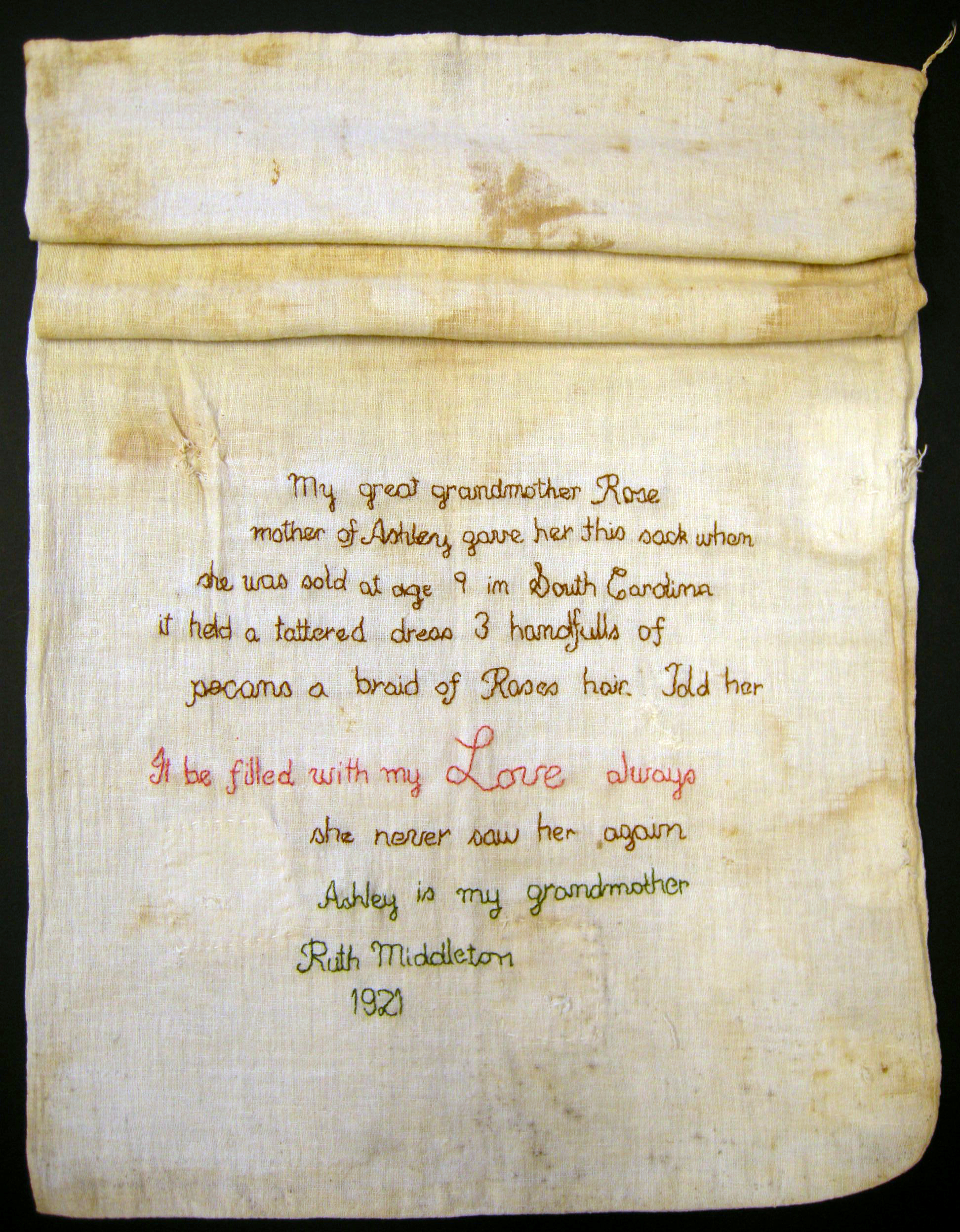
Ashley's Sack, a cloth that recounts a slave sale separating a mother and her daughter. The sack belonged to a nine-year-old girl, Ashley. It was a parting gift from her mother, Rose, after Ashley had been sold. Rose filled the sack with a dress, braid of her hair, pecans, and "my love always".

The importation of slaves into the United States was outlawed by federal law from 1808, but smuggling continued, the last known ship to bring enslaved Africans to the United States being the Clotilda in 1859 or 1860. The domestic trade in human beings continued to be a major economic activity. Maryland and Virginia, for example, would export surplus slaves to the south. (See Franklin and Armfield Office.) Enslaved family members could be split up (i.e., sold off) never to see or hear of each other again. Between 1830 and 1840, nearly 250,000 slaves were taken across state lines. In the 1850s, more than 193,000 were transported, and historians estimate nearly one million in total were traded.

The historian Ira Berlin called this forced migration of slaves the "Second Middle Passage", because it reproduced many of the same horrors as the Middle Passage (the name given to the transportation of slaves from Africa to North America). These sales of slaves broke up many families, with Berlin writing that whether slaves were directly uprooted or lived in fear that they or their families would be involuntarily moved, "the massive deportation traumatized black people". Individuals lost their connection to families and clans. Added to the earlier colonists combining slaves from different tribes, many ethnic Africans lost their knowledge of varying tribal origins in Africa. Most were descended from families who had been in the U.S. for many generations.

== Civil War and emancipation ==
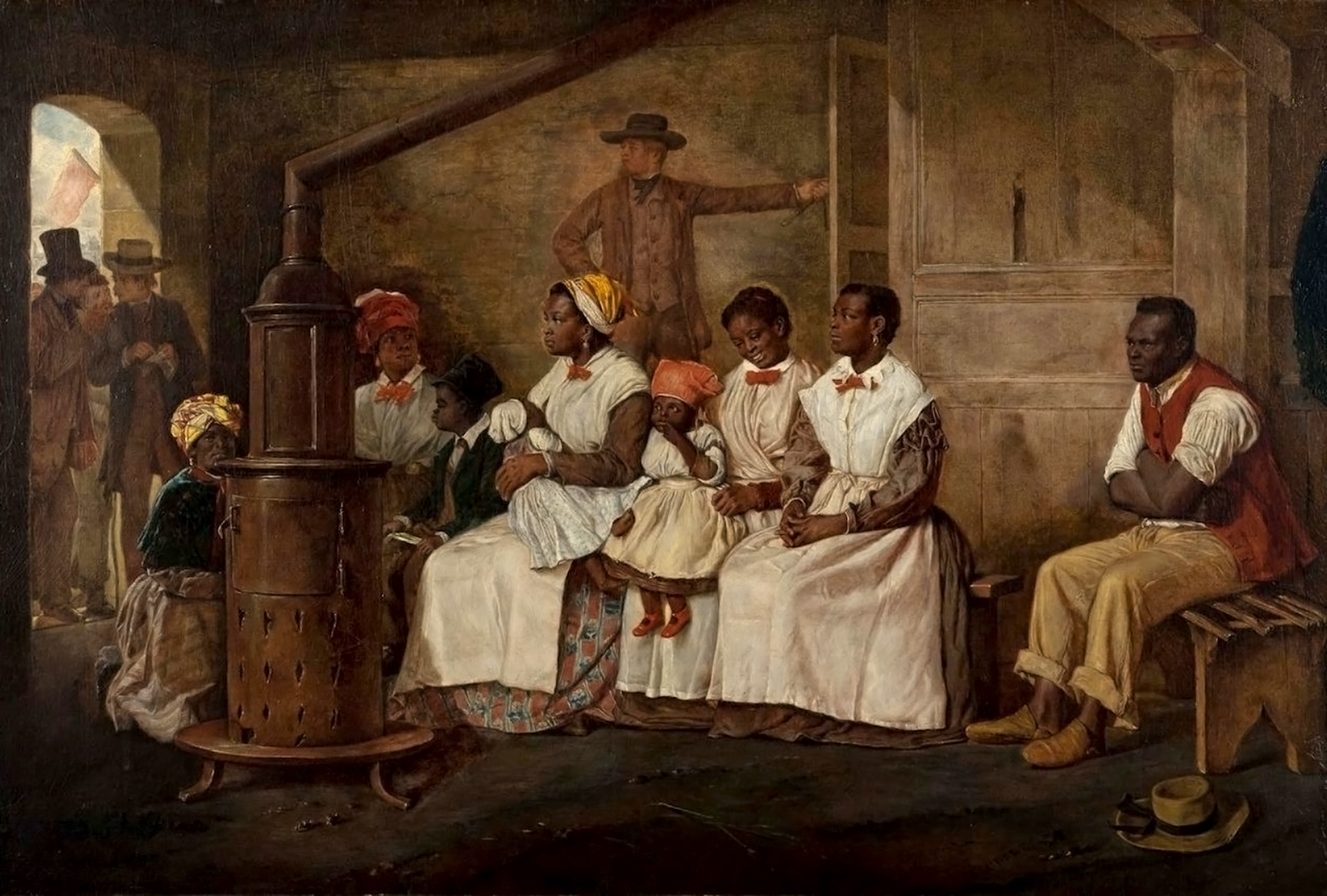
Slaves Waiting for Sale: Richmond, Virginia, 1853

During the American Civil War, the Militia Act of 1862, for the first time, allowed African Americans to serve in the Union militias as soldiers. However, Black members were discriminated against in pay, with Black members being paid half of White members. Besides discrimination in pay, colored units were often disproportionately assigned laborer work, rather than combat assignments. General Daniel Ullman, commander of the United States Colored Troops, remarked "I fear that many high officials outside of Washington have no other intention than that these men shall be used as diggers and drudges." Black members were organized into colored regiments. By the end of that war, in April 1865, 175 colored regiments were constituting about one-tenth of the Union Army. About 20 percent of colored soldiers died, their death toll being about 35 percent higher than that of white Union troops. The 1862 Militia Act, however, did not open military service to all races, only to Black Americans. In the Confederate army, non-white men were not permitted to serve as soldiers.

President Abraham Lincoln's Emancipation Proclamation, which took effect on January 1, 1863, marked a change in the federal government's position on slavery. (Up to that time, the federal government had never even taken a limited pro-emancipation stance, and it could do so only in 1862 because of the 1861 departure of almost all of the Southern members of Congress). Though the proclamation was welcomed by abolitionists, its application was limited. It did not apply, for example, to the nearly 500,000 slaves in the slave-holding border states of Delaware, Kentucky, Maryland, Missouri, and the new state of West Virginia, and it also did not apply in parts of Louisiana and Virginia that were occupied by Union forces. In those states, slavery remained legal until abolished by state action or by the ratification of the Thirteenth Amendment in December 1865.

While personally opposed to slavery (see Abraham Lincoln and slavery), Lincoln accepted the federal consensus that the Constitution did not give Congress the power to end it. But he was also Commander in Chief of the Army and Navy. An action based on military necessity, against states that were in rebellion, would be appropriate as a step towards their defeat. The South of course interpreted the Emancipation Proclamation as a hostile act, but it allowed Lincoln to abolish slavery to a limited extent, without igniting resistance from anti-abolitionist forces in the Union. The slaves were not immediately affected by the proclamation, but advancing Union armies freed them.

About four million Black slaves were freed in 1865. Ninety-five percent of Black people lived in the South, comprising one-third of its total population, while only five percent of Black people lived in the North, comprising only one percent of its total population. Consequently, fears of eventual emancipation were much greater in the South than in the North. Based on 1860 census figures, eight percent of males who were aged 13 to 43 died in the Civil War, including six percent in the North and eighteen percent in the South.

Though the Thirteenth Amendment formally abolished slavery throughout the United States, some Black Americans became subjected to revised forms of involuntary labor, particularly in the South, through the use of Black Codes that restricted African Americans' freedom and compelled them to work for low wages, and through the use of the exception in the Thirteenth Amendment, which permitted slavery "as a punishment for crime". They were also subject to White supremacist violence and selective enforcement of statutes.

Land redistribution programs, such as the Homestead Acts, were most often closed to African Americans (or subject to harsh racist backlash), though some did succeed in obtaining land.

== From the Reconstruction Era to World War II ==
=== Reconstruction era ===
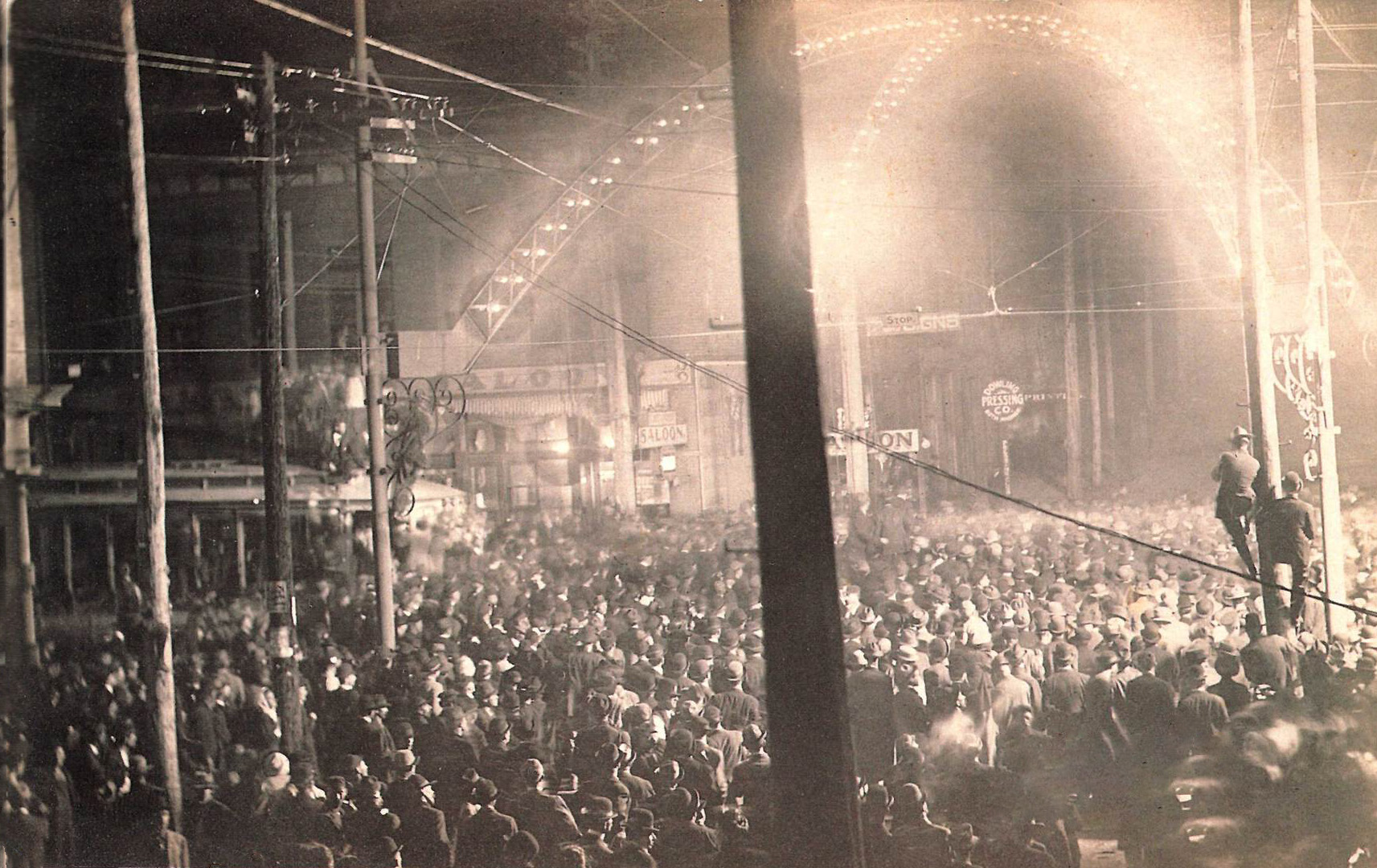
The mob-style lynching of Will James, Cairo, Illinois, 1909. A crowd of thousands watched the lynching.

After the Civil War, on December 6, 1865, the 13th Amendment, formally abolishing slavery, was ratified. The next year, Congress passed the Civil Rights Act of 1866, which provided a range of civil rights and granted them to all persons who were born in the United States. Despite this, the emergence of Black Codes sanctioned acts of subjugation against Black people and they also continued to bar African Americans from exercising their civil rights. The Naturalization Act of 1790 had granted U.S. citizenship only to whites, and in 1868 the effort to broaden civil rights was underscored by the passage of the 14th Amendment, which granted citizenship to "[a]ll persons born or naturalized in the United States", regardless of race. The Civil Rights Act of 1875 followed, which was eliminated in a decision that undermined federal power to thwart private racial discrimination. Nonetheless, the last of the Reconstruction Era amendments, the 15th Amendment promised voting rights to African American men (previously only white men of property could vote), and these cumulative federal efforts, African Americans began taking advantage of enfranchisement. They began voting, seeking office positions, and getting a public education.

By the end of Reconstruction in the mid-1870s, violent white supremacists came to power with the assistance of paramilitary groups such as the Red Shirts and the White League and imposed Jim Crow laws which deprived African-Americans of voting rights by instituting systemic and discriminatory policies of unequal racial segregation. Segregation, which began with slavery, continued with the passage and enforcement of Jim Crow laws, along with the posting of signs which were used to show Black people where they could legally walk, talk, drink, rest, or eat. This also applied to where Black people could safely travel to by car as many had to use a Black travel guide called the Green Book. For those places that were racially mixed, non-Whites had to wait until all White customers were dealt with. Segregated facilities extended from White-only schools to White-only graveyards.

Anti-miscegenation laws, which forbade marriage and even sex between whites and non-whites (which typically covered Blacks but in some cases also Indians and Asians), existed in most of the states well into the 20th century, even after emancipation and even in states that advocated the abolition of slavery. Such anti-miscegenation laws existed in many states until 1967, when the United States Supreme Court unanimously ruled in Loving v. Virginia that such laws were unconstitutional.

=== Post-Reconstruction era ===
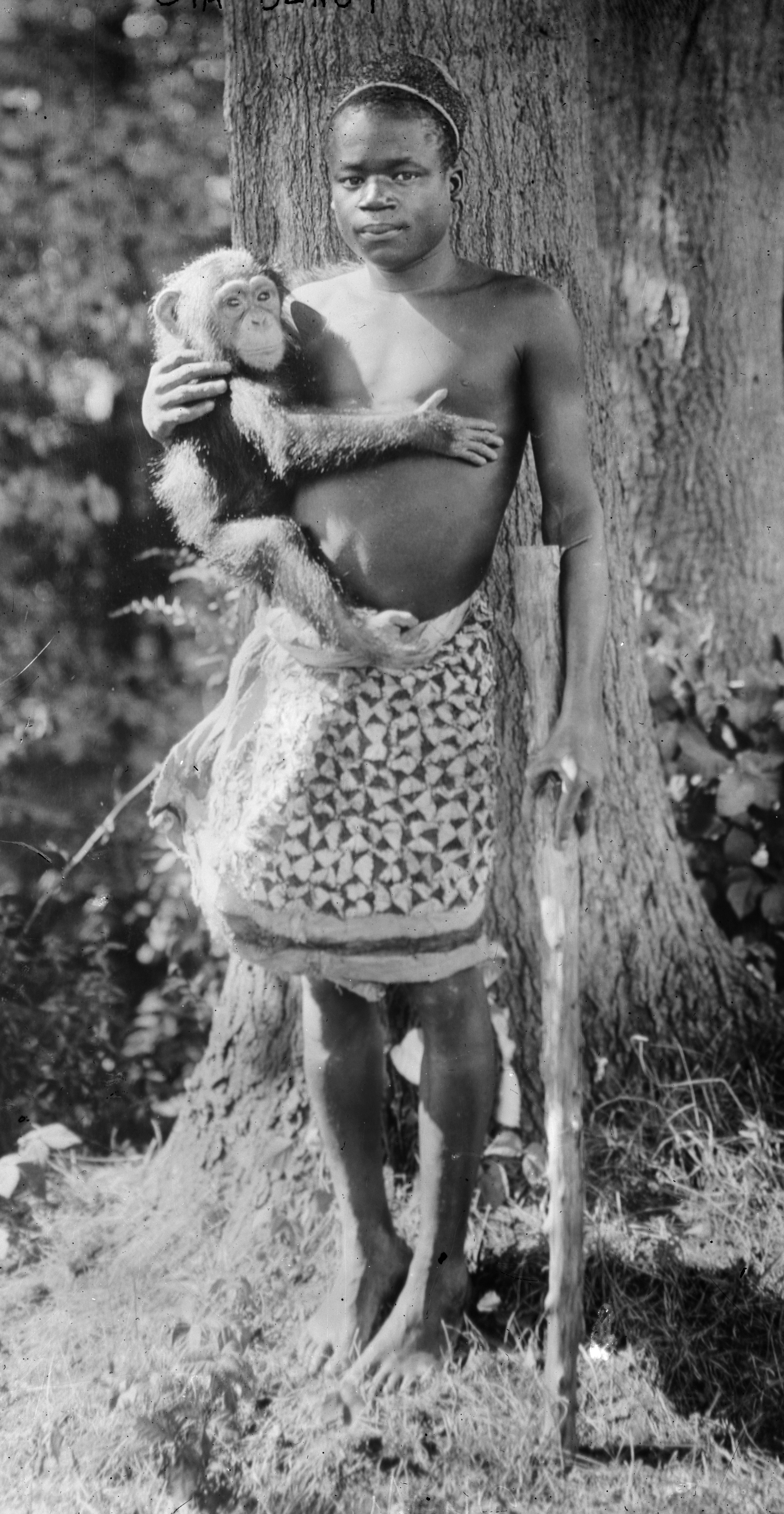
Ota Benga was exhibited in the Monkey House of the Bronx Zoo, New York, in 1906.

The new century saw a hardening of institutionalized racism and legal discrimination against citizens of African descent in the United States. Throughout the post Civil War period, racial stratification was informally and systemically enforced, to solidify the pre-existing social order. Although they were technically able to vote, poll taxes, pervasive acts of terrorism such as lynchings (often perpetrated by hate groups such as the reborn Ku Klux Klan, founded in the Reconstruction South), and discriminatory laws such as grandfather clauses kept Black Americans (and many Poor Whites) disenfranchised particularly in the South. Furthermore, the discrimination was extended to state legislation which "allocated vastly unequal financial support" for Black and White schools. In addition to this, county officials sometimes redistributed resources which were earmarked for Black people to White schools, further undermining educational opportunities. In response to de jure racism, protest and lobbyist groups emerged, most notably, the NAACP (National Association for the Advancement of Colored People) in 1909.

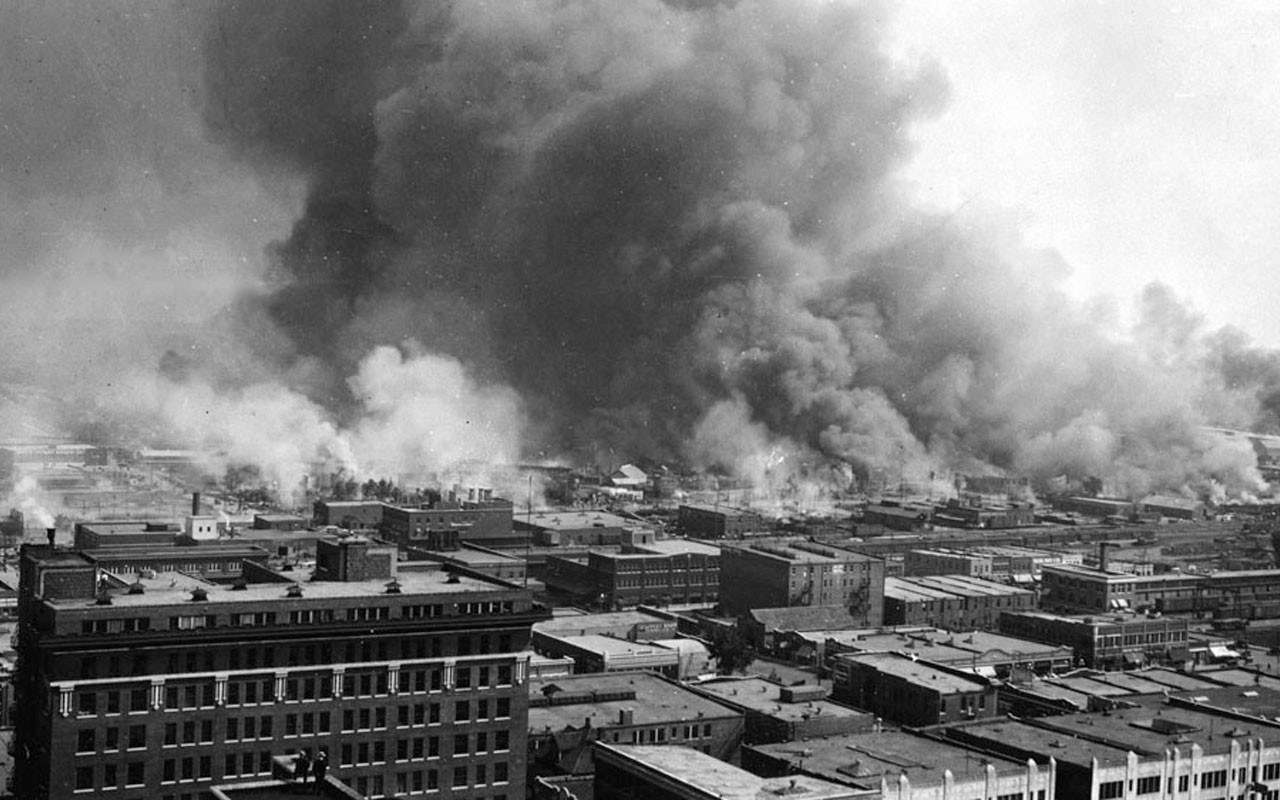
During the 1921 Tulsa race massacre thousands of Whites rampaged through the Black community, killing men and women, burning and looting stores and homes. It's estimated that 300 people were killed.

This era is sometimes referred to as the nadir of American race relations because racism, segregation, racial discrimination, and expressions of White supremacy all increased. So did anti-Black violence, including race riots such as the Atlanta race riot of 1906, the Elaine massacre of 1919, the Tulsa race massacre of 1921, and the Rosewood massacre of 1923. The Atlanta riot was characterized as a "racial massacre of negroes" by the French newspaper Le Petit Journal. The Charleston News and Courier wrote in response to the Atlanta riots:

"Separation of the races is the only radical solution of the negro problem in this country. There is nothing new about it. It was the Almighty who established the bounds of the habitation of the races. The negroes were brought here by compulsion; they should be induced to leave here by persuasion."

=== Great Migration ===
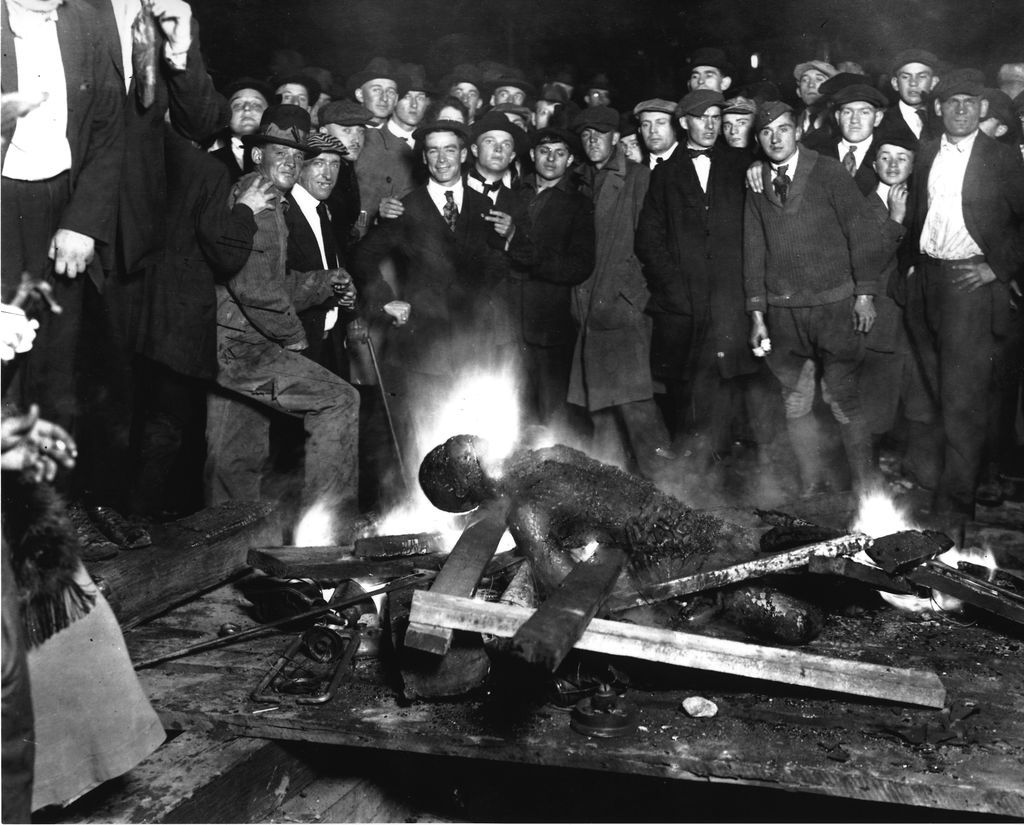
A group of White men pose for a 1919 photograph as they stand over the body of the Black lynching victim Will Brown before they decide to mutilate and burn it during the Omaha race riot of 1919 in Omaha, Nebraska. Photographs and postcards of lynchings were popular souvenirs in the U.S.

In addition, racism, which had been viewed as a problem which primarily existed in the Southern states, burst onto the nation's consciousness following the Great Migration, the relocation of millions of African Americans from their roots in the rural Southern states to the industrial centers of the North and West between 1910 and 1970, particularly in cities such as Boston, St. Louis, Chicago, Detroit, New York City (Harlem), Cleveland, Los Angeles, Oakland, Seattle, Phoenix, and Denver. Within Chicago, for example, between 1910 and 1970, the population fraction of African-Americans leapt from 2.0 percent to 32.7 percent. The demographic patterns of Black migrants and external economic conditions are largely studied stimulants regarding the Great Migration. For example, migrating Black people (between 1910 and 1920) were more likely to be literate than Blacks who remained in the South. Known economic push factors played a role in migration, such as the emergence of a split labor market and agricultural distress which resulted from the boll weevil destruction of the cotton economy.

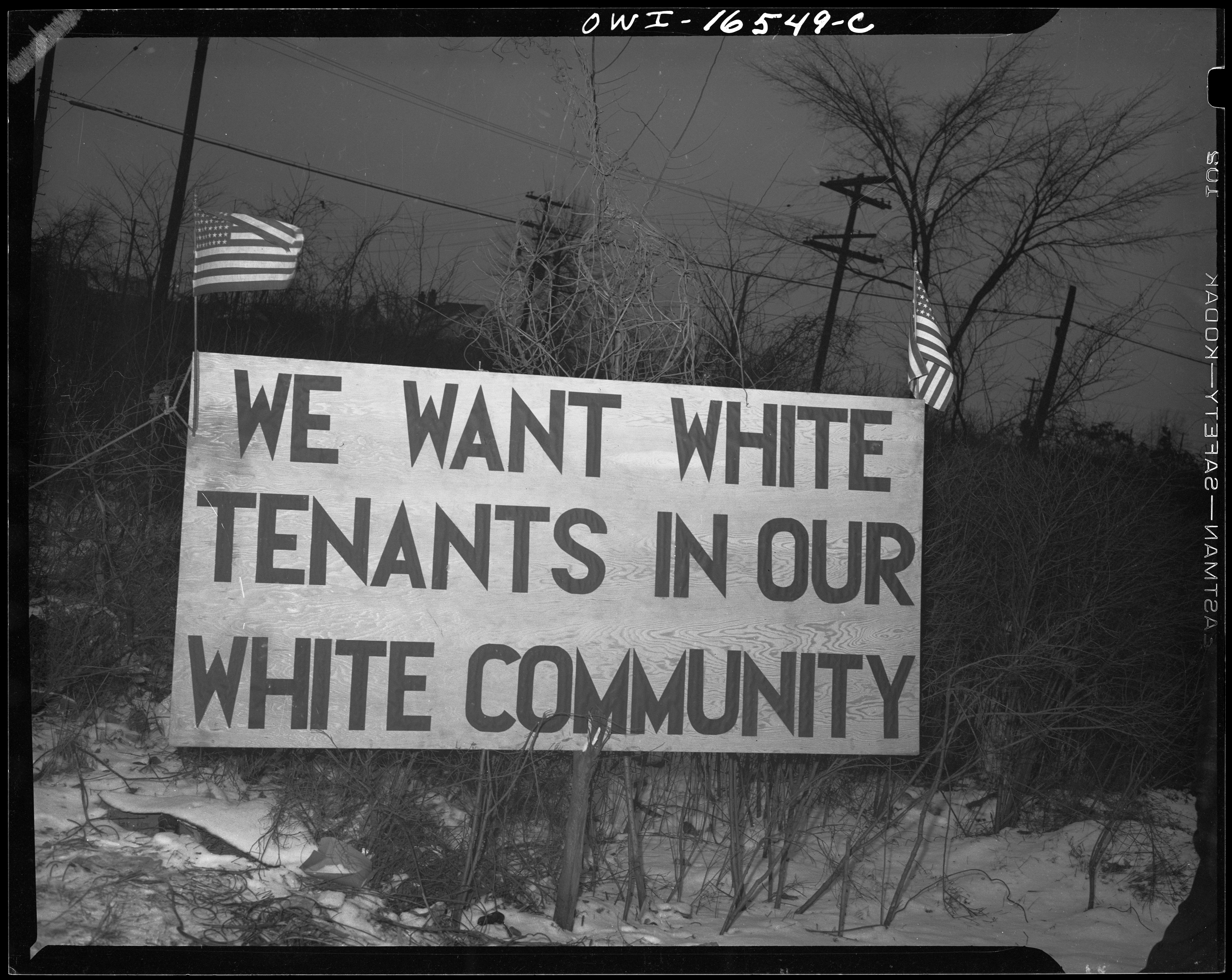
White tenants seeking to prevent Black people from moving into the housing project erected this sign. Detroit, 1942. Photograph by Arthur Siegel.

Southern migrants were often treated in accordance with pre-existing racial stratification. The rapid influx of Black people into the North and West disturbed the racial balance within cities, exacerbating hostility between both Black and White residents in the two regions. Stereotypic schemas of Southern Blacks were used to attribute issues in urban areas, such as crime and disease, to the presence of African-Americans. Overall, African-Americans in most Northern and Western cities experienced systemic discrimination in a plethora of aspects of life. Within employment, economic opportunities for Black people were routed to the lowest-status and restrictive in potential mobility. In 1900 Reverend Matthew Anderson, speaking at the annual Hampton Negro Conference in Virginia, said that "...the lines along most of the avenues of wage earning are more rigidly drawn in the North than in the South. There seems to be an apparent effort throughout the North, especially in the cities to debar the colored worker from all the avenues of higher remunerative labor, which makes it more difficult to improve his economic condition even than in the South." Within the housing market, stronger discriminatory measures were used in correlation to the influx, resulting in a mix of "targeted violence, restrictive covenants, redlining and racial steering". A club central to the Harlem Renaissance in the 1920s, the Cotton Club in Harlem, New York City, was a whites-only establishment, with Black acts allowed to perform, but to a White audience.

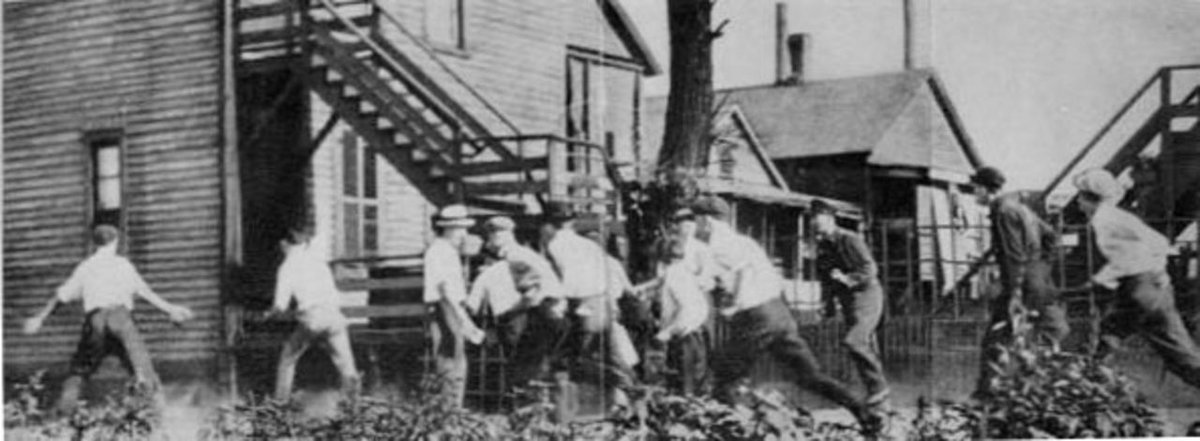
A White gang looking for Black people during the Chicago race riot of 1919

Throughout this period, racial tensions exploded, most violently in Chicago, and lynchings—mob-directed hangings, usually racially motivated—increased dramatically in the 1920s. Urban riots—Whites attacking Blacks—became a northern and western problem. Many Whites defended their space with violence, intimidation, or legal tactics toward African Americans, while many other Whites migrated to more racially homogeneous suburban or exurban regions, a process known as White flight. Racially restrictive housing covenants were ruled unenforceable under the Fourteenth Amendment in the 1948 landmark Supreme Court case Shelley v. Kraemer.

Elected in 1912, President Woodrow Wilson authorized the practice of racial segregation throughout the federal government's bureaucracy. In World War I, Black people who served in the United States Armed Forces served in segregated units. Black soldiers were often poorly trained and equipped, and they were often put on the frontlines and forced to go on suicide missions. The U.S. military was still heavily segregated during World War II. In addition, no African-American was awarded the Medal of Honor during the war, and sometimes, Black soldiers who traveled on trains had to give their seats up to Nazi prisoners of war.

== From World War II to the civil rights movement ==
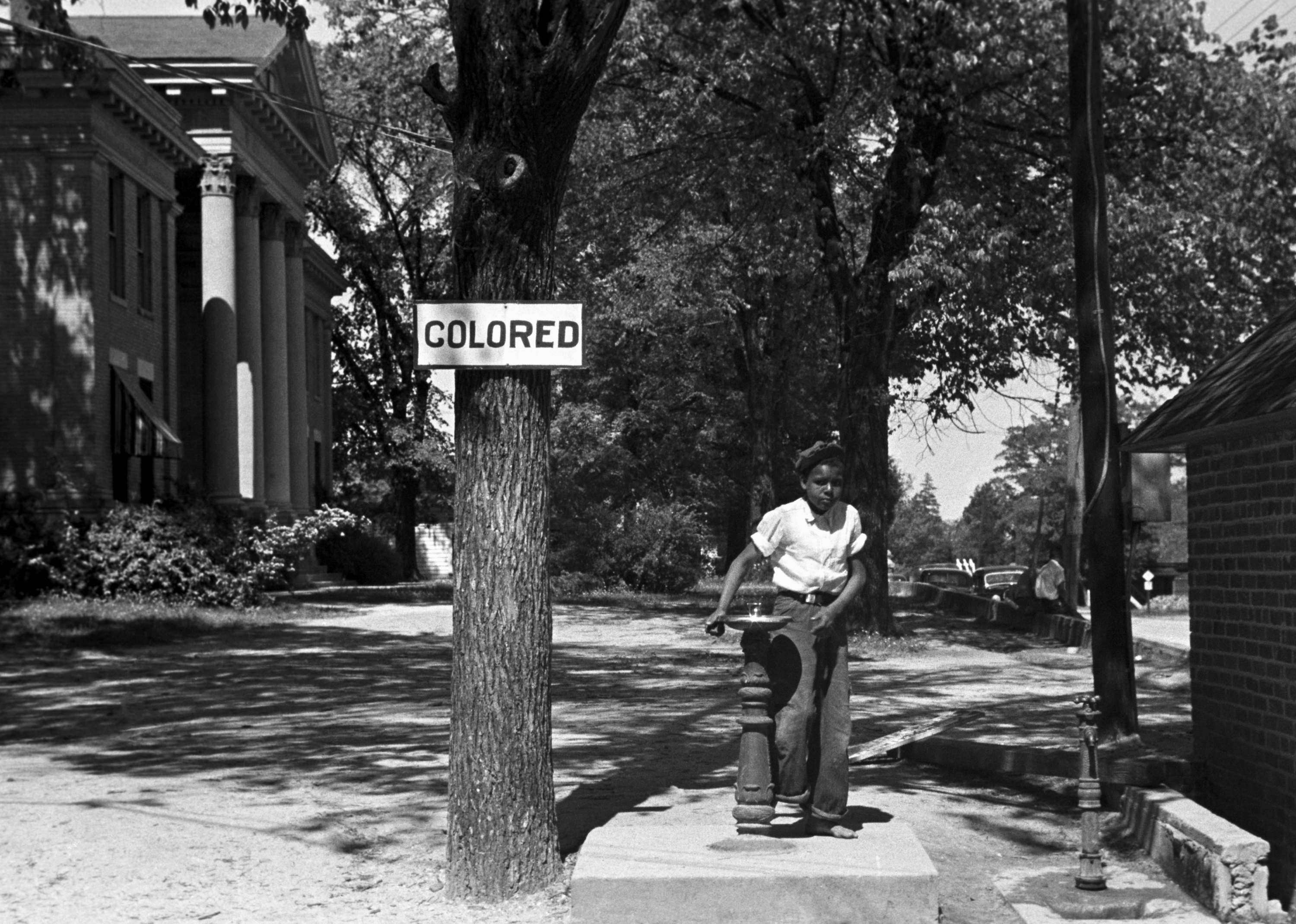
A Black youth at a segregated ("colored") drinking fountain in Halifax, North Carolina, in 1938

The Jim Crow laws were state and local laws which were enacted in the Southern and border states of the United States and enforced between 1876 and 1965. They mandated "separate but equal" status for Black people. In reality, this led to treatment and accommodations that were almost always inferior to those which were provided to Whites. The most important laws required that public schools, public places and public transportation, like trains and buses, have separate facilities for Whites and Blacks. State-sponsored school segregation was declared unconstitutional by the Supreme Court of the United States in 1954 in Brown v. Board of Education. One of the first federal court cases which challenged segregation in schools was Mendez v. Westminster in 1946.

Access to public benefits was also a matter of concern for African Americans, who were excluded from most of the gains acquired by white Americans via programs like the G.I. Bill following World War II. During the Great Depression, Most black working women, and many black men, were likewise excluded from New Deal programs such as unemployment insurance and Social Security.

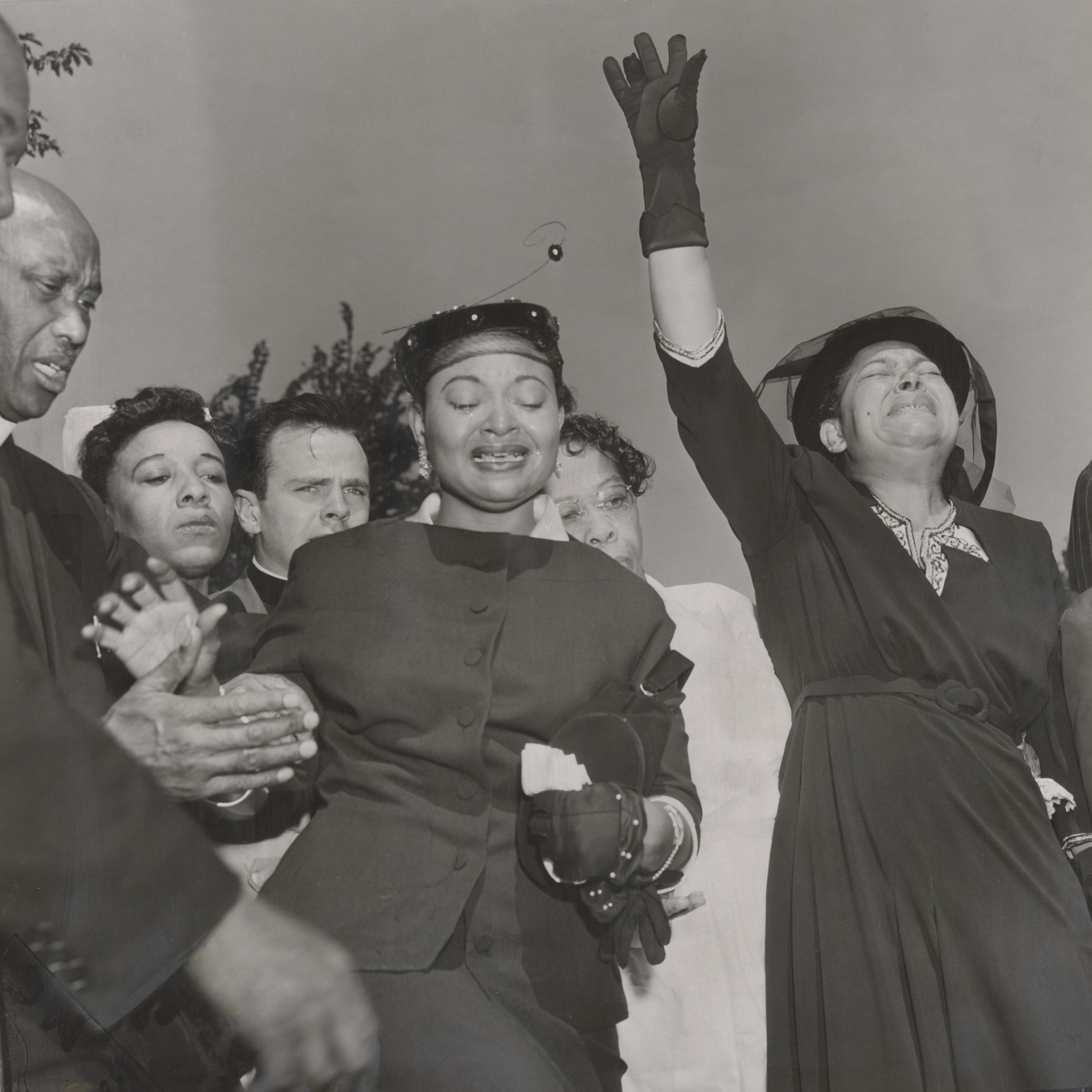
Emmett Till's mother Mamie (middle) at her son's funeral in 1955. He was killed by White men after a White woman accused him of offending her in her family's grocery store.

By the 1950s, the Civil Rights Movement was gaining momentum. Membership in the NAACP increased in states across the U.S. A 1955 lynching that sparked public outrage about injustice was that of Emmett Till, a 14-year-old boy from Chicago. Spending the summer with his relatives in Money, Mississippi, Till was killed for allegedly having wolf-whistled at a White woman. Till had been badly beaten, one of his eyes was gouged out, and he was shot in the head before being thrown into the Tallahatchie River, his body weighed down with a 70-pound (32 kg) cotton gin fan tied around his neck with barbed wire. David Jackson writes that Mamie Till, Emmett's Mother, "brought him home to Chicago and insisted on an open casket. Tens of thousands filed past Till's remains, but it was the publication of the searing funeral image in Jet, with a stoic Mamie gazing at her murdered child's ravaged body, that forced the world to reckon with the brutality of American racism." News photographs were circulated around the country, and they drew an intense public reaction. The visceral response to his mother's decision to have an open-casket funeral mobilized the Black community throughout the U.S. Vann R. Newkirk wrote "the trial of his killers became a pageant illuminating the tyranny of White supremacy". The state of Mississippi tried two defendants, Roy Bryant and J.W. Milam, but they were speedily acquitted by an all-White jury.

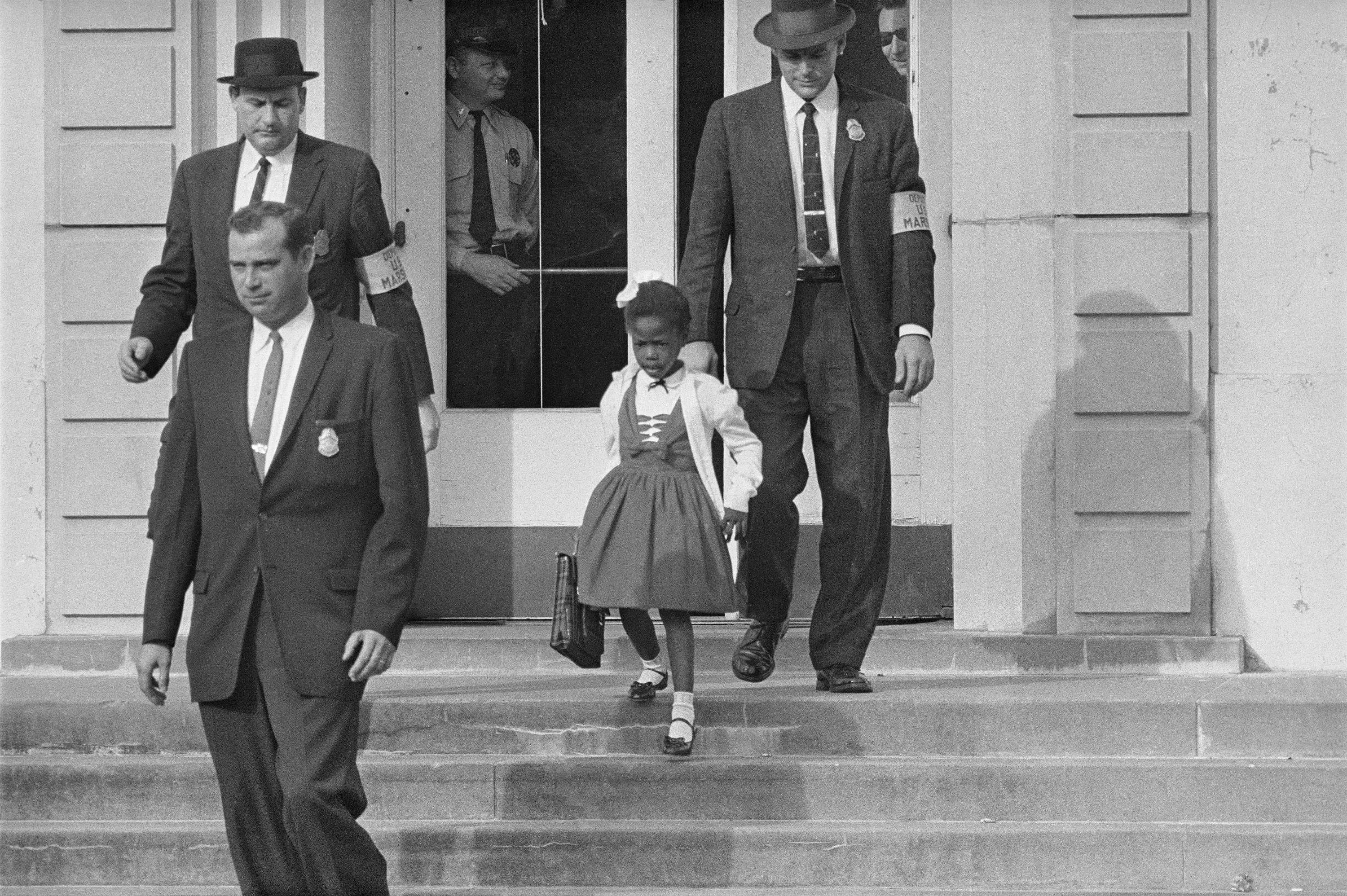
Due to threats and violence against her, U.S. Marshals escorted six-year-old Ruby Bridges to and from the previously–whites-only William Frantz Elementary School in New Orleans, 1960. As soon as Bridges entered the school, White parents pulled their children out.

In response to heightening discrimination and violence, non-violent acts of protest began to occur. For example, in February 1960, in Greensboro, North Carolina, four young African American college students entered a Woolworth store and sat down at the counter but were refused service. The men had learned about non-violent protest in college, and continued to sit peacefully as Whites tormented them at the counter, pouring ketchup on their heads and burning them with cigarettes. The Greensboro sit-ins contributed to the formation of the Student Nonviolent Coordinating Committee. Many more sit-ins took place to non-violently protest against racism and inequality. Sit-ins continued throughout the South and spread to other areas. Eventually, after many sit-ins and other non-violent protests, including marches and boycotts, places began to agree to desegregate.

In June 1963, civil rights activist and NAACP member Medgar Evers was assassinated by Byron De La Beckwith, a member of the White Citizens' Council. In his trials for murder De La Beckwith evaded conviction via all-White juries (both trials ended with hung juries).

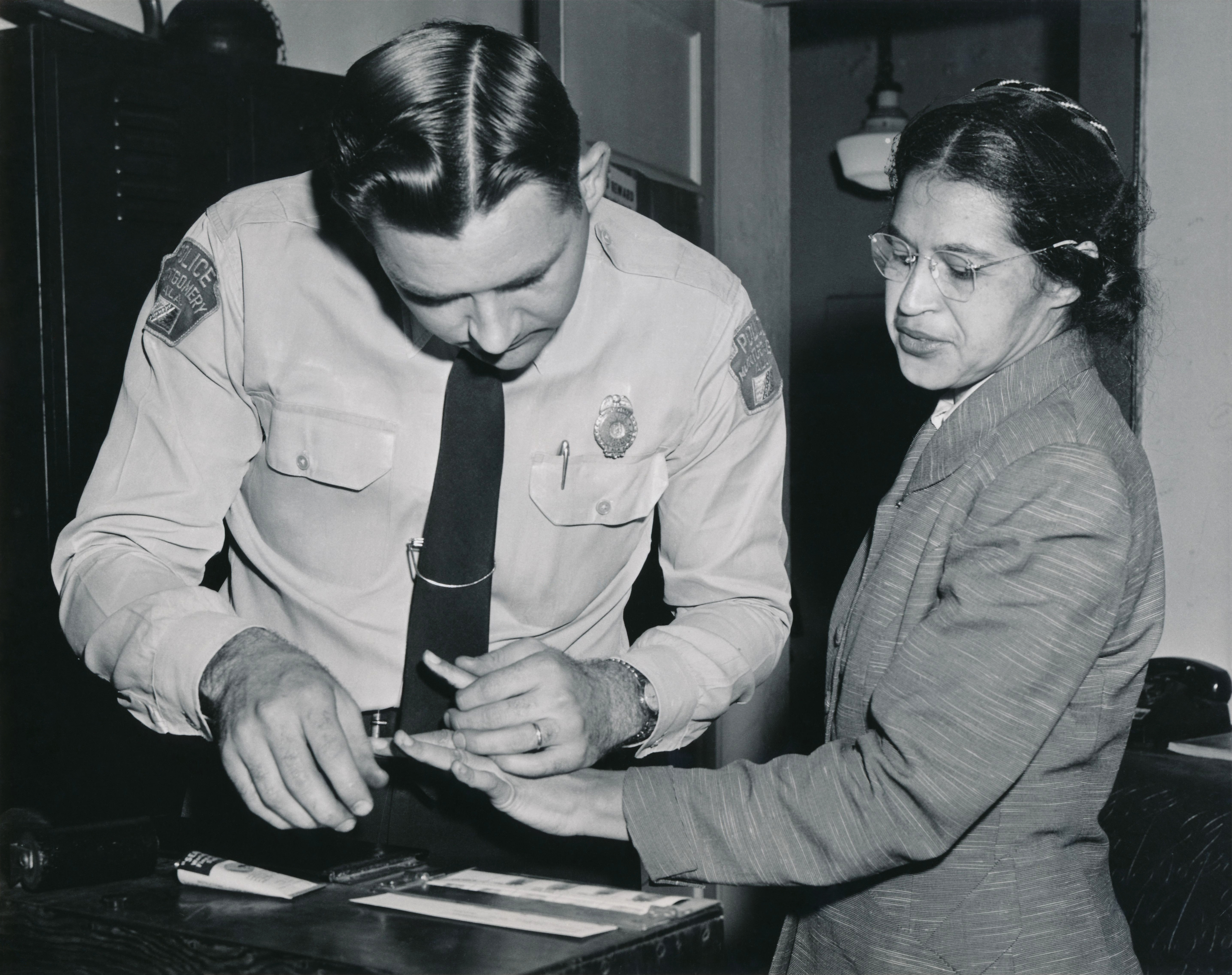
Rosa Parks being fingerprinted after being arrested for not giving up her seat on the bus so that a single white passenger could have an entire row of seats with no Black person sitting across the aisle

The 16th Street Baptist Church bombing marked a turning point during the civil rights era. On Sunday, September 15, 1963, with a stack of dynamite hidden on an outside staircase, Ku Klux Klansmen destroyed one side of the Birmingham church. The bomb exploded in proximity to twenty-six children who were preparing for choir practice in the basement assembly room. The explosion killed four Black girls, Carole Robertson (14), Cynthia Wesley (14), Denise McNair (11) and Addie Mae Collins (14).

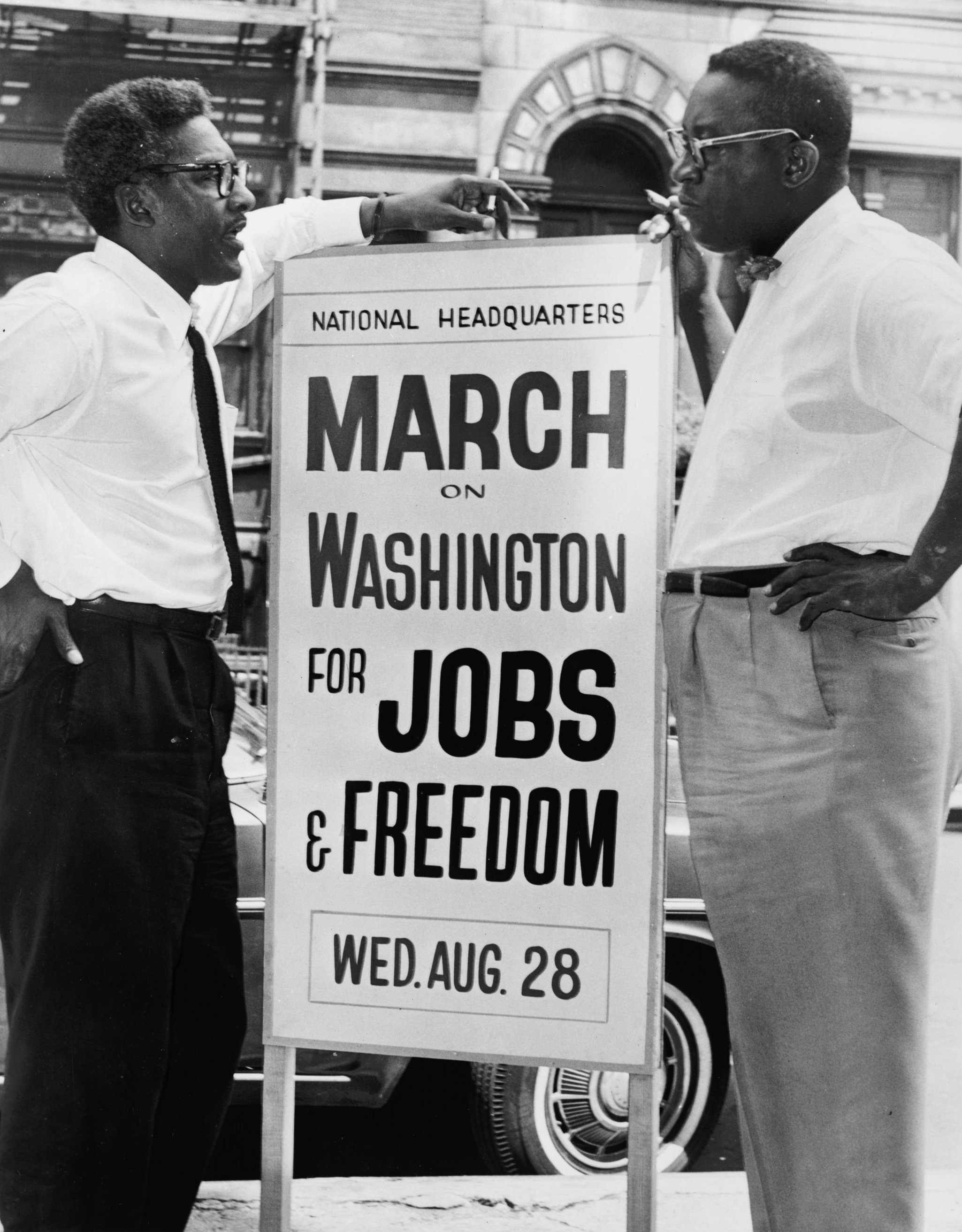
Bayard Rustin (left) and Cleveland Robinson (right), organizers of the March, on August 7, 1963

With the bombing occurring only a couple of weeks after Martin Luther King Jr.'s March on Washington for Jobs and Freedom, it became an integral aspect of transformed perceptions of conditions for Black people in America. It influenced the passage of the Civil Rights Act of 1964 (that banned discrimination in public accommodations, employment, and labor unions) and Voting Rights Act of 1965 which overruled remaining Jim Crow laws. Nonetheless, neither had been implemented by the end of the 1960s as civil rights leaders continued to strive for political and social freedom.

The first anti-miscegenation law was passed by the Maryland General Assembly in 1691, criminalizing interracial marriage. By the late 1800s, 38 US states had anti-miscegenation statutes, and by 1924 it was still in force in 29 states. In 1958, officers in Virginia entered the home of Richard and Mildred Loving and dragged them out of bed for living together as an interracial couple, on the basis that "any white person intermarry with a colored person"— or vice versa—each party "shall be guilty of a felony" and face prison terms of five years. The law was ruled unconstitutional in 1967 by the U.S. Supreme Court in Loving v. Virginia.

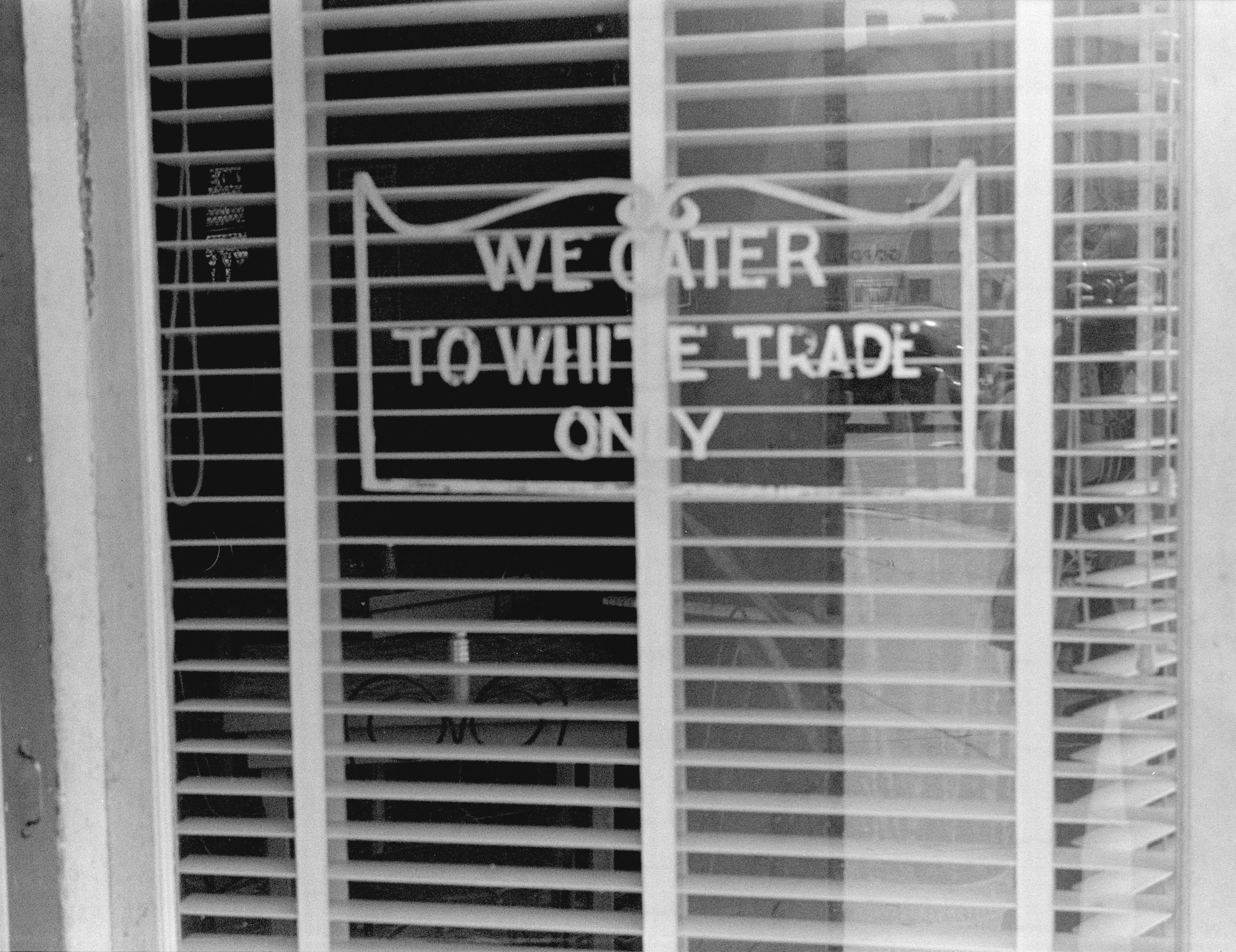
"We Cater to White Trade Only" sign on a restaurant window in Lancaster, Ohio in 1938. In 1964 Martin Luther King Jr. was arrested and spent a night in jail for attempting to eat at a White-only restaurant in St. Augustine, Florida.

Segregation continued even after the demise of the Jim Crow laws. Data on house prices and attitudes towards integration suggest that in the mid-20th century, segregation was a product of collective actions taken by Whites to exclude Black people from their neighborhoods. Segregation also took the form of redlining, the practice of denying or increasing the cost of services, such as banking, insurance, access to jobs, access to health care, or even supermarkets to residents in certain, often racially determined, areas. Although in the U.S. informal discrimination and segregation have always existed, redlining began with the National Housing Act of 1934, which established the Federal Housing Administration (FHA). The practice was fought first through passage of the Fair Housing Act of 1968 (which prevents redlining when the criteria for redlining are based on race, religion, gender, familial status, disability, or ethnic origin), and later through the Community Reinvestment Act of 1977, which requires banks to apply the same lending criteria in all communities. Although redlining is illegal some argue that it continues to exist in other forms.

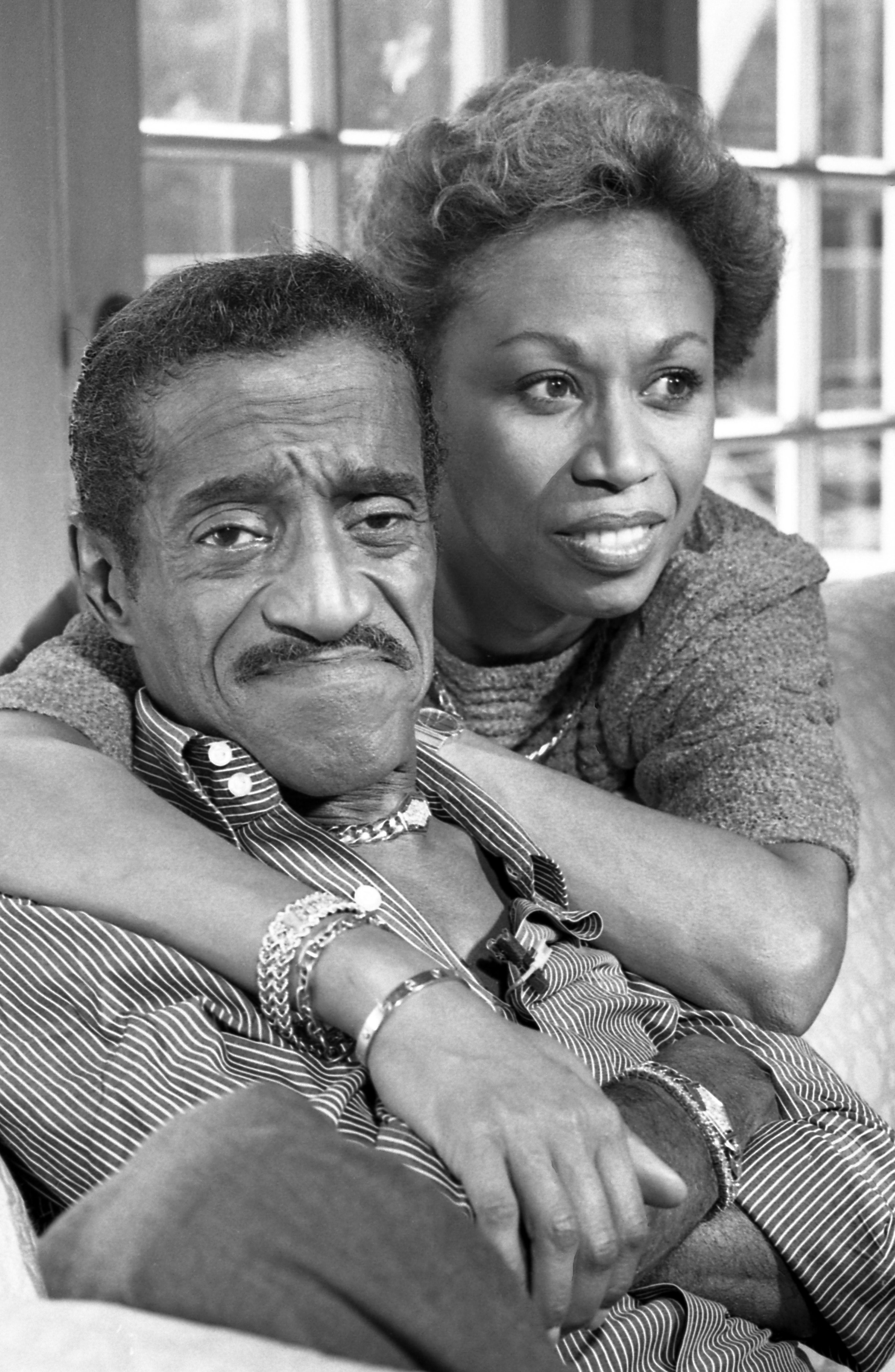
Although the ban on interracial marriage ended in California in 1948, entertainer Sammy Davis Jr. faced a backlash for his involvement with a White woman in 1957.

Up until the 1940s, the full revenue potential of what was called "the Negro market" was largely ignored by White-owned manufacturers in the U.S. with advertising focused on Whites. Black people were also denied commercial deals. On his decision to take part in exhibition races against racehorses in order to earn money, Olympic champion Jesse Owens stated, "People say that it was degrading for an Olympic champion to run against a horse, but what was I supposed to do? I had four gold medals, but you can't eat four gold medals." On the lack of opportunities, Owens added, "There was no television, no big advertising, no endorsements then. Not for a black man, anyway." In the reception to honor his Olympic success Owens was not permitted to enter through the main doors of the Waldorf Astoria New York and instead forced to travel up to the event in a freight elevator. The first Black Academy Award recipient Hattie McDaniel was not permitted to attend the premiere of Gone with the Wind with Georgia being racially segregated, and at the Oscars ceremony in Los Angeles she was required to sit at a segregated table at the far wall of the room; the hotel had a strict no-Blacks policy, but allowed McDaniel in as a favor. Her final wish to be buried in Hollywood Cemetery was denied because the graveyard was restricted to Whites only.

As the civil rights movement and the dismantling of Jim Crow laws in the 1950s and 1960s deepened existing racial tensions in much of the Southern U.S., a Republican Party electoral strategy—the Southern strategy—was enacted to increase political support among White voters in the South by appealing to racism against African Americans. Republican politicians such as presidential candidate Richard Nixon and Senator Barry Goldwater developed strategies that successfully contributed to the political realignment of many White, conservative voters in the South who had traditionally supported the Democratic Party rather than the Republican Party. In 1971, angered by African delegates at the UN siding against the U.S. in a vote to admit China and expel Taiwan, then Governor of California Ronald Reagan stated in a phone call to president Nixon, "To see those... those monkeys from those African countries – damn them, they're still uncomfortable wearing shoes!" Nixon adopted Reagan's offensive language to complain about "cannibals jumping up and down" after the vote passed. Recorded conversations from Nixon's time in office further revealed his bigoted views of minorities, commenting on African Americans: "I know they're not going to make it for 500 years. They aren't. You know it, too. The Mexicans are a different cup of tea. They have a heritage. At the present time they steal, they're dishonest, but they do have some concept of family life. They don't live like a bunch of dogs, which the Negroes do live like." The perception that the Republican Party had served as the "vehicle of white supremacy in the South", particularly post 1964, made it difficult for the Party to win back the support of Black voters in the South in later years.

In 1973, African American baseball legend Hank Aaron received hundreds of thousands of hate mail letters from fans, angry at him for trying to break the all-time homerun record at the time set by Babe Ruth. Aaron would eventually break Ruth's homerun record by hitting his 715th homerun on April 8, 1974. That same year, the U.S. Postal Service confirmed that Hank Aaron set the Guinness World Record for most mail received by any private citizen in one year, receiving over 900,000 letters with a third of them being letters of hate.

== From the 1980s to the 2000s ==
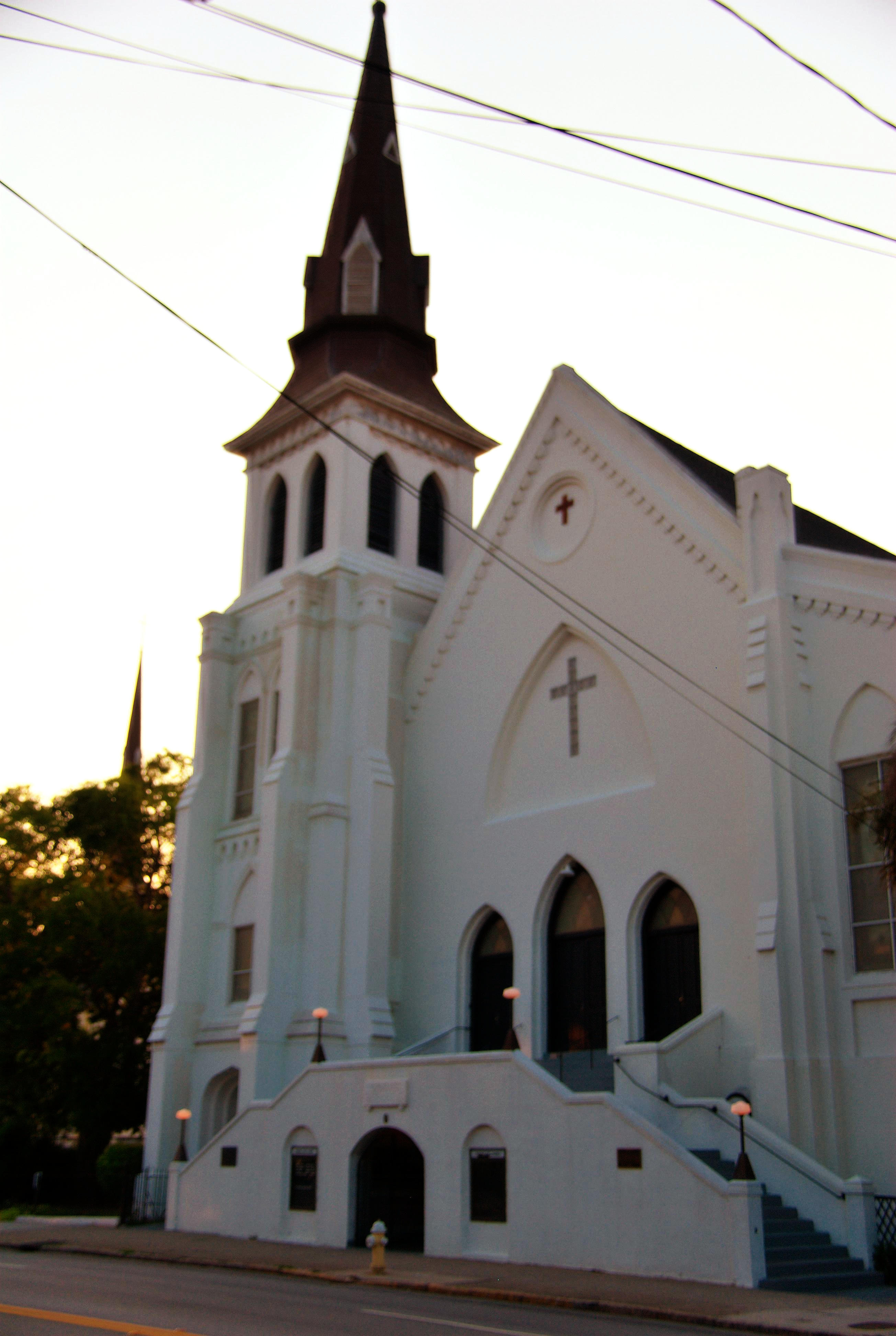
The Emanuel African Methodist Episcopal Church where nine Black church-goers, including the pastor, were killed by a White man in the 2015 Charleston church shooting. The church had been rebuilt after one of its co-founders, Denmark Vesey, was suspected of planning a slave rebellion in Charleston in 1822; 35 people, including Vesey, were hanged and the church was burned down.

While substantial gains were made in the succeeding decades through middle class advancement and public employment, Black poverty and lack of education continued in the context of de-industrialization. Despite gains made after the 16th Street Baptist Church bombing, some violence against Black churches has also continued—145 fires were set to churches around the South in the 1990s, and a mass shooting in Charleston, South Carolina was committed in 2015 at the historic Mother Emanuel Church.

From 1981 to 1997, the United States Department of Agriculture discriminated against tens of thousands of Black American farmers, denying loans that were provided to White farmers in similar circumstances. The discrimination was the subject of the Pigford v. Glickman lawsuit brought by members of the National Black Farmers Association, which resulted in two settlement agreements of $1.06 billion in 1999 and of $1.25 billion in 2009.

Numerous authors, academics, and historians have asserted that the war on drugs has been racially and politically motivated. As the crack epidemic spread across the country in the mid-1980s, Congress would pass the Anti-Drug Abuse Act of 1986. Under these sentencing guidelines, five grams of crack cocaine, often sold by and to African-Americans, carried a mandatory five-year prison sentence. However, for powder cocaine, often sold by and to White Americans, it would take one hundred times that amount, or 500 grams, for the same sentence, leading many to criticize the law as discriminatory. The 100:1 sentencing disparity was reduced to 18:1 in 2010 by the Fair Sentencing Act. According to the National Security Archive, during the 1980s, US officials, including Oliver North, collaborated with and protected known drug traffickers as part of efforts to fund the Central Intelligence Agency funded right-wing Contras in Nicaragua. In 1989, the Kerry Committee report concluded the Contra drug links included... "Payments to drug traffickers by the U.S. State Department of funds authorized by the Congress for humanitarian assistance to the Contras, in some cases after the traffickers had been indicted by federal law enforcement agencies on drug charges, in others while traffickers were under active investigation by these same agencies". In 1996, journalist Gary Webb wrote the Dark Alliance series for the San Jose Mercury News where he asserted that the CIA-backed Contras played a major role in the crack epidemic. The series caused outrage in the African-American community, particularly in South Central Los Angeles, where Congresswoman Maxine Waters served, and subsequently praised the series.

During the 1980s and 1990s, a number of riots occurred that were related to longstanding racial tensions between police and minority communities. The 1980 Miami riots were catalyzed by the killing of an African-American motorist by four White Miami-Dade Police officers. They were subsequently acquitted on charges of manslaughter and evidence tampering. Similarly, the six-day 1992 Los Angeles riots erupted after the acquittal of four White LAPD officers who had been filmed beating Rodney King, an African-American motorist. Khalil Gibran Muhammad, the Director of the Harlem-based Schomburg Center for Research in Black Culture has identified more than 100 instances of mass racial violence in the United States since 1935 and has noted that almost every instance was precipitated by a police incident.

=== Curriculum ===
The curriculum in U.S. schools has also contained racism against non-white Americans, including Native Americans, African Americans, Mexican Americans, and Asian Americans. Particularly during the 19th and early 20th centuries, school textbooks and other teaching materials emphasized the biological and social inferiority of Black Americans, consistently portraying Black people as simple, irresponsible, and oftentimes, in situations of suffering that were implied to be their fault (and not the effects of slavery and other oppression). Black Americans were also depicted as expendable and their suffering as commonplace, as evidenced by a poem about "Ten Little Nigger Boys" dying off one by one that was circulated as a children's counting exercise from 1875 to the mid-1900s. Historian Carter G. Woodson analyzed the American curriculum as completely lacking any mention of Black Americans' merits in the early 20th century. Based on his observations of the time, he wrote that American students, including Black students, who went through U.S. schooling would come out believing that Black people had no significant history and had contributed nothing to human civilization.

== From 2008 to the present ==
Some Americans saw the presidential candidacy of Barack Obama, who served as president of the United States from 2009 to 2017 and was the nation's first Black president, as a sign that the nation had entered a new, post-racial era. The election of President Donald Trump in 2016, who was a chief proponent of the racist birther movement in the U.S. (which argued that Obama was not born in the United States) and ran a racially tinged campaign, has been viewed by some commentators as a racist backlash against the election of Barack Obama. Both before and after the election, Trump's speeches and actions have widely been considered either racist or racially charged. During the mid-2010s, American society has been impacted by a resurgence of high levels of racism and discrimination. One new phenomenon has been the rise of the "alt-right" movement: a White nationalist coalition which advocates the expulsion of sexual and racial minorities from the United States. Since the mid-2010s, the Department of Homeland Security and the Federal Bureau of Investigation have identified White supremacist violence as the leading threat of domestic terrorism in the United States.

Many Americans cite the 2008 United States presidential election as a step forward in race relations: White Americans played a role in the election of Barack Obama, the country's first Black president. In fact, Obama received a greater percentage of the White vote (43%), than did the previous Democratic candidate, John Kerry (41%). Racial divisions persisted throughout the election; wide margins of Black voters gave Obama an edge during the presidential primary, where 8 out of 10 African-Americans voted for him in the primaries, and an MSNBC poll found that race was a key factor in whether a candidate was perceived as being ready for office. In South Carolina, for instance, "Whites were far likelier to name Clinton than Obama as being most qualified to be commander in chief, likeliest to unite the country and most apt to capture the White House in November. Black people named Obama over Clinton by even stronger margins—two- and three-to one—in all three areas."

In 2013, sociologist Russ Long stated that there is now a more subtle form of racism that associates a specific race with a specific characteristic. In a 1993 study conducted by Katz and Braly, it was presented that "blacks and whites hold a variety of stereotypes towards each other, often negative". The Katz and Braley study also found that African-Americans and Whites view the traits that they identify each other with as threatening, interracial communication between the two is likely to be "hesitant, reserved, and concealing". Interracial communication is guided by stereotypes; stereotypes are transferred into personality and character traits which then have an effect on communication. Multiple factors go into how stereotypes are established, such as age and the setting in which they are being applied. For example, in a study done by the Entman-Rojecki Index of Race and Media in 2014, 89% of Black women in movies are shown swearing and exhibiting offensive behavior while only 17% of White women are portrayed in this manner.

In 2012, Trayvon Martin, a seventeen-year-old teenager, was fatally shot by George Zimmerman in Sanford, Florida. Zimmerman, a neighborhood-watch volunteer, claimed that Martin was being suspicious and called the Sanford police to report him. While on the call to police, Zimmerman began following Martin. Between ending his call with police and their arrival, Zimmerman fatally shot Martin outside of the townhouse he was staying at following an altercation. Zimmerman was injured in the altercation and claimed self-defense. The incident caused national outrage after Zimmerman was not charged over the shooting. The national coverage of the incident lead Sandford police to arrest Zimmerman and charge him with second-degree murder, but he was found not guilty at trial. Public outcry followed the acquittal, leading to the creation of the Black Lives Matter movement.

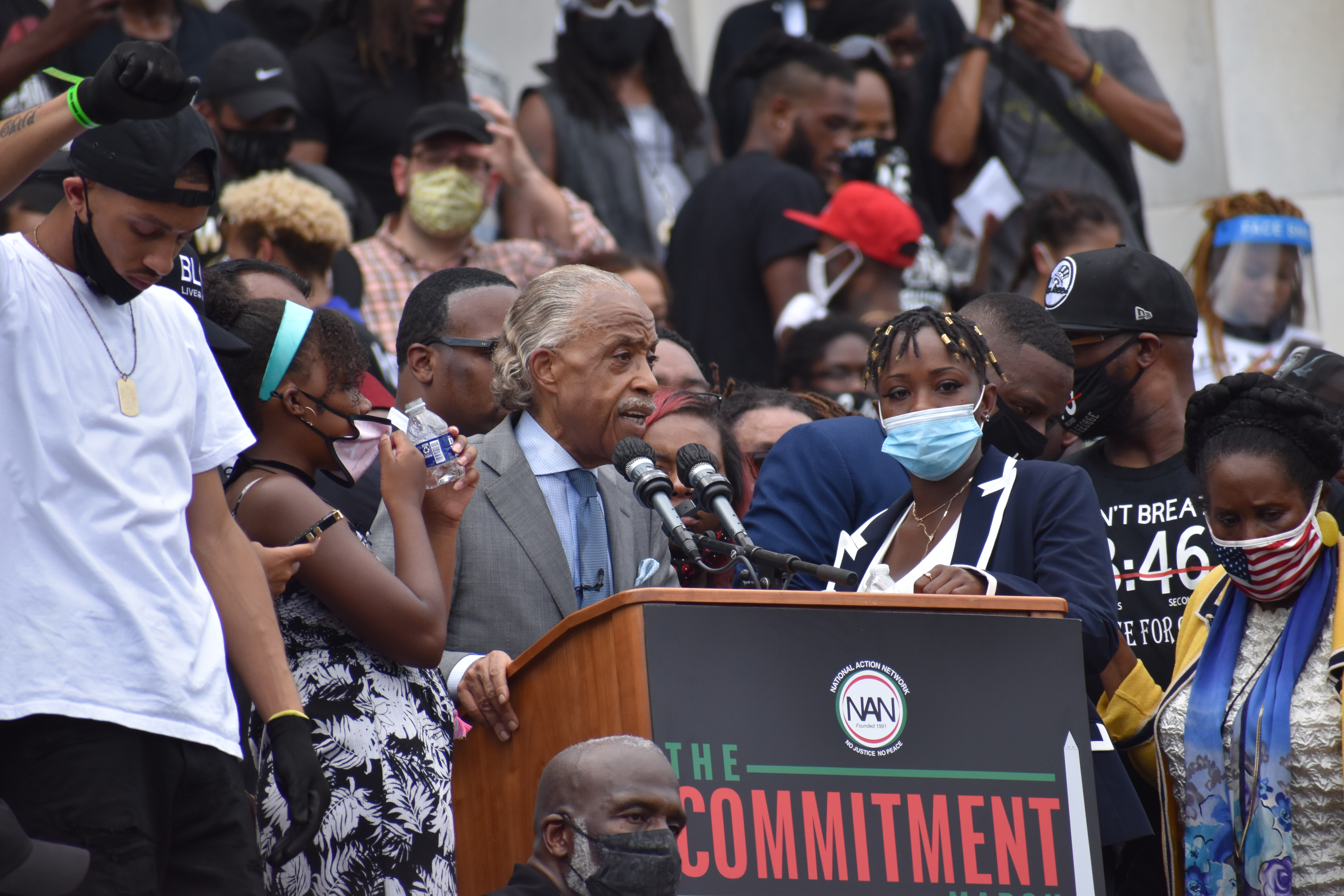
Reverend Al Sharpton speaking at the Commitment March: Get Your Knee Off Our Necks in August 2020

In 2014, the police shooting of Michael Brown, an African American, in Ferguson, Missouri led to widespread unrest in the town. In the years following, mass media has followed other high-profile police shootings of African-Americans, often with video evidence from police body-worn cameras. Amongst 15 high-profile police shooting deaths of African-Americans, only one officer faced prison time. The U.S. Justice Department launched the National Center for Building Community Trust and Justice in 2014. This program collects data concerning racial profiling to create change in the criminal justice system concerning implicit and explicit racial bias towards African-Americans as well as other minorities.

In August 2017, the UN Committee on the Elimination of Racial Discrimination issued a rare warning to the US and its leadership to "unequivocally and unconditionally" condemn racist speech and crime, following violence in Charlottesville during a rally organized by White nationalists, White supremacists, Klansmen, neo-Nazis and various right-wing militias in August.

On June 17, 2015, a white man killed nine people during a Bible study at Emanuel African Methodist Episcopal Church in Charleston, South Carolina. All victims were African Americans, including senior pastor and state senator Clementa C. Pinckney. The perpetrator later confessed that he committed the shooting in hopes of igniting a race war.

White women calling the police on Black people has become more publicized in recent years. In a 2020 article in The New York Times titled How White Women Use Themselves as Instruments of Terror, Black columnist Charles M. Blow wrote, "historically, White women have used the violence of White men and the institutions these men control as their own muscle. Untold numbers of lynchings were executed because White women had claimed that a black man raped, assaulted, talked to or glanced at them. This exercise in racial extremism has been dragged into the modern era through the weaponizing of 9-1-1, often by White women, to invoke the power and force of the police who they are fully aware are hostile to black men". White women in the U.S. who used their White privilege as a weapon have been given a different name over the centuries by Black people, with Karen a contemporary name. In May 2020, a White woman calling the police on a Black man bird-watching in Central Park, New York received wide publicity after it was caught on film. After he had asked her to put her dog on a leash (as per the rules in an area of the park to protect other wildlife), she approached him, to which he responded "Please don't come close to me", before she yelled, "I'm taking a picture and calling the cops. I'm going to tell them there's an African American man threatening my life." During her phone call, with the man standing a distance away from her and recording her, she spoke in an audibly distraught voice, "There's a man, African American, he is.. threatening me and my dog. Please send the cops immediately!". Other examples of White women calling the police on Black people include reporting an eight-year-old girl for selling bottles of water without a permit in San Francisco, reporting a Black family barbecuing in a park in Oakland, California, blocking a Black man from entering an apartment building in St. Louis, Missouri where he is a resident before calling the police, and a woman accusing a boy of groping her in a store in Brooklyn, New York, which was disproven by surveillance.

On May 25, 2020, George Floyd, a 46-year-old Black man, was murdered by a White Minneapolis Police Department officer, Derek Chauvin, who forced his knee on Floyd's neck for a total of 9 minutes and 29 seconds. (Note: The initial criminal complaint gave the duration as 8:46, which came to be often cited by protesters and the media. Prosecutors revised this about three weeks later to 7:46. In August, police body camera footage was publicly released, which showed the duration to be about 9:30.) All four police officers present were fired the next day, and later arrested. Chauvin was charged with and later convicted of second-degree murder, and the other three officers were charged with aiding and abetting second-degree murder. Floyd's murder sparked a wave of protests across the United States and worldwide.

A white male gunman who was identified as Payton S. Gendron of Conklin, New York shot and killed 10 black people in the 2022 Buffalo shooting. He believed that White Americans were being replaced by Black people.

In 2023, a white man shot and killed 3 black people inside a Dollar General in Jacksonville, Florida. He shot them to death with a Glock handgun and an AR-15 semi-automatic rifle. A swastika was painted on one of the guns.

According to a Gallup poll, 64% of Hispanics and 61% non-Hispanic Whites agree that racism against black individuals is prevalent and widespread in the United States.

African American expats have been moving to countries such as Thailand, the United Arab Emirates, Ghana, Portugal, South Africa, Costa Rica, Mexico and Colombia to escape the widespread anti-black racism in the United States. Many black people are relocating to Africa.

White supremacist GypsyCrusader is known for making anti-black remarks on Omegle.

President Donald Trump has criticized the Black Lives Matter movement.

== See also ==
- African-American history
- Afrophobia
- Negrophobia
- Black genocide in the United States – the notion that African Americans have been subjected to genocide throughout their history
- Discrimination based on skin color
- List of expulsions of African Americans
- List of lynching victims in the United States
- List of unarmed African Americans killed by law enforcement officers in the United States
- Anti-Chinese sentiment in the United States
- Anti-Japanese sentiment in the United States
- Racism against Native Americans in the United States
  - Native American genocide in the United States – the notion that Native Americans in the United States have been subjected to genocide throughout their history
- Anti-Mexican sentiment
- Anti-Romani sentiment
- Antisemitism in the United States
- The maid narratives
- White backlash#United States
- White flight#United States
- White nationalism#United States
  - White nationalism in the United States
- White privilege
- White supremacy#United States
  - White supremacy in the United States
