= Dean Richmond Babbitt =

American clergyman

Dean Richmond Babbitt (February 28, 1850 – July 21, 1905) was an American Episcopal clergyman and an activist for racial justice. He investigated the lynching of George White in Delaware in 1903 and challenged the views of John Temple Graves who argued that lynching was needed to protect white women and that the races needs to be separated.

== Early life ==
Babbitt was born in Ohio on February 28, 1850. His father, Hathaway B. Babbitt was a nephew of Dean Richmond, the president and builder of the New York Central railroad. His mother, Margaretta Bailey Babbitt was a sister of Dr. Gamaliel Bailey, an editor of the abolitionist paper, "The National Era". Stories about Bailey running afoul of anti-abolitionist groups contributed to Babbitt's interest in mobs.

As the start of his career, for a year, Babbitt was the editor of a newspaper in Murray, Kentucky where he also conducted a boys' school.

Before entering the ministry Babbitt studied law with Stanley Matthews in Cincinnati who later became a Supreme Court Justice. He practiced law for three years in Cincinnati where he was connected with Alphonso Taft whose son, Alphonso Taft, served as Secretary of War and Attorney General in the Grant administration.

== Education ==
Babbitt studied for two years at the Harvard College and then entered law school at the University of Cincinnati where he received the degree of L.L.B. After giving up the practice of law he studied for a B.D. from The Cambridge Episcopal Theological Seminary while completing his A.B. from Harvard. He completed both degrees in 1886. He received an LL.D. from the University of Wisconsin in 1888.

== Family ==
Babbitt married Adelaide Matilda Karrmann on September 13, 1882, They had six children

- Angelica Adelaide, September 29, 1883
- Hildegarde Margatetta, December 28, 1885
- Dean Richmond' July 10, 1888
- Gladys Richmond February 28, 1892
- Reginald Maurice May 21, 1894
- Marcella Adelaide April 28, 1899

His wife and all six children survived him.

== Career as a minister ==
After ordination by Bishop Henry C. Potter on July 4, 1886, Babbitt became the rector of St. John's Church in Milwaukee. He was appointed to the Board of Regents of the University of Wisconsin where he devoted himself to the reconstruction of the law department. In 1890 Babbitt became the rector of St. John's Church in Saginaw. He served there until 1893. Babbitt served as rector of Trinity Episcopal Church, Tacoma from 1893 to 1895. Tacoma Babbitt conducted a crusade against professional gamblers of the town, who gave him a warning to leave within 24 hours. He refused to leave.

Babbitt became Dean of All Saint's Cathedral in Spokane. In September 1897 the chapter voted to dismiss him. Reportedly Babbitt was a scholarly man but the chapter found him "temperamentally difficult". According to one report it was his advocacy of "Christian socialism" that alienated the chapter. Babbitt refused to vacate his study in the cathedral and left his assistant there on guard. Vestrymen resorted to force in order to eject him. The event was litigated both in civil court and before the bishop. Barred from the cathedral he held independent services for a while at Elks Temple.

Babbitt took over Christ Church in Newark, New Jersey in 1898. The church was heavily in debt. Babbitt was able to raise enough money to rescue it in less than a year. In October 1899 Babbitt was called to the Church of the Epiphany in Brooklyn. Again there were financial problems in where he tackled. The churches mortgage was wiped out on New Years 1903. Babbitt indicated that there was a check from a Mr. G. Tilliottson of $15,900. Some in the church recognized the hand of J. Pierpont Morgan in the gift. Other debts remained. Ultimately, shortly before his death in 1905, he arranged a merger between Epiphany and the nearby Church of St. Matthews.

== Civil Rights Activism ==
=== Chautauqua Conference ===
There was a Chautauqua conference titled "The Mob Spirit In America" in the summer of 1903 (August 10-August 15). Among the members of the "Mob Conference" were Babbitt and John Temple Graves. Graves's talk was titled "The Mob Spirit in The South" and Babbitt's talk was titled "Lynching and Mobs From a National Standpoint".

Graves defended lynching as necessary to protect white women from being raped. "Ultimately he concludes that the only real viable solution is the separation of the races.

In the interim discussion Babbitt challenged Graves. He asked whether in the mobs of the South whether there was a homicidal tendency - a desire for excitement, the breaking of monotony, the primitive savage lust for blood. Babbitt also doubted that the broad-minded sympathetic men and women of the South share Graves's approval of the lynching spirit.

After the discussion Babbitt gave his speech. Babbitt argued that torturing rapists was not a good form of chivalry and that Black women are also victims. Babbitt did not accept Graves as being representative of the South in his call for separation of the races noting that Blacks have the same right of occupancy in America as whites. He also notes that lynching has been used in the case of suspicion of crimes other than rape some quite petty.

The talk than shifts to the recent lynching of George White referred to as "The Wilmington Case". Babbitt visited Wilmington shortly after the lynching. He describes the detailed investigation he performed. He concludes that the lynching could have been prevented by the authorities given the forewarning they received. There were adequate police and guards to have prevented White being seized by the mob. The makeup of the mob did not include "representative respectable citizens". He attributes much blame to a sermon given that encouraged the mob formation. There was a subsequent coverup by officials. He also noted subsequent incidents in Wilmington indicating an increase in racial tension.

Babbitt indicated that the Graves speech the previous day had been already publicized and threatened to encourage mob violence.

=== Negro Baptist Convention ===
Babbitt shared the platform with Booker T. Washington at the Negro Baptist Convention held in the National Exposition Building in Philadelphia in September 1903. In his speech Babbitt suggested that the spread of Blacks to the North and West would result in general uplift in the different and better industrial conditions of the North.

=== National Sociological Society ===
The National Sociological Society was a short lived organization of African Americans and whites, Northerners and Southerners, academic men, politicians, clergymen and other. It was founded by Jesse Lawson. NSS convened a single conference in 1903 in response to Booker T. Washington's call for a national conference on race relations. The proceedings of the conference were published.

Babbitt addressed the conference on November 10, 1903. His speech was titled "The Psychology of Race Prejudice". He started off by celebrating the fact that a biracial convention could meet to consider issues of racism, comparing that to the previous generation when Charles Sumner was caned in the Senate and Dr. Gamaliel Bailey, proprietor of an anti-slavery paper, had his house surrounded by a mob. He acknowledges that virulent race prejudice is still widespread, but is thankful for the abolition of slavery and the suppression of Ku-Klux-Klan.

Babbitt viewed race prejudice as something that has existed in some degree throughout human history and as something likely to continue to exist. He notes a variety of race based prejudices besides that between the "Negro and Anglo-Saxon in the United States. Babbitt notes the bewilderment of the North at the storm of race prejudice generated by Booker T. Washington's visit to President Roosevelt in the White House in 1901. Babbitt saw the incident as a revealing flash showing the depth of race prejudice in the South.

In Babbitt's view race prejudice has its basis in a "race instinct" that has the beneficent purpose of race conservation and race integrity. Each race has its own "precious endowments" and racial instinct if God-given to preserve them. He sees the benign instinct, however, as widely different from the race prejudice evidenced against Blacks in the United States.

The worst manifestation, he sees of the race prejudice is in mobs, particularly lynching mobs. He sees the mob as something that has a mind of its own that is not the aggregate of the mental acts of its individual members. As a mere crowd evolves into a mob individuals become capable of acts that they would not do on their own. The mob is vulnerable to the power of suggestion. Babbitt uses illustrations from the recent lynching of George White to show the transition from crowd to mob.

Babbitt notes how extreme racism is in the United States, "No such racial conditions as exist in this land can be found anywhere on this globe." Looking back at history Babbitt states that the Black man has the same right of occupancy in the continent as does the white noting that the first enslaved Africans arrived in 1619 a year before the Mayflower. He notes the approval that the ultra school represented by John Temple Graves approves of lynching for certain crimes. Babbitt discussed at length the connection between he crime of rape and lynching noting that sexual assaults on Black women by white men do not draw out the same reaction.

Babbitt's suggested remedies for race prejudice were:

1. A national education bill to provide better schools for both poor whites and Blacks.
2. Charitable efforts to spread Black people out over the country
3. Emphasis in uplift should be on character rather than intellectual achievement without neglecting the latte
4. Just, equitable and unfaltering administration of laws to white and Black alike
5. Application of humane principles of Christianity
6. Earnest effort of Blacks to bring Black offenders to speedy justice
7. Systematic organization of Blacks in their own interest

In later discussions, Babbitt suggested that a commission be appointed by the conference consisting of "six special students of the Negro problem" three white and three Black. Babbitt is listed as one of the members of the Permanent Commission on American Race Problems.

=== Arena Article ===
In 1904 an article by Babbitt on the psychology of the lynching mob was published in the Arena, a progressive journal. Babbitt traces how a crowd develops into a mob, an entity with a mind. He uses elements of the lynching of George White to illustrate the process.

== Death ==
Before his death on July 21, 1905, Babbitt had been in poor health for over a year. He underwent surgery for cancer of the liver. Three weeks before his death he was prostrated with malarial fever and confined to his bed.
