= Henry H. Harrison =

Member of Mississippi House of Representatives

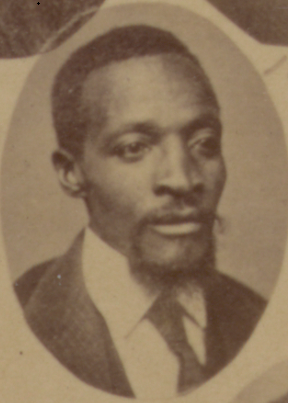

Henry H. Harrison was a minister, shoemaker, teacher, and state legislator in Mississippi. He represented Chickasaw County, Mississippi in the Mississippi House of Representatives from 1874 to 1875.

He was born in Alabama. He married and had seven children. His fellow legislator from Chickasaw County was George White in the House. Nathan Shirley and F. H. Little served in the Mississippi Senate.

== See also ==
- African American officeholders from the end of the Civil War until before 1900
