= J. W. Shattuck =

American politician

J. W. Shattuck was a state legislator in Mississippi. He represented Wilkinson County, Mississippi in the Mississippi House of Representatives from 1874 to 1877.

He published a newspaper.

He and Samuel Riley represented Wilkinson County in the Mississippi House in 1874 while George W. White represented the county in the state senate.
