= Samuel Riley =

American politician

Samuel Riley was an American state legislator in Mississippi. He represented Wilkinson County, Mississippi in the Mississippi House of Representatives from 1876 to 1878. He served with fellow Wilkinson County representative J. W. Shattuck.
