= OmeTV =

Video chat application

- Developers: Bad Kitty’s Dad, LDA
- Platform: iOS, Android, Web browser
- Type: Video chat
- License: Freeware
- Website: ometv.com

OmeTV is a video chat app and website that connects users with strangers. The service lets people talk using live video or text chat. It is owned by Bad Kitty’s Dad, LDA, a company based in Portugal. The platform is an alternative to Omegle, which closed down in 2023.

== Features ==
OmeTV pairs two people for a face-to-face video call. The app matches users randomly with people from around the world. If a user does not want to talk to their current match, they can swipe or click to skip to the next person. The service works on mobile phones and web browsers. Before it was removed from some stores, it was the 11th most downloaded app on the Apple App Store in Australia.

== Safety and privacy ==
Users can stay anonymous while chatting on the platform. Because the app connects strangers at random, Australian police warned that it creates safety risks. These risks include seeing inappropriate content or meeting dangerous people. The app uses a checkbox to check a user's age, but critics say this is easy to bypass.

In 2025, Australian officials stated that the app was used for grooming and sexual exploitation. The eSafety Commissioner in Australia sent a formal warning to the app's owner in August 2025. The warning said the app did not have enough safety tools to protect children from contacting adults.

== Regulation ==
The parent company did not reply to the warning from the eSafety Commissioner. In October 2025, Apple and Google removed OmeTV from their app stores in Australia. The removal happened after reports that predators used the app to target children. Even after the app store ban, the website remained online. The company faced possible fines of up to $49.5 million for breaking Australian safety laws.
