= George White (preacher) =

American preacher and historian

Rev. George White (March 12, 1802 – April 30, 1887) was an Episcopalian preacher, amateur historian, and archaeologist in Georgia, United States. In 1849 he published Statistics of the State of Georgia: Including an Account of Its Natural, Civil, and Ecclesiastical History Together with a Particular Description of Each County, Notices of the Manners and Customs of Its Aboriginal Tribes, and a Correct Map of the State. His book entitled Historical Collections of Georgia: Containing the Most Interesting Facts, Traditions, Biographical Sketches, Etc., Relating to Its History and Antiquities, from Its First Settlement to the Present Time, has been widely referenced by scholars working with Georgia history since its publication in 1854.
