= Nathan Shirley =

Mississippi state legislator

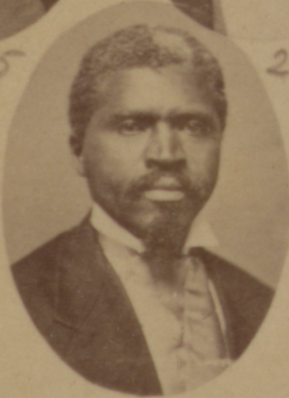

Nathan Shirley was a state legislator in Mississippi.

He served in the Mississippi Senate from 1874 to 1879. He served as a constable in Chickasaw County

The results of a state senate election between him and J. F. Griffin were disputed.

He served with F. H. Little and the R. O. Reynolds from Chickasaw County. He was succeeded by J. T. Griffin.

== See also ==
- African American officeholders from the end of the Civil War until before 1900
