= George White (footballer, born 1892) =

Australian rules footballer

Personal information
- Full name: George Stephen White
- Born: 23 December 1892; Carlton, Victoria
- Died: 29 September 1953 (aged 60); Carlton, Victoria
- Original team: Coburg (VFA)

Playing career^{1}
Years	Club	Games (Goals)
1916–19	Carlton	11 (0)
- ^{1} Playing statistics correct to the end of 1919.

George Stephen White (23 December 1892 – 29 September 1953) was an Australian rules footballer who played with Carlton in the Victorian Football League (VFL).
