= Omegle =

Randomized online chat website (2009–2023)

- Website type: Online chat; Voice chat; Video chat
- Available in: English
- Founded: March 25, 2009
- Dissolved: November 8, 2023
- Country of origin: United States
- Owners: Omegle.com, LLC
- Creator: Leif K-Brooks
- Industry: Internet
- Website: omegle.com
- Commercial: No
- Registration: No
- Current status: Defunct

Omegle (/oʊˈmɛɡəl/ oh-MEG-əl) was a free, web-based online chat service started by Leif K-Brooks in 2009 and ended services in 2023 due to a lack of safety for children. The website allowed users to socialize with others without the need to register, and it would randomly pair users in one-on-one chat sessions where they could chat together.

== History ==
The site was created by then-18-year-old Leif K-Brooks of Brattleboro, Vermont and was launched in March 2009. Less than a month after launch, Omegle garnered around 150,000 page views per day. In March 2010, the site introduced a videotelephony feature. In 2022, the rules were updated so that only those 18 or older were allowed to use the website; previously the site allowed users under 18 so long as they were 13 years old at minimum and obtained prior parental consent to use Omegle.

Omegle criticized the Chinese Communist Party, expressed support for the 2019–20 Hong Kong protests, and added an image of the American flag on the front page with the words "Xi Jinping sure looks like Winnie-the-Pooh" over it.

=== Closure ===
At the time of its closure, Omegle faced a $22 million lawsuit, which was filed in 2019 by a person identified as "A.M." from Oregon who became a victim of child sex exploitation. In 2014, the then-11-year-old plaintiff encountered a Canadian pedophile on Omegle, who blackmailed her into digital sexual slavery. The lawsuit alleged that Omegle knowingly allowed the pairing of minors with pedophiles due to a splash screen warning that stated, "Predators have been known to use Omegle, so please be careful". Omegle removed this warning at a later date. The BBC published an extensive report on the role of a lawsuit and out-of-court settlement that resulted in shutting down the site. The plaintiff was mentioned in Omegle's final site message saying, "I thank A.M. for opening my eyes to the human cost of Omegle." This acknowledgment and a link to the lawsuit was part of the site's settlement agreement. On November 8, 2023, K-Brooks posted an announcement describing the challenges of running the site and the ultimate decision to shut down the website. Challenges listed included online exploitation of children and attacks on communication services. K-Brooks concluded that his decision revolved around internet misuse and asked users to consider donating to the Electronic Frontier Foundation to support internet users' digital rights. The lead of the announcement began with quotes by C. S. Lewis and Douglas Adams.

=== Etymology ===
Brooks said, "I was working on a different project before Omegle, and it kept breaking due to an error from a third-party service it used. The error code wasn't documented, and I wanted a name for it, so I nicknamed it 'error code omega' because it was apocalyptic. Omegle was eventually named after that."

== Controversies ==
=== Racism amongst some users ===
During the COVID-19 pandemic, Omegle was used by many alt-right users for racist content, in which users harassed ethnic minorities and women with hate speech. In 2020, two then-college students named Hidaya Saban and Alees Elshiek used the keywords "BLM", "KKK" and "racist" to match with users, reporting that many of their matches made racist remarks. In 2020, TikTok user Johan Bradley posted a video of two teenage boys referring to him as a "nigger" and "slave" while making whipping noises. The Omegle users were identified as students of Shoreham-Wading River High School, prompting their district's superintendent to launch disciplinary action against them. In 2020, the Anti-Defamation League began an investigation into antisemitism and far-right trolling on Omegle. An Australian white supremacist and former YouTuber named Tor Brookes (who used the alias Philip Hedley on Omegle but is more generally known as "CatboyKami") popularised the site in far-right circles after he attended a "Stop the Steal" rally in Phoenix, Arizona. He has promoted conspiracy theories and far-right extremism on Omegle, as well as on BitChute, Discord, and Telegram, such as a video of him mimicking the murder of George Floyd. His content includes racial slurs and costumes (including blackface) to mock other ethnic groups. Other prominent white supremacists that used Omegle included American Paul Miller, who used the alias GypsyCrusader and dressed as the comic book villains Joker and Riddler to spread racist messages, and Canadian Brandon Martinez, who would enter interests associated with the Democratic Party to harass leftist users.

=== Child sexual abuse ===
In 2010, K-Brooks expressed disappointment over sexual content on the site. While video chats were monitored to flag the IP addresses of users that showed nudity or sexual content, Omegle did not have a broadcast delay to prevent minors from viewing harmful material at the beginning of a chat. Prior to early 2013, the site did not censor contributions through a profanity filter, and users often encountered nudity and sexual content. A former user who was a child at the time reported, after it closed, her experiences with the site, saying "So. Many. Penises." and mentioning people self-harming.

Many local and state law enforcement agencies warned of increasing sexual exploitation of minors when Omegle's popularity surged, particularly with teenagers, during the COVID-19 lockdowns.

In 2020, a Canadian teacher was arrested at his home in Guelph after he broadcast child pornography on Omegle. He pleaded guilty to several criminal charges in 2022. In 2021, an Australian man was arrested at his home on the Central Coast of New South Wales after he allegedly used Omegle to advertise his search for child sex.

In August 2025, Norwegian authorities charged a man in his 30s with sexually abusing more than 30 children aged about 8 to 12 via Omegle and other video-chat platforms, including alleged rape.

== See also ==
- Chatroulette
- OmeTV
- Online predator
- Stickam
