= George White (Mississippi politician) =

American politician

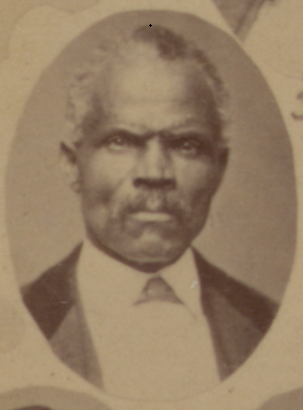

George White was an American state legislator in Mississippi. He represented Chickasaw County, Mississippi in the Mississippi House of Representatives in 1874 and 1875.

He served with fellow House member from Chickasaw County Henry H. Harrison.

== See also ==
- African American officeholders from the end of the Civil War until before 1900
