= Lynching of George White =

1903 murder of African American man in Delaware

- Portrait of George White
- Location: Wilmington, Delaware, U.S.
- Date: June 23, 1903; 123 years ago
- Target: George F. White
- Attack type: Murder by immolation, lynching, torture murder, racial terrorism, extrajudicial killing, mutilation, dismemberment, bludgeoning, hate crime
- Victims: George F. White, aged 24
- Perpetrators: Mob of white residents in Wilmington, Delaware
- Motive: Anti-black racism, retaliation against White for being accused of the murder of Helen Bishop

The lynching of George White occurred on Tuesday, June 23, 1903, in Wilmington, Delaware. White was a black farmer accused of the rape and murder of Helen Bishop who was arrested and brought to the town's workhouse. On the evening of June 22, under the impression that the local authorities were not reacting severely or soon enough, a large mob of white men marched to the workhouse, broke their way in, and forced White out of his cell. He was then brought to the site of Helen Bishop's death, tied to a stake, and burned. It is often referred to as the only documented lynching in Delaware.

== Background ==
=== National social climate ===
The late 19th and early 20th centuries were times of high racial tension in the United States. This also coincided with a national pattern of racial violence. Between the years 1882 and 1921, the United States experienced more than 3,405 lynchings. Most of these victims were black men, but women and children were also targeted. These events were sometimes referred to as "unofficial executions." In 1903 specifically, there was a wave of lynchings across the midwest, including events in Evansville, Indiana; Springfield, Ohio; and Belleville and Danville, Illinois.

=== Local social climate ===
In his documentary "In the Dead Fire's Ashes," Stephen Labovsky describes the town of Wilmington as "North of the South but South of the North." This is because of its position as a border state during and after the U.S. Civil War. Scholar Michael J. Pfeifer describes this contradiction, saying "If the area's commercial interests were more aligned with... the industrial North, the state's social politics continued to reflect a Jim Crow orientation on matters of race and rights."

== Events ==
=== Murder of Helen Bishop ===
On June 15, 1903, 18-year-old Helen Bishop was assaulted on her way home from Wilmington High School. Helen was the daughter of a Rev. Bishop. She was found unconscious at around 5 pm near Price's Corner, west of Wilmington, by a man and his daughter. Her appearance was described as "soiled and torn," and she had wounds on her body, most significantly on her neck. Bishop was taken to her home immediately, but died the following afternoon, never having woken up.

=== Town reactions ===
Soon after Helen Bishop was found, George White was arrested. Though he did not resist arrest, he did deny the charges. The evidence was circumstantial. White, who had two previous arrests, was described as a 24-year-old laborer who was 5'9" and weighed 160 pounds. George Segars reported a man of that description running after Helen, who looked like she was rushing home. Two black women also mentioned seeing him walking behind Bishop that morning.

That afternoon, hundreds of people attended Helen Bishop's funeral. On June 21, 1903, a crowd of 3,000 gathered at the Olivet Presbyterian Church to hear Reverend Robert Elwood speak on the topic that he had advertised in the newspaper as "Should the Murderer of Miss Bishop Be Lynched?" Elwood spoke on the importance of quickly resolving the issue, and encouraged officials to take care of it before the citizens were forced to. Further agitating the crowd, Elwood brought out a container of leaves supposedly stained in Helen Bishop's blood.

=== Lynching ===
The following evening, June 22, several hundred men and boys gathered and marched to the town's workhouse, where White was being held. Outnumbering the guards, they stormed their way into the building and forced the guards to take White out of his cell. Many people were injured and the mob caused $400 in damage. They then brought White to Price's Corner, where Helen Bishop had been attacked. Between 4,000 and 5,000 bystanders showed up to witness White being lynched.

Some of the men in the mob tied White to a stake and put straw at his feet. While tied up, White reportedly admitted to the charges. Extra straw was added at his feet and a fire was lit. White escaped his bonds multiple times, jumping out of the fire only to be pushed back in. The third time he ran out, a member of the mob cut off his right foot, and another hit him in the head with a piece of a fence.

Afterwards, it was reported that many men shot their revolvers into the ashes on the ground, and others picked through the ashes to bring home souvenirs. His foot and skull were at one point displayed in the window of a store in town. The coroner who went to the site found a note allegedly from White, confessing to the crimes. It was covered in the same oil used to start the fire.

== Aftermath ==
=== Media coverage and public opinion ===
The lynching of George White was covered extensively not just in Delaware, but around the country. Many papers wrote editorials on the subject, including the Chicago Tribune, Washington Post, and St. Louis Post-Dispatch. Other pieces published pictures from the event, and printed gruesome details, quotes by those who had witnessed it, and the transcript of White's supposed confession:

"I was sent by Mr. Woodward down to the cornfield to thin some corn, and I saw Mr. Woodward's daughter and intended to rape her, but a couple of men came along in a wagon and I didn't. Then I saw the Bishop girl and I followed her... I chocked her and accomplished my purpose. Then I asked her if she was going to tell on me, and she said she was. Then I gave her a hack in the throat with my knife...Then I went back to the house and put on a light hat instead of the cap I wore. You would not do this to me if I was a white man and did this."

Most papers reported from a position that either sympathized with White, or that sympathized with the lynch mob. African American publications tended to land somewhere in the middle, being careful to show their displeasure with the mob and its actions while still condemning the actions of George White, assuming he was guilty.

Cardinal James Gibbons mentioned the case in an article for the North American Review where he condemned lynching.

=== Local opinion ===
The town of Wilmington had two daily newspapers: the Morning News and the Evening Journal. Both were understanding of the town people's frustration with officials for not acting quickly enough, but they disapproved of the mob's violence. Neither paper mentioned the names of community members who were members of the mob.

Helen Bishop's father was opposed to the lynching of George White, and had asked the town not to act illegally. Papers also received letters from the public. Many people said that the mob members were local heroes and applauded their bravery. The Morning News reported that the participants in the lynching believed "the job was done all right" and that "women will be safe now."

Others worried what would happen to the country if individuals were allowed to take justice into their own hands. One example of this is Delaware resident Thomas F. Bayard, who said:

"The action of the mob last night is a disgrace to the state. This is, and always has been, a law abiding community, and there never has been any question in the minds of those who chose to stop and think that exact justice would be meted out to all lawbreakers no matter how heinous the crime."

=== Legal action ===
After the lynching, some people tried to determine who had been involved. The town described the "Avenging Cowboy," an unknown man on horseback, as the main leader of the mob. Arthur Cornell of Baltimore was at one point arrested as the Avenging Cowboy. His request for bail was initially denied. Crowds began to gather and quickly turned violent when the mayor didn't respond to their demands to let Cornell go. He was eventually let out on bail, but the crowd did not disappear, and a number of men began attacking black people around the town.

== Modern mentions ==
=== In the Dead Fire's Ashes ===
In the Dead Fire's Ashes is a 40-minute documentary produced in 2004 by Stephen Labovsky. It was funded by the Delaware Humanities Council. The film consists of interviews with historians, reenactments, old photographs, and voiceover.

=== Memorial plaque ===
On June 23, 2019, the George White Commemorative Historic Marker was unveiled in Greenbank Park by the Delaware Social Justice Remembrance Coalition. It marked the 116th anniversary of George White's lynching. That same year in early August, the marker was stolen. A replacement marker, partially funded by citizens of the town, was unveiled on October 20, 2019.

== See also ==
- False accusations of rape as justification for lynchings
