= GypsyCrusader =

American Internet personality (born 1988)

Paul Miller
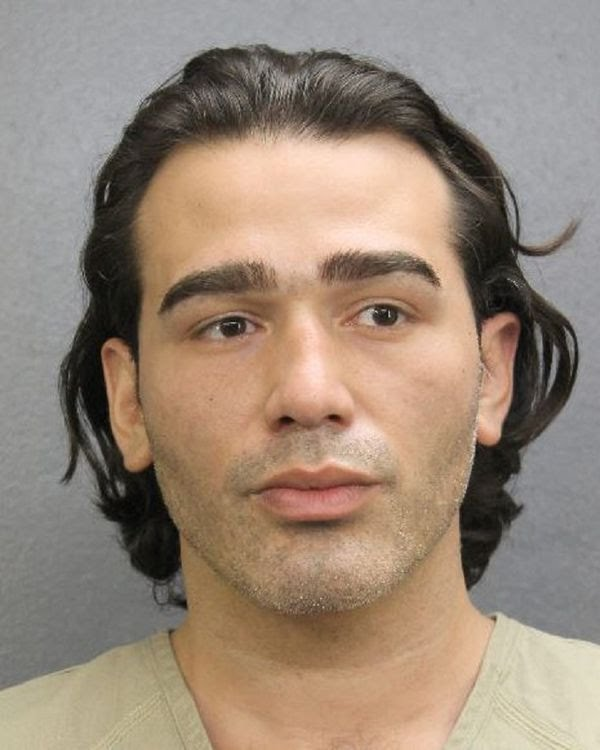
- 2021 mugshot of Miller
- Born: Paul Nicholas Miller; August 11, 1988 (age 38); New York, U.S.
- Other names: GypsyCrusader; Gypsy; Real Life Joker; Right Wing Riddler; (online pseudonyms)
- Occupations: Political commentator; activist; Muay Thai fighter and trainer
- Known for: Far-right internet commentary and cosplay-based livestreams
- Movement: Far-right; American conservatism (formerly)

Paul Nicholas Miller (born August 11, 1988), better known as GypsyCrusader, (Note: Alternatively known as Gypsy Crusader, Gypsycrusader or Gypsy.) is an American-Romani white supremacist Internet personality and Muay Thai fighter of Romani ancestry. Described as homophobic, antisemitic, and racist by various advocacy groups and the United States Department of Justice, he frequently live streams himself cosplaying as various contemporary popular culture personas. Miller is a former journalist and Muay Thai trainer.

In June 2021, Miller pleaded guilty to charges related to unlawful possession of a firearm and ammunition, leading to a 41-month-long imprisonment. He is known to have cosplayed as the Joker, the Riddler, Mario, (Note: Miller often names his characters, e.g., Real Life Joker, Right Wing Riddler, and Racist Mario.) and others, while video chatting with strangers on the now-defunct website Omegle and other lesser-known video chat websites. He is known for his advocacy for a race war, espousing white supremacy, and neo-Nazism. He has been tied to multiple alt-right and far-right organizations, including the Proud Boys and the boogaloo movement.

== Early life ==
Paul Nicholas Miller was born on August 11, 1988, in New York. He is of Romani ancestry.

== Fighting career ==
Miller began training in Muay Thai in 2008 at the age of 20. After just three months of training, he made his amateur debut later that same year. During his early career, he trained with Weapons 9 Muay Thai before later joining The Institute. Over time, Miller captured both the Regional Light Heavyweight Championship and the U.S. National Championship under the World Kickboxing Association (WKA).

On April 4, 2014, Miller challenged Andrew Ball for the WKA World Championship but was defeated by technical knockout in the second round. Following a career-altering car accident, Miller transitioned away from active competition and began working as a trainer and coach, including at The Institute.

On February 28, 2026, Brand Risk Promotions announced a bout between Miller and rapper DeWayne D. Stevenson—better known as Supah Hot Fire—as the co-main event of "Brand Risk Promotions Event 13". The fight took place on March 14, 2026, in Miami, Florida, with Miller winning by split decision (2–1).

Miller was scheduled to face Israeli influencer King Azoulay at Duel: Arena, an event promoted by Duel.com. The bout took place at the Kia Center on August 29, 2026, in Orlando, Florida, with Miller winning by split decision (2–1). Supporters of Miller in the crowd held up a Nazi flag and performed Nazi salutes, which was condemned by Orlando/Florida politicians such as Rick Scott, Anna Eskamani and Buddy Dyer. Miller also performed Nazi salutes after the final bell rung and made antisemitic comments about Azoulay during his post-fight speech.

Miller has stated that his belief in Jesus Christ helps him get through his boxing matches.

== Views and online activity ==
Miller's political involvement began on behalf of Roma communities in America and Europe while becoming active as a Republican, according to NJ Spotlight News. Miller began branding himself as a "conservative, confrontational journalist" on YouTube.

Miller came to the national spotlight in October 2018 following an altercation with anti-fascist protesters outside of an event in New York's Upper East Side where Proud Boys founder Gavin McInnes was speaking. Miller was attacked by the group, who he states attempted to kill him via punching, stomping and kicking him. The confrontation resulted in an interview with One American News Network (OANN) and Miller being framed as a "courageous victim" on right-wing encrypted platforms like Telegram. According to NJ Spotlight News, Miller described this event as the moment he became "radicalized".

=== Far-right activity ===
He often expresses his hatred towards racial minorities, fat people, and heavily opposes immigration. Miller also calls for a "race war" and is a conspiracy theorist who supports the "Day of the Rope", a white supremacist slogan that references William Luther Pierce's 1978 book The Turner Diaries. In the novel, white supremacists take control of California and engage in mass lynchings of anyone perceived as a "race traitor"; these include journalists, politicians, and white people in interracial relationships. The day on which these murders are committed in the novel is referred to as the "Day of the Rope", which many neo-Nazis including Miller believe will one day become reality.

=== Opinion on minorities ===
Miller has shown hostility towards Jews, black people, LGBTQ people, and has frequently denied the Holocaust. He has expressed a desire to "gas them" and claims he is "building an army" online with the intent of carrying out his violent ideas. In several videos that he published online, he can be seen posing next to Nazi flags and wearing plate carriers brandishing swastikas in form of Velcro patches.

An open white supremacist, Miller is widely known for his hatred of black people. Due to his belief that they should be "sent back to Africa", he has been described as being a white nationalist. He has also used the phrase "only white lives matter" and has antagonized multiple Black Lives Matter protesters at several different protests.

=== George Floyd protests ===
In 2020, Miller stated that nobody has a right to protest the murder of George Floyd. He was also connected to the boogaloo movement and allegedly wore a boogaloo mask during a protest on May 31, 2020.

Miller attended a Trump rally and told a black woman with a sign that said "Black Lives Matter" that "only white lives matter" and "Heil Hitler" before calling another black woman a "chimp". Later that day, Miller drove by a Black Lives Matter rally in East Brunswick, New Jersey, and yelled "Nigger lives don't matter" several times at protesters.

In 2021, Miller and an unidentified man recorded themselves threatening a black man. Miller told the man to "Get the fuck out of here" and said that he and his friend will "kick [his] ass". He also referred to the man as a "nigger" multiple times and told the man he was in the "wrong neighborhood".

=== Online activity ===
Miller is an online influencer known for creating provocative livestream content. In many of his videos, he dresses as various characters and interacts with strangers on online chat platforms such as the now-defunct Omegle, where he discusses political topics while attempting to provoke or shock the people he encounters.

He has streamed content on several platforms, including DLive, Twitch, and Bitwave.tv, and has reuploaded recordings of his streams to sites such as BitChute, the Internet Archive, and his Telegram channel. His Telegram channel has amassed more than 40,000 followers.

Miller has been banned from numerous major social media platforms, including Instagram, YouTube, Twitch, DLive, and Facebook.

He has frequently been criticized for racist remarks and inappropriate online behavior. Miller has also been associated with other white supremacist internet personalities, including Tor Brookes, known online as CatboyKami, and Brandon Martinez, although he later had a falling out with Brookes.

== Legal issues ==
=== Assault and drug possession charges ===
In 2006, at the age of 18, Miller was charged with aggravated assault as a result of shooting people with a pellet gun. He pled guilty and was not sentenced to jail time.

In 2007, Miller was arrested and charged with possession of drugs and intent to sell. He served 180 days in jail and 4 years of probation.

=== Antifa incident and fallout ===
On October 12, 2018, Miller was involved in an altercation with Antifa protestors. Miller alleges he was trying to attend a speech given by Proud Boys founder Gavin McInnes in order to report on it. The incident took place outside of the Metropolitan Republican Club in New York City. Miller also reported that his backpack was stolen during the altercation. The police unsuccessfully searched for the person who stole Miller's backpack. Miller later stated "they tried to kill me" in reference to the altercation and called the attackers "terrorists". Finbarr Slonim, Kai Russo, and Caleb Perkins were later arrested and charged in connection with the assault.

Following the incident, Miller claimed he had an "awakening" and became "woke". He was allegedly frequently doxed and bombarded with death threats from people he claims are affiliated with Antifa following their attack on him. He has also claimed that people affiliated with Antifa threatened to burn down his parents' house. His story quickly gained traction on the internet and Miller claims he lost his job and as a result moved to Florida.

=== 2020 FBI visit ===
In May 2020, FBI agents showed up at Miller's parents' home and tried to reach him regarding statements he had made online.

=== Atomwaffen Division harassment ===
In 2021, Miller was targeted by a member of the neo-Nazi organization Atomwaffen Division. It is alleged that Miller was targeted for giving neo-Nazis and white supremacists a "bad rep". The attacker recorded videos threatening Miller that were allegedly taken outside of Miller's home in Florida. He also ordered takeout consistently and had it delivered to Miller's home and DoS attacked Miller so that he couldn't stream. Multiple taxis were also sent to Miller's address to pick him up.

On January 30, police received numerous calls relating to a suspect allegedly breaking into Miller's home although they were unable to locate the suspect upon arriving at the scene. They were continuously called regarding the alleged robbery upon leaving the scene. Miller later chose to leave his complex for a "little while" in hopes of allowing the situation to die down and to protect his neighbors.

=== 2021 FBI raid and firearm charge ===
On March 2, 2021, Miller was arrested on one charge of possessing a firearm as a convicted felon. According to reports, flashbangs went off during a raid of Miller's home in Fort Lauderdale, which took place at around five o'clock in the morning. The arrest stemmed from an incident that took place on January 17, 2018, in which Miller illegally possessed a gun. When confronted by the FBI, Miller told them it was he who was the victim in fear for his life: “I’m scared, I’m living alone, I don’t have anybody with me,” he told investigators, according to an FBI affidavit. “Somebody’s going to, these people are trying to kill me.”

On February 25, 2021, he was indicted on the January 2018 charge. His first hearing took place on March 3. He offered up an apology during the hearing saying "I'm really sorry for all of this. I really am." He also told the judge that he has enough money to hire his own attorney and had reportedly reached out to Mark O'Mara, the attorney who worked for George Zimmerman. He later hired the free speech activist and attorney Norman Kent. On March 10, during his bond trial, he was denied bail and was to remain incarcerated while on trial. On June 22, 2021, Miller pleaded guilty to one count each of possession of a firearm, possession of ammunition and possession of an unregistered firearm. On September 28, Miller was sentenced to 41 months of imprisonment followed by three years of supervised release.

On January 31, 2023, Miller was released from prison on good behavior and with parole. In April 2023, USA Today sent federal prison officials a list of questions about his access to the Internet while in federal custody. While in prison, Miller had used the Internet to harass people and sell racist paraphernalia. After being informed of this, the Federal Bureau of Prisons determined that this constituted a violation of the terms of his imprisonment. Within days, Miller was sent back to prison. He was released once again on July 3, 2023.
