= George W. White (American politician) =

American politician

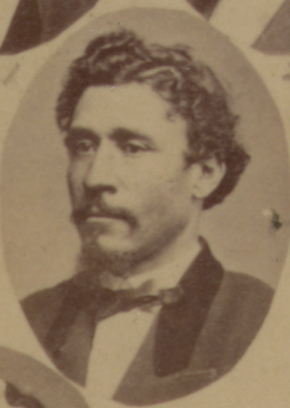

George W. White (born c. 1841) was an American state legislator in Mississippi. He served in the Mississippi House of Representatives from 1870 to 1873 and Mississippi Senate from 1874 to 1877. White was born in Mississippi. He represented Wilkinson County, Mississippi.

== See also ==
- African American officeholders from the end of the Civil War until before 1900
