= 1926 VFL grand final =

Grand final of the 1926 Victorian Football League season

1926 VFL Grand Final

Melbourne	Collingwood
17.17 (119)	9.8 (62)
	1	2	3	4
MEL	4.5 (29)	7.7 (49)	14.9 (93)	17.17 (119)
COLL	1.1 (7)	6.4 (40)	7.6 (48)	9.8 (62)
- Date: 9 October 1926
- Stadium: Melbourne Cricket Ground
- Attendance: 59,632

The 1926 VFL Grand Final was an Australian rules football game contested between the Melbourne Football Club and Collingwood Football Club, held at the Melbourne Cricket Ground in Melbourne on 9 October 1926. It was the 28th annual Grand Final of the Victorian Football League, staged to determine the premiers for the 1926 VFL season. The match, attended by 59,632 spectators, was won by Melbourne by a margin of 57 points, marking that club's second premiership victory and their first since 1900.

== Background ==
Collingwood came into the 1926 season as the runner-up from previous season after losing to Geelong in that year's grand final. Throughout the premiership season, Collingwood would finish on top of the ladder with a 15–3 record to win their 8th minor premiership with them defeating Carlton in the final round by 47 points to cement their spot on top by 4.1% over defending champions Geelong. In the semi-final, they took on third place Melbourne on the 25 September. After opening up a 22 point lead at the half, they would concede eight goals in the third quarter to bring Melbourne back into the match and would later go on to lose the match to the Demons by 11 points. Despite the loss, they advanced to the grand final as the minor premiers.

Melbourne had been eliminated in the preliminary final in the previous season to Collingwood and was trying to go one better than they did in the previous season. The team finished third on the table with a 14–4 record which meant they took on Collingwood. An eight goal third quarter set up the victory for Melbourne as they won by 11 points. Though due to the challenge round system they had to compete in a preliminary final, the following week against fourth place Essendon who had defeated Geelong in the other semi-final. Scores in the preliminary final was affected due to strong gusty winds that blew through the stadium. In what The Age described as a 'desperate and exciting finishes to the season', Melbourne held on to win by 3 points.

== Teams ==
Heading into the match, Melbourne made two changes to the side that defeated Essendon with Bob Corbett being replaced by Francis Vine after Corbett fractured his jaw during the match. The other change was the dropping of Ossie Green for Harry Coy. Collingwood also made two changes to their lineup that loss to Melbourne with Charlie Dibbs and George Clayden being replaced in the lineup for Ernie Wilson and Charlie Milburn.

Melbourne	Collingwood

Melbourne
B:	Charlie Streeter	Harry Coy	Jim Abernethy
HB:	Bill Tymms	Hugh Dunbar	Ted Thomas
C:	Dick Taylor	Ivor Warne-Smith	Jack Collins
HF:	Stan Wittman	Bob Johnson	Jimmy Davidson
F:	Francis Vine	Dave Duff	Harry Moyes
Foll:	Albert Chadwick (c)	Col Deane	Herbert White
Coach:	Albert Chadwick		

Collingwood
B:	Leo Wescott	George Beasley	Joe Poulter
HB:	Ernie Wilson	Albert Collier	Jim Shanahan
C:	John Harris	Jack Beveridge	Charlie Milburn
HF:	Reg Baker	Frank Murphy	Harry Chesswas
F:	Charlie Tyson (c)	Gordon Coventry	Harry Collier
Foll:	Syd Coventry	Bob Makeham	Billy Libbis
Coach:	Jock McHale		

- Umpires – Jack McMurray (field), Naismith (boundary), Davies (boundary), Jenkins (goal), Rouvray (goal).

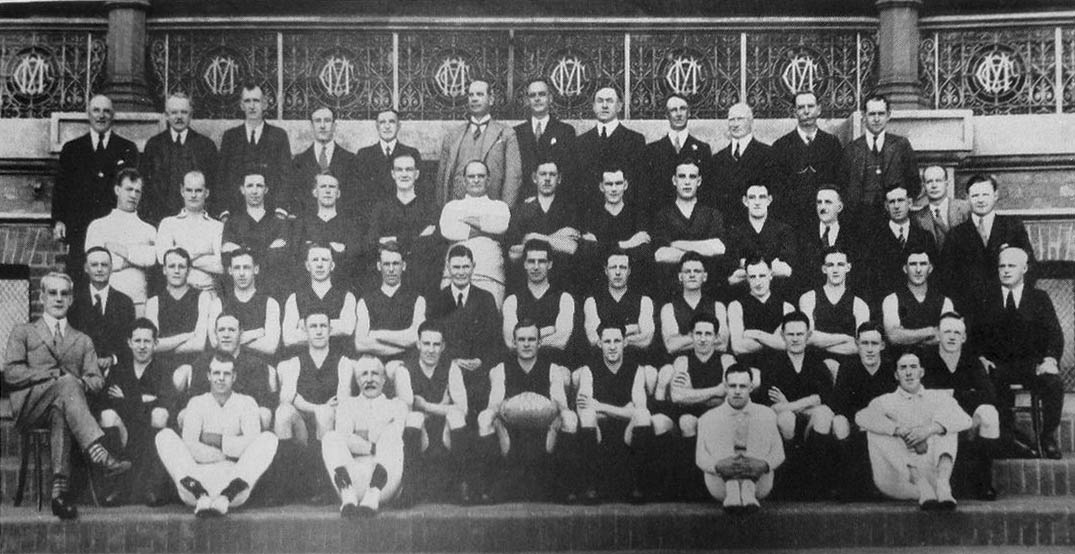
Melbourne FC team, premiers

== Scoreboard ==
Grand final
9 October	Melbourne	def.	Collingwood	MCG (crowd: 59,632)
4.5 (29); 7.7 (49); 14.9 (93); 17.17 (117)	Q1; Q2; Q3; Final	1.1 (7); 6.4 (40); 7.6 (48); 9.8 (62)
6: Johnson; 3: Moyes, Wittman; 2: Duff; 1: Deane, Taylor, Vine	Goals	3: Collier; 2: Coventry; 1: Baker, Collier, Libbis, Makeham

== See also ==
- 1926 VFL season
