= Gaudion =

Gaudion is a surname. Notable people with the surname include:

- Charlie Gaudion (1904–1979), Australian rules footballer
- Frank Gaudion (1882–1952), Australian rules footballer
- Jack Gaudion (1910–1993), Australian rules footballer
- Marcel Gaudion (1924–2021), French handball player
- Michael Gaudion (1938–2021), Australian rules footballer
- Phil Gaudion, Australian professional drummer
