= 1930 Adelaide Carnival =

Tournament information
- Sport: Australian football
- Location: Adelaide, Australia
- Dates: 30 July 1930–9 August 1930
- Format: Round Robin
- Teams: 6

Final champion
- Victoria

The 1930 Adelaide Carnival was the seventh edition of the Australian National Football Carnival, an Australian football interstate competition. It was held from 30 July to 9 August and was the second carnival to be hosted by the South Australia city of Adelaide.

All six states contested the carnival, which was staged as a full round-robin amongst the states. All fifteen matches were played at Adelaide Oval. For the third consecutive time, the carnival was won by Victoria, which was undefeated. South Australia, whose sole loss came against Victoria in the final match of the carnival, came second. Western Australia was third and New South Wales was fourth, after the former narrowly defeated the latter in the latter's final game – New South Wales' strong performances were considered the surprise of the tournament, and were put down to the inclusion for the first time in many years of Broken Hill-based players in the team. Queensland finished last, and was winless for the fourth time in four carnival appearances.

As often occurred at interstate carnivals, overuse of the ground and untimely rain resulted in the surface degenerating to a mudheap by the end of the carnival. Crowds were less than hoped, with the carnival making a loss of £200–300, which the ANFC put down to rain and the onset of the Great Depression. The carnival's leading goalkicker was Victoria's Bill Mohr, who kicked 35 goals, including 16 in one match against Queensland.

== Squads ==
Victoria

Victoria Carnival Squad

Carlton: C. Davey, C. Martyn

Collingwood: A. Collier, H. Collier, G. Clayden, S. Coventry (c), H. Rumney
Essendon: K. Forbes, J. W. Vosti
Fitzroy: J. Cashman, C. Chapman
Footscray: A. Hopkins, A. Morrison
Geelong: J. Carney, R. Hickey, G. Todd (vc)
Hawthorn: S. Stewart
North Melbourne: C. Cameron, J. Lewis
Richmond: M. Hunter, J. Titus
St Kilda: W. Mohr, F. Phillips
South Melbourne: H. Clarke

Western Australia

Western Australian Carnival Squad

Claremont: K. Hough, R. Lovegrove, G. Moloney

East Fremantle: G. Bee, C. Jarvis, Woods
East Perth: J. Guhl, W. Thomas, J. Walsh, A. Western
Perth: Johnson, R. Lucas, A. Shepherd
South Fremantle: R. Doig, R. Edgar, G. White
Subiaco: B. Diggins, J. Leonard, T. Outridge (c), S. Penberthy
West Perth: E. Flemming, J. Gordon, F. Hopkins, J. McDiarmid (vc), W. McGarry

South Australia

South Australian Carnival Squad

Glenelg: J. Handby (vc), J. Owens, L. Sallis

North Adelaide: D. Conrad, K. Farmer, H. Fleet, P. Furler
Norwood: W. Scott (c), G. Barbary, H. Krome, A. G. Lill
Port Adelaide: L. Dayman, V. Johnson, T. Quinn, T. Waye
South Adelaide: F. J. Tully
Sturt: V. Bateman, H. Johnston, W. Martin, E. W. Sims, C. L. Whitehead
West Adelaide: C. Bennett, J. Connell, H. Solomon
West Torrens: R. Osborn

Tasmania

Tasmanian Carnival Squad

Hobart: A. Leitch (c), Billett, Edwards, Bloomfield, Roberts, Maddock, Rait, McKay, Jelley, Evans, Hay, Dalton, Cole, Exton, Burrows.

Launceston: Cazaly (vc), Ryan, Nash, Joolen, Clarke, Bickford, Stott
North-West Coast: Acheson, Blake, Brumby.

New South Wales

New South Wales Carnival Squad

Eastern Suburbs: F. Linney, S. Milton, S. Organ (vc), F. Piper, F. Pratt

Newtown: D. Ayres, H. Finch, L. Hastie
North Broken Hill: C. Holmes, H. Proud
North Shore: H. V. London, D. Elliman (c)
St George: M. Tobiason
South Broken Hill: G. Cherry
South Sydney: J. Hayes
Sydney: W. R. McKoy, L. McKoy, E. McGuire
West Broken Hill: C. Bates, F. Cliff, E. Pell, L. Prior

Queensland

Queensland Carnival Squad

Brisbane Valley: J. Condon (vc), E. Cummins, H. Eakins, C. Etream, J. Kennedy, J. Kerr, P. Marsh, A. Smith

Mayne: N. Clayton, F. Deane, E. Hadwen, T. Hadwen, C. Ryan, V. Ryan, E. Wawby
South Brisbane: W. Becker, A. Nicholson (c)
Windsor: H. Green, E. Hall, L. Milburn, G. Oswald, L. Phillips, G. Turner, W. Vidgen

== Results ==
	1930 Adelaide Carnival
Wednesday, 30 July (12:30pm)	New South Wales 21.12 (138)	def.	Queensland 7.20 (62)	Adelaide Oval (crowd: 12,600 (C-R))
Wednesday, 30 July (3:00pm)	South Australia 16.10 (106)	def.	Western Australia 12.10 (82)	Adelaide Oval (crowd: 12,600)
Thursday, 31 July (3:00pm)	Victoria 22.20 (154)	def.	Tasmania 7.8 (50)	Adelaide Oval (crowd: 3,066)
Friday, 1 August (3:00pm)	South Australia 19.18 (132)	def.	Queensland 5.3 (33)	Adelaide Oval (crowd: 1,415)
Saturday, 2 August (12:30pm)	New South Wales 18.15 (123)	def.	Tasmania 6.12 (48)	Adelaide Oval (crowd: 16,131 (C-R))
Saturday, 2 August (3:00pm)	Victoria 10.10 (70)	def.	Western Australia 9.8 (62)	Adelaide Oval (crowd: 16,131)
Monday, 4 August (12:30pm)	Tasmania 18.13 (121)	def.	Queensland 10.16 (76)	Adelaide Oval (crowd: 5,491 (C-R))
Monday, 4 August (3:00pm)	South Australia 24.16 (160)	def.	New South Wales 10.16 (76)	Adelaide Oval (crowd: 5,491)
Tuesday, 5 August (12:30pm)	Western Australia 24.17 (161)	def.	Queensland 16.9 (105)	Adelaide Oval (crowd: 2,300 (C-R))
Tuesday, 5 August (3:00pm)	Victoria 27.20 (182)	def.	New South Wales 9.10 (64)	Adelaide Oval (crowd: 2,300)
Wednesday, 6 August (3:00pm)	South Australia 15.22 (112)	def.	Tasmania 5.11 (41)	Adelaide Oval
Thursday, 7 August (12:30pm)	Victoria 31.26 (212)	def.	Queensland 10.7 (67)	Adelaide Oval (crowd: 1,507 C-R)
Thursday, 7 August (3:00pm)	Western Australia 8.9 (57)	def.	New South Wales 7.8 (50)	Adelaide Oval (crowd: 1,507)
Saturday, 9 August (12:30pm)	Western Australia 20.6 (126)	def.	Tasmania 10.7 (67)	Adelaide Oval (crowd: 32,700 C-R)
Saturday, 9 August (3:00pm)	Victoria 12.15 (77)	def.	South Australia 7.5 (47)	Adelaide Oval (crowd: 32,700)

=== Ladder ===
1930 Adelaide Carnival ladder
Pos	Team	Pld	W	L	D	PF	PA	PP	Pts
1	Victoria	5	5	0	0	702	290	70.77	10
2	South Australia	5	4	1	0	557	315	63.88	8
3	Western Australia	5	3	2	0	488	396	55.20	6
4	New South Wales	5	2	3	0	448	509	46.81	4
5	Tasmania	5	1	4	0	327	589	35.70	2
6	Queensland	5	0	5	0	343	764	30.98	0

Rules for classification: 1) points; 2) percentage; 3) number of points for.

== Goalkickers ==
Ranking	Player	Goals	Team
1	Bill Mohr	35	Victoria
2	Alan Rait	27	Tasmania
3	Jack Titus	22	Victoria
4	Frank Hopkins	19	Western Australia
4	George Moloney	19	Western Australia
