= Jack Charlesworth =

Jack Charlesworth may refer to:

- Jack Charlesworth (footballer)
- Jack Charlesworth (trade unionist)

== See also ==
- John Charlesworth (disambiguation)
