= Roy Thompson =

Roy Thompson may refer to:

- Mat Roy Thompson (1874–1962), a.k.a. Roy Thompson, American civil engineer and builder of Scotty's Castle
- Roy Thompson (footballer) (1905–1981), Australian rules footballer
- Roy Thompson (politician) (born 1946), Northern Irish Unionist politician
- Roy Thompson (rugby league) (1916–2001), Australian rugby league footballer
- Roy Thompson Jr. (born c. 1984), American college football coach

== See also ==
- Roy Thomson, 1st Baron Thomson of Fleet, Canadian-born British businessman
- Roy Hendry Thomson, Scottish politician
