= Jack Gaudion =

Australian rules footballer, born 1910

Personal information
- Full name: John Donald Gaudion
- Born: 23 July 1910; Footscray, Victoria
- Died: 24 August 1993 (aged 83)
- Original team: Yarraville
- Height: 180 cm (5 ft 11 in)
- Weight: 85 kg (187 lb)

Playing career^{1}
Years	Club	Games (Goals)
1933, 1935	North Melbourne	3 (0)
1936	Geelong	4 (2)
Total		7 (2)
- ^{1} Playing statistics correct to the end of 1936.

John Donald Gaudion (23 July 1910 – 24 August 1993) was an Australian rules footballer who played with North Melbourne and Geelong in the Victorian Football League (VFL).

== Family ==
The son of John Richard Gaudion (1878–1914), and Margaret Robina Parkhill Gaudion (1884–1964), née Cunningham, John Donald Gaudion was born at Footscray, Victoria on 23 July 1910.

He was the uncle of North Melbourne player Michael Gaudion (1938–2021), the brother of North Melbourne footballer Charles Henry "Charlie" Gaudion (1904–1979), and the nephew of Collingwood footballer Francis Charles "Frank" Gaudion (1882–1952).
