= Jim Abernethy =

Australian rules footballer (1902–1974)

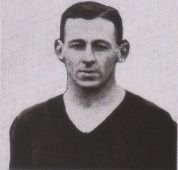

Personal information
- Full name: Noel James Abernethy
- Nickname: Jimmy
- Born: 4 November 1902; Shepparton, Victoria
- Died: 1 October 1974 (aged 71); Manly, New South Wales
- Original teams: Wesley College, Shepparton
- Height: 175 cm (5 ft 9 in)
- Weight: 81 kg (179 lb)
- Position: Half back flank

Playing career^{1}
Years	Club	Games (Goals)
1923–24, 1926–32	Melbourne	130 (61)
- ^{1} Playing statistics correct to the end of 1932.

Career highlights
- VFL premiership player: 1926

Noel James Abernethy (4 November 1902 – 1 October 1974) was an Australian rules footballer who played as a half-back flanker who played for the Melbourne Football Club after being schooled at Wesley College. He played 130 games for Melbourne between 1923–24 and 1926–32. He kicked 61 goals.

Abernethy was originally from Shepparton and attended boarding school at Wesley. Abernethy had a successful junior career for Wesley, being the champion player of the Associated Public Schools of Victoria. As such he attracted interest from many VFL clubs. Because he had been living in St Kilda, the St Kilda claimed that Abernethy was in their zone. The Demons, however, argued that he technically still lived with his parents in Shepparton. The VFL committee ended up siding with Melbourne's point of view and the Demons signed Abernethy.

Abernethy played for Melbourne in 1923 and 1924, but moved back to Shepparton in 1925, to further his law career. Abernethy was captain the Shepparton Football Club when they won the 1925 Goulburn Valley Football Netball League premiership.

Abernethy came back to play for Melbourne the next season and was a part of their premiership team. He continued to play for the Demons until his retirement from VFL football in 1932.

Abernethy was made a life member of the Melbourne Football Club in 1961. In 2008, to celebrate the 150th anniversary of the Melbourne Football Club's founding, the Demons named their "150 greatest heroes", of which Abernethy was one.

== Statistics ==
Legend
G	Goals	K	Kicks	D	Disposals	T	Tackles
B	Behinds	H	Handballs	M	Marks
#	Played in that season's premiership team

Season	Team	No.	Games	Totals							Averages (per game)							Votes
Season	Team	No.	Games	G	B	K	H	D	M	T	G	B	K	H	D	M	T	Votes
1923	Melbourne	14	15	10	—N/a	—N/a	—N/a	—N/a	—N/a	—N/a	0.7	—N/a	—N/a	—N/a	—N/a	—N/a	—N/a	0
1924	Melbourne	14	7	3	—N/a	—N/a	—N/a	—N/a	—N/a	—N/a	0.4	—N/a	—N/a	—N/a	—N/a	—N/a	—N/a	0
1925	Melbourne	14	0	—N/a	—N/a	—N/a	—N/a	—N/a	—N/a	—N/a	—N/a	—N/a	—N/a	—N/a	—N/a	—N/a	—N/a	—N/a
1926^{#}	Melbourne	4	19	6	—N/a	—N/a	—N/a	—N/a	—N/a	—N/a	0.3	—N/a	—N/a	—N/a	—N/a	—N/a	—N/a	0
1927	Melbourne	4	18	11	—N/a	—N/a	—N/a	—N/a	—N/a	—N/a	0.6	—N/a	—N/a	—N/a	—N/a	—N/a	—N/a	0
1928	Melbourne	4	14	20	—N/a	—N/a	—N/a	—N/a	—N/a	—N/a	1.4	—N/a	—N/a	—N/a	—N/a	—N/a	—N/a	0
1929	Melbourne	4	18	6	—N/a	—N/a	—N/a	—N/a	—N/a	—N/a	0.3	—N/a	—N/a	—N/a	—N/a	—N/a	—N/a	0
1930	Melbourne	4	12	4	—N/a	—N/a	—N/a	—N/a	—N/a	—N/a	0.3	—N/a	—N/a	—N/a	—N/a	—N/a	—N/a	0
1931	Melbourne	4	18	0	—N/a	—N/a	—N/a	—N/a	—N/a	—N/a	0.0	—N/a	—N/a	—N/a	—N/a	—N/a	—N/a	2
1932	Melbourne	4	9	1	—N/a	—N/a	—N/a	—N/a	—N/a	—N/a	0.1	—N/a	—N/a	—N/a	—N/a	—N/a	—N/a	0
Career			130	61	—N/a	—N/a	—N/a	—N/a	—N/a	—N/a	0.0	—N/a	—N/a	—N/a	—N/a	—N/a	—N/a	2
