= Sir Chadwick =

Sir Chadwick may refer to:

- Albert Chadwick, Australian footballer
- Edwin Chadwick, 19th century social reformer
- James Chadwick, physicist
