= Alfred Bryan =

Alfred Bryan may refer to:

- Alfred Bryan (illustrator) (1852–1899), English illustrator
- Alfred Bryan (lyricist) (1871–1958), Canadian lyricist

== See also ==
- Alfred Ryan (1904–1990), Australian sportsman
