= Jack Sheehan =

Jack Sheehan may refer to:

- John J. Sheehan (born 1940), United States Marine Corps general
- Jack Sheehan (baseball) (1893–1987), baseball player
- Jack Sheehan (footballer) (1890–1933), Australian rules footballer
