= Charlie Chapman (Australian footballer) =

Australian rules footballer (1905–1978)

Personal information
- Full name: Charles Thomas Chapman
- Born: 11 January 1905; Clifton Hill, Victoria
- Died: 17 April 1978 (aged 73); Fitzroy, Victoria
- Original team: Scotch College
- Height: 180 cm (5 ft 11 in)
- Weight: 78 kg (172 lb)

Playing career^{1}
Years	Club	Games (Goals)
1924–1931	Fitzroy	104 (161)
- ^{1} Playing statistics correct to the end of 1931.

Charles Thomas Chapman (11 January 1905 – 17 April 1978) was an Australian rules footballer who played with Fitzroy in the Victorian Football League (VFL).

== Family ==
His son, James Chapman, played for Fitzroy in the 1950s.

== Football ==
Chapman, a ruckman and centre half-forward, first appeared for Fitzroy in the 1924 finals. He played in two semi finals and kicked two goals in each. This made him the first ever Fitzroy player to make his league debut in a finals series.

He was a regular fixture in the Fitzroy team from 1925 and also represented Victoria at interstate football on 10 occasions, including matches in the 1930 Adelaide Carnival.

In 1929 he captained Fitzroy for the season but they would finish second last on the ladder and vacated the position when Colin Niven became playing coach.

Chapman was Fitzroy's leading goal-kicker in the 1930 VFL season with 46 goals from 18 games. This included seven goal hauls against both Melbourne and Hawthorn. It was the only season in full-forward Jack Moriarty's 10 years at Fitzroy that he wouldn't top the goal-kicking.
