= Ted Thomas (footballer, born 1898) =

Australian rules footballer

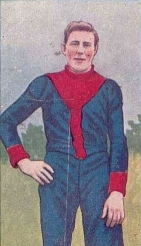

Personal information
- Full name: Edward Hazen Thomas
- Born: 9 August 1898; Yarrawonga, Victoria
- Died: 8 May 1965 (aged 66); Heidelberg, Victoria
- Original teams: Yarrawonga, Oakleigh
- Height: 175 cm (5 ft 9 in)
- Weight: 76 kg (168 lb)
- Position: Half-back flank

Playing career^{1}
Years	Club	Games (Goals)
1921–1928; 1932	Melbourne	104 (3)
- ^{1} Playing statistics correct to the end of 1932.

Career highlights
- Melbourne premiership player 1926

Edward Hazen Thomas (9 August 1898 – 8 May 1965) was an Australian rules football player at the Melbourne Football Club in the Victorian Football League (VFL).

In 1926, he became one of the club's premiership players, under the auspices of captain-coach Albert Chadwick. Thomas made his debut against Essendon in round 1 of the 1921 VFL season, at the East Melbourne Cricket Ground. He has been given the Melbourne Heritage Number of 385, based on the order of his debut for the club. Originally from Oakleigh Football Club in the Victorian Football Association (VFA), he returned there for the 1929, 1930 and 1931 seasons before returning to Melbourne for a final season in the VFL.

His grandson, Leon Baker, played for Essendon in the 1980s.
