= Jim Condon =

Jim Condon may refer to:

- Jim Condon (footballer)
- Jim Condon (politician)

== See also ==
- James Condon, Australian actor
