= Francis Vine =

Australian rules footballer (1904–1960)

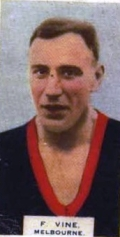

Personal information
- Full name: Francis Seymour Vine
- Nickname: Pop
- Born: 1 October 1904
- Died: 6 October 1960 (aged 56)
- Original team: Old Melburnians
- Height: 188 cm (6 ft 2 in)
- Weight: 84 kg (185 lb)

Playing career^{1}
Years	Club	Games (Goals)
1926–1934	Melbourne	105 (41)
- ^{1} Playing statistics correct to the end of 1934.

Career highlights
- VFL premiership: 1926; Melbourne captain: 1932–1933

Francis "Pop" Vine (1 October 1904 – 6 October 1960) was an Australian rules footballer who played with Melbourne in the Victorian Football League (VFL).

Vine is one of just four players in VFL/AFL history to play in a premiership on debut, along with Bill James, George Rawle and Marlion Pickett. He had been called up, to play the 1926 VFL Grand Final, as a replacement player for Bob Corbett. A centre half-back, Vine was club captain in 1932 and 1933.
