= 1927 Melbourne Carnival =

Tournament information
- Sport: Australian football
- Location: Melbourne, Australia
- Dates: 10 August 1927–20 August 1927
- Format: Round Robin
- Teams: 5

Final champion
- Victoria

The 1927 Melbourne Carnival was the sixth Australian National Football Carnival: an Australian football interstate competition.

New South Wales caused the biggest upset of the carnival when they defeated Tasmania by three points and, also, came close to beating Western Australia. Victoria again finished on top of the table.

== Participating teams ==
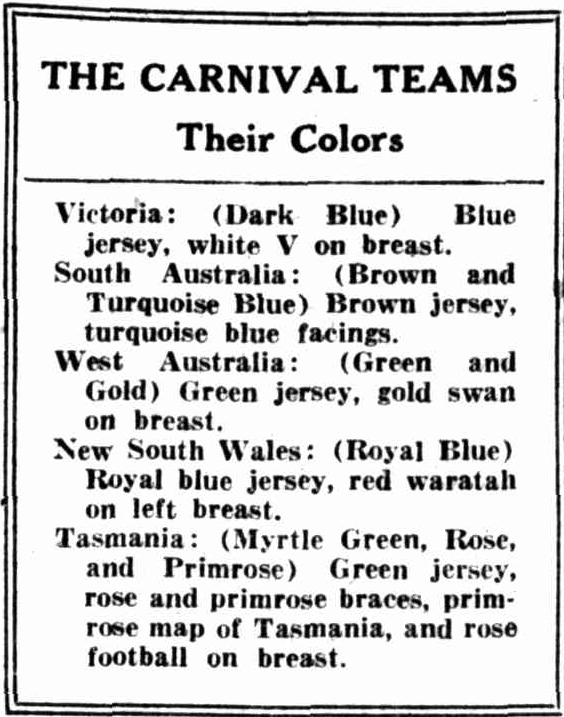
The colours of the five participating teams.

=== Queensland ===
Queensland did not send a team to the Carnival.

=== Victoria's two-teams controversy ===
Victoria caused a controversy when it played a second eighteen in a match against a weaker state (i.e., against NSW, on 19 August 1927: see below) in order to keep its first eighteen fresh for the final match of the carnival, when it was to play against Western Australia.

Consequently, on 19 August 1927, the Australian National Football Council — on the grounds that, "it was an unfair advantage for the home team to choose from 200 players when the Visiting team had only 23 to 25 to pick from" — unanimously adopted a new rule for future carnivals; namely that, "in future football carnivals, the controlling bodies in each State shall nominate 25 players for the opening of the carnival, and the players so nominated, and no others, shall be entitled to play".

== Players ==
All competing teams had 18 players, with no reserves.

=== New South Wales ===
Jack Sheehan (coach); Clement "Stumpy" Clark, Frederick "Snowy" Davies, Charlie "Mustard" Kean, George S. Knott, Samuel George "Sam" Organ, and Raymond Samuel "Ray" Usher of Eastern Suburbs; Douglas Rupert Gordon "Doug" Ayres, Horrie Finch, Arthur "Chubby" Gloster (captain), Eric William Justice, and Robert "Bobby" Smith of Newtown; Albert "Bert" McLean, and Hedley Clive Rooke of North Shore; Roy Pembroke Skelton, of Railway; Frank Cawsey, Harold John "Nugget" Green, Jack Hayes, Joe Smith, and Clifford "Snowy" Stanford of South Sydney; Emmett Joseph McGuire, and William Robert "Bill" McKoy of Sydney; and three players from the Riverina: Jack Dunn, of Ganmain; Ignatius Patrick "Nace" Kane, of Holbrook; and Walter Thomas Longmire, of Corowa.

=== South Australia ===
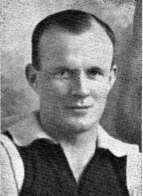
South Australia's Alfred Ryan

Managed by Mr. C.F. Young, the secretary of the North Adelaide Football Club, the players were Bruce McGregor (captain), from West Adelaide; Walter Scott (vice-captain), from Norwood; Gordon Barbary, Jim Handby, and Jack Owens, from Glenelg; Bert Hawke, Edward "Boy" Morris, Raymond Munn, and William James "Billy" Thomas, from North Adelaide; Alick Lill, and Ernest William Charles Wadham, from Norwood; Peter Bampton, Victor Johnson, Clifford Keal, and Ernest Warden Gordon "Punch" Mucklow, from Port Adelaide; Alfred Ryan, and William George "Bill" Oliver, from South Adelaide; Norman Barron, Horrie Riley, and Charlie Whitehead, from Sturt; and Len "Buck" Ashby, Ernest John Hine, and Tom Kempster, from West Torrens.

=== Tasmania ===
Frank Burridge, of Burnie; Jack Charlesworth (captain-coach), Horrie Gorringe, Fred Pringle, and Alan Scott of Cananore; Derek Bloomfield, and Keith Roberts of New Town; Albert "Alby" Bonnitcha, and Stan Felmingham of North Hobart; H.O. "Nip" Smith, of Penguin; Harry Pollock, of Ulverstone; Fred Aherne, Hector Brooks, Jack Dunn, Dick Freeman, Max Hay, Max Hislop, Fred Peacock, Hector Smith, J. Lewis, James Archibald "Snowy" Atkinson, T. Atcheson, D. Adams, and E. Foley.

=== Victoria ===
The Victorian squad was: Alex Duncan of Carlton; Ted Baker, Gordon Coventry, and Syd Coventry of Collingwood; Garnet Campbell, Allan Geddes, Frank Maher, and Greg Stockdale of Essendon; Jack Moriarty of Fitzroy; George Jerram and Arthur Rayson of Geelong; Bert Chadwick, Bob Corbett, Dick Taylor, Ivor Warne-Smith, and Herbert White of Melbourne; Dave Walsh of North Melbourne; Jack Baggott, Donald Don, Basil McCormack, and George Rudolph of Richmond; and Bill Berryman, and Martin Brown of South Melbourne.

==== Two Victorian teams ====
The weaker Victorian team — the centre of the controversy (on the grounds that only four of the team's players had appeared in either of Victoria's two earlier Carnival matches) — made up of Frank Maher of Essendon (captain); Gordon Coventry of Collingwood; Garnet Campbell, Joe Harrison, and Greg Stockdale of Essendon; Gordon Hellwig, and Len Wigraft of Fitzroy; Charlie Gaudion, Alby Outen, and Roy Thompson of Footscray; Ted Pool of Hawthorn; Tommy McConville of Melbourne; Leo Dwyer, and Bill Russ of North Melbourne; Percy Bentley, and Tom O'Halloran of Richmond; and Martin Brown, and Austin Robertson of South Melbourne, played against New South Wales on Friday, 19 August, the day before the State's final match against West Australia.

Weaker Victorian Team — (19 August)
B:	Charlie Gaudion	Gordon Hellwig	Greg Stockdale
HB:	Alby Outen	Joe Harrison	Roy Thompson
C:	Garnet Campbell	Leo Dwyer	Bill Russ
HF:	Tommy McConville	Tom O'Halloran	Austin Robertson
F:	Percy Bentley	Gordon Coventry	Ted Pool
Foll:	Len Wigraft	Martin Brown	Frank Maher (c)

The full-strength Victorian team that played against West Australia on Saturday, 20 August, contained only two of those (Greg Stockdale and Gordon Coventry) who had played the day before; George Todd of Geelong, and Greg Stockdale of Essendon, replaced the injured Donald Don and Arthur Rayson (respectively) in the (well rested) full-strength side that had played against Tasmania five days earlier.

Full Strength Victorian Team — (20 August)
B:	Bob Corbett	George Todd	Bill Berryman
HB:	Bert Chadwick (c)	Alex Duncan	Basil McCormack
C:	Dick Taylor	Ivor Warne-Smith	Allan Geddes
HF:	Greg Stockdale	George Jerram	Jack Baggott
F:	Ted Baker	Gordon Coventry	Jack Moriarty
Foll:	Syd Coventry	George Rudolph	Herbert White

=== Western Australia ===
Phil Matson (coach), and Arthur Howson, of Claremont-Cottesloe; Denis "Dinny" Coffey, and Dave Woods of East Fremantle; Hugh "Bonny" Campbell, Wally Fletcher, Jack Guhl, Joe "Brum" O'Meara, Albert George Percy "Staunch" Owens, Henry James "Harry" Sherlock, Valentine Christopher "Val" Sparrow, Albert Western of East Perth; Allan Evans, Leo M'Comish, and Albert Watts (captain) of Perth; C.J. "Jerry" Sunderland, of South Fremantle; Wilfred James Patrick "Bill" Brophy, Arthur Robert Green, John McGregor "Snowy" Hamilton, Johnny Leonard, Tom Outridge (vice-captain), and Alf Smith of Subiaco; and Jim Craig, and Jack McDiarmid of West Perth.

== Individual match results ==
Winning team	Score	Losing team	Score	Date	Venue
Western Australia	12.15 (87)	South Australia	9.18 (72)	10 August 1927	M.C.G.
New South Wales	12.11 (83)	Tasmania	11.14 (80)	11 August 1927	M.C.G.
Western Australia	18.14 (122)	New South Wales	14.19 (103)	13 August 1927	M.C.G.
Victoria	21.19 (145)	South Australia	14.12 (96)	13 August 1927	M.C.G.
Victoria	24.11 (155)	Tasmania	13.12 (90)	15 August 1927	M.C.G.
South Australia	29.20 (194)	New South Wales	6.11 (47)	17 August 1927	M.C.G.
Western Australia	12.16 (88)	Tasmania	12.15 (87)	17 August 1927	M.C.G.
Victoria	24.10 (154)	New South Wales	9.12 (66)	19 August 1927	M.C.G.
South Australia	20.23 (143)	Tasmania	14.24 (108)	20 August 1927	M.C.G.
Victoria	11.19 (85)	Western Australia	10.12 (72)	20 August 1927	M.C.G.

== Carnival championship table ==
Pos	Team	Pld	W	L	PF	PA	PP	Pts
1	Victoria	4	4	0	539	324	166.4	16
2	Western Australia	4	3	1	369	347	106.3	12
3	South Australia	4	2	2	505	387	130.5	8
4	New South Wales	4	1	3	299	550	54.4	4
5	Tasmania	4	0	4	365	469	77.8	0

== Leading Goalkickers ==
- Gordon Coventry (Victoria) - 27
- Fred 'Cocky' Aherne (Tasmania) - 20
