= Tommy McConville (Australian footballer) =

Australian rules footballer, born 1901

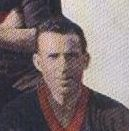

Personal information
- Full name: Esmond Frederick McConville
- Born: 28 March 1901; Ararat, Victoria
- Died: 23 May 1969 (aged 68); Golden Square, Victoria
- Original team: Donald Football Club
- Height: 175 cm (5 ft 9 in)
- Weight: 75 kg (165 lb)

Playing career^{1}
Years	Club	Games (Goals)
1927–29	Melbourne	35 (58)
- ^{1} Playing statistics correct to the end of 1929.

Esmond Frederick "Tommy" McConville (28 March 1901 – 23 May 1969) was an Australian rules footballer who played with Melbourne in the Victorian Football League (VFL).

McConville was recruited from the Donald Football Club. and represented Victoria in 1927.

== See also ==
- 1927 Melbourne Carnival
