= Alby Outen =

Australian rules footballer (1902–1972)

Personal information
- Full name: Albert Henry Outen
- Born: 6 December 1902; Williamstown, Victoria
- Died: 21 July 1972 (aged 69); Yarraville, Victoria
- Original team: Trinity Grammar
- Height: 178 cm (5 ft 10 in)
- Weight: 76 kg (168 lb)

Playing career^{1}
Years	Club	Games (Goals)
1922–1924	Footscray (VFA)	20 (1)
1925–1930	Footscray	65 (0)
- ^{1} Playing statistics correct to the end of 1930.

Career highlights
- McCarthy trophy: 1928

Albert Henry Outen (6 December 1902 – 21 July 1972) was an Australian rules footballer who played with Footscray in the Victorian Football Association (VFA) and Victorian Football League (VFL) during the 1920s.

== Family ==
The youngest of the six children of Charles George Outen (1856–1929), and Bridget Outen, née Cross, Albert Henry Outen was born at Williamstown, Victoria on 6 December 1902.

- His brother, Charles Whynam "Wyn" Outen (1880–1964), played for St Klda in the VFL and for Williamstown in the VFA; Wyn played (alongside his brother Matt) in the Willamstown First XVIII team that won the 1907 VFA premiership.
- His brother, William Matthew "Matt" Outen (1883–1930), also played for St Kilda in the VFL and Williamstown in the VFA.
- His brother, John Edward "Jack" Outen (1890–1963), played in one First XVIII game for Williamstown (alongside his brother Matt) in 1909.
- His brother, Percy Ernest Hatherley Outen (1898–1986), played in 5 First XVIII games for Williamstown in the VFA in 1928.
- His nephew, Reginald Whynam Outen (1913–1999), the son of Wyn Outen, was an emergency in Williamstown's 1939 premiership team, after earlier playing with Collingwood and Melbourne Seconds.
- His son, Albert Keith "Alby" Outen (1936–2010), played 2 games with Footscray in 1954 before transferring to Williamstown and playing in their 1955 and 1956 premiership teams.

He married Eva Grace Brown (1903–1996) in 1927.

== Football ==
Outen first played for Footscray in 1922 and soon established himself in defence. In 1928 he won their best and fairest award.

== See also ==
- 1927 Melbourne Carnival
