= Charlie Whitehead (footballer) =

Australian rules footballer (1899–1972)

Personal information
- Full name: Charles C. Whitehead
- Born: 18 May 1899; Brighton, South Australia
- Died: 16 November 1972 (aged 73)
- Original team: Mitcham
- Height: 188 cm (6 ft 2 in)
- Weight: 85 kg (187 lb)

Playing career^{1}
Years	Club	Games (Goals)
1924–31, 1933–34	Sturt	124 (134)
1932	St Kilda	9 (9)

Representative team honours
Years	Team	Games (Goals)
	South Australia	15
- ^{1} Playing statistics correct to the end of 1934.

Charlie Whitehead (18 May 1899 – 16 November 1972) was an Australian rules footballer who played with St Kilda in the Victorian Football League (VFL) and Sturt in the South Australian National Football League (SANFL).

== Football ==
=== Sturt (SAFL/SANFL) ===
Whitehead played at Sturt with his brother Reg and they were both followers in the 1926 premiership winning team. He was club captain in the 1928 season.

A ruckman, Whitehead kicked 16 goals from the 11 interstate games which he played for South Australia, including matches at the 1927 Melbourne Carnival and 1930 Adelaide Carnival.

=== St Kilda (VFL) ===
In 1932 he returned to Melbourne to spend a season with St Kilda, but resigned in early August, citing his dissatisfaction at having been demoted to the reserves.

=== Sturt (SANFL) ===
He finished his career back at Sturt, where he played for two more years.

== See also ==
- 1927 Melbourne Carnival
