= Ted Pool =

Australian rules footballer (1905–1975)

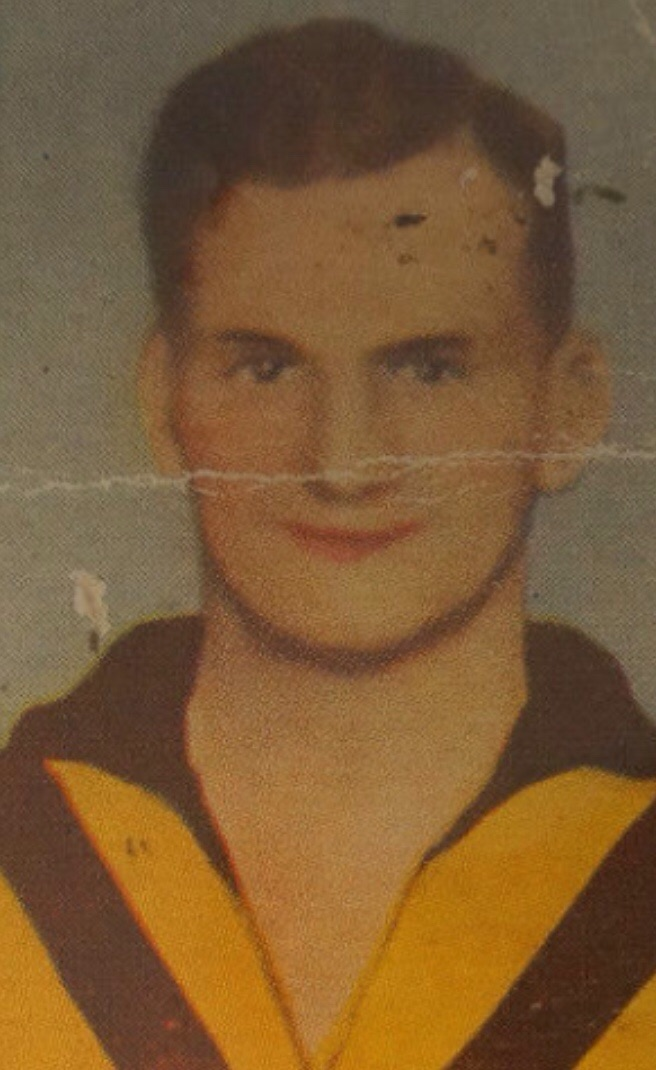
- Pool's football card

Personal information
- Full name: Herbert Edwin Pool
- Born: 9 November 1905; Boulder, Western Australia
- Died: 11 February 1975 (aged 69); Glen Iris, Victoria
- Original team: Kalgoorlie City
- Height: 165 cm (5 ft 5 in)
- Weight: 65 kg (143 lb)

Playing career^{1}
Years	Club	Games (Goals)
1926–1938	Hawthorn	200 (230)

Representative team honours
Years	Team	Games (Goals)
	Victoria	7 (?)
- ^{1} Playing statistics correct to the end of 1938.

Career highlights
- Hawthorn leading goalkicker: 1933

Herbert Edwin "Ted" Pool (9 November 1905 – 11 February 1975) was an Australian rules footballer who played with Hawthorn in the Victorian Football League (VFL).

== Family ==
The son of William James Pool (1882-1934), and Harriet Jane Pool (1885-1962), née George, Herbert Edwin Pool was born at Boulder, Western Australia on 9 November 1905.

He married Thelma Marjorie Batten (1910-1989), one of twins, on 28 March 1934.

== Football ==
=== Hawthorn (VFL) ===
Pool was a rover, and by playing 200 games of VFL football he became the first West Australian-born player to reach that milestone.

Despite his ability, playing for Victoria seven times, Hawthorn were a very poor team during his career.

Pool is (as of 2014) one of only five players in the AFL/VFL to play 200 games or more without playing a final (the others are Steve Smith and Gary Hardeman of Melbourne and Geoff Cunningham and Trevor Barker of St. Kilda).

=== Camberwell (VFA) ===
Pool played 10 games at the age of 33 with the Camberwell Football club in 1939.

== Death ==
Ted Pool died at Glen Iris on 11 February 1975 and is buried at Fawkner Memorial Park.

== Honours and achievements ==
- Hawthorn leading goalkicker: 1933
- Hawthorn Hall of Fame
- Hawthorn life member

== See also ==
- 1927 Melbourne Carnival
