= Stuart Stewart =

Australian rules footballer (1907–1978)

Personal information
- Full name: Stuart Gilchrist Stewart
- Born: 26 April 1907; Hamilton, Victoria
- Died: 26 April 1978 (aged 71); Rocklea, Queensland
- Original team: Ararat
- Height: 185 cm (6 ft 1 in)
- Weight: 83 kg (183 lb)

Playing career^{1}
| Years | Club | Games (Goals) |
| 1926–1935 | Hawthorn | 130 (34) |

Representative team honours
| Years | Team | Games (Goals) |
| | Victoria | 5 (?) |
- ^{1} Playing statistics correct to the end of 1935.

Stuart Gilchrist Stewart (26 April 1907 – 26 April 1978) was an Australian rules footballer who played with Hawthorn in the Victorian Football League (VFL).

== Early life ==
The son of Francis William Stewart (1870–1932) and Margaret Mary Gilchrist Stewart (1885–1962), nee Laidlaw, Stuart Gilchrist Stewart was born in Hamilton on 26 April 1907.

== Football ==
Stewart joined Hawthorn from Ararat at the commencement of the 1926 VFL season. Hard working, energetic and combative, Stewart was one of the best and most consistent players to represent Hawthorn during their inaugural decade in the VFL, being awarded 25 Brownlow Medal votes during his career. Equally at home across half back or in the ruck, Stewart was renowned for his ability to bring down high-flying marks seemingly regardless of the risk. He represented Victoria on 5 occasions.

In 1936, Stewart became playing-coach of the Hawthorn seconds.

== Later life ==
In 1934, he married Beatrice Florence Bardon and they lived in Hawthorn.

Stewart later served in the Australian Army during World War II.

In the early 1950s they moved to Brisbane, where they lived until his death in 1979.

== Honours and achievements ==
Individual

- Hawthorn life member
