= Doug Ayres =

Australian rules footballer

Personal information
- Full name: Douglas Rupert Gordon Ayres
- Born: 26 September 1906; Randwick, New South Wales
- Died: 25 September 1974 (aged 67); Bentleigh, Victoria
- Original team: Newtown (Sydney)
- Height: 178 cm (5 ft 10 in)
- Weight: 79 kg (174 lb)

Playing career^{1}
Years	Club	Games (Goals)
1931	Footscray	2 (1)
- ^{1} Playing statistics correct to the end of 1931.

Douglas Rupert Gordon Ayres (26 September 1906 – 25 September 1974) was a former Australian rules footballer who played with Footscray in the Victorian Football League (VFL).

== Family ==
The son of William Ayres, and Maude Ayres, née Watkins, Douglas Rupert Gordon Ayres was born at Randwick, New South Wales on 26 September 1906.

== Death ==
He died at Bentleigh, Victoria on 25 September 1974.

== See also ==
- 1927 Melbourne Carnival
- 1930 Adelaide Carnival
