= Bob Smith (Australian footballer, born 1906) =

Australian rules footballer, born 1906

Personal information
- Full name: Bob Smith
- Born: 28 August 1906
- Died: 27 April 1987 (aged 80)
- Original team: Newtown
- Height: 183 cm (6 ft 0 in)
- Weight: 79 kg (174 lb)

Playing career^{1}
| Years | Club | Games (Goals) |
| 1928 | North Melbourne | 16 (0) |
- ^{1} Playing statistics correct to the end of 1928.

Bob Smith (28 August 1906 – 27 April 1987) was an Australian rules footballer who played with North Melbourne in the Victorian Football League (VFL).

== See also ==
- 1927 Melbourne Carnival
