= Alby Outen Jr. =

Australian rules footballer (1936–2010)

Personal information
- Full name: Albert Keith Outen
- Born: 19 February 1936
- Died: 24 November 2010 (aged 74)
- Original team: Trinity Grammar
- Height: 175 cm (5 ft 9 in)
- Weight: 87 kg (192 lb)

Playing career^{1}
Years	Club	Games (Goals)
1954	Footscray	2 (0)
- ^{1} Playing statistics correct to the end of 1954.

Albert Keith "Alby" Outen (19 February 1936 – 24 November 2010) was an Australian rules footballer who played for the Footscray Football Club in the Victorian Football League (VFL).

== Family ==
The son of Albert Henry "Alby" Outen (1902-1972), and Eva Grace Outen (1903-1996), née Brown, Albert Keith "Alby" Outen was born on 19 February 1936.

- His father, "Alby" Outen, played for Footscray in both the VFA and the VFL.
- His uncle, Charles Whynam "Wyn" Outen (1880-1964), played for St Klda in the VFL and for Williamstown in the VFA; Wyn played (alongside his brother Matt) in the Willamstown First XVIII team that won the 1907 VFA premiership.
- His uncle, William Matthew "Matt" Outen (1883-1930), also played for St Kilda in the VFL and Williamstown in the VFA.
- His uncle, John Edward "Jack" Outen (1890-1963), played in one First XVIII game for Williamstown (alongside his brother Matt) in 1909.
- His uncle, Percy Ernest Hatherley Outen (1898-1986), played in 5 First XVIII games for Williamstown in the VFA in 1928.
- His cousin, Reginald Whynam Outen (1913-1999), the son of Wyn Outen, was an emergency in Williamstown's 1939 premiership team, after earlier playing with Collingwood and Melbourne Seconds.

He married Margaret Jill Vanthoff (1938-) in 1958.

== Education ==
He was educated at Trinity Grammar School.

== Football ==
=== Footscray (VFL) ===
In August 1953, he was playing with the Footscray Second XVIII.

In 1954, aged 18, he played in 2 games for the Footscray First XVIII: as 20th man against Essendon on 22 May 1954, and as 20th man, against Fitzroy on 5 June 1954.

=== Williamstown (VFA) ===
He played in his first game for the Williamstown First XVIII, against Box Hill, on 25 June 1955.

Playing in the back-pocket, he was one of Williamstown's best players in its come-from-behind Grand Final win against Port Melbourne on 24 September 1955.

Two weeks after his final First XVIII game for Willamstown, against Yarraville on 16 June 1958, Outen announced his retirement.

=== Representative football (VFA) ===
He played representative interstate football for the VFA in the 13th Australian National Football Carnival held in Perth in June 1956, during which he sustained a shoulder injury.

In 1957, he represented the VFA in its three interstate matches:

- against a combined (N.T.F.A. & N.W.F.U.) team, at Launcestion on 13 July 1957.
- against South Australia (SANFL), at the Lakeside Oval, on 23 July 1957;
- against the SANFL team, at Norwood Oval, on 20 August 1957.
