= Len Sallis =

Personal information
- Full name: Leonard Dalwood Sallis
- Born: 20 August 1904
- Died: c. 1989
- Original team: Black Forest
- Height: 5.9 ft (180 cm)
- Weight: 11 st (154 lb; 70 kg)
- Position: Centre

Playing career
Years	Club	Games (Goals)
1924–35	Glenelg	172 (37)

Representative team honours
Years	Team	Games (Goals)
	South Australia	13 (14)

Career highlights
- Glenelg best and fairest: 1926, 30, 31, 33 & 34; Glenelg captain: 1928; Glenelg premiership player: 1934; South Australian Football Hall of Fame: 2002 inductee

Leonard Dalwood Sallis (20 August 1904 – c. 1989) was an Australian rules footballer for Glenelg in the South Australian National Football League during the 1920s and 1930s.

== Football career ==
Born in the Adelaide suburb of Payneham, Sallis was a junior with the city's Black Forest club and joined Glenelg "B" in 1923, before making his senior debut the following season.

Sallis could play as a centre, half-forward and half-back. His honours at Glenelg included five best and fairest awards, the club captaincy in 1928, a place on their 1934 premiership team and two runner-up finishes in the Magarey Medal. He obtained 13 caps for South Australia and was amongst the state's best performers at the 1930 Adelaide Carnival, where he won their award for "most useful" player.

In 2002, Sallis was inducted into the South Australian Football Hall of Fame.

== Personal life ==
Sallis was married to wife Muriel in 1929 and the couple had two sons.
