= Harry Coy =

Australian rules footballer (1900–1962)

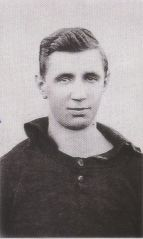

Personal information
- Full name: Henry Frederick Coy
- Born: 4 February 1900; East Melbourne, Victoria
- Died: 17 July 1962 (aged 62); Sandringham, Victoria
- Original teams: Scotch College, Port Melbourne
- Height: 178 cm (5 ft 10 in)
- Weight: 75 kg (165 lb)
- Position: Defender

Playing career^{1}
Years	Club	Games (Goals)
1921–1928	Melbourne	115 (4)

Representative team honours^{2}
Years	Team	Games (Goals)
1921, 1923	Victoria	
- ^{1} Playing statistics correct to the end of 1928.^{2} Representative statistics correct as of 1923.

Henry Frederick "Harry" Coy (4 February 1900 – 17 July 1962) was an Australian rules footballer who played for Melbourne in the Victorian Football League (VFL) during the 1920s.

Coy, who started his career at Port Melbourne in 1919, was signed up by Melbourne after two Victorian Football Association (VFA) seasons. He became Melbourne's full-back and was an important player in the 1926 premiership team. In the 1926 Grand Final, Coy kept Collingwood's Gordon Coventry to just two goals, despite the forward having kicked 81 goals for the year leading into the game.
