= Ray Usher =

Australian rules footballer (1904–1964)

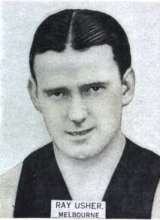

Personal information
- Full name: Ray Usher
- Born: 16 October 1904
- Died: 15 April 1964 (aged 59)
- Original teams: Ebden Rovers, Wangaratta, Albury, Coburg, Eastern Suburbs
- Height: 174 cm (5 ft 9 in)
- Weight: 74 kg (163 lb)
- Position: Wing / Centre

Playing career^{1}
Years	Club	Games (Goals)
1928–33	Melbourne	82 (2)
- ^{1} Playing statistics correct to the end of 1933.

Ray Usher (16 October 1904 – 15 April 1964) was an Australian rules footballer who played with Melbourne in the Victorian Football League (VFL).

Usher played with the Ebden Rovers Football Club in their losing grand final against Hume Weir FC in the Albury & Border Football Association in 1923.

In 1924, Usher commenced the season playing with the Wangaratta Football Club in the Ovens & Murray Football League., but by June was playing with the Albury Football Club. In August, 1924, Usher was disqualified until the end of the season. Usher played with Albury once again in 1925.

Usher trained with Richmond Football Club in early, 1926, but ended up playing with Coburg Football Club in 1926.

In 1927, Usher played with the Eastern Suburbs Football Club premiership side, defeating Newtown in the Sydney competition.

Usher made his VFL debut against Footscray in round eleven, 1928 at the Melbourne Cricket Ground.

Usher went onto represent Victoria five times during his VFL career.

Usher trained with Hawthorn in early 1934, before being appointed as the playing coach at Golden Point, Ballarat in 1934 and the following year moved to Tasmania, where he coached Lefroy in 1935, then coached Burnie from 1936 to 1940, being runners up in 1936, then winning the 1937 and 1939 premierships.

== See also ==
- 1927 Melbourne Carnival
