= George Jerram =

Australian rules footballer and coach

Personal information
- Full name: George Henry William Jerram
- Born: 15 August 1904
- Died: 20 May 1948 (aged 43); Prince Henry's Hospital, Melbourne
- Original team: Queenscliff Garrison Artillery
- Height: 185 cm (6 ft 1 in)
- Weight: 89 kg (196 lb)

Playing career^{1}
| Years | Club | Games (Goals) |
| 1926–1929 | Geelong (VFL) | 67 (31) |
| 1930–1935 | North Melbourne (VFL) | 77 (10) |
| 1936–1938 | Williamstown (VFA) | 45 (19) |
| Total | | 189 (60) |
- ^{1} Playing statistics correct to the end of 1935.

George Henry William Jerram (15 August 1904 – 20 May 1948) was an Australian rules footballer who played with Geelong and North Melbourne in the Victorian Football League (VFL), and with Williamstown in the Victorian Football Association (VFA).

== Football ==
Jerrem, a utility, was used as a half forward flanker, back pocket and in the ruck during his career.

=== Geelong (VFL) ===
An interstate player in just his second season, Jerram represented the VFL in the 1927 Melbourne Carnival. He also finished equal sixth in the Brownlow Medal that year, after a good season with Geelong.

=== North Melbourne (VFL) ===
In 1930 he switched to North Melbourne and didn't miss a game in his first two seasons. He made his last appearance with North Melbourne in 1935.

In 144 VFL games, Jerram was never reported by the umpires and off the field worked as a policeman. After leaving the police force, Jerram became a boiler attendant.

=== Williamstown (VFA) ===
In 1936, he transferred to Williamstown, who he captain-coached in 1938, and played in 45 games over three seasons (1936-1938). He was vice-captain in 1936 and 1937 under the captain-coaching of former North Melbourne teammate, Neville Huggins, before taking over the role the following season.

== Death ==
He died in 1948, from a fractured skull as well as other injuries sustained when he fell on a South Melbourne footpath. Accounts of how he fell varied, with the inquest having an open finding, unable to determine whether it was accidental or as a result of an alleged brawl.

== See also ==
- 1927 Melbourne Carnival
