= Matt Outen =

Australian rules footballer (1883–1930)

Personal information
- Full name: William Matthew Outen
- Born: 2 July 1883; Williamstown, Victoria
- Died: 27 January 1930 (aged 46); Williamstown, Victoria
- Original team: Williamstown

Playing career^{1}
| Years | Club | Games (Goals) |
| 1910–11 | St Kilda | 27 (7) |
- ^{1} Playing statistics correct to the end of 1911.

William Matthew Outen (2 July 1883 – 27 January 1930) was an Australian rules footballer who played with St Kilda in the Victorian Football League (VFL) and Williamstown in the Victorian Football Association (VFA).

== Family ==
The second of the six children of Charles George Outen (1856-1929), and Bridget Outen, née Cross, William Matthew Outen was born at Williamstown, Victoria on 2 July 1883.

- His brother, Charles Whynam "Wyn" Outen (1880-1964), played for St Klda in the VFL and for Williamstown in the VFA; Wyn played (alongside his brother Matt) in the Willamstown First XVIII team that won the 1907 VFA premiership.
- His brother, John Edward "Jack" Outen (1890-1963), played in one First XVIII game for Williamstown (alongside his brother Matt) in 1909.
- His brother, Percy Ernest Hatherley Outen (1898-1986), played in 5 First XVIII games for Williamstown in the VFA in 1928.
- His brother, Albert Henry "Alby" Outen (1902-1972), played for Footscray in both the VFA and the VFL.
- His nephew, Reginald Whynam Outen (1913-1999), the son of Wyn Outen, was an emergency in Williamstown's 1939 premiership team, after earlier playing with Collingwood and Melbourne Seconds.
- His nephew, Albert Keith "Alby" Outen (1936-2010), the son of Alby Outen, played 2 games with Footscray in 1954 before transferring to Williamstown and playing in their 1955 and 1956 premiership teams.

He married Lucy Elizabeth Guthrie (1869-1940), née Buchanan, the former Mrs. James Hickey Guthrie, in 1917.

== Death ==
He died at Williamstown, Victoria on 27 January 1930.
