= Martin Brown (footballer) =

Australian rules footballer

Personal information
- Full name: Martin James Brown
- Born: 27 February 1900; Richmond, Victoria
- Died: 13 June 1988 (aged 88); Caulfield South, Victoria
- Height: 187 cm (6 ft 2 in)
- Weight: 77 kg (170 lb)
- Position: Half Forward

Playing career^{1}
Years	Club	Games (Goals)
1921–1925, 1927–1928	South Melbourne	73 (38)
- ^{1} Playing statistics correct to the end of 1928.

Martin James Brown (27 February 1900 – 13 June 1988) was an Australian rules footballer who played with South Melbourne in the Victorian Football League (VFL).

== See also ==
- 1927 Melbourne Carnival
