= Gordon Hellwig =

Australian rules footballer, born 1901

Personal information
- Full name: Gordon Hellwig
- Born: 5 February 1901
- Died: 24 May 1964 (aged 63)
- Height: 185 cm (6 ft 1 in)
- Weight: 85 kg (187 lb)
- Position: Half-forward / centre half-back

Playing career^{1}
Years	Club	Games (Goals)
1925–28	Fitzroy	51 (28)
- ^{1} Playing statistics correct to the end of 1928.

Gordon Hellwig (5 February 1901 – 24 May 1964) was an Australian rules footballer who played with Fitzroy in the Victorian Football League (VFL).

He transferred to Williamstown in the VFA in 1929 and played 60 games and kicked 51 goals up until he injured his knee in a charity match against the VFL in June 1932 and never played again. He was captain-coach for part of the 1931 VFA season. and was captain in 1932 until he injured his knee.

== See also ==
- 1927 Melbourne Carnival
