= Jack Hayes (footballer, born 1907) =

Australian rules footballer

Personal information
- Full name: John Hayes
- Born: 15 March 1907; Newtown, New South Wales
- Died: 13 April 1971 (aged 64); Concord, New South Wales
- Original team: South Sydney
- Height: 181 cm (5 ft 11 in)
- Weight: 79 kg (174 lb)

Playing career^{1}
| Years | Club | Games (Goals) |
| 1931 | Footscray | 13 (7) |
- ^{1} Playing statistics correct to the end of 1931.

John Hayes (15 March 1907 – 13 April 1971) was an Australian rules footballer who played with Footscray in the Victorian Football League (VFL).

== Family ==
The son of John Hayes, and Ellen Hayes, née Morrissey, John Hayes was born at Newtown, New South Wales on 15 March 1907.

== Football ==
=== South Sydney AFC ===
He played with the South Sydney Australian Football Club for six seasons (1925–1930).

=== Footscray (VFL) ===
Cleared from South Sydney in March 1931, he played in 13 matches for the Footscray First XVIII in 1931.

=== St George AFC ===
Cleared from Footscray on 20 April 1932, he returned to Sydney and played with the St George Australian Football Club for four seasons (1932–1935).

== Military service ==
He enlisted in the Second AIF on 10 December 1941.

== Death ==
He died at the Concord Repatriation General Hospital on 13 April 1971.

== See also ==
- 1927 Melbourne Carnival
- 1930 Adelaide Carnival
