= Charlie Gaudion =

Australian rules footballer (1904–1979)

- Charlie Gaudion in 1963

Personal information
- Full name: Charles Henry Gaudion
- Born: 14 April 1904; Footscray, Victoria
- Died: 24 September 1979 (aged 75); Midland, Western Australia
- Original team: North Melbourne Juniors
- Height: 180 cm (5 ft 11 in)
- Weight: 87 kg (192 lb)

Playing career^{1}
Years	Club	Games (Goals)
1926–1929	Footscray	63 (7)
1931–1937	North Melbourne	77 (9)
Total		140 (16)

Coaching career
Years	Club	Games (W–L–D)
1956–1957	North Melbourne	36 (11–25–0)
- ^{1} Playing statistics correct to the end of 1937.

Charles Henry Gaudion (14 April 1904 – 24 September 1979) was an Australian rules footballer who played with Footscray and North Melbourne in the Victorian Football League (VFL).

== Family ==
The son of John Richard Gaudion (1878-1914), and Margaret Robina Parkhill Gaudion (1884-1964), née Cunningham, Charles Henry Gaudion was born at Footscray on 14 April 1904.

He married Mary Monica Agnes "Molly" Kelly (1912-1961), in Footscray, on 22 July 1933. He was the father of North Melbourne player Michael Gaudion (1938-2021) and VFL umpire Charles Joseph "Barry" Gaudion, the brother of Yarraville, North Melbourne, Geelong, and Coburg footballer John Donald "Jack" Gaudion (1910-1993), and the nephew of Collingwood footballer Francis Charles "Frank" Gaudion (1882-1952).

== Football ==
=== Footscray (VFL) ===
Gaudion was a key position player and began his career in 1926 at Footscray.

=== Coburg (VFA) ===
He played with the club for four seasons before moving to the Victorian Football Association (VFA) where he signed with Coburg.

=== North Melbourne (VFL) ===
After just a year at Coburg he returned to the league and played with North Melbourne, becoming a regular in their side during the 1930s.

=== Interstate football ===
He was also a regular for Victoria at interstate football, playing every year from 1932 to 1936, the last as captain.

=== West Adelaide (SANFL) ===
In 1940 he was captain-coach of West Adelaide.

== Coach ==
In both 1956 and 1957 he coached North Melbourne, many of those games involving his son Michael.

== VFL Tribunal ==
In the 1960s he served as players' advocate at the VFL Tribunal.

== Death ==
He died at the Marshall Park Nursing Home in the Perth suburb of Midland on 24 September 1979.

== See also ==
- 1927 Melbourne Carnival
