= Harry Pollock =

Australian rules footballer (1897–1965)

Personal information
- Full name: Henry Clyde Pollock
- Born: 15 May 1897; Richmond, Victoria
- Died: 8 March 1965 (aged 67); Parkville, Victoria

Playing career^{1}
Years	Club	Games (Goals)
1923–24, 1926	Richmond	16 (3)
- ^{1} Playing statistics correct to the end of 1926.

Henry Clyde Pollock (15 May 1897 – 8 March 1965) was an Australian rules footballer who played with Richmond in the Victorian Football League (VFL).

== Family ==
The son of John Bell Pollock (1860-1911), and Isabella Pollock (1859-1935), née Hiddleston, Henry Clyde Pollock was born on 15 May 1897 at Richmond, Victoria.

He married Alice Isabel "Lal" Hardy (1904-1998) in 1927.

== Football ==
=== Richmond (VFL) ===
In his seven seasons with Richmond (1920-1926) he played in 91 games with the Second XVIII, kicking 32 goals, and was the team's captain in 1925.

He also played in 16 First XVIII games, kicking 3 goals, as well as one game for a representative VFL team, at Albury, on 31 July 1926, against a combined team from the Ovens & Murray League.

His last game for Richmond was at centre half-forward for the Second XVIII team that lost the 1926 Semi-Final to South Melbourne, 11.5 (71) to 10.18 (78), on 18 September 1926.

=== Ulverstone (NWFU) ===
Replacing Checker Hughes, who had returned to the mainland to coach Richmond, Pollock was appointed captain-coach of the Ulverstone Football Club, in Tasmania's North West Football Union in 1927, during which time he represented Tasmania at the 1927 Melbourne Carnival.

=== Murtoa (MWFL) ===
Cleared by Richmond FC to Murtoa on 25 April 1928, he transferred to the Murtoa Football Club in the Mid-Wimmera Football League. He played with Murtoa for seven seasons (1928-1933, 1935), including the 1932 Dunmunkle Football League premiership side -- 73 games, 30 goals -- was captain-coach for two seasons (1928-1929), and non-playing coach for two seasons (1933, 1935).

== Death ==
He died at Parkville, Victoria on 8 March 1965.

== See also ==
- 1927 Melbourne Carnival
