= Wyn Outen =

Australian rules footballer (1880–1964)

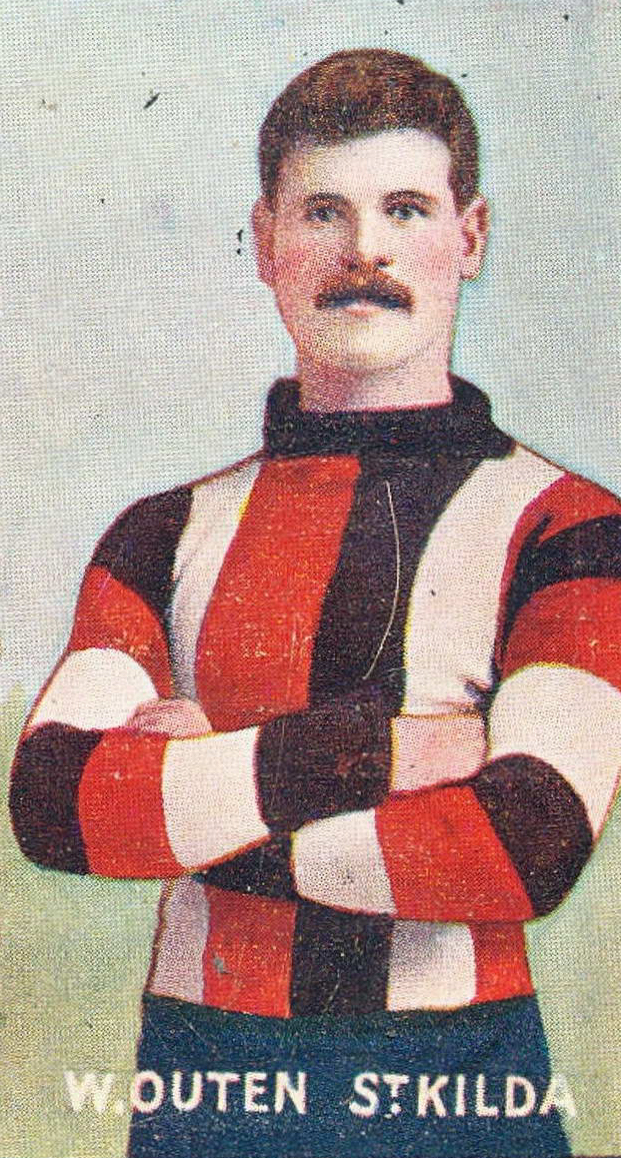
- Cigarette card of Outen in 1907

Personal information
- Full name: Charles Whynam Outen
- Born: 23 May 1880; Williamstown, Victoria
- Died: 10 November 1964 (aged 84); Glen Huntly, Victoria
- Original team: Williamstown
- Position: Centre

Playing career^{1}
Years	Club	Games (Goals)
1903–05, 1907	St Kilda	54 (3)
- ^{1} Playing statistics correct to the end of 1907.

Charles Whynam "Wyn" Outen (23 May 1880 – 10 November 1964) was an Australian rules footballer who played with St Kilda in the Victorian Football League (VFL).

== Family ==
The eldest of the six children of Charles George Outen (1856–1929), and Bridget Outen, née Cross, Charles Whynam Outen was born at Williamstown, Victoria on 23 May 1880.

- His brother, William Matthew "Matt" Outen (1883–1930), played for St Kilda in the VFL and Williamstown in the VFA; Matt played with Wyn in the Williamstown First XVIII team that won the 1907 VFA premiership.
- His brother, John Edward "Jack" Outen (1890–1963), played in one First XVIII game for Williamstown (alongside his brother Matt) in 1909.
- His brother, Percy Ernest Hatherley Outen (1898–1986), played in 5 First XVIII games for Williamstown in the VFA in 1928.
- His brother, Albert Henry "Alby" Outen (1902–1972), played for Footscray in both the VFA and the VFL.
- His son, Reginald Whynam Outen (1913–1999), was an emergency in Williamstowns 1939 premiership team, after earlier playing with Collingwood and Melbourne Seconds.
- His nephew, Albert Keith "Alby" Outen (1936–2010), Albert's son, played 2 games with Footscray in 1954 before transferring to Williamstown and playing in their 1955 and 1956 premiership teams.

He married Priscilla Louise Dainton (1884–1968) in 1913.

== Football ==
=== Williamstown (VFA) ===
Outen originally played with Williamstown in the VFA from 1899 to 1901.

=== St Kilda (VFL) ===
He was cleared from Williamstown to St Kilda on 17 April 1903.

In early 1906 he was given 12-month leave of absence from his employment at the Newport Railway Workshops "to visit Western Australia"; and, in June 1906 it was reported that he was "now playing football in West Australia".

By April 1907 he had returned to the Newport Workshops, and was captain of a Workshops team that played against Williamstown in a pre-season practice match. He returned to play for the St Kilda First XVIII in the first match of the 1907 season, against Carlton, at Princes Park, on 27 April 1907.

=== Williamstown (VFA) ===
He was cleared from St KIlda to Williamstown in July 1907. He returned there after his time with the Saints in 1907 to vice-captain and star in the centre in 'Town's 18-point premiership victory that year over West Melbourne, the first flag in Williamstowns history. He captained the team in 1908 & 1909 and finished up with 99 games and 19 goals up until the end of 1909.

== Cricket ==
He was an excellent cricketer, playing for the Williamstown Cricket Club for a number of years. He represented the "Locomotive Department of Victoria" in an Intercolonial match against the "Locomotive Department of South Australia" in December 1898.

== Death ==
He died on 10 November 1964.
