= Bob Chadwick =

Australian rules footballer

Personal information
- Full name: Robert Edward Chadwick
- Born: 8 February 1927
- Died: 5 June 1992 (aged 65)
- Original team: Melbourne Grammar

Playing career^{1}
Years	Club	Games (Goals)
1949	Melbourne	2 (0)
- ^{1} Playing statistics correct to the end of 1949.

Bob Chadwick (8 February 1927 – 5 June 1992) was an Australian rules footballer who played with Melbourne in the Victorian Football League (VFL).

== Family ==
Robert Edward Chadwick was the son of Albert Chadwick.
