= Bill Tymms =

Australian rules footballer, born 1903

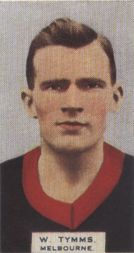

Personal information
- Full name: William Tymms
- Born: 16 August 1903
- Died: 9 June 1989 (aged 85)
- Original team: C.Y.M.S
- Height: 183 cm (6 ft 0 in)
- Weight: 79 kg (174 lb)

Playing career^{1}
Years	Club	Games (Goals)
1922–1923	St Kilda	8 (5)
1925–1933	Melbourne	91 (7)
Total		99 (12)
- ^{1} Playing statistics correct to the end of 1933.

William Tymms (16 August 1903 – 9 June 1989) was an Australian rules footballer who played with St Kilda and Melbourne in the Victorian Football League (VFL).

Tymms started his career at St Kilda, where he spent two seasons. He played for Prahran in 1924, then made his way to Melbourne and was a half-back flanker in their 1926 premiership team. Best known as a full-back, Tymms represented the VFL five times during his career. He went into football administration after retiring, serving as secretary of the Richmond Football Club from 1955 to 1962.
