= Charlie May (footballer) =

Australian rules footballer and coach (1899–1989)

Personal information
- Full name: Charles May
- Born: 17 February 1899; Queensland
- Died: 2 May 1989 (aged 90); Norwood, South Australia
- Original team: North Melbourne
- Height: 178 cm (5 ft 10 in)
- Weight: 67 kg (148 lb)

Playing career^{1}
Years	Club	Games (Goals)
1919	North Melbourne (VFA)	4 (4)
1919–1921	Brunswick (VFA)	44 (24)
1922–1926	Essendon	84 (3)

Coaching career
Years	Club	Games (W–L–D)
1934–1935	Essendon	36 (12–24–0)
1955-1957	Glenelg	53 (19–33–1)
- ^{1} Playing statistics correct to the end of 1957.

Charles Francis "Chooka" May (17 February 1899 – 2 May 1989) was an Australian rules footballer who played with and coached Essendon in the Victorian Football League (VFL). He was the father of double Essendon premiership player Wally May.

A centreman in his playing days, May was a member of Essendon's back to back premiership sides of 1923 and 1924. His last game of football was in the 1926 finals series where Essendon fell a goal short of qualifying for the Grand Final and May ended up with a suspension for striking Bob Corbett of Melbourne. He was non-playing coach of Essendon in 1934 and 1935 and it his later years remained involved with the club as a trainer. May also spent time in South Australia where he coached Glenelg Football Club.
