= James Chapman (footballer) =

Australian rules footballer (1932–1993)

Personal information
- Full name: James Euan Chapman
- Born: 6 November 1932
- Died: 11 December 1993 (aged 61); Leongatha
- Original team: Melbourne High School Old Boys
- Height: 182 cm (6 ft 0 in)
- Weight: 81 kg (179 lb)

Playing career^{1}
Years	Club	Games (Goals)
1954–56	Fitzroy	14 (1)
- ^{1} Playing statistics correct to the end of 1956.

James Euan Chapman (6 November 1932 – 11 December 1993) was an Australian rules footballer who played with Fitzroy in the Victorian Football League (VFL).
