= Jack Charlesworth (footballer) =

Australian rules footballer

- Born: John Edwin Charlesworth; 14 September 1895
- Died: 15 February 1960 (aged 64)

John Edwin Charlesworth (14 September 1895 – 15 February 1960) was an Australian rules footballer who played in Tasmania during the 1910s and 1920s and also represented the state in interstate matches. He was inducted into the Tasmanian Football Hall of Fame in 2005.

Charlesworth played for Cananore in the Tasmanian Football League (TFL).

== See also ==
- 1927 Melbourne Carnival
