= George White (footballer, born 1908) =

Australian rules footballer, born 1908

Personal information
- Full name: George White
- Born: 20 September 1908
- Died: 9 March 1966 (aged 57)
- Original team: South Fremantle
- Height: 175 cm (5 ft 9 in)
- Weight: 77 kg (170 lb)
- Position: Centre / Defence

Playing career^{1}
Years	Club	Games (Goals)
1931	St Kilda	13 (6)
- ^{1} Playing statistics correct to the end of 1931.

George White (20 September 1908 – 9 March 1966) was an Australian rules footballer who played with St Kilda in the Victorian Football League (VFL).
