= Roy Thompson (footballer) =

Australian rules footballer, born 1905

Personal information
- Full name: James McIlroy Thompson
- Born: 18 February 1905; Footscray, Victoria
- Died: 1 June 1981 (aged 76); Lilydale, Victoria
- Original team: Queenscliff Garrison Artillery
- Height: 177 cm (5 ft 10 in)
- Weight: 78 kg (172 lb)
- Position: Half back Flank

Playing career^{1}
Years	Club	Games (Goals)
1926–29	Footscray	47 (0)
- ^{1} Playing statistics correct to the end of 1929.

James McIlroy Thompson (18 February 1905 – 1 June 1981) was an Australian rules footballer who played with Footscray in the Victorian Football League (VFL).

Thompson served in the Garrison Artillery at Queenscliff before joining the Royal Australian Air Force during World War II.

== See also ==
- 1927 Melbourne Carnival
