= Bob Corbett (footballer) =

Australian rules footballer and umpire

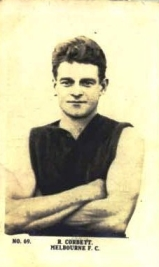

Personal information
- Full name: Robert James Corbett
- Born: 23 November 1895; Creswick, Victoria
- Died: 10 June 1957 (aged 61); Footscray, Victoria
- Original team: Golden Point
- Height: 178 cm (5 ft 10 in)
- Weight: 76 kg (168 lb)

Playing career^{1}
Years	Club	Games (Goals)
1920–1929	Melbourne	161 (9)
- ^{1} Playing statistics correct to the end of 1929.

Robert "Bob" Corbett (23 November 1895 – 10 June 1957) was an Australian rules footballer who played with Melbourne in the Victorian Football League (VFL).

== Football ==
Corbett, a centreman, came originally from Ballarat team Golden Point and was already 24 by the time he made his VFL debut in 1920. He was a constant fixture in the Melbourne side during the 1920s and a regular interstate representative.

Just before half time in the 1926 Preliminary Final, Corbett was struck in the face and knocked to the ground by Essendon player Charlie May. Despite returning to the field later in the game, he missed out on playing in Melbourne's premiership win the following week, diagnosed with a broken jaw. A side result of this incident was the eventual introduction of a reserve that could replace injured players.

He acted as VFL boundary umpire after retiring and officiated in 40 matches from 1931 to 1933.

== See also ==
- 1927 Melbourne Carnival
