= Alfred Ryan =

Australian sportsman (1904–1990)

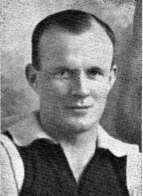
- Ryan in the 1920s

Personal information
- Full name: Alfred James Ryan
- Born: 27 April 1904; Adelaide, South Australia
- Died: 10 July 1990 (aged 86); Semaphore South, South Australia
- Batting: Right-handed
- Bowling: Right-arm medium
- Role: All-rounder

Domestic team information
- Years: Team
- 1925/26–1936/37: South Australia

Career statistics
Competition	First-class
Matches	33
Runs scored	1,493
Batting average	30.46
100s/50s	2/8
Top score	144
Balls bowled	3,587
Wickets	20
Bowling average	43.30
5 wickets in innings	0
10 wickets in match	0
Best bowling	4/13
Catches/stumpings	32/–
- Source: CricketArchive, 8 October 2022

Alfred James "Bulla" Ryan (27 April 1904 – 10 July 1990) was an Australian sportsman. He represented South Australia at both first-class cricket and Australian rules football. His cricket was played mostly in the Sheffield Shield and he spent his football career with South Adelaide in the South Australian National Football League (SANFL).

== Cricket ==
Ryan, a right-hander, batted in the middle and lower order for South Australia. He was part of South Australia's 1935/36 Sheffield Shield winning campaign, captained by Don Bradman. That season, in a match against Queensland at Brisbane, Ryan made his highest first-class score of 144.

He represented an Australia XI, against the Marylebone Cricket Club at the Sydney Cricket Ground in 1936. He scored 40 not out and took the wicket of Arthur Fagg. A right-arm medium pace bowler, he had previously played against Marylebone with South Australia at Adelaide a year earlier and took career best figures of 4/13. His haul included English Test cricketer Joe Hardstaff.

In 2008 Bulla was named as a player in the team of the 20th century for the Adelaide Cricket Club.

== Football ==
Ryan was one of five brothers (including John Ryan) who played at South Adelaide during the 1920s and 1930s. Debuting in 1922, he was used initially as a key forward and topped South Adelaide's goal-kicking every season from 1924 to 1927, with over 50 goals on each occasion. A South Adelaide 'Best and fairest' winner in 1924 and 1928, Ryan finished his career as a rover. He retired in 1931, having played 146 senior games for South Adelaide and was later named as right half forward flanker in their official 'Greatest Team'.

He regularly represented South Australia at interstate football, appearing in the 1924 Hobart and 1927 Melbourne carnivals as a forward. In all he represented his state 24 times and kicked 73 goals.
