= Col Deane =

Australian rules footballer (1900–1952)

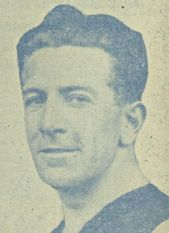

Personal information
- Full name: Colin Francis Deane
- Born: 11 July 1900; Launceston, Tasmania
- Died: 10 December 1952 (aged 52); St Kilda, Victoria
- Original team: New Town
- Height: 185 cm (6 ft 1 in)
- Weight: 86 kg (190 lb)
- Position: Rover

Playing career^{1}
Years	Club	Games (Goals)
1925–1930	Melbourne	82 (53)
1933	St Kilda	3 (0)
Total		85 (53)

Coaching career
Years	Club	Games (W–L–D)
1933	St Kilda	18 (6–12–0)
- ^{1} Playing statistics correct to the end of 1933.

Colin Francis 'Col' Deane (11 July 1900 – 10 December 1952) was an Australian rules footballer who played for Melbourne and St Kilda in the Victorian Football League (VFL).

Deane, a rover, represented Tasmania at the 1924 Hobart Carnival. He had been in the state playing for New Town but in 1925 moved to Victoria and lined up for Melbourne. In 1926 he was a member of their premiership team and in 1929 represented the VFL at interstate football.

He didn't play in 1931 as he was in New Zealand but he returned the following year as coach of Melbourne's reserves. After steering them to the premiership, St Kilda acquired his services as playing coach in 1933. Three games into the season he retired as a player and saw out the year coaching from the sidelines.
