= Lionel Hastie =

Australian rules footballer, born 1911

Personal information
- Full name: Lionel Albert Frank Hastie
- Born: 5 June 1911; Hobart, Tasmania, Australia
- Died: 9 April 1981 (aged 69); Queensland, Australia
- Original team: Newtown (Sydney)
- Height: 180 cm (5 ft 11 in)
- Weight: 76 kg (168 lb)

Playing career^{1}
Years	Club	Games (Goals)
1931	Fitzroy	13 (15)
- ^{1} Playing statistics correct to the end of 1933.

Lionel Hastie (5 June 1911 - 9 April 1981) was an Australian rules footballer, who played for the Fitzroy Football Club in the Victorian Football League (VFL).

== Career ==
Hastie played 13 games for Fitzroy in the 1931 season, and scored 15 goals.
