= Jack Sheehan (footballer) =

Australian rules footballer

Personal information
- Full name: John Joseph Sheehan
- Born: 29 May 1890; South Melbourne, Victoria
- Died: 17 June 1933 (aged 43); Heidelberg, Victoria
- Original team: St Ignatius
- Height: 165 cm (5 ft 5 in)
- Weight: 73 kg (161 lb)

Playing career^{1}
Years	Club	Games (Goals)
1911	Collingwood	3 (0)
1912	Melbourne	0 (0)
1915, 1917	Richmond	14 (0)
Total		17 (0)
- ^{1} Playing statistics correct to the end of 1917.

John Joseph Sheehan (29 May 1890 – 17 June 1933) was an Australian rules footballer who played with the Collingwood Football Club and Richmond Football Club in the Victorian Football League (VFL). He was also listed with the Melbourne Football Club, but never played a game.

== Military service ==
He enlisted in the First AIF on 12 July 1915. He did not serve overseas. He was discharged from the AIF on 6 November 1916, on medical grounds, subsequent to surgery for a rectal fistula.

== Football ==
=== New South Wales ===
He was the coach of the New South Wales team at the sixth Australian National Football Carnival, held in Melbourne in August 1927.

== See also ==
- 1927 Melbourne Carnival
