= Charlie Milburn =

Australian rules footballer

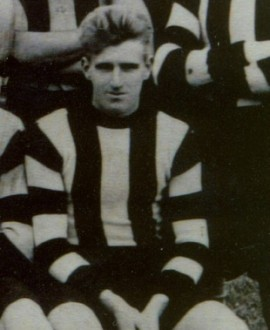
- Milburn during his Collingwood career

Personal information
- Full name: Charles Patrick Milburn
- Born: 10 March 1899; Gormanston, Tasmania
- Died: 14 November 1953 (aged 54); Mooroopna, Victoria
- Original team: Preston
- Height: 174 cm (5 ft 9 in)
- Weight: 75 kg (165 lb)
- Position: Winger

Playing career^{1}
Years	Club	Games (Goals)
1923–1927	Collingwood	60 (3)
1929	Essendon	9 (0)
Total		69 (3)
- ^{1} Playing statistics correct to the end of 1929.

Charles Patrick Milburn (10 March 1899 – 14 November 1953) was an Australian rules footballer who played for the Collingwood Football Club and Essendon Football Club in the Victorian Football League (VFL) during the 1920s.

After debuting at the start of the 1923 season, Milburn never fully established his place in the side until 1925 when he was Collingwood's second best performer at the Brownlow Medal count and appeared in their losing Grand Final team. A wingman, he participated in another losing Grand Final the following season but was a premiership player in 1927.

Milburn didn't play VFL football in 1928, however in 1929 joined Essendon and featured in their side for the second half of the year.

== Sources ==
- Holmesby, Russell and Main, Jim (2007). The Encyclopedia of AFL Footballers. 7th ed. Melbourne: Bas Publishing.
