= Stan Wittman =

Australian rules footballer

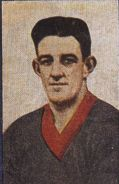

Personal information
- Born: 1 June 1901
- Died: 14 May 1994 (aged 92)
- Original team: Rosedale
- Debut: Round 3, 1924, Melbourne vs. Collingwood, at the MCG
- Height: 178 cm (5 ft 10 in)
- Weight: 76 kg (168 lb)

Playing career^{1}
| Years | Club | Games (Goals) |
| 1924–1931 | Melbourne | 109 (132) |
- ^{1} Playing statistics correct to the end of 1931.

Stan "Bunny" Wittman (1 June 1901 – 14 May 1994) was an Australian rules footballer who played for Melbourne in the VFL during the late 1920s and early 1930s.

Wittman, who came to Melbourne from Rosedale, played his football across half forward. He was a member of Melbourne's 1926 premiership and kicked three goals in the Grand Final. Two years later, Wittman kicked a career best season tally of 34 goals, helped by a six-goal haul against North Melbourne at the MCG.

Wittman was made a life member of the Melbourne Football Club in 1992. He died in May 1994, the last surviving member of the team that won the 1926 premiership.
