= 1926 VFL season =

30th season of the Victorian Football League (VFL)

1926 VFL premiership season
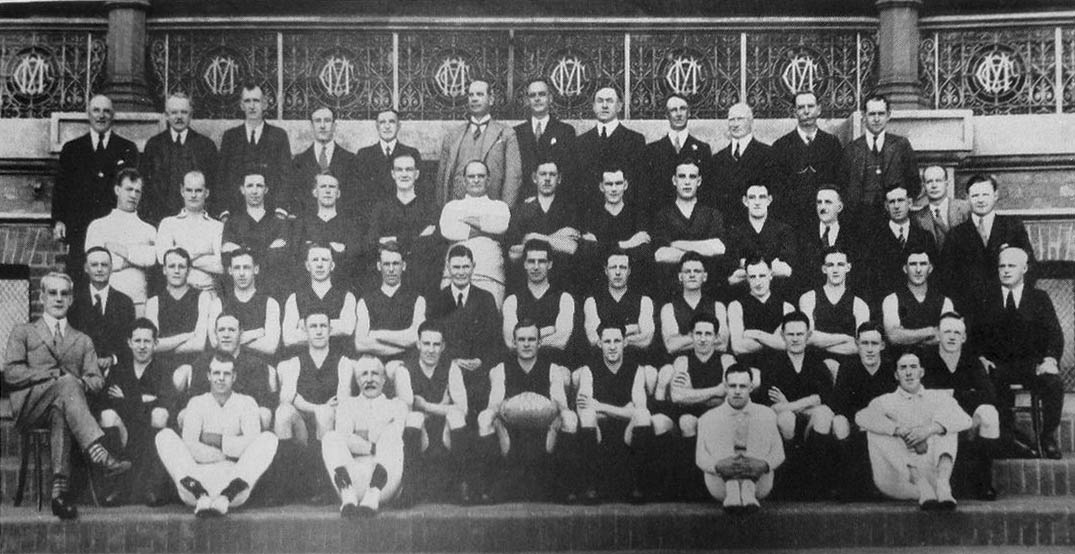
- Melbourne 1926 VFL premiership team

Overview
- Date: 1 May – 9 October 1926
- Teams: 12
- Premiers: Melbourne; 2nd premiership
- Runners-up: Collingwood; 9th runners-up result
- Minor premiers: Collingwood; 8th minor premiership
- Brownlow Medallist: Ivor Warne-Smith (Melbourne); 9 votes
- Leading goalkicker medallist: Gordon Coventry (Collingwood); 78 goals

Attendance
- Matches played: 112
- Total attendance: 1,966,841 (17,561 per match)
- Highest (H&A): 32,475 (round 15, Melbourne v Collingwood)
- Highest (finals): 59,632 (grand final, Collingwood v Melbourne)

The 1926 VFL season was the 30th season of the Victorian Football League (VFL), the highest-level senior Australian rules football competition in Victoria. The season featured twelve clubs and ran from 1 May to 9 October, comprising an 18-match home-and-away season followed by a four-week finals series featuring the top four clubs.

Melbourne won the premiership, defeating Collingwood by 57 points in the 1926 VFL grand final; it was Melbourne's second VFL premiership. Collingwood won the minor premiership by finishing atop the home-and-away ladder with a 15–3 win–loss record. Melbourne's Ivor Warne-Smith won the Brownlow Medal as the league's best and fairest player, and Collingwood's Gordon Coventry won the leading goalkicker medal as the league's leading goalkicker.

== Background ==
In 1926, the VFL competition consisted of twelve teams of 18 on-the-field players each, with no "reserves", although any of the 18 players who had left the playing field for any reason could later resume their place on the field at any time during the match.

Teams played each other in a home-and-away season of 18 rounds; matches 12 to 17 were the "home-and-way reverse" of matches 1 to 6, and match 18 the "home-and-away reverse" of match 9.

Once the 18 round home-and-away season had finished, the 1926 VFL Premiers were determined by the specific format and conventions of the amended "Argus system".

== Home-and-away season ==
=== Round 1 ===
Home team	Home team score	Away team	Away team score	Venue	Crowd	Date
Melbourne	13.14 (92)	St Kilda	8.15 (63)	MCG	18,742	1 May 1926
Essendon	15.14 (104)	North Melbourne	6.17 (53)	Windy Hill	15,000	1 May 1926
South Melbourne	11.11 (77)	Richmond	12.13 (85)	Lake Oval	20,000	1 May 1926
Geelong	13.15 (93)	Footscray	3.9 (27)	Corio Oval	15,000	1 May 1926
Fitzroy	7.13 (55)	Collingwood	14.10 (94)	Brunswick Street Oval	25,000	1 May 1926
Hawthorn	6.14 (50)	Carlton	9.16 (70)	Glenferrie Oval	16,000	1 May 1926

=== Round 2 ===
Home team	Home team score	Away team	Away team score	Venue	Crowd	Date
Footscray	8.9 (57)	South Melbourne	13.12 (90)	Western Oval	15,000	8 May 1926
Collingwood	6.11 (47)	Essendon	10.18 (78)	Victoria Park	25,000	8 May 1926
Carlton	9.15 (69)	Melbourne	8.10 (58)	Princes Park	18,000	8 May 1926
North Melbourne	5.8 (38)	Hawthorn	5.12 (42)	Arden Street Oval	7,000	8 May 1926
St Kilda	15.15 (105)	Geelong	16.14 (110)	Junction Oval	20,000	8 May 1926
Richmond	18.8 (116)	Fitzroy	8.10 (58)	Punt Road Oval	22,000	8 May 1926

=== Round 3 ===
Home team	Home team score	Away team	Away team score	Venue	Crowd	Date
Melbourne	17.17 (119)	North Melbourne	14.5 (89)	MCG	9,495	15 May 1926
Fitzroy	11.13 (79)	Footscray	11.12 (78)	Brunswick Street Oval	15,000	15 May 1926
Essendon	10.9 (69)	Richmond	8.13 (61)	Windy Hill	30,000	15 May 1926
South Melbourne	6.11 (47)	St Kilda	6.14 (50)	Lake Oval	23,000	15 May 1926
Hawthorn	6.11 (47)	Collingwood	17.17 (119)	Glenferrie Oval	13,000	15 May 1926
Geelong	9.10 (64)	Carlton	8.12 (60)	Corio Oval	18,000	15 May 1926

=== Round 4 ===
Home team	Home team score	Away team	Away team score	Venue	Crowd	Date
Collingwood	12.12 (84)	Melbourne	12.7 (79)	Victoria Park	15,000	22 May 1926
Carlton	10.11 (71)	South Melbourne	9.12 (66)	Princes Park	25,000	22 May 1926
Richmond	16.16 (112)	Hawthorn	14.16 (100)	Punt Road Oval	14,000	22 May 1926
North Melbourne	7.8 (50)	Geelong	7.16 (58)	Arden Street Oval	14,000	22 May 1926
St Kilda	9.8 (62)	Fitzroy	7.9 (51)	Junction Oval	22,000	22 May 1926
Footscray	7.5 (47)	Essendon	6.13 (49)	Western Oval	20,000	22 May 1926

=== Round 5 ===
Home team	Home team score	Away team	Away team score	Venue	Crowd	Date
Melbourne	19.8 (122)	Richmond	12.17 (89)	MCG	28,628	29 May 1926
Essendon	13.7 (85)	St Kilda	5.8 (38)	Windy Hill	20,000	29 May 1926
South Melbourne	10.15 (75)	North Melbourne	11.7 (73)	Lake Oval	15,000	29 May 1926
Hawthorn	9.13 (67)	Footscray	14.16 (100)	Glenferrie Oval	10,000	29 May 1926
Geelong	9.14 (68)	Collingwood	10.15 (75)	Corio Oval	19,500	29 May 1926
Fitzroy	7.16 (58)	Carlton	7.6 (48)	Brunswick Street Oval	25,000	29 May 1926

=== Round 6 ===
Home team	Home team score	Away team	Away team score	Venue	Crowd	Date
Footscray	6.10 (46)	Melbourne	15.15 (105)	Western Oval	16,000	5 June 1926
Collingwood	12.16 (88)	South Melbourne	8.11 (59)	Victoria Park	16,000	5 June 1926
Carlton	10.13 (73)	Essendon	6.15 (51)	Princes Park	30,000	5 June 1926
St Kilda	12.7 (79)	Hawthorn	6.14 (50)	Junction Oval	10,000	5 June 1926
Richmond	10.13 (73)	Geelong	12.11 (83)	Punt Road Oval	26,000	5 June 1926
North Melbourne	11.11 (77)	Fitzroy	11.15 (81)	Arden Street Oval	10,000	5 June 1926

=== Round 7 ===
Home team	Home team score	Away team	Away team score	Venue	Crowd	Date
North Melbourne	10.13 (73)	Richmond	10.14 (74)	Arden Street Oval	12,000	7 June 1926
Melbourne	12.16 (88)	South Melbourne	8.17 (65)	MCG	20,974	7 June 1926
Fitzroy	11.15 (81)	Hawthorn	14.12 (96)	Brunswick Street Oval	8,000	7 June 1926
Geelong	13.11 (89)	Essendon	7.9 (51)	Corio Oval	25,600	7 June 1926
St Kilda	9.12 (66)	Collingwood	10.16 (76)	Junction Oval	24,000	7 June 1926
Footscray	10.11 (71)	Carlton	14.9 (93)	Western Oval	20,000	7 June 1926

=== Round 8 ===
Home team	Home team score	Away team	Away team score	Venue	Crowd	Date
Richmond	11.19 (85)	St Kilda	9.12 (66)	Punt Road Oval	22,000	19 June 1926
Essendon	10.9 (69)	Melbourne	11.9 (75)	Windy Hill	23,000	19 June 1926
Collingwood	28.16 (184)	Footscray	8.10 (58)	Victoria Park	14,000	19 June 1926
Carlton	17.7 (109)	North Melbourne	7.10 (52)	Princes Park	20,000	19 June 1926
Hawthorn	10.12 (72)	Geelong	18.10 (118)	Glenferrie Oval	9,000	19 June 1926
South Melbourne	13.15 (93)	Fitzroy	9.5 (59)	Lake Oval	15,000	19 June 1926

=== Round 9 ===
Home team	Home team score	Away team	Away team score	Venue	Crowd	Date
North Melbourne	4.9 (33)	St Kilda	5.17 (47)	Arden Street Oval	5,000	26 June 1926
Footscray	8.8 (56)	Richmond	9.13 (67)	Western Oval	14,000	26 June 1926
Fitzroy	10.9 (69)	Geelong	12.12 (84)	Brunswick Street Oval	12,000	26 June 1926
Carlton	10.10 (70)	Collingwood	6.13 (49)	Princes Park	30,000	26 June 1926
Melbourne	21.28 (154)	Hawthorn	1.7 (13)	MCG	7,514	26 June 1926
South Melbourne	9.15 (69)	Essendon	8.9 (57)	Lake Oval	18,000	26 June 1926

=== Round 10 ===
Home team	Home team score	Away team	Away team score	Venue	Crowd	Date
Hawthorn	8.10 (58)	South Melbourne	11.16 (82)	Glenferrie Oval	10,000	3 July 1926
Geelong	8.19 (67)	Melbourne	8.5 (53)	Corio Oval	21,500	3 July 1926
St Kilda	7.17 (59)	Footscray	10.7 (67)	Junction Oval	12,500	3 July 1926
Fitzroy	6.13 (49)	Essendon	11.12 (78)	Brunswick Street Oval	13,000	3 July 1926
North Melbourne	8.5 (53)	Collingwood	10.16 (76)	Arden Street Oval	5,000	3 July 1926
Richmond	7.17 (59)	Carlton	8.6 (54)	Punt Road Oval	32,000	3 July 1926

=== Round 11 ===
Home team	Home team score	Away team	Away team score	Venue	Crowd	Date
Footscray	14.9 (93)	North Melbourne	10.8 (68)	Western Oval	12,000	10 July 1926
Essendon	11.8 (74)	Hawthorn	7.5 (47)	Windy Hill	10,000	10 July 1926
Collingwood	14.15 (99)	Richmond	5.11 (41)	Victoria Park	23,000	10 July 1926
Carlton	11.14 (80)	St Kilda	9.9 (63)	Princes Park	15,000	10 July 1926
South Melbourne	9.13 (67)	Geelong	8.8 (56)	Lake Oval	20,000	10 July 1926
Melbourne	14.15 (99)	Fitzroy	8.12 (60)	MCG	11,651	10 July 1926

=== Round 12 ===
Home team	Home team score	Away team	Away team score	Venue	Crowd	Date
Richmond	10.15 (75)	South Melbourne	16.12 (108)	Punt Road Oval	27,000	17 July 1926
Footscray	7.14 (56)	Geelong	15.17 (107)	Western Oval	17,000	17 July 1926
Collingwood	18.16 (124)	Fitzroy	11.16 (82)	Victoria Park	16,000	17 July 1926
Carlton	8.17 (65)	Hawthorn	8.9 (57)	Princes Park	12,000	17 July 1926
St Kilda	3.11 (29)	Melbourne	17.16 (118)	Junction Oval	14,000	17 July 1926
North Melbourne	4.8 (32)	Essendon	6.14 (50)	Arden Street Oval	10,000	17 July 1926

=== Round 13 ===
Home team	Home team score	Away team	Away team score	Venue	Crowd	Date
Hawthorn	10.10 (70)	North Melbourne	10.10 (70)	Glenferrie Oval	4,500	7 August 1926
Geelong	12.18 (90)	St Kilda	5.8 (38)	Corio Oval	10,500	7 August 1926
Fitzroy	10.17 (77)	Richmond	12.20 (92)	Brunswick Street Oval	10,000	7 August 1926
South Melbourne	15.17 (107)	Footscray	6.12 (48)	Lake Oval	14,000	7 August 1926
Essendon	6.10 (46)	Collingwood	10.9 (69)	Windy Hill	20,000	7 August 1926
Melbourne	12.18 (90)	Carlton	8.10 (58)	MCG	27,785	7 August 1926

=== Round 14 ===
Home team	Home team score	Away team	Away team score	Venue	Crowd	Date
St Kilda	7.11 (53)	South Melbourne	10.21 (81)	Junction Oval	15,000	14 August 1926
Collingwood	16.8 (104)	Hawthorn	3.10 (28)	Victoria Park	7,000	14 August 1926
Carlton	12.10 (82)	Geelong	10.15 (75)	Princes Park	25,000	14 August 1926
North Melbourne	10.7 (67)	Melbourne	9.16 (70)	Arden Street Oval	6,000	14 August 1926
Footscray	8.15 (63)	Fitzroy	14.21 (105)	Western Oval	10,000	14 August 1926
Richmond	8.14 (62)	Essendon	10.7 (67)	Punt Road Oval	20,000	14 August 1926

=== Round 15 ===
Home team	Home team score	Away team	Away team score	Venue	Crowd	Date
Hawthorn	10.9 (69)	Richmond	14.18 (102)	Glenferrie Oval	5,000	21 August 1926
Geelong	15.22 (112)	North Melbourne	7.6 (48)	Corio Oval	10,000	21 August 1926
Fitzroy	18.18 (126)	St Kilda	9.10 (64)	Brunswick Street Oval	7,000	21 August 1926
Essendon	18.15 (123)	Footscray	9.9 (63)	Windy Hill	8,000	21 August 1926
Melbourne	6.7 (43)	Collingwood	13.15 (93)	MCG	32,475	21 August 1926
South Melbourne	12.13 (85)	Carlton	9.8 (62)	Lake Oval	29,000	21 August 1926

=== Round 16 ===
Home team	Home team score	Away team	Away team score	Venue	Crowd	Date
North Melbourne	9.16 (70)	South Melbourne	15.16 (106)	Arden Street Oval	12,000	28 August 1926
Footscray	9.19 (73)	Hawthorn	11.14 (80)	Western Oval	5,000	28 August 1926
Collingwood	8.16 (64)	Geelong	14.13 (97)	Victoria Park	26,550	28 August 1926
Carlton	18.18 (126)	Fitzroy	15.14 (104)	Princes Park	25,000	28 August 1926
Richmond	10.8 (68)	Melbourne	13.16 (94)	Punt Road Oval	15,000	28 August 1926
St Kilda	2.11 (23)	Essendon	14.11 (95)	Junction Oval	13,000	28 August 1926

=== Round 17 ===
Home team	Home team score	Away team	Away team score	Venue	Crowd	Date
Hawthorn	10.10 (70)	St Kilda	12.14 (86)	Glenferrie Oval	5,000	4 September 1926
Geelong	19.16 (130)	Richmond	8.18 (66)	Corio Oval	11,500	4 September 1926
Fitzroy	17.18 (120)	North Melbourne	13.7 (85)	Brunswick Street Oval	6,000	4 September 1926
Melbourne	20.20 (140)	Footscray	9.14 (68)	MCG	6,684	4 September 1926
South Melbourne	8.9 (57)	Collingwood	9.9 (63)	Lake Oval	32,000	4 September 1926
Essendon	13.8 (86)	Carlton	11.11 (77)	Windy Hill	25,000	4 September 1926

=== Round 18 ===
Home team	Home team score	Away team	Away team score	Venue	Crowd	Date
Hawthorn	11.12 (78)	Melbourne	18.13 (121)	Glenferrie Oval	5,000	11 September 1926
Essendon	9.17 (71)	South Melbourne	10.14 (74)	Windy Hill	25,000	11 September 1926
St Kilda	13.12 (90)	North Melbourne	11.5 (71)	Junction Oval	6,000	11 September 1926
Richmond	6.13 (49)	Footscray	13.15 (93)	Punt Road Oval	5,000	11 September 1926
Geelong	15.14 (104)	Fitzroy	6.13 (49)	Corio Oval	14,000	11 September 1926
Collingwood	12.24 (96)	Carlton	7.5 (47)	Victoria Park	20,000	11 September 1926

== Ladder ==
(P)	Premiers
	Qualified for finals

#	Team	P	W	L	D	PF	PA	%	Pts
1	Collingwood	18	15	3	0	1604	1074	149.3	60
2	Geelong	18	15	3	0	1605	1105	145.2	60
3	Melbourne (P)	18	14	4	0	1720	1175	146.4	56
4	Essendon	18	12	6	0	1303	1048	124.3	48
5	South Melbourne	18	12	6	0	1408	1184	118.9	48
6	Carlton	18	11	7	0	1314	1234	106.5	44
7	Richmond	18	9	9	0	1376	1495	92.0	36
8	Fitzroy	18	6	12	0	1363	1583	86.1	24
9	St Kilda	18	6	12	0	1081	1427	75.8	24
10	Footscray	18	4	14	0	1164	1665	69.9	16
11	Hawthorn	18	3	14	1	1094	1648	66.4	14
12	North Melbourne	18	0	17	1	1102	1496	73.7	2

Rules for classification: 1. premiership points; 2. percentage; 3. points for
Average score: 74.7
Source: AFL Tables

== Finals series ==
All of the 1926 finals were played at the MCG so the home team in the semi-finals and preliminary final is purely the higher ranked team from the ladder but in the Grand Final the home team was the team that won the preliminary final.

=== Semi-finals ===
Home team	Score	Away team	Score	Venue	Crowd	Date
Geelong	10.10 (70)	Essendon	17.15 (117)	MCG	50,662	18 September
Collingwood	12.12 (84)	Melbourne	13.17 (95)	MCG	44,286	25 September

=== Preliminary final ===
Home team	Score	Away team	Score	Venue	Crowd	Date
Melbourne	6.6 (42)	Essendon	5.9 (39)	MCG	50,162	2 October

== Season notes ==
- In order to ensure that each team had nine home games in every season, the 17 game home-and-away season of 1925 was extended to 18 matches in 1926.
- Following the retirement due to ill-health of Sir Baldwin Spencer, former Melbourne footballer, club doctor, and VFL delegate Dr. William C. McClelland became President of the VFL. He served from 1926 to 1956.
- Halfway through the 1924 season, Carlton's champion Horrie Clover retired as a player due to a serious illness. He was subsequently appointed Secretary of the Carlton Club and, as well, he was made a member of the VFL's Umpire and permit Committee. By the start of 1926, Clover's health had improved to the extent that he resumed his career with Carlton, playing another 78 senior games from 1926 to 1931. Due to the perceived conflict of interest, he was made to resign from the VFL Committee.
- As the players were walking off the field for their half-time break in the preliminary final, the Melbourne centreman Bob Corbett was viciously king-hit from behind, suffering a broken jaw; Essendon's Charlie May was subsequently suspended for all of 1927 for the incident. With no replacements allowed, Melbourne were forced to continue with 17 men and were gamely defending against the Essendon onslaught in the last quarter when, with only minutes to go in the match, a barely conscious Corbett staggered out onto the field with his head swathed in bandages, and took up his position in the centre, freeing up Ivor Warne-Smith to lead the Melbourne attack. In a mark of respect for Corbett's great courage, Essendon tough-man and rugged full-back Harry Hunter, who was racing up the ground towards the Essendon goals, saw a battered Corbett standing in his way. Under normal circumstances, Hunter, who was known to take no prisoners, would have run straight through Corbett; however, in what was described as an act of great chivalry by a sportsman and a gentleman, Hunter sidestepped Corbett, and delivered the ball down the ground through another avenue. Melbourne won 6.6 (42) to Essendon's 5.9 (39). The king-hit led to strong calls for substitute replacement players.

== Awards ==
- The 1926 VFL Premiership team was Melbourne.
- The VFL's leading goalkicker was Gordon Coventry of Collingwood with 83 goals; a VFL record.
- The winner of the 1926 Brownlow Medal was Ivor Warne-Smith of Melbourne with 9 votes.
- North Melbourne took the "wooden spoon" in 1926.
- The seconds premiership was won by Carlton. Carlton 14.11 (95) defeated Geelong 5.13 (43) in the challenge Grand Final, played as a curtain raiser to the firsts Grand Final on 9 October at the Melbourne Cricket Ground.

== Sources ==
- 1926 VFL season at AFL Tables
- 1926 VFL season at Australian Football
