= Ossie Green =

Australian rules footballer, born 1906

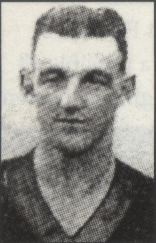

Personal information
- Full name: William Osmond Green
- Born: 11 March 1906; Koondrook, Victoria
- Died: 26 May 1991 (aged 85); Hawthorn, Victoria
- Original team: Brunswick

Playing career^{1}
Years	Club	Games (Goals)
1926, 1929, 1931	Melbourne	32 (1)
- ^{1} Playing statistics correct to the end of 1931.

William Osmond Green (11 March 1906 – 26 May 1991) was an Australian rules footballer who played with Melbourne in the Victorian Football League (VFL).
