= John Charlesworth =

John Charlesworth may refer to:

- John Charlesworth (American football) (1902–1962), American football player
- John Charlesworth (abolitionist) (1782–1864), English abolitionist and Anglican clergyman
- John Charlesworth (politician) (1815–1880), British colliery owner and Member of Parliament
- John Kaye Charlesworth (1889–1972), British geologist and academic author
