= Jim Condon (footballer) =

Australian rules footballer

Personal information
- Full name: James Joseph Condon
- Born: 15 September 1895; Carlton, Victoria
- Died: 19 December 1955 (aged 60); Coburg, Victoria
- Original team: Williamstown

Playing career^{1}
Years	Club	Games (Goals)
1915, 1918	Essendon	17 (15)
- ^{1} Playing statistics correct to the end of 1918.

James Joseph Condon (15 September 1895 – 19 December 1955) was an Australian rules footballer who played with Essendon in the Victorian Football League (VFL).
