= Albert Chadwick =

Australian rules footballer and coach

Sir Albert Chadwick
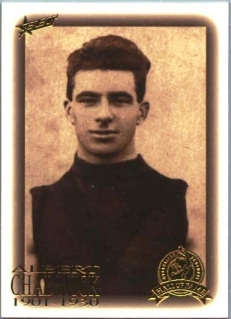

Personal information
- Full name: Sir Albert Edward Chadwick
- Born: 15 November 1897; Beechworth, Victoria
- Died: 27 October 1983 (aged 85); Toorak, Victoria
- Height: 184 cm (6 ft 0 in)
- Weight: 86 kg (190 lb)
- Position: Centre half-back

Playing career^{1}
Years	Club	Games (Goals)
1919	Prahran (VFA)	12 (8)
1920–1928	Melbourne (VFL)	141 (45)
1929	Hawthorn (VFL)	17 (8)
Total		170 (61)

Representative team honours
Years	Team	Games (Goals)
	Victoria	18 (7)

Coaching career^{3}
Years	Club	Games (W–L–D)
1925–1927	Melbourne	58 (42–15–1)
1929	Hawthorn	18 (4–14–0)
Total		76 (46–29–1)
- ^{1} Playing statistics correct to the end of 1929.^{3} Coaching statistics correct as of 1929.

Career highlights
- VFL premiership: 1926; Melbourne captain: 1924–1927; Hawthorn captain: 1929; Melbourne Team of the Century (interchange); Melbourne Hall of Fame; Runner-up in the Brownlow Medal: 1924

Sir Albert Edward Chadwick, CMG, MSM (15 November 1897 – 27 October 1983) was an Australian rules footballer in the (then) Victorian Football League (VFL).

== Early life ==
The son of Andrew Chadwick (1854-1906), and Georgina Ann Chadwick (1867-1948), née Prater, Albert Edward Chadwick was born at Beechworth, Victoria, on 15 November 1897.

He married Thelma Marea Crawley (1899-1979) in 1924. Their son, Robert Edward Chadwick (1927-1992) also played for the Melbourne First XVIII.

== Education ==
He was educated at Tungamah State Primary School (No.2225).

== Football ==
A tough centre half-back who ran hard and straight, he played the majority of his career with Melbourne Football Club, one season with the Prahran Football Club, and one season for Hawthorn Football Club.

=== Prahran (VFA) ===
Recruited by Prahran after a chance encounter with the Club's secretary, he made his debut, against North Melbourne, on 24 May 1919, and went on to play in 12 consecutive games for the Prahran First XVIII in 1919.

=== Melbourne (VFL) ===
Cleared from Prahran in 1920.

He was runner-up to Edward "Carji" Greeves in the inaugural Brownlow Medal in 1924: with one vote available per home-and-away game, and with Greeves and Chadwick both missing games when playing inter-state football for Victoria, Greeves scored seven votes (i.e., best-on-ground in seven matches) and Chadwick six.

=== Hawthorn (VFL) ===
He played for the Hawthorn First XVIII in 17 games (scoring 8 goals) in 1929.

== Military service ==
Having added a year to his age, Chadwick enlisted in the First AIF on 12 February 1916, and went on to serve overseas with the Australian Flying Corps. He was Mentioned in Dispatches in January 1919. He returned to Australia on HMAT Port Sydney in April 1919, and was awarded the Meritorious Service Medal in 1919.

During World War II, Chadwick served in the Royal Australian Air Force. He was discharged on 6 July 1945 in the rank of Wing Commander, having held the acting rank of Group Captain while serving as the RAAF's Director of Recruiting, a position which he held from 1942.

== After Football ==
Chadwick was Chairman of the Gas and Fuel Corporation of Victoria, the Melbourne Cricket Club president from 1965 to 1979, and the Melbourne Football Club president from 1950 to 1962.

Highly successful in business, he was appointed a Companion in the Order of St Michael and St George on 1 January 1967, and knighted on 1 January 1974.

== Death ==
He died at his home in Toorak, Victoria on 27 October 1983 and was cremated at Springvale Botanical Cemetery.

== Australian Football Hall of Fame ==
In 1995, Chadwick was inducted into the Australian Football Hall of Fame.

== See also ==
- 1924 Hobart Carnival
- 1927 Melbourne Carnival
