= Michael Gaudion =

Australian rules footballer (1938–2021)

Personal information
- Born: 20 June 1938
- Died: 10 August 2021 (aged 83)
- Original team: East Brighton
- Height: 174 cm (5 ft 9 in)
- Weight: 73 kg (161 lb)

Playing career^{1}
Years	Club	Games (Goals)
1957–1967	North Melbourne	152 (44)
- ^{1} Playing statistics correct to the end of 1967.

Michael Gaudion (20 June 1938 – 10 August 2021) was an Australian rules footballer who played with North Melbourne in the VFL.

Gaudion was a wingman and played his first two seasons of league football for North Melbourne under his father Charlie who was coach. He went on to appear in 152 games for the club and represented Victoria on occasions during the 1960s.
