= Frank Gaudion =

Australian rules footballer

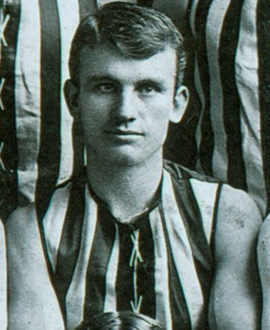
- Gaudion in 1906

Personal information
- Full name: Francis Charles Gaudion
- Born: 22 June 1882; Port Melbourne, Victoria
- Died: 12 July 1952 (aged 70); Hampton, Victoria
- Original team: Port Melbourne Rovers
- Height: 177 cm (5 ft 10 in)
- Weight: 76 kg (168 lb)

Playing career^{1}
Years	Club	Games (Goals)
1906	Collingwood	3 (1)
- ^{1} Playing statistics correct to the end of 1906.

Francis Charles Gaudion (22 June 1882 – 12 July 1952) was an Australian rules footballer who played with Collingwood in the Victorian Football League (VFL).
