= Albury Football Club =

Albury

Names
- Full name: Albury Football Club
- Nickname: Tigers
- Motto: Tradition lives here

2026 season
- Home-and-away season: 8th (5 wins/13 losses)

Club details
- Founded: 1876; 150 years ago
- Colours
- Competition: Ovens & Murray Football League
- President: Stuart Hodgson
- Coach: Luke Daly, Anthony Miles
- Premierships: (22): 1902, 1908, 1913, 1928, 1937, 1939, 1940, 1947, 1956, 1966, 1982, 1985, 1995, 1996, 1997, 2009, 2010, 2011, 2014, 2015, 2016, 2018.
- Ground: Albury Sports Ground (capacity: 7,000)

Uniforms
Away

Other information
- Official website: alburytigers.com.au

The Albury Football Club, nicknamed the Tigers, is an Australian rules football and netball club based in Albury, a major regional city in New South Wales. Albury football and netball squads compete in the Ovens & Murray Football League.

== Club history ==
On Saturday night, 3 June 1876, upwards of twenty gentlemen of the town of Albury assembled at Day's Commercial Chambers for the purpose of establishing a football club. The chair was occupied by Mr. M P Ryan. It was resolved on the proposal of Mr. John Day 'That a football club be established to be designated the Albury Football Club.' The following gentlemen were office bearers for the ensuing year – President – Mr. John Day, Treasurer and Secretary – Mr. Phillips. The committee agreed to adopt the Victorian rules of football.

It appears from newspaper reports that the first match that Albury played was against the Beechworth Football Club on the Beechworth Cricket Ground, on Saturday, 8 July 1876, with Dr. Duncan captaining the Albury side.

There appears to be no newspaper records of the Albury Football Club in 1877.

On Saturday, 11 May 1878, a meeting was held at the Albury Hotel "to resuscitate the defunct football club....and that records of the original club were not extant". Dr. J C Duncan was elected president, John Wilkinson, Secretary and A Dawson, Treasurer.

In April 1895 at an Ovens and Murray Football Association meeting, it was decided to let both Albury and Border United Football Club (Corowa based) join the O&MFA.

In 1897 Albury had their team photo taken and can be viewed via this link.

In 1910, the O&MFA had only three teams – Albury, Excelsior and Rutherglen with Rutherglen winning the premiership.

Then in 1911, both Excelsior and Rutherglen applied to enter the Rutherglen and District Football Association. As a result, the O&MFA folded, with local teams attempting to apply to play in the Rutherglen & DFA. A ballot took place at a Rutherglen & DFA meeting on 29 April at Mackay's Hotel, Rutherglen which resulted in Balldale, North Albury, Rutherglen, South Albury and Wodonga being refused admission to join the association. Corowa, Excelsior and Lake Rovers were clubs that were admitted. In 1911, the Albury Football Club was planning to divide the club into South Albury and North Albury teams, but as they were not admitted into the Rutherglen & DFA, the club went into recess in 1911.

Albury FC and Rutherglen FC were admitted into the Rutherglen & DFA in 1912.

After a three-year break due to World War I, the O&MFA reformed for the 1919 season with only four clubs, Border United Football Club (Corowa based), Howlong, Lake Rovers and Rutherglen. Albury Football Club was reformed in early 1919 and played in the Albury Senior Football Association with two teams – South Albury and North Albury, with St. Patrick's FC defeating South Albury Football Club in the grand final on the Albury Sportsground.

In 1920 the O&MFA did not reform; "It seems strange that the O&MFA has apparently been allowed to die a natural death" with only two club's present at the O&MFA – AGM, with some clubs moving to play in the Chiltern & DFA and Coreen & DFA.

In 1920, Albury lost the Albury Senior Football Association semi final to Diggers.

In March, 1924, Albury FC and the Diggers FC decided to amalgamate and apply for admission into the Ovens and Murray Football League as Albury Football Club.

In 1927, Albury appointed former West Adelaide Football Club captain/coach and 1922 Magarey Medallist, Robert "Bobby" Barnes as coach.

On 5 March 1929 at an O&MFL meeting, most club's were very much opposed to the professionalism and paying of players payments to Albury, Hume Weir and St. Patrick's FC footballers, in which the financial resources required were out of reach for the existing clubs - Beechworth, Corowa, Rutherglen and Wangaratta. These clubs were also opposed to the pooling of gate takings too. These clubs demanded that the Albury clubs must have certain restrictions imposed on them so the other clubs could be competitive, basically to restrict the number of imported and paid players and coaches by imposing strict residential qualifications.

On 17 March 1929 at an O&M meeting it was proposed that three Albury club's be formed on a territorial / residential basis, which meant that both the Albury and St. Patrick's football decided to disband and form a local Albury competition, but both clubs later decided to form both East and West Albury football club's based on strict residential boundaries and apply for admission to the O&MFL.

Both Albury and St. Patrick's did not disband due to religious tension or because of sectarian lines as reported at Ovens and Murray Football League, (although there was apparently a significant amount of religious tension between St. Patrick's and Albury, but no actual documented proof) but due to pressure and new rules placed on them by other O&MFL club's to weaken their strength and to halt player payments by these two Albury teams. These are actual documented facts as per the references/citations in the above two paragraphs.

East Albury Football Club and Weir United Football Club merged in 1933 to become the Border United Football Club (Albury based) and wore green and white jumpers. In 1933 West Albury Football Club changed its name to the Albury Football Club and remained in the West Albury colours of maroon and blue.

At the 1934 O&MFL Annual General Meeting, the Albury FC requested to change it football jumpers to black and yellow, which was granted.

Triple Brownlow Medallist and triple Sandover Medallist, Haydn Bunton senior played with the Albury Rovers Football Club in 1926 and 1927, then Albury Football Club in 1928 and 1929 and then with West Albury Football Club in 1930 and 1931. The 1936 Brownlow Medallist, Denis Ryan actually played with the Albury Rovers Football Club, in the Albury & District Football League prior to joining Fitzroy Football Club in 1935.

In 1936, Border United Football Club (Albury based) would merge with the Albury FC when both clubs were short of players and both in debt and took on the name of Albury Football Club!

Between 1927 and 1935, Albury Football Club and its affiliated club's participated in nine consecutive O&MFL grand finals: 1927 and 1928 – Albury; 1929, 1930, 1931 and 1932 – West Albury; 1933, 1934 and 1935 – Border United. Albury FC then played in the 1937, 1939 and 1940 grand finals. Then immediately after the World War II recess, Albury played in the 1946, 1947 and 1948 grand finals, thus playing in 15 out of 17 grand finals, missing out in 1936 and 1938.

In July 1953, the Memorial Scoreboard at the Albury Sports Ground was officially opened to perpetuate, the memory of Albury sportsmen who died in World War One and World War Two.

In 1972, Albury seniors did not win a game and finished on the bottom of the ladder.

This club history is a continual work in progress.

== Football leagues ==
Albury have played in the following football competitions -

- Ovens & Murray Football League
  - 1895 to 1902
- Albury FC in recess
  - 1903 to 1906
- Ovens & Murray Football League
  - 1907 to 1910
- Albury FC in recess (In 1911, both Albury & Rutherglen were not admitted into the Rutherglen & DFA due to their previous strength)
  - 1911
- Rutherglen & District Football Association
  - 1912 & 1913
- Ovens & Murray Football League
  - 1914 & 1915
- World War I (O&MFL and Albury FC in recess)
  - 1916 to 1918
- Albury Senior Football Association
  - 1919
- Albury & Border Football Association
  - 1920 to 1923
- Ovens & Murray Football League
  - 1924 to 1928 (In 1924 Albury FC & Diggers FC decide to merge, both from the Albury & Border FA & enter the O&MFA as Albury FC)
- Ovens & Murray Football League
  - 1929 to 1932 (In 1929, both Albury & St. Patrick's FC's disband and two teams entered as East Albury & West Albury FC's)
- Ovens & Murray Football League
  - 1933 to 1935 (In 1933 East Albury merged with Weir United & became Border United FC. West Albury changed its name to Albury FC in 1933)
- Ovens & Murray Football League
  - 1936 to 1940 (In 1936 Border United merged with Albury and took on the name Albury FC)
- World War II
  - 1941 to 1945 (Albury and the O&MFL in recess)
- Ovens & Murray Football League
  - 1946 to 2020 (Albury FC)

== Football premierships ==
Seniors

Albury Football Club

- Ovens & Murray Football League (22):
- 1902
- 1908
- 1913
- 1928
- 1937, 1939
- 1940, 1947
- 1956
- 1966
- 1982, 1985
- 1995, 1996, 1997
- 2009
- 2010, 2011, 2014, 2015, 2016, 2018

West Albury Football Club

- 1929

Border United Football Club (Albury based)

- 1934

== Football – runners up ==
Seniors

Albury Football Club

- Ovens and Murray Football League (17)
  - 1899, 1901, 1907, 1909, 1910, 1912, 1927, 1946, 1948, 1953, 1957, 1981, 1983, 1999, 2012, 2013, 2017

East Albury Football Club

- 1929

West Albury Football Club

- 1930, 1931, 1932

Border United Football Club (Albury based)

- 1933, 1935

Albury Senior Football Association

- 1919 (South Albury)

Albury & Border Football Association

- 1921, 1922

== Morris Medal winners ==
- 1935. Noel Barnett
- 1956. Lance Mann
- 1963. Ken Bennett
- 1965. Joe Ambrose
- 1981. Rod Coelli
- 1982. Peter Gorski
- 1993. Tim Scott
- 1994. Tim Scott
- 1995. Ken Howe
- 1996. Leigh Newton
- 2011. Shaun Daly
- 2012. Joel Mackie
- 2015. Joel Mackie
- 2017. Chris Hyde

== Albury Football Club players who played in the VFL / AFL ==
The following 68 footballers played with Albury and / or (East Albury, West Albury & Border United in the 1930s) prior to playing senior football in the VFL/AFL, with the year indicating their VFL/AFL debut or draft year.

- 1898 – Conrad ten Brink – Essendon
- 1904 - Peter McCann - South Melbourne
- 1904 - Arthur Percy - South Melbourne
- 1904 – Bill Strang – South Melbourne
- 1904 – Syd Wright – South Melbourne
- 1905 - Frank Dunne - St. Kilda
- 1910 - Les Frauenfelder - Richmond
- 1913 – Dick Fitzgerald – South Melbourne
- 1914 – Paddy Abbott – South Melbourne, Fitzroy, Richmond
- 1925 - Hope Evans - Carlton
- 1928 - Ray Usher - Melbourne
- 1930 - Frank Beggs - Fitzroy
- 1930 - Alex Clarke: North Melbourne
- 1931 – Haydn Bunton – Fitzroy
- 1931 – Doug Strang – Richmond
- 1931 – Gordon Strang – Richmond
- 1932 - Charlie Kolb - Richmond
- 1932 - Laurie Plunkett - Fitzroy
- 1933 – Bert Clarke – North Melbourne
- 1933 - Noel Barnett - Melbourne
- 1933 – Colin Strang – St. Kilda
- 1936 - Peter Chitty - St. Kilda
- 1939 - Frederick William Terrence "Tom" Davey - Hawthorn
- 1939 - Don Seymour - Footscray
- 1940 – Norm Betson – Essendon
- 1941 – Les Main – Collingwood
- 1942 – Jim Matthews – St. Kilda
- 1944 – Leslie Gregory – Carlton
- 1944 – Bill Wood – Footscray
- 1946 - Jack Eames - Richmond
- 1947 – Allan Strang – South Melbourne
- 1951 – Lance Mann – Essendon
- 1951 – Loy Stewart – Geelong
- 1954 – Keith Thomas – South Melbourne
- 1955 - Colin Barton - Geelong
- 1955 – Barry Takle – Hawthorn
- 1959 – Dick Grimmond – Richmond
- 1961 – Ray Thomas – Collingwood
- 1962 - Neville Forge - South Melbourne
- 1962 – Bill Lieschke – Essendon
- 1965 – Geoff Strang – Richmond
- 1965 – Bruce Waite – Essendon
- 1967 - Wennie Van Lint - South Melbourne
- 1968 - Bernie Brady - Collingwood
- 1969 – John Duthie – North Melbourne
- 1971 – Phil Baker – North Melbourne
- 1974 – Peter Taylor – North Melbourne
- 1976 – Gary Gray – North Melbourne
- 1976 - Don Mattson - Richmond & Essendon
- 1981 – Dennis Carroll – South Melbourne
- 1984 – Tony Hughes – Sydney Swans
- 1985 – Paul Spargo – North Melbourne & Brisbane Bears
- 1986 - Donald Thompson - Sydney Swans
- 1991 – Ben Doolan – Sydney Swans
- 1995 – Tim Scott – Sydney Swans
- 1997 – Leigh Newton – Melbourne
- 2001 - Justin Koschitzke - St. Kilda
- 2002 – Daniel Cross – Footscray & Melbourne
- 2013 - Zac Williams - Greater Western Sydney
- 2015 - Dougal Howard - Port Adelaide
- 2015 - Nicholas Coughlan - St. Kilda
- 2016 - Lachie Tiziani - Greater Western Sydney
- 2017 - Max Lynch - Collingwood
- 2017 - Will Setterfield - Greater Western Sydney & Carlton
- 2018 – Charlie Spargo – Melbourne
- 2018 - Mathew Walker - Hawthorn
- 2019 – Zach Sproule – Greater Western Sydney
- 2025 - Riley Bice Sydney Swans
