= Strang (surname) =

Strang is a surname. Notable people with the surname include:

== Arts and entertainment ==
- Gerald Strang (1908–1983), American composer
- John Strang (writer) (1795–1863), Scottish writer
- Ray C. Strang, American illustrator
- William Strang (1859–1921), Scottish artist

== Politics ==
- Gavin Strang (born 1943), Scottish politician
- Michael L. Strang, American politician

== Religion ==
- Evelyn Strang (1867–1954), President, Australian Woman's Christian Temperance Union
- James Strang (1813–1856), American Mormon leader
- John Strang (1584–1654), Scottish church minister

== Sport ==
=== Australian rules football ===
- Archie Strang (Australian footballer) (1887–1962), Australian footballer
- Bill Strang (footballer) (1883–1937), Australian rules footballer
- Charlie Strang (1916–1992), Australian footballer
- Colin Strang (footballer) (1910–1946), Australian rules footballer
- Doug Strang (1912–1954), Australian rules footballer
- Geoff Strang (1944–2003), Australian rules footballer
- Gordon Strang (1909–1951), Australian rules footballer

=== Cricket ===
- Paul Strang (born 1970), Zimbabwean cricketer
- Robert Strang (cricketer) (1901–1976), English cricketer
- Walter Strang (1888–1944), New Zealand cricketer and businessman

=== Other sports ===
- Archie Strang (rugby union) (1906–1989), New Zealand rugby union player
- Sammy Strang (1876–1932), American baseball player
- William Strang (footballer) (1878–1916), Scottish footballer

== Other fields ==
- Barbara Strang (1925–1982), English language scholar
- Gilbert Strang (born 1934), mathematician
- Robert Strang (physician), Canadian physician
- William Strang, 1st Baron Strang, (1893–1978), British diplomat
- William B. Strang Jr. (1857–1921), American railroad magnate
