= Alick =

Alick is both a masculine given name and a surname. Notable people with the name include:

== Given name ==
- Alick Aluwihare (1926–2009), Sri Lankan politician
- Alick Athanaze, Dominican cricketer
- Alick Bannerman (1854–1924), Australian cricketer
- Alick Bevan (1915–1945), British cyclist
- Alick Black (1909–1988), Australian rules footballer
- Alick Bryant (1903–1985), Australian soldier
- Alick Buchanan-Smith, Baron Balerno (1898–1984), British soldier and politician
- Alick Buchanan-Smith (politician) (1932–1991), British politician
- Alick Davison (1886–1945), Australian rules footballer
- Alick Downer (1910–1981), Australian politician and diplomat
- Alick Foord-Kelcey (1913–1973), British Royal Air Force officer
- Alick Glennie (1925–2003), British computer scientist
- Alick Grant (1916–2008), English footballer
- Alick Handford (1869–1935), English cricketer
- Alick Horsnell (1881–1916), English architect
- Alick Isaacs (1921–1967), Scottish virologist
- Alick Jeffrey (1939–2000), English footballer
- Alick Kay (1884–1961), Australian politician
- Alick Lill (1904–1987), Australian rules footballer
- Alick Macheso (born 1968), Zimbabwean musician
- Alick Mackenzie (1870–1947), Australian cricketer
- Alick Maclean (1872–1936), English composer and conductor
- Alick Maemae (born 1985), Solomon Islands footballer
- Alick McCallum (1877–1937), Australian politician
- Alick J. Murray (c. 1850–1929), Australian pastoralist
- Alick Nkhata (1922–1978), Zambian musician
- Alick Ogilvie (1887–1915), Australian rules footballer
- Alick Osborne, Australian politician
- Alick Lindsay Poole (1908–2008), New Zealand botanist and forester
- Alick Robinson (1906–1977), English footballer
- Alick Rowe (1939–2009), British writer
- Alick Stevens (1898–1987), British Royal Air Force officer
- Alick Tipoti (born 1975), Indigenous Australian (Torres Strait Islander) artist and activist
- Alick Walker (1925–1999), British palaeontologist
- Alick Wyers (1907–1980), English cricketer
