= Strang =

Strang may refer to:

== People ==
- Strang (surname)

== Places ==
- Strang, Oklahoma
- Strang, Nebraska
- Strang, Isle of Man
- Baron Strang, UK peerage
