= Colin Strang =

Colin Strang may refer to:

- Colin Strang (politician), Canadian politician
- Colin Strang (footballer) (1910–1946), Australian rules footballer
- Colin Strang, 2nd Baron Strang (1922–2014), British philosopher
