= Frauenfelder =

Frauenfelder is a surname of Swiss origin. Notable people with the surname include:

- Hans Frauenfelder (1922–2022), Swiss-born American physicist
- Les Frauenfelder (1888–1955), Australian rules footballer
- Mark Frauenfelder (born 1960), American blogger, illustrator, and journalist
