= Stormont Estate =

Estate in County Down, Northern Ireland

Coordinates: 54°35′58″N 5°50′12″W

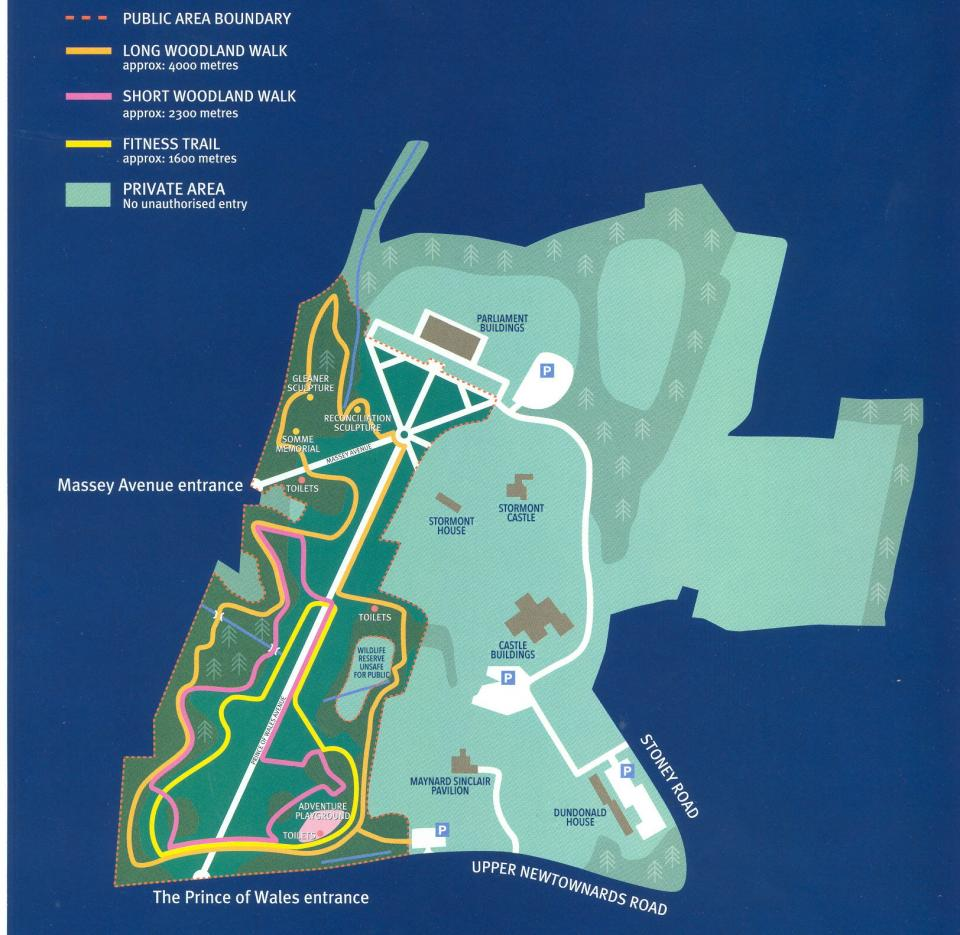
Map of the Stormont Estate showing the location of prominent buildings

The Stormont Estate is an estate in the east of Belfast in Northern Ireland. It is the site of Northern Ireland's main Parliament Buildings, which is surrounded by woods and parkland, and is often referred to in contemporary media as the metonym "Stormont".

The Stormont Estate is within the townland of Ballymiscaw.

== The Cleland family ==
The Stormont Estate was established by the Reverend John Cleland (1755–1834) in the early nineteenth century. He built Stormont Castle in 1830 which was described as a "large plain house with very little planting about it". In 1858 the exterior of the castle was redesigned in the Scottish Baronial style by the local architect Thomas Turner. Some ancillary buildings were added at this time including a lean-to glasshouse and stables. A terraced garden and a walled kitchen garden were also created. When Cleland died in 1834 the estate went to John Cleland (1836–1893) and then finally to Arthur Charles Stewart Cleland (1865–1924).

The origin of the name "Stormont" is unclear. It may be a shortened version of "Storm Mount" (recorded as the name of the estate in 1834), or it may have been taken from the name of a district of Perthshire. The Perthshire name is Gaelic in origin, and is believed to mean "place for crossing the mountain" (from star monadh). There is also a Stormont in County Limerick, and Stormounts in counties Armagh and Down.

The Cleland family moved out in 1893 to live abroad and the estate was let to a tenant. When the tenancy ended, initial efforts to sell the estate failed.

== Government ownership ==
In 1921, the newly formed Parliament of Northern Ireland was looking for a site for its Parliament Buildings. Parliament authorised the Government of Northern Ireland to purchase the 224-acre Stormont Estate for about £21,000; this included 100 acres of woodland. Stormont Castle became the headquarters of the Government of Northern Ireland. Stormont Castle also became the official residence of the Prime Minister of Northern Ireland.

Ralph Knott designed Stormont House in a Neo-Georgian style. The house was completed in 1926, and a two-storey administration block to its east was finished by 1939. A flat-roofed single-storey extension was added in about 1975. It was listed as a historic building in 1987.

Parliament Buildings at Stormont were designed by Sir Arnold Thornely in Greek classical style. They were opened by Edward, Prince of Wales, later King Edward VIII, in 1932.

The main approach to Parliament Buildings is along Prince of Wales Avenue. On this road stands a bronze statue of the barrister and Unionist politician, Lord Carson, on a stone plinth and base. This was erected in 1933 and designed by the sculptor Leonard Stanford Merrifield.

Detached two-storey stone lodges and gate screens to Stormont Estate were built about 1932, on the Upper Newtownards Road and on Massey Avenue. They were designed by Sir Arnold Thornely. Both were listed as historic structures in 1987.

A single-storey hipped roof Neo-Georgian style pavilion located on the north side of Massey Avenue, just inside the entrance, was built in 1936 by the Ministry of Finance. It was designed by Sir Arnold Thornley. Another single-storey hipped roof Neo-Georgian style pavilion on Massey Avenue was built to the east side of the Lord Carson Memorial at some point between 1938 and 1959. The architect is not known.

Dundonald House was designed in the early 1960s by Belfast-born architect Robert Hanna Gibson. It is in the international style.

The tomb of Viscount Craigavon, the first Prime Minister of Northern Ireland, and his wife, Cecil, is on the east side of Parliament Buildings. It is a solid block of Portland limestone with stepped top and corners on a shallow plinth base, set on a stepped platform. The tomb was designed by Roland Ingleby Smit and was completed in 1942.

== Buildings ==
| Building | Image | About |
|---|---|---|
| Castle Buildings | | Headquarters of the Department of Health and the Department of Justice. The complex is notable for its use as the location of the negotiations surrounding the Good Friday Agreement. |
| Craigantlet Buildings | | Offices used by the Department of Finance. |
| Dundonald House | | Previously headquarters of the Northern Ireland Civil Service, Department of Agriculture, Environment and Rural Affairs and Northern Ireland Prison Service. |
| Maynard Sinclair Pavilion | | Home to the Northern Ireland Civil Service Sports and Social Club. |
| Parliament Buildings | | Seat of the Northern Ireland Assembly. Usually referred to as Stormont. |
| Stormont Castle | | Seat of the Northern Ireland Executive and headquarters of The Executive Office. Previously official residence of the Prime Minister of Northern Ireland. |
| Stormont House | | Previously official residence of the Speaker of the House of Commons of Northern Ireland and headquarters of the Northern Ireland Office. Also known as Speaker's House. |

== Public access ==
The Stormont Estate grounds are open to the public. Facilities include a boardwalk, a fitness trail, an outdoor gym and a barbecue area. There is also a children's park named after former Secretary of State for Northern Ireland, Mo Mowlam, MP.

Stormont Estate is now home to the Stormont Parkrun, a free, weekly, 5 kilometres (3.1 mi) timed run.

== Stormont regulations ==
The regulations governing the use of the Stormont Estate are displayed at its entrance. These were initially enacted on 31 October 1933, in an order by the Ministry of Finance. These were eventually amended and the regulations currently in force are:

- The Stormont Estate Regulations, 1933
- The Stormont Estate Amendment Regulations (Northern Ireland), 1951
- The Stormont Estate Amendment Regulations (Northern Ireland), 1958
