= Horsnell =

Horsnell is a surname. Notable people with the surname include:

- Alick Horsnell (1882–1916), English architect, draughtsman, and artist
- Brett Horsnell (born 1970), Australian rugby league footballer
- Kenneth Horsnell (born 1933), Australian cricketer
- Melanie Horsnell, Australian singer-songwriter
