= Slowpoke (disambiguation) =

Slowpoke is a fictional species in the Pokémon universe.

Slowpoke or Slow Poke may also refer to:

== Media titles ==
- Slow Poke (film), a 1933 Skibo Productions film starring Stepin Fetchit
- Slowpoke (comic strip), weekly comic strip by Jen Sorensen
- "Story One: Slow Pokes", a chapter of the 2017 episode "Facebook Fish Planner Backstage" of the U.S. TV sitcom Life in Pieces; see List of Life in Pieces episodes
- "Slow Poke", a painting by Ray C. Strang

=== Songs ===
- "Slow Poke", a 1951 American country music hit song
- "Slow Poke", a 1975 song by 'April Wine' off the album Stand Back (April Wine album)
- "Slow Poke", a 1978 song by 'Jackie McLean' of the album Hipnosis ('Jackie McLean' album)
- "Slowpoke", a song by Crosby, Stills, Nash & Young

== People and characters ==
- A person afflicted with tardiness
- A person afflicted with lethargy
- A person with a lack of speed
- Mark "Slow Poke" Mangano, a member of the Hells Angels outlaw motorcycle club; see Hells Angels MC criminal allegations and incidents in the United States

=== Fictional characters ===
- Slow Poke (Transformers), a fictional robot character
- Slowpoke Rodriguez, a fictional rodent, a character in Looney Tunes
- Keun "Slow Poke" Sup, aka 'The Blur'; a fictional character from Craig of the Creek; see List of Craig of the Creek characters

== Other uses ==
- SLOWPOKE reactor (Safe LOW-POwer Kritical Experiment), a design of pool-type nuclear research reactor
- Slowpoke or Athetis tarda, a moth in the family Noctuidae
- SLoWPoKES (Sloan Low-mass Wide Pairs of Kinematically Equivalent Stars), star catalogue of binary pairs created by the Sloan Digital Sky Survey

== See also ==
- Slow (disambiguation)
- Poke (disambiguation)
- "Slow Poke Music" (song), a 1980 song by 'Whitesnake' off the single "Fool for Your Loving"
