= Paddy Abbott =

Australian rules footballer

Personal information
- Full name: Patrick Kenneth Abbott
- Born: 2 February 1889; Albury, New South Wales
- Died: 21 January 1973 (aged 83); Glen Waverley, Victoria
- Original team: Albury
- Position: Fullback

Playing career^{1}
Years	Club	Games (Goals)
1913	South Melbourne	4 (0)
1914–18	Fitzroy	40 (1)
1919–20	Richmond	18 (1)
Total		62 (2)
- ^{1} Playing statistics correct to the end of 1920.

Patrick Kenneth Abbott (2 February 1889 – 21 January 1973) was an Australian rules footballer of the 1910s who played with South Melbourne, Fitzroy, and Richmond in the Victorian Football League (VFL).

== Sources ==
- Holmesby, Russell & Main, Jim (2007). The Encyclopedia of AFL Footballers, 7th ed. Melbourne: Bas Publishing, ISBN 9781920910785
