= Leigh Newton =

Australian rules footballer (born 1976)

Personal information
- Full name: Leigh Newton
- Nickname: Juice
- Born: 25 March 1976 (age 50)
- Original team: King Valley / Albury / Murray Bushrangers
- Draft: 3rd overall, 1997 Pre-season draft (Melbourne)
- Height: 198 cm (6 ft 6 in)
- Weight: 103 kg (227 lb)
- Position: Ruck

Playing career^{1}
Years	Club	Games (Goals)
1997–1999	Melbourne	13 (6)
- ^{1} Playing statistics correct to the end of 1997.

Leigh Newton (born 25 March 1976) is a former Australian rules footballer who played for the Melbourne Football Club in the Australian Football League (AFL). A ruckman, Newton played 13 matches for Melbourne in his first season at the club, 1997. He was struck down by injuries the next two seasons, which resulted in him not playing a senior match. Melbourne delisted Newton at the end of 1999. Despite this, Newton remained with the club for many years, working as a ruck coach and media manager, before moving to become Hawthorn's ruck coach in 2009.

== Early life ==
Newton is originally from Whitfield, a small town of around 200 people, located near Wangaratta in north-eastern Victoria. He began playing football for King Valley United Football Club, located near his hometown of Whitfield, in the Ovens & King Football League; he first played senior football at the age of 15. Later he moved to play for the larger Albury Football Club in the Ovens & Murray Football League, before being selected to play for the Murray Bushrangers in the TAC Cup. Newton played for Albury and for the Bushrangers in 1996, earning the attention of AFL recruiters by winning the award for the best and fairest player in the Ovens & Murray Football League, the Morris Medal. Despite not being selected in the 1996 AFL draft, Newton was invited to do a pre-season with Melbourne in the hope of being selected in the pre-season draft. He had an impressive pre-season; his track work was described as "stunning", he put on a lot of muscle and he played well in intra-club practice matches. As a result, Melbourne selected Newton with their first selection (third overall) in the pre-season draft, to be a back-up for Brownlow Medal winner, Jim Stynes.

== AFL career ==
One week after being drafted, Newton played in Melbourne's only 1997 Ansett Australia Cup match, a loss to Carlton. Having been dubbed Melbourne's "key signing" of the off-season, the expectation at the start of the season was that Newton would "play at some stage". Newton made his AFL debut in round 3 against Sydney, kicking a goal with his first kick. He remained in the side for the next two matches before being dropped for round 6. Newton was back in the team the following week against Fremantle and his performance was described as "encourag[ing]". Two weeks later, Newton kicked two of Melbourne's three goals in a big loss to Port Adelaide. In round 10, after playing in five consecutive losses to begin his career, Newton played in his first AFL victory in a match where he was occasionally a tall target in Melbourne's forward line. At the halfway mark of the season, Newton's "encouraging" form was described as one of the few good points of the Demons' disappointing season. Newton missed the next three games after his first win, but was recalled to the side in round 14 and remained in it until round 20, kicking three goals in the seven matches. He was injured in the round 20 game against West Coast and subsequently missed the rest of the season.

After a promising first season in which he played 13 games, Newton was expected to improve in 1998 and become a regular in the side. However, he was sidelined by a groin strain early in the season, which recurred regularly throughout 1998. Newton was only able to return to the reserves in mid-July. His groin injury then flared up again and, by August, it became so bad that he was required to miss the rest of the season. After his horror 1998 season, Newton had a much better pre-season for 1999. He played in a practice match against Fremantle and was considered to be on track to play in round 1. Midway through April, Newton played his first full game in the reserves, kicking four goals in the process, only for a hernia operation to sideline him for a month. He returned to the reserves in June, but then suffered a shoulder injury that ruled him out for the rest of the season. After two injury-riddled seasons where he was unable to make a senior appearance, Newton was delisted by the Demons at the end of 1999. He nominated for the pre-season draft, but went undrafted and so retired from football.

== Post-AFL career ==
In 2003, Newton was appointed Melbourne's media manager, a role he filled for six seasons. In conjunction with his media responsibilities, Newton also became the Demons' ruck coach in 2008. Newton left the Demons at the end of 2008, becoming the ruck coach at Hawthorn and public relations and marketing executive at the Moonee Valley Racing Club.

== Personal life ==
Newton's three brothers, Michael, (Note: Not to be confused with former Melbourne player Michael Newton.) Cohan and Brent, were all accomplished country football players in the Ovens & King Football League and Ovens & Murray Football League. Newton's father, Laurie, played football for Wangaratta Football Club in the Ovens & Murray Football League.

== Footnotes ==
Notes
