= Dick Grimmond =

Australian rules footballer and coach (1938–2024)

Personal information
- Full name: Richard James Grimmond
- Born: 6 July 1938
- Died: 24 October 2024 (aged 86)
- Original team: Albury
- Height: 179 cm (5 ft 10 in)
- Weight: 73 kg (161 lb)
- Position: Wingman

Playing career^{1}
Years	Club	Games (Goals)
1959–1964	Richmond	102 (6)
- ^{1} Playing statistics correct to the end of 1964.

Richard James Grimmond (6 July 1938 – 24 October 2024) was an Australian rules footballer who played for Richmond in the Victorian Football League (VFL).

From his debut in the fifth round of the 1959 VFL season until midway through the 1964 season, Grimmond did not miss a single game for Richmond.

Grimmond usually played as a wingman and after being appointed captain-coach of North Hobart in 1965, promptly steered the club to a Grand Final loss. He represented Tasmania in the 1966 Hobart Carnival.

Originally from Albury, he played for both Albury and Wodonga Football Clubs.

Grimmond died on 24 October 2024, at the age of 86.
