= Noel Barnett =

Australian rules footballer

Personal information
- Full name: Noel Leon Barnett
- Born: 22 November 1908; Holbrook, New South Wales
- Died: 21 July 2000 (aged 91); Albury, New South Wales
- Original teams: Albury Rovers, St. Patrick's (O&MFL), West Albury

Playing career^{1}
Years	Club	Games (Goals)
1933	Melbourne	11 (2)
- ^{1} Playing statistics correct to the end of 1933.

Noel Leon Barnett (22 November 1908 – 21 July 2000) was an Australian rules footballer who played with Melbourne in the Victorian Football League (VFL).

Barnett made 11 appearances for Melbourne in the 1933 VFL season, after arriving from West Albury Football Club.

While he was in Melbourne in 1933, West Albury changed its name to the Albury Football Club and Barnett returned to play with the Albury and took over from Cleaver Bunton as captain-coach for the final few games in 1934.

Barnett won the Ovens & Murray Football League's best and fairest award, the Morris Medal in 1935.
