= John Perry (footballer) =

Australian rules footballer

Personal information
- Full name: John Douglas Perry
- Born: 13 March 1945 (age 81); Albury, New South Wales
- Original team: Wodonga (OMFL)
- Height: 183 cm (6 ft 0 in)
- Weight: 76 kg (168 lb)

Playing career^{1}
Years	Club	Games (Goals)
1964–1969	Richmond	26 (1)
1970–1974	North Melbourne	57 (26)
Total		83 (27)
- ^{1} Playing statistics correct to the end of 1974.

Career highlights
- Richmond Premiership Player 1967; Richmond Reserves Premiership Player 1966; Richmond Reserves Equal Best & Fairest 1969

John Douglas Perry (born 13 March 1945) is a former Australian rules football player who played in the VFL between 1964 and 1969 for the Richmond Football Club and from 1970 until 1974 for the North Melbourne Football Club.

== Family ==
The son of John Perry, and Edna "Bob" Perry, née Strang, the daughter of Doug Strang, John Douglas Perry was born at Albury, New South Wales on 13 March 1945.

He was the grandson of William James "Bill" Strang (1883–1937), the nephew of Gordon "Cocker" Strang (1908–1951), Henry Colin Strang (1910–1946), Francis Douglas "Doug" Strang (1912–1954), and Allan Strang (1921–1996), and the cousin of Doug's son, Geoff Strang (1944–2003).
