= Stormont House =

Building in Belfast, Northern Ireland

- Speaker's House
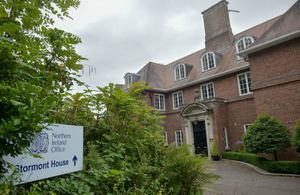
- Interactive map of Stormont House
- 54.601779°N 5.832303°W

Listed Building – Grade B1
- Official name: Stormont House
- Designated: 13 March 1987
- Reference no.: HB26/13/017

Stormont House (also called Speaker's House) is a Grade B1 listed building situated in the Stormont Estate in Belfast, Northern Ireland. It was designed by Ralph Knott, although Sir Edwin Lutyens has been credited with some involvement.

It served as the official residence of the Speaker of the House of Commons of Northern Ireland between 1926 and 1972. For part of the time it was actually lived in by a number of Prime Ministers of Northern Ireland in preference to their own official residence, Stormont Castle, which was used primarily as offices. It was later the headquarters of the Northern Ireland Office (NIO) until 2022, when the NIO moved to Erskine House in central Belfast.

Stormont House shares its grounds with Castle Buildings, however it is separated from the main building by a fence.

== See also ==
- Northern Ireland Office
- Hillsborough Castle
