= Neville Forge =

Australian rules footballer

Personal information
- Full name: Neville Forge
- Born: 10 April 1940
- Died: 23 December 2023 (Aged 82); Wangaratta
- Original teams: Walla Walla, Albury
- Height: 187 cm (6 ft 2 in)
- Weight: 92 kg (203 lb)

Playing career^{1}
Years	Club	Games (Goals)
1962	South Melbourne	2 (0)
- ^{1} Playing statistics correct to the end of 1962.

Neville Forge (born 10 April 1940, died 23 December 2023) was a former Australian rules footballer who played with South Melbourne in the Victorian Football League (VFL).

Forge was recruited to South Melbourne from Albury in the Ovens and Murray Football League on the recommendation of former South Melbourne player, Fred Goldsmith who was coaching Albury at the time.
