= Tony Hughes (footballer) =

Australian rules footballer

Personal information
- Full name: Anthony Hughes
- Born: 12 March 1963 (age 63)
- Original team: Albury
- Height: 183 cm (6 ft 0 in)
- Weight: 83 kg (183 lb)

Playing career^{1}
Years	Club	Games (Goals)
1984–1985	Sydney Swans	6 (2)
- ^{1} Playing statistics correct to the end of 1985.

Tony Hughes (born 12 March 1963) is a former Australian rules footballer who played with the Sydney Swans in the Victorian Football League (VFL).

== Career ==
Hughes, recruited to Sydney from Albury, kicked two goals on his debut, against Essendon in the 11th round of the 1984 VFL season. He played again the following week against Melbourne, a 97-point loss, then lost his spot in the team and didn't make any more appearances that season.

In 1985 he played four games for Sydney, from rounds 12 to 15. This included a 22 disposal game when Sydney defeated Richmond at the SCG, for which he received a Brownlow Medal vote. Coach John Northey singled out Hughes's effort playing on Maurice Rioli as the highlight of the win.
