= Bill Wood (Australian footballer) =

Australian rules footballer

Personal information
- Born: 9 November 1921
- Died: 11 September 1989 (aged 67)
- Original team: Albury (OMFL)
- Debut: Round 3, 1944, Footscray vs. Collingwood
- Height: 183 cm (6 ft 0 in)
- Weight: 86 kg (190 lb)

Playing career^{1}
| Years | Club | Games (Goals) |
| 1944–1951 | Footscray | 115 (294) |
- ^{1} Playing statistics correct to the end of 1951.

Bill Wood (9 November 1921 – 11 September 1989) was an Australian rules footballer who played with Footscray in the VFL.

== Career ==
Prior to joining Footscray, he played with South Sydney, where he was renowned for his goalkicking, managing 28 goals in a match against Sydney Naval in 1943. Footscray's Harry Hickey, with whom Wood served in the military, recommended him to the club, and after impressing in the tryouts he signed up for the 1944 season.

In his debut game against Collingwood, he kicked 9 goals, at the time a league record and still the club record, eventually finishing the year with 51 goals. He missed the 1945 season due to war service but returned in 1946 and topped the club's goalkicking for three successive seasons. His best tally came in 1947 when he kicked 75 goals in just 16 games. He had previously been Footscray's leading goalkicker in his debut season and for the fifth time in 1950.

Footscray made the finals in 1951 but Wood spent the entire 1st Semi Final on the bench and didn't re-sign with the club the following season.
