= Alex Clarke (Australian footballer) =

Australian rules footballer (1907–1984)

Personal information
- Full name: Alexander Archibald Clarke
- Born: 25 May 1907
- Died: 20 June 1984 (aged 77); New South Wales
- Original team: Albury
- Height: 180 cm (5 ft 11 in)
- Weight: 81 kg (179 lb)

Playing career^{1}
Years	Club	Games (Goals)
1930–1931, 1933	North Melbourne	15 (0)
- ^{1} Playing statistics correct to the end of 1933.

Alexander Archibald Clarke (25 May 1907 – 20 June 1984) was an Australian rules footballer who played for the North Melbourne Football Club in the Victorian Football League (VFL).
