= Wennie van Lint =

Australian rules footballer

Personal information
- Full name: Wenceslaus Joseph van Lint
- Born: 28 March 1948 (age 78); Haarlem, Netherlands
- Original teams: Tintaldra-Khancoban, Albury
- Height: 183 cm (6 ft 0 in)
- Weight: 80 kg (176 lb)

Playing career^{1}
Years	Club	Games (Goals)
1967	South Melbourne	2 (0)
- ^{1} Playing statistics correct to the end of 1967.

Wenceslaus Joseph van Lint (born 28 March 1948) is a former Australian rules footballer who played with South Melbourne in the Victorian Football League (VFL).

Van Lint arrived in Australia in 1952 and initially played with Khancoban - Tintaldra FC in the Upper Murray Football League before playing in Albury's 1966 Ovens & Murray Football League premiership.

van Lint played two games for South Melbourne in 1967 while completing his economics degree at Monash University. He qualified as a Certified Public Accountant and was awarded a Master of Business Administration from Melbourne University in 1979.
