= Don Seymour (footballer) =

Australian rules footballer, born 1916

Personal information
- Full name: Donald George Seymour
- Born: 16 March 1916; Albury, New South Wales
- Died: 23 July 1986 (aged 70); Shepparton, Victoria
- Original team: Albury
- Height: 170 cm (5 ft 7 in)
- Weight: 67 kg (148 lb)

Playing career^{1}
| Years | Club | Games (Goals) |
| 1939 | Footscray | 2 (0) |
- ^{1} Playing statistics correct to the end of 1939.

Donald George Seymour (16 March 1916 – 23 July 1986) was an Australian rules footballer who played with Footscray in the Victorian Football League (VFL).

Seymour was recruited to Footscray from the Albury Football Club in the Ovens & Murray Football League and won the Footscray Reserves best and fairest award in both 1938 and 1939. He made two appearances in the Footscray senior team, both in 1939.

Seymour was also a professional athletic foot-runner who ran in the Stawell Gift.

Seymour served in the Australian Army during World War II from 1940 to 1945 and also played with the South Sydney Football Club during these years.
