= Bernie Brady =

Australian rules footballer

Personal information
- Full name: Bernie Brady
- Born: 31 August 1947 (age 79)
- Original teams: Junior Magpies (Wangaratta), Albury
- Height: 193 cm (6 ft 4 in)
- Weight: 86 kg (190 lb)

Playing career^{1}
Years	Club	Games (Goals)
1968	Collingwood	1 (0)
- ^{1} Playing statistics correct to the end of 1968.

Bernie Brady (born 31 August 1947) is a former Australian rules footballer who played one game for the Collingwood Football Club in the Victorian Football League (VFL) in 1968.
