= Don Mattson =

Australian rules footballer (1955–2025)

Personal information
- Full name: Donald Leslie Mattson
- Born: 30 October 1955
- Died: 2 April 2025 (aged 69)
- Original teams: Chiltern (OKFL), Albury
- Height: 191 cm (6 ft 3 in)
- Weight: 91 kg (201 lb)

Playing career
Years	Club	Games (Goals)
1976	Richmond	7 (0)
1977	Essendon	1 (0)
Total		8 (0)

Donald Leslie Mattson (30 October 1955 – 2 April 2025) was an Australian rules footballer who played with Richmond and Essendon in the Victorian Football League (VFL).

== Biography ==
Mattson, originally from Chiltern in the Ovens & King Football League, started his VFL career at North Melbourne.

At North Melbourne he played only at reserves level, then was traded to Richmond for Bill Nettlefold and made seven senior appearances for his new club in the 1976 season.

This was followed by a season with Essendon in 1977, when he played one league game, which was a draw with Richmond at Waverley Park. He came on as a reserve in that game, which is best remembered for Tim Watson making his debut, aged just 15.

In 1978 he continued his career in Sydney, with Newtown and represented NSW at the 1978 Country Football Championships in Wagga Wagga.

Mattson died on 2 April 2025, at the age of 69.
