= Artie Percy =

Australian rules footballer

Personal information
- Full name: Arthur Hugh Percy
- Born: 5 April 1880; Albury, New South Wales
- Died: 14 July 1964 (aged 84); Albury, New South Wales
- Original team: Albury

Playing career^{1}
Years	Club	Games (Goals)
1904	South Melbourne	2 (0)
- ^{1} Playing statistics correct to the end of 1904.

Arthur Hugh Percy (5 April 1880 – 14 July 1964) was an Australian rules footballer who played for the South Melbourne Football Club in the Victorian Football League (VFL).
