= Frank Beggs =

Australian rules footballer, born 1904

Personal information
- Full name: Francis Charles Beggs
- Born: 22 May 1904; Violet Town, Victoria
- Died: 27 November 1969 (aged 65); Parkville, Victoria
- Original teams: Albury, West Albury
- Position: Ruckman

Playing career^{1}
Years	Club	Games (Goals)
1930	Fitzroy	4 (0)
- ^{1} Playing statistics correct to the end of 1930.

Francis Charles Beggs (22 May 1904 – 27 November 1969) was an Australian rules footballer who played with Fitzroy in the Victorian Football League (VFL).

Beggs was originally from the Albury Football Club and played in their 1928 Ovens and Murray Football League premiership.

Beggs then played with the West Albury Football Club in 1929.

Beggs was cleared to Fitzroy along with Haydn Bunton, both from the West Albury Football Club in 1930.
