= Hope Evans =

Australian rules footballer, born 1902

Personal information
- Full name: Francis Hope Evans
- Born: 13 May 1902; Carlton, Victoria
- Died: 2 October 1991 (aged 89)
- Original team: Albury

Playing career^{1}
Years	Club	Games (Goals)
1925	Carlton	7 (0)
- ^{1} Playing statistics correct to the end of 1925.

Francis Hope Evans (13 May 1902 – 2 October 1991) was an Australian rules footballer who played with Carlton in the Victorian Football League (VFL).

Evans was recruited from Albury Federals Football Club.
