= Bill Lieschke =

Australian rules footballer and umpire

William E. Lieschke

Personal information
- Full name: Bill Lieschke
- Born: 17 November 1944 (age 81)
- Died: 16 January 2015 (aged 70)
- Original teams: Swan Hill, Albury
- Height: 177 cm (5 ft 10 in)
- Weight: 73 kg (161 lb)
- Position: Back pocket

Playing career^{1}
Years	Club	Games (Goals)
1962	Essendon	1 (0)
- ^{1} Playing statistics correct to the end of 1962.

Bill Lieschke (17 November 1944 – 16 January 2015) was an Australian rules footballer who played with Essendon in the Victorian Football League (VFL). Lieschke rejoined one of his old clubs, Albury, after his time with the Bombers. He also played with Acton and Natimuk before becoming an umpire.
