= Bill Strang (footballer) =

Australian rules footballer

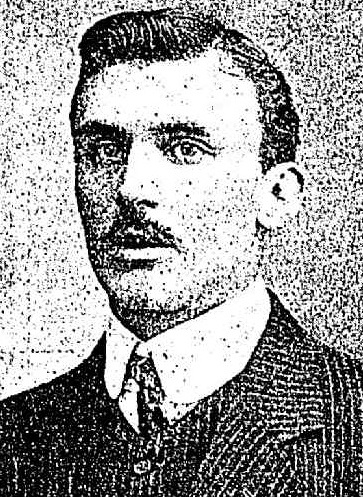
- Strang in 1905

Personal information
- Full name: William James Strang
- Born: 7 October 1883; Albury, New South Wales
- Died: 9 May 1937 (aged 53); Albury, New South Wales
- Original team: Albury

Playing career^{1}
Years	Club	Games (Goals)
1904–1907, 1913	South Melbourne	69 (80)
- ^{1} Playing statistics correct to the end of 1913.

William James Strang (7 October 1883 – 9 May 1937) was an Australian rules footballer who played with South Melbourne in the Victorian Football League (VFL).

== Family ==
He married Frances Eleanor Collins in 1905.

Four sons played senior football in the VFL; Allan and Colin as well as Richmond premiership stars of the 1930s Doug and Gordon. Two grandsons were members of the Tigers' premiership team in 1967, Geoff Strang (son of Doug) and John Perry (son of his daughter Edna "Bob" Perry, née Strang), with Geoff backing up again in 1969.

Strang was also a Justice of the Peace (J.P.) in Albury.

== Football ==
Strang was a strong aerialist from Albury, used as both a follower and forward. He kicked three of South Melbourne's six goals, from centre half-forward, in their 1907 VFL Grand Final loss to Carlton.

Strang spent the next period of his career in New South Wales. After returning to Albury to start a business, he played for the Albury Football Club.

Strang returned to South Melbourne in 1913 and was the club's leading goal-kicker with 29 goals.

== Military service ==
He served overseas with the First AIF in the 1st Light Horse Field Ambulance.

== Death ==
He died (suddenly) at Albury on 9 May 1937.
