= Gary Gray (footballer) =

Australian rules footballer

Personal information
- Full name: Gary Gray
- Born: 22 November 1953 (age 72)
- Original team: Albury
- Height: 183 cm (6 ft 0 in)
- Weight: 78 kg (172 lb)

Playing career^{1}
Years	Club	Games (Goals)
1972 - 1976	North Melbourne	2 (0)
- ^{1} Playing statistics correct to the end of 1976.

Gary Gray (born 22 November 1953) is a former Australian rules footballer who played with North Melbourne in the Victorian Football League (VFL).

Gray was recruited from Albury and initially played with the North Melbourne Under 17's and Under 19, then played two consecutive VFL senior matches in rounds two and three in 1976.

Gray played in North Melbourne's losing 1976 VFL Reserves grand final side against Collingwood.

Gray finished fourth in the final of the 1978 and 1980 Stawell Gift.
