= Les Frauenfelder =

Australian rules footballer

Personal information
- Full name: Edward Leslie Frauenfelder
- Born: 26 February 1888; Murtoa, Victoria
- Died: 26 July 1955 (aged 67); Fitzroy, Victoria
- Original team: Albury
- Height: 180 cm (5 ft 11 in)

Playing career^{1}
Years	Club	Games (Goals)
1910	Richmond	2 (2)
- ^{1} Playing statistics correct to the end of 1910.

Edward Leslie Frauenfelder (26 February 1888 – 26 July 1955) was an Australian rules footballer who played with Richmond in the Victorian Football League (VFL).

== Family ==
The son of August Henry Frauenfelder (1855-1916), and Emma Maria Frauenfelder (1864-1895), née Burton, Edward Leslie Frauenfelder was born at Murtoa, Victoria on 26 February 1888.

== Football ==
Recruited from Albury, Frauenfelder played his first senior match for Richmond, against South Melbourne, at the Lake Oval, on 30 April 1910. He was one of the seven players who made their debut in that match, the first of the 1910 season: the other six were: Ernest Carter, Alick Davison, Frank Ellis, Mick Maguire, Bobby Scott, and Vic Thorp.

== Death ==
He died on 26 July 1955.
