= Barbara Strang =

English language scholar (1925–1982)

- Born: 20 April 1925; Penge
- Died: 11 April 1982 (aged 56); Morpeth
- Known for: scholar of the English Language
- Spouse: Colin Strang
- Children: one

Barbara Strang née Barbara Mary Hope Carr later Lady Strang (20 April 1925 – 11 April 1982) was a British English language scholar. She was the first Chair of English Language and General Linguistics at Newcastle University.

== Life ==
Strang was born in Penge, London, in 1925. Her parents were Frederick and Amy Carr. Her schooling was affected by the war as her convent school in Croydon was moved to Wales and for her first year at King's College, London she was attending lectures in Bristol.

She married Colin Strang who was a lecturer and the heir apparent to his father's barony. She established her name when her first publication Modern English Structure in 1962 became a standard work. Two years later she became the first Professor of English Language and General Linguistics at the University of Newcastle upon Tyne in 1964. This was the first chair of its kind in England, just as she was one of the first women to hold such a post. It was a novel appointment and her new department established an international reputation.

In 1970 she published A History of English.

== Death and legacy ==
Strang died suddenly of a brain hemorrhage at her home in Morpeth in 1982. In 1988 a collection of essays on English linguistics was published in her memory. Her university named the Barbara Strang Teaching Centre after her.

== Works ==
- Modern English Structure. London: E. Arnold, 1962.
- A History of English. London: Methuen, 1970.
