= Geoff Strang =

Australian rules footballer

Personal information
- Born: 9 May 1944
- Died: 20 December 2003 (aged 59)
- Original team: Albury
- Height: 185 cm (6 ft 1 in)
- Weight: 85.5 kg (188 lb)

Playing career^{1}
Years	Club	Games (Goals)
1960-1964	Albury Football Club	99 (0)
1965-1971	Richmond	88 (0)
1972-1974	North Adelaide Football Club	31 (5)
Total		218 (5)
- ^{1} Playing statistics correct to the end of 1971.

Career highlights
- Richmond Premiership Player 1967, 1969

Geoff Strang (9 May 1944 – 20 December 2003) was an Australian rules footballer who played in the Victorian Football League (VFL) in between 1965 and 1971 for the Richmond Football Club.

== Family ==
He was the grandson of South Melbourne footballer Bill Strang, the son of Richmond premiership player Doug Strang, nephew of dual Richmond premiership player Gordon Strang, South Melbourne footballer Allan Strang (1921-1996), and St Kilda footballer Colin Strang, and the cousin of John Perry, who also played in the 1967 Richmond premiership team.

== Football ==
He left Richmond at the end of 1971 to play under the coaching of his former Richmond team mate Mike Patterson at North Adelaide Football Club. He played a fine game for the Roosters in their 56 point win over Port Adelaide in the 1972 SANFL Grand Final.
