= Keith Thomas (footballer, born 1929) =

Australian rules footballer

Personal information
- Full name: Keith Frederick Thomas
- Born: 15 April 1929
- Died: 27 October 2017 (aged 88)
- Original team: Albury
- Height: 178 cm (5 ft 10 in)
- Weight: 67 kg (148 lb)

Playing career^{1}
| Years | Club | Games (Goals) |
| 1954 | South Melbourne | 2 (0) |
- ^{1} Playing statistics correct to the end of 1954.

Keith Frederick Thomas (15 April 1929 – 27 October 2017) was an Australian rules footballer who played with South Melbourne in the Victorian Football League (VFL). He died on 27 October 2017, at the age of 88.
