= Barry Takle =

Australian rules footballer (born 1935)

Personal information
- Full name: Barry Takle
- Born: 12 January 1935 (age 91)
- Original team: Albury
- Height: 188 cm (6 ft 2 in)
- Weight: 86 kg (190 lb)

Playing career^{1}
Years	Club	Games (Goals)
1955	Hawthorn	4 (1)
- ^{1} Playing statistics correct to the end of 1955.

Barry Takle (born 12 January 1935) is a former Australian rules footballer who played for the Hawthorn Football Club in the Victorian Football League (VFL).
