= Baron Strang =

Extinct barony in the Peerage of the United Kingdom

Baron Strang, of Stonesfield in the County of Oxford, was a title in the Peerage of the United Kingdom. It was created on 16 January 1954 for the prominent diplomat Sir William Strang, Permanent Under-Secretary of State for Foreign Affairs from 1949 to 1953. The title passed to his only son, the second Baron, who succeeded in 1978. He was a retired Professor of Philosophy at Newcastle University. There was no heir to the barony, which became extinct on his death in 2014.

== Barons Strang (1954) ==
- William Strang, 1st Baron Strang (1893–1978)
- Colin Strang, 2nd Baron Strang (1922–2014)
