= Alick Wyers =

English cricketer

Cricket information
- Batting: Right-handed

Career statistics
Competition	First-class
Matches	1
Runs scored	3
Batting average	3.00
100s/50s	0/0
Top score	3
Catches/stumpings	0/0
- Source: CricInfo, 7 November 2022

Alick Wyers (15 December 1907 – 28 November 1980) was an English first-class cricketer who played in one match for Worcestershire against Glamorgan in July 1927. He made just 3 in his only innings before being out lbw to Jack Mercer.

Wyers was born in Droitwich, Worcestershire. He died short of his 73rd birthday in Kidderminster; also in Worcestershire.
