= Dundonald House =

Building in Northern Ireland

Coordinates: 54°35′45″N 5°49′36″W

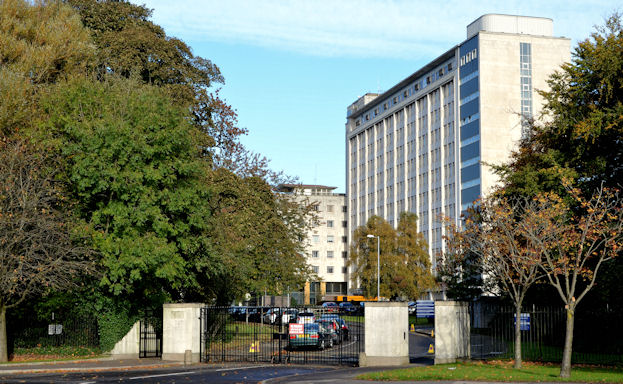
Dundonald House

Dundonald House is a government building in Belfast, Northern Ireland. Built in 1962 it housed the Department of Agriculture and Rural Development, the Geological Survey of Northern Ireland and the Northern Ireland Prison Service until 2023 when the building closed on safety grounds. It is a grade B+ listed building and survived an application for its demolition in 2024.

== Description ==
Dundonald House was built in the early 1960s to a design in the International Style by Belfast architect Robert Hanna Gibson. It consists of two office blocks linked by an entrance cube; the seven-storey northern block is curved while the twelve-storey southern block is rectangular in plan. The building features canopies and roofscape of architectural interest. It is clad in Portland limestone. The site received protection as a grade B+ listed building in 2021.

== Use ==
Dundonald House is situated in the Stormont Estate along with several other Northern Ireland Civil Service buildings. It was the headquarters of the Department of Agriculture and Rural Development, the Geological Survey of Northern Ireland and the Northern Ireland Prison Service. Security concerns were raised at the site in 2003 after 30 protestors forced their way past reception and up to the sixth floor. The protestors were raising concerns over a policy that made republican prisoners share cells with loyalists. The Prison Officers' Association raised concerns that sensitive documents relating to the personal details of serving officers may have been visible to the protestors but the Northern Ireland Prison Service stated that all confidential information was stored in secure filing cabinets.

The building was vacated in 2023 on safety grounds after masonry fell from the roof. The Northern Ireland Civil Service Sports Association applied to Belfast City Council for permission to demolish the building to make way for a sports centre, but withdrew the application in 2024. The structure has been placed on the heritage at risk register. An exclusion zone is in place around the building on safety grounds.

== See also ==
- Northern Ireland Office
