= Allan Strang =

Australian rules footballer

Personal information
- Full name: Robert Allan Strang
- Born: 11 October 1921; Albury, New South Wales
- Died: 4 February 1996 (aged 74)
- Original team: Albury
- Height: 185 cm (6 ft 1 in)
- Weight: 86 kg (190 lb)

Playing career^{1}
Years	Club	Games (Goals)
1947–1948	South Melbourne	15 (17)
1949	Williamstown (VFA)	21 (10)
- ^{1} Playing statistics correct to the end of 1948.

Career highlights
- 1949 VFA Premiership

Robert Allan Strang (11 October 1921 – 4 February 1996) was an Australian rules footballer who played for the South Melbourne Football Club in the Victorian Football League (VFL).

He was the brother of Richmond premiership players Doug & Gordon Strang and St Kilda footballer Colin Strang,

Strang who was a marking forward was recruited after talent scouts saw him in a practice match between Albury and the Army. He spent two years playing for St George in Sydney before moving to Melbourne to play for the same team his father did between 1904 and 1913. In 1949, he was cleared to play with Williamstown. Strang accepted a contract to captain coach the Wagga Tigers in 1950.

He was the uncle of dual Richmond premiership player Geoff Strang, and the uncle of Richmond premiership player John Perry.
