= Syd Wright =

Australian rules footballer

Personal information
- Full name: Sydney Young Wright
- Born: 15 September 1882; Petersham, New South Wales
- Died: 23 April 1952 (aged 69); Albury, New South Wales
- Original team: Albury

Playing career^{1}
Years	Club	Games (Goals)
1904	South Melbourne	3 (0)
- ^{1} Playing statistics correct to the end of 1904.

Sydney Young Wright (15 September 1882 – 23 April 1952) was an Australian rules footballer who played with South Melbourne in the Victorian Football League (VFL).
