= Tom Davey (footballer, born 1916) =

Australian rules footballer (1916–1978)

Personal information
- Full name: Thomas William Davey
- Born: 15 November 1916; Albury, New South Wales
- Died: 26 March 1978 (aged 61); Albury, New South Wales
- Height: 183 cm (6 ft 0 in)
- Weight: 85 kg (187 lb)

Playing career^{1}
Years	Club	Games (Goals)
1939	Hawthorn	2 (0)
- ^{1} Playing statistics correct to the end of 1939.

Thomas William "Tom" Davey (15 November 1916 – 26 March 1978) was an Australian rules footballer who played with Hawthorn in the Victorian Football League (VFL).

After his brief football career Davey served in World War II, enlisting in April 1943 and serving until the end of the war.
