= Peter Taylor (Australian footballer) =

Australian rules footballer

Personal information
- Full name: Peter Taylor
- Born: 25 August 1954 (age 72)
- Original team: Albury
- Height: 189 cm (6 ft 2 in)
- Weight: 81 kg (179 lb)

Playing career^{1}
Years	Club	Games (Goals)
1974	North Melbourne	1 (0)
- ^{1} Playing statistics correct to the end of 1974.

Peter Taylor (born 25 August 1954) is a former Australian rules footballer who played with North Melbourne in the Victorian Football League (VFL).
