= County Hall, London =

County building in London, England

County Hall
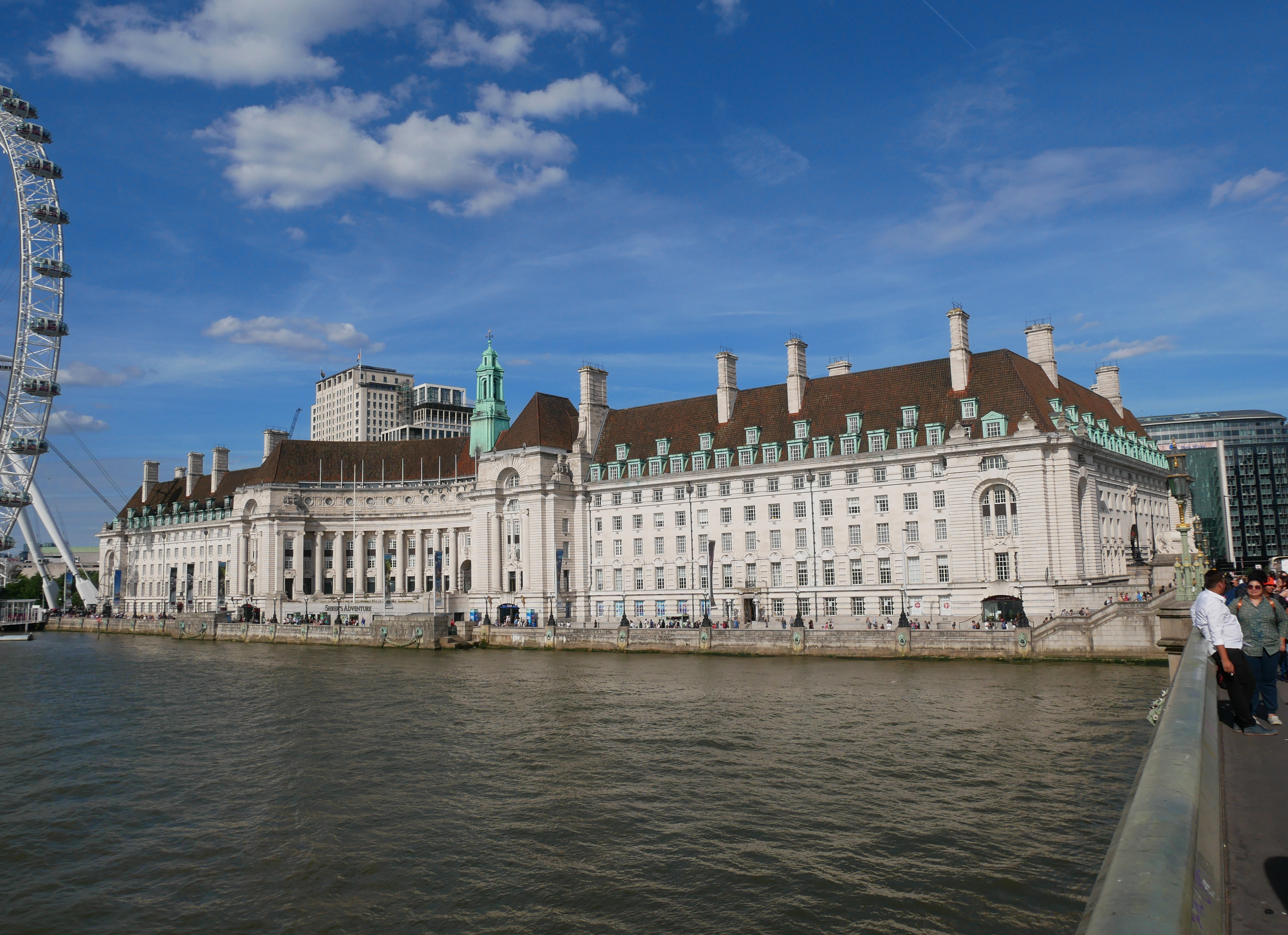
- County Hall from Westminster Bridge

- Shown in Lambeth
- 51°30′7″N 0°7′8″W
- Location: Lambeth

History
- Built: 1911–1939; 87 years ago

Site notes
- Architect: Ralph Knott
- Architectural style: Edwardian Baroque style

Listed Building – Grade II*
- Designated: 19 October 1951
- Reference no.: 1358192

County Hall (sometimes called London County Hall) is a building in the district of Lambeth, London that was the headquarters of the London County Council and later the Greater London Council. The building is on the South Bank of the River Thames, beside Westminster Bridge. It faces west toward the City of Westminster and is close to the Palace of Westminster. The nearest London Underground stations are Waterloo and Westminster. It is a Grade II* listed building.

== History ==
County Office Site (London) Act 1906
- Act of Parliament
- Parliament of the United Kingdom
- Long title: An Act to empower the London County Council to acquire lands for county offices and to construct an embankment in the River Thames and for other purposes.
- Citation: 6 Edw. 7. c. lxxxvi

Dates
- Royal assent: 20 July 1906

Text of statute as originally enacted

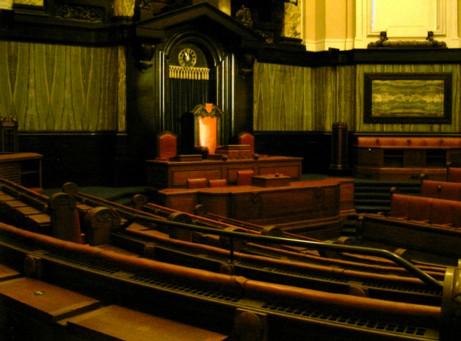
Council Chamber of the London County Council, from the majority benches

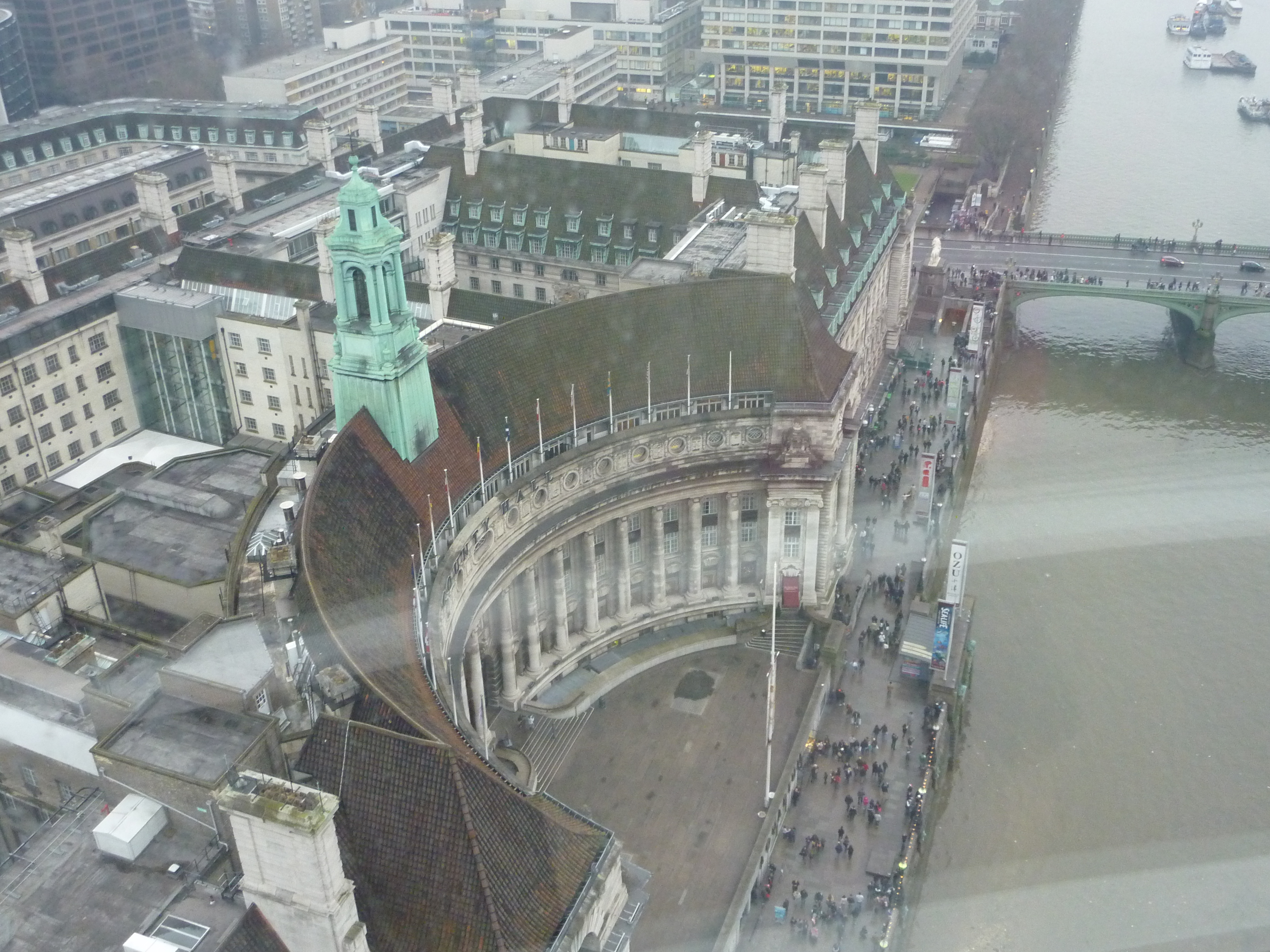
County Hall seen from the London Eye

The building was commissioned to replace the mid 19th-century Spring Gardens headquarters inherited from the Metropolitan Board of Works. The site selected by civic leaders was previously occupied by four properties: Float Mead (occupied by Simmond's flour mills), Pedlar's Acre (occupied by wharves and houses), Bishop's Acre (occupied by Crosse & Blackwell's factory) and the Four Acres (occupied by workshops and stables). It was compulsorily purchased using powers granted by the County Office Site (London) Act 1906 (6 Edw. 7. c. lxxxvi).

The main six storey building was designed by Ralph Knott. It is faced in Portland stone in an Edwardian Baroque style. The construction, which was undertaken by Holland, Hannen & Cubitts, started in 1911 and the building was opened by King George V in 1922. The North and South blocks, which were built by Higgs and Hill, were added between 1936 and 1939. The Island block was not completed until 1974.

In 1945, the World Trade Union Conference took place at the hall.

The Island Block was built on what was then a roundabout (now a peninsula) between County Hall, St Thomas' Hospital and Waterloo Station. It was notable to the passing public for three main reasons: it was of a completely different architectural character to any of the other nearby buildings, it had no entrances at ground level (though there were emergency exits), being accessible only by a bridge and a tunnel both from the SE County Hall building, and it had orange sunshades, designed to be lowered and raised together automatically when the sun shone, rather than by local control which would look less pleasing on the outside. The controls quickly malfunctioned, leaving the unwanted "random" effect while also causing excess heat and glare inside the building which the occupants could not control. Disliked by many Londoners, it was nonetheless considered "distinguished" by its architect and some other experts, and noted as an early example of open-plan office interior, which should have been listed.

For 64 years County Hall served as the headquarters of local government for London. During the 1980s the then powerful Labour-controlled Greater London Council (GLC) led by Ken Livingstone was locked in conflict with the Conservative national government of Margaret Thatcher. The façade of County Hall frequently served as a billboard for opposition slogans which could be seen from the Palace of Westminster.

When the government of Margaret Thatcher abolished the GLC in 1986, County Hall lost its role as the seat of London's government. Talk soon became of what was to happen to the building, and there were plans to relocate the London School of Economics to the site which did not proceed. The building remained in use by the Inner London Education Authority (ILEA) until its abolition in 1990 when the building was transferred to the London Residuary Body and eventually sold to Shirayama Shokusan, a Japanese investor. On 21 October 2005, the High Court of England and Wales upheld a bid by Shokusan to have the Saatchi Gallery evicted on the grounds of violating its contract, particularly for using space outside of the rented area for exhibits.

The Island Block was demolished in 2006 to make way for a hotel, the Park Plaza Westminster Bridge. The building, also known as No 1 Westminster Bridge Road, had been disused since 1986 and had been described as an eyesore.

A blue plaque commemorates the London County Council (LCC), GLC and the Inner London Education Authority at County Hall.

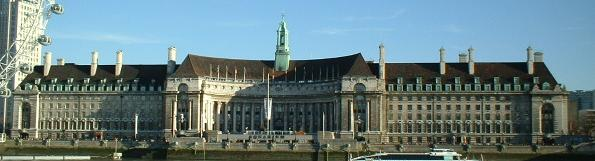
Front view of the hall, 2008

== Attractions ==
County Hall is the site of a number of leisure attractions including a hub for Merlin Entertainments, which operates the Sea Life London Aquarium in its basement, London Dungeon, Shrek's Adventure! and London Eye in and around the building.

In 2007, County Hall hosted Star Wars: The Exhibition. The exhibition featured original costumes, props, and vehicles from the Star Wars film series and was created to commemorate the 30th anniversary of the original film's release.

From 2008 to 2012, the building was home to the London Film Museum founded by Jonathan Sands, which exhibited original props, costumes and sets from a variety of feature films.

Since October 2017, the old council chamber has hosted a site-specific production of Agatha Christie's Witness for the Prosecution.

The site also hosts venues, offering ready-to-book spaces for meetings, trainings and conferences for up to 400 people.

== Hotels ==
There are two hotels located in County Hall:

- Premier Inn, Premier Inn London County Hall hotel
- Marriott, London Marriott Hotel County Hall
