= Colin Strang, 2nd Baron Strang =

British philosopher (1922–2014)

Colin Strang
- Born: Colin Strang; 1922; England
- Died: 2014 (aged 91–92); London, England

Philosophical work
- Main interests: philosophy
- Notable works: '

Colin Strang, 2nd Baron Strang (12 June 1922 – 19 December 2014) was a British professor of philosophy and hereditary peer.

== Life ==
Strang was the only son of William Strang, 1st Baron Strang, a diplomat who served as Permanent Under-Secretary at the Foreign Office from 1949 to 1953, and was subsequently the first Convenor of the Crossbench peers in the House of Lords from 1968 to 1974.

Strang was a lecturer in philosophy at Queens University, Belfast from 1951 to 1953 and at King's College, Newcastle from 1953 to 1975. He was Professor of Philosophy at University of Newcastle from 1975 to 1982 and Dean of Faculty of Arts at University of Newcastle from 1976 to 1979.

He succeeded to the title in 1978. He married the English scholar Barbara Strang and they had one daughter. He married again twice. The peerage became extinct on his death in 2014.

== Works ==
- 'What If Everyone Did That?' Durham University Journal, vol. 53 (1960), pp. 5–10.
- 'The Perception of Heat'. Proceedings of the Aristotelian Society, vol. 61, issue 1 (June 1961), pp. 239–252 (1961)
- 'Tripartite Souls, Ancient and Modern'. Apeiron, vol. 16 (1982), pp. 1–11.

Peerage of the United Kingdom
| Preceded by William Strang | Baron Strang; 1978–2014 | Extinct |
