= Laurie Plunkett =

Australian rules footballer, born 1910

Personal information
- Full name: Lawrence Valentine Emerson Plunkett
- Born: 29 March 1910; Albury, New South Wales
- Died: 25 March 1999 (aged 88)
- Original team: Albury Rovers / West Albury

Playing career^{1}
Years	Club	Games (Goals)
1932	Fitzroy	2 (0)
- ^{1} Playing statistics correct to the end of 1932.

Lawrence Valentine Emerson Plunkett (29 March 1910 – 25 March 1999) was an Australian rules footballer who played with Fitzroy in the Victorian Football League (VFL).
