= Ralph Knott =

British architect

Ralph Knott FRIBA
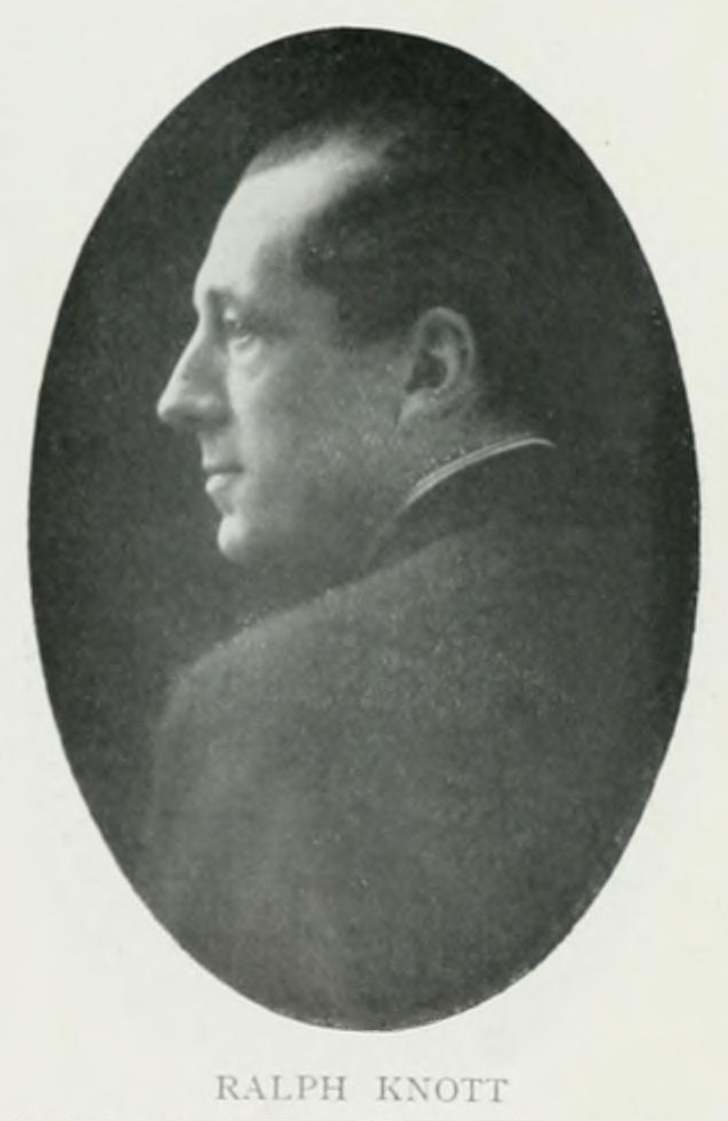
- Photographic portrait of Ralph Knott.
- Born: 3 May 1878; Chelsea, London, England
- Died: 25 January 1929 (aged 50); Mortlake, London, England
- Education: Architectural Association
- Occupation: Architect
- Spouse: Ada Knott (m. 1919)
- Parent(s): Samuel and Elizabeth Knott

Ralph Knott FRIBA (3 May 1878 – 25 January 1929) was a British architect. He was responsible for building the massive six-storey "Edwardian Baroque" style County Hall building for the London County Council.

== Biography ==
Ralph Knott was born in Chelsea, London, on 3 May 1878, the youngest son of Samuel Knott, a tailor, and his wife, Elizabeth (née White), from Dorset. After attending the City of London School he was articled to Woodd and Ainslie, architects. He was taught etching by Frank Brangwyn at the Architectural Association and when his articles were finished, joined Sir Aston Webb, in whose office he remained for eight years. Webb was a keen participant in architectural competitions and Knott's etching skill was valued in winning them. He drew the etchings which enabled Webb to win the competition for the Queen Victoria memorial outside Buckingham Palace, also working on the designs of Admiralty Arch and the Victoria and Albert Museum.

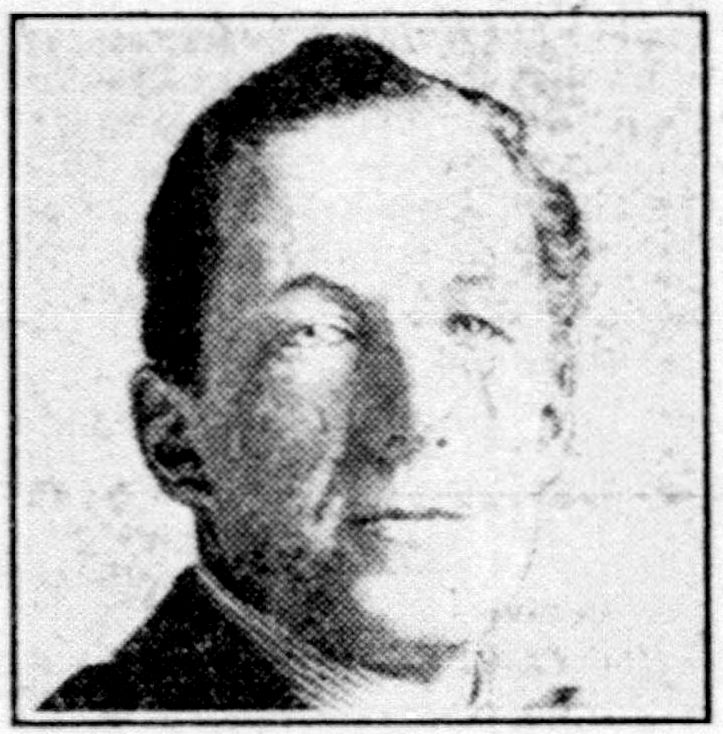
Ralph Knott in 1921.

In 1908 Knott and E. Stone Collins set up their own practice as Knott and Collins, architects. The first substantial commission they applied for was for offices for the London County Council. Despite many very well known names entering, Knott won at the age of 29. Designs for the construction were brought to life by the architect and perspectivist Alick Horsnell. His design was altered significantly before construction began, including the familiar semicircular terrace being moved from the land to the river-side of the building. Construction was held up by the First World War, during which Knott worked on designs for Royal Air Force bases, and partially completed in 1922 (except for the northern third). In June 1921 he was elected a fellow of the Royal Institute of British Architects.

In the years before World War I Knott's work included the design and erection of mansions in the Westminster and Chelsea districts of London. In 1917 Knott was the designer of the Daily Mail £200 cottage, a distinct departure from the more elaborate architecture for which he was known.

After the opening of the London County Hall, at the southern end of Westminster Bridge, Knott built other notable buildings, including two departmental office blocks at Stormont near Belfast. In 1925 he designed the pavilion at the City of London School's new athletics grounds in Grove Park. The building was a memorial to the alumni of the school who had perished in the First World War, and he donated his services free of charge. He had begun the work on the last part of County Hall in 1928 but it remained uncompleted at his death.

In 1919 Knott married Ada (née Brown), widow of Sidney James Longden. They had no children. He died suddenly at his Mortlake home in January 1929, aged 50. A bronze plaque to his memory at County Hall was unveiled by the Chairman of the London County Council in June 1932.
