= Gordon Strang =

Australian rules footballer and coach

Personal information
- Full name: William Gordon Strang
- Born: 10 February 1908; Waverley, New South Wales
- Died: 8 October 1951 (aged 43); Wodonga, Victoria
- Original teams: Jindera, East Albury
- Debut: 2 May 1931 (round 1), Richmond vs. Carlton, at Princes Park
- Height: 185 cm (6 ft 1 in)
- Weight: 82.5 kg (182 lb)

Playing career^{1}
Years	Club	Games (Goals)
1931–1936, 1938	Richmond	116 (108)
- ^{1} Playing statistics correct to the end of 1938.

Career highlights
- Richmond Premiership Player 1932, 1934; Interstate Games:- 9; Richmond – Team of the Century

William Gordon "Cocker" Strang (10 February 1908 – 8 October 1951) was an Australian rules footballer who played in the Victorian Football League for the Richmond Football Club between 1931 and 1936.

== Family ==
He was the son of Bill Strang, who played for South Melbourne between 1904 and 1913 (and was South Melbourne's leading goal-kicker in 1913)

He was the brother of Richmond premiership player Doug Strang and uncle of dual Richmond premiership player Geoff Strang and 1967 Tiger's premiership player John Perry. His (and Doug's) other brothers, Colin Strang and Allan Strang also played VFL football: for St Kilda (2 games, 1933), and South Melbourne (15 games, 1947–1948), respectively.

== Football ==
Strang first came under notice when he kicked 10 goals for Jindera FC in the Albury & Border Football Association, in 1927.

After a year in Tasmania as captain-coach of North Launceston, he returned to Richmond, and played all of Richmond's 18 matches in the 1938 season, scoring 6 goals.

He then transferred to Wodonga as captain-coach in 1939.

=== Richmond ===
Along with his brother Doug (who was selected at full-forward), he made his debut for Richmond in the first round of the 1931 season, on 2 May 1931, at centre half-back; The Argus commented that, on debut, he had "showed grit" and had "kicked well".

=== North Launceston ===
In 1937 he coached North Launceston to runner-up position in the Northern Tasmanian Football Association; and, despite rumours to the contrary, he did not apply for the position of coach in the 1938 season.

=== Richmond ===
He returned to play for Richmond in 1938; and he played in each of Richmond's 18 games that season.

=== Wodonga ===
In May 1939, Strang took over the Railway Hotel in Wodonga and Richmond cleared him to Wodonga.

Strang polled the most votes in the 1939 Ovens and Murray Football League Best & Fairest Award, the Morris Medal, but was suspended by the O&MFL Tribunal during the season. He went onto win the Morris Medal in 1940. He also won Wodonga's best and fairest in 1939 and 1940.

In 1939 he coached Wodonga in a losing Grand Final against an Albury team that was coached by his brother, Doug.

The Ovens and Murray Football League premiers in 1939 was the Albury Football Club.

== Death ==
He collapsed at his residence in Wodonga on 8 October 1951 and, later that day, died at Albury Hospital.
