= Alick Black =

Australian rules footballer (1909–1988)

Personal information
- Full name: Alick Denholm John Black
- Born: 5 March 1909; Richmond, Victoria
- Died: 25 March 1988 (aged 79); Brunswick, Victoria
- Original team: Thornbury

Playing career^{1}
Years	Club	Games (Goals)
1932	South Melbourne	1 (0)
- ^{1} Playing statistics correct to the end of 1932.

Alick Denholm John Black (5 March 1909 – 25 March 1988) was an Australian rules footballer who played for the South Melbourne Football Club in the Victorian Football League (VFL).
