= John Duthie (footballer, born 1951) =

Australian rules footballer

Personal information
- Full name: John Duthie
- Born: 9 February 1951 (age 75)
- Original team: Albury
- Height: 193 cm (6 ft 4 in)
- Weight: 92 kg (203 lb)

Playing career^{1}
Years	Club	Games (Goals)
1969–72	North Melbourne	11 (5)
- ^{1} Playing statistics correct to the end of 1972.

John Duthie (born 9 February 1951) is a former Australian rules footballer who played with North Melbourne in the Victorian Football League (VFL).
