= Stormont Castle =

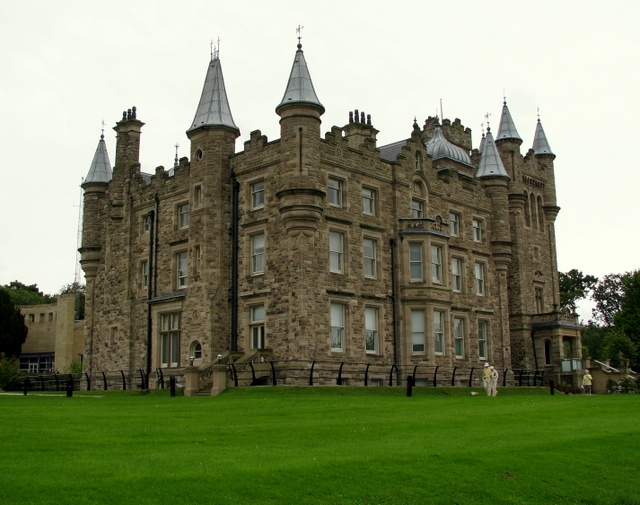
- Coordinates: 54.602003°N 5.830232°W
- Built: c.1830
- Architect: Thomas Turner
- Architectural style: Scottish baronial style

Listed Building – Grade A
- Official name: Castle, former stable block and stone steps
- Designated: 13 March 1987
- Reference no.: HB26/13/014

Stormont Castle is a manor house on the Stormont Estate in east Belfast which is home to the Northern Ireland Executive and the Executive Office. It is a Grade A listed building.

== History ==
Stormont Castle was completed c.1830 and was reworked in 1858 by its original owners, the Cleland family, to the designs of Thomas Turner in the Scottish baronial style with features such as bartizans used for decorative purposes. The building and 235 acres (95 ha) of adjoining land was bought by the newly established Government of Northern Ireland for £15,000 in 1921.

Between 1921 and 1972, it served as the official residence of the Prime Minister of Northern Ireland. However, a number of Prime Ministers chose to live at Stormont House, the official residence of the Speaker of the House of Commons of Northern Ireland, which was empty as a number of Speakers had chosen to live in their own homes. It also served as the meeting place for the Cabinet of the Government of Northern Ireland from 1921 to 1972.

With the imposition of direct rule in 1972, it served as the Belfast headquarters of the Secretary of State for Northern Ireland, Northern Ireland Office (NIO) ministers and supporting officials. During The Troubles, it was also used by MI5 officers. The Good Friday Agreement was concluded in nearby Castle Buildings in April 1998.

A £7.5m renovation was completed in 2001. The work was the most extensive completed since the building's construction and the architect stated that "[the] objective was to create a modern, functioning office space while maintaining the historic character of the building."

The castle is open to the public each year on the European Heritage Open Day weekend.
