= Alick Horsnell =

British architect

Alick Horsnell (1881–1916) was an architect, draughtsmen and artist working in London during the early years of the 20th Century.

== Life ==
Horsnell was born in Chelmsford, Essex, on 12 August 1881. He trained as an architect in the office of Frederick Chancellor FRIBA in Chelmsford. In 1899 he designed a house for Charles Baskett, then assistant master at Chelmsford School of Art, in Maldon Road, Colchester. It is distinctive design in the manner of Voysey, with white walls, green slate roof, and a canopy over the front door on curly iron brackets, and is one of Horsnell's few surviving buildings

While working in Chelmsford he won a travelling studentship from the Architectural Association. He visited France and Italy and the sketches from these visits were well regarded. Many of them were displayed at the RIBA in the summer of 1915 and published in the Building News and Engineering Journal in 1915 and 1916. He won both the Royal Institute of British Architects (RIBA) Tite Prize in 1906 (for Italianate Designs) and the Soane Medallion in 1910, the latter awarded for his design for a Shakespeare Memorial Theatre.

He moved to London, where he worked at 2 South Square, Gray's Inn alongside Charles Gascoyne, George Nott, and Robert Atkinson. During these pre-war years, he worked as an assistant to Ernest Newton and drew perspectives for notable houses in Cheltenham (Greenway, Shurdington) and Lingfield (Ardenrun Place). One of his last great perspectives was the pencil and watercolour of County Hall, London. This perspective brought to life the designs of Ralph Knott. Horsnell's artistic skills were also seen in his etchings, engravings and watercolours. A member of the Royal Society of Painter Etchers, two of his etchings, Rue de Barres, Paris and The Green, Bosham were exhibited at the Royal Academy of Arts in 1910 and one of his watercolours, The Borghese Gardens, was exhibited in 1911.

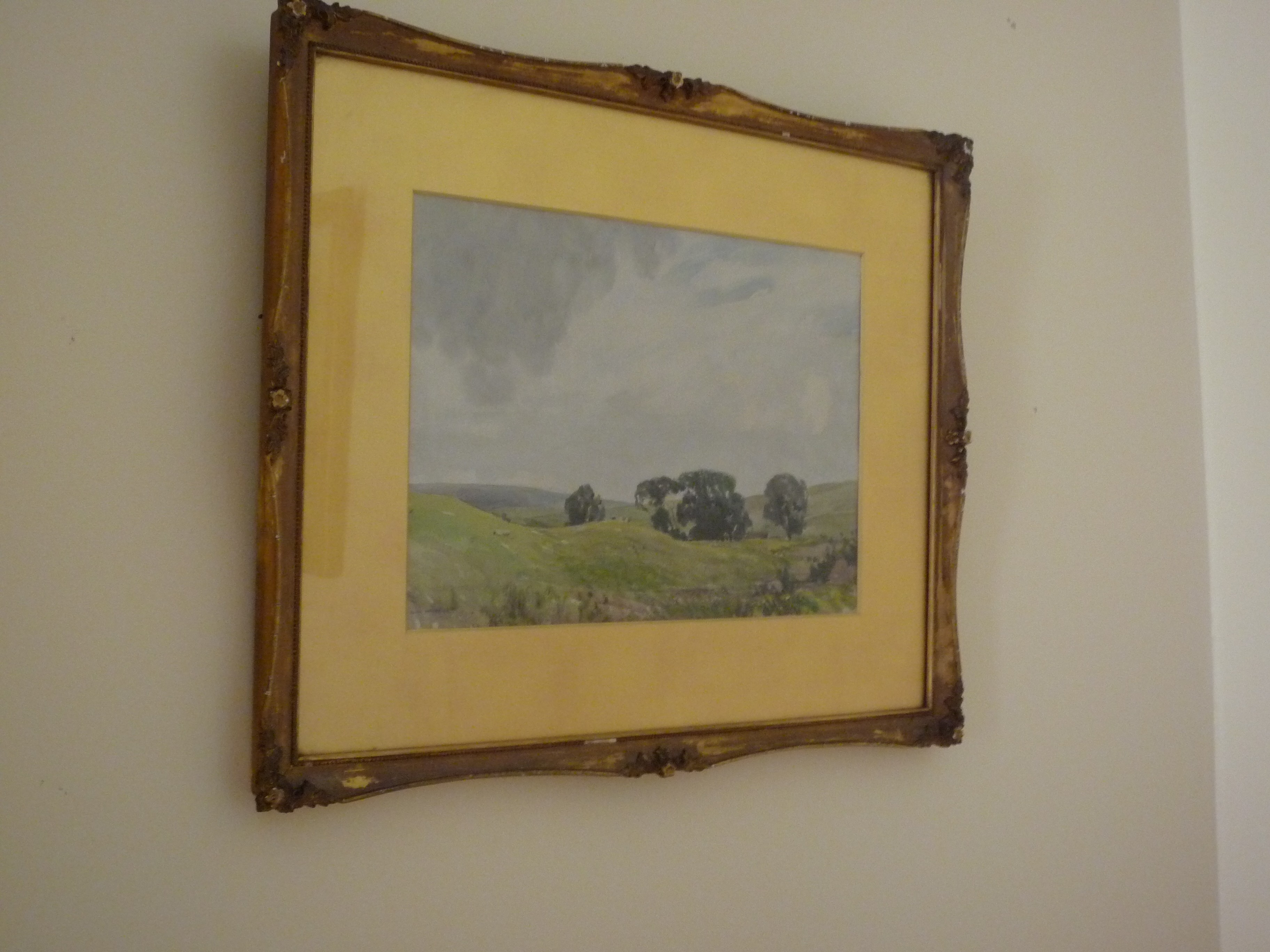
Watercolour by Alick Horsnell, 1882-1916

.

He commenced private practice in April 1914. He came second in the competition to design the Board of Trade Building in Whitehall, a brief won by E. Vincent Harris. His drawings were selected for the scheme to build a town hall for Middleton near Manchester but this scheme was postponed due to the outbreak of war.

At the outbreak of war he served with the 28th London Regiment before being commissioned as a Second Lieutenant in the 7th Suffolk Regiment. He died in on 1 July 1916 on the first day of the battle of the Somme; his name is recorded on the Thiepval Memorial.

Writing in the Essex County Chronicle and Essex Weekly News on 4 August 1916, Arthur Bartlett FRCA said he was

undoubtedly well ahead of any of his contemporaries in the architectural profession, both in his mastery of design and his powers of execution.He was the happy bearer of the spark of genius which lighted his path and allowed him to step out confidently ahead of his fellows. His unerring instinct in matters of taste enabled him to design in the manner of tomorrow rather than follow on the lines of yesterday, while his gift of brilliant draughtsmanship gave him the power of presenting his ideas in the most attractive form. Had he lived till the end of the war to take up his work where he left it, there seems little doubt but that he would have won his way to a foremost place among the architects of the day.

In 1922, collections of his work were given to a number of museums, including the Victoria and Albert Museum, the British Museum and the RIBA British Architectural Library Drawings and Archives Collection by his sister. Further works are held at the Ashmolean Museum, Oxford and the Metropolitan Museum of Art, New York.
