= Doug Strang =

Australian rules footballer (1912–1954)

Personal information
- Full name: Francis Douglas Strang
- Born: 12 July 1912; Waverley, New South Wales
- Died: 28 March 1954 (aged 41); Albury, New South Wales
- Original teams: Jindera, Albury Rovers, East Albury
- Debut: 1931, Richmond vs. Carlton, at Princes Park
- Height: 185 cm (6 ft 1 in)
- Weight: 80 kg (176 lb)

Playing career^{1}
Years	Club	Games (Goals)
1931–1935	Richmond	64 (180)
- ^{1} Playing statistics correct to the end of 1935.

Career highlights
- Richmond Premiership Player 1932; Richmond Leading Goalkicker 1931, 1933

Francis Douglas Strang (12 July 1912 – 28 March 1954) was an Australian rules footballer who played as a full forward in the VFL between 1931 and 1935 for the Richmond Football Club.

== Family ==
He married Ina Lillian McCullough, at Geelong on 18 November 1937.

He was the brother of dual Richmond premiership player Gordon Strang, St Kilda footballer Colin Strang, and South Melbourne footballer Allan Strang. He was the father of dual Richmond premiership player Geoff Strang, and the uncle of Richmond premiership player John Perry.

== Football ==
Strang played with Albury Rovers FC in the Albury & Border Football Association in 1929 and was originally recruited from East Albury after one season in the Ovens and Murray Football League in 1930, as part of a major country recruiting drive by the Tigers, who were eager to break a run of Grand Final losses to Collingwood dating back to 1927.

In just his second VFL game, his 14 goals kicked against North Melbourne in 1931 still stands to this day as the record for the most goals kicked by a Richmond player in a single game, and as the youngest player to kick ten or more goals in a VFL game, at just 18 years and 300 days old.

In his first season Strang’s brilliant overhead marking, in spite of exceptionally wet weather for much of the winter, brought him sixty-eight goals with long drop kicks. In 1932, Strang struggled severely in another rainy winter, but from the time he kicked a goal after the bell to end an eleven match winning streak by Carlton, his brilliant marking asserted itself, most notably in a wonderful display on a dry ground in the second-semi-final.

1933 saw Strang begin to suffer from injuries later in the season. After he had seemingly returned to his best form with ten goals at Arden Street in the thirteenth round, Strang damaged a thigh when playing for the Tigers against the Ballarat League between the fifteenth and sixteenth rounds, and due to knee problems was not at his best when returning for the finals. When the 1934 season opened it was thought Doug Strang would be fully fit, but after one impressive match in the second round against St. Kilda, it was soon discovered that the knee required an operation to repair a slipped disc, and Strang did not play again until the fourteenth round against Carlton. After that, however, the disc incapacitated him once more and he was a passenger on the forward flank by the seventeenth round. These injuries meant Strang left Richmond during 1935. In June 1935, Strang was cleared to Kyneton Football Club where he took over the lease of the Junction Hotel, Kyneton.

Strang was captain/coach of the Kyneton Football Club's 1936 premiership team in Bendigo Football League, before returning to Albury as a hotelier in 1937 and playing in Albury Football Club's 1937 premiership team. after it was thought he would go back to Richmond.

Strang continuing to kick many goals for the Albury Football Club, kicking 126 in 1938 and 117 in 1939. In one game in 1939 he kicked 20 goals against Corowa Football Club. and he captain-coached Albury to two premierships in 1939 and 1940.

== Cricket ==
In addition to his footballing ability, Strang was an excellent bowler in country cricket for a number of years. In consecutive weeks in 1936 he took six wickets for Kyneton.

== Death ==
Strang died at the age of 41 when he was hit by a car on Dean Street in Albury.

== Recognition ==
Strang would later make the Albury Football Club's Team of the Century and be inducted into the O&MFL's - Hall of Fame.

The O&MFL goalkicking award is now known as the Doug Strang Medal.
