= William Strang, 1st Baron Strang =

British diplomat (1893–1978)

Strang in 1947

William Strang, 1st Baron Strang GCB GCMG MBE (2 January 1893 – 27 May 1978) was a British diplomat who served as a leading adviser to the British Government from the 1930s to the 1950s and as Permanent Under-Secretary at the Foreign Office from 1949 to 1953.

During his Foreign Office career, he was involved in the Munich Agreement, the Moscow Conference (1939), the European Advisory Commission, the North Atlantic Treaty, and the post-war occupation of Germany.

== Early life and education ==
Strang was the eldest son of James Strang, a farmer, and his wife Margaret Steven, daughter of William Steven. He was educated at Palmer's School, University College, London and at the Sorbonne.

== Military and diplomatic career ==
Strang was commissioned into the Worcestershire Regiment in 1915 and served in the First World War. He ended the war as a captain.

In 1919, he joined the Diplomatic Service and served at the British embassy in Belgrade from 1919 to 1922, at the Foreign Office from 1922 to 1930 and at the embassy in Moscow from 1930 to 1933. During his time in Moscow he played an important role in the Metro-Vickers engineers trial, in which six British engineers were accused of spying. He returned to the Foreign Office in 1933, and held office as head of the League of Nations section until 1937 and of the Central Department from 1937 to 1939.

During the 1930s he was an adviser to the government at the major international meetings, and met Mussolini, Hitler and Stalin. He was a tacit opponent of appeasement, but always stayed loyal to the government. From 1939 to 1943 he was assistant under-secretary of state for Europe. During the late-1930s, Strang was a member of the Anglo-German Fellowship, which was sympathetic to Nazi Germany.

In May 1939, Strang was sent to Moscow for the talks for a "peace front" of the Soviet Union, France and Britain intended to deter Germany from invading Poland. Strang stated that the new Soviet foreign commissar, Vyacheslav Molotov was an effective, if charmless and crude negotiator who lived up to his surname (Molotov means hammer in Russian).. Strang later wrote of his talks with Molotov: "The history of the negotiations is the story of how the British government were driven step by step under stress of Soviet argument, under pressure from Parliament and the press and public opinion polls, under advice from the Ambassador in Moscow, and under persuasion from the French, to move towards the Soviet position. One by one they yielded points to the Russians. In the end they gave the Russians the main part of what they asked for. Everything in the essential structure of the draft agreement represented a concession to the Russians".

Strang became of interest to an undercover MI5 agent, Eric Roberts, who was operating under the pretence of working for the Gestapo, with the intention of identifying potential fifth columnists. In 1943, he reported on one of the diplomat's female friends who was possibly his lover. Unaware of her connections, Strang had told her "that he personally hated the Jews and regarded the Bolsheviks and the Jews as the two greatest enemies of all that is decent". Roberts reported further comments made six days later to the same woman: "Strang alleged that the Bethnal Green tube disaster was caused by a Jewish pickpocket gang, the ringleader of which netted £200". Ultimate responsibility for the Bethnal Green tube disaster in March 1943 was placed on the negligence of the authorities rather than any individuals.

Strang was present at the major conferences between the Allied leaders during the Second World War. In 1943 Strang was appointed the British representative on the European Advisory Commission, with the rank of ambassador. The commission was established by the Allies to study the possible post-war political problems in Europe and make recommendation but was dissolved at the Potsdam Conference. In June 1945, Strang became political adviser to the Commander-in-Chief of British forces in Germany, Bernard Montgomery.

Strang again returned to the Foreign Office in 1947 and served as Permanent Under-Secretary of State for the German section from 1947 to 1949 and as Permanent Under-Secretary of State for Foreign Affairs from 1949 to 1953. The six years Strang served as Permanent Under-Secretary of State saw the gradual recovery of Europe through the Marshall Plan, the establishment of the Western European Union and NATO and the breaking of the Berlin Blockade. He was retired from the Foreign Office in December 1953.

== Honours ==
While serving as an army captain, Strang was appointed a Member of the Order of the British Empire (MBE) in 1918. was made a Companion of the Order of St Michael and St George (CMG) in 1932, a Companion of the Order of the Bath (CB) in 1939, a KCMG in 1943, a GCMG in 1950 and a KCB in 1953. In 1954, he was raised to the peerage as Baron Strang, of Stonesfield in the County of Oxford. He later served as a Deputy Speaker and Deputy Chairman of Committees in the House of Lords and as Convenor of the Crossbench Peers. He was also Chairman of the Royal Institute of International Affairs and of the college committee of University College, London. He published The Foreign Office (1955), Britain in World Affairs (1961) and The Diplomatic Career (1962) as well as his autobiography Home and Abroad (1956).

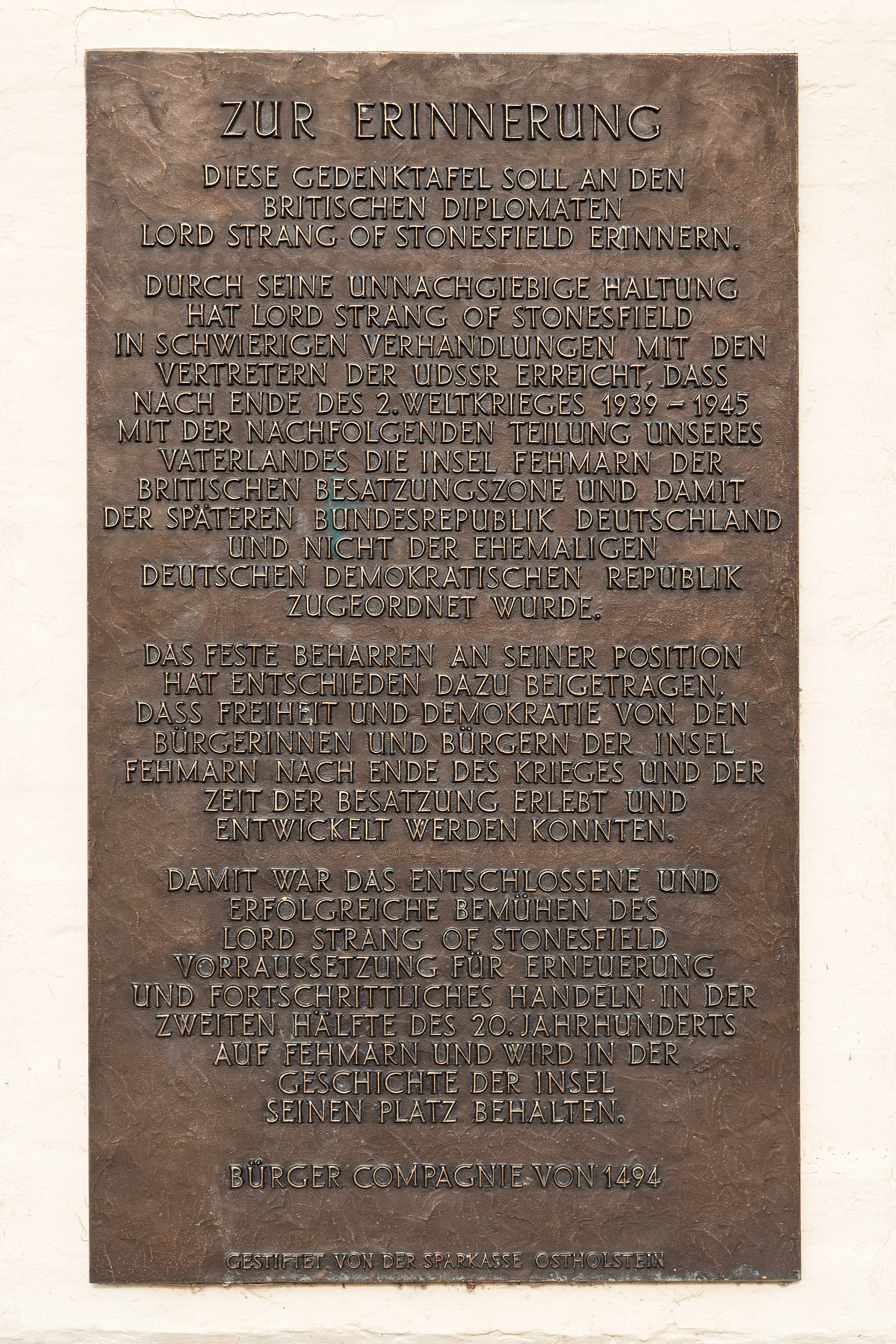
Memorial plaque in Burg auf Fehmarn

Because of standing up for Baltic Sea island of Fehmarn (in the meetings of the European Advisory Committee held in London) so that it did not become part of the Soviet occupation zone, as was Stalin's wish, William Strang is highly revered on the island, although he never visited it during his lifetime.

== Marriage and issue ==
In 1920, he married Elsie Wynne Jones, daughter of Josias E. Jones. They had one daughter and one son:

- Colin (12 June 1922 – 19 December 2014), who succeeded him in the barony.
- Jean (17 April 1921 – 21 October 1988)

Lord Strang died at the age of 85.

== Books and articles ==
- Roberts, Geoffrey (2011). "Stalin and the Outbreak of the Second World War". In Frank McDonough (ed.). The Origins of the Second World War An International Perspective. London: Continuum. pp. 409–428.

Parliament of the United Kingdom
Preceded by Office established	Convenor of the Crossbench Peers; 1968–1974	Succeeded by The Baroness Hylton-Foster
Peerage of the United Kingdom
New creation	Baron Strang; 1954–1978	Succeeded by Colin Strang
