= Ray C. Strang =

American Western artist and illustrator

Ray C. Strang (1893 in Sandoval, Illinois, United States – 1957) was an American Western artist and illustrator. He was educated in Centralia, Illinois, and attended the Art Institute of Chicago, Art Students League of New York and New York School of Fine and Applied Arts. Strang's education was interrupted by The Great War, in which he was wounded in the Forest of Argonne. During World War II, he took part in the Consair art colony at the Tucson division of the Consolidated Aircraft corporation.

For 17 years Strang was a successful illustrator in New York for such magazines as The Saturday Evening Post, The American Magazine, Ladies' Home Journal, Country Home Country Gentleman and Harper's. He created covers for Dodd, Mead and Company and other publishers. He then went West to become a well-known painter who specialized in nostalgic depictions of the Wild West and the prairie life. His paintings hung in many galleries, including Grand Central palace in New York, Bender Gallery in Kansas City, Alden Gallery in St. Louis, the Chicago Art Institute and the New York Art Center. His most famous painting was a work called "Slow Poke", of which there were many reproductions printed.

Strang was an active member of the Fine Arts Association, Palette and Brush club and belonged to the Salmagundi Club of New York City. He had a ranch near Safford Peak in the Picture Rocks section of the Tucson Mountains, where he died in 1957. Ray Strang did many paintings including "Playmates" which is a canvas painting of two foals.

He married and had a son.
