= Colin Strang (footballer) =

Australian rules footballer

Personal information
- Full name: Henry Colin Strang
- Born: 10 August 1910; Sydney, New South Wales
- Died: 22 November 1946 (aged 36); Albury, New South Wales
- Original team: East Albury (O&MFL)
- Height: 184 cm (6 ft 0 in)

Playing career^{1}
Years	Club	Games (Goals)
1933	St Kilda	2 (3)
- ^{1} Playing statistics correct to the end of 1933.

Henry Colin Strang (10 August 1910 – 22 November 1946) was an Australian rules footballer who played with St Kilda in the Victorian Football League (VFL).

Strang, the son of former South Melbourne player Bill Strang, was born in Sydney, but grew up in Albury. He played his early football for East Albury and in 1933 trained with Richmond, where his brothers Doug and Gordon were premiership players. A younger brother, Allan Strang played for South Melbourne. However it was with St Kilda that he made his two league appearances, in the 1933 VFL season. He kicked three goals from full-forward on debut, against Carlton at Junction Oval, in round seven. The following round he played in St Kilda's loss to Collingwood at Victoria Park, then lost his place in the team when Bill Mohr returned from injury.

He returned home in 1935 and began playing for Albury, which was followed by a stint with Kyneton in the Bendigo Football League. In 1937 he joined Northern Tasmanian Football Association side North Launceston, a club captain-coached by his brother Gordon. They lost the grand final that year to Launceston, after which Strang returned to Albury.

On 22 November 1946, Strang died from an illness, aged 36.

Two of his nephews were in Richmond's 1967 premiership team: Geoff Strang, the son of his brother, Doug, and John Perry, the son of his sister, Edna "Bob" Perry, née Strang.
