= Alick Davison =

Australian rules footballer (1886–1945)

Personal information
- Full name: Alexander Ambrose Davison
- Born: 12 October 1886; Carlton, Victoria
- Died: 26 August 1945 (aged 58); St Kilda, Victoria

Playing career^{1}
Years	Club	Games (Goals)
1910	Richmond	8 (1)
- ^{1} Playing statistics correct to the end of 1910.

Alexander Ambrose Davison (12 October 1886 – 26 August 1945) was an Australian rules footballer who played for the Richmond Football Club in the Victorian Football League (VFL).
