= List of VFL debuts in 1933 =

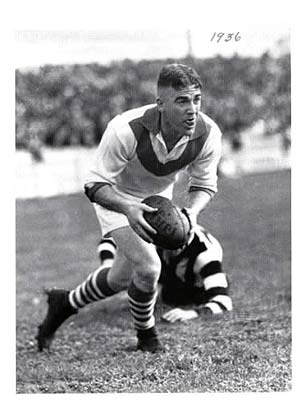
Laurie Nash made his VFL debut in 1933

The 1933 Victorian Football League (VFL) season was the 37th season of the VFL. The season saw 125 Australian rules footballers make their senior VFL debut and a further 37 players transfer to new clubs having previously played in the VFL.

== Summary ==
Summary of debuts in 1933
Club	VFL debuts	Change of club
Carlton	5	3
Collingwood	17	1
Essendon	14	2
Fitzroy	6	9
Footscray	12	4
Geelong	9	1
Hawthorn	14	4
Melbourne	10	3
North Melbourne	14	1
Richmond	4	0
South Melbourne	8	1
St Kilda	12	8
Total	125	37

== Debuts by clubs ==
Name	Club	Age at debut	Round debuted	Games	Goals	Notes
Bob Green	Carlton	22 years, 135 days	4	187	58	Brother of Jack Green.
Jack Hale	Carlton	20 years, 131 days	3	123	78	
Jack Cooper	Carlton	21 years, 297 days	6	15	31	
Les Hughson	Carlton	25 years, 257 days	5	12	7	Previously played for Collingwood and Hawthorn. In all, played for five different clubs. Brother of Fred and Mick Hughson.
Rod Leffanue	Carlton	20 years, 158 days	7	9	20	Previously played for South Melbourne.
Ray Quinn	Carlton	19 years, 224 days	15	4	1	
Steve Bloomer	Carlton	23 years, 253 days	15	3	0	Previously played for North Melbourne.
Ray Harry	Carlton	24 years, 15 days	17	1	0	
Alby Pannam	Collingwood	19 years, 094 days	13	181	453	Son of Charlie Pannam.
Marcus Whelan	Collingwood	18 years, 327 days	4	173	31	Father of Shane Whelan.
Jack Carmody	Collingwood	21 years, 340 days	3	94	12	
Leo Morgan	Collingwood	20 years, 87 days	14	82	7	
Keith Fraser	Collingwood	20 years, 26 days	3	62	9	
Norm Le Brun	Collingwood	25 years, 21 days	3	19	23	Previously played for South Melbourne and Essendon.
Reg Gibson	Collingwood	20 years, 168 days	5	16	6	
Bernie Guthrie	Collingwood	21 years, 219 days	1	7	5	
Lou Daily	Collingwood	21 years, 125 days	6	7	7	Won 1935 Sandover Medal.
John Galbally	Collingwood	23 years, 3 days	15	7	0	Served as a Minister in the Victorian Government. Brother of Frank Galbally,
Ivan McIntosh	Collingwood	19 years, 136 days	1	6	0	
Alfred Andrew-Street	Collingwood	19 years, 28 days	2	6	0	Played first-class cricket for Victoria.
Keith Kent	Collingwood	20 years, 188 days	3	5	0	
Frank Slade	Collingwood	17 years, 304 days	1	2	0	
Max Turner	Collingwood	21 years, 272 days	11	2	0	
Noel Burrows	Collingwood	22 years, 33 days	1	1	0	
Albert Downs	Collingwood	27 years, 215 days	1	1	0	
George Bates	Collingwood	19 years, 163 days	8	1	0	
Dick Reynolds	Essendon	17 years, 331 days	1	314	67	Three time Brownlow Medal winner (1934, 1937, 1938). Brother of Tom Reynolds and grandfather of Joel Reynolds.
Hugh Torney	Essendon	19 years, 252 days	4	173	81	
George Bell	Essendon	21 years, 41 days	8	120	4	
Les Griggs	Essendon	19 years, 28 days	6	99	52	
Ted Rippon	Essendon	19 years, 84 days	13	69	12	
Wally Milne	Essendon	22 years, 228 days	14	22	11	
Walt Wollermann	Essendon	25 years, 10 days	10	9	2	
Clive McCorkell	Essendon	22 years, 351 days	2	7	1	
Alby Jacobsen	Essendon	30 years, 273 days	7	7	0	Previously played for South Melbourne.
Bill Ewing	Essendon	24 years, 20 days	8	5	3	
Frank Hunting	Essendon	23 years, 87 days	6	4	0	
Stan Lawler	Essendon	23 years, 189 days	6	3	9	Previously played for South Melbourne.
Reg Twite	Essendon	22 years, 0 days	1	2	0	
Harold Dickinson	Essendon	24 years, 220 days	9	2	2	
Norm McCleary	Essendon	22 years, 22 days	15	2	3	
Jimmy Bates	Essendon	22 years, 315 days	2	1	0	At the time of his death on 6 October 2009, Bates was the oldest living VFL/AFL player.
Dan Murray	Fitzroy	20 years, 131 days	1	66	4	Father of Kevin Murray
Alf Callick	Fitzroy	24 years, 217 days	1	37	6	Previously played for South Melbourne.
Frank Donnellan	Fitzroy	25 years, 163 days	1	36	0	Previously played for Hawthorn and North Melbourne.
Leslie Watt	Fitzroy	20 years, 169 days	5	35	19	Previously played for Collingwood.
Jock Cordner	Fitzroy	22 years, 324 days	1	24	23	Previously played for Footscray.
Clete Turner	Fitzroy	24 years, 55 days	8	15	3	Previously played for Geelong.
Frank O'Rourke	Fitzroy	27 years, 98 days	1	7	2	Previously played for Carlton.
Seff Parry	Fitzroy	25 years, 255 days	1	5	3	
Arthur Williams	Fitzroy	31 years, 55 days	8	3	0	Previously played for Footscray.
Wally Mitchell	Fitzroy	24 years, 343 days	5	2	0	
Keith Marshall	Fitzroy	26 years, 42 days	6	2	5	
Bruce Scharp	Fitzroy	28 years, 31 days	9	2	0	Previously played for Carlton and Hawthorn.
Keith Giffen	Fitzroy	21 years, 316 days	14	2	0	
Claude Canaway	Fitzroy	21 years, 183 days	16	1	0	
Jack Kidd	Fitzroy	25 years, 167 days	15	1	2	Previously played for Essendon and Carlton.
Ambrose Palmer	Footscray	22 years, 202 days	2	83	44	Australian heavyweight boxing champion.
Bill Grundy	Footscray	21 years, 195 days	6	28	4	
Jack Vosti	Footscray	30 years, 18 days	3	26	0	Previously played for Essendon.
Wally Kelly	Footscray	19 years, 102 days	1	22	3	
Bob Muir	Footscray	26 years, 44 days	4	22	1	Previously played for Collingwood.
Alan Rait	Footscray	24 years, 171 days	1	19	62	
Charlie O'Leary	Footscray	22 years, 51 days	3	16	0	
Frank Spilling	Footscray	20 years, 272 days	13	14	0	
Jack Somerville	Footscray	21 years, 258 days	1	10	1	
Norm Honey	Footscray	19 years, 163 days	11	10	4	
Milton McIntyre	Footscray	23 years, 209 days	4	14	11	
Reg Thomas	Footscray	23 years, 360 days	10	9	10	Previously played for South Melbourne.
Peter Hannan	Footscray	24 years, 200 days	2	6	0	Previously played for Melbourne.
Bill Findlay	Footscray	19 years, 196 days	3	5	8	
Mick Higgins	Footscray	21 years, 300 days	6	2	0	
Charlie Richards	Footscray	22 years, 347 days	14	2	0	
Tom Arklay	Geelong	19 years, 97 days	10	137	45	
Angie Muller	Geelong	20 years, 167 days	1	115	37	
Joe Tucker	Geelong	20 years, 181 days	12	24	17	
Reg Gross	Geelong	23 years, 11 days	9	16	0	
Bob Walker	Geelong	21 years, 86 days	12	14	1	
Eric Orr	Geelong	23 years, 241 days	1	11	2	
Tom Stapleton	Geelong	25 years, 286 days	1	6	0	
Lindsay Lamb	Geelong	19 years, 306 days	17	4	1	
Jim Williamson	Geelong	22 years, 241 days	SF	2	0	Previously played for St Kilda.
Ron Barling	Geelong	20 years, 311 days	15	1	0	
George Dower	Hawthorn	20 years, 53 days	18	100	17	
Ernie Loveless	Hawthorn	25 years, 144 days	1	56	1	Previously played for St Kilda.
Roy Rodda	Hawthorn	22 years, 355 days	1	34	31	
Norm Hillard	Hawthorn	18 years, 91 days	18	32	57	
Alex Lee	Hawthorn	25 years, 36 days	1	31	1	
Steve Bravo	Hawthorn	21 years, 29 days	9	31	12	
Jack Zander	Hawthorn	22 years, 297 days	1	14	3	
Bert Carey	Hawthorn	22 years, 334 days	1	10	16	Previously played for Fitzroy.
Bill Twomey, Sr.	Hawthorn	34 years, 13 days	1	10	0	Father of Mick, Pat and Bill Twomey. Previously played for Collingwood.
Frank Aked, Sr.	Hawthorn	30 years, 155 days	1	8	2	Father of Frank Aked, Jr., grandfather of Arthur and Allan Edwards and great-grandfather of Jake Edwards and Shane O'Bree. Previously played for Footscray.
Leo Clements	Hawthorn	25 years, 242 days	11	7	0	
Fred Sayers	Hawthorn	20 years, 81 days	17	7	4	
Charlie McGillivray	Hawthorn	23 years, 5 days	12	3	0	
Geoff Farrelly	Hawthorn	25 years, 20 days	1	2	1	
Tom Mercer	Hawthorn	22 years, 301 days	8	2	0	
Bruce Scharp	Hawthorn	27 years, 347 days	2	1	0	Previously played for Carlton.
Laurence Cordner	Hawthorn	22 years, 144 days	10	1	1	
Jack White	Hawthorn	21 years, 80 days	18	1	0	
Rowley Fischer	Melbourne	23 years, 64 days	1	137	34	
Les Jones	Melbourne	23 years, 189 days	1	121	88	
Eric Glass	Melbourne	23 years, 66 days	1	78	135	
Colin Niven	Melbourne	29 years, 235 days	1	44	13	Previously played for Fitzroy
Jack Bennett	Melbourne	23 years, 138 days	10	43	28	
Charlie Longhurst	Melbourne	22 years, 49 days	5	40	1	
Billy Libbis	Melbourne	29 years, 322 days	4	39	25	Previously played for Collingwood.
Jack Sambell	Melbourne	24 years, 344 days	1	24	6	
Noel Barnett	Melbourne	24 years, 172 days	3	11	2	
Bill Robinson	Melbourne	24 years, 284 days	8	3	1	
Jack Harrison	Melbourne	24 years, 344 days	18	3	2	
Percy Streeter	Melbourne	21 years, 302 days	5	2	0	
Cliff Tyson	Melbourne	22 years, 272 days	8	2	1	Previously played for North Melbourne.
Charlie Skinner	North Melbourne	20 years, 208 days	14	114	7	
Ted Ellis	North Melbourne	20 years, 141 days	12	85	41	
Jim Bicknell	North Melbourne	22 years, 229 days	1	57	7	
Leo Tyrrell	North Melbourne	18 years, 193 days	11	22	7	
Jack Diprose	North Melbourne	27 years, 227 days	5	19	0	
Trevor Wallace	North Melbourne	21 years, 187 days	14	13	0	
Roy Pope	North Melbourne	18 years, 360 days	7	9	4	
Dick May	North Melbourne	23 years, 102 days	17	9	4	
Len Johnson	North Melbourne	25 years, 2 days	11	5	3	Previously played for Essendon.
Bert Clarke	North Melbourne	27 years, 74 days	13	4	2	
Jack Gaudion	North Melbourne	22 years, 287 days	2	3	0	
Jack Haskett	North Melbourne	21 years, 315 days	2	3	0	
Ted Wintle	North Melbourne	24 years, 144 days	5	1	0	
Jim Bolwell	North Melbourne	21 years, 343 days	15	1	0	
Geoff Fox	North Melbourne	23 years, 94 days	15	1	0	
Jack Stenhouse	Richmond	21 years, 174 days	3	19	0	
Horrie Farmer	Richmond	23 years, 251 days	2	8	14	
Richie Saunders	Richmond	19 years, 355 days	14	8	0	
Bob Gislingham	Richmond	25 years, 114 days	15	1	1	
Ron Fisher	St Kilda	21 years, 286 days	4	82	71	
Ken Mackie	St Kilda	22 years, 181 days	16	62	55	Previously played for Fitzroy.
Frank Roberts	St Kilda	21 years, 68 days	2	27	44	
Stewart Anderson	St Kilda	21 years, 326 days	1	20	21	
Les Jago	St Kilda	25 years, 140 days	1	17	0	
Bill Downie	St Kilda	24 years, 146 days	1	15	2	Previously played for Footscray.
Matt Cave	St Kilda	23 years, 58 days	5	14	3	Previously played for Footscray.
Tom Hallahan	St Kilda	24 years, 211 days	12	14	3	Previously played for Collingwood.
Les Evans	St Kilda	24 years, 160 days	10	12	0	
George Schlitz	St Kilda	23 years, 310 days	8	7	1	
George Chapman	St Kilda	24 years, 88 days	5	4	6	Previously played for Fitzroy.
George Batson	St Kilda	20 years, 247 days	11	4	3	
Col Deane	St Kilda	32 years, 292 days	1	3	0	Previously played for Melbourne.
Jack McLeod	St Kilda	25 years, 246 days	1	2	0	
Ted McCarthy	St Kilda	22 years, 48 days	2	2	0	
Colin Strang	St Kilda	22 years, 304 days	7	2	3	Son of Bill Strang, brother of Allan, Doug and Gordon Strang and uncle of Geoff Strang.
Charlie Bourne	St Kilda	26 years, 273 days	14	2	0	
Eric Needham	St Kilda	19 years, 326 days	1	1	0	
Reg Peterson	St Kilda	25 years, 293 days	6	1	1	Previously played for Essendon.
Bob Hammond	St Kilda	27 years, 310 days	11	1	0	Previously played for Hawthorn.
Laurie Nash	South Melbourne	22 years, 362 days	1	99	246	Played Test cricket for Australia. Son of Robert Nash.
Wilbur Harris	South Melbourne	21 years, 13 days	7	69	19	
Dinny Kelleher	South Melbourne	30 years, 344 days	11	59	14	Previously played for Carlton.
Alan Welch	South Melbourne	22 years, 177 days	1	49	24	
Joe O'Meara	South Melbourne	24 years, 225 days	1	47	36	
Ossie Bertram	South Melbourne	24 years, 12 days	1	23	43	
John Bowe	South Melbourne	21 years, 296 days	2	17	0	
Frank Davies	South Melbourne	24 years, 121 days	6	30	15	
Fred Backway	South Melbourne	19 years, 272 days	10	4	2	
