= 1939 VFL grand final =

Grand final of the 1939 Victorian Football League season

1939 VFL Grand Final

Melbourne	Collingwood
21.22 (148)	14.11 (95)
	1	2	3	4
MEL	3.5 (23)	10.10 (70)	15.14 (104)	21.22 (148)
COLL	6.5 (41)	10.6 (66)	13.9 (87)	14.11 (95)
- Date: 30 September 1939
- Stadium: Melbourne Cricket Ground
- Attendance: 78,110

The 1939 VFL Grand Final was an Australian rules football game contested between the Melbourne Football Club and Collingwood Football Club, held at the Melbourne Cricket Ground in Melbourne on 30 September 1939. It was the 41st annual Grand Final of the Victorian Football League, staged to determine the premiers for the 1939 VFL season.

== The match ==
The match, attended by 78,110 spectators, was won by Melbourne by a margin of 53 points, marking that club's third premiership victory and first since winning the 1926 VFL Grand Final.

== The teams ==
Melbourne	Collingwood

Melbourne
B:	Richie Emselle	Jack Mueller	Rowley Fischer
HB:	Dick Hingston	Gordon Jones	Frank Roberts
C:	Ray Wartman	Allan La Fontaine (c)	Syd Anderson
HF:	Keith Truscott	Ron Baggott	Les Jones
F:	Harold Ball	Norm Smith	Alby Rodda
Foll:	Ron Kimberley	Jack Furniss	Percy Beames
Res:	Jack O'Keefe		
Coach:	Checker Hughes		

Collingwood
B:	Gordon Hocking	Jack Regan	Jack Murphy
HB:	Jack Ross	Alan Williams	Don Balfour
C:	Pat Fricker	Marcus Whelan	Norm Campbell
HF:	Cliff MacRae	Phonse Kyne	Vin Doherty
F:	Jack Knight	Ron Todd	Des Fothergill
Foll:	Albert Collier	Bervyn Woods	Harry Collier (c)
Res:	Jack Green		
Coach:	Jock McHale		

- Umpire(s) – Alan Coward and Bill Blackburn

== Statistics ==
=== Goalkickers ===
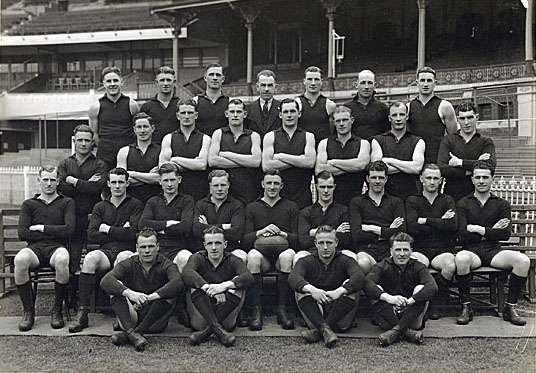
Melbourne FC, premier team

Melbourne:

- P Beames 4
- A Rodda 4
- L Jones 3
- H Ball 2
- J Mueller 2
- K Truscott 2
- R Baggott 1
- A La Fontaine 1
- N Smith 1
- R Wartman 1

Collingwood:

- R Todd 6
- D Fothergill 3
- J Knight 2
- D Balfour 1
- V Doherty 1
- C McCrae 1

== See also ==
- 1939 VFL season
