= Aked =

Aked is a surname. Notable people with the surname include:

- Aleen Aked (1907–2003) Canadian-American painter
- Frank Aked Jr. (1932–1976), Australian rules footballer
- Frank Aked Sr. (1902–1993), Australian rules footballer
- Muriel Aked (1887–1955), English actress
