= 1939 Brownlow Medal =

- Winner: Marcus Whelan (Collingwood); 23 votes

The 1939 Brownlow Medal was the 16th year the award was presented to the player adjudged the fairest and best player during the Victorian Football League (VFL) home and away season. Marcus Whelan of the Collingwood Football Club won the medal by polling twenty-three votes during the 1939 VFL season.

== Leading votegetters ==
	Player	Votes
1st	Marcus Whelan (Collingwood)	23
2nd	Harry Hickey (Footscray)	20
3rd	Dick Reynolds (Essendon)	19
4th	Jack Dyer (Richmond)	17
5th	Wilfred Smallhorn (Fitzroy)	16
=6th	Jock Cordner (North Melbourne)	14
=6th	Syd Dyer (North Melbourne)	14
8th	Herbie Matthews (South Melbourne)	13
9th	Stan Spinks (Hawthorn)	12
=10th	Alby Pannam (Collingwood)	11
=10th	Hugh Torney (Essendon)	11
=10th	Jim Cleary (South Melbourne)	11
	Jack Mueller (Melbourne)*	11

* The player was ineligible to win the medal due to suspension by the VFL Tribunal during the year.
