= Les Hughson Jr. =

Australian rules footballer (1938–2024)

Les Hughson

Personal information
- Full name: Leslie Hughson, Junior
- Born: 1 December 1938
- Died: 4 April 2024 (aged 85)
- Height: 178 cm (5 ft 10 in)
- Weight: 78 kg (172 lb)
- Position: Defender

Playing career^{1}
| Years | Club | Games (Goals) |
| 1958–1962 | Fitzroy | 28 (1) |
- ^{1} Playing statistics correct to the end of 1962.

Les Hughson Jr. (1 December 1938 – 4 April 2024) was an Australian rules footballer who played with Fitzroy in the Victorian Football League (VFL).

== Early life and family ==
Hughson was born on 1 December 1938. His father Les Hughson Sr, who played for a record five VFL clubs including Fitzroy, was at the time coach of Stawell. Two uncles also had significant VFL careers, both for Fitzroy. Most famous was Fred Hughson who captain-coached Fitzroy to the 1944 premiership and the other, Mick Hughson, played 95 games for the club.

== Career ==
Hughson, who wore the number eight, had an injury plagued career at Fitzroy. He played mostly as a defender.

Captain of the Fitzroy thirds in 1957, Hughson came into the senior team for the first time in the 1958 VFL season. He was only able to play a total of 28 games in his five-season career, the most nine appearances in 1960, which included a preliminary final.

A serious knee injury sustained in a game against Collingwood at Victoria Park in 1962 meant he had to undergo a cartilage operation. When he returned to training in 1963 he was forced to retire on medical advice. Fitzroy then appointed him as the club's runner.
