= 1933 Brownlow Medal =

- Winner: Wilfred Smallhorn (Fitzroy); 18 votes

The 1933 Brownlow Medal was the tenth year the award was presented to the player adjudged the fairest and best player during the Victorian Football League (VFL) home and away season. Wilfred Smallhorn of the Fitzroy Football Club won the medal by polling eighteen votes during the 1933 VFL season.

== Leading votegetters ==
	Player	Votes
1st	Wilfred Smallhorn (Fitzroy)	18
2nd	Bill Lowenthal (Essendon)	17
3rd	Jack Davis (St Kilda)	15
=4th	Kevin O'Neill (Richmond)	13
=4th	Norm Ware (Footscray)	13
=4th	Allan Hopkins (Footscray)	13
=7th	Dick Reynolds (Essendon)	12
=7th	Jack Beveridge (Collingwood)	12
=7th	Haydn Bunton Sr. (Fitzroy)	12
10th	Ray Martin (Richmond)	11
