= Cliff MacRae =

Australian rules footballer (1913–2000)

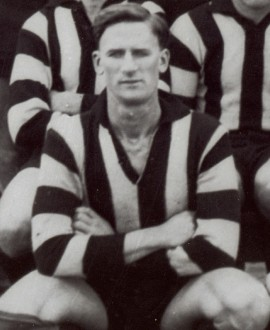
- MacRae in 1939

Personal information
- Full name: Clifton MacRae
- Born: 30 November 1913; Claremont, Western Australia
- Died: 4 April 2000 (aged 86)
- Original team: Werribee
- Height: 180 cm (5 ft 11 in)
- Weight: 75 kg (165 lb)

Playing career^{1}
Years	Club	Games (Goals)
1935–1939	Footscray	58 (62)
1939	Collingwood	3 (7)
Total		61 (69)
- ^{1} Playing statistics correct to the end of 1939.

Clifton MacRae (30 November 1913 – 4 April 2000) was an Australian rules footballer who played with Footscray and Collingwood in the Victorian Football League (VFL).

MacRae, a half forward, was recruited to Footscray from the Werribee Football Club. He kicked five goals for Footscray in their 1938 semi final defeat to Collingwood, a club he crossed over to during the 1939 VFL season, after being dropped from the Footscray team. On his debut for Collingwood, against South Melbourne, he kicked another five goals haul. Two games later he was playing in the 1939 VFL Grand Final, as a half forward flanker. Collingwood lost by 53 points and he would never appear for the club again.
