= Les Evans =

Les Evans may refer to:

- Les Evans (footballer, born 1909) (1909–1975), Australian rules footballer
- Les Evans (footballer, born 1929) (1929–2007), English footballer

== See also ==
- Leslie Evans (born 1958), Scottish government policy adviser
