= Ron Kimberley =

Australian rules footballer, born 1914

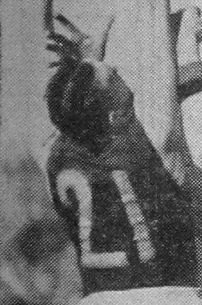

Personal information
- Full name: Ron Kimberley
- Born: 15 July 1914
- Died: 21 July 1981 (aged 67)
- Original team: Sandhurst
- Height: 185 cm (6 ft 1 in)
- Weight: 94 kg (207 lb)

Playing career^{1}
Years	Club	Games (Goals)
1939–1941, 1944	Melbourne	15 (4)
- ^{1} Playing statistics correct to the end of 1944.

Ron Kimberley (15 July 1914 – 21 July 1981) was an Australian rules footballer who played with Melbourne in the Victorian Football League (VFL).

Kimberley, who came to Melbourne from Bendigo club Sandhurst, made 11 of his 15 league appearances in the 1939 VFL season, which included a place in their premiership team. He was a replacement for the suspended Wally Lock in the 1939 VFL Grand Final. Over the next two seasons he only played in the opening rounds. He did not appear at all in 1942 and 1943, then played twice more in 1944.
