= Dower (surname) =

Dower is a surname. Notable people with the surname include:

- Alan Dower (1898–1980), British Army officer and politician
- Dai Dower (1933–2016), Welsh boxer
- Eric Gandar Dower (1894–1987), Scottish politician and businessman
- George Dower (1913–1974), Australian rules footballer
- Jeremy Dower (born 1976), Australian musician and artist
- John Gordon Dower (1900–1947), British civil servant and architect
- John W. Dower (born 1938), American writer and historian
- Natalie Dower (1931–2023), English artist
- Robert Dower (1876–1964), South African cricketer
- Sam Dower (born 1990), American basketball player

== See also ==
- Kenneth Gandar-Dower (1908–1944), English sportsman, aviator, explorer and writer
- Johnny Dowers (born 1971), American actor, writer and musician
