= Bill Lowenthal =

Australian rules footballer, born 1909

Personal information
- Born: 23 September 1909
- Died: 13 July 1989 (aged 79)
- Original team: Ascot Vale Presbyterians
- Height: 173 cm (5 ft 8 in)
- Weight: 70 kg (154 lb)

Playing career^{1}
Years	Club	Games (Goals)
1930–1937	Essendon	73 (14)
1937	Fitzroy	13 (1)
Total		86 (15)
- ^{1} Playing statistics correct to the end of 1937.

William Lowenthal (23 September 1909 – 13 July 1989) was an Australian rules footballer who played with Essendon and Fitzroy in the Victorian Football League (VFL) during the 1930s.

Although a centreman originally, Lowenthal developed into a half back flanker where he was a strong mark overhead and had plenty of dash. It was in that position that he was runner up at the 1933 Brownlow Medal count by just one vote to Wilfred "Chicken" Smallhorn. He was unlucky as he had missed three games late in the season due to an ankle injury. In 1933 Lowenthal also represented Victoria at the Sydney Carnival.

Lowenthal crossed to Fitzroy in 1937 and at the end of the season joined Victorian Football Association (VFA) club Preston. He was with Preston for four seasons and from 1942 to 1946 represented the RAAF team, often as captain.
