= Leo Tyrrell =

Australian rules footballer, born 1914

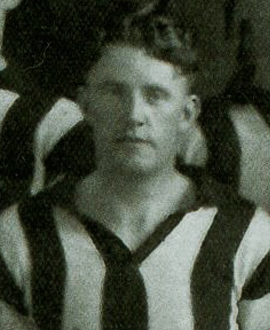
- Tyrrell in 1940

Personal information
- Full name: Leo Thomas Tyrrell
- Born: 2 June 1915; North Melbourne, Victoria
- Died: 12 April 1969 (aged 53); Mentone, Victoria
- Original team: Northern Districts / North Melbourne CYMS (CYMSFA)
- Height: 183 cm (6 ft 0 in)
- Weight: 89 kg (196 lb)

Playing career^{1}
Years	Club	Games (Goals)
1933–39	North Melbourne	22 (7)
1940, 1942	Collingwood	2 (0)
Total		24 (7)
- ^{1} Playing statistics correct to the end of 1942.

Leo Thomas Tyrrell (2 June 1915 – 12 April 1969) was an Australian rules footballer who played with North Melbourne and Collingwood in the Victorian Football League (VFL).

== Family ==
The son of John Harold Tyrrell (1886-1966), and Mary Amelia Tyrrell (1879–1952), née Crump, Leo Thomas Tyrrell was born at North Melbourne, Victoria on 2 June 1915.

He married Lorna Ann Luscombe (1921-1993) on 2 April 1945.

== Football ==
=== North Melbourne (VFL) ===
Granted a clearance to North Melbourne Seconds from North Melbourne Old Boys Football Club in April 1933, and cleared to the North Melbourne Firsts in July 1933, Tyrrell made his debut, replacing Syd Barker (injured knee, previous Saturday), for the North Melbourne First XVIII, against South Melbourne, at the Arden Street Oval, on 8 July 1933:

"North Melbourne has a promising recruit in Tyrrel [sic], a local youngster, who was brought into the side at the last moment.
Strongly built and a determined runner, he did well on the half-forward wing." — Sun News-Pictorial, 10 July 1933.

=== Collingwood (VFL) ===
Tyrrell was cleared from North Melbourne to Collingwood on 5 June 1940, and made his debut for Collingwood against Fitzroy, at Victoria Park, on 29 June 1940.

== Military service ==
He served in the RAAF during the Second World War.

== Death ==
He died at his residence in Mentone, Victoria on 12 April 1969.
