= Lindsay Lamb =

Australian rules footballer

Personal information
- Full name: David Lindsay Lamb
- Born: 24 October 1913; Geelong, Victoria
- Died: 4 May 1994 (aged 80); Geelong, Victoria
- Original team: Barrabool
- Height: 177 cm (5 ft 10 in)
- Weight: 72 kg (159 lb)

Playing career^{1}
Years	Club	Games (Goals)
1933–1935	Geelong	4 (1)
- ^{1} Playing statistics correct to the end of 1935.

Lindsay Lamb (24 October 1913 – 4 May 1994) was an Australian rules footballer who played with Geelong in the Victorian Football League (VFL).

== Career ==
Recruited from Barrabool, Lamb made his league debut in the 17th round of the 1933 VFL season, against Richmond at Corio Oval.

It would be his only senior appearance until the 1935 season, when Lamb played for Geelong while at the centre of a dispute between the club and the Geelong branch of the Waterside Workers' Federation. The branch alleged that Lamb had worked as a volunteer during the meat strikes and as a result declared the Geelong Football Club as "black", for as long as Lamb remained on the club's list. The opening round fixture against Carlton, which Lamb played in, was almost abandoned. Five players reportedly asked for Lamb to be omitted, out of fear of the consequences of having him take the field. This prompted the club president to make an appeal, saying that Lamb would play as he had the support of the committee, and that anyone who pulled out of the game wouldn't play for Geelong again or be cleared to another league club. Lamb also appeared for Geelong in rounds two and three, then lost his place in the side. He was omitted from Geelong's list in 1936, it is unclear whether that was as a result of the pressure put on the club.

Lamb continued his career at Newtown & Chilwell.
