= Jake Edwards (Australian footballer) =

Australian rules footballer (born 1988)

Personal information
- Born: 6 January 1988 (age 38)
- Original team: Melton/Western Jets
- Debut: 20 March 2008, Carlton vs. Richmond, at MCG
- Height: 192 cm (6 ft 4 in)
- Weight: 82kg (180lb)

Playing career^{1}
Years	Club	Games (Goals)
2008	Carlton	5 (4)
- ^{1} Playing statistics correct to the end of 2008.

Jake Edwards (born 6 January 1988) is a former Australian rules footballer who played in five games for the Carlton Football Club in the Australian Football League.

Edwards played TAC Cup football with the Western Jets, and was selected in the 2005 AFL National Draft by the Carlton Football Club with its third round draft pick (#36 overall).

Edwards did not gain senior AFL selection during his first two seasons with the club. He spent 2006 and 2007 playing with Carlton's VFL-affiliate, the Northern Bullants, although these years were also marred by injury. Edwards made his senior debut for Carlton in the opening game of the 2008 AFL season against Richmond, and played five games for the season. Throughout the early part of his career, he played primarily as a leading forward-pocket.

Edwards shifted into a defensive role in the backline in 2009, and played fourteen games with the Bullants, including its grand final loss, but he did not again gain selection to the Carlton team. He was delisted at the end of the 2009 season.

Edwards played for the Darley Football Netball Club in the Ballarat Football League in 2010, alongside brother Jarrod. In 2011, he played for Port Melbourne in the VFL, and was part of the Borough's unbeaten 2011 premiership team; he returned to Darley in 2012, and won the Henderson Medal as the best and fairest player in the Ballarat Football League in 2013. In 2016, he returned to the VFL as a VFL-listed player with the Geelong reserves.

Edwards' father, Allan "Butch" Edwards, played a total of 113 games with Richmond, Collingwood and Footscray in the 1970s and 1980s. His grandfather Arthur Edwards played 120 games for Footscray in the 1950s and his great-grandfather Frank Aked, Sr. played 116 games for Footscray between 1925 and 1932. Shane O'Bree is Jake's cousin with Allan's sister Margaret being Shane's mother.

In 2021 Edwards was a contestant on the reality television show Married at First Sight. and was matched with Beck Zemek and now married to Clare Edwards, formally Rankin.
