= Steve Bloomer (Australian footballer) =

Australian rules footballer (1909–1943)

Personal information
- Full name: Stephen Clarence Bloomer
- Born: 25 November 1909; Yea, Victoria
- Died: 25 July 1943 (aged 33); Flemington, Victoria
- Original team: Brunswick
- Height: 178 cm (5 ft 10 in)
- Weight: 77 kg (170 lb)

Playing career^{1}
Years	Club	Games (Goals)
1931	North Melbourne (VFL)	7 (4)
1933	Carlton (VFL)	3 (0)
1934	Essendon (VFL)	1 (0)
1935-1939	Port Melbourne (VFA)	61 (7)
Total		72 (11)
- ^{1} Playing statistics correct to the end of 1939.

Stephen Clarence Bloomer (25 November 1909 – 25 July 1943) was an Australian rules footballer who played with North Melbourne, Carlton and Essendon in the Victorian Football League (VFL), and with Port Melbourne in the Victorian Football Association (VFA).

== Family ==
The son of Matthias Bloomer (1867-1928), and Catherine Bloomer (-1953), née Downing, Stephen Clarence Bloomer was born at Yea, Victoria on 25 November 1909.

== Football ==
=== Victoria Markets (WL) ===
Bloomer was part of the Victoria Markets team, that had its home ground in Brunswick, which played its first-ever match in the mid-week Wednesday League — "a Melbourne based inter-workplace league" (see "Wednesday League": Boyles Football Photos) on 20 May 1931.

The Victoria Markets team competed for four years: in an eight-team competition in 1931 and 1932, and a seven-team competition in 1933 and 1934. Bloomer played regularly for the Markets team in 1931, 1932, and 1933.

=== North Melbourne (VFL) ===
Promoted from North Melbourne's Second XVIII, he played his first match for the North Melbourne First XVIII, against Collingwood, on 20 June 1931.

=== Carlton (VFL) ===
Cleared from North Melbourne to Carlton on 25 May 1932, and playing for the Carlton Second XVIII on 9 July 1932 against Essendon's Second XVIII, he received a bad knock, going for a mark, and was hospitalized with a ruptured kidney.

Promoted from Carlton's Second XVIII, he played three consecutive matches with the Carlton First XVIII in 1933: the first against Essendon on 5 August 1933, and the third, and last, against Melbourne on 26 August 1933. He continued to play for the Second XVIII until he was cleared to Essendon in June 1934.

=== Essendon (VFL) ===
He was granted a clearance from Carlton to Essendon on 27 June 1934. and immediately became a regular player with the Essendon Second XVIII.

He played one match with the Essendon First XVIII, against Richmond on 1 September 1934. He was back in the Second XVIII the following week.

=== Port Melbourne (VFA) ===
Bloomer was cleared from Essendon to Port Melbourne in the Victorian Football Association (VFA) on 17 April 1935.

He played a total of 61 games, and scored 7 goals, over five seasons (1935-1939). His last match for the Port Melbourne First XVIII was against Willamstown on 29 July 1939. He was dropped to the Second XVIII the following week, and never played senior football again.

== Death ==
He died (suddenly) on 25 July 1943.
