= Bill Findlay (Australian footballer) =

Australian rules footballer and coach

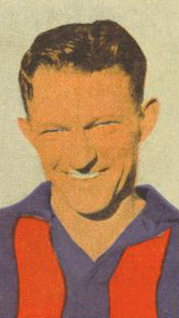

Personal information
- Born: 29 October 1913
- Died: 28 May 1986 (aged 72)
- Original team: Footscray Technical School Old Boys
- Height: 168 cm (5 ft 6 in)
- Weight: 71 kg (157 lb)

Playing career^{1}
Years	Club	Games (Goals)
1933–1934	Footscray	5 (8)
1935–1945	North Melbourne	168 (352)
Total		173 (360)

Coaching career
Years	Club	Games (W–L–D)
1942–1943	North Melbourne	22 (7–14–1)
1961–62, 1964, 1966	Footscray	5 (2–3–0)
Total		27 (9–17–1)
- ^{1} Playing statistics correct to the end of 1945.

Career highlights
- VFL interstate representative; 1946 J. J. Liston Trophy; 3 time North Melbourne leading goalkicker

Bill Findlay (29 October 1913 – 28 May 1986) was an Australian rules footballer who played with Footscray and North Melbourne in the Victorian Football League (VFL). He played as a rover and was sometimes pushed forward where he was a handy goalkicker, averaging two goals a game.

Findlay was started his league career with his local side Footscray and played his first game of VFL in 1933. He managed just the one game in his debut season and four in the next prompting him to move to North Melbourne in 1935.

He took over the captaincy partway through the 1941 VFL season and remained in that position until the end of 1943. His leadership role expanded to captain and coach for the latter part of 1942 and the entire 1943 season. During this time Findlay found himself resting in the forward pocket and was North's leading goal kicker in 1943, 1944 and 1945.

In 1946 he joined Port Melbourne Football Club in the Victorian Football Association (VFA) and started with 88 goals in his first season, including winning the Best and Fairest, and kicking 107 in his next. As captain-coach he led the club to the premiership in 1947. In 1954 Findlay moved to fellow VFA team Coburg Football Club as coach but made a brief return to playing for two matches in 1955, aged 41, during an injury crisis at Coburg.

Findlay was later named as a rover in Port Melbourne's official 'Team of the Century'.

== Sources ==
- Atkinson, G. (1982) Everything you ever wanted to know about Australian rules football but couldn't be bothered asking, The Five Mile Press: Melbourne. ISBN 0 86788 009 0.
