= Allan Edwards (footballer) =

Australian rules footballer

Personal information
- Born: 12 November 1957 (age 68)
- Original team: Robinvale
- Debut: Round 9, 1975, Richmond vs. Carlton, at Princes Park
- Height: 188 cm (6 ft 2 in)
- Weight: 90 kg (198 lb)

Playing career^{1}
| Years | Club | Games (Goals) |
| 1975–1979 | Richmond | 66 (84) |
| 1979–1983 | Collingwood | 35 (45) |
| 1984 | Footscray | 12 (17) |
| Total | | 113 (146) |
- ^{1} Playing statistics correct to the end of 1984.

Allan 'Butch' Edwards (born 12 November 1957) is a former Australian rules footballer who played with Richmond, Collingwood and Footscray in the VFL during the late 1970s and early 1980s.

Edwards, a strong marking centre half-forward, was a regular fixture in the Richmond side for three years after debuting for Richmond midway into the 1975 season. He finished his first year with 31 goals, including four in their Preliminary Final loss against North Melbourne at Waverley. He contested the finals with Richmond again in 1977.

A knee injury suffered in a 1978 training session kept him out of the team for a long period; and, after managing just four games in 1979, he was traded to Collingwood. In his first season at Collingwood, he made it to his maiden VFL Grand Final but ended up on the losing team. He finished his career at Footscray before being forced to retire following an ankle reconstruction.

Many of Edwards's past and future relations were Australian rules footballers. His grandfather Frank Aked, uncle Frank Aked Jr. and father Arthur Edwards all played for Footscray; additionally, his son Jake Edwards played for Carlton, while Shane O'Bree (his nephew) played for Brisbane and Collingwood.
