= Norm Campbell (footballer) =

Australian rules footballer, born 1919

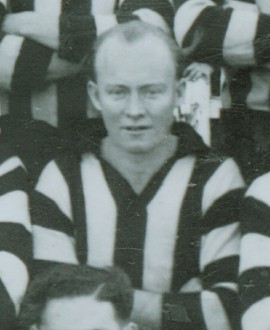
- Campbell in 1942

Personal information
- Full name: Norman Campbell
- Born: 4 March 1919; Thornbury, Victoria
- Died: 9 January 1981 (aged 61)
- Original team: Preston
- Height: 179 cm (5 ft 10 in)
- Weight: 72 kg (159 lb)

Playing career^{1}
Years	Club	Games (Goals)
1939–1946	Collingwood	68 (1)
- ^{1} Playing statistics correct to the end of 1946.

Norman Campbell (4 March 1919 – 9 January 1981) was an Australian rules footballer who played with Collingwood in the Victorian Football League (VFL).

Campbell was a wingman for Collingwood in the 1939 VFL Grand Final, which they lost to Melbourne. His brother Colin played with him at the club in 1940 and 1941.
