= Jack O'Keefe =

Australian rules footballer, born 1915

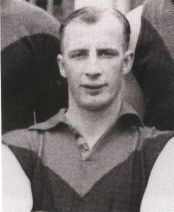

Personal information
- Born: 29 September 1915
- Died: 8 March 2000 (aged 84)
- Original team: Thornbury / Northcote (VFA)
- Height: 193 cm (6 ft 4 in)
- Weight: 87 kg (192 lb)

Playing career^{1}
Years	Club	Games (Goals)
1939–1942	Melbourne	46 (27)
1943–1945	Hawthorn	33 (23)
1947	South Melbourne	3 (6)
Total		82 (56)
- ^{1} Playing statistics correct to the end of 1947.

Jack O'Keefe (29 September 1915 – 8 March 2000) was an Australian rules footballer who played with Melbourne, Hawthorn and South Melbourne in the Victorian Football League (VFL). O'Keefe was a reserve in Melbourne's 1939 Grand Final win in his first season. He was a premiership player again in his next two seasons before moving to Hawthorn in 1943. After 33 games with the Hawks he finished his career with a season at South Melbourne.
