= Les Hughson =

Australian rules footballer, born 1907

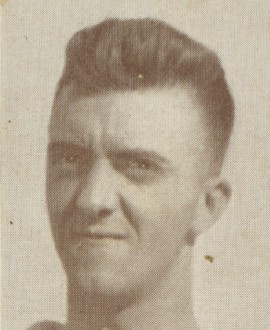
- Hughson in 1927

Personal information
- Full name: Leslie William Mitchell Hughson
- Born: 12 September 1907; Richmond, Victoria
- Died: 22 October 1985 (aged 78); Heidelberg West, Victoria
- Original team: Telegraph FC (Wednesday Mid Week FA)
- Height: 188 cm (6 ft 2 in)
- Weight: 90 kg (198 lb)
- Position: Ruckman

Playing career^{1}
Years	Club	Games (Goals)
1927	Collingwood	1 (1)
1928	Hawthorn	4 (3)
1929	Carlton Reserves	? (?)
1930	Kew	? (?)
1931–33	Preston	35 (33)
1933–34	Carlton	12 (7)
1934–36	St Kilda	41 (45)
1937	Fitzroy	15 (12)
1938-40	Stawell	? (?)
Total		73 (68)
- ^{1} Playing statistics correct to the end of 1937.

Career highlights
- 1939 & 40 Wimmera FL premiership captain-coach: Stawell

Leslie William Mitchell Hughson (12 September 1907 – 22 October 1985) was an Australian rules footballer who played for Collingwood, Hawthorn, Carlton, St Kilda and Fitzroy in the Victorian Football League (VFL).

Hughson is one of only four VFL/AFL footballers to have appeared for five separate clubs. His first port of call was Collingwood but he only played one game for the Magpies, which included a trip to Perth, Western Australia in August, 1927, before switching allegiances to Hawthorn in 1928.

After his season at Hawthorn, the ruckman then played with Carlton Reserves in 1929, then he left the league and played with Kew from 1929 to 1931. Hughson them moved to Preston in the Victorian Football Association in June, 1931.

in 1933, Hughson was involved in a disputed clearance wrangle between the VFL, VFA and Kew, which was finally settled and he was granted a permit to play with Carlton in May, 1933.

He then had a stint at Carlton in 1933 and 1934 before crossing to St Kilda mid season. It was at St Kilda that he played his only full season and he kicked 27 goals for them in 1935.

His fifth and final VFL club was Fitzroy, a club that his brothers Fred and Mick also played for during their careers.

Hughson was captain-coach of Stawell and were runners up in 1938, and again when they won the 1939 and 1940 Wimmera Football League premierships.

Two brothers also had significant VFL careers, both for Fitzroy. Most famous was Fred Hughson who captain-coached Fitzroy to the 1944 premiership and the other, Mick Hughson, played 95 games for the club.

His son, Les Hughson Junior also played senior VFL football with Fitzroy too.

Hughson was enlisted with the Australian Army between 1941 and 1945.

== Links ==
- Les Hughson's playing statistics from AFL Tables
- Les Hughson profile from Blueseum
- Les Hughson profile via Collingwood Forever
- Holmesby, Russell and Main, Jim (2007). The Encyclopedia of AFL Footballers. 7th ed. Melbourne: Bas Publishing.
