= Frank Donnellan =

Australian rules footballer

Personal information
- Full name: James Francis Donnellan
- Born: 17 November 1907; Clifton Hill, Victoria
- Died: 5 July 1994 (aged 86); Victoria, Australia
- Original team: Xavier College
- Height: 184 cm (6 ft 0 in)

Playing career^{1}
Years	Club	Games (Goals)
1926	Hawthorn	3 (2)
1927; 1931–32	North Melbourne	18 (8)
1933–34	Fitzroy	36 (0)
Total		57 (10)
- ^{1} Playing statistics correct to the end of 1934.

James Francis Donnellan (17 November 1907 – 5 July 1994) was an Australian rules footballer who played with Hawthorn, North Melbourne and Fitzroy in the Victorian Football League (VFL).

== Early life ==
The son of James Francis Donnellan and Margaret Ann Fitzgerald, Frank Donnellan was educated at Xavier College in Kew and was a prominent player in their 1924 premiership side.

== Football ==
Donnellan trialled with Essendon in 1925 but joined Hawthorn in 1926, making his debut at full-forward in their 141-point loss to Melbourne and making two other appearances before being dropped to the reserves.

Having been released by Hawthorn at the commencement of the 1927 VFL season, Donnellan played with Thornbury in the CYMS Football Association and then moved to North Melbourne and made a solitary appearance late in the season. During the next few years Donnellan did not play VFL football, again playing with Thornbury, but he resumed with North Melbourne halfway through the 1931 VFL season and made 17 consecutive appearances in the team. During this run of games he changed position from being a key forward to playing at full-back.

At the start of the 1933 VFL season, Donnellan transferred to Fitzroy and he played as full-back in every game for the next two seasons before his retirement.

== Later life ==
In 1935 Frank Donnellan married Jane Elizabeth O’Connell and they lived in Melbourne until his death in 1994. Donnellan is buried at the Andersons Creek Cemetery in Warrandyte.
