= Bob Gislingham =

Australian rules footballer (1908–1982)

Personal information
- Full name: Robert Arthur Gislingham
- Born: 13 April 1908; Richmond, Victoria
- Died: 3 November 1982 (aged 74); Fitzroy, Victoria
- Original team: St Stephen's
- Height: 178 cm (5 ft 10 in)
- Weight: 77 kg (170 lb)

Playing career^{1}
| Years | Club | Games (Goals) |
| 1933 | Richmond | 1 (1) |
- ^{1} Playing statistics correct to the end of 1933.

Robert Arthur Gislingham (13 April 1908 – 3 November 1982) was an Australian rules footballer who played with Richmond in the Victorian Football League (VFL).

== Family ==
The son of George Gislingham (1873–1950), and Elizabeth "Lizzie" Gislingham (1877–1941), née Fisk, Robert Arthur Gislingham was born at Richmond, Victoria on 13 April 1908.

He married Ellen Law Lyon (1913–1990) on 29 June 1929.

== Football ==
=== St Stephen's (MJL) ===
From 1927 to 1930 he played for the Richmond district amateur football church team, St Stephen's, in the Metropolitan Junior League. He won that League's best and fairest award in 1930.

=== Richmond (VFL) ===
Over three seasons (1930 to 1933) he played in 35 games for the Richmond Seconds, scoring 15 goals, winning the team's best and fairest award in 1932. Named several times as an emergency, he played one match for the Richmond First XVIII, against Collingwood, at Victoria Park, on 5 August 1933. Gislingham broke his leg in the 1934 pre-season and did not play for Richmond again.

== Military service ==
=== Second AIF ===
He enlisted in the Second AIF on 25 April 1940.

=== Court-martial ===
In November 1940, both Gislingham and Cornelius Streefkirk (VX13103) were charged with number of offences following a vicious assault they perpetrated, while stationed at Dayr Sunayd in Palestine, upon a sleeping Private William James Hardy (VX10501), in his tent, in the process of attempting to rob Hardy of £30 gambling winnings that he carried around his waist.

Hardy, upon waking, and finding Streefkirk straddling him and groping around his waist for the cash, immediately resisted; upon which Streefkirk began battering him with a tin helmet, and Gislingham began striking him over his head with the heel of a boot (the boot would have had a metal protective heel-plate) that he (Gislingham) held by its toe.

The court found both soldiers guilty of a civil offence. The court's sentence was that, in each case, the soldier was to be discharged from the Defence Force and to be imprisoned with hard labour for two years. Private Gislingham returned to Australia in August 1941, was discharged as S.N.L.R. ("services no longer required"), and was immediately incarcerated, as a civilian, at Pentridge Gaol, where he served out his sentence.
