= Arthur Edwards (footballer, born 1934) =

Australian rules footballer (1934–2006)

Personal information
- Full name: Arthur Reginald Edwards
- Born: 4 June 1934
- Died: 18 May 2006 (aged 71)
- Original team: Sunshine Tech
- Debut: Round 7, 9 June 1951, Footscray vs. South Melbourne, at Lake Oval
- Height: 185 cm (6 ft 1 in)
- Weight: 79.5 kg (175 lb)

Playing career^{1}
Years	Club	Games (Goals)
1951–1960	Footscray	120 (26)
- ^{1} Playing statistics correct to the end of 1960.

Career highlights
- Footscray premiership side, 1954

Arthur Reginald Edwards (4 June 1934 – 18 May 2006) was an Australian rules footballer in the Victorian Football League.

Debuting in 1951 with the Footscray Football Club soon after he turned 17, Edwards stood at 185 cm tall and was a fine ruckman in a period when the club had such tall men as Dave Bryden. Noted for his ruckwork and strong marking skills, Edwards rested in the backline. His career highlight was playing in the Bulldogs' 1954 premiership side.

Four consecutive generations, namely his father in law Frank "Dolly" Aked (Footscray), his son Allan Edwards (Richmond, Collingwood and Footscray) and two grandsons Jake Edwards (Carlton) and Shane O'Bree (Brisbane and Collingwood) have all played at the elite level of AFL/VFL football.
