= Ted Wintle =

Australian rules footballer, born 1909

Personal information
- Full name: Edward Burton George Wintle
- Born: 3 January 1909; Collingwood, Victoria
- Died: 25 February 1972 (aged 63); Heidelberg, Victoria

Playing career^{1}
Years	Club	Games (Goals)
1933	North Melbourne	1 (0)
- ^{1} Playing statistics correct to the end of 1933.

Edward Burton George Wintle (3 January 1909 – 25 February 1972) was an Australian rules footballer who played with North Melbourne in the Victorian Football League (VFL).

== Family ==
The son of Edward Burton Wintle (1876-1966), and Edith Wintle (1889-1942), née Jones, Edward Burton George Wintle was born at Collingwood, Victoria on 3 January 1909.

== Football ==
=== Collingwood (VFL) ===
He played in at least 13 Second XVIII games for Collinwood over two seasons (1930-1931).

=== North Melbourne (VFL) ===
On 28 April 1933 "E.V. Wintle" was granted a clearance from "Collingwood to North Melbourne".

In his one and only match for the North Melbourne First XVIII he played on the half-back flank against St Kilda, at the Junction Oval, on 27 May 1933.

== Military service ==
He served in the Australian Army during World War II.

== Death ==
He died at Heidelberg, Victoria on 25 February 1972.
