= Bill Grundy (footballer) =

Australian rules footballer, born 1911

Personal information
- Full name: William Duncan Grundy
- Born: 22 November 1911
- Died: 19 February 1967 (aged 55)
- Height: 166 cm (5 ft 5 in)
- Weight: 66 kg (146 lb)

Playing career^{1}
Years	Club	Games (Goals)
1933–1934	Footscray	28 (4)
- ^{1} Playing statistics correct to the end of 1934.

William Duncan Grundy (22 November 1911 – 19 February 1967) was an Australian rules footballer who played with Footscray in the Victorian Football League (VFL).

Grundy was used mostly as a rover during his career, which began at West Australian National Football League (WANFL) club East Perth in 1931. He kicked 19 goals for East Perth, from 13 games, before joining Footscray for a two-season VFL stint. In 1933 he made 13 appearances with Footscray and played another 15 games in 1934, spending a lot of his time as a wingman.

Back in Western Australia, Grundy spent a season in the Goldfields National Football League with Mines Rovers in 1937 and appeared in their premiership team.

He returned to the WANFL in 1938 for one final year and spent the season with South Fremantle, playing 17 games.
