= Reg Gibson =

Australian rules footballer (1912–1969)

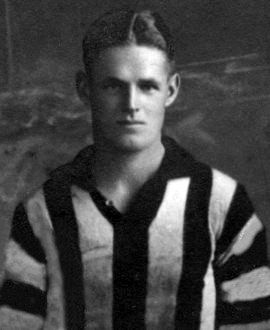
- Gibson in 1935

Personal information
- Full name: Reginald Joseph Gibson
- Born: 10 December 1912; Fairfield, Victoria
- Died: 26 July 1969 (aged 56); Kilsyth, Victoria
- Original team: Kilsyth
- Height: 184 cm (6 ft 0 in)
- Weight: 76 kg (168 lb)

Playing career^{1}
Years	Club	Games (Goals)
1933, 1935–36	Collingwood	16 (6)
1941	South Melbourne	1 (0)
Total		17 (6)
- ^{1} Playing statistics correct to the end of 1941.

Reginald Joseph Gibson (10 December 1912 – 26 July 1969) was an Australian rules footballer who played with Collingwood and South Melbourne in the Victorian Football League (VFL).

After his football career he served in the Royal Australian Navy in World War II.
