= Bruce Scharp =

Australian rules footballer, born 1905

Personal information
- Full name: Bruce Wotherspoon Scharp
- Born: 24 May 1905; Kew, Victoria
- Died: 11 April 1980 (aged 74); Sacramento County, California
- Original team: Kew (MAFA)
- Height: 175 cm (5 ft 9 in)
- Weight: 87 kg (192 lb)

Playing career^{1}
Years	Club	Games (Goals)
1930–31	Carlton (VFL)	7 (1)
1933	Hawthorn (VFL)	1 (0)
1933	Fitzroy (VFL)	2 (0)
Total		10 (1)
- ^{1} Playing statistics correct to the end of 1933.

Bruce Wotherspoon Scharp (24 May 1905 – 11 April 1980) was an Australian rules footballer who played with Carlton, Fitzroy and Hawthorn in the Victorian Football League (VFL).

== Family ==
The son of Louis Bernard Scharp (-1933), and Kate Stewart Scharp, née Wotherspoon, Scharp was born in Kew, Victoria on 24 May 1905.

Scharp came from a family who were well known for their sporting prowess, with his father achieving great success as a bicycle rider including winning the Austral Wheel Race.

Scharp had an elder sister, Blanche Marshall, née Scharp, a younger brother Louis and younger sister Jean Eakins, née Scharp. Scharp also had elder twin half brothers Eric and Ivo Scharp from his father's first marriage to Blanche Scharp, née de la Fontaine.

== Football ==
=== Carlton (VFL) ===
On 30 August 1930, Scharp made his debut for Carlton against the St Kilda Football Club in the Victorian Football League (VFL). He kicked one goal.

=== Hawthorn (VFL) ===
On 27 April 1933, Scharp was cleared from Carlton to the Hawthorn Football Club in the Victorian Football League (VFL).

=== Fitzroy (VFL) ===
On 14 June 1933, Scharp was cleared from Hawthorn to the Fitzroy Football Club in the Victorian Football League (VFL).

=== Sandringham (VFA) ===
On 27 April 1934, Scharp was cleared from Fitzroy to the Sandringham Football Club in the Victorian Football Association (VFA).

=== Yarrawonga (OMFA) ===
On 17 April 1935, Scharp was cleared from Sandringham to the Yarrawonga Football Club in the Ovens & Murray Football Association (OMFA).
