= Frank Slade =

Australian rules footballer

Personal information
- Full name: Frank Harcourt Slade
- Born: 29 June 1915; Bendigo, Victoria
- Died: 13 August 1960 (aged 45); Eastwood, New South Wales
- Original team: Canterbury
- Height: 185 cm (6 ft 1 in)
- Weight: 81 kg (179 lb)

Playing career^{1}
Years	Club	Games (Goals)
1933	Collingwood	2 (0)
- ^{1} Playing statistics correct to the end of 1933.

Frank Harcourt Slade (29 June 1915 – 13 August 1960) was an Australian rules footballer who played with Collingwood in the Victorian Football League (VFL).
