= Charlie Longhurst =

Australian rules footballer, born 1911

Personal information
- Full name: Charlie Longhurst
- Born: 8 April 1911
- Died: 12 February 1970 (aged 58)
- Original team: Golden Point
- Height: 173 cm (5 ft 8 in)
- Weight: 67 kg (148 lb)

Playing career^{1}
Years	Club	Games (Goals)
1933–36	Melbourne	40 (1)
- ^{1} Playing statistics correct to the end of 1936.

Charlie Longhurst (8 April 1911 – 12 February 1970) was an Australian rules footballer who played with Melbourne in the Victorian Football League (VFL).
