= Frank Roberts (Australian footballer) =

Australian rules footballer

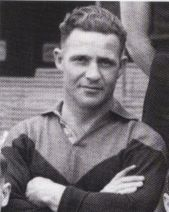

Personal information
- Full name: Frank George Roberts
- Born: 27 February 1912; Long Gully, Victoria
- Died: 26 June 1989 (aged 77); Bendigo, Victoria
- Original team: Sandhurst (Bendigo FL)
- Debut: Round 2, 1933, St Kilda vs. Essendon, at Windy Hill
- Height: 175 cm (5 ft 9 in)
- Weight: 83 kg (183 lb)

Playing career^{1}
Years	Club	Games (Goals)
1933–1934	St Kilda	27 (44)
1936–1941	Melbourne	86 (5)
Total		113 (49)
- ^{1} Playing statistics correct to the end of 1941.

Frank George Roberts (27 February 1912 – 26 June 1989) was an Australian rules footballer who played for St Kilda and Melbourne in the Victorian Football League (VFL).

While at St Kilda Roberts played as a forward, kicking 24 goals in his debut season and another 20 the following year. He spent 1935 playing back home at Sandhurst and in 1936 returned to the league with Melbourne. This time he was used as a defender and was on the half back flank in Melbourne's 1939 premiership team. He played at fullback on Richmond star Jack Titus in the 1940 Grand Final and again finished on the winning side.
