= Richie Emselle =

Australian rules footballer, born 1917

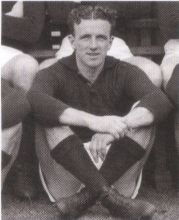

Personal information
- Born: 24 September 1917
- Died: 16 January 1992 (aged 74)
- Height: 175 cm (5 ft 9 in)
- Weight: 76 kg (168 lb)

Playing career^{1}
Years	Club	Games (Goals)
1937–1943	Melbourne	92 (7)
- ^{1} Playing statistics correct to the end of 1943.

Richie Emselle (24 September 1917 – 16 January 1992) was an Australian rules footballer who played with Melbourne in the Victorian Football League (VFL). Emselle was a regular in the back pocket for Melbourne during their golden run from 1939 to 1941.
