= Ossie Bertram =

Australian rules footballer (1909–1983)

Personal information
- Full name: Oswald Milne Bertram
- Born: 17 April 1909; Upper Sturt, South Australia
- Died: 5 May 1983 (aged 74); Mentone, Victoria
- Original team: West Torrens (SANFL)
- Height: 175 cm (5 ft 9 in)
- Weight: 76 kg (168 lb)

Playing career^{1}
Years	Club	Games (Goals)
1933–1934	South Melbourne	23 (43)
1935–1936	St Kilda	15 (17)
Total		38 (60)
- ^{1} Playing statistics correct to the end of 1936.

Oswald Milne Bertram (17 April 1909 – 5 May 1983) was an Australian rules footballer who played with South Melbourne and St Kilda in the VFL during the 1930s.

== Family ==
The son of Frank Ernest Bertram, and Agnes Bertram, née Milne, he was born at Upper Sturt on 17 April 1909. He married Grace Mary Orme (1907-1994) in 1940.

== Football ==
Bertram was a rover and was recruited from South Australian National Football League club West Torrens, where he was a leading player, and had twice represented South Australia at interstate level. He joined South Melbourne for the 1933 season and helped them to win the premiership, kicking 28 goals for the year.

Bertram, who had been unemployed for three years, was one of a number of interstate footballers who joined South Melbourne in the early 1930s, including Jack Wade and Wilbur Harris, also South Australians, with the promise of immediate, long-term, secure, paid employment outside of football within the (137 store) grocery empire of the South Melbourne president, South Melbourne Lord Mayor, and Member of the Victorian Legislative Council, Archie Crofts. The collection of players recruited from interstate became known as South Melbourne's "Foreign Legion".

After playing in a losing Grand Final the following season he moved to St Kilda in 1935, spending two seasons there.

== Military service ==
He enlisted in the Second AIF on 15 July 1940, eventually retiring from the armed services, with the rank of Major in the Royal Australian Army Ordnance Corps, on 18 April 1959.

== Death ==
He died at Mentone, Victoria on 5 May 1983.
