= Reg Peterson =

Australian rules footballer, born 1907

Personal information
- Full name: Reginald Lochiel Peterson
- Born: 16 August 1907; Unley, South Australia
- Died: 23 May 1961 (aged 53); Repatriation General Hospital, Heidelberg, Victoria
- Original team: Carlton reserves
- Height: 182 cm (6 ft 0 in)
- Weight: 75 kg (165 lb)

Playing career^{1}
Years	Club	Games (Goals)
1929–30	Port Melbourne (VFA)	23 (12)
1930	Brunswick (VFA)	6 (5)
1930–31	Brighton (VFA)	15 (45)
1931–32	Essendon	20 (8)
1933	St Kilda	1 (1)
- ^{1} Playing statistics correct to the end of 1933.

Reginald Lochiel Peterson (16 August 1907 – 23 May 1961) was an Australian rules footballer who played with Essendon and St Kilda in the Victorian Football League (VFL).

== Family ==
The son of Henry Christian Peterson (1872-1939), and Jessie Peterson (1877-1943), née MacKenzie, Reginald Lochiel Peterson was born at Unley, South Australia on 16 August 1907.

He married Joyce Esmerald Morris (1916-1979) in 1940.

They had three sons, John (1941), Laurence (1946), and William (1951). John became a major bookseller, Laurence an artist, and Bill a Health and Safety consultant.

== Military service ==
Peterson later served in the Australian Army during World War II. He was captured in the fall of Singapore and remained a prisoner of war in Changi until the end of the war.

== Death ==
He died at the Repatriation General Hospital in Heidelberg, Victoria on 23 May 1961.
