= Aleen Aked =

Canadian-American painter (1907–2003)

- Born: 1907; Kildwick, United Kingdom
- Died: 2003 (aged 95–96); Toronto, Canada
- Known for: Painter

Aleen Aked (1907–2003) was a Canadian-American painter known for her landscapes and portraits.

== Biography ==
Aked was born in Kildwick, England in 1907. Her family emigrated to Canada in 1910. She studied at Ontario College of Art in Toronto with several members of the Group of Seven; Arthur Lismer, Fred Varley, and A. Y. Jackson. After winning a Lismer scholarship, Aked started to attend Ontario College of Art part time at age 14, and she went on to graduate in 1928.

Aked lived in Sarasota, Florida during the winter months from 1929 to 1944. She studied art at the Ringling School of Art. Many of her paintings feature Florida landscapes and Floridians.

Aked was an avid golfer, holding the title of club champion of The Ladies Golf Club of Toronto from 1933–36.

During World War II Aked took a hiatus from exhibiting to turn her energies towards the war effort, sending over 5,000 parcels to the allied troops.

She died in Toronto in 2003.

== Career ==
During her lifetime, Aked exhibited her paintings in North America including at the Royal Canadian Academy and the Sarasota Art Association. Her last exhibition was at the Robert McLaughlin Gallery in 1989.

Aked was a member of several art associations including the Ontario Society of Artists; the Sarasota Art Association (where she was president in 1942 and director in 1946); the Florida Federation of Art and the Southern States Art League.

== Car collector ==
Aked, who started driving at age 11, also maintained a small car collection including: "a 1938 Cadillac, 1955 Chevrolet, 1959 Cadillac with fins, and a 1981 Oldsmobile."
