= Pat Fricker =

Australian rules footballer

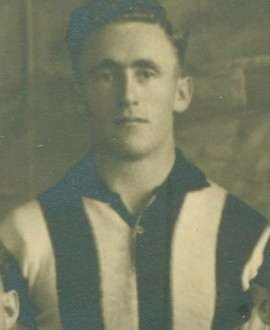
- Fricker in 1935

Personal information
- Full name: Patrick William Fricker
- Born: 9 March 1916
- Died: 24 August 1970 (aged 54)
- Debut: Round 8, 15 June 1935, Collingwood vs. North Melbourne, at Victoria Park

Playing career^{1}
Years	Club	Games (Goals)
1935–1944	Collingwood	71 (18)
- ^{1} Playing statistics correct to the end of 1944.

Career highlights
- Collingwood Captain (1944)

Patrick William Fricker (9 March 1916 – 24 August 1970) was an Australian rules footballer and former captain of the Collingwood Football Club in the Victorian Football League (VFL).

Fricker was named the captain of Collingwood in 1944 after Jack Regan left the club after 1943. Fricker captained Collingwood for only one year as his last game was in round 12 of 1944. Alby Pannam took over the captaincy in 1945. Fricker was the twenty third captain of the Collingwood Football Club and played 71 games at VFL level over a span of nine years. He played in the losing Grand Final of 1938.
