= Percy Streeter =

Australian rules footballer, born 1911

Personal information
- Full name: Percy Streeter
- Born: 29 July 1911
- Died: 19 December 1973 (aged 62)
- Original team: Newport

Playing career^{1}
Years	Club	Games (Goals)
1933	Melbourne	2 (0)
1934	Footscray	5 (3)
Total		7 (3)
- ^{1} Playing statistics correct to the end of 1934.

Percy Streeter (29 July 1911 – 19 December 1973) was a former Australian rules footballer who played with Melbourne and Footscray in the Victorian Football League (VFL).
