= Max Turner (footballer) =

Australian rules footballer, born 1911

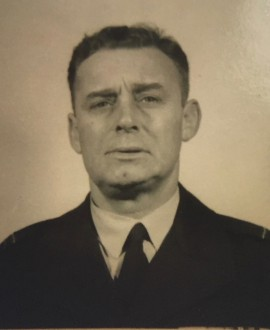
- Turner in the 1930s

Personal information
- Full name: Max Turner
- Born: 9 October 1911
- Died: 24 May 1960 (aged 48)
- Original team: Chelsea
- Height: 182 cm (6 ft 0 in)
- Weight: 78 kg (172 lb)

Playing career^{1}
Years	Club	Games (Goals)
1933	Collingwood	2 (0)
- ^{1} Playing statistics correct to the end of 1933.

Max Turner (9 October 1911 – 24 May 1960) was an Australian rules footballer who played with Collingwood in the Victorian Football League (VFL).
