= Fred Hughson =

Australian rules footballer and coach

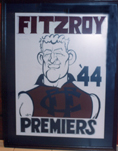

Personal information
- Full name: Fred Hughson
- Born: 22 May 1914
- Died: 23 October 1987 (aged 73)
- Original team: Preston (VFA)
- Height: 183 cm (6 ft 0 in)
- Weight: 85 kg (187 lb)

Playing career^{1}
Years	Club	Games (Goals)
1938–1947	Fitzroy	164 (95)

Representative team honours
Years	Team	Games (Goals)
- Victoria

Coaching career^{3}
Years	Club	Games (W–L–D)
1943–1947	Fitzroy	96 (60–34–2)
- ^{1} Playing statistics correct to the end of 1947.^{3} Coaching statistics correct as of 1947.

Career highlights
- VFL premiership: 1944; Fitzroy captain: 1943–1947; Fitzroy Club Champion: 1943; Fitzroy leading goalkicker: 1938; Fitzroy team of the century

Fred Hughson (22 May 1914 – 23 October 1987) was an Australian rules footballer who played for, captained, and later coached Fitzroy in the Victorian Football League (VFL). He was the last person to lead Fitzroy to the premiership before their merger with the Brisbane Bears, doing so in 1944 as both captain and coach.

He coached Fitzroy for 96 games between 1943 until his retirement in 1947, only two players coached the side more and his 103 games as captain was bettered by only three.

Hughson played as a fullback and was named in that position in Fitzroy's Team of the Century. However, he did play up forward in his debut season in 1938, kicking 62 goals in 15 games topping the club's goalkicking charts. A long kicker of the ball, Hughson established the official and recognised world record for a drop kick at 83 yards 11 inches – at the halftime interval of a VFL game against South Melbourne at the Brunswick Street Oval.

He finished third in the 1941 Brownlow Medal and sixth in 1947; but the highlight of his career was undoubtedly winning the 1944 Grand Final by 15 points over Richmond, as Captain-Coach.

After leaving Fitzroy he went on to play and coach South Warrnambool.

Brother of Fitzroy footballers, Les Hughson and Mick Hughson.

== Career highlights ==
Playing career:

- Fitzroy 1938–1947 (Games 164; Goals 95; Brownlow votes 50)

Player honors:

- 3rd in Brownlow Medal: 1941.
- Fitzroy Best & Fairest: 1943.
- Fitzroy leading goalkicker: 1938.
- Fitzroy captain: 1943 to 1947.
- Fitzroy Team of the Century.
- Victorian representative:
- Last ever Fitzroy premiership captain and coach
