= Bill Robinson (footballer, born 1908) =

Australian rules footballer, born 1908

Personal information
- Full name: William Whitmore Robinson
- Born: 6 September 1908; Korong Vale, Victoria
- Died: 11 July 1968 (aged 59); Northcote, Victoria
- Original team: Natimuk

Playing career^{1}
Years	Club	Games (Goals)
1933	Melbourne	3 (1)
1934–35	Preston (VFA)	28 (4)
- ^{1} Playing statistics correct to the end of 1935.

William Whitmore Robinson (6 September 1908 – 11 July 1968) was an Australian rules footballer who played three games with Melbourne in the Victorian Football League (VFL).

He later played for Preston in the Victorian Football Association.
