= Reg Thomas (Australian footballer) =

Australian rules footballer, born 1909

Personal information
- Full name: George Reginald Thomas
- Born: 6 July 1909; Footscray, Victoria
- Died: 5 December 1966 (aged 57); Richmond, Victoria
- Height: 168 cm (5 ft 6 in)
- Weight: 77 kg (170 lb)

Playing career^{1}
Years	Club	Games (Goals)
1931–32	South Melbourne (VFL)	23 (16)
1933–34	Footscray (VFL)	9 (10)
1938–41	Williamstown (VFA)	63 (119)
Total		95 (145)
- ^{1} Playing statistics correct to the end of 1934.

Career highlights
- 1939 VFA premiership

George Reginald Thomas (6 July 1909 – 5 December 1966) was an Australian rules footballer who played with the South Melbourne Football Club and the Footscray Football Club in the Victorian Football League (VFL) and the Williamstown Football Club in the Victorian Football Association (VFA).

== Family ==
The son of George Griffith Thomas (1875–1942), and Edith Thomas (1875-1945), née Richardson, George Reginald Thomas was born at Footscray, Victoria on 6 July 1909.

He married Eileen Mary Sullivan (b.1911), at Clifton Hill, on 19 December 1936.

== Football ==
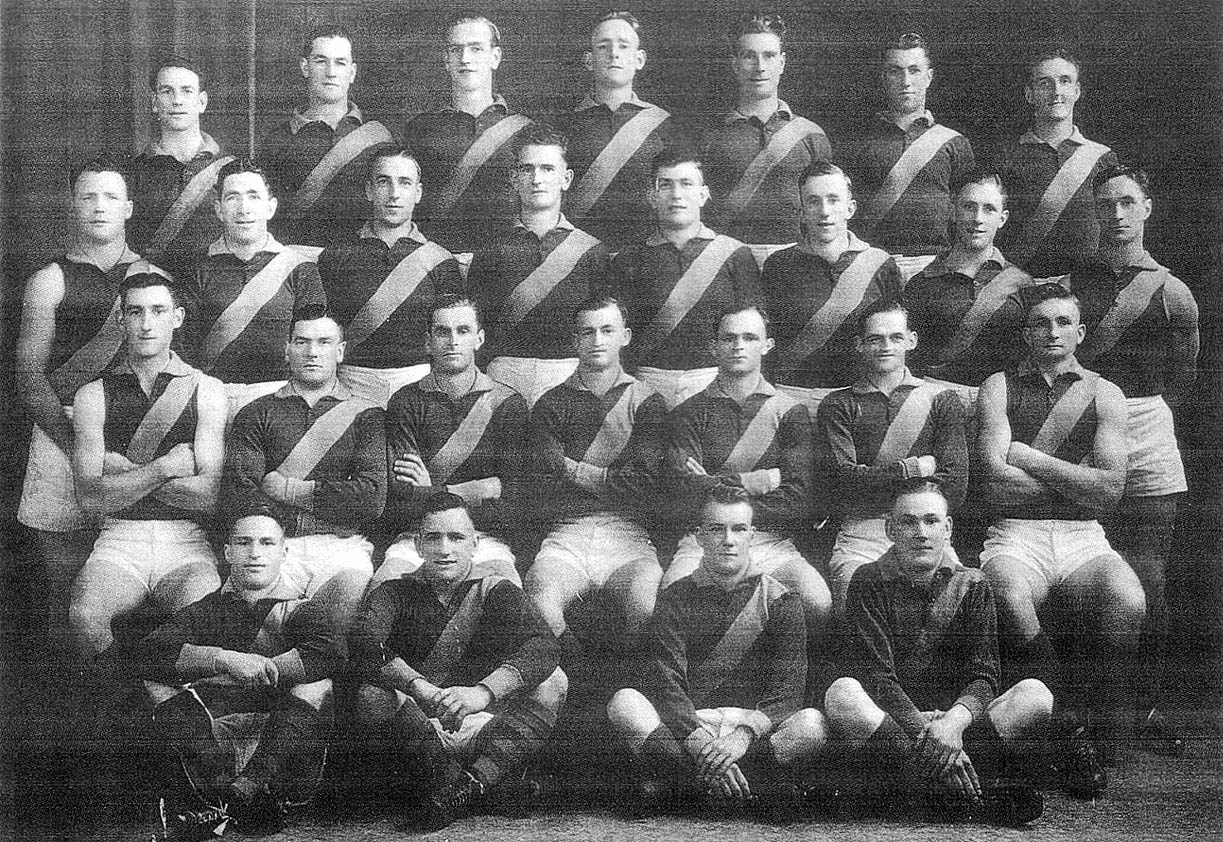
Williamstown premiership team 1939. Thomas is seated, third from right.

=== Williamstown (VFA) ===
Thomas crossed to Williamstown in the VFA in 1938 without a clearance from the Swans where he was captain-coach of the Seconds.

Thomas played in 63 games (119 goals) for Williamstown over four seasons (1938 to 1941). He was vice-captain of its 1939 premiership side. A broken foot and war-related employment restricted Thomas to just 5 games in 1941. He was awarded the most effective player trophy and best attendance at training in 1938, and was the most improved player in 1940.

== Death ==
He died at Richmond, Victoria on 5 December 1966.
