= Milton McIntyre =

Australian rules footballer, born 1909

Personal information
- Full name: Milton Learmonth McIntyre
- Born: 23 October 1909; Learmonth, Victoria
- Died: 26 May 1969 (aged 59); Ballarat, Victoria
- Original team: Learmonth
- Height: 184 cm (6 ft 0 in)
- Position: Centre half forward

Playing career^{1}
Years	Club	Games (Goals)
1933	Footscray	14 (11)
- ^{1} Playing statistics correct to the end of 1933.

Milton Learmonth McIntyre (23 October 1909 – 26 May 1969) was an Australian rules footballer who played with Footscray in the Victorian Football League (VFL).

After playing 14 senior VFL games in 1933, McIntyre initially played with the Footscray Reserves in 1934 before playing out the 1934 season with South Ballarat in the Ballarat Football League and playing in their 1934 premiership side.

In 1938, McIntyre kicked a record 22 goals for South Ballarat in a match against Ballarat CYMS, with the record Ballarat Football League match score at the time being - South Ballarat: 42.26 - 278 d Ballarat CYMS: 2.4 - 16

In the 1938 Ballarat Football League grand final, McIntyre kicked a record 10 goals for South Ballarat in their grand final victory over Sebastopol.
