= Les Evans (footballer, born 1909) =

Australian rules footballer, born 1909

Personal information
- Full name: Les Evans
- Born: 22 January 1909
- Died: 22 December 1975 (aged 66)
- Original team: Port Fairy / Kew

Playing career^{1}
Years	Club	Games (Goals)
1933–34	St Kilda	12 (0)
- ^{1} Playing statistics correct to the end of 1934.

Les Evans (22 January 1909 – 22 December 1975) was an Australian rules footballer who played with St Kilda in the Victorian Football League (VFL).
