= John Bowe (footballer) =

Australian rules footballer (1911–1990)

Personal information
- Full name: John Bowe
- Born: 14 July 1911; Kalgoorlie, Western Australia
- Died: 12 April 1990 (aged 78); Fremantle, Western Australia
- Original team: Subiaco (WANFL)
- Height: 175 cm (5 ft 9 in)
- Weight: 69 kg (152 lb)

Playing career^{1}
| Years | Club | Games (Goals) |
| 1933 | South Melbourne | 17 (0) |
- ^{1} Playing statistics correct to the end of 1933.

John Bowe (14 July 1911 – 12 April 1990) was an Australian rules footballer who played with South Melbourne in the VFL. He played on the wing in the club's 1933 Grand Final win over Richmond.

The collection of players recruited from interstate in 1932/1933 became known as South Melbourne's "Foreign Legion".

Bowe was recruited from Subiaco in the West Australian Football League (WAFL) and returned to the club after playing for South Melbourne in 1933. He won Subiaco's best and fairest award in 1934. He captained Western Australian in a state game in 1936 and was appointed as coach of South Fremantle in 1941.
