= George Dower =

Australian rules footballer, born 1913

Personal information
- Full name: George Dower
- Born: 11 July 1913
- Died: 8 September 1974 (aged 61)
- Original team: South Hawthorn / Kew
- Height: 183 cm (6 ft 0 in)
- Weight: 76 kg (168 lb)
- Position: Centre half-back

Playing career^{1}
Years	Club	Games (Goals)
1933–40	Hawthorn	100 (17)
- ^{1} Playing statistics correct to the end of 1940.

George Dower (11 July 1913 – 8 September 1974) was a former Australian rules footballer who played with Hawthorn in the Victorian Football League (VFL).
