= Rowley Fischer =

Australian rules footballer

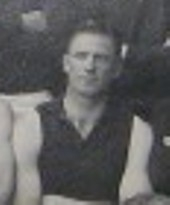

Personal information
- Full name: Roland Frederick Fischer
- Born: 24 February 1910; Adelaide, South Australia
- Died: 12 September 1992 (aged 82)
- Original team: Murtoa
- Height: 185 cm (6 ft 1 in)
- Weight: 91 kg (201 lb)

Playing career^{1}
| Years | Club | Games (Goals) |
| 1933–1941 | Melbourne | 137 (34) |
- ^{1} Playing statistics correct to the end of 1941.

Roland Frederick "Rowley" Fischer (24 February 1910 – 12 September 1992) was an Australian rules footballer who played with Melbourne in the Victorian Football League (VFL).

Fischer was born in Adelaide but recruited from Victorian club Murtoa. He represented the VFL at the 1937 Perth Carnival and again in 1939, for a total of five appearances. Playing in the back pocket, Fischer was a member of Melbourne's 1939 premiership team. He was also used as a ruckman and at centre-half forward during his career. Fischer missed Melbourne's 1940 premiership win after injuring his ankle in the preliminary final and he was also absent from their 1941 premiership team, with injury. He enlisted in the army in 1942 and didn't play again for Melbourne.
