= Frank Davies (footballer, born 1907) =

Australian rules footballer (1907–1993)

Personal information
- Full name: Francis Albert Davies
- Born: 27 November 1907
- Died: 8 February 1993 (aged 85); Lindisfarne, Tasmania
- Original team: City
- Height: 177 cm (5 ft 10 in)
- Weight: 81 kg (179 lb)

Playing career^{1}
Years	Club	Games (Goals)
1933	South Melbourne	7 (3)
- ^{1} Playing statistics correct to the end of 1933.

Francis Albert Davies (27 November 1907 – 8 February 1993) was an Australian rules footballer who played with South Melbourne in the Victorian Football League (VFL).

A centreman, Davies was recruited from City in the Northern Tasmanian Football Association. The collection of players recruited from interstate in 1932/1933 became known as South Melbourne's "Foreign Legion".

He was playing for Launceston in 1941, and was later appointed playing coach of Deloraine in 1948.
