= 1939 VFL season =

43rd season of the Victorian Football League (VFL)

1939 VFL premiership season
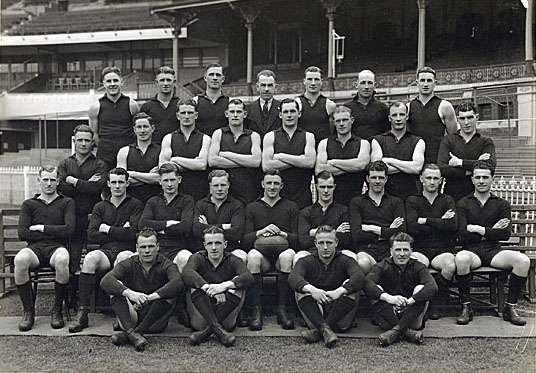
- Melbourne Football Club, premier team
- Teams: 12
- Premiers: Melbourne; 3rd premiership
- Minor premiers: Melbourne; 1st minor premiership
- Brownlow Medallist: Marcus Whelan (Collingwood)
- Ron Todd (Collingwood)
- Matches played: 112
- Highest: 78,110

The 1939 VFL season was the 43rd season of the Victorian Football League (VFL), the highest level senior Australian rules football competition in Victoria. The season featured twelve clubs, ran from 22 April until 30 September, and comprised an 18-game home-and-away season followed by a finals series featuring the top four clubs.

The premiership was won by the Melbourne Football Club for the third time, after it defeated Collingwood by 53 points in the 1939 VFL Grand Final.

== Background ==
In 1939, the VFL competition consisted of twelve teams of 18 on-the-field players each, plus one substitute player, known as the 19th man. A player could be substituted for any reason; however, once substituted, a player could not return to the field of play under any circumstances.

Teams played each other in a home-and-away season of 18 rounds; matches 12 to 18 were the "home-and-way reverse" of matches 1 to 7.

Once the 18 round home-and-away season had finished, the 1939 VFL Premiers were determined by the specific format and conventions of the Page–McIntyre system.

== Home-and-away season ==
=== Round 1 ===
Home team	Home team score	Away team	Away team score	Venue	Crowd	Date
Melbourne	11.18 (84)	Richmond	17.19 (121)	MCG	21,840	22 April 1939
Collingwood	18.14 (122)	Geelong	14.7 (91)	Victoria Park	17,500	22 April 1939
Carlton	20.22 (142)	South Melbourne	13.10 (88)	Princes Park	25,000	22 April 1939
St Kilda	18.20 (128)	Hawthorn	9.13 (67)	Junction Oval	15,500	22 April 1939
North Melbourne	11.9 (75)	Fitzroy	9.12 (66)	Arden Street Oval	14,000	22 April 1939
Footscray	14.18 (102)	Essendon	15.17 (107)	Western Oval	23,000	22 April 1939

=== Round 2 ===
Home team	Home team score	Away team	Away team score	Venue	Crowd	Date
Hawthorn	17.13 (115)	North Melbourne	11.11 (77)	Glenferrie Oval	11,000	29 April 1939
Fitzroy	14.18 (102)	St Kilda	20.14 (134)	Brunswick Street Oval	15,000	29 April 1939
Essendon	19.21 (135)	Melbourne	21.15 (141)	Windy Hill	20,000	29 April 1939
Richmond	20.19 (139)	Footscray	17.8 (110)	Punt Road Oval	26,000	29 April 1939
South Melbourne	15.17 (107)	Collingwood	21.20 (146)	Lake Oval	17,000	29 April 1939
Geelong	14.8 (92)	Carlton	11.13 (79)	Corio Oval	15,000	29 April 1939

=== Round 3 ===
Home team	Home team score	Away team	Away team score	Venue	Crowd	Date
Melbourne	16.16 (112)	St Kilda	10.21 (81)	MCG	25,703	6 May 1939
Essendon	16.8 (104)	Richmond	15.16 (106)	Windy Hill	21,000	6 May 1939
Collingwood	17.11 (113)	Footscray	14.14 (98)	Victoria Park	20,000	6 May 1939
Carlton	17.21 (123)	North Melbourne	16.10 (106)	Princes Park	18,000	6 May 1939
Hawthorn	17.14 (116)	Geelong	8.18 (66)	Glenferrie Oval	12,000	6 May 1939
South Melbourne	9.14 (68)	Fitzroy	10.17 (77)	Lake Oval	15,000	6 May 1939

=== Round 4 ===
Home team	Home team score	Away team	Away team score	Venue	Crowd	Date
Richmond	14.24 (108)	South Melbourne	13.7 (85)	Punt Road Oval	15,000	13 May 1939
Fitzroy	10.17 (77)	Hawthorn	11.11 (77)	Brunswick Street Oval	12,000	13 May 1939
North Melbourne	11.8 (74)	Melbourne	15.20 (110)	Arden Street Oval	10,500	13 May 1939
Geelong	19.15 (129)	Essendon	11.15 (81)	Corio Oval	11,000	13 May 1939
St Kilda	20.11 (131)	Collingwood	13.16 (94)	Junction Oval	28,000	13 May 1939
Footscray	5.12 (42)	Carlton	14.16 (100)	Western Oval	23,000	13 May 1939

=== Round 5 ===
Home team	Home team score	Away team	Away team score	Venue	Crowd	Date
Geelong	12.18 (90)	Melbourne	15.16 (106)	Corio Oval	12,000	20 May 1939
Essendon	14.21 (105)	St Kilda	8.18 (66)	Windy Hill	18,000	20 May 1939
Richmond	16.22 (118)	North Melbourne	13.11 (89)	Punt Road Oval	11,000	20 May 1939
South Melbourne	18.12 (120)	Footscray	16.6 (102)	Lake Oval	14,000	20 May 1939
Fitzroy	11.13 (79)	Collingwood	17.14 (116)	Brunswick Street Oval	15,000	20 May 1939
Hawthorn	13.8 (86)	Carlton	11.17 (83)	Glenferrie Oval	20,000	20 May 1939

=== Round 6 ===
Home team	Home team score	Away team	Away team score	Venue	Crowd	Date
Melbourne	19.23 (137)	South Melbourne	3.12 (30)	MCG	16,523	27 May 1939
Collingwood	14.14 (98)	Hawthorn	12.7 (79)	Victoria Park	15,000	27 May 1939
Carlton	8.13 (61)	Richmond	9.14 (68)	Princes Park	34,000	27 May 1939
St Kilda	16.18 (114)	Geelong	10.16 (76)	Junction Oval	17,000	27 May 1939
Footscray	11.13 (79)	Fitzroy	15.10 (100)	Western Oval	13,000	27 May 1939
North Melbourne	15.11 (101)	Essendon	13.10 (88)	Arden Street Oval	14,500	27 May 1939

=== Round 7 ===
Home team	Home team score	Away team	Away team score	Venue	Crowd	Date
Geelong	17.13 (115)	North Melbourne	14.13 (97)	Corio Oval	8,000	3 June 1939
Fitzroy	14.15 (99)	Melbourne	18.14 (122)	Brunswick Street Oval	11,000	3 June 1939
South Melbourne	8.14 (62)	St Kilda	13.17 (95)	Lake Oval	15,000	3 June 1939
Hawthorn	12.15 (87)	Footscray	7.23 (65)	Glenferrie Oval	12,500	3 June 1939
Richmond	6.17 (53)	Collingwood	12.17 (89)	Punt Road Oval	40,000	3 June 1939
Essendon	10.12 (72)	Carlton	10.18 (78)	Windy Hill	20,000	3 June 1939

=== Round 8 ===
Home team	Home team score	Away team	Away team score	Venue	Crowd	Date
Hawthorn	7.13 (55)	Richmond	12.21 (93)	Glenferrie Oval	21,000	10 June 1939
St Kilda	18.12 (120)	North Melbourne	16.10 (106)	Junction Oval	17,000	10 June 1939
Collingwood	18.15 (123)	Carlton	12.12 (84)	Victoria Park	36,000	10 June 1939
Essendon	9.16 (70)	South Melbourne	13.13 (91)	Windy Hill	18,000	12 June 1939
Melbourne	18.14 (122)	Footscray	15.13 (103)	MCG	22,016	12 June 1939
Geelong	21.17 (143)	Fitzroy	14.12 (96)	Corio Oval	9,000	12 June 1939

=== Round 9 ===
Home team	Home team score	Away team	Away team score	Venue	Crowd	Date
Footscray	12.14 (86)	St Kilda	19.16 (130)	Western Oval	13,500	17 June 1939
Carlton	19.19 (133)	Melbourne	15.13 (103)	Princes Park	20,000	17 June 1939
South Melbourne	15.18 (108)	Hawthorn	12.14 (86)	Lake Oval	9,000	17 June 1939
Richmond	12.22 (94)	Geelong	9.15 (69)	Punt Road Oval	17,000	17 June 1939
Fitzroy	11.15 (81)	Essendon	13.12 (90)	Brunswick Street Oval	10,000	17 June 1939
North Melbourne	10.18 (78)	Collingwood	14.21 (105)	Arden Street Oval	14,000	17 June 1939

=== Round 10 ===
Home team	Home team score	Away team	Away team score	Venue	Crowd	Date
Geelong	16.15 (111)	South Melbourne	7.14 (56)	Corio Oval	6,500	24 June 1939
Fitzroy	17.13 (115)	Richmond	10.13 (73)	Brunswick Street Oval	11,000	24 June 1939
Essendon	19.11 (125)	Hawthorn	16.19 (115)	Windy Hill	11,000	24 June 1939
North Melbourne	15.12 (102)	Footscray	11.10 (76)	Arden Street Oval	11,000	24 June 1939
Melbourne	22.22 (154)	Collingwood	8.12 (60)	MCG	26,063	24 June 1939
St Kilda	14.14 (98)	Carlton	9.16 (70)	Junction Oval	28,000	24 June 1939

=== Round 11 ===
Home team	Home team score	Away team	Away team score	Venue	Crowd	Date
Richmond	7.9 (51)	St Kilda	9.12 (66)	Punt Road Oval	17,000	1 July 1939
Hawthorn	8.4 (52)	Melbourne	7.12 (54)	Glenferrie Oval	8,000	1 July 1939
Footscray	5.10 (40)	Geelong	3.7 (25)	Western Oval	6,000	1 July 1939
Collingwood	18.9 (117)	Essendon	7.18 (60)	Victoria Park	10,500	1 July 1939
Carlton	15.13 (103)	Fitzroy	7.18 (60)	Princes Park	11,000	1 July 1939
South Melbourne	7.6 (48)	North Melbourne	14.12 (96)	Lake Oval	6,000	1 July 1939

=== Round 12 ===
Home team	Home team score	Away team	Away team score	Venue	Crowd	Date
Hawthorn	11.18 (84)	St Kilda	15.17 (107)	Glenferrie Oval	18,000	8 July 1939
Fitzroy	10.20 (80)	North Melbourne	9.16 (70)	Brunswick Street Oval	12,000	8 July 1939
Essendon	17.20 (122)	Footscray	18.15 (123)	Windy Hill	13,000	8 July 1939
Richmond	13.21 (99)	Melbourne	15.16 (106)	Punt Road Oval	22,000	8 July 1939
Geelong	18.12 (120)	Collingwood	16.13 (109)	Corio Oval	10,500	8 July 1939
South Melbourne	12.16 (88)	Carlton	16.17 (113)	Lake Oval	14,000	8 July 1939

=== Round 13 ===
Home team	Home team score	Away team	Away team score	Venue	Crowd	Date
Footscray	7.7 (49)	Richmond	13.25 (103)	Western Oval	15,000	15 July 1939
Collingwood	19.11 (125)	South Melbourne	8.13 (61)	Victoria Park	10,500	15 July 1939
Carlton	14.14 (98)	Geelong	12.5 (77)	Princes Park	19,000	15 July 1939
North Melbourne	18.11 (119)	Hawthorn	11.16 (82)	Arden Street Oval	8,000	15 July 1939
St Kilda	16.19 (115)	Fitzroy	13.6 (84)	Junction Oval	16,500	15 July 1939
Melbourne	7.18 (60)	Essendon	10.17 (77)	MCG	16,247	15 July 1939

=== Round 14 ===
Home team	Home team score	Away team	Away team score	Venue	Crowd	Date
Geelong	15.22 (112)	Hawthorn	13.12 (90)	Corio Oval	5,000	22 July 1939
Fitzroy	15.19 (109)	South Melbourne	9.9 (63)	Brunswick Street Oval	10,000	22 July 1939
St Kilda	10.18 (78)	Melbourne	15.12 (102)	Junction Oval	28,000	22 July 1939
Richmond	18.14 (122)	Essendon	10.8 (68)	Punt Road Oval	17,000	22 July 1939
Footscray	9.14 (68)	Collingwood	13.7 (85)	Western Oval	11,000	22 July 1939
North Melbourne	10.13 (73)	Carlton	11.13 (79)	Arden Street Oval	16,500	22 July 1939

=== Round 15 ===
Home team	Home team score	Away team	Away team score	Venue	Crowd	Date
Melbourne	14.18 (102)	North Melbourne	9.6 (60)	MCG	12,882	5 August 1939
Essendon	15.17 (107)	Geelong	6.11 (47)	Windy Hill	8,000	5 August 1939
Collingwood	18.8 (116)	St Kilda	13.11 (89)	Victoria Park	19,000	5 August 1939
Carlton	24.15 (159)	Footscray	9.17 (71)	Princes Park	12,000	5 August 1939
South Melbourne	12.6 (78)	Richmond	18.15 (123)	Lake Oval	10,000	5 August 1939
Hawthorn	10.20 (80)	Fitzroy	12.7 (79)	Glenferrie Oval	6,000	5 August 1939

=== Round 16 ===
Home team	Home team score	Away team	Away team score	Venue	Crowd	Date
North Melbourne	15.11 (101)	Richmond	18.8 (116)	Arden Street Oval	14,000	12 August 1939
Footscray	19.15 (129)	South Melbourne	12.10 (82)	Western Oval	7,500	12 August 1939
Collingwood	16.8 (104)	Fitzroy	10.13 (73)	Victoria Park	14,000	12 August 1939
Carlton	18.16 (124)	Hawthorn	7.20 (62)	Princes Park	11,000	12 August 1939
Melbourne	22.16 (148)	Geelong	13.17 (95)	MCG	9,413	12 August 1939
St Kilda	13.13 (91)	Essendon	18.14 (122)	Junction Oval	17,000	12 August 1939

=== Round 17 ===
Home team	Home team score	Away team	Away team score	Venue	Crowd	Date
Geelong	7.17 (59)	St Kilda	12.12 (84)	Corio Oval	6,500	19 August 1939
Fitzroy	10.10 (70)	Footscray	10.8 (68)	Brunswick Street Oval	9,000	19 August 1939
Essendon	14.17 (101)	North Melbourne	9.7 (61)	Windy Hill	10,000	19 August 1939
South Melbourne	11.14 (80)	Melbourne	12.12 (84)	Lake Oval	5,000	19 August 1939
Hawthorn	6.15 (51)	Collingwood	7.17 (59)	Glenferrie Oval	7,500	19 August 1939
Richmond	13.10 (88)	Carlton	6.13 (49)	Punt Road Oval	40,000	19 August 1939

=== Round 18 ===
Home team	Home team score	Away team	Away team score	Venue	Crowd	Date
St Kilda	11.13 (79)	South Melbourne	6.16 (52)	Junction Oval	12,000	2 September 1939
Footscray	11.17 (83)	Hawthorn	6.7 (43)	Western Oval	3,500	2 September 1939
Collingwood	13.13 (91)	Richmond	8.11 (59)	Victoria Park	28,000	2 September 1939
Carlton	16.22 (118)	Essendon	8.14 (62)	Princes Park	10,000	2 September 1939
North Melbourne	11.10 (76)	Geelong	9.11 (65)	Arden Street Oval	3,500	2 September 1939
Melbourne	11.15 (81)	Fitzroy	4.11 (35)	MCG	9,043	2 September 1939

== Ladder ==
(P)	Premiers
	Qualified for finals

#	Team	P	W	L	D	PF	PA	%	Pts
1	Melbourne (P)	18	15	3	0	1928	1502	128.4	60
2	Collingwood	18	15	3	0	1872	1535	122.0	60
3	Richmond	18	13	5	0	1734	1469	118.0	52
4	St Kilda	18	13	5	0	1806	1550	116.5	52
5	Carlton	18	12	6	0	1796	1459	123.1	48
6	Essendon	18	8	10	0	1696	1749	97.0	32
7	Geelong	18	7	11	0	1582	1713	92.4	28
8	Fitzroy	18	6	11	1	1482	1661	89.2	26
9	North Melbourne	18	6	12	0	1561	1709	91.3	24
10	Hawthorn	18	5	12	1	1427	1657	86.1	22
11	Footscray	18	4	14	0	1494	1809	82.6	16
12	South Melbourne	18	3	15	0	1367	1932	70.8	12

Rules for classification: 1. premiership points; 2. percentage; 3. points for
Average score: 91.4
Source: AFL Tables

== Finals series ==
=== Semi-finals ===
Home team	Score	Away team	Score	Venue	Crowd	Date
Richmond	6.6 (42)	St Kilda	10.12 (72)	MCG	51,411	9 September
Melbourne	15.14 (104)	Collingwood	12.18 (90)	MCG	54,776	16 September

=== Preliminary final ===
Home team	Score	Away team	Score	Venue	Crowd	Date
Collingwood	20.14 (134)	St Kilda	15.15 (105)	MCG	66,848	23 September

== Season notes ==
- Two key rule changes were made nationally in 1939.
  - The holding the ball rule was altered to eliminate the provision for a player to drop the ball when tackled, meaning that a player was forced to either kick or handpass the ball when tackled to avoid conceding a free kick.
  - The boundary throw-in was reintroduced whenever the ball went out of bounds, except when put out deliberately, instead of a free kick being awarded against the last player to touch the ball, as had been the case since 1925.
- Hawthorn's win over Carlton in round 5 was its first as a member of the VFL. Carlton had won the first 25 meetings.
- All round 18 matches were postponed for a week because all grounds were under water from constant rain.
- North Melbourne's win over Geelong in Round 18 was the club's first since their initial meeting in round 1 of the 1925 VFL season, North Melbourne's first match as a member of the VFL, breaking a streak of 23 consecutive wins by Geelong.
- Ahead of its semi-final against Richmond on 9 September, St Kilda president Dave McNamara put to the club's committee that it borrow and wear South Melbourne's guernseys for the game, to wear the white and red colours of the Polish merchant service in place of the red, white and black colours of Germany in the week after the declaration of World War II. St Kilda had done similar during McNamara's playing days in World War I adopting Belgium's red, white and yellow in place of the German colours for several years; but on this occasion the club decided to remain in its traditional colours.

== Awards ==
- The 1939 VFL Premiership team was Melbourne.
- The VFL's leading goalkicker was Ron Todd of Collingwood with 98 goals (121 after finals).
- The Argus newspaper's "Player of the Year", was shared between Jack Dyer of Richmond and Dick Reynolds of Essendon.
- The winner of the 1939 Brownlow Medal was Marcus Whelan of Collingwood with 23 votes.
- South Melbourne took the "wooden spoon" in 1939.
- The seconds premiership was won by Melbourne. Melbourne 22.12 (144) defeated Richmond 17.13 (115) in the Grand Final, played as a stand-alone game on Thursday 28 September (Show Day holiday) at the Melbourne Cricket Ground, before a crowd of 4,100.

== Sources ==
- 1939 VFL season at AFL Tables
- 1939 VFL season at Australian Football
