= Chicken Smallhorn =

Australian rules footballer

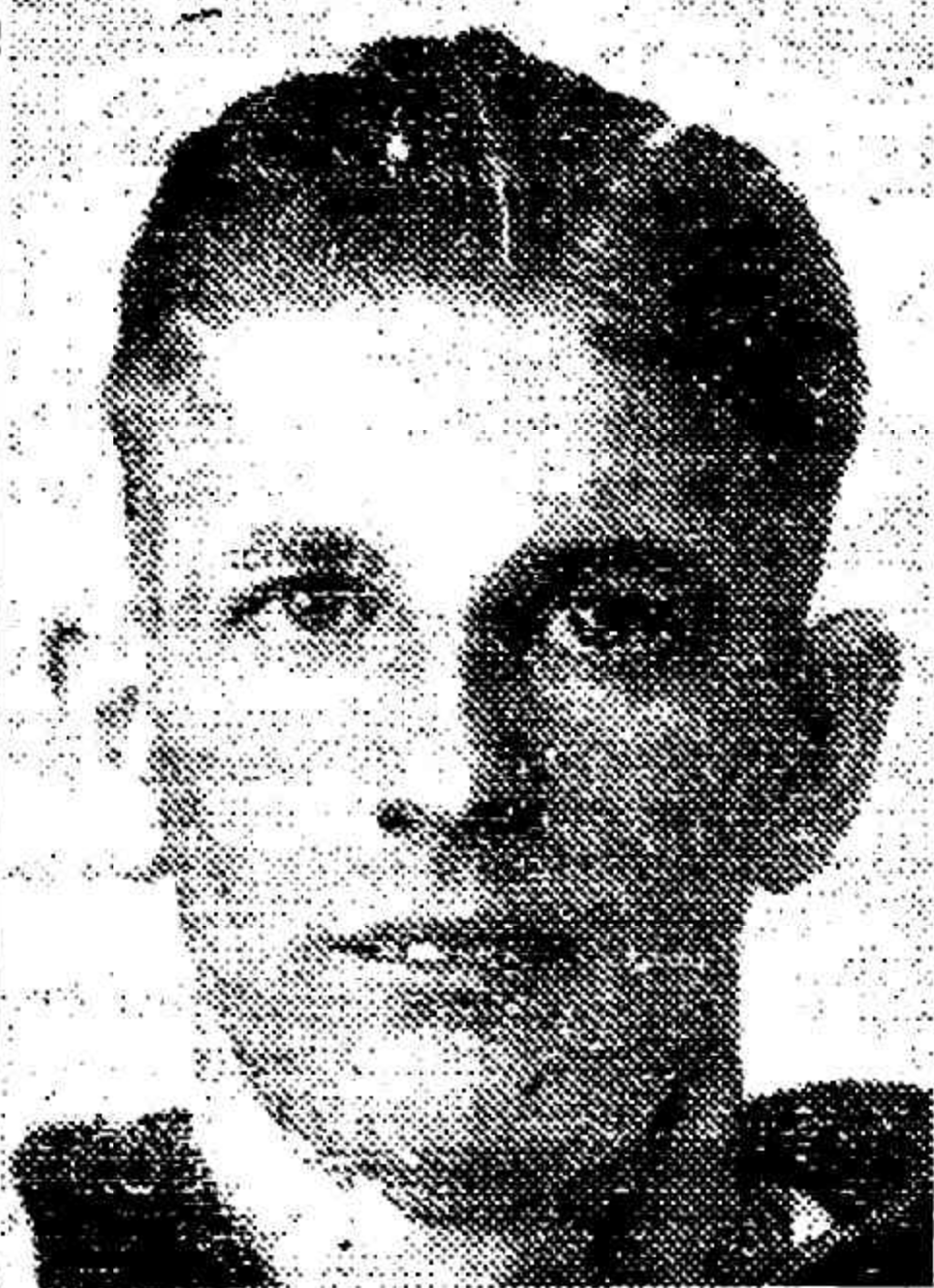
- Smallhorn in 1933

Personal information
- Full name: Wilfred Arthur Smallhorn
- Nickname: Chicken
- Born: 25 February 1911; Fitzroy North, Victoria
- Died: 27 November 1988 (aged 77); Repatriation General Hospital, Heidelberg, Victoria
- Original teams: Collingwood Technical School, East Brunswick Methodists
- Height: 170 cm (5 ft 7 in)
- Weight: 62 kg (137 lb)
- Position: Wing

Playing career
Years	Club	Games (Goals)
1930–1940	Fitzroy	150 (31)

Representative team honours
Years	Team	Games (Goals)
1932–1939	Victoria	7 (0)

Career highlights
- Brownlow Medal: 1933

Wilfred Arthur "Chicken" Smallhorn (25 February 1911 – 27 November 1988) was an Australian rules footballer who played for the Fitzroy Football Club in the Victorian Football League (VFL). Smallhorn played 150 games for Fitzroy between 1930 and 1940, winning the Brownlow Medal in 1933.

== Football career ==
Standing at just 170 centimetres tall and weighing 62 kg, Smallhorn (nicknamed "Chicken" because his mother could never catch him when he was young) was a deceptively quick winger who played 150 games (kicking 31 goals) for Fitzroy between 1930 and 1940.

Recruited from Collingwood Technical School and East Brunswick Methodists, where he was coached by former Fitzroy player Arnold Beitzel, Smallhorn later became a long-time panellist on Harry Beitzel's TV show (Harry was Arnold's son). His early football was played as a rover, but a best-on-ground performance on a wing in his debut with Fitzroy had him permanently shifted to that position.

He played his first game for Fitzroy, on 24 May 1930 (round four), against St Kilda at the Junction Oval. It was reported that "Smallhorn … was particularly cool and clever on the wing", in a side that unexpectedly lost to St Kilda 15.18 (118) to 8.10 (58), and that "in Smallhorn they have unearthed a most promising wingster, who in his first game was their best performer."

He won the Brownlow Medal in 1933, and represented Victoria seven times.

He had intended to retire at the end of the 1939 season; however, the Fitzroy Club convinced him to play again in 1940. In the round four match against Essendon, on 18 May 1940, now 29 years of age, Smallhorn was Fitzroy's best player. He received a knock behind the knee in the last five minutes of the match; and the injury was so severe that it ended his career.

== World War II ==
He enlisted in the AIF in June 1940. During the war he was taken prisoner by the Japanese and was in Changi Prison for three years and he was on the Burma Railway prior to that.

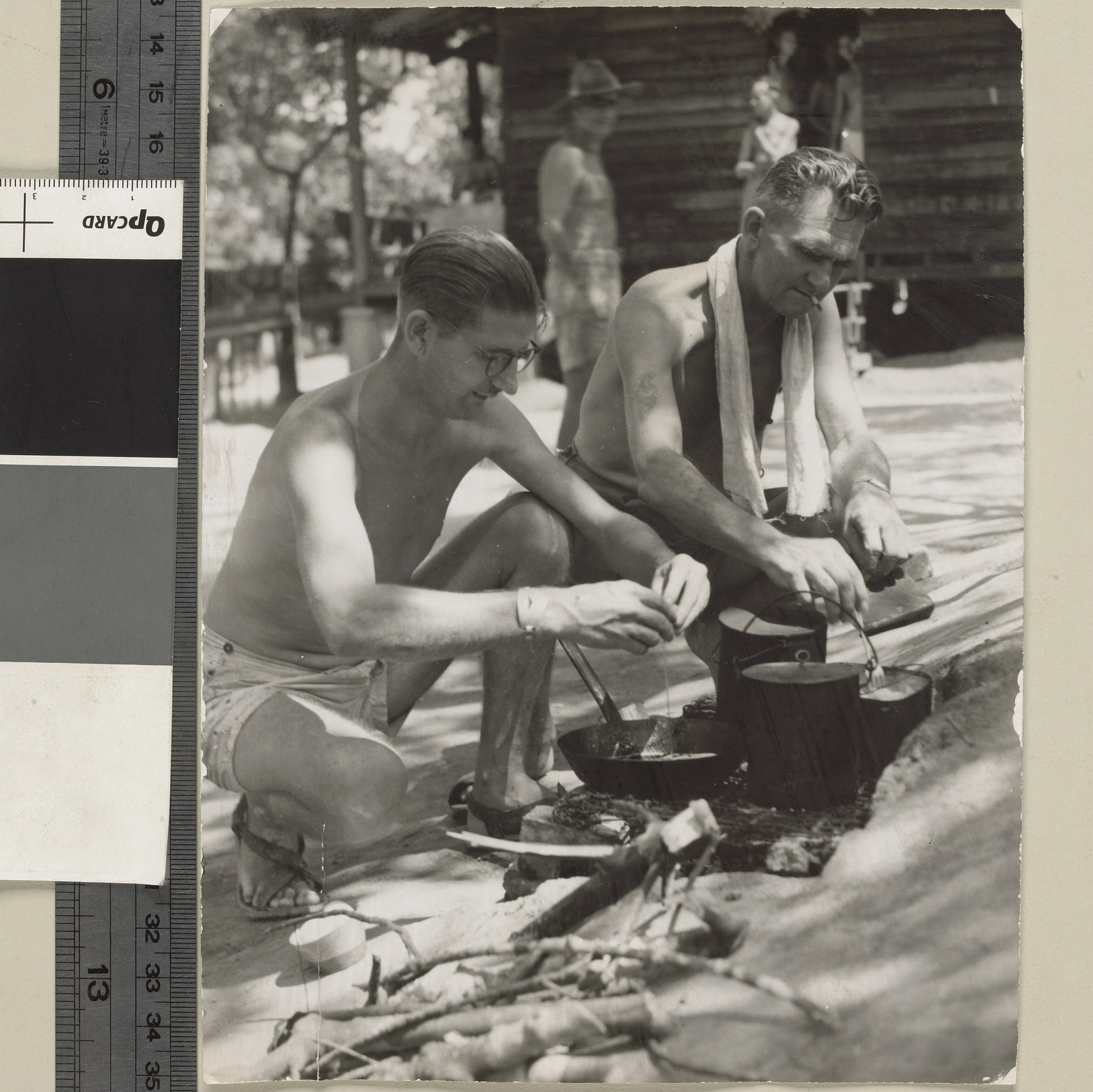

In 1942 Smallhorn was the main organiser of a football competition in Changi which consisted of six teams named after VFL clubs. The season lasted nine months and was run under similar lines to the VFL. They had clearances, tribunals and even their own Brownlow Medal known as the "Changi Brownlow". The first winner was Peter Chitty, who had played for St Kilda in the VFL.

The climax of the season was the final game between "Victoria" and the "Rest of Australia", which attracted 10,000 spectators.

== Family ==
Engaged to Violet Phyllis Burn in May 1939, and married in 1940, he was in the army when their son, Robert Leonard Smallhorn, was born. Because Smallhorn didn't return home until October 1945, Robert was almost four before he was introduced to him. Robert died in 1957 (at 14) from cancer.

== Legacy ==
Smallhorn later became a media personality. He died in 1988.

In the Bruce Dawe poem "Life cycle" Smallhorn is mentioned thus:

So that mythology may be perpetually renewed
and Chicken Smallhorn return like the maize-god
in a thousand shapes, the dancers changing

Smallhorn was named on the wing in Fitzroy's Team of the Century and he was inducted into the Australian Football Hall of Fame in 2006.
