= Wilbur Harris =

Australian rules footballer (1912–1981)

Personal information
- Full name: Harold Wilbur Harris
- Born: 28 May 1912
- Died: 28 June 1981 (aged 69)
- Original team: West Torrens
- Height: 188 cm (6 ft 2 in)
- Weight: 87 kg (192 lb)
- Position: Ruckman

Playing career^{1}
Years	Club	Games (Goals)
1933–41	South Melbourne	69 (19)
- ^{1} Playing statistics correct to the end of 1941.

Wilbur Harris (28 May 1912 – 28 June 1981) was an Australian rules footballer who played for South Melbourne in the Victorian Football League (VFL).

Harris was a ruckman, recruited from South Australian club West Torrens. The collection of players recruited from interstate in 1932/1933 became known as South Melbourne's "Foreign Legion".

He originally had trouble establishing a spot in the senior South Melbourne side, but was selected as 19th man in the 1934 VFL Grand Final. By 1937 Harris was a regular in the senior team. He kicked 12 of his 19 career goals that year. In 1941 he was cleared to play for Williamstown in the Victorian Football Association, but never played for them, returning to play six more games for South Melbourne.
