= Marcus Whelan =

Australian rules footballer (1914–1973)

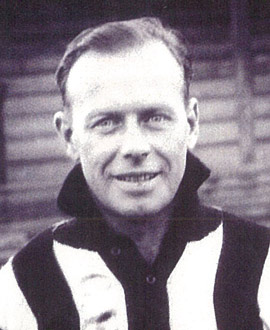
- Whelan during his Collingwood career

Personal information
- Full name: Marcus Joseph Whelan
- Born: 27 June 1914; Bacchus Marsh, Victoria
- Died: 31 August 1973 (aged 59); Mornington, Victoria
- Original teams: Noorat, Darley
- Height: 175 cm (5 ft 9 in)
- Weight: 67 kg (148 lb)

Playing career^{1}
Years	Club	Games (Goals)
1933–42; 1946–47	Collingwood	173 (31)
- ^{1} Playing statistics correct to the end of 1947.

Career highlights
- Collingwood premiership team, 1935, 1936; Collingwood Grand Final team, 1937, 1938, 1939; Brownlow Medal, 1939; Copeland Trophy, 1939; Victorian representative 3 times; Collingwood Team of the Century

Marcus Joseph Whelan (27 June 1914 – 31 August 1973) was an Australian rules footballer who played for Collingwood in the Victorian Football League (VFL).

== Family ==
The son of John Whelan and Ellen Margaret Whelan, née Parker, he was born in Bacchus Marsh on 27 June 1914. He married Marjorie Alice Dummett on 14 October 1939.

Whelan's son Shane played for Collingwood between 1967 and 1969; and his granddaughter is the actress/television presenter Nicky Whelan.

== Football ==
=== Collingwood ===
Whelan played mostly in the midfield as a centreman, although he played some 40 games at full-back. He was a fine, long drop-kick, and an expert place-kick. Whelan won the Brownlow Medal in 1939 and was also awarded Collingwood's best-and-fairest award, the Copeland Trophy. After fighting in World War II, he returned to the Victorian Football League in 1946 and retired at the end of the 1947 season.

Sports journalist Michael Roberts and former Australian rules footballer described Whelan as being "a famously cool, calm and polished performer."

In 1956, Jack Dyer called Whelan one of the best centremen of his time. “He was a spectacular player who could take a brilliant high mark and could hold his own with a ruckman,” Dyer wrote.

Fellow Collingwood player Bob Rose concurred: “He was a magnificent stab kick and could dispose of the ball perfectly while travelling at top speed.”

=== St Kilda ===
In 1948, he was cleared from Collingwood to play with the St Kilda Second XVIII as captain-coach.

=== Carrum ===
In 1949, he was appointed captain-coach of the Carrum Football Club in the Mornington Peninsula Football League.

== Employment ==
Whelan worked at Carlton & United Breweries in Melbourne, alongside his coach Jock McHale.
