= Frank Aked Jr. =

Australian rules footballer, born 1932

Frank Aked

Personal information
- Born: 5 February 1932; Preston, Victoria
- Died: 24 November 1976 (aged 44); Yarraville, Victoria
- Original team: Footscray Seconds
- Debut: Round 14, 1951, Footscray vs. North Melbourne, at Arden St
- Height: 180 cm (5 ft 11 in)
- Weight: 81.5 kg (180 lb)

Playing career^{1}
Years	Club	Games (Goals)
1951–1952	Footscray	4 (0)
- ^{1} Playing statistics correct to the end of 1952.

Frank "Dolly" Aked Jr. (5 February 1932 – 24 November 1976) was an Australian rules football player. He played with Footscray, now known as the Western Bulldogs. He played four games in the early 1950s.

Aked junior's playing measurements were 180 cm and 81.5 kg.

Aked played with Yarrawonga Football Club from 1953 to 1955 and won the 1954 (80 goals) and 1955 (77) Ovens and Murray Football League goal kicking award.

Aked was a member of the 1954 Ovens & Murray Football League side that won the VCFL Country Championships.

Aked died suddenly of a heart attack at the age of 44.

His father, Frank Aked Sr., also played for Footscray, commencing his VFL career in Footscray's inaugural season in 1925.
