= 1933 VFL season =

37th season of the Victorian Football League (VFL)

1933 VFL premiership season

Overview
- Date: 29 April – 30 September 1933
- Teams: 12
- Premiers: South Melbourne; 3rd premiership
- Runners-up: Richmond; 7th runners-up result
- Minor premiers: Richmond; 2nd minor premiership
- Brownlow Medallist: Chicken Smallhorn (Fitzroy); 18 votes
- Leading goalkicker medallist: Bob Pratt (South Melbourne); 102 goals

Attendance
- Matches played: 112
- Total attendance: 1,942,580 (17,344 per match)
- Highest (H&A): 43,000 (round 11, Carlton v Richmond)
- Highest (finals): 75,754 (grand final, South Melbourne v Richmond)

The 1933 VFL season was the 37th season of the Victorian Football League (VFL), the highest-level senior Australian rules football competition in Victoria. The season featured twelve clubs and ran from 29 April to 30 September, comprising an 18-match home-and-away season followed by a four-week finals series featuring the top four clubs.

South Melbourne won the premiership, defeating Richmond by 42 points in the 1933 VFL grand final; it was South Melbourne's third VFL premiership. Richmond won the minor premiership by finishing atop the home-and-away ladder with a 15–3 win–loss record. Fitzroy's Chicken Smallhorn won the Brownlow Medal as the league's best and fairest player, and South Melbourne's Bob Pratt won the leading goalkicker medal as the league's leading goalkicker.

== Background ==
In 1933, the VFL competition consisted of twelve teams of 18 on-the-field players each, plus one substitute player, known as the 19th man. A player could be substituted for any reason; however, once substituted, a player could not return to the field of play under any circumstances.

Teams played each other in a home-and-away season of 18 rounds; matches 12 to 18 were the "home-and-way reverse" of matches 1 to 7.

Once the 18 round home-and-away season had finished, the 1933 VFL Premiers were determined by the specific format and conventions of the Page–McIntyre system.

== Home-and-away season ==
=== Round 1 ===
Home team	Home team score	Away team	Away team score	Venue	Crowd	Date
Melbourne	9.10 (64)	Richmond	14.12 (96)	MCG	19,583	29 April 1933
Collingwood	14.15 (99)	Geelong	12.17 (89)	Victoria Park	15,500	29 April 1933
Carlton	12.15 (87)	South Melbourne	11.17 (83)	Princes Park	37,000	29 April 1933
St Kilda	10.17 (77)	Hawthorn	11.13 (79)	Junction Oval	14,000	29 April 1933
North Melbourne	11.13 (79)	Fitzroy	11.13 (79)	Arden Street Oval	12,000	29 April 1933
Footscray	11.11 (77)	Essendon	10.11 (71)	Western Oval	19,000	29 April 1933

=== Round 2 ===
Home team	Home team score	Away team	Away team score	Venue	Crowd	Date
Geelong	13.12 (90)	Melbourne	11.6 (72)	Corio Oval	10,000	6 May 1933
Essendon	13.13 (91)	St Kilda	12.6 (78)	Windy Hill	17,000	6 May 1933
Richmond	24.16 (160)	North Melbourne	9.12 (66)	Punt Road Oval	19,000	6 May 1933
South Melbourne	18.17 (125)	Footscray	14.15 (99)	Lake Oval	29,000	6 May 1933
Fitzroy	16.10 (106)	Collingwood	11.15 (81)	Brunswick Street Oval	22,000	6 May 1933
Hawthorn	10.12 (72)	Carlton	11.14 (80)	Glenferrie Oval	16,000	6 May 1933

=== Round 3 ===
Home team	Home team score	Away team	Away team score	Venue	Crowd	Date
Footscray	6.14 (50)	Richmond	4.10 (34)	Western Oval	12,500	13 May 1933
Collingwood	10.11 (71)	South Melbourne	9.3 (57)	Victoria Park	10,000	13 May 1933
Carlton	8.9 (57)	Geelong	13.16 (94)	Princes Park	14,000	13 May 1933
North Melbourne	10.15 (75)	Hawthorn	10.7 (67)	Arden Street Oval	5,000	13 May 1933
St Kilda	9.5 (59)	Fitzroy	21.17 (143)	Junction Oval	9,000	13 May 1933
Melbourne	15.9 (99)	Essendon	10.10 (70)	MCG	9,479	13 May 1933

=== Round 4 ===
Home team	Home team score	Away team	Away team score	Venue	Crowd	Date
Geelong	17.20 (122)	North Melbourne	11.12 (78)	Corio Oval	9,000	20 May 1933
Fitzroy	11.16 (82)	Melbourne	11.13 (79)	Brunswick Street Oval	22,000	20 May 1933
South Melbourne	11.14 (80)	St Kilda	10.16 (76)	Lake Oval	20,000	20 May 1933
Hawthorn	7.15 (57)	Footscray	14.10 (94)	Glenferrie Oval	12,000	20 May 1933
Richmond	13.15 (93)	Collingwood	11.8 (74)	Punt Road Oval	28,000	20 May 1933
Essendon	11.10 (76)	Carlton	13.18 (96)	Windy Hill	20,000	20 May 1933

=== Round 5 ===
Home team	Home team score	Away team	Away team score	Venue	Crowd	Date
Hawthorn	7.14 (56)	Richmond	9.9 (63)	Glenferrie Oval	12,000	27 May 1933
Essendon	12.11 (83)	South Melbourne	17.15 (117)	Windy Hill	18,000	27 May 1933
St Kilda	13.19 (97)	North Melbourne	11.17 (83)	Junction Oval	13,000	27 May 1933
Melbourne	10.17 (77)	Footscray	14.13 (97)	MCG	22,029	27 May 1933
Geelong	18.15 (123)	Fitzroy	2.7 (19)	Corio Oval	15,000	27 May 1933
Collingwood	14.20 (104)	Carlton	14.16 (100)	Victoria Park	25,000	27 May 1933

=== Round 6 ===
Home team	Home team score	Away team	Away team score	Venue	Crowd	Date
South Melbourne	10.13 (73)	Hawthorn	9.6 (60)	Lake Oval	13,000	3 June 1933
Richmond	13.10 (88)	Geelong	10.11 (71)	Punt Road Oval	30,000	3 June 1933
Fitzroy	19.11 (125)	Essendon	14.9 (93)	Brunswick Street Oval	14,000	3 June 1933
Footscray	12.11 (83)	St Kilda	9.16 (70)	Western Oval	20,000	5 June 1933
Carlton	13.13 (91)	Melbourne	12.15 (87)	Princes Park	32,000	5 June 1933
North Melbourne	17.11 (113)	Collingwood	14.13 (97)	Arden Street Oval	18,000	5 June 1933

=== Round 7 ===
Home team	Home team score	Away team	Away team score	Venue	Crowd	Date
Geelong	17.14 (116)	South Melbourne	13.15 (93)	Corio Oval	14,000	10 June 1933
Fitzroy	8.17 (65)	Richmond	10.13 (73)	Brunswick Street Oval	29,500	10 June 1933
Essendon	15.6 (96)	Hawthorn	16.9 (105)	Windy Hill	9,000	10 June 1933
North Melbourne	11.12 (78)	Footscray	8.14 (62)	Arden Street Oval	20,000	10 June 1933
Melbourne	13.19 (97)	Collingwood	18.18 (126)	MCG	18,020	10 June 1933
St Kilda	10.5 (65)	Carlton	20.10 (130)	Junction Oval	21,000	10 June 1933

=== Round 8 ===
Home team	Home team score	Away team	Away team score	Venue	Crowd	Date
Melbourne	9.15 (69)	North Melbourne	14.9 (93)	MCG	11,647	17 June 1933
Essendon	8.11 (59)	Geelong	17.15 (117)	Windy Hill	10,000	17 June 1933
Collingwood	14.23 (107)	St Kilda	8.15 (63)	Victoria Park	11,000	17 June 1933
Carlton	21.13 (139)	Footscray	17.14 (116)	Princes Park	26,000	17 June 1933
South Melbourne	15.13 (103)	Richmond	16.12 (108)	Lake Oval	30,000	17 June 1933
Hawthorn	9.14 (68)	Fitzroy	11.13 (79)	Glenferrie Oval	13,000	17 June 1933

=== Round 9 ===
Home team	Home team score	Away team	Away team score	Venue	Crowd	Date
Geelong	18.25 (133)	Hawthorn	3.6 (24)	Corio Oval	6,000	24 June 1933
Fitzroy	15.7 (97)	South Melbourne	11.12 (78)	Brunswick Street Oval	20,000	24 June 1933
St Kilda	13.12 (90)	Melbourne	3.15 (33)	Junction Oval	9,000	24 June 1933
Richmond	16.14 (110)	Essendon	8.11 (59)	Punt Road Oval	12,000	24 June 1933
Footscray	9.11 (65)	Collingwood	7.18 (60)	Western Oval	18,000	24 June 1933
North Melbourne	6.17 (53)	Carlton	11.14 (80)	Arden Street Oval	26,000	24 June 1933

=== Round 10 ===
Home team	Home team score	Away team	Away team score	Venue	Crowd	Date
Richmond	16.14 (110)	St Kilda	8.8 (56)	Punt Road Oval	13,000	1 July 1933
Essendon	9.21 (75)	North Melbourne	15.18 (108)	Windy Hill	11,000	1 July 1933
South Melbourne	13.10 (88)	Melbourne	12.9 (81)	Lake Oval	10,000	1 July 1933
Geelong	11.16 (82)	Footscray	7.15 (57)	Corio Oval	15,000	1 July 1933
Hawthorn	5.14 (44)	Collingwood	15.6 (96)	Glenferrie Oval	10,000	1 July 1933
Fitzroy	5.19 (49)	Carlton	13.14 (92)	Brunswick Street Oval	33,000	1 July 1933

=== Round 11 ===
Home team	Home team score	Away team	Away team score	Venue	Crowd	Date
North Melbourne	13.12 (90)	South Melbourne	15.13 (103)	Arden Street Oval	15,000	8 July 1933
Collingwood	20.19 (139)	Essendon	14.14 (98)	Victoria Park	8,500	8 July 1933
Carlton	10.10 (70)	Richmond	9.13 (67)	Princes Park	43,000	8 July 1933
Melbourne	21.10 (136)	Hawthorn	15.8 (98)	MCG	6,877	8 July 1933
St Kilda	11.14 (80)	Geelong	7.13 (55)	Junction Oval	10,000	8 July 1933
Footscray	15.6 (96)	Fitzroy	8.14 (62)	Western Oval	18,000	8 July 1933

=== Round 12 ===
Home team	Home team score	Away team	Away team score	Venue	Crowd	Date
Hawthorn	7.9 (51)	St Kilda	8.15 (63)	Glenferrie Oval	10,000	15 July 1933
Fitzroy	17.16 (118)	North Melbourne	11.9 (75)	Brunswick Street Oval	14,000	15 July 1933
Essendon	14.7 (91)	Footscray	15.13 (103)	Windy Hill	16,000	15 July 1933
Richmond	20.15 (135)	Melbourne	12.13 (85)	Punt Road Oval	11,000	15 July 1933
Geelong	13.18 (96)	Collingwood	9.7 (61)	Corio Oval	12,250	15 July 1933
South Melbourne	15.13 (103)	Carlton	9.6 (60)	Lake Oval	32,000	15 July 1933

=== Round 13 ===
Home team	Home team score	Away team	Away team score	Venue	Crowd	Date
North Melbourne	8.8 (56)	Richmond	20.11 (131)	Arden Street Oval	12,000	22 July 1933
Footscray	8.11 (59)	South Melbourne	19.15 (129)	Western Oval	27,000	22 July 1933
Collingwood	7.21 (63)	Fitzroy	9.10 (64)	Victoria Park	21,000	22 July 1933
Carlton	13.20 (98)	Hawthorn	10.14 (74)	Princes Park	12,000	22 July 1933
Melbourne	12.16 (88)	Geelong	18.15 (123)	MCG	10,249	22 July 1933
St Kilda	12.20 (92)	Essendon	13.9 (87)	Junction Oval	11,000	22 July 1933

=== Round 14 ===
Home team	Home team score	Away team	Away team score	Venue	Crowd	Date
Hawthorn	9.8 (62)	North Melbourne	10.14 (74)	Glenferrie Oval	4,000	29 July 1933
Fitzroy	19.10 (124)	St Kilda	6.9 (45)	Brunswick Street Oval	14,000	29 July 1933
Essendon	14.7 (91)	Melbourne	15.16 (106)	Windy Hill	6,000	29 July 1933
Richmond	18.16 (124)	Footscray	9.11 (65)	Punt Road Oval	18,000	29 July 1933
South Melbourne	13.11 (89)	Collingwood	12.11 (83)	Lake Oval	24,000	29 July 1933
Geelong	17.15 (117)	Carlton	5.14 (44)	Corio Oval	14,500	29 July 1933

=== Round 15 ===
Home team	Home team score	Away team	Away team score	Venue	Crowd	Date
St Kilda	8.19 (67)	South Melbourne	13.15 (93)	Junction Oval	20,000	5 August 1933
Footscray	16.14 (110)	Hawthorn	9.18 (72)	Western Oval	8,000	5 August 1933
Collingwood	15.16 (106)	Richmond	10.8 (68)	Victoria Park	15,000	5 August 1933
Carlton	14.22 (106)	Essendon	9.9 (63)	Princes Park	15,000	5 August 1933
North Melbourne	9.7 (61)	Geelong	15.10 (100)	Arden Street Oval	8,000	5 August 1933
Melbourne	9.15 (69)	Fitzroy	13.8 (86)	MCG	14,962	5 August 1933

=== Round 16 ===
Home team	Home team score	Away team	Away team score	Venue	Crowd	Date
North Melbourne	15.17 (107)	St Kilda	10.12 (72)	Arden Street Oval	9,000	19 August 1933
Footscray	19.10 (124)	Melbourne	14.10 (94)	Western Oval	8,000	19 August 1933
Fitzroy	15.8 (98)	Geelong	11.20 (86)	Brunswick Street Oval	21,000	19 August 1933
Carlton	14.8 (92)	Collingwood	15.11 (101)	Princes Park	19,000	19 August 1933
Richmond	11.17 (83)	Hawthorn	9.6 (60)	Punt Road Oval	9,000	19 August 1933
South Melbourne	11.16 (82)	Essendon	6.4 (40)	Lake Oval	13,000	19 August 1933

=== Round 17 ===
Home team	Home team score	Away team	Away team score	Venue	Crowd	Date
Hawthorn	8.12 (60)	South Melbourne	17.11 (113)	Glenferrie Oval	12,500	26 August 1933
Geelong	10.10 (70)	Richmond	14.10 (94)	Corio Oval	22,250	26 August 1933
Essendon	12.13 (85)	Fitzroy	10.17 (77)	Windy Hill	13,000	26 August 1933
Collingwood	25.15 (165)	North Melbourne	17.19 (121)	Victoria Park	8,000	26 August 1933
St Kilda	21.11 (137)	Footscray	14.21 (105)	Junction Oval	9,500	26 August 1933
Melbourne	10.11 (71)	Carlton	19.21 (135)	MCG	17,327	26 August 1933

=== Round 18 ===
Home team	Home team score	Away team	Away team score	Venue	Crowd	Date
Footscray	7.16 (58)	North Melbourne	6.17 (53)	Western Oval	7,000	2 September 1933
Collingwood	19.13 (127)	Melbourne	15.14 (104)	Victoria Park	7,000	2 September 1933
Carlton	20.25 (145)	St Kilda	14.9 (93)	Princes Park	18,000	2 September 1933
South Melbourne	23.17 (155)	Geelong	6.10 (46)	Lake Oval	30,000	2 September 1933
Richmond	16.13 (109)	Fitzroy	9.7 (61)	Punt Road Oval	21,000	2 September 1933
Hawthorn	10.9 (69)	Essendon	8.16 (64)	Glenferrie Oval	4,000	2 September 1933

== Ladder ==
(P)	Premiers
	Qualified for finals

#	Team	P	W	L	D	PF	PA	%	Pts
1	Richmond	18	15	3	0	1746	1237	141.1	60
2	South Melbourne (P)	18	13	5	0	1764	1383	127.5	52
3	Carlton	18	13	5	0	1702	1488	114.4	52
4	Geelong	18	12	6	0	1730	1327	130.4	48
5	Fitzroy	18	11	6	1	1534	1453	105.6	46
6	Collingwood	18	11	7	0	1760	1559	112.9	44
7	Footscray	18	11	7	0	1520	1555	97.7	44
8	North Melbourne	18	7	10	1	1463	1717	85.2	30
9	St Kilda	18	6	12	0	1380	1706	80.9	24
10	Melbourne	18	3	15	0	1511	1842	82.0	12
11	Hawthorn	18	3	15	0	1178	1607	73.3	12
12	Essendon	18	2	16	0	1392	1806	77.1	8

Rules for classification: 1. premiership points; 2. percentage; 3. points for
Average score: 86.5
Source: AFL Tables

== Finals series ==
=== Semi-finals ===
Home team	Score	Away team	Score	Venue	Crowd	Date
Carlton	10.11 (71)	Geelong	12.12 (84)	MCG	40,225	9 September
Richmond	11.11 (77)	South Melbourne	14.11 (95)	MCG	49,303	16 September

=== Preliminary final ===
Home team	Score	Away team	Score	Venue	Crowd	Date
Richmond	13.5 (83)	Geelong	10.14 (74)	MCG	48,125	23 September

== Season notes ==
- "Checker" Hughes took over as coach of Melbourne. He renamed the team "The Demons" from "The Fuchsias."
- In Round 5, St Kilda defeated North Melbourne 13.19 (97) to 11.17 (83), despite having only 15 players left at the end of a brutal match, which was stopped at one stage because a wild brawl, instigated by the North Melbourne players, had erupted in the centre.
  - St Kilda captain Clarrie Hindson had a broken ankle, full-forward Bill Mohr had two broken ribs, forward Jack Anderson had been knocked unconscious, centreman W.C. "Billy" Roberts was felled once, recovered, and then was felled a second time, and rover Roy "Tiger" Bence was also knocked out.
  - The St Kilda President, Gallipoli veteran and naval war hero Commander Fred Arlington-Burke, described St Kilda's 15-man victory as the greatest moral victory in the club's history, and a "Badge of Courage" was struck by the Football Club and was awarded to each of the players that took part in the match.
  - The medallion is silver, coin shaped, with coin-like reeding around its outer perimeter (with no circumferential milling), with a St Kilda Football Club badge affixed to it, and the following inscription: "St KILDA DEFEATED Nth MELBOURNE WITH 15 MEN MAY 27th 1933". (Photograph of Medal at Ross, 1996, p. 140)
- In Round 8, Essendon experimented with a siren, rather than a bell, at Windy Hill.
- In the dying minutes of the close South Melbourne–Richmond match in Round 8, umpire Jack McMurray Sr. awarded a controversial free kick against Richmond full back Maurie Sheahan, judging that he was deliberately wasting time by setting up to kick in with a place kick after a South Melbourne behind – despite the fact that time was off until the kick-in was executed. The resulting goal narrowed South Melbourne's deficit to five points, but the bell sounded almost immediately after the next centre bounce.
- In the 1933 Interstate Carnival, held in Sydney, the Victorian team won all five of its matches.
- During the 1933 Carnival, the Australian National Football Council considered a proposal from the New South Wales Rugby Football League that the two codes merge and play a single, Australian "national" game. A trial match of this proposed universal football was conducted behind closed doors during the carnival. The ANFC subsequently rejected the proposal.
- The President of the South Melbourne Football Club, grocery magnate Archie Crofts, had brought so many interstate players to South Melbourne – with the promise of a well-paid regular job in one of the Crofts Grocery chain stores in addition to their receiving maximum playing and training fees allowable under the "Coulter Law" – that the 1933 team was christened "The Foreign Legion". Those comprising the "Foreign Legion" were Bert Beard, John Bowe, Brighton Diggins, Bill Faul, and Joe O'Meara from Western Australia, Ossie Bertram, Wilbur Harris, and Jack Wade from South Australia, and Frank Davies and Laurie Nash from Tasmania. South Melbourne played in four consecutive Grand Finals from 1933 to 1936, but won only the 1933 premiership.
- North Melbourne's win over Collingwood in Round 6 was the first by one of the three 1925 entrants (Footscray, Hawthorn, North Melbourne) over the Magpies. Prior to that, Collingwood had won the first 37 meetings against the three newest clubs. Footscray's first win over Collingwood came in Round 9 of this season. Hawthorn, however, would not record its first win over Collingwood until Round 5 of the 1942 VFL season (in the 30th regular-season meeting between the two clubs).

== Awards ==
- The 1933 VFL Premiership team was South Melbourne.
- The VFL's leading goalkicker was Gordon Coventry of Collingwood with 108 goals.
- The winner of the 1933 Brownlow Medal was Wilfred Smallhorn of Fitzroy with 18 votes.
- Essendon took the "wooden spoon" in 1933. Essendon would not "win" another wooden spoon until 2016 (eighty-three years), the second longest spoon drought in league history.
- The seconds premiership was won by Melbourne for the third consecutive season. Melbourne 10.15 (75) defeated St Kilda 10.14 (74) in the Grand Final, played as a stand-alone game on Thursday 28 September (Show Day holiday) at the Melbourne Cricket Ground before a crowd of 9,500.

== See also ==
- List of VFL debuts in 1933

== Sources ==
- 1933 VFL season at AFL Tables
- 1933 VFL season at Australian Football
