= Mick Hughson =

Australian rules footballer, born 1915

Personal information
- Full name: Magnus James Mitchell Hughson
- Born: 13 December 1915; Northcote, Victoria
- Died: 20 June 1992 (aged 76)
- Height: 182 cm (6 ft 0 in)
- Weight: 71 kg (157 lb)
- Position: Centre

Playing career^{1}
Years	Club	Games (Goals)
1937–42, 1945–46	Fitzroy	95 (17)
- ^{1} Playing statistics correct to the end of 1946.

Magnus James Mitchell Hughson (13 December 1915 – 20 June 1992) was an Australian rules footballer, who played with Fitzroy in the Victorian Football League (VFL).
