= Frank Aked Sr. =

Australian rules footballer

Frank Aked

Personal information
- Full name: Frank Aked
- Born: 25 November 1902; Geelong, Victoria
- Died: 28 January 1993 (aged 90); Werribee, Victoria
- Original team: Preston
- Debut: Round 10, 1925, Footscray vs. Collingwood, at Western Oval

Playing career^{1}
Years	Club	Games (Goals)
1925–1932	Footscray	108 (59)
1933	Hawthorn	8 (2)
Total		116 (61)
- ^{1} Playing statistics correct to the end of 1933.

Frank "Dolly" Aked (25 November 1902 – 28 January 1993) was an Australian rules football player. He played with Footscray, now known as the Western Bulldogs, being a member of the inaugural team that entered the then Victorian Football League in 1925. He was recruited from Preston as a ruckman and played mostly in that position for the majority of his career. His son Frank Aked Jr. also played four games for Footscray in the 1950s. Aked Sr.'s playing measurements were 183 cm and 86 kg, which would definitely not have him playing ruck in the modern era.

Holmesby and Main describe him as a "good mark and wonderful trier". He played one season for Hawthorn in 1933 before returning to Footscray to coach the reserves, taking them to their first ever finals appearance (being also the club's first in the VFL at any level). He was a trainer with the senior team for many years and was a well-known figure around the club for decades. He was the grandfather of Richmond and Collingwood player Allan Edwards, who played the final year of his career with Footscray in 1984.
