= Deaths in March 1993 =

The following is a list of notable deaths in March 1993.

Entries for each day are listed alphabetically by surname. A typical entry lists information in the following sequence:

- Name, age, country of citizenship at birth, subsequent country of citizenship (if applicable), reason for notability, cause of death (if known), and reference.

== March 1993 ==
=== 1 ===
- Joseph Christopher, 37, American serial killer, male breast cancer.
- Terry Frost, 86, American actor (Law of the Range, Cheyenne, The Maverick), heart attack.
- Rudolph Glossop, 91, British mining and civil engineer.
- Arnold Hirtz, 82, Swiss Olympic ice hockey player (1936).
- Patrick Kavanagh, 73, Irish Olympic footballer (1948).
- Luis Kutner, 84, American lawyer.
- Ronald McCuaig, 84, Australian poet, journalist, and children's author.
- Nicola Monti, 72, Italian opera singer.
- Kari Tolvanen, 76, Finnish Olympic equestrian (1956).
- Oleg Zaytsev, 53, Soviet ice hockey defenceman and Olympian (1964, 1968).

=== 2 ===
- André Bareau, 71, French Buddhologist.
- Rudolf Demetrovics, 78, Hungarian-born Romanian footballer.
- Julius Ebert, 94, Danish Olympic long-distance runner (1920).
- Bob Hammond, 87, Australian rules footballer.
- Hans Hilfiker, 91, Swiss engineer (Swiss railway clock).
- Hjalmar Thomsen, 79, Danish Olympic field hockey player (1948).
- Frans Westergren, 78, Swedish Olympic wrestler (1948).
- Paul D. Zimmerman, 54, American screenwriter (The King of Comedy), colon cancer.

=== 3 ===
- Milton Bororo, 60, Brazilian footballer and Olympian (1952).
- Mel Bradford, 58, American politician and academic.
- Robert Carricart, 76, French-American film, television and theatre actor.
- Bill Draut, 71, American comic book artist (Phantom Stranger, The Flash, House of Mystery).
- Joey Fischer, 18, American murder victim.
- Jesús Bal y Gay, 87, Spanish composer, music critic, and musicologist.
- Harper Goff, 81, American musician, art director, and actor.
- Yoshio Kojima, 61, Japanese hammer thrower and Olympian (1956), suicide.
- Carlos Marcello, 83, Italian-American mobster (New Orleans crime family), stroke.
- Carlos Montoya, 89, Spanish flamenco guitarist, heart failure.
- James Allen Red Dog, 39, American convicted murderer, execution by lethal injection.
- Albert Sabin, 86, Polish-American virologist, heart failure.
- Xie Xuegong, 76, Chinese politician.

=== 4 ===
- Jerome Ambro, 64, American politician, member of the United States House of Representatives (1975-1981).
- Bill Antonello, 65, American baseball player (Brooklyn Dodgers).
- Georgette Anys, 83, French actress, cancer.
- Anšlavs Eglītis, 86, Latvian writer, journalist and painter, cancer.
- Art Hodes, 88, American jazz pianist.
- Tomislav Ivčić, 40, Croatian pop singer, songwriter and politician, traffic collision.
- Frank Johnson, 70, Australian rugby league footballer.
- Varujan Kojian, 57, Armenian-American conductor.
- Izaak Kolthoff, 99, Dutch-American chemist and academic.
- Kaisu Leppänen, 88, Finnish actress.
- Ed Opalewski, 73, American football player (Detroit Lions).
- Nicholas Ridley, Baron Ridley of Liddesdale, 64, English politician, MP (1959–1992), lung cancer.
- Richard Sale, 81, American screenwriter and director.

=== 5 ===
- Colin Allan, 71, New Zealand colonial administrator and author.
- Alfred Ashley-Brown, 85, Australian politician, MP (1972–1974).
- Hans Christian Blech, 78, German actor.
- Cyril Collard, 35, French filmmaker (Savage Nights), AIDS.
- Herschel Daugherty, 82, American television and film director and actor.
- Jean Földeák, 89, German Olympic wrestler (1932).
- Wallace Givens, 82, American mathematician and computer scientist.
- Egil Borgen Johansen, 58, Norwegian Olympic archer (1972).
- Robert McCance, 94, British paediatrician, biochemist and nutritionist.
- Jeyhun Mirzayev, 46, Azerbaijani actor, heart attack.
- Robert Sawyer, 41, American convicted murderer, execution by lethal injection.
- Mac Speedie, 73, American Hall of Fame gridiron football player (Cleveland Browns).

=== 6 ===
- Takahide Aioi, 81, Japanese flying ace during World War II.
- Kåre Bjørnsen, 58, Norwegian footballer.
- Valentina Borisenko, 73, Soviet chess player.
- Andrew Gilchrist, 82, Scottish diplomat.
- Dan Johnson, 48, Canadian ice hockey player.
- Bengt Lindblad, 67, Swedish Olympic wrestler (1952, 1956).
- Douglas Marland, 58, American screenwriter (Guiding Light, As the World Turns, Another World), complications from abdominal surgery.
- Walther Siegmund-Schultze, 76, German musicologist.
- George Stumpf, 82, American baseball player (Boston Red Sox, Chicago White Sox).
- Pierre Vandame, 79, French Olympic field hockey player (1948).

=== 7 ===
- Mariya Barabanova, 81, Soviet and Russian stage and film actress.
- Duane Carter, 79, American racing driver.
- Arnold Franchetti, 81–82, Italian-American composer.
- Tony Harris, 76, South African cricket player.
- Sammy Jones, 81, Irish footballer.
- Whitey Kachan, 67, American basketball player (Minneapolis Lakers).
- J. Merrill Knapp, 78, American musicologist and academic.
- Martti Larni, 83, Finnish writer.
- Patricia Lawrence, 67, English actress.
- Carlo Mazzarella, 73, Italian actor and journalist, lung cancer.
- Angelo Piccaluga, 86, Italian football player.
- Jim Spavital, 66, American gridiron football player, coach and executive.
- Jeremy Tree, 67, British thoroughbred racehorse trainer.
- Frank Wells, 83, Australian rules footballer.
- Earl Wrightson, 77, American singer, heart failure.

=== 8 ===
- Ria Bancroft, 86, British-New Zealand artist.
- Don Barksdale, 69, American Hall of Fame basketball player (Boston Celtics), and Olympian (1948), throat cancer.
- Wilhelm Georg Berger, 63, Romanian composer, violist and conductor.
- Solomon J. Buchsbaum, 63, Polish-American physicist, multiple myeloma.
- Billy Eckstine, 78, American jazz musician, stroke.
- Vincent Salazard, 84, French racing cyclist.
- Berent Schwineköper, 80, German archivist and historian.
- Johannes Türn, 93, Estonian chess player.
- Rens Vis, 88, Dutch football player and Olympian (1928).
- Carl A. Youngdale, 80, American Marine Corps major general.

=== 9 ===
- Bob Crosby, 79, American singer, actor, and television host (The Bob Crosby Show), cancer.
- Norveig Karlsen, 70, Norwegian Olympic gymnast (1952).
- Jan Larsen, 47, Danish football (soccer) player.
- C. Northcote Parkinson, 83, British naval historian.
- Pavel Pavlenko, 90, Soviet stage and film actor.
- Wells Root, 92, American screenwriter (The Prisoner of Zenda).
- Vanya Voynova, 58, Bulgarian basketball player.
- Edwin Vásquez, 70, Peruvian sport shooter and Olympic champion (1948).
- Harry Wright, 73, American football player and coach.
- Max August Zorn, 86, German-born American mathematician.

=== 10 ===
- Michał Antuszewicz, 83, Polish Olympic ice hockey player (1952).
- Dino Bravo, 44, American professional wrestler, shot.
- David Gunn, 47, American abortion care provider, murdered.
- Camille Howard, 78, American pianist and singer.
- Vladimir Suteev, 89, Russian author, artist and animator.
- Jerry Watford, 62, American football player (Chicago Cardinals).
- Guido Wieland, 86, Austrian stage, film and television actor.

=== 11 ===
- Tibor Donner, 85, Hungarian-Australian architect.
- Manuel da Fonseca, 81, Portuguese writer.
- Myrtle Maclagan, 81, English cricket player.
- Pragyananda Mahasthavir, 92, Nepalese buddhist monk.
- Stefania Reindl, 71, Polish gymnast and Olympian (1952).
- Irene Ware, 82, American actress.

=== 12 ===
- Iuliu Bodola, 81, Romanian-Hungarian football player.
- Lonnie Frisbee, 43, American evangelist and mystic, AIDS-related complications.
- Syed Shahid Hamid, 82, Pakistan Army general.
- Habib Jalib, 64, Pakistani revolutionary poet, and activist.
- Michael Kanin, 83, American screenwriter (Woman of the Year, Teacher's Pet), Oscar winner (1943), heart failure.
- Annamalai Ramanathan, 46, Indian mathematician, complications from a heart attack.
- Alex Taylor, 46, American singer.
- June Valli, 64, American singer and television personality, cancer.
- Wang Zhen, 84, Chinese general and politician, vice president (since 1988).

=== 13 ===
- Claire Huchet Bishop, 94, Swiss-American children's writer and librarian.
- Rocky Dzidzornu, 58, Ghanaian percussionist.
- Gene Hartley, 67, American racecar driver.
- Gaetano Kanizsa, 79, Italian psychologist and artist.
- Albert Maori Kiki, 61, Papua New Guinea politician.
- Pat Marcy, 79, Italian-American political boss.
- Petar Mazev, 66, Macedonian academic painter.
- Henry Morris, 73, Scottish football player.
- Dan Morrison, 61, American Olympic sailor (1976).
- Jean Tamini, 73, Swiss football player.
- Ann Way, 77, English film and television actress.
- Joe Wiley, 74, American baseball player.

=== 14 ===
- Dick Arrington, 51, American football player, heart attack.
- Marcus Bartley, 75, Anglo-Indian cinematographer.
- Larz Bourne, 77, American cartoon writer.
- Ahmad Ebadi, 87, Iranian musician and setar player.
- Thore Enochsson, 84, Swedish Olympic runner (1936).
- Sergio Manente, 68, Italian football player and coach.
- Harold Soref, 76, English politician, MP (1970–1974).
- Albert Watson II, 84, American Army lieutenant general.

=== 15 ===
- Georgette Chen, 86, Singaporean painter.
- Pat Cooper, 75, American baseball player (Philadelphia Athletics).
- Paul Easterling, 87, American baseball player (Detroit Tigers, Philadelphia Athletics).
- Ricardo Arias Espinosa, 80, Panamanian politician, president (1955–1956).
- Ron Hansen, 61, American football player (Washington Redskins).
- Gustav A. Hedlund, 88, American mathematician.
- Lennart Hyland, 73, Swedish TV-show host and journalist.
- Edo Kovačević, 86, Croatian artist.
- Karl Mai, 64, German football player and manager, leukemia.

=== 16 ===
- Natália Correia, 69, Portuguese intellectual, poet and social activist, heart attack.
- Johnny Cymbal, 48, Scottish-American songwriter, singer and record producer.
- Gordon Donaldson, 79, Scottish historian.
- Ralph Fults, 82, American outlaw (Barrow Gang).
- Srirangam Gopalaratnam, 53–54, Indian singer.
- Muhammad Khan Junejo, 60, Pakistani politician, prime minister (1985–1988), leukemia.
- Donald Randolph, 87, American actor, pneumonia.
- Chishū Ryū, 88, Japanese actor.
- Giovanni Testori, 69, Italian dramatist.
- Erich Valentin, 86, German musicologist.
- Odiel Van Den Meersschaut, 73, Belgian racing cyclist.
- Allan White, 77, English cricketer.

=== 17 ===
- Joe Abreu, 79, American baseball player (Cincinnati Reds).
- Constantin Anton, 98, Romanian general.
- Helen Hayes, 92, American actress (The Sin of Madelon Claudet, Airport, Happy Birthday), Oscar winner (1932, 1971), congestive heart failure.
- Charlotte Hughes, 115, English supercentenarian.
- Alby Pannam, 78, Australian footballer.
- John Joyce Russell, 95, American Roman Catholic prelate.
- Thorstein Treholt, 81, Norwegian politician, county governor of Oppland (1976–1981).
- John Witte, 60, American gridiron football player, leukemia.
- Skip Young, 63, American actor (The Adventures of Ozzie and Harriet).

=== 18 ===
- William K. Boardman, 78, American politician, member of the Alaska House of Representatives (1961–1971).
- Kenneth E. Boulding, 83, English-American economist.
- Elemér Gyetvai, 65, Hungarian table tennis player.
- Edward Warburton Jones, 80, Northern Irish judge and politician.
- Buck Jordan, 86, American baseball player.
- Henrik Lubbers, 66, American Olympic field hockey player (1948)
- Aksel Nikolajsen, 92, Danish Olympic pole vaulter (1928)).
- Carlos A. Petit, 80, Argentine screenwriter.
- Syvasky Poyner, 36, American convicted murderer, execution by electric chair.
- Robert A. Rushworth, 68, American general, pilot, and astronaut, heart attack.
- Joe Taylor, 67, American baseball player.

=== 19 ===
- Bernie Crimmins, 73, American football player (Green Bay Packers) and coach (Indiana Hoosiers).
- Karen Dalton, 55, American folk blues musician, laryngeal cancer.
- Georges Garvarentz, 60, Armenian-French composer.
- Bruce Gotz, 79, Australian rules footballer.
- Dulcie Howes, 84, South African ballet dancer, and choreographer.
- Mark Hughes, 60, English politician, MP (1970–1987).
- Al McWilliams, 77, American comics artist.
- Gerhard Mertins, 73, German paratrooper during World War II, nazi and arms trafficker.
- Roger Michelot, 80, French Olympic boxer (1932, 1936).
- Henrik Sandberg, 77, Danish film producer.
- Jeff Ward, 30, American drummer (Nine Inch Nails), suicide by carbon monoxide poisoning.

=== 20 ===
- Hans Christian Andersen, 79, Danish Olympic equestrian (1952, 1956).
- Arsène Auguste, 42, Haitian footballer, heart attack.
- Naseer Bunda, 60, Pakistani Olympic field hockey player (1956, 1960).
- Robert Burnham, Jr., 61, American astronomer.
- Spomenko Gostić, 14, Bosnian Serb soldier.
- Børge Jessen, 85, Danish mathematician.
- Polykarp Kusch, 82, German-American physicist, Nobel Prize recipient (1955).
- Rachel Messerer, 91, Russian silent film actress.
- Vivekananda Mukhopadhyaya, 89, Indian writer of Bengali literature.
- Gerard Sekoto, 79, South African artist and musician.
- Toni Spiss, 62, Austrian Olympic alpine skier (1952).

=== 21 ===
- Sebastiano Baggio, 79, Italian Catholic cardinal.
- Charles Dauner, 81, American Olympic handball player (1936).
- Rune Emanuelsson, 69, Swedish Olympic footballer (1948).
- Eric Guerin, 68, American jockey.
- Michael Hutchison, 79, Scottish politician.
- Akio Kaminaga, 56, Japanese judoka and Olympian (1964), colorectal cancer.
- Cyril Kellett, 55, English rugby league player.
- Fred Phillips, 84, American make-up artist (Star Trek).
- Albert Ramon, 72, Belgian racing cyclist.
- Buddy Swan, 63, American child actor.
- Digby Tatham-Warter, 75, British Army officer.
- Walther Wüst, 91, German Indologist.

=== 22 ===
- Samiha Ayverdi, 87, Turkish writer and Sufi mystic.
- John J. Beck, 93, American politician.
- Phia Berghout, 83, Dutch harpist.
- Enzo Fiermonte, 84, Italian actor and boxer.
- Leopold Labedz, 73, Anglo-Polish anti-Soviet Unioncommentator.
- Sun Meiying, 61, Chinese table tennis player.
- Steve Olin, 27, American baseball player (Cleveland Indians), boating accident.
- Vazir Orujov, 36, Azerbaijani soldier, killed in action.
- Gret Palucca, 91, German ballet dancer and dance teacher.
- Cec Pepper, 76, Australian cricket player, heart disease.
- Jack Riley, 83, American football player (Boston Redskins) and Olympic wrestler (1932).
- Franklin Delano Williams, 45, American gospel singer (The Williams Brothers), heart attack.

=== 23 ===
- Denis Parsons Burkitt, 82, Irish surgeon.
- Tim Crews, 31, American baseball player (Los Angeles Dodgers), boating accident.
- Robert Crichton, 68, American novelist.
- Bruce Alexander McDonald, 68, Australian Army officer.
- Yevdokiya Nikulina, 75, Soviet bomber commander and Hero of the Soviet Union.
- László Pákozdi, 76, Hungarian-born Chilean footballer.
- Torsten Rapp, 87, Swedish Air Force officer.
- Hans Werner Richter, 84, German writer.

=== 24 ===
- Albert Arlen, 88, Australian pianist.
- Alice Bacon, Baroness Bacon, 83, British politician.
- Imogen Carpenter, 81, American actress, musician, and composer.
- József Dobronyi, 75, Hungarian Olympic athlete (1952).
- José dos Santos Ferreira, 73, Macanese poet.
- Karen Gershon, 69, German-British writer and poet.
- Tolman Gibson, 50, American Olympic boxer (1964).
- Robert Harris, 41–42, Australian poet, heart attack.
- John Hersey, 78, American journalist and novelist (Hiroshima, A Bell for Adano), cancer.
- Mike O'Neill, 64, American basketball player (Milwaukee Hawks).
- Anton Peterlin, 84, Slovenian physicist.
- Herbert Tenzer, 87, American politician, member of the United States House of Representatives (1965-1969).

=== 25 ===
- Bogdan Istru, 78, Moldovan poet.
- Wally Karbo, 77, American professional wrestling promoter, heart attack.
- Jack Lancaster, 73, Australian rules footballer.
- Jake Porter, 76, American jazz trumpeter and record producer.
- Dave Strong, 76-77, American football player and coach of football and basketball.
- Rokkō Toura, 62, Japanese actor.
- Billy Wilson, 65, Australian rugby player and coach.

=== 26 ===
- Tofiq Bahramov, 68, Soviet and Azerbaijani football player and referee.
- James Caleb Boggs, 83, American lawyer and politician.
- Louis Falco, 50, American choreographer, AIDS.
- Reuben Fine, 78, American chess player, psychologist, and author.
- Lewis Hanke, 88, American historian of colonial Latin America.
- Edwin Norton, 67, New Zealand weightlifter.
- Roy Riegels, 84, American football player (California Golden Bears), Parkinson's disease.
- Anatoli Yatskov, 79, Soviet consul and intelligence officer during World War II.

=== 27 ===
- Peter Agostini, 80, American sculptor.
- Kamal Hassan Ali, 71, Egyptian politician, prime minister (1984–1985).
- Charles Anderson, 78, American Olympic equestrian (1948).
- Ahmed El-Hamy El-Husseini, 54, Egyptian Olympic fencer (1960, 1964, 1968).
- Clarence Jaquith, 97, American Olympic triple jumper (1920).
- Clifford Jordan, 61, American saxophonist, lung cancer.
- Arthur Larson, 82, American lawyer, writer, and government official.
- Paul László, 93, Hungarian-American architect and interior designer.
- Elizabeth Holloway Marston, 100, American attorney and psychologist.
- Taško Načić, 58, Serbian actor.
- Kate Reid, 62, Canadian actress (Atlantic City, Death of a Salesman, Dallas), cancer.
- Ken Seymour, 62, Australian rules footballer.
- Ernst Streng, 51, German Olympic cyclist (1964).

=== 28 ===
- Scott Cunningham, 36, American Wicca writer, lymphoma.
- Ray Flanigan, 70, American baseball player (Cleveland Indians).
- Miklós Horthy, 86, Hungarian noble and politician.
- Patrick Lawlor, 69, Canadian politician.
- Michael McNair-Wilson, 62, British politician.
- Italo Tajo, 77, Italian opera singer.

=== 29 ===
- Anton Krenn, 81, Austrian Olympic footballer (1936).
- Sir John Rodgers, 1st Baronet, 86, British politician.
- Juan Luis Martínez, 50, Chilean avant-garde poet, writer, and visual artist, heart attack.
- Chuck Reichow, 92, American football player.
- Štefan Uher, 62, Slovak film director, heart failure.
- Jack Stelling, 68, English footballer.

=== 30 ===
- Andrée Brunet, 91, French-American Olympic ice skater (1924, 1928, 1932).
- Richard Diebenkorn, 70, American painter, emphysema.
- Athanasios Ragazos, 79, Greek long-distance runner and Olympian (1948).
- Rubén Rojo, 70, Spanish-Mexican actor, cardiovascular disease.
- Pedro Tinoco, 65, Venezuelan businessman and politician, Minister of Finance (1969–1972) and President of the Central Bank (1989–1992).
- Paolo Todeschini, 72, Italian football player and manager.

=== 31 ===
- Ramon Aquino, 75, Filipino Chief Justice of the Supreme Court.
- Robert Brookson, 53, Canadian Olympic rower (1964).
- Chicháy, 75, Filipino comedian and actress.
- Jimmie Crutchfield, 83, American baseball player.
- Ailwyn Fellowes, 3rd Baron de Ramsey, 83, English hereditary peer.
- Manuel Gonzales, 80, Spanish-American comics artist (Disney), heart failure.
- Brandon Lee, 28, American actor (The Crow, Rapid Fire, Showdown in Little Tokyo), accidental gunshot wound.
- José María Lemus, 81, Salvadorian politician, president (1956–1960), Hodgkin's lymphoma.
- Chip Mead, 43, American racing driver, plane crash.
- Joe Muha, 71, American football player (Philadelphia Eagles), coach, and official.
- Mitchell Parish, 92, American lyricist.
- Rezső Riheczky, 59-60, Hungarian Olympic rower (1952, 1956).
- George Roark, 94, American basketball, baseball, and football player and coach.
- Hüseyin Saygun, 72-73, Turkish football player, manager, and Olympian (1948).
- Angie Xtravaganza, 28, American transgender entertainer, complications from AIDS.
