= Deaths in September 1993 =

The following is a list of notable deaths in September 1993.

Entries for each day are listed alphabetically by surname. A typical entry lists information in the following sequence:

- Name, age, country of citizenship at birth, subsequent country of citizenship (if applicable), reason for notability, cause of death (if known), and reference.

== September 1993 ==
=== 1 ===
- Hasan Abdullayev, 75, Soviet and Azerbaijani physicist and academic.
- Thomas Brodie, 89, British Army officer.
- Odell M. Conoley, 79, American Marine Corps brigadier general.
- Fritz Cremer, 86, German sculptor.
- Hüseyin Gürsoy, 58–59, Turkish Olympic wrestler (1968).
- Hew Lorimer, 86, Scottish sculptor.
- Bernie Lowe, 75, American musician.
- Neon Park, 52, American painter, comics artist and illustrator, ALS.
- Michael Sobell, 100, British businessman, philanthropist, and thoroughbred racehorses owner.
- Aleksey Vakhonin, 58, Russian weightlifter and Olympic champion (1964), injuries sustained during brawl.

=== 2 ===
- Eric Berry, 80, British actor, cancer.
- Reg Cantelon, 90, Canadian politician, member of the House of Commons of Canada (1963–1968).
- Dragotin Cvetko, 81, Slovenian composer and musicologist.
- Carl Anthony Fisher, 47, American Roman Catholic prelate, colorectal cancer.
- Fernando Lapuente, 65, Argentine Olympic sprinter (1948).
- Ingvar Moe, 56, Norwegian poet, novelist and children's writer.
- Russel B. Nye, 80, American professor of English and Pulitzer Prize winner.

=== 3 ===
- Eric Batten, 79, English rugby player.
- David Brown, 89, English industrialist.
- Keith Chamberlain, 80, Australian rules footballer.
- Josep Maria de Porcioles i Colomer, 89, Spanish politician and mayor of Barcelona, heart attack.
- Don Corbitt, 69, American gridiron football player (Washington Redskins).
- Lionel Fournier, 76, Canadian Olympic athlete (1948).
- Wakasegawa Taiji, 73, Japanese sumo wrestler.

=== 4 ===
- Tommy Cheadle, 74, English football player.
- Haydn Davies, 81, Welsh cricketer.
- Baltasar Lobo, 83, Spanish artist, anarchist and sculptor.
- Semyon Marushkin, 74, Soviet Russian Olympic wrestler (1952).
- Johnny Rae, 59, American jazz drummer and vibraphonist.
- Hervé Villechaize, 50, French-American actor (Fantasy Island, The Man with the Golden Gun, Airplane II: The Sequel) and painter, suicide.
- Aaron Wildavsky, 63, American political scientist, lung cancer.

=== 5 ===
- Baek Du-jin, 84, South Korean politician and Prime Minister of South Korea.
- Samim Kocagöz, 77, Turkish novelist.
- Sam Lieberman, 71, American basketball player (Syracuse Nationals).
- Edwin Malindine, 83, British politician.
- Virgilio Mortari, 90, Italian composer and teacher.
- Fernand Payette, 72, Canadian Olympic wrestler (1948).
- Claude Renoir, 79, French cinematographer.
- John Truscott, 57, Australian actor and production- and costume designer, complications during heart surgery.

=== 6 ===
- Pete Bennett, 65, Canadian football player.
- Howard Easterling, 81, American baseball player.
- Kevin Fox, 75, Australian rules footballer.
- Bjarne Liller, 57, Danish jazz musician, singer-songwriter, and actor.
- A. L. F. Rivet, 77, British archaeologist and cartographer.
- Paul Arthur Schilpp, 96, German-American philosopher and educator.

=== 7 ===
- Eugen Barbu, 69, Romanian writer and journalist.
- Hall Bartlett, 70, American film producer, director, and screenwriter.
- Jean-Pierre Büchler, 85, Luxembourgish politician.
- Lefty Dizz, 56, American chicago blues guitarist and singer, esophageal cancer.
- Bruno Giorgi, 88, Brazilian sculptor.
- Christian Metz, 61, French film theorist, suicide.
- Guy Overton, 74, New Zealand cricketer.
- John Weld Peck II, 80, American judge.
- Ted Whitfield, 77, Australian rules footballer.
- Gábor Zsiborás, 35, Hungarian footballer.

=== 8 ===
- Vincent Dethier, 78, American physiologist and entomologist.
- Santiago Goicoechea, 88, Spanish Olympic field hockey player (1928).
- Peter Higgins, 64, British athlete and Olympic medalist (1956).
- Zaki Naguib Mahmoud, 88, Egyptian intellectual and philosopher.
- Earl Mattingly, 88, American baseball player (Brooklyn Robins).
- Tor Skjønsberg, 90, Norwegian resistance leader during World War II.

=== 9 ===
- Jimmy Deuchar, 63, Scottish jazz trumpeter and big band arranger.
- Art Mooney, 80, American singer and bandleader.
- Helen O'Connell, 73, American big band singer and actress, liver cancer.
- David Tendlar, 84, American animator.

=== 10 ===
- Garnet Ault, 87, Canadian swimmer and Olympic medalist (1928).
- Nicholas Bayard Dill, 87, Bermudian politician and military officer, heart attack.
- Julien Freund, 72, French sociologist and philosopher.
- Hajime Hana, 63, Japanese actor.
- Charles Harris, 79, American tennis player.
- Cal Howard, 82, American cartoon story artist and animator.
- Rita Karin, 73, Polish-American actress (Sophie's Choice).
- Meinrad Miltenberger, 68, German sprint canoer and Olympian (1952, 1956).
- Josef Odložil, 54, Czech middle-distance runner and Olympic medalist (1964, 1968), complications after fight.
- Krister Wickman, 69, Swedish politician.

=== 11 ===
- Erling Andersen, 88, Norwegian-born American Olympic cross-country skier (1932).
- Dino, 91, Brazilian footballer.
- Luis Antonio Escobar, 68, Colombian composer and musicologist.
- Antoine Izméry, Haitian businessman and pro-democracy activist, shot.
- Charles Lamont, 98, American filmmaker, pneumonia.
- Erich Leinsdorf, 81, Austrian-born American conductor.
- Mary Jane Reoch, 48, American cycling champion, road accident.
- Les Scollard, 85, Australian rules footballer.

=== 12 ===
- Charlie Bray, 95, English cricketer and journalist.
- Raymond Burr, 76, Canadian-American actor (Perry Mason, Rear Window, Ironside), Emmy winner (1959, 1961), kidney cancer.
- Hitendra Kanaiyalal Desai, 78, Indian politician.
- Baligh Hamdi, 61, Egyptian composer, liver disease.
- Granny Hamner, 66, American Major League Baseball player (Philadelphia Phillies, Cleveland Indians, Kansas City Athletics).
- Harold Innocent, 60, English actor (Henry V, Robin Hood: Prince of Thieves, Buster).
- Edith Kiel, 89, German film producer, screenwriter, and director.
- Walter Ganshof van der Meersch, 93, Belgian jurist, politician, and Olympic bobsledder (1928).

=== 13 ===
- Austregésilo de Athayde, 94, Brazilian writer and journalist.
- Gordon Bourne, 80, Australian cricketer.
- Karl Ehrenbolger, 93, Swiss Olympic footballer (1924).
- Steve Jordan, 74, American jazz guitarist.
- Pavel Kouba, 55, Czech football player.
- Yasushi Sasaki, 85, Japanese film director.
- Carl Voss, 86, American ice hockey player.

=== 14 ===
- Adrianne Allen, 86, English stage actress, cancer.
- Bill Atwood, 81, American baseball player (Philadelphia Phillies).
- Geo Bogza, 85, Romanian avant-garde theorist, poet, and journalist.
- Erling Asbjørn Kongshaug, 78, Norwegian rifle shooter and Olympic champion (1952, 1956, 1960).
- Sheelagh Murnaghan, 69, Northern Irish politician.
- Bruno Schlokat, 95, German Olympic javelin thrower (1928).
- Glenn E. Smiley, 83, American clergyman and civil rights leader.
- Peter Tranchell, 71, British composer.
- Solange Térac, 86, French screenwriter and film director.

=== 15 ===
- Ethan Allen, 89, American baseball player.
- Maurice Allingham, 97, Australian rules football player.
- Pino Puglisi, 56, Italian Roman Catholic priest, killed by the mafia.
- Yulian Semyonov, 61, Soviet and Russian writer, scriptwriter and poet.
- Shinsaku Tsukawaki, 62, Japanese Olympic gymnast (1956).
- Maurice Yaméogo, 71, President of Republic of Upper Volta (1959–1966).

=== 16 ===
- Merv Bolger, 74, Australian rules footballer.
- István Grózner, 38, Hungarian Olympic equestrian (1980).
- František Jílek, 80, Czech conductor, composer and pianist.
- Sid Kuller, 82, American comedy writer, producer and composer.
- Henri LaBorde, 84, American discus thrower and Olympian (1932).
- Max Marshall, 79, American baseball player (Cincinnati Reds).
- Emil Møller, 88, Danish footballer.
- J. R. Monterose, 66, American jazz saxophonist.
- Oodgeroo Noonuccal, 72, Aboriginal Australian political activist and artist.
- Vera Orlova, 75, Soviet and Russian actress.
- Rok Petrovič, 27, Yugoslav and Slovenian alpine skier and Olympian (1988), drowned.
- Jim Staton, 66, American football player (Washington Redskins).

=== 17 ===
- Thomas Robert Shannon Broughton, 93, Canadian classical scholar and Latin prosopographer.
- Pete Elko, 75, American baseball player (Chicago Cubs).
- James Griffith, 77, American actor, musician and screenwriter, cancer.
- Jon Jelacic, 56, American gridiron football player (New York Giants, Oakland Raiders).
- Willie Mosconi, 80, American pool player, heart attack.
- Christian Nyby, 80, American film director (The Thing from Another World).
- Tarzie Vittachi, 71, Sri Lankan journalist, liver cancer.

=== 18 ===
- Aris Konstantinidis, 80, Greek modernist architect.
- Henrietta Leaver, 77, American beauty pageant contestant, cancer.
- Hans Schwarzenbach, 80, Swiss equestrian and Olympic medalist (1952, 1960).
- Asit Sen, 76, Indian Hindi film director and comedian.

=== 19 ===
- Helen Adam, 83, Scottish poet, collagist and photographer.
- Art Burris, 69, American basketball player (Fort Wayne Pistons, Milwaukee Hawks).
- John E. Dimon, 77, American politician.
- Marcel Mariën, 73, Belgian artist and filmmaker, cancer.
- András Mihály, 75, Hungarian cellist, composer and academic teacher.
- Moses Simwala, 44, Zambian footballer, coach and Olympian (1980).
- John Tavener, 72, American college football player (Indiana Hoosiers).
- Mufti Muhammad Waqaruddin, 78, Pakistani Islamic scholar.
- Frank Wurm, 69, American baseball player (Brooklyn Dodgers).

=== 20 ===
- Edwin Blunt, 75, English football player.
- Erich Hartmann, 71, German fighter pilot and most successful fighter ace during World War II, brain cancer.
- Zlatko Mašek, 64, Yugoslav Olympic sports shooter (1952, 1956).
- Leonard Parkin, 64, British television journalist and newscaster, cancer.
- Hans Suess, 83, Austrian physicist.
- Cyrus Leo Sulzberger II, 80, American journalist, diarist, and non-fiction writer.
- John P. Vukasin Jr., 65, American district judge (United States District Court for the Northern District of California).

=== 21 ===
- John H. Comstock, 89, American politician from Nebraska.
- Joe Daher, 80, American college basketball and football coach.
- John Goodell, 86, American baseball player (Chicago White Sox).
- Sverre Johannessen, 72, Norwegian Olympic alpine skier (1948, 1952).
- Fernand Ledoux, 96, Belgian-French film and theatre actor.
- Antonio Quintana Simonetti, 74, Cuban modernist architect.
- Francis Weldon, 80, British equestrian and Olympic champion (1956, 1960).

=== 22 ===
- Maurice Abravanel, 90, Greek-born American conductor.
- Emilio Botín, 90, Spanish banker.
- Niklaus Meienberg, 53, Swiss writer and investigative journalist, suicide.
- Mihai Tänzer, 88, Romanian football player and Olympian (1924).

=== 23 ===
- Tommy Bogan, 73, Scottish football player.
- William Cort, 57, American actor, cancer.
- Myer Galpern, 90, Scottish politician.
- Koichi Hirakida, 55, Japanese swimmer and Olympic medalist (1960).
- Charles Loughlin, 79, British politician.
- Keith Marshall, 86, Australian rules footballer.

=== 24 ===
- Ian Stuart Donaldson, 36, English neo-Nazi musician and frontman of punk rock band Skrewdriver, car crash.
- Izzy Goldstein, 85, American baseball player (Detroit Tigers).
- Zita Johann, 89, Austrian-American actress.
- Mike Kabealo, 77, American football player (Cleveland Rams).
- Wilhelm Marais, 85, South African cricket player and umpire.
- Bruno Pontecorvo, 80, Italian and Soviet nuclear physicist, Parkinson's disease.
- Tamara Talbot Rice, 89, Russian-English art historian.
- Alfred Wróbel, 65, Polish ice hockey player and Olympian (1952, 1956).

=== 25 ===
- Willy Fitz, 75, Austrian football player and coach.
- Francis Raymond Fosberg, 85, American botanist.
- John Moores, 97, English businessman, politician and philanthropist.
- Scoop Posewitz, 85, American basketball player.
- Rudolf Rasmussen, 75, Danish Olympic cyclist (1948).
- Manlio Scopigno, 67, Italian football player and coach, heart attack.

=== 26 ===
- Nina Berberova, 92, Russian writer, fall.
- Frank Dunlap, 69, Canadian football and ice hockey player (Toronto Maple Leafs).
- Bernie Finn, 86, American football player (Chicago Cardinals).
- Semyon Pavlovich Ivanov, 86, Soviet general and Hero of the Soviet Union.
- Edith Meiser, 95, American author and actress.
- Bernie Naylor, 70, Australian rules footballer.
- John Pennel, 53, American pole vaulter, Olympian (1964, 1968), and world record holder, cancer.

=== 27 ===
- Paolo Caldarella, 29, Italian Olympic water polo player (1988, 1992), motorcycle accident.
- Lin Clugston, 85, Irish cricketer.
- Jimmy Doolittle, 96, American military general, aviation pioneer and recipient of the Medal of Honor.
- Fraser MacPherson, 65, Canadian jazz musician.
- Milan Muškatirović, 59, Yugoslav water polo goalkeeper and Olympian (1960, 1964).
- Thomas White, 78, Canadian Olympic speed skater (1936).
- Notable people killed during the Sukhumi massacre
  - Mamia Alasania, 50, Georgian Armed Forces colonel
  - Alexander Berulava, 47, Georgian journalist, writer, and human rights activist
  - Raul Eshba, 49, Georgian politician
  - Guram Gabiskiria, 46, Georgian politician and mayor of Sukhumi
  - Zhiuli Shartava, 49, Georgian politician and Prime Minister of Abkhazia
  - Andrey Soloviev, 39, Soviet and Russian war photographer

=== 28 ===
- Peter De Vries, 83, American editor and novelist.
- Chandrashekhar Dubey, 69, Indian actor and radio personality.
- Paul Giguet, 78, French racing cyclist.
- Crawford Greenewalt, 91, American chemical engineer, stroke.
- Galina Makarova, 73, Soviet and Belarusian theater and film actress.
- Dumitru Pavlovici, 81, Romanian football player.
- Jack Richardson, 86, Australian rules footballer.

=== 29 ===
- Matej Bor, 80, Slovenian writer.
- Ian Burn, 53, Australian conceptual artist, drowned.
- Gordon Douglas, 85, American film director and actor, cancer.
- Tatjana Gsovsky, 92, German ballet dancer and choreographer.
- Eugenio Pagnini, 88, Italian Olympic pentathlete (1928, 1932).
- Moses Simwala, 44, Zambian football player and coach.
- Ghulam Haider Wyne, 43, Pakistani politician, murdered.

=== 30 ===
- Ronnie Aldrich, 77, British easy listening and jazz musician, prostate cancer.
- Jean Brun, 67, Swiss Olympic cyclist (1948).
- Dick Harris, 81, Australian rules football player and coach.
- Alex Lyon, 61, British politician, Alzheimer's disease.
- Carlo Vinci, 87, American animator.
