= 1993 in film =

The year 1993 in film involved many major film events, including the blockbuster hits Jurassic Park, The Fugitive, and Mrs. Doubtfire. Krzysztof Kieślowski's Three Colours: Blue launched the Three Colours trilogy.

== Highest-grossing films ==
The top 10 films released in 1993 by worldwide gross are as follows:

Highest-grossing films of 1993
Rank	Title	Distributor	Worldwide gross
1	Jurassic Park	Universal	$912,667,947
2	Mrs. Doubtfire	20th Century Fox	$441,286,195
3	The Fugitive	Warner Bros.	$368,875,760
4	Schindler's List	Universal	$321,306,305
5	The Firm	Paramount	$270,248,367
6	Indecent Proposal	Paramount	$266,614,059
7	Cliffhanger	TriStar	$255,000,211
8	Sleepless in Seattle	TriStar	$227,799,884
9	Philadelphia	TriStar	$206,678,440
10	The Pelican Brief	Warner Bros.	$195,268,056

== Events ==
- January 1 – China Film Import & Export Corporation ends its 40-year monopoly distributing all films in China, with 16 other Chinese film studios now responsible for distributing their own films.
- January 29 – Bram Stoker's Dracula opens in the United Kingdom setting an opening weekend record of £2,633,635 million.
- February – In order to create special effects for his own films, James Cameron, alongside Stan Winston and Scott Ross, forms Digital Domain.
- March 31 – Actor Brandon Lee is accidentally killed during the filming of The Crow.
- April 7 – Adrian Lyne's controversial film Indecent Proposal opens in theaters.
- May 27 – Actress Kim Basinger files for bankruptcy after a California judge initially orders her to pay $8.9 million for refusing to honor a verbal contract to star in the film Boxing Helena. As a result, Basinger loses the town that she purchased in 1989, Braselton, Georgia, to her partner in the deal, the pension fund of Chicago-based Ameritech.
- May 28 – Produced by Hollywood Pictures, Super Mario Bros. opens, marking the first video game film released, starring Bob Hoskins as Mario and John Leguizamo as Luigi. The film would end up grossing only $20.9 million domestically and was universally panned from critics.
- June 11 – The filmed version of Michael Crichton's novel Jurassic Park, a dinosaur epic with groundbreaking special effects directed by Steven Spielberg, breaks box-office records with a record $50 million opening weekend and goes on to become the highest-grossing film ever made with a worldwide gross of over $900 million.
- June 18 – Arnold Schwarzenegger's film career falters with the commercial disappointment of Last Action Hero.
- July 16 – Jurassic Park opens in Mexico and the United Kingdom and on July 17 in Japan, South Korea and Taiwan, setting opening records in each market.
- October 31 – Actor River Phoenix accidentally dies of an overdose during the filming of Dark Blood. The film was later completed and released in 2012.
- December 15 – Schindler's List, directed by Steven Spielberg, is released and goes on to win seven Academy Awards including Best Picture and Spielberg's first for Best Director.
- December 22 – Turner Broadcasting System acquired Castle Rock Entertainment.

== Awards ==
Category/Organization	51st Golden Globe Awards January 22, 1994		66th Academy Awards March 21, 1994	47th BAFTA Awards April 14, 1994
Category/Organization	Drama	Musical or Comedy	66th Academy Awards March 21, 1994	47th BAFTA Awards April 14, 1994
Best Film	Schindler's List	Mrs. Doubtfire	Schindler's List	
Best Director	Steven Spielberg; Schindler's List			
Best Actor	Tom Hanks; Philadelphia	Robin Williams; Mrs. Doubtfire	Tom Hanks; Philadelphia	Anthony Hopkins; The Remains of the Day
Best Actress	Holly Hunter; The Piano	Angela Bassett; What's Love Got to Do with It	Holly Hunter; The Piano	
Best Supporting Actor	Tommy Lee Jones; The Fugitive			Ralph Fiennes; Schindler's List
Best Supporting Actress	Winona Ryder; The Age of Innocence		Anna Paquin; The Piano	Miriam Margolyes; The Age of Innocence
Best Screenplay, Adapted	Steven Zaillian; Schindler's List		Steven Zaillian; Schindler's List	
Best Screenplay, Original	Steven Zaillian; Schindler's List		Jane Campion; The Piano	Danny Rubin; Groundhog Day
Best Original Score	Heaven & Earth; Kitarō		Schindler's List; John Williams	
Best Original Song	"Streets of Philadelphia"; Philadelphia			N/A
Best Foreign Language Film	Farewell My Concubine		Belle Epoque	Farewell My Concubine

Palme d'Or (Cannes Film Festival):

Farewell My Concubine, directed by Chen Kaige, Hong Kong
The Piano, directed by Jane Campion, New Zealand / Australia / France

Golden Lion (Venice Film Festival):

Short Cuts, directed by Robert Altman, United States
Three Colours: Blue, directed by Krzysztof Kieślowski, France / Poland

Golden Bear (Berlin Film Festival):

The Wedding Banquet, directed by Ang Lee, Taiwan / United States
Woman Sesame Oil Maker (Xiāng hún nǚ), directed by Xie Fei, China

People's Choice Award (Toronto International Film Festival):

The Snapper, directed by Stephen Frears, United Kingdom

== 1993 films ==
=== By country/region ===
- List of American films of 1993
- List of Argentine films of 1993
- List of Australian films of 1993
- List of Bangladeshi films of 1993
- List of British films of 1993
- List of Canadian films of 1993
- List of French films of 1993
- List of Hong Kong films of 1993
- List of Indian films of 1993
  - List of Hindi films of 1993
  - List of Kannada films of 1993
  - List of Malayalam films of 1993
  - List of Marathi films of 1993
  - List of Tamil films of 1993
  - List of Telugu films of 1993
- List of Japanese films of 1993
- List of Mexican films of 1993
- List of Pakistani films of 1993
- List of Russian films of 1993
- List of South Korean films of 1993
- List of Spanish films of 1993

=== By genre/medium ===
- List of action films of 1993
- List of animated feature films of 1993
- List of avant-garde films of 1993
- List of crime films of 1993
- List of comedy films of 1993
- List of drama films of 1993
- List of horror films of 1993
- List of science fiction films of 1993
- List of thriller films of 1993
- List of western films of 1993

== Births ==
- January 5 – Franz Drameh, English actor
- January 7 – Yuta Nakatsuka, Japanese actor and dancer
- January 9 – Ashley Argota, American actress
- January 10 – Jacob Scipio, English actor and writer
- January 11 – Flora Cross, French-American actress
- January 18 – Morgan York, American actress
- January 19 – Gus Lewis, American-English actor
- January 26 – Cameron Bright, Canadian actor
- January 27 – Iyana Halley, American actress
- January 28 – Will Poulter, English actor
- January 29 – Lewis Pullman, American actor
- February 7
  - David Dorfman, American actor
  - Philip Wiegratz, German former actor
- February 12 – Jennifer Stone, American actress
- February 13 – Sophie Evans, Welsh actress and singer
- February 14 – Shane Harper, American actor
- February 19 – Victoria Justice, American actress and singer
- February 21 – Masaki Suda, Japanese actor
- February 24 – Emily Rudd, American actress
- March 4
  - Jenna Boyd, American actress
  - Abigail Mavity, American actress
- March 11 – Jodie Comer, English actress
- March 15 – Alia Bhatt, British actress
- March 23 - Spencer Lord, Canadian actor
- March 29 – Joe Adler, American actor
- April 7 – Yell Htwe Aung, Burmese comedian, actor, and model (died 2018)
- April 10 – Sofia Carson, actress, singer and musician
- April 14
  - Vivien Cardone, American actress
  - Graham Phillips, American actor, filmmaker and singer
- April 26 – Ryoma Takeuchi, Japanese actor
- April 30 – Henry Zaga, Brazilian actor
- May 6 – Naomi Scott, English actress and singer
- May 8 - Bobbi Salvör Menuez, American actor
- May 10
  - Spencer Fox, American actor, singer and musician
  - Halston Sage, American actress
- May 11
  - Olivia Liang, American actress
  - James Reid, Filipino actor
- May 13 – Debby Ryan, American actress and singer
- May 14 – Miranda Cosgrove, American actress, singer
- May 29 – Maika Monroe, American actress
- June 7 – Amanda Leighton, American actress
- June 9 – Danielle Chuchran, American actress
- June 10 - Bria Vinaite, American actress
- June 11 – Sidhu Moose Wala, Indian singer, rapper and actor (died 2022)
- June 19 – KSI, British YouTuber, rapper and actor
- June 24 – Beanie Feldstein, American actress
- June 25 – Barney Clark, English actor
- June 26 – Ariana Grande, American actress, singer
- June 27 – Camila Queiroz, Brazilian actress
- June 29 – Harrison Gilbertson, Australian actor
- July 1 – Raini Rodriguez, American actress, singer
- July 3 – Sarah Wiedenheft, Dutch-American voice actress
- July 9 – Emily Hirst, Canadian actress
- July 23 – Lili Simmons, American actress
- July 24 - Brandon Wilson, American actor
- July 26
  - Elizabeth Gillies, American actress
  - Taylor Momsen, American actress
- July 31 – Christian Byers, Australian actor
- August 1 – Leon Thomas III, American actor, singer/songwriter, musician and dancer
- August 2 – Ryan and Kyle Pepi, American actors
- August 4 – Alan Shirahama, Japanese actor and DJ
- August 5 – Suzuka Ohgo, Japanese actress
- August 7 – Francesca Eastwood, American actress and television personality
- August 8 – Devery Jacobs, Canadian actress
- August 11 – Alyson Stoner, American actress
- August 12
  - Imani Hakim, American actress
  - Hannah Quinlivan, Taiwanese-Australian actress and model
- August 16 – Cameron Monaghan, American actor
- August 18 – Maia Mitchell, Australian actress, singer
- August 26 – Keke Palmer, American actress
- September 1 – Alexander Conti, Canadian actor
- September 18 – Patrick Schwarzenegger, American actor
- September 22 – Chase Ellison, American actor
- September 24 – Ben Platt, American actor
- September 25
  - Greg Davis, American actor
  - Zach Tyler Eisen, American former voice actor
- October 2 - Elizabeth McLaughlin, American actress
- October 8 – Angus T. Jones, American actor
- October 9 – Autumn Chiklis, American actress and writer
- October 23 - Callie Cooke, British actress
  - Taylor Spreitler, American actress
- October 25
  - Mia Goth, English actress
  - Bessie Carter, English actress
  - Rachel Matthews, American actress
  - Zeno Robinson, American voice actor
- October 29 – India Eisley, American actress
- October 30 – Brett Kelly, Canadian actor
- October 31 – Letitia Wright, Guyanese-British actress
- November 8 – Jak Knight, American actor, comedian and writer (died 2022)
- November 16 – Pete Davidson, American comedian and actor
- November 22 – Adèle Exarchopoulos, French actress
- November 24
  - Anthony De La Torre, American actor
  - Zoe Levin, American actress
- December 8 – AnnaSophia Robb, American actress
- December 10 – Alicia von Rittberg, German actress
- December 16 – Stephan James, Canadian actor
- December 17 – Kiersey Clemons, American actress
- December 19
  - Hermione Corfield, English actress
  - Nik Dodani, American actor, writer and comedian
- December 21 – Vanessa Angel, Indonesian actress, model and singer (died 2021)
- December 22 – Aliana Lohan, American actress
- December 24 – Millie Brady, English actress and model
- December 27 – Olivia Cooke, English actress

== Deaths ==
Month	Date	Name	Age	Country	Profession	Notable films
January	1	June Clayworth	70	US	Actress	Strange Wives; Dick Tracy Meets Gruesome
January	4	Leonard Kibrick	68	US	Actor	It's a Wonderful World; Dimples
January	6	Rudolf Nureyev	54	Russia	Dancer, Actor	Valentino; Exposed
January	14	Robert A. Mattey	82	US	Special Effects Artist	Jaws; The Absent-Minded Professor
January	15	Sammy Cahn	79	US	Songwriter	Three Coins in the Fountain; The Joker Is Wild
January	16	Glenn Corbett	59	US	Actor	The Crimson Kimono; Chisum
January	16	Florence Desmond	87	UK	Actress	Three Came Home; Gay Love
January	20	Joseph Anthony	80	US	Director	Career; All in a Night's Work
January	20	Audrey Hepburn	63	UK	Actress	Breakfast at Tiffany's; Roman Holiday
January	24	Don Bassman	64	US	Sound Engineer	Patton; Die Hard
January	27	André "the Giant" Roussimoff	46	France	Wrestler, Actor	The Princess Bride; Micki & Maude
January	28	John Steadman	83	US	Actor	The Longest Yard; The Hills Have Eyes
January	29	Gustav Hasford	45	US	Screenwriter	Full Metal Jacket
February	5	Roxanne Kernohan	32	Canada	Actress	Critters 2: The Main Course; Tango & Cash
February	5	Joseph L. Mankiewicz	83	US	Director, Screenwriter, Producer	All About Eve; Cleopatra
February	5	Tip Tipping	34	UK	Stuntman, Actor	Indiana Jones and the Last Crusade; Aliens
February	8	Douglas Heyes	73	US	Screenwriter, Director	Ice Station Zebra; Kitten with a Whip
February	9	Milos Kirek	46	US	Actor	The Final Conflict; Never Say Never Again
February	13	Willoughby Gray	76	UK	Actor	A View to a Kill; The Princess Bride
February	14	Lester Wilson	50	US	Choreographer	Saturday Night Fever; The Last Dragon
February	18	Ted Haworth	75	US	Art Director, Production Designer	Some Like It Hot; The Longest Day
February	18	Rita La Roy	91	US	Actress	Hold That Woman!; A Holy Terror
February	18	Leslie Norman	81	UK	Director	Dunkirk; X the Unknown
February	25	Mary Walter	80	Philippines	Actress	Oro, Plata, Mata; Shake, Rattle & Roll
February	26	Constance Ford	69	US	Actress	A Summer Place; House of Women
February	26	Arthur Maria Rabenalt	87	Austria	Director	That Won't Keep a Sailor Down; Big Request Concert
February	27	Lillian Gish	99	US	Actress	The Birth of a Nation; Duel in the Sun
February	28	Franco Brusati	70	Italy	Director, Screenwriter	To Forget Venice; Bread and Chocolate
February	28	Joyce Carey	94	UK	Actress	Blithe Spirit; Brief Encounter
February	28	Ishirō Honda	81	Japan	Director	Gojira; King Kong vs. Godzilla
February	28	Ruby Keeler	82	US	Actress, Dancer	42nd Street; Gold Diggers of 1933
March	2	Paul D. Zimmerman	54	US	Screenwriter	The King of Comedy; Lovers and Liars
March	4	Harper Goff	81	US	Art Director, Production Designer	The Vikings; Willy Wonka & the Chocolate Factory
March	4	Richard Sale	81	US	Screenwriter, Director	Torpedo Run; The White Buffalo
March	5	Asta Vihandi	63	Estonia	Actress, Singer	Mikhaylo Lomonosov; A Young Retiree
March	7	Patricia Lawrence	67	UK	Actress	A Room with a View; Howards End
March	9	Bob Crosby	79	US	Singer, Actor	The Five Pennies; Kansas City Kitty
March	11	Irene Ware	82	US	Actress	Chandu the Magician; The Raven
March	12	Michael Kanin	83	US	Screenwriter	Woman of the Year; Teacher's Pet
March	16	Donald Randolph	87	South Africa	Actor	Topaz; The Deadly Mantis
March	16	Chishū Ryū	88	Japan	Actor	Tokyo Story; Dreams
March	17	Helen Hayes	92	US	Actress	Airport; The Sin of Madelon Claudet
March	21	Fred Phillips	84	US	Makeup Artist	One Flew Over the Cuckoo's Nest; Star Trek: The Motion Picture
March	21	Buddy Swan	63	US	Actor	Citizen Kane; Scared Stiff
March	26	Arthur Maria Rabenalt	87	Austria	Actor	That Won't Keep a Sailor Down; Big Request Concert
March	27	Kate Reid	62	UK	Actress	Atlantic City; The Andromeda Strain
March	31	Brandon Lee	28	US	Actor	The Crow; Showdown in Little Tokyo
April	3	Eugenie Leontovich	83	Russia	Actress	Four Sons; Homicidal
April	3	Alexandre Mnouchkine	85	Russia	Producer	The Name of the Rose; A Pure Formality
April	5	Divya Bharti	19	India	Actress	Bobbili Raja; Deewana
April	7	Gladys Lehman	101	US	Screenwriter	Two Girls and a Sailor; Death Takes a Holiday
April	7	Arleen Whelan	78	US	Actress	Kidnapped; That Wonderful Urge
April	15	William Bakewell	84	US	Actor	Gone with the Wind; All Quiet on the Western Front
April	15	Leslie Charteris	85	Singapore	Screenwriter	Midnight Club; Two Smart People
April	20	Cantinflas	81	Mexico	Actor	Around the World in 80 Days; Pepe
April	29	Michael Gordon	83	US	Director	Pillow Talk; Move Over, Darling
April	29	Cy Howard	77	US	Screenwriter, Director	Marriage on the Rocks; Lovers and Other Strangers
May	6	Ann Todd	82	UK	Actress	The Paradine Case; The Seventh Veil
May	7	Mary Philbin	90	US	Actress	The Phantom of the Opera; The Man Who Laughs
May	9	Mary Duncan	98	US	Actress	City Girl; Morning Glory
May	9	Daniel Paredes	46	US	Costume Designer	Sparkle; Cat People
May	19	Richard Murphy	81	US	Screenwriter, Director	Panic in the Streets; Broken Lance
May	25	Dan Seymour	78	US	Actor	Key Largo; Johnny Belinda
May	26	Jack Priestley	66	US	Cinematographer	The Subject Was Roses; Across 110th Street
May	26	Jan Wiley	77	US	Actress	The Brute Man; Below the Deadline
May	27	Roger MacDougall	82	UK	Screenwriter	The Man in the White Suit; A Touch of Larceny
May	29	Richard Macdonald	73	UK	Production Designer	The Addams Family; Marathon Man
June	5	Conway Twitty	59	US	Singer, Actor	College Confidential; Sex Kittens Go to College
June	6	James Bridges	57	US	Director, Screenwriter	Urban Cowboy; The China Syndrome
June	6	Mort Mills	74	US	Actor	Psycho; Touch of Evil
June	9	Alexis Smith	72	Canada	Actress	San Antonio; Night and Day
June	10	Richard Webb	77	US	Actor	Out of the Past; Carson City
June	11	Bernard Bresslaw	59	UK	Actor	Krull; Jabberwocky
June	11	Ray Sharkey	40	US	Actor	The Idolmaker; Heart Beat
June	22	Victor Maddern	67	UK	Actor	Chitty Chitty Bang Bang; Exodus
June	25	Wes Bishop	60	US	Screenwriter, Producer, Actor	Race with the Devil; The Thing with Two Heads
June	25	Eileen Stevens	77	US	Actress	Invasion of the Body Snatchers; Attack of the 50 Foot Woman
July	2	Fred Gwynne	66	US	Actor	My Cousin Vinny; Munster, Go Home!
July	3	Joe DeRita	83	US	Actor	The Three Stooges Meet Hercules; Have Rocket, Will Travel
July	4	Anne Shirley	75	US	Actress	Stella Dallas; Murder, My Sweet
July	9	John Beaird	40	US	Screenwriter	My Bloody Valentine; Trapped
July	10	Sam Rolfe	69	US	Screenwriter	The Naked Spur; To Trap a Spy
July	15	David Brian	78	US	Actor	The Damned Don't Cry!; The High and the Mighty
July	18	John Beck	83	US	Producer	King Kong vs. Godzilla; Harvey
July	18	Jean Negulesco	93	Romania	Director	How to Marry a Millionaire; Johnny Belinda
July	18	Davis Roberts	77	US	Actor	Westworld; Demon Seed
July	21	Robert Glass	53	US	Sound Engineer	E.T. the Extra-Terrestrial; Close Encounters of the Third Kind
July	21	Valda Hansen	60	US	Actress	Night of the Ghouls; The Great Northfield Minnesota Raid
July	25	Nan Grey	75	US	Actress	Three Smart Girls; The Invisible Man Returns
July	25	Cecilia Parker	79	Canada	Actress	Andy Hardy's Double Life; A Family Affair
July	26	Daniel Fuchs	84	US	Screenwriter	Criss Cross; Love Me or Leave Me
July	31	Lenore Aubert	75	Slovenia	Actress	I Wonder Who's Kissing Her Now; They Got Me Covered
August	1	Claire Du Brey	100	US	Actress	Anything Once; Jesse James
August	3	James Donald	76	UK	Actor	The Great Escape; The Bridge on the River Kwai
August	4	John Pickard	80	US	Actor	True Grit; Arrowhead
August	7	Roy Budd	46	UK	Composer	Get Carter; The Wild Geese
August	8	Harry Bellaver	88	US	Actor	From Here to Eternity; Love Me or Leave Me
August	10	Irene Sharaff	83	US	Costume Designer	West Side Story; Who's Afraid of Virginia Woolf?
August	16	Ellsworth Fredricks	89	US	Cinematographer	Sayonara; Invasion of the Body Snatchers
August	16	Stewart Granger	80	UK	Actor	King Solomon's Mines; Scaramouche
August	23	Gregory Gaye	92	Russia	Actor	Ninotchka; Casablanca
August	23	Charles Scorsese	80	US	Actor	Raging Bull; Goodfellas
August	28	Rene Ray	81	UK	Actress	They Made Me a Fugitive; The Good Die Young
August	30	Richard Jordan	56	US	Actor	The Hunt for Red October; Dune
September	4	Hervé Villechaize	50	France	Actor	The Man with the Golden Gun; Forbidden Zone
September	5	Claude Renoir	79	France	Cinematographer	The Spy Who Loved Me; French Connection II
September	5	John Truscott	57	US	Production Designer, Costume Designer	Camelot; Paint Your Wagon
September	7	Hall Bartlett	70	US	Director	The Caretakers; Zero Hour!
September	10	Janice Carroll	61	US	Actress	Shane; How to Succeed in Business Without Really Trying
September	10	Rita Karin	73	Poland	Actress	Sophie's Choice; Enemies, A Love Story
September	12	Raymond Burr	76	Canada	Actor	Rear Window; A Place in the Sun
September	12	Harold Innocent	58	UK	Actor	Robin Hood: Prince of Thieves; Brazil
September	12	Charles Lamont	98	US	Director	Bagdad; Abbott and Costello in the Foreign Legion
September	17	James Griffith	77	US	Actor, Screenwriter	Bullwhip; The Amazing Transparent Man
September	17	Zita Johann	89	Germany	Actress	The Mummy; Grand Canary
September	17	Christian Nyby	80	US	Film Editor, Director	Red River; The Big Sleep
September	21	Fernand Ledoux	96	France	Actor	La Bête Humaine; The Longest Day
September	23	William Cort	57	US	Actor	Heathers; Ghost
September	29	Gordon Douglas	85	US	Director	Robin and the 7 Hoods; They Call Me Mister Tibbs!
October	2	William Berger	65	Austria	Actor	Sabata; Face to Face
October	5	Jane Nigh	68	US	Actress	Blue Grass of Kentucky; Rodeo
October	7	Cyril Cusack	82	South Africa	Actor	Harold and Maude; My Left Foot
October	7	Kenneth Nelson	63	US	Actor	Hellraiser; The Boys in the Band
October	10	John Bindon	50	UK	Actor	Get Carter; Barry Lyndon
October	11	Alexandra Hay	46	US	Actress	Model Shop; Guess Who's Coming to Dinner
October	12	Patrick Holt	81	UK	Actor	The Wild Geese; The Sea Wolves
October	13	Gwen Welles	42	US	Actress	Nashville; California Split
October	14	Leon Ames	91	US	Actor	Meet Me in St. Louis; Little Women
October	15	Walter Newman	77	US	Screenwriter	Cat Ballou; Ace in the Hole
October	25	Vincent Price	82	US	Actor	Laura; House of Wax
October	26	Albert Zugsmith	83	US	Producer, Director	The Incredible Shrinking Man; Touch of Evil
October	29	Elliot Scott	78	UK	Production Designer	Who Framed Roger Rabbit; Indiana Jones and the Temple of Doom
October	30	Margaret Vyner	78	Australia	Screenwriter, Actress	The Grass Is Greener; Encore
October	31	Federico Fellini	73	Italy	Director, Screenwriter	8½; Amarcord
October	31	River Phoenix	23	US	Actor	Stand by Me; Running on Empty
October	31	Gilman Rankin	82	US	Actor	Midnight Cowboy; Cyrano de Bergerac
November	3	Duncan Gibbins	41	UK	Director	Fire with Fire; Eve of Destruction
November	3	William Lanteau	70	US	Actor	On Golden Pond; Sex and the Single Girl
November	3	John Lupton	65	US	Actor	Jesse James Meets Frankenstein's Daughter; The Great Locomotive Chase
November	4	Ely Landau	73	US	Producer	The Iceman Cometh; The Pawnbroker
November	5	Michael Bilton	73	UK	Actor	A Taste of Honey; The Early Bird
November	5	Mario Cecchi Gori	73	Italy	Producer	Il Postino; The Easy Life
November	7	Charles Aidman	68	US	Actor	War Hunt; Kotch
November	7	Jack Martin Smith	82	US	Art Director	Planet of the Apes; Butch Cassidy and the Sundance Kid
November	9	Stanley Myers	60	UK	Composer	The Deer Hunter; The Greek Tycoon
November	9	Gerald Thomas	72	UK	Director, Film Editor	Carry On; The Vicious Circle
November	10	Wensley Pithey	79	South Africa	Actor	Oliver!; The Saint and the Brave Goose
November	12	Anna Sten	84	Russia	Actress	Nana; The Wedding Night
November	15	Evelyn Venable	80	US	Actress	Death Takes a Holiday; Hollywood Stadium Mystery
November	15	Gladys Walton	90	US	Actress	Playing with Fire; A Little Girl in a Big City
November	16	Ken Renard	87	US	Actor	True Grit; Exorcist II: The Heretic
November	18	Fritz Feld	93	Germany	Actor	Bringing Up Baby; Hello, Dolly!
November	19	Dorothy Revier	89	US	Actress	The Way of All Men; The Iron Mask
November	20	Emile Ardolino	50	US	Director	Dirty Dancing; Sister Act
November	21	Bill Bixby	59	US	Actor	The Apple Dumpling Gang; Clambake
November	21	Richard Wordsworth	78	UK	Actor	The Quatermass Xperiment; The Curse of the Werewolf
November	25	Claudia McNeil	76	US	Actress	A Raisin in the Sun; Black Girl
November	26	Bernardo Segall	82	Brazil	Composer	The Great St. Louis Bank Robbery; Loving
November	28	Kenneth Connor	75	UK	Actor	Carry On; Captain Nemo and the Underwater City
December	5	Alexandre Trauner	87	Hungary	Art Director, Production Designer	The Apartment; The Man Who Would Be King
December	6	Don Ameche	85	US	Actor	Cocoon; Heaven Can Wait
December	10	Maroun Bagdadi	43	Lebanon	Director	Little Wars; The Veiled Man
December	13	Ken Anderson	84	US	Animator, Art Director	Snow White and the Seven Dwarfs; One Hundred and One Dalmatians
December	14	Myrna Loy	88	US	Actress	The Thin Man; Mr. Blandings Builds His Dream House
December	16	Moses Gunn	64	US	Actor	Shaft; The NeverEnding Story
December	17	Janet Margolin	50	US	Actress	David and Lisa; Take the Money and Run
December	18	Steve James	41	US	Actor, Stuntman	American Ninja; I'm Gonna Git You Sucka
December	18	Sam Wanamaker	74	US	Actor	Private Benjamin; Superman IV: The Quest for Peace
December	22	Don DeFore	80	US	Actor	Ramrod; It Happened on Fifth Avenue
December	22	Salah Zulfikar	67	Egypt	Actor, Producer	Aghla Min Hayati; The Other Man
December	22	Alexander Mackendrick	81	UK	Director	Sweet Smell of Success; The Ladykillers
December	23	James Ellison	83	US	Actor	The Plainsman; Vivacious Lady
December	26	Jeff Morrow	86	US	Actor	This Island Earth; Pardners
December	27	Michael Callen	38	US	Actor	Philadelphia; Zero Patience
December	28	William Austin	90	Canada	Film Editor	Flat Top; What Price Vengeance
December	28	Howard Caine	65	US	Actor	Judgment at Nuremberg; 1776
December	29	Marie Kean	75	Ireland	Actress	Barry Lyndon; Ryan's Daughter
December	30	Mack David	81	US	Songwriter	Walk on the Wild Side; Cinderella
December	31	Arthur Dreifuss	85	US	Director, Screenwriter, Producer	The Young Runaways; There's a Girl in My Heart

== Film debuts ==
- Joey Lauren Adams – Coneheads
- Jennifer Aniston – Leprechaun
- Diedrich Bader – The Beverly Hillbillies
- Adam Beach – Cadillac Girls
- Kate Beckinsale – Much Ado About Nothing
- Amber Benson – The Crush
- Elizabeth Berrington – Naked
- Lillo Brancato – A Bronx Tale
- Brent Briscoe – Grey Knight
- Saffron Burrows – In the Name of the Father
- Ezra Buzzington – 27 Pieces of Me
- Neve Campbell – The Dark
- Winston Chao – The Wedding Banquet
- Ben Chaplin – The Remains of the Day
- Joe Chrest – King of the Hill
- Thomas Haden Church – Tombstone
- Roger Cross – Look Who's Talking Now
- Rory Culkin – The Good Son
- Cliff Curtis – The Piano
- Essie Davis – The Custodian
- William DeMeo – A Bronx Tale
- Caroline Dhavernas – Cap Tourmente
- Gary Dourdan – Weekend at Bernie's II
- James Duval – An Ambush of Ghosts
- Aaron Eckhart – Slaughter of the Innocents
- Noah Emmerich – Last Action Hero
- Angie Everhart – Last Action Hero
- Kirk Fox – Treacherous
- James Frain – Shadowlands
- Joseph R. Gannascoli – Money for Nothing
- Michael Gaston – The Wedding Banquet
- Ian Gomez – Excessive Force
- Greg Grunberg – Witchcraft V: Dance with the Devil
- Tom Guiry – The Sandlot
- Salma Hayek – Mi Vida Loca
- Anne Heche – An Ambush of Ghosts
- Barry Shabaka Henley – Fear of a Black Hat
- Taral Hicks – A Bronx Tale
- Terrence Howard – Who's the Man?
- Albert and Allen Hughes (directors) – Menace II Society
- Corey Johnson – The Innocent
- Richard T. Jones – What's Love Got to Do with It
- Vincent Kartheiser – Untamed Heart
- Chris Kattan – The Making of '...And God Spoke'
- Cleo King – Six Degrees of Separation
- Mia Kirshner – Cadillac Girls
- David Krumholtz – Life with Mikey
- Jason Lee – Mi Vida Loca
- Louis Lombardi – Amongst Friends
- Domenick Lombardozzi – A Bronx Tale
- Josh Lucas – Alive
- John Carroll Lynch – Grumpy Old Men
- Danny Masterson – Beethoven's 2nd
- Matthew McConaughey – My Boyfriend's Back
- Patrick Muldoon – Rage and Honor II
- Brittany Murphy – Family Prayers
- Kathrine Narducci – A Bronx Tale
- Arthur J. Nascarella – Guns of Dragon
- Bob Odenkirk – Wayne's World 2
- Julia Ormond – The Baby of Mâcon
- Leland Orser – Cover Story
- John Ortiz – Carlito's Way
- Peter Outerbridge – Paris, France
- Anna Paquin – The Piano
- Parker Posey – Joey Breaker
- Patrick Renna – The Sandlot
- Ryan Reynolds – Ordinary Magic
- Denise Richards – Loaded Weapon 1
- Kevin Michael Richardson – Fatal Instinct
- Carlo Rota – Thirty Two Short Films About Glenn Gould
- Johnathon Schaech – Sparrow
- Michael Shannon – Groundhog Day
- Alicia Silverstone – The Crush
- Bryan Singer (director) – Public Access
- Jada Pinkett Smith – Menace II Society
- Kevin Sorbo – Slaughter of the Innocents
- Nick Stahl – The Man Without a Face
- Mark Strong – Century
- Christine Taylor – Calendar Girl
- Alanna Ubach – Airborne
- Hynden Walch – Groundhog Day
- Steve Zahn – Rain Without Thunder
- Kevin Zegers – Life with Mikey
- Renée Zellweger – Dazed and Confused
