= Keith Marshall =

Keith Marshall may refer to:

- Keith Marshall (baseball) (born 1951), Major League Baseball outfielder
- Keith Marshall (American football) (born 1994), American football running back for the Georgia Bulldogs
- Keith Marshall (Australian footballer) (1907–1993), Australian rules footballer who played with Fitzroy
- Keith Marshall (musician), member of the band Hello
