= Vandame =

Vandame is a French surname. Notable people with the surname include:

- Charles Vandame (born 1928), French-born Jesuit, Archbishop of N’Djaména (1981–2003)
- Pierre Vandame (1913–1993), French field hockey player

== See also ==
- Vandamme
