= Peter Bennett =

Peter Bennett may refer to:

- Peter Bennett, 1st Baron Bennett of Edgbaston (1880–1957), British Conservative party politician
- Peter Bennett, 10th Earl of Tankerville (born 1956), British peer and musician
- Peter Bennett (music promoter) (1935–2012), American music promoter and cousin of singer Tony Bennett
- Peter Bennett (footballer, born 1946) (1946–2024), English footballer
- Peter B. Bennett (1931–2022), American doctor and founder of the Divers Alert Network
- Peter Bennett (footballer, born 1926) (1926–2012), St Kilda VFL footballer
- Peter Bennett (footballer, born 1956), Hawthorn and Essendon VFL footballer
- Pete Bennett (born 1982), winner of the British Big Brother series 7 and Tourette's sufferer
- Peter Bennett (producer), British television producer and first assistant director
- Peter Bennett, New Zealand diplomat
- Peter Bennett (actor) (1917–1989), British stage and television actor
- Pete Bennett (Canadian football) (1928–1993), Canadian football player
- Peter Bennett (soccer, born 1969), Australian soccer player

== See also ==
- Peter Bennetts (born 1967), Australian visual artist
