= Sam Lieberman =

American basketball player (1921–1993)

Personal information
- Born: September 20, 1921 Detroit, Michigan, U.S.
- Died: September 5, 1993 (aged 71) Southfield, Michigan, U.S.
- Listed height: 6 ft 7 in (2.01 m)
- Listed weight: 240 lb (109 kg)

Career information
- College: Lawrence Tech (1940–1943)
- Position: Center

Career history
- 1945–1946: Detroit Mansfields
- 1946: Syracuse Nationals
- 1946–1947: Fitchburg PAMCO's
- 1947–1948: House of David

Samuel R. Lieberman (September 20, 1921 – September 5, 1993) was an American professional basketball player. He played for the Syracuse Nationals in the National Basketball League for two games during their inaugural 1946–47 season and averaged 0.5 points per game.
