= List of crime films of 1993 =

This is a list of crime films released in 1993.

| Title | Director | Cast | Country | Notes |
|---|---|---|---|---|
| Blood In Blood Out | Taylor Hackford | Damian Chapa, Jesse Borrego, Benjamin Bratt | United States | |
| Boiling Point | James B. Harris | Wesley Snipes, Dennis Hopper, Lolita Davidovich | France; United States | |
| A Bronx Tale | Robert De Niro | Robert De Niro, Chazz Palminteri, Lillo Brancato | United States | Gangster film |
| Carlito's Way | Brian De Palma | Al Pacino, Sean Penn, Penelope Ann Miller | United States | |
| The Firm | Sydney Pollack | Tom Cruise, Jeanne Tripplehorn, Gene Hackman, Holly Hunter, Ed Harris, Hal Holbrook, David Strathairn, Wilford Brimley, Gary Busey | United States | Crime drama |
| Kalifornia | Dominic Sena | Brad Pitt, Juliette Lewis, David Duchovny, Michelle Forbes | United States | |
| Maniac Cop 3 | William Lustig, Joel Soisson | Robert Davi, Caitlin Dulany, Gretchen Becker | United States | Crime thriller |
| Manila Boy | Arturo San Agustin | Robin Padilla, Tony Ferrer, Aurora Sevilla | Philippines | Crime action comedy |
| Menace II Society | Albert Hughes, Allen Hughes | Tyrin Turner, Larenz Tate, Jada Pinkett Smith, Charles S. Dutton | United States | |
| A Perfect World | Clint Eastwood | Kevin Costner, Clint Eastwood, Laura Dern, T.J. Lowther, Keith Szarabajka, Leo Burmester, Paul Hewitt, Bradley Whitford, Ray McKinnon, Mary Alice | United States | |
| Red Rock West | John Dahl | Nicolas Cage, Dennis Hopper, Lara Flynn Boyle, J. T. Walsh, Dwight Yoakam, Timothy Carhart | United States | |
| Sonatine | Beat Takeshi Kitano | Beat Takeshi Kitano, Tetsu Watanabe | Japan | |
| True Romance | Tony Scott | Christian Slater, Patricia Arquette, Bronson Pinchot, Saul Rubinek, Dennis Hopper, Gary Oldman, Christopher Walken, Chris Penn, Tom Sizemore, Brad Pitt, Val Kilmer, Samuel L. Jackson, Michael Rapaport, James Gandolfini | United States | |
| The Untold Story | Herman Yau | Anthony Wong, Danny Lee | Hong Kong | |
