= Jack Stelling =

English footballer

Personal information
- Full name: John Graham Surtees Stelling
- Date of birth: 23 May 1924
- Place of birth: Washington, England
- Date of death: 29 March 1993 (aged 68)
- Place of death: Sunderland, England
- Position: Full back

Youth career
- Usworth High Grange

Senior career*
Years	Team	Apps	(Gls)
1944–1956	Sunderland	259	(8)
- * Club domestic league appearances and goals

John Graham Surtees Stelling (23 May 1924 – 29 March 1993) was an English footballer who played for Sunderland as a full back. He signed from Sunderland after being found playing for Non League side Usworth Colliery after the Second World War. Stelling made his first appearance for Sunderland on 5 January 1946 against Grimsby Town in a 3–1 win at Blundell Park. During his time at Sunderland spanning from 1946 until 1956 he had made 259 league appearances scoring 8 goals. Shortly after he retired from playing football in 1956.
