= Gordon Bourne =

Australian cricketer (1913–1993)

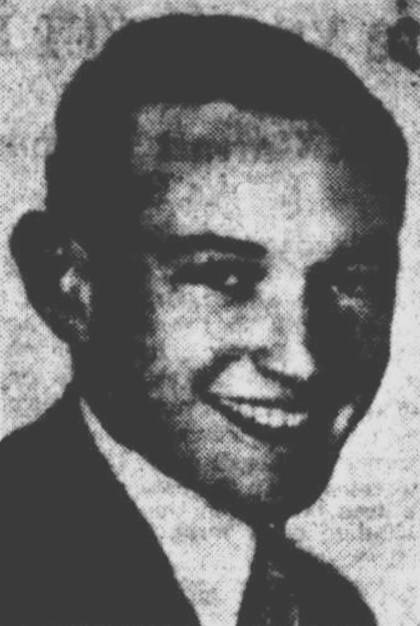

Personal information
- Born: 21 April 1913; Tintenbar, New South Wales, Australia
- Died: 13 September 1993 (aged 80); Goomeri, Queensland, Australia
- Source: Cricinfo, 1 October 2020

Gordon Bourne (21 April 1913 – 13 September 1993) was an Australian cricketer. He played in one first-class match for Queensland in 1930/31.

== Biography ==
Bourne was the eldest son born in his family and he grew up in Goomeri in rural Queensland. He played cricket for Goomeri from at least 1928, and in 1930 he achieved significant attention for a century he scored against Toowoomba which earnt him selection in the Queensland Colts side which traveled to New South Wales and in December he played in a First-class game for Queensland.

In 1932, he participated in a carnival for Country Cricketers, however in 1933 he was omitted from the State Colts team which caused disappointment in the Gympie and Murgon cricket district. In 1934 he played in Country Cricket trials held to assist Country cricketers hoping for State selection but did not play for Queensland again.

In 1937, Bourne married Miss C. Campbell-Wilson. He served in the Army in the Second World War and in 1940 he was the only Queenslander playing for the Australian Imperial Force XI in Palestine.

== See also ==
- List of Queensland first-class cricketers
