= List of Bangladeshi films of 1993 =

This is a list of Bangladeshi films released in 1993.

== Releases ==
Title	Director	Cast	Genre	Notes	Release date	Ref.
Keyamat Theke Keyamat	Sohanur Rahman Sohan	Salman Shah, Moushumi, Nasir Khan, Amol Bose, Ahmed Sharif, Rajib	Romance	Both of Shalman Shah and Moushumi debuted film also Sohanur Rahman Sohan as director	20 March	
Ekattorer Jishu	Nasiruddin Yousuff	Pijush Bandapadhaya, Humayun Faridi, Abul Khair, Sharmili Florence Gaines, Shahiduzzaman Selim	Drama, History			
Prem Dewana	Montazur Rahman Akbar	Manna, Champa, Rajeeb, Humayun Faridi, Shahin Alam	Romance			
Prem Geet	Delwar Jahan Jhantu	Bapparaj, Omar Sani, Lima	Musical, Drama			

== See also ==
- 1993 in Bangladesh
- List of Bangladeshi films of 1994
- List of Bangladeshi films
- Cinema of Bangladesh
- Dhallywood
