= Kevin Fox (footballer) =

Australian rules footballer, born 1917

Personal information
- Full name: Kevin Fox
- Born: 6 October 1917
- Died: 6 September 1993 (aged 75)
- Original team: Brunswick CYMS (CYMSFA)
- Height: 185 cm (6 ft 1 in)
- Weight: 84.5 kg (186 lb)

Playing career^{1}
Years	Club	Games (Goals)
1937–39	Carlton	10 (7)
1940, 1946	Fitzroy	22 (32)
Total		32 (39)
- ^{1} Playing statistics correct to the end of 1946.

Kevin Fox (6 October 1917 – 6 September 1993) was an Australian rules footballer who played with Carlton and Fitzroy in the Victorian Football League (VFL).
