= Hjalmar Thomsen =

Danish field hockey player

Personal information
- Nationality: Danish
- Born: 30 April 1913 Kalundborg, Denmark
- Died: 2 March 1993 (aged 79) Hovedstaden, Denmark

Sport
- Sport: Field hockey

Hjalmar Thomsen (30 April 1913 – 2 March 1993) was a Danish field hockey player. He competed in the men's tournament at the 1948 Summer Olympics.
