= Emil Møller =

Danish footballer (1905-1993)

Personal information
- Date of birth: 19 January 1905
- Place of birth: Horsens, Denmark
- Date of death: 16 September 1993 (aged 88)
- Position: Midfielder

International career
Years	Team	Apps	(Gls)
1932–1933	Denmark	3	(0)

Emil Møller (19 January 1905 – 16 September 1993) was a Danish footballer. He played in three matches for the Denmark national football team from 1932 to 1933.
