= Milton Bororo =

Brazilian footballer

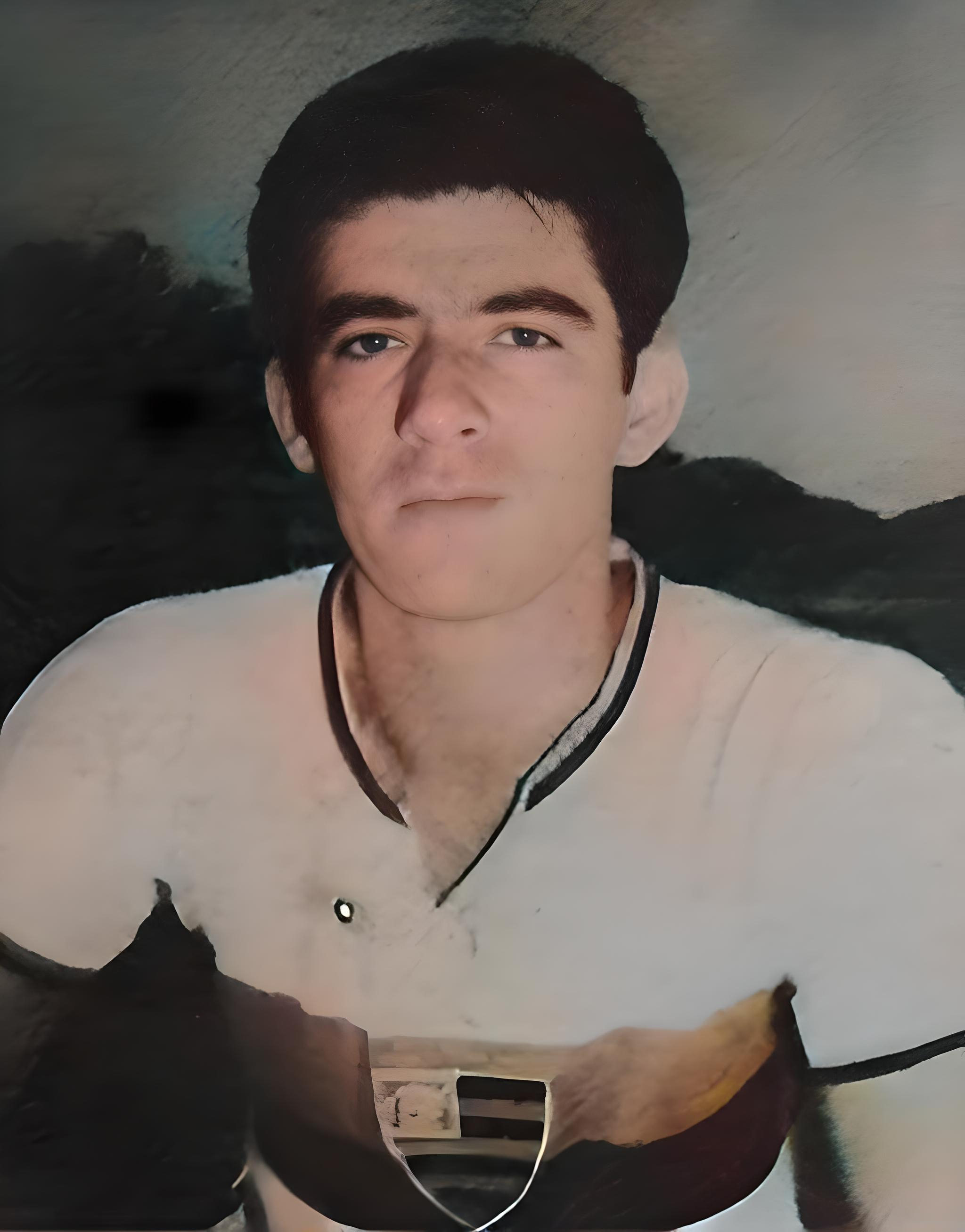

Personal information
- Full name: Milton Bororo Pessanha
- Date of birth: 11 November 1932
- Place of birth: Campos dos Goytacazes, Brazil
- Date of death: 3 March 1993 (aged 60)
- Position: Forward

Senior career*
| Years | Team | Apps | (Gls) |
| 1952–1955 | Fluminense | 34 | (4) |
| 1955–1957 | Flamengo | 20 | (3) |
| 1957–1965 | Grêmio | | |

International career
| 1952 | Brazil Olympics | 3 | (0) |
- * Club domestic league appearances and goals

Milton Bororo Pessanha (11 November 1932 – 3 March 1993) was a Brazilian footballer who competed in the 1952 Summer Olympics.

== Honours ==
Flamengo

- Campeonato Carioca: 1955

Grêmio

- Campeonato Gaúcho: 1957, 1958, 1959, 1960, 1962, 1963, 1964
