= Bruce Gotz =

Australian rules footballer, born 1913

Personal information
- Full name: Martin Bruce Gotz
- Born: 21 July 1913; South Yarra, Victoria
- Died: 19 March 1993 (aged 79)
- Height: 188 cm (6 ft 2 in)
- Weight: 83 kg (183 lb)

Playing career^{1}
Years	Club	Games (Goals)
1934	St Kilda	2 (1)
- ^{1} Playing statistics correct to the end of 1934.

Bruce Gotz (21 July 1913 – 19 March 1993) was an Australian rules footballer who played with St Kilda in the Victorian Football League (VFL).

He was the son of Carlton and Port Melbourne player, Martin Gotz.
