= Keith Chamberlain =

Australian rules footballer, born 1913

Personal information
- Full name: Keith Chamberlain
- Born: 8 June 1913
- Died: 3 September 1993 (aged 80)

Playing career^{1}
Years	Club	Games (Goals)
1934	North Melbourne	2 (0)
- ^{1} Playing statistics correct to the end of 1934.

Keith Chamberlain (8 June 1913 – 3 September 1993) was an Australian rules footballer who played with North Melbourne in the Victorian Football League (VFL).
