= Hendrick Lubbers =

American field hockey player (1926–1993)

Personal information
- Born: December 30, 1926 Bronxville, New York, U.S.
- Died: March 18, 1993 (aged 66) Indianapolis, Indiana, U.S.

Sport
- Sport: Field hockey

Hendrick Lubbers (December 30, 1926 – March 18, 1993) was an American field hockey player. He competed in the men's tournament at the 1948 Summer Olympics.
