= Jack Lancaster (footballer) =

Australian rules footballer, born 1919

Personal information
- Full name: Jack Lancaster
- Born: 31 March 1919
- Died: 25 March 1993 (aged 73)
- Original team: Thornbury CYMS (CYMSFA)
- Height: 180 cm (5 ft 11 in)
- Weight: 75 kg (165 lb)

Playing career^{1}
| Years | Club | Games (Goals) |
| 1943–44 | Fitzroy | 9 (6) |
- ^{1} Playing statistics correct to the end of 1944.

Jack Lancaster (31 March 1919 – 25 March 1993) was a former Australian rules footballer who played with Fitzroy in the Victorian Football League (VFL).
