= Les Scollard =

Australian rules footballer, born 1908

Personal information
- Full name: Leslie Leonard Alfred Scollard
- Born: 11 June 1908; Fitzroy, Victoria
- Died: 11 September 1993 (aged 85); Noble Park, Victoria
- Original team: Chelsea

Playing career^{1}
| Years | Club | Games (Goals) |
| 1929 | Fitzroy | 3 (1) |
- ^{1} Playing statistics correct to the end of 1929.

Leslie Leonard Alfred Scollard (11 June 1908 – 11 September 1993) was an Australian rules footballer who played with Fitzroy in the Victorian Football League (VFL).

== Family ==
The son of William Scollard, and Clara Scollard, née Spicer, Leslie Leonard Alfred Scollard was born at Fitzroy, Victoria on 11 June 1908.

He married Lilian Maude Moore (1905-) in 1930.

== Military service ==
Scollard served in the Royal Australian Air Force during World War II.
