= George Roark =

American football, basketball, and baseball player

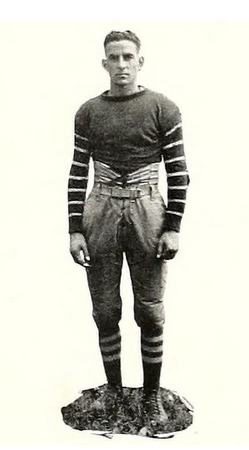
- Roark pictured in The Bethanian 1922, Bethany yearbook

Biographical details
- Born: October 7, 1898
- Died: March 31, 1993 (aged 94)

Playing career

Football
- 1919–1921: Bethany (WV)

Basketball
- 1920–1922: Bethany (WV)
- 1923–1924: Bethany (WV)

Baseball
- 1921–1922: Bethany (WV)
- 1924–1925: Bethany (WV)
- Positions: End (football); Forward (basketball); Catcher (baseball)

Coaching career (HC unless noted)

Football
- 1929: Follansbee HS (WV)
- 1930–1935: New Brighton HS (PA)
- 1936: Westminster (PA)
- 1937–1940: Washington & Jefferson
- 1941–?: New Brighton HS (PA)

Head coaching record
- Overall: 18–18–3 (college)

George Wheeler Roark (October 7, 1898 – March 31, 1993) was an American football, basketball, and baseball player and coach of football, basketball, and track. He served as the head football coach at Westminster College of New Wilmington, Pennsylvania in 1936 and at Washington & Jefferson College from 1937 to 1940, compiling a career college football record of 18–18–3. Roark also coached basketball and track at Westminster.

Roark was a native of Altavista, Virginia. He attended Bethany College in West Virginia, where he lettered in football, basketball, and baseball, and graduated with the class of 1925. He played catcher on the baseball team with pitcher Ed Wells, who went on to play Major League Baseball. Roarke resigned from his post at Washington & Jefferson in December 1940 to coach football at New Brighton, Pennsylvania's high school, where he had coached football and basketball from 1930 to 1935. In his first stint at New Brighton, his football teams tallied a mark of 33–9–3.

== Head coaching record ==
=== College ===
Year	Team	Overall	Conference	Standing	Bowl/playoffs
Westminster Titans (Independent) (1936)
1936	Westminster	2–4–1			
Westminster:		2–4–1			
Washington & Jefferson Presidents (Independent) (1937–1940)
1937	Washington & Jefferson	2–5–1			
1938	Washington & Jefferson	5–2–1			
1939	Washington & Jefferson	5–3			
1940	Washington & Jefferson	4–4			
Washington & Jefferson:		16–14–2			
Total:		18–18–3			
