= Gábor Zsiborás =

Hungarian footballer

Personal information
- Date of birth: 12 November 1957
- Place of birth: Budapest, Hungary
- Date of death: 7 September 1993 (aged 35)
- Position: Goalkeeper

Youth career
- –1977: Ferencváros

Senior career*
Years	Team	Apps	(Gls)
1977–1989	Ferencváros	244	(0)
1989–1993	MTK Budapest	117	(0)
Total		361	(0)

International career
1979–1987	Hungary	4	(0)
- * Club domestic league appearances and goals

Gábor Zsiborás (12 November 1957 – 7 September 1993) was a Hungarian professional footballer who played as a goalkeeper.

== Career statistics ==
=== Club ===
Club	Season	League			Cup		Continental		Other		Total	
Club	Season	Division	Apps	Goals	Apps	Goals	Apps	Goals	Apps	Goals	Apps	Goals
Ferencváros	1977–78	Nemzeti Bajnokság I	9	0	0	0	–		0	0	1	0
Ferencváros	1978–79	Nemzeti Bajnokság I	24	0	0	0	–		0	0	1	0
Ferencváros	1979–80	Nemzeti Bajnokság I	30	0	0	0	–		0	0	1	0
Ferencváros	1980–81	Nemzeti Bajnokság I	1	0	0	0	–		0	0	1	0
Ferencváros	1981–82	Nemzeti Bajnokság I	16	0	0	0	–		0	0	1	0
Ferencváros	1982–83	Nemzeti Bajnokság I	24	0	0	0	–		0	0	1	0
Ferencváros	1983–84	Nemzeti Bajnokság I	30	0	0	0	–		0	0	1	0
Ferencváros	1984–85	Nemzeti Bajnokság I	27	0	0	0	–		0	0	1	0
Ferencváros	1985–86	Nemzeti Bajnokság I	30	0	0	0	–		0	0	1	0
Ferencváros	1986–87	Nemzeti Bajnokság I	28	0	0	0	–		0	0	1	0
Ferencváros	1987–88	Nemzeti Bajnokság I	25	0	0	0	–		0	0	1	0
Ferencváros	Total		244	0	0	0	0	0	0	0	244	0
MTK Budapest	1989–90	Nemzeti Bajnokság I	27	0	0	0	–		0	0	27	0
MTK Budapest	1990–91	Nemzeti Bajnokság I	28	0	0	0	–		0	0	28	0
MTK Budapest	1991–92	Nemzeti Bajnokság I	29	0	0	0	–		0	0	29	0
MTK Budapest	1992–93	Nemzeti Bajnokság I	30	0	0	0	–		0	0	30	0
MTK Budapest	1993–94	Nemzeti Bajnokság I	3	0	0	0	–		0	0	3	0
MTK Budapest	Total		117	0	0	0	0	0	0	0	117	0
Career total			361	0	0	0	0	0	0	0	361	0

=== International ===
National team	Year	Apps	Goals
Hungary	1979	1	0
Hungary	1983	2	0
Hungary	1987	1	0
Total		4	0
