= Keith Marshall (Australian footballer) =

Australian rules footballer

Personal information
- Full name: Keith Marshall
- Born: 22 April 1907
- Died: 23 September 1993 (aged 86)

Playing career^{1}
Years	Club	Games (Goals)
1933	Fitzroy	2 (5)
- ^{1} Playing statistics correct to the end of 1933.

Keith Marshall (22 April 1907 – 23 September 1993) was an Australian rules footballer who played with Fitzroy in the Victorian Football League (VFL).
