= Pierre Vandame =

French field hockey player

Pierre Georges Corneille Vandame (17 June 1913 – 6 March 1993) was a French field hockey player who competed in the 1948 Summer Olympics.
