= The King of Comedy (film) =

1982 film directed by Martin Scorsese

- Theatrical release poster
- Directed by: Martin Scorsese
- Written by: Paul D. Zimmerman
- Produced by: Arnon Milchan
- Starring: Robert De Niro; Jerry Lewis; Tony Randall; Diahnne Abbott; Sandra Bernhard
- Cinematography: Fred Schuler
- Edited by: Thelma Schoonmaker
- Music by: Robbie Robertson
- Production company: Embassy International Pictures
- Distributed by: 20th Century-Fox
- Release dates: December 18, 1982 (Iceland); February 18, 1983 (United States)
- Running time: 109 minutes
- Country: United States
- Language: English
- Budget: $19 million
- Box office: $2.5 million

The King of Comedy is a 1982 American satirical black comedy film directed by Martin Scorsese and written by Paul D. Zimmerman. The film stars Robert De Niro—in his fifth collaboration with Scorsese—alongside Jerry Lewis and Sandra Bernhard. It follows an aspiring stand-up comedian whose obsessive desire for fame leads him to target a successful late-night television host, exploring themes of celebrity culture, media illusion, and the pursuit of notoriety.

Principal photography began in New York City on June 1, 1981, in part to avoid disruption from a planned Writers Guild of America strike. The film was produced by Embassy International Pictures—later incorporated into Regency Enterprises—and marked Jerry Lewis's third collaboration with 20th Century-Fox. The King of Comedy premiered internationally in Iceland in December 1982 before its North American release on February 18, 1983, by 20th Century-Fox. It was also screened at the Cannes Film Festival in 1983.

The film received generally positive reviews from critics, who praised its performances—particularly those of De Niro and Lewis—and its unsettling tone and social commentary. Despite the critical response, it was a commercial failure, grossing approximately $2.5 million against a production budget of $19 million. In the years following its release, The King of Comedy has undergone significant critical reappraisal and is widely regarded as one of Scorsese’s most distinctive and prescient works. Its exploration of fame, media spectacle, and the blurring of fantasy and reality has been noted for its relevance to contemporary celebrity culture, and the film has since achieved cult status.

== Plot ==
Rupert Pupkin is a delusional stand-up comedian unsuccessfully trying to launch his career. After meeting Jerry Langford, a successful comedian and talk-show host, Rupert believes that his "big break" has finally come. He attempts to book a spot on the show but is continually rebuffed by Langford's staff and finally by Langford himself. Along the way, Rupert indulges in elaborate and obsessive fantasies in which he and Langford are colleagues and friends.

Hoping to impress, Rupert arrives uninvited at Langford's country home with a date, Rita. Returning to his house from playing golf, Langford finds Rupert and Rita settling in. Angered, Langford launches into a furious tirade against Rupert, telling him that his act is mediocre and that he is a lunatic who will never amount to anything. An embarrassed Rita convinces Rupert to leave.

Desperate, Rupert enlists Masha, a fellow stalker similarly obsessed with Langford. Together, they kidnap and hold Langford hostage in Masha's parents' Manhattan townhouse. As ransom, Rupert demands that he be given the opening spot on that evening's The Jerry Langford Show, and that the show be broadcast as normal (with Tony Randall as guest host). The network brass and the FBI agree to his demands, with the understanding that Langford will be released immediately after the show airs. Between the taping of the show and the broadcast, Masha has her "dream date" with Langford, who is duct-taped to a chair. Langford convinces her to untie him and escapes.

Rupert's stand-up routine is well received by the audience. In his act, he describes his troubled life while simultaneously laughing at his circumstances. Rupert closes by confessing to the studio audience that he kidnapped Jerry Langford to break into show business. The audience laughs, believing it to be part of his act. Rupert responds by saying, "Tomorrow you'll know I wasn't kidding, and you'll all think I'm crazy. But I figure it this way: better to be king for a night than a schmuck for a lifetime."

News reports of Rupert's phenomenal success at comedy, as well as his prison sentence and release, play over a montage of his performances, and of storefronts stocking his "long-awaited" autobiography King For a Night. Reports state that Rupert still considers Jerry Langford to be his mentor and friend, and that he and his agent are currently weighing several "attractive offers", including comedy tours and a film adaptation of his memoirs. In the end, Rupert takes the stage for an apparent TV special with a live audience and an announcer enthusiastically introducing, lavishly praising, and giving him extended applause.

== Cast ==
=== Principal cast ===
- Robert De Niro as Rupert Pupkin, a struggling stand-up comedian with mental health issues who longs to appear on Langford's show. Pupkin refers to himself as "The King of Comedy".
- Jerry Lewis as Jerry Langford, a famous late-night TV host.
- Sandra Bernhard as Masha, another mentally unstable fan of Langford.
- Diahnne Abbott as Rita Keene, a bartender who is Rupert's love interest.

=== Supporting cast ===
- Shelley Hack as Cathy Long, Langford's main secretary.
- Margo Winkler as a receptionist of Langford's production company.
- Kim Chan as Jonno, a house servant of Langford.
- Frederick De Cordova as Bert Thomas, a producer of Langford's show.
- Edgar Scherick as Wilson Crockett, a network television executive.
- Senator Bobby as Clarence McCabe, a man who believes he is the third guest on Pupkin's show.
- Ed Herlihy as himself.
- Tony Randall as himself.
- Victor Borge as himself.
- Joyce Brothers as herself.

=== Cameo appearances ===
- Catherine Scorsese as Mrs. Pupkin, Rupert's mother (voice only).
- Cathy Scorsese as Dolores, a fan of Pupkin in one of his daydreams.
- Charles Scorsese as first Man at Bar.
- Martin Scorsese as TV director.

The Clash—members Mick Jones, Joe Strummer, Paul Simonon, their manager Kosmo Vinyl—and the musicians Ellen Foley and Don Letts appear as "street scum". Mary Elizabeth Mastrantonio plays an extra in a crowd scene, and is not listed in the film's credits.

== Production ==
After Raging Bull was completed, Scorsese had thought about retiring from feature films to instead make documentaries because he felt "unsatisfied" and had not found his "inner peace" yet. However, he was keen to do a pet project of his, The Last Temptation of Christ, and wanted De Niro to play Jesus Christ. De Niro was not interested and preferred their next collaboration to be a comedy. He had purchased the rights to a script by film critic Paul D. Zimmerman. Michael Cimino was announced as the director for The King of Comedy on March 7, 1979, but was replaced by Martin Scorsese on November 10 due to production being stalled by Cimino's focus on the editing process of Heaven's Gate.

Scorsese pondered whether he could face shooting another film, particularly with a looming strike by the Writers Guild of America. Producer Arnon Milchan tried to keep the project away from Hollywood interference by filming entirely on-location in New York, and felt that he could deliver it on time with the involvement of a smaller film company.

After a strong critical appreciation for the way in which he had shot Raging Bull, Scorsese felt that The King of Comedy needed a rawer cinematic style that would take its cues from early silent cinema, using more static camera shots and fewer dramatic close-ups. Scorsese has noted that Edwin S. Porter's 1903 film Life of an American Fireman greatly influenced The King of Comedy's visual style. Scorsese shot scenes multiple times, spending a fortnight reshooting to perfect one scene, resulting in a large amount of footage that had to be edited.

De Niro prepared for the role of Rupert Pupkin by developing a "role reversal" technique, consisting of chasing down his own autograph hunters, stalking them, and asking them many questions. As Scorsese remembered, he even agreed to meet and talk with one of his longtime stalkers:

The guy was waiting for him with his wife, a shy suburban woman who was rather embarrassed by the situation. He wanted to take him to dinner at their house, a two-hour drive from New York. After he had persuaded him to stay in Manhattan, [De Niro] asked him, "Why are you stalking me? What do you want?" He replied, "To have dinner with you, have a drink, chat. My mom asked me to say hi."

De Niro also spent months watching stand-up comedians at work to get the rhythm and timing of their performances. Fully in phase with his character, he went as far as declining an invitation to dinner from Lewis because he was "supposed to be at his throat and ready to kill him for [his] chance".

In the biography/overview of his work, Scorsese on Scorsese, the director has high praise for Jerry Lewis, stating that during their first conversation before shooting, Lewis was extremely professional and assured him before shooting that there would be no ego clashes nor difficulties. Scorsese said that he felt that Lewis's performance in the film was vastly underrated and deserved more acclaim.

In an interview with People magazine, Lewis claimed that Scorsese and De Niro employed method acting tricks during the filming, such as using antisemitic epithets to "pump up Lewis's anger". Lewis described making the film as a pleasurable experience and noted that he got along well with both Scorsese and De Niro. Lewis said that he was invited to collaborate on certain aspects of the script dealing with celebrity life. He suggested an ending in which Rupert Pupkin kills Jerry, but it was declined. As a result, Lewis thought that the film, while good, did not have a "finish".

In an interview for the DVD, Scorsese stated that Lewis proposed the brief scene in which Langford, having acquiesced to an old lady's request for an autograph, refuses to speak on the phone to her relative, prompting her to scream at him, "You should only get cancer!" The scene was based on a real incident from Lewis's life, and he directed the actress playing the old lady to get the timing right.

=== Writing ===
At the time he wrote his script, Paul D. Zimmerman was inspired by a David Susskind show on autograph hunters and an Esquire article on a fanatical Johnny Carson follower. Scorsese first became aware of Zimmerman's script after it was brought to him by Robert De Niro in 1974, but declined the project, citing that he felt no personal connection with it. Michael Cimino was attached to direct but his involvement with the script ended when he left the project to direct Heaven's Gate. Prompted by the alienation that he felt from his growing celebrity status, as well as De Niro's insistence that the film could be made "real fast", and that it would be a "New York movie", Scorsese's interest in the project was rekindled.

=== Casting ===
Scorsese's first choice for talk-show host Jerry Langford was Johnny Carson. Carson refused the role, saying, "You know that one take is enough for me". Joey Bishop, Orson Welles and Dick Cavett were also considered. The entire Rat Pack was also considered—specifically Frank Sinatra and Dean Martin—before a decision was made to select Martin's old partner, Jerry Lewis.

=== Principal photography ===
Arnon Milchan suggested that shooting begin a month earlier than scheduled to avoid possible work stoppage from the Directors Guild of America strike. Furthermore, Scorsese was not in good health. The film was shot beginning on June 1, 1981, and lasted for a twenty-week period, with Scorsese shooting from 4 p.m. to 7 p.m. every day.

=== Scorsese's health ===
Scorsese had suffered from poor health both before and during the film's production. He had worked on three films without much rest, and not long after, found himself hospitalized due to exhaustion and pneumonia. He had not fully recovered when shooting on The King of Comedy began. The intensive filming schedule meant that Scorsese could spend the remainder of his time recuperating.

=== Music ===
Robbie Robertson produced the music for the film's soundtrack and contributed his first original work after leaving The Band, titled "Between Trains". The song, a tribute to a member of the production staff who had suddenly died, is on the soundtrack album but not in the movie.

The King of Comedy soundtrack is a mix of popular music and thematic orchestral scoring by composer Bob James. The soundtrack includes songs from artists such as B.B. King, Van Morrison and Ray Charles. This reflects Scorsese's career-long stylistic focus on integrating popular music into his films.

==== Soundtrack album ====
A soundtrack album was released on LP and cassette by Warner Bros. Records in 1983. The soundtrack was released on CD by Wounded Bird Records in 2016.

1. The Pretenders – "Back on the Chain Gang" (3:51)
2. B.B. King – "Ain't Nobody's Business" (3:33)
3. Talking Heads – "Swamp" (5:13)
4. Bob James – "King of Comedy" (4:23)
5. Rickie Lee Jones – "Rainbow Sleeves" (3:39)
6. Robbie Robertson – "Between Trains" (3:25)
7. Ric Ocasek – "Steal the Night" (3:42)
8. Ray Charles – "Come Rain or Come Shine" (3:40)
9. David Sanborn – "The Finer Things" (4:27)
10. Van Morrison – "Wonderful Remark" (3:57)

== Home media ==
The King of Comedy was released on Region 1 DVD on December 12, 2002, and on Region 2 on April 19, 2004.

A digital restoration of the movie was presented on April 27, 2013, as the closing film of De Niro's Tribeca Film Festival. This version is produced from the film's original camera negatives and features a restored soundtrack. Although the restored film was scheduled to be released on Blu-ray on October 29, 2013, the 30th-anniversary home-media release was ultimately delayed until March 25, 2014.

== Reception and legacy ==
Although the film was well received by critics, it bombed at the box office. De Niro said that the film "maybe wasn't so well received because it gave off an aura of something that people didn't want to look at or know".

As of October 2023, 89% of critics have given the film a positive review on review aggregator Rotten Tomatoes based on 73 critic reviews, with an average rating of 8.30/10. The site's critics consensus states: "Largely misunderstood upon its release, The King of Comedy today looks eerily prescient, and features a fine performance by Robert De Niro as a strangely sympathetic psychopath." Metacritic gives it a weighted average score of 73 out of 100 based on 13 critic reviews, indicating "generally favorable" reviews.

Time Out magazine called it the "creepiest movie of the year in every sense, and one of the best".

Roger Ebert of the Chicago Sun-Times gave the film three stars out of four, writing, "The King of Comedy is one of the most arid, painful, wounded movies I've ever seen. It's hard to believe Scorsese made it." He also wrote, "Scorsese doesn't want laughs in this movie, and he also doesn't want release. The whole movie is about the inability of the characters to get any kind of a positive response to their bids for recognition." He concluded that the film "is not, you may already have guessed, a fun movie. It is also not a bad movie. It is frustrating to watch, unpleasant to remember, and, in its own way, quite effective." Ebert's cohost Gene Siskel of the Chicago Tribune recommended it on his list as part of their "Buried Treasures" in a 1986 episode of their syndicated television series At the Movies.

Dave Kehr of the Chicago Reader gave the film a favorable review, calling it "clearly an extension of Taxi Driver", and that the "uncenteredness of the film is irritating, though it's irritating in an ambitious, risk-taking way".

Joyce Millman of Salon called it "Martin Scorsese's second-least popular movie, after The Last Temptation of Christ. Which is a shame, because it's Scorsese's second-greatest film, after Taxi Driver."

However, not all critics gave the film positive reviews. Adam Smith of Empire magazine called it "neither funny enough to be an effective black comedy nor scary enough to capitalise on its thriller/horror elements".

David Ehrenstein, author of The Scorsese Picture, noted the mixed response of the film in his 1983 review. He stated that The King of Comedy "cuts too close to the bone for either large-scale mass audience approval or unanimous mainstream critical acclaim". He believed that the film presented a very critical portrayal of the Reagan administration in contrast to other films made during the administration's early years (although the script was written well before Reagan's election, and shooting began less than five months after Reagan took office). "At a time when the film world piles on simple-minded sentiment in thick gooey gobs, a picture like The King of Comedy appears a frontal assault. The triumph of the 'little guy' is revealed to be nothing more than lumpen neo-Fascist blood lust."

Pauline Kael of The New Yorker was one of the critics who disliked the film, describing the character of Rupert Pupkin as "Jake LaMotta without fists". She wrote that "De Niro in disguise denies his characters a soul. De Niro's 'bravura' acting in Mean Streets, Taxi Driver and New York, New York collapsed into 'anti-acting' after he started turning himself into repugnant flesh effigies of soulless characters... Pupkin is a nothing." Scorsese says that "people were confused with King of Comedy and saw Bob as some sort of mannequin". Scorsese has called De Niro's role as Rupert Pupkin his favorite of all their collaborations.

Japanese filmmaker Akira Kurosawa cited The King of Comedy as one of his favorite films. German director Wim Wenders numbered it among his 15 favorite films. In a 2010 retrospective, Mark Kermode ranked the film among Scorsese's finest.

Sandra Bernhard, who plays Masha in the film, indicated in a 2013 interview that Jack Black was interested in a remake. However, she dismissed the idea, saying that it was "too late" to do it.

Actor Steve Carell and director Bennett Miller, both black comedy fans, cited The King of Comedy as a personal favorite and inspiration to shape the sociopathic character of John E. du Pont in Foxcatcher.

The screenplay for the 2019 film Joker, which also features De Niro and is written by director Todd Phillips and co-writer Scott Silver, is frequently cited by Phillips as taking inspiration from both The King of Comedy and Scorsese's 1976 film Taxi Driver.

=== Debate about ending ===
The film provides no definitive answer as to whether the ending is reality or fantasy.

In his commentary on The Criterion Collection DVD of Black Narcissus, Scorsese stated that Michael Powell's films influenced The King of Comedy in its conception of fantasy. Scorsese said that Powell always treated fantasy as no different from reality, and thus made fantasy sequences as realistic as possible. Scorsese suggests that Rupert Pupkin's character fails to differentiate between his fantasies and reality in much the same way. Scorsese sought to achieve the same with the film so that, in his words, the "fantasy is more real than reality".

=== Taxi Driver connection ===
Rupert Pupkin has been compared to Travis Bickle in Taxi Driver: both characters have serious issues with reality testing that is drawing the line between outer objective and inner subjective reality. In her review, entertainment columnist Marilyn Beck approved Johnny Carson's refusal to participate in The King of Comedy, supposedly because he feared that the film could inspire psychopaths like John Hinckley. Beck considered The King of Comedy even more dangerous than Taxi Driver due to its lack of blood and gore, as well as the fact that viewers could easily identify with De Niro.

In a documentary featured on the first DVD release of the film, Scorsese acknowledged the connection between the two characters: "Taxi Driver. Travis. Rupert. The isolated person. Is Rupert more violent than Travis? Maybe."

=== Critic's lists ===
- American Film's list of the Best Films of the 1980s – No. 10
- Halliwell's Top 1000 – No. 180
- 1001 Movies You Must See Before You Die
- Jonathan Rosenbaum: 1000 Essential Films
- The New York Times Guide to the Best 1,000 Movies Ever Made
- Empire's The 500 Greatest Movies of All Time – No. 87

== Awards and nominations ==
Year	Association	Category	Nominated work	Result	Ref.
1983	Cannes Film Festival	Palme d'Or	Martin Scorsese	Nominated	
1983	BAFTA Awards	Best Direction	Martin Scorsese	Nominated	
1983	BAFTA Awards	Best Actor	Robert De Niro	Nominated	
1983	BAFTA Awards	Best Supporting Actor	Jerry Lewis	Nominated	
1983	BAFTA Awards	Best Original Screenplay	Paul D. Zimmerman	Won	
1983	BAFTA Awards	Best Film Editing	Thelma Schoonmaker	Nominated	
1984	London Film Critics' Circle	Best Film of the Year	The King of Comedy	Won	
1984	National Society of Film Critics	Best Supporting Actress	Sandra Bernhard	Won	

== See also ==
- List of films featuring psychopaths and sociopaths

== Works cited ==
- Medved, Harry; Medved, Michael (1984). The Hollywood Hall of Shame: The Most Expensive Flops in Movie History. Angus & Robertson. ISBN 0-207-14929-1.
