= Pete Bennett (Canadian football) =

Canadian football player

Profile
- Position: Tackle

Personal information
- Born: c. 1928; Toronto, Ontario
- Died: September 6, 1993 (aged 64–65); Toronto, Ontario
- Listed height: 6 ft 3 in (1.91 m)
- Listed weight: 245 lb (111 kg)

Career history
- 1948–1960: Toronto Argonauts
- 1960: Hamilton Tiger-Cats

Awards and highlights
- 2× Grey Cup champion (1950, 1952)

Peter Bennett (c. 1928 – September 6, 1993) was a Canadian professional football player who played for the Toronto Argonauts, Hamilton Tiger-Cats. He won the Grey Cup with Toronto in 1950 and 1952. Bennett previously played junior football for the Junior Toronto Balmy Beach Beachers and attended the University of Toronto. He died in 1993 after a heart attack.
