= Paul D. Zimmerman =

American screenwriter

Paul D. Zimmerman (July 3, 1938 in New York City, New York – March 2, 1993 in Princeton, New Jersey) was a screenwriter, film critic and activist.

== Career ==
He was a film critic for Newsweek magazine from 1967 to 1975, and wrote for television shows including Sesame Street, but is best known for writing The King of Comedy (1982), directed by Martin Scorsese. He was the co-writer of Lovers and Liars (1979) and Consuming Passions (1988). Zimmerman was the author of many other screenplays, mostly unproduced, as well as three books:

- The Marx Brothers at the Movies (1968)
- The Year the Mets Lost Last Place (1969)
- The Open Man: The Championship Diary of the N.Y. Knicks (1970)

Active in the Nuclear Freeze movement, he founded the Bucks Alliance for Nuclear Disarmament, funded by the proceeds from a sold-out premiere he organized for King of Comedy. In 1984, he managed to become a member of the Pennsylvania delegation to the Republican Party convention in order to be the only delegate to vote against Ronald Reagan.

== Death ==
Zimmerman died of colon cancer.

== Awards and nominations ==
Award	Category	Work	Result	Ref(s)
BAFTA Awards	BAFTA Award for Best Original Screenplay*; *Zimmerman was the first winner of this award	The King of Comedy	Won	
