= Robert Pratt =

Robert Pratt may refer to:

- Robert Pratt (American football) (born 1951), former American football guard
- Robert John Pratt (1907–2003), Canadian architect
- Robert W. Pratt (1947–2026), U.S. federal judge
- Robert Pratt (settler) (1870–1935), Canadian settler
- Robert Pratt (mayor) (1845–1908), educator and mayor of Minneapolis, Minnesota

== See also ==
- Bob Pratt (1912–2001), Australian rules footballer
- Bob Pratt Jr. (born 1936), Australian rules footballer
- Bob Pratt (inventor), American inventor and former engineer
