= 1935 VFL grand final =

Grand final of the 1935 Victorian Football League season

1935 VFL Grand Final

| Collingwood | South Melbourne |
|---|---|
| 11.12 (78) | 7.16 (58) |
| | 1 | 2 | 3 | 4 |
|---|---|---|---|---|
| COLL | 1.3 (9) | 6.6 (42) | 8.10 (58) | 11.12 (78) |
| SM | 3.6 (24) | 4.8 (32) | 6.10 (46) | 7.16 (58) |
- Date: 5 October 1935
- Stadium: Melbourne Cricket Ground
- Attendance: 54,154

The 1935 VFL Grand Final was an Australian rules football game contested between the Collingwood Football Club and South Melbourne Football Club, held at the Melbourne Cricket Ground in Melbourne on 5 October 1935. It was the 37th annual Grand Final of the Victorian Football League, staged to determine the premiers for the 1935 VFL season. The match, attended by 54,154 spectators, was won by Collingwood by a margin of 20 points, marking that club's tenth premiership victory.

On Grand Final eve, South Melbourne's champion full-forward Bob Pratt was hit by a brick truck when exiting a tram. He was replaced at full-forward by Roy Moore. Neither Moore nor Laurie Nash at centre half-forward were able to break free of their opponents (Charlie Dibbs and Jack Regan, respectively), helping Collingwood to win the match.

== Teams ==
| Collingwood | S. Melbourne |

Collingwood
| B: | Harold Rumney | Charlie Dibbs | Jack Ross |
| HB: | Bervyn Woods | Jack Regan | Fred Froude |
| C: | Leo Morgan | Marcus Whelan | Jack Carmody |
| HF: | Lou Riley | Phonse Kyne | Vin Doherty |
| F: | Alby Pannam | Gordon Coventry | Keith Fraser |
| Foll: | Albert Collier | Percy Bowyer | Harry Collier (c) |
| Res: | Keith Stackpole | | |
| Coach: | Jock McHale | | |

South Melbourne
| B: | Jack Austin | Ron Hillis | Reg Humphries |
| HB: | Jock McKenzie | Lin Richards | Bill Faul |
| C: | Harry Clarke | Herbie Matthews | Jim Reid |
| HF: | Joe O'Meara | Laurie Nash | Austin Robertson |
| F: | Dinny Kelleher | Roy Moore | Frank Davies |
| Foll: | Jack Bissett (c) | Brighton Diggins | Terry Brain |
| Res: | Roy McEachen | | |
| Coach: | Jack Bissett | | |

- Umpire – Bob Scott

== Statistics ==
=== Score ===
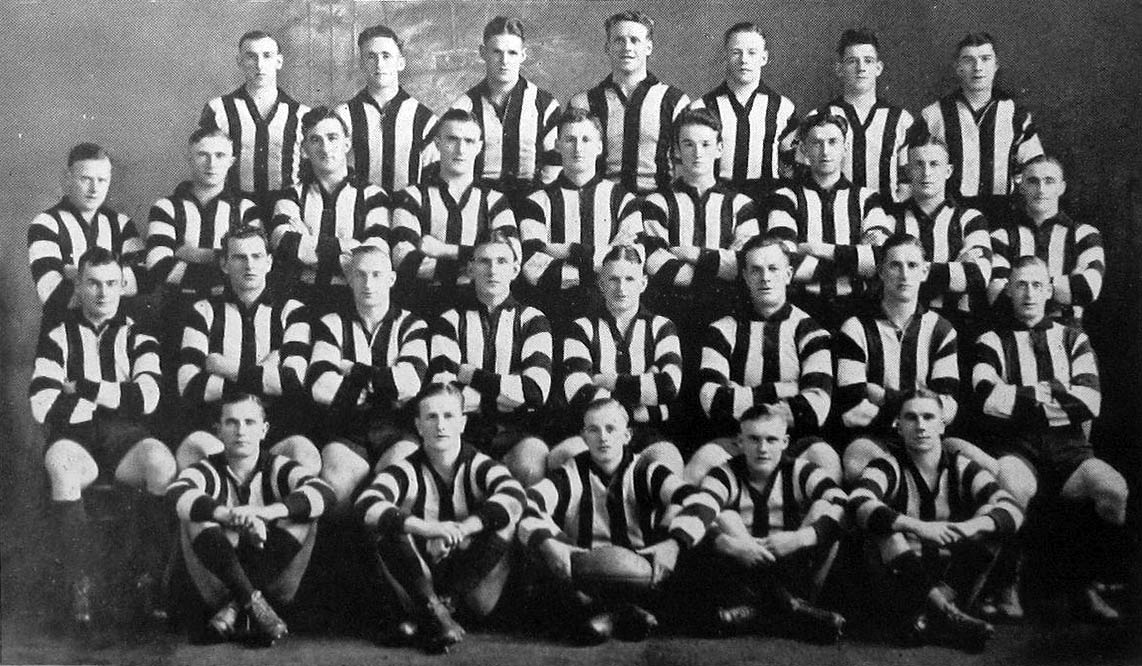
Collingwood FC team, premiers

| Team | 1 | 2 | 3 | 4 | Total |
|---|---|---|---|---|---|
| Collingwood | 1.3 | 6.6 | 8.10 | 11.12 | 11.12 (78) |
| South Melbourne | 3.6 | 4.8 | 6.10 | 7.16 | 7.16 (58) |

=== Goal kickers ===
Collingwood:

- G. Coventry 4
- Kyne 2
- Pannam 2
- H. Collier 1
- A. Collier 1
- Stackpole 1

South Melbourne:

- Davies 2
- Moore 2
- Nash 1
- Kelleher 1
- McEachen 1

== See also ==
- 1935 VFL season
