= Francis John Davis =

Francis John Davis may refer to:

- Francis Davis (1946–2025), American author and journalist.
- Frank Davis (Australian politician) (1900–1980), Australian politician

== See also ==
- Francis Davis (disambiguation)
- Frank Davis (disambiguation)
