= Frank Davies =

Frank Davies may refer to:

- Frank Davies (rugby league), rugby league footballer who played in the 1960s and 1970s
- Frank Davies (footballer, born 1903) (1903–1970), Welsh footballer
- Frank Davies (footballer, born 1910) (1910–1989), Australian rules footballer for South Melbourne
- Frank Davies (footballer, born 1907) (1907–1993), Australian rules footballer for South Melbourne
- Frank Davies (record producer) (born 1946), Canadian record producer

== See also ==
- Frank Davis (disambiguation)
- Franklin Davies (disambiguation)
- Francis Davies (disambiguation)
