= Roy McEachen =

Australian rules footballer, born 1913

Personal information
- Full name: Roy McEachen
- Born: 7 June 1913
- Died: 22 December 1937 (aged 24)
- Original team: Caulfield
- Height: 178 cm (5 ft 10 in)
- Weight: 80 kg (176 lb)

Playing career^{1}
Years	Club	Games (Goals)
1935–1936	South Melbourne	17 (1)
- ^{1} Playing statistics correct to the end of 1936.

Roy McEachen (7 June 1913 – 22 December 1937) was an Australian rules footballer who played with South Melbourne in the Victorian Football League (VFL).

McEachen first broke into the South Melbourne team in the third round of the 1935 VFL season and played in every game until round 15, when he received a four-week suspension for striking Jack Smith of North Melbourne. He returned in time to appear as South Melbourne's reserve in the 1935 VFL Grand Final and kicked the only goal of his career in the loss.

Early in 1936, McEachen left the state to take up the position of captain-coach of New South Wales club Narrandera in the South West Football League (New South Wales).

In December 1937, McEachen died after a short illness. He had moved back to Melbourne and had re-joined South Melbourne with the aim to play in the 1938 season.
