= Bob Pratt =

Australian rules footballer, born 1912

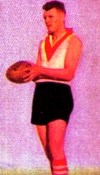

Personal information
- Full name: Harold Robert Pratt
- Born: 31 August 1912; Mitcham, Victoria
- Died: 6 January 2001 (aged 88); Frankston, Victoria
- Original team: Mitcham
- Height: 180 cm (5 ft 11 in)
- Weight: 76 kg (168 lb)
- Position: Full-forward

Playing career^{1}
Years	Club	Games (Goals)
1930–1939	South Melbourne	157 (679)
1940–1941	Coburg	40 (263)
1946	South Melbourne	1 (2)
Total		198 (944)
- ^{1} Playing statistics correct to the end of 1946.

Career highlights
- VFL premiership player: 1933; 2× VFL Leading Goalkicker Medal: 1934, 1935; Most goals in a VFL/AFL season (tied): 1934 (150 goals); 6× South Melbourne leading goalkicker: 1932, 1933, 1934, 1935, 1936, 1939; VFA Leading Goalkicker Medal: 1941; Australian Football Hall of Fame (inducted 1996 as a Legend); Swans Hall of Fame (inducted 2009 as a Bloods Legend); Swans Team of the Century (selected 2003)

Harold Robert "Bob" Pratt (31 August 1912 – 6 January 2001) was an Australian rules footballer who played for the South Melbourne Football Club in the Victorian Football League (VFL) and the Coburg Football Club in the Victorian Football Association (VFA).

Considered "arguably the best full-forward in the history of Australian rules", Pratt was one of the inaugural Legends inducted into the Australian Football Hall of Fame in 1996.

Known for spectacular diving and high-flying marks, Pratt topped South Melbourne's goalkicking for the first time in 1932 with 71 goals and for the next three seasons passed 100 goals. His total of 150 goals in 1934 was a VFL/AFL record which stood alone until Peter Hudson equalled it in 1971. Pratt also kicked ten or more goals in a game eight times, including 15 goals in a single game. His son, Bob Pratt Jr., also played for South Melbourne.

== Early life ==
The son of Harold Robert Pratt and Olive Pratt (née Fosbrook), Pratt was born in the inner-Melbourne suburb of Brunswick West on 31 August 1912. He grew up in the Melbourne suburb of Mitcham, and was known as "Bob" to avoid confusion with his father.

Playing as a junior for local club Mitcham, Pratt attracted the attention of rival VFL clubs South Melbourne and Hawthorn. Whilst Hawthorn lost interest after a poor performance by Pratt in a match, South Melbourne signed him following a recommendation from the Mitcham coach.

== South Melbourne ==
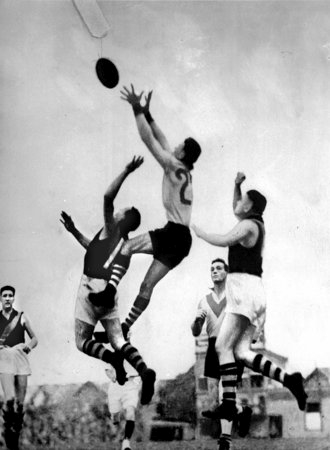
Pratt leaping for a mark over Richmond ruckman Bert Foster (11) and in front of full-back Maurie Sheahan (4) at the Lake Oval on 9 June 1934.

=== 1929 ===
Recruited from Mitcham, Pratt played his first game for the South Melbourne seconds against Hawthorn on 15 June 1929. He was one of the best on the ground in a team that won 15.16 (106) to 4.9 (33), scoring four goals.

Pratt played in the forward pocket for the seconds in the 1929 first semi-final against Essendon, and was one of the best players for South Melbourne. He was replaced in the team for the preliminary final match against Geelong by Jack Richardson, most likely because Richardson had played 10 senior matches that year, rather than due to any disappointment in Pratt's performance (it was the prevailing wisdom that it was always better to play experienced senior players in seconds finals matches); Geelong won the match.

=== 1930 ===
Pratt's senior VFL career began in the first round of the 1930 season, when—aged 17 years, 245 days—he played at centre half-forward for South Melbourne against Melbourne at South Melbourne's home ground, Lake Oval. Although South lost the match by 25 points, Pratt kicked four goals, and was considered to be his side's best player on the day.

He played the entire season of 18 home-and-away matches, kicking 43 goals for the season—his best score was five goals in round 10 against Fitzroy—and was second on South Melbourne's goalkicking list to full-forward Austin Robertson.

Pratt was thus considered to have "immense promise".

=== 1931 ===
Still playing at centre half-forward, Pratt played 15 games and kicked 23 goals, becoming the equal third highest goalkicker for South. Leading VFL footballer turned journalist Wallace Sharland complimented Pratt on his pace, stating that he had plenty of "toe". South Melbourne finished seventh with nine wins from eighteen matches.

=== 1932 ===
South Melbourne selected Roy Selleck, a recruit from Springvale, at full-forward, and selected Pratt at centre half-forward for the opening match of the 1932 season. Selleck was not a success (in fact, he only played three senior VFL games), and he was moved to the forward flank for the second match, while Pratt was moved to full-forward for the first time. In his first game as full-forward, Pratt kicked seven goals and one behind.

Pratt topped South Melbourne's goalkicking for the first time in 1932 with 71 goals, 50 of them coming by round nine. His tally broke the previous record for goals scored in a season by a South Melbourne player, held by Ted Johnson, who kicked 60 goals in each of the 1924, 1925 and 1928 seasons.

On 2 July 1932, in the round nine match against Fitzroy, playing at full-forward, Pratt kicked seven goals in a more accurate South Melbourne's 12.10 (82) win over Fitzroy 10.15 (75). The Argus noted that "Pratt was keen and accurate [up] forward", whilst The Age remarked on Pratt's "extraordinary marking and kicking". After the match, Pratt was reported by goal umpire Greenwood and boundary umpire Treloar for striking Fitzroy's back-pocket Frank Curcio in the back, near the right kidney, in the third quarter. At the VFL tribunal hearing on Thursday, 7 July 1932, the charge against Pratt was not sustained, as Curcio said that he had no recollection of having been struck. This was the only occasion that Pratt was reported in his entire VFL career.

=== 1933 ===
South Melbourne underwent a massive recruiting drive prior to the 1933 VFL season, recruiting Laurie Nash and Frank Davies from Tasmania, Wilbur Harris and Ossie Bertram from South Australia and Western Australians Joe O'Meara and John Bowe. After a slow start, the team melded well together to win the 1933 premiership. Pratt, who kicked 109 goals for the season from eighteen matches, was "idolised by all South fans ... (who) flocked to the Lake Oval and other grounds to see him in action." Pratt kicked three goals in the grand final to overtake Gordon Coventry as the VFL's leading goalkicker for the season (however, the medal was presented based on regular season tallies only).

=== 1934 ===
Pratt had a disrupted pre-season, barely training and playing only one practice match, yet he kicked eight goals in the first round against Collingwood. At the age of just 20, Pratt had already become a fan favourite at South Melbourne. Local newspaper the South Melbourne Record wrote of his performances, "Nothing gave South fans greater delight than to see Pratt soaring above the packs. The fruits of victory would not taste so sweet if Pratt failed to reap a bag of half a dozen majors."

On 19 May, in the round 3 match against Essendon at Lake Oval, Pratt set a new club record for the most goals kicked in a game by an individual player, registering 15 goals and three behinds in a 42-point win. Eight of those goals came in a ten-minute spell, a club record only broken since by Tony Lockett in 1995 (kicking 16.0). Pratt also kicked 12 goals against Footscray (including seven in a quarter) and 11 against Carlton and Essendon. He reached 100 goals for the season in the third quarter of the round 13 match against Carlton, the fewest games ever required to reach 100 goals in a season. Pratt would eventually finish the regular season with 138 goals, winning his first VFL Leading Goalkicker Medal.

South Melbourne dominated the competition throughout the season and were considered the clear favourite to win the 1934 premiership. However, in the grand final, South were outplayed by Richmond, losing by 39 points, with Pratt kicking two goals to take his season tally to 150 goals. Post-match rumours of South Melbourne players accepting bribes to play poorly were so strong that Pratt and teammate Peter Reville confronted several players they suspected of playing poorly.

Pratt's total of 150 goals in 1934 is a VFL/AFL record haul, shared with Peter Hudson, who equalled it in 1971. In addition to his 150 goals, Pratt kicked 94 behinds, which is still the record for the most behinds kicked in a season (Pratt is also second on the second on that list, having kicked 93 points in 1933).

Pratt had his best Brownlow Medal result in 1934, polling 14 votes to finish eighth, six votes behind the winner, Essendon's Dick Reynolds. For all of this, Pratt did not win South Melbourne's best and fairest award (won by Terry Brain). When Pratt asked a committee member why, he was given the response "You're very spectacular but not very effective." He did, however, receive the 2021 equivalent of A$1,133 from South Melbourne in recognition of his feat.

=== 1935 ===
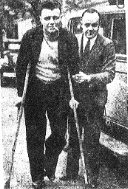
Pratt on crutches on Grand Final eve, 1935.

Pratt was again a star performer in 1935, kicking 103 goals for the year and, for the third year in a row, finished atop the VFL's goalkicking list after finals (an outstanding feat, given that his teammates Roy Moore and Laurie Nash scored 52 and 51 goals respectively for the 1935 season as well).

Following a convincing win in the second-semi final against Collingwood, when Pratt kicked six goals, South Melbourne were again considered favourite to win the premiership. However, Pratt missed the 1935 VFL grand final through bizarre circumstances. On the Thursday night prior to the game he was clipped by a truck carrying five tonnes of bricks moments after he stepped off a tram on High Street, Prahran. Pratt injured an ankle and lacerated both legs due to the accident and was unable to play.

In response to the accident, the South Melbourne Record wrote:

The initial attack on the inhabitants of Adowa by Benito Mussolini's invading army upon Emperor Haile Selassie, is no greater shock than that received by SMFC officials when they learned on Thursday afternoon, through the press, that Bob Pratt had been involved in a collision with a motor truck.

The truck driver, a South Melbourne supporter, offered Pratt a packet of cigarettes as a way of apology. In Pratt's absence, Collingwood won the grand final by 20 points.

=== 1936 ===
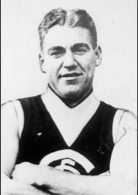
Pratt became disgruntled with South Melbourne officials, believing they gave teammates like Laurie Nash (pictured) preferential treatment.

Pratt's son Bob junior was born on 24 March 1936, and Pratt suddenly found himself unemployed when the newspaper he worked for, The Star, unexpectedly folded.

Annoyed at what he considered unfair treatment by club management towards him compared to interstate recruits, Pratt first sought to leave South Melbourne for another club in June 1936, stating that he was unemployed and believed another club could find him employment. Pratt relented when local politician Robert Williams MLC found him a job in a brewery.

Perhaps driven by his financial circumstances, Pratt was the only South Melbourne player to play in every senior game in 1936. The South Melbourne players, including Pratt, had suffered a large number of injuries over the season, and 39 different men played at least one senior game that season, an astounding figure for the day. The Age described that "of [that 39] Bob Pratt is the only one who has played in every engagement, and on occasions he has had to nurse injuries certain to have kept most other players out of the game".

In the first-round match against Melbourne, Pratt was well held by his opponent, Harry Long, who was the best Melbourne player on the day. Pratt kicked five goals and five behinds for the match; his first goal for the day came from an "amazing mark" which he took "almost on the goal line". That first goal of the 1936 season brought his VFL career total to 500 goals (in 106 matches).

=== 1937 ===
Injuries—including a split nerve that had gone undiagnosed—restricted Pratt to just six games for twelve goals in 1937, leading him to consider retirement on a number of occasions.

Pratt walked out on South Melbourne after round eight, 1937, believing club officials considered him part of the furniture and did not see it necessary to offer him the same benefits (such as travel, accommodation and employment) as his interstate teammates like Laurie Nash. Carlton attempted to recruit Pratt, offering to pay him to stand out of football while waiting for a transfer from South Melbourne. South Melbourne, however, refused to transfer him.

PRATT AND BUNTON

"Pratt depends to a great extent upon the other players of South Melbourne. Their persistent feeding, their accuracy in passing, whether low or high, and the all-round ability of the team continually bring the ball forward and give him chances.
As an individual Pratt, with his dogged determination, his battling groundwork, and his intense concentration on the ball, is a good player. Then his remarkable agility in leaving the ground, his judgment, and his uncanny knack of twisting his body to hold the ball at any angle, make him a wonderful mark.
Added to these gifts is his uncanny goal sense. Pratt amply repays the team for the assistance it gives him. He inspires the players with great confidence in all their play, because they know that their efforts in other parts of the field will not be wasted, and the value of confidence is incalculable.
In addition, Pratt gives the team a definite purpose to which to work on its forward line. A team without a set idea of how it is to proceed up forward is like a ship without a rudder.
Further, there is the psychological effect upon the other team, which is kept wondering just how it will stop this man. Altogether Pratt has a remarkable influence."

— Ivor Warne-Smith

=== 1938 ===
Pratt abandoned plans to join Carlton but continual injury problems delayed the start of his year. In April, Pratt announced he was considering a transfer to Victorian Football Association (VFA) club Preston, who were offering him £6 per week. He advised South Melbourne that, if they would continue to pay him the usual rate of £3 a week and take the risk of his breaking down, he would not consider any other offer. If, on the other hand, South Melbourne was reluctant, he announced that he would transfer to Preston and take the risk of his leg keeping him out of the game.

The full story emerged at the end of June 1938 (30 June was the closing date for clearances), when Dick Mullaly, secretary of the South Melbourne Football Club, was interviewed by Percy Taylor, sporting editor of The Argus.

Mullaly explained that Pratt had sustained an ankle injury three years earlier during the exhibition match South Melbourne had played against Collingwood, in Sydney, on 3 August 1935, and that his injury in that match was so severe that he was unable to return to the field after the half-time break. Although he received immediate treatment, he was unable to play in South Melbourne's next match, against Carlton on 10 August 1935; but he was fit enough to play against North Melbourne on 17 August 1935, two weeks later (he kicked five goals in the match). He continued to play for the rest of the season.

Then, just two days before the 1935 grand final, Pratt was hit by a truck, badly injuring the same ankle. Pratt received immediate medical attention, including intensive massage treatment, and was later taken, by South Melbourne, to a leading surgeon. As a consequence of the treatment he received, Pratt was able to play in all of the 21 games that South Melbourne played in 1936, scoring 64 goals for the season. Then, in 1937, after the match against North Melbourne on 14 June 1937, Pratt complained of pain in his badly jarred ankle; his ankle was x-rayed, and South Melbourne took him to "the best bone specialist in Melbourne", who diagnosed "arthritis". They sought a second opinion; and Pratt also continued to receive extensive massage treatment as well. Pratt did not play again in 1937.

According to Mullaly, Pratt had begun training some two months before the 1938 season had started, and had played well in some of the club's practice games, only to have complained, once again, of ankle problems. He was appointed vice-captain to Herbie Matthews two weeks before the season began. Although not playing, he was retained on South Melbourne's training list and, as a consequence, was receiving £1 a week – and only seemed to become anxious about the condition of his ankle as the closing date for clearances had approached, and had asked for the club to arrange another x-ray. Mullaly thought that it was "absurd" for Pratt to contemplate gaining a clearance to another club if, in fact, he was not fit to play for South Melbourne. The two medical men consulted by South Melbourne reported, on Friday 24 June, that Pratt had arthritis and that he must retire.

Suddenly and unexpectedly, on 28 June 1938 (two days before the VFL's clearance applications closed), Pratt appeared at South Melbourne's Tuesday night training session and, despite the medical advice that had been given to him, he declared that, despite his chronic arthritis, he wanted to play again with South Melbourne, and that he would train in earnest, and was hoping (despite his lack of condition, and his long absence from the playing field) to be selected in the next few weeks. He reported that he had previously found that "he was not inconvenienced while on the field", although he did experience great discomfort for some time after each game. He was also confident that, although he had a chronic injury, playing VFL football would not do his injury any further harm.

Pratt went on to play seven matches in 1938 (his first, against Collingwood, was in round 11, on 2 July 1938), kicking 32 goals, including nine goals against Geelong in the final round. South finished last on the ladder that season with two wins and sixteen losses.

=== 1939 ===
In 1939, Pratt played 16 games with South Melbourne, scoring 72 goals for the season. Towards the end of the season, there were many rumours that he would retire from football and, when asked, he said that he would play the last match of the season, and implied that he would be returning to South Melbourne in 1940.

== Move to Coburg ==
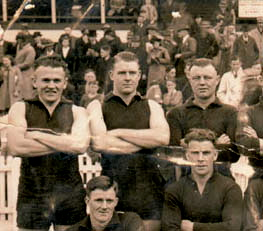
Bob Pratt (back row, right) while at Coburg in 1941

In 1940, Pratt sought a clearance to fellow VFL side Carlton. When told that he would have to stand out of VFL football for three years to do so, he signed with Coburg Football Club in the VFA, although fellow VFA side Port Melbourne, much of whose territory was shared with South Melbourne, had offered Pratt substantially more.

Also transferring to the VFA for the 1940 season was Collingwood full-forward Ron Todd, who moved to Williamstown. With former South Melbourne teammate Laurie Nash at VFA club Camberwell (and still considered amongst the best footballers in the country), and the interest generated by the VFA having legalised throwing the ball in 1938, there was talk that the VFA, traditionally the lesser of the two leagues, would now match the VFL for crowds.

During his time in the VFA, Pratt continued his incredible goal scoring record, kicking 183 goals during 1941 (a mark bettered only once in VFA/VFL history, by Ron Todd in 1945), including 22 goals in a game against Sandringham. In all, Pratt played 40 games for Coburg, kicking 263 goals.

== War service ==
On 26 February 1942, Pratt enlisted in the Royal Australian Air Force (RAAF), serving as a corporal in the 7th Medical Receiving Station, defending airfields in the Pacific and in Borneo.

While in service, Pratt had the opportunity to play football, representing the Stores team in the RAAF competition. Playing at full-forward, Pratt helped Stores to the 1942 RAAF premiership, kicking three goals in the grand final against the "Rookies".

Pratt was discharged on 14 November 1945.

== Post-war career ==
Returning from overseas duty, Pratt sought to play for South Melbourne in 1945 but was posted north by the RAAF and did not play during the season.

Pratt then caused a sensation when he attempted a comeback with South Melbourne in 1946 aged 33; he was reported to be marking and kicking at full-forward "in something like his old style" during the pre-season practice matches.

Freely granted a clearance from the VFA back to South Melbourne, and looking exceedingly well and seeming keen to play at his best, Pratt kicked two early goals in his return match against Carlton in the first round of the 1946 season. The match turned out to be a comparatively entertaining display of football, but also rather tame and blood-less compared with the teams' last meeting in the 1945 "Bloodbath" grand final. During the match, Pratt received a career-ending leg injury.

Interviewed at the time, Pratt said, "I'm playing only for the money", but when his wife Olive interrupted and said that he would still play for nothing, Pratt replied, "Well, she might be right, too."

Asked late in life why he never coached, Pratt replied, "It was no trouble to me to do things that the ordinary bloke couldn't do, but if he didn't do it, I couldn't understand why."

== Personal life ==
Pratt married Olive Sundstrom on 24 August 1935 at All Saints Church of England in St Kilda, after playing against Geelong earlier that day. His teammate James Reid was best man. Over a thousand people attended the wedding, with a further 400 people outside, jostling to see the couple. Two constables were required to keep the crowd away from the church doors, and pickpockets took advantage of the crush of people to steal from the crowd.

Pratt had a son, Bob Jr., who also played for South Melbourne, but, following a string of injuries, he retired due to increased business pressures.

Pratt worked at various times for the Melbourne Star newspaper, as an inspector of news agencies and as a sales representative for soft drink companies, as well as writing a football column for The Argus newspaper. He also raced greyhounds and played competitive lawn bowls.

Following a long illness, Pratt died on 6 January 2001 at Frankston Hospital.

== Style ==
"Pratt is my choice because he could almost do the impossible. Often he flew for the ball from almost an impossible position— perhaps on the outside of three players, and then, with an amazing twist of his body, he appeared to get his hands to the ball at an angle of 45 degrees.
Many times photographers have shown Pratt as high as an opponent's shoulder.
Pratt was not only a freak mark. He could kick goals from 60 yards out or more, and he could do it on the run and on the turn. Closer to goal his snap-shooting was remarkable.
Pratt too often had to make his own opportunities, because he was not fed by every player in front of him. In 1934 he kicked 150 goals – still a League record – and in the same season the centre-half forward kicked more than 60…
I am convinced that Pratt – the artist or freak – has no master."

— Percy Taylor

Pratt was averse to weights training, believing that it took away from the athleticism required to play football. Instead, he trained with professional sprinters, which he believed helped him as it built his initial acceleration (essential to any footballer) and aided his kicking accuracy.

His contemporaries were full of praise for his exploits:

- South Melbourne teammate Laurie Nash once wrote of Pratt; "He was the greatest high mark I have ever seen. How he didn't kill himself in some of his marking efforts I will never know."
- Richmond legend Jack Dyer wrote that it would be difficult to convey Pratt's greatness to future generations of football fans who had not been privileged to see him in action.
- Three-time Brownlow Medal winner Dick Reynolds of Essendon wrote that Pratt was the best forward he had seen, saying that "none rivalled the greatness" of Pratt, adding that he was a master of judgement and long kicking. Of his high-marking skills, Reynolds recalled that Pratt "[would] be waist-up over the whole bloomin' pack sometimes, then he'd almost slide over the top of the squad, swing around over the pack and as he came down you'd think he'd break his neck, but lucky for him he knew how to fall and roll like a cat so he didn't hurt himself."
- Jack Regan, Collingwood's champion full-back of the 1930s, said that, in all of his years playing senior VFL football, Pratt was his most difficult opponent, and that he stood out from all the other full-forwards he had played against: "The greatness of Pratt apart from his brilliant marking and fine kicking was his determined ground play. When beaten for the mark he would dash for the ball like a terrier".
- In the opinion of the former West Australian champion rover Johnny Leonard, who had been the captain coach of South Melbourne in 1932 (he played 12 VFL games with South Melbourne in 1932), Pratt was a champion: "I think Pratt was the most freakish footballer I ever saw. He was more freakish than Ted Flemming, and that's saying something. He had a heart as big as a grandstand and stood up to heavy punishment as well as risking a broken neck in his phenomenal leaps for the ball. He was a great footballer".

== Honours and legacy ==
Sydney named its Leading Goalkicker Award the "Bob Pratt Trophy" for a period in the early 1990s.

In 1996, Pratt was named as an inaugural member of the Australian Football Hall of Fame and, along with 11 other greats of the game, was immediately elevated to "Legend" status, the highest honour in Australian football.

In 2000, Pratt was named at full-forward in Coburg's Team of the Century".

At the time of his death in 2001, Pratt was the last living member of the Swans 1933 grand final team.

In 2003, Pratt was named beside Tony Lockett in the forward pocket in their official Team of the Century.

In 2009, Along with Bob Skilton and Paul Kelly, Pratt was inaugurated into the Swans Hall of Fame as a "Bloods Legend".
