= Frank Davis =

Frank Davis may refer to:

== Politics ==
- Frank R. Davis (1888–1948), politician in Nova Scotia, Canada
- Frank Davis (Australian politician) (1900–1980), member of the Australian House of Representatives
- Frank W. Davis (1936–2018), member of the Oklahoma House of Representatives
- Frank Davis (New Hampshire politician), member of the New Hampshire House of Representatives
- Frank Davis (Liberal politician) (1920–?), British politician, mayor of Finchley

== Sports ==
- Bunch Davis (Frank Davis, fl. 1906–1911), American baseball player
- Frank Davis (cricketer) (1904–1973), Australian cricketer
- Frank Davis (sports administrator) (1921–2006)
- Frank Davis (Australian rules footballer) (born 1944)
- Frank Davis (American football) (born 1981), gridiron football guard

== Others ==
- F. A. Davis (1850–1917), American publisher and entrepreneur
- Frank Marshall Davis (1905–1987), African-American journalist and writer
- Frank H. Davis (1910–1979), Vermont businessman and public official
- Frank Davis (serial killer) (1953–2008), American serial killer
- Frank Davis (Scout) (1923–1940), English Boy Scout awarded a posthumous Bronze Cross
- Frank Davis (screenwriter), screenwriter of A Tree Grows in Brooklyn
- Frank Joseph Davis (1942–2013), radio and television personality in New Orleans, Louisiana

== See also ==
- Francis Davis (disambiguation)
- Franklin Davis (disambiguation)
- Frank Davies (disambiguation)
