= Franklin Davies =

Franklin Davies may refer to:

- Franklin Davies in Spaghetti House siege
- Franklin O. Davies, writer

== See also ==
- Frank Davies (disambiguation)
- Franklin Davis (disambiguation)
