= Francis Davis (disambiguation) =

Francis Davis (1946–2025) was an American author and journalist.

Francis Davis may also refer to:

- Francis Davis (poet) (1810–1881), Irish poet and editor
- Sir Francis Boileau Davis, 2nd Baronet (1871–1896), of the Davis baronets
- Francis Pierpont Davis (1884–1953), American architect and Olympic gold medalist
- Francis W. Davis, inventor of power steering

== See also ==
- Frank Davis (disambiguation)
- Francis Davies (disambiguation)
