= Franklin Davis =

Franklin Davis may refer to:

- Franklin A. Davis (born 1939), American chemist
- Franklin M. Davis Jr. (1918–1980), major general in the United States Army
- Franklin Pierpont Davis (1884–1953), American architect and Gold medal olympian

== See also ==
- Frank Davis (disambiguation)
- Franklin Davies (disambiguation)
