= Colin Benham =

Australian rules footballer

Personal information
- Full name: Colin Sampson Benham
- Born: 23 November 1907; Collingwood, Victoria
- Died: 22 February 2000 (aged 92); Geelong, Victoria
- Original team: Hamilton

Playing career^{1}
Years	Club	Games (Goals)
1930–1936	Fitzroy	81 (70)
- ^{1} Playing statistics correct to the end of 1936.

Colin Sampson Benham (23 November 1907 – 22 February 2000) was an Australian rules footballer, who played for Fitzroy Football Club in the Victorian Football League (VFL).

== Fitzroy ==
Recruited from Hamilton Football Club, Colin was a solid, hard working ruckman who was known for his stamina and his good mark. He was particularly valuable when resting in the forward lines, and combined well with champion rover Haydn Bunton, (who started playing with Fitzroy in 1931).

Colin played 81 senior games for Fitzroy between 1930 and 1936, and kicked 70 goals.

== Benham's famous "in-off the small boy" goal ==
On Saturday 30 June 1934, Fitzroy were playing against South Melbourne at the Lake Oval in front of a crowd of 27,000, plus Baron Huntingfield, who served as Governor of Victoria from 1934 to 1939, who had come to see his first match of Australian Rules Football.

With only seconds remaining, South Melbourne led Fitzroy 13.19 (97) to 12.10 (82). Benham took a mark close to the goals, and went back to line up his kick. The final bell rang and by the time he had started his run-in, most of his teammates had begun to leave the field. As the ball left his boot, some boys had started to jump the fence and run on to congratulate the South Melbourne players, unaware that the match was not yet officially over. The ball veered sideways off Benham's boot, and from his perspective it was clear that it would be a behind; but, as the ball neared the goal-line, it struck one of the running boys and was deflected between the goalposts. Because the football had not hit another player, the goal umpire had no alternative but to award the goal (6 points), rather than the behind (1 point) that it would otherwise have been, and South Melbourne's winning margin was reduced to nine points: 13.19 (97) to 13.10 (88).
