= Reg Humphries =

Australian rules footballer, born 1911

Personal information
- Full name: Reginald Charles Humphries
- Born: 1 August 1911
- Died: 22 October 1986 (aged 75)
- Original team: Northcote
- Height: 180 cm (5 ft 11 in)
- Weight: 81 kg (179 lb)

Playing career^{1}
Years	Club	Games (Goals)
1934–1939	South Melbourne	68 (8)
- ^{1} Playing statistics correct to the end of 1939.

Reginald Charles Humphries (1 August 1911 – 22 October 1986) was an Australian rules footballer who played with South Melbourne in the Victorian Football League (VFL).

Humphries, a defender, joined South Melbourne from Northcote. He was in the back pocket for South Melbourne in the 1935 VFL Grand Final, which they lost to Collingwood by 20 points.

He served with the Royal Australian Air Force in World War II.
