= 1934 VFL season =

38th season of the Victorian Football League (VFL)

1934 VFL premiership season
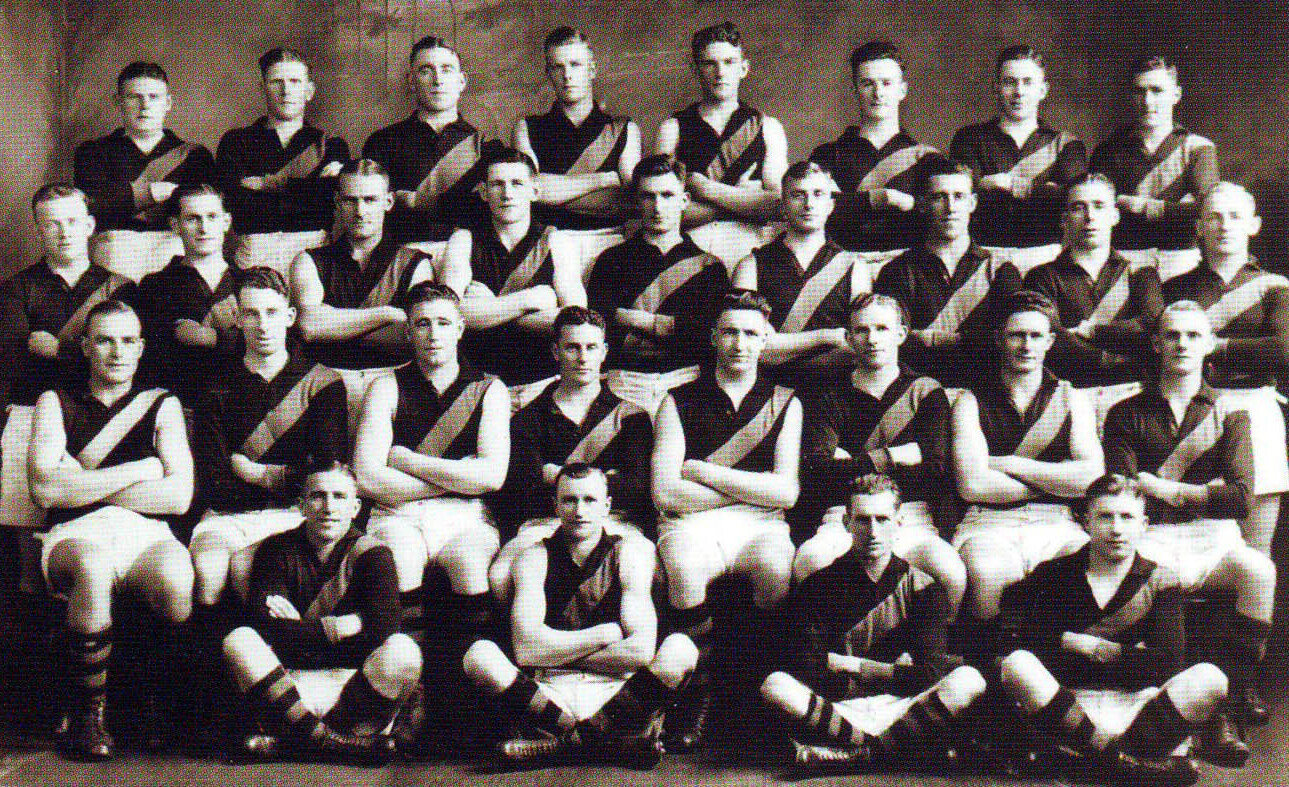
- Richmond 1934 VFL premiership team

Overview
- Date: 5 May – 13 October 1934
- Teams: 12
- Premiers: Richmond; 4th premiership
- Runners-up: South Melbourne; 5th runners-up result
- Brownlow Medallist: Dick Reynolds (Essendon); 19 votes
- Leading goalkicker medallist: Bob Pratt (South Melbourne); 138 goals

Attendance
- Matches played: 112
- Total attendance: 1,899,507 (16,960 per match)
- Highest (H&A): 45,000 (round 13, Carlton v South Melbourne)
- Highest (finals): 65,335 (grand final, Richmond v South Melbourne)

The 1934 VFL season was the 38th season of the Victorian Football League (VFL), the highest-level senior Australian rules football competition in Victoria. The season featured twelve clubs and ran from 5 May to 13 October, comprising an 18-match home-and-away season followed by a four-week finals series featuring the top four clubs.

Richmond won the premiership, defeating South Melbourne by 39 points in the 1934 VFL grand final; it was Richmond's fourth VFL premiership. Richmond won the minor premiership by finishing atop the home-and-away ladder with a 15–3 win–loss record. Essendon's Dick Reynolds won the Brownlow Medal as the league's best and fairest player, and South Melbourne's Bob Pratt won his second consecutive leading goalkicker medal as the league's leading goalkicker; Pratt's 150 goals for the season (including finals) is a league record that has only been equalled once, in 1971.

== Background ==
In 1934, the VFL competition consisted of twelve teams of 18 on-the-field players each, plus one substitute player, known as the 19th man. A player could be substituted for any reason; however, once substituted, a player could not return to the field of play under any circumstances.

Teams played each other in a home-and-away season of 18 rounds; matches 12 to 18 were the "home-and-way reverse" of matches 1 to 7.

Once the 18 round home-and-away season had finished, the 1934 VFL Premiers were determined by the specific format and conventions of the Page–McIntyre system.

== Home-and-away season ==
=== Round 1 ===
| Home team | Home team score | Away team | Away team score | Venue | Crowd | Date |
|---|---|---|---|---|---|---|
| Geelong | 16.13 (109) | St Kilda | 11.7 (73) | Corio Oval | 15,000 | 5 May 1934 |
| Fitzroy | 11.16 (82) | North Melbourne | 10.11 (71) | Brunswick Street Oval | 21,000 | 5 May 1934 |
| Essendon | 19.11 (125) | Footscray | 16.18 (114) | Windy Hill | 21,000 | 5 May 1934 |
| Richmond | 18.14 (122) | Melbourne | 12.9 (81) | Punt Road Oval | 17,000 | 5 May 1934 |
| South Melbourne | 19.13 (127) | Collingwood | 13.14 (92) | Lake Oval | 38,000 | 5 May 1934 |
| Hawthorn | 12.8 (80) | Carlton | 17.26 (128) | Glenferrie Oval | 17,000 | 5 May 1934 |

=== Round 2 ===
| Home team | Home team score | Away team | Away team score | Venue | Crowd | Date |
|---|---|---|---|---|---|---|
| Collingwood | 17.12 (114) | Essendon | 13.8 (86) | Victoria Park | 17,500 | 12 May 1934 |
| Carlton | 17.20 (122) | South Melbourne | 17.17 (119) | Princes Park | 45,000 | 12 May 1934 |
| St Kilda | 12.11 (83) | Richmond | 13.9 (87) | Junction Oval | 24,000 | 12 May 1934 |
| Melbourne | 20.13 (133) | Hawthorn | 6.8 (44) | MCG | 9,842 | 12 May 1934 |
| North Melbourne | 10.10 (70) | Geelong | 10.17 (77) | Arden Street Oval | 14,000 | 12 May 1934 |
| Footscray | 14.12 (96) | Fitzroy | 9.18 (72) | Western Oval | 16,000 | 12 May 1934 |

=== Round 3 ===
| Home team | Home team score | Away team | Away team score | Venue | Crowd | Date |
|---|---|---|---|---|---|---|
| Geelong | 12.14 (86) | Melbourne | 6.11 (47) | Corio Oval | 13,000 | 19 May 1934 |
| Fitzroy | 11.14 (80) | St Kilda | 13.15 (93) | Brunswick Street Oval | 19,000 | 19 May 1934 |
| North Melbourne | 8.14 (62) | Footscray | 10.17 (77) | Arden Street Oval | 17,000 | 19 May 1934 |
| South Melbourne | 23.10 (148) | Essendon | 15.16 (106) | Lake Oval | 20,000 | 19 May 1934 |
| Hawthorn | 9.8 (62) | Collingwood | 19.15 (129) | Glenferrie Oval | 8,000 | 19 May 1934 |
| Richmond | 14.20 (104) | Carlton | 9.13 (67) | Punt Road Oval | 37,000 | 19 May 1934 |

=== Round 4 ===
| Home team | Home team score | Away team | Away team score | Venue | Crowd | Date |
|---|---|---|---|---|---|---|
| Footscray | 12.12 (84) | South Melbourne | 17.18 (120) | Western Oval | 21,000 | 26 May 1934 |
| Essendon | 15.13 (103) | Hawthorn | 13.11 (89) | Windy Hill | 10,000 | 26 May 1934 |
| Collingwood | 13.13 (91) | Richmond | 9.9 (63) | Victoria Park | 26,000 | 26 May 1934 |
| Carlton | 15.14 (104) | Geelong | 14.10 (94) | Princes Park | 30,000 | 26 May 1934 |
| St Kilda | 14.18 (102) | North Melbourne | 10.20 (80) | Junction Oval | 18,000 | 26 May 1934 |
| Melbourne | 9.11 (65) | Fitzroy | 8.11 (59) | MCG | 15,864 | 26 May 1934 |

=== Round 5 ===
| Home team | Home team score | Away team | Away team score | Venue | Crowd | Date |
|---|---|---|---|---|---|---|
| Hawthorn | 13.14 (92) | South Melbourne | 22.12 (144) | Glenferrie Oval | 12,000 | 2 June 1934 |
| St Kilda | 22.23 (155) | Footscray | 11.18 (84) | Junction Oval | 25,000 | 2 June 1934 |
| Fitzroy | 15.12 (102) | Carlton | 12.15 (87) | Brunswick Street Oval | 26,500 | 2 June 1934 |
| North Melbourne | 17.14 (116) | Melbourne | 15.28 (118) | Arden Street Oval | 17,000 | 4 June 1934 |
| Richmond | 15.12 (102) | Essendon | 12.8 (80) | Punt Road Oval | 24,500 | 4 June 1934 |
| Geelong | 16.13 (109) | Collingwood | 16.13 (109) | Corio Oval | 21,500 | 4 June 1934 |

- Collingwood's Gordon Coventry kicked his 1,000th goal for his career in the game against Geelong.

=== Round 6 ===
| Home team | Home team score | Away team | Away team score | Venue | Crowd | Date |
|---|---|---|---|---|---|---|
| Melbourne | 14.17 (101) | St Kilda | 20.14 (134) | MCG | 18,102 | 9 June 1934 |
| Essendon | 14.11 (95) | Geelong | 11.16 (82) | Windy Hill | 15,000 | 9 June 1934 |
| Collingwood | 16.15 (111) | Fitzroy | 13.18 (96) | Victoria Park | 22,000 | 9 June 1934 |
| Carlton | 20.25 (145) | North Melbourne | 12.11 (83) | Princes Park | 15,000 | 9 June 1934 |
| South Melbourne | 9.10 (64) | Richmond | 16.12 (108) | Lake Oval | 32,000 | 9 June 1934 |
| Hawthorn | 11.11 (77) | Footscray | 10.11 (71) | Glenferrie Oval | 8,000 | 9 June 1934 |

=== Round 7 ===
| Home team | Home team score | Away team | Away team score | Venue | Crowd | Date |
|---|---|---|---|---|---|---|
| Geelong | 15.16 (106) | South Melbourne | 11.11 (77) | Corio Oval | 14,200 | 23 June 1934 |
| Footscray | 6.8 (44) | Melbourne | 13.13 (91) | Western Oval | 11,000 | 23 June 1934 |
| Richmond | 16.14 (110) | Hawthorn | 11.15 (81) | Punt Road Oval | 10,000 | 23 June 1934 |
| Fitzroy | 15.12 (102) | Essendon | 14.13 (97) | Brunswick Street Oval | 19,000 | 23 June 1934 |
| North Melbourne | 12.14 (86) | Collingwood | 16.16 (112) | Arden Street Oval | 11,000 | 23 June 1934 |
| St Kilda | 16.12 (108) | Carlton | 24.22 (166) | Junction Oval | 33,000 | 23 June 1934 |

=== Round 8 ===
| Home team | Home team score | Away team | Away team score | Venue | Crowd | Date |
|---|---|---|---|---|---|---|
| Essendon | 29.16 (190) | North Melbourne | 15.13 (103) | Windy Hill | 12,000 | 30 June 1934 |
| Collingwood | 12.12 (84) | St Kilda | 10.15 (75) | Victoria Park | 15,000 | 30 June 1934 |
| Carlton | 19.20 (134) | Melbourne | 11.19 (85) | Princes Park | 20,000 | 30 June 1934 |
| Hawthorn | 11.12 (78) | Geelong | 17.17 (119) | Glenferrie Oval | 6,000 | 30 June 1934 |
| Richmond | 9.10 (64) | Footscray | 6.12 (48) | Punt Road Oval | 14,000 | 30 June 1934 |
| South Melbourne | 13.19 (97) | Fitzroy | 13.10 (88) | Lake Oval | 27,000 | 30 June 1934 |

=== Round 9 ===
| Home team | Home team score | Away team | Away team score | Venue | Crowd | Date |
|---|---|---|---|---|---|---|
| North Melbourne | 7.4 (46) | South Melbourne | 20.18 (138) | Arden Street Oval | 11,000 | 7 July 1934 |
| Geelong | 7.13 (55) | Richmond | 4.9 (33) | Corio Oval | 16,500 | 7 July 1934 |
| Fitzroy | 13.21 (99) | Hawthorn | 11.13 (79) | Brunswick Street Oval | 9,000 | 7 July 1934 |
| St Kilda | 11.8 (74) | Essendon | 7.16 (58) | Junction Oval | 20,000 | 7 July 1934 |
| Melbourne | 8.15 (63) | Collingwood | 8.17 (65) | MCG | 13,807 | 7 July 1934 |
| Footscray | 12.11 (83) | Carlton | 15.17 (107) | Western Oval | 12,500 | 7 July 1934 |

=== Round 10 ===
| Home team | Home team score | Away team | Away team score | Venue | Crowd | Date |
|---|---|---|---|---|---|---|
| Hawthorn | 6.17 (53) | North Melbourne | 6.12 (48) | Glenferrie Oval | 6,000 | 14 July 1934 |
| Essendon | 6.15 (51) | Melbourne | 8.12 (60) | Windy Hill | 9,000 | 14 July 1934 |
| South Melbourne | 15.20 (110) | St Kilda | 7.4 (46) | Lake Oval | 24,000 | 14 July 1934 |
| Geelong | 13.15 (93) | Footscray | 9.10 (64) | Corio Oval | 11,000 | 14 July 1934 |
| Richmond | 10.16 (76) | Fitzroy | 9.9 (63) | Punt Road Oval | 17,500 | 14 July 1934 |
| Collingwood | 13.17 (95) | Carlton | 10.5 (65) | Victoria Park | 25,000 | 14 July 1934 |

=== Round 11 ===
| Home team | Home team score | Away team | Away team score | Venue | Crowd | Date |
|---|---|---|---|---|---|---|
| North Melbourne | 11.12 (78) | Richmond | 15.9 (99) | Arden Street Oval | 6,000 | 21 July 1934 |
| Melbourne | 14.15 (99) | South Melbourne | 22.23 (155) | MCG | 21,785 | 21 July 1934 |
| Fitzroy | 10.11 (71) | Geelong | 14.18 (102) | Brunswick Street Oval | 15,000 | 21 July 1934 |
| Carlton | 22.16 (148) | Essendon | 16.13 (109) | Princes Park | 23,000 | 21 July 1934 |
| St Kilda | 13.10 (88) | Hawthorn | 10.12 (72) | Junction Oval | 10,000 | 21 July 1934 |
| Footscray | 14.11 (95) | Collingwood | 16.9 (105) | Western Oval | 12,500 | 21 July 1934 |

=== Round 12 ===
| Home team | Home team score | Away team | Away team score | Venue | Crowd | Date |
|---|---|---|---|---|---|---|
| Melbourne | 13.23 (101) | Richmond | 14.11 (95) | MCG | 13,805 | 28 July 1934 |
| Collingwood | 13.19 (97) | South Melbourne | 21.19 (145) | Victoria Park | 28,000 | 28 July 1934 |
| Carlton | 22.13 (145) | Hawthorn | 10.6 (66) | Princes Park | 12,000 | 28 July 1934 |
| St Kilda | 13.6 (84) | Geelong | 16.18 (114) | Junction Oval | 17,000 | 28 July 1934 |
| North Melbourne | 15.8 (98) | Fitzroy | 21.16 (142) | Arden Street Oval | 10,000 | 28 July 1934 |
| Footscray | 15.9 (99) | Essendon | 8.9 (57) | Western Oval | 13,000 | 28 July 1934 |

=== Round 13 ===
| Home team | Home team score | Away team | Away team score | Venue | Crowd | Date |
|---|---|---|---|---|---|---|
| Richmond | 7.25 (67) | St Kilda | 5.8 (38) | Punt Road Oval | 16,000 | 4 August 1934 |
| Hawthorn | 11.7 (73) | Melbourne | 10.16 (76) | Glenferrie Oval | 6,000 | 4 August 1934 |
| Geelong | 18.15 (123) | North Melbourne | 5.12 (42) | Corio Oval | 7,000 | 4 August 1934 |
| Fitzroy | 10.18 (78) | Footscray | 10.12 (72) | Brunswick Street Oval | 14,000 | 4 August 1934 |
| Essendon | 15.12 (102) | Collingwood | 22.18 (150) | Windy Hill | 11,000 | 4 August 1934 |
| South Melbourne | 23.13 (151) | Carlton | 17.8 (110) | Lake Oval | 30,000 | 4 August 1934 |

=== Round 14 ===
| Home team | Home team score | Away team | Away team score | Venue | Crowd | Date |
|---|---|---|---|---|---|---|
| Footscray | 10.18 (78) | North Melbourne | 6.14 (50) | Western Oval | 5,000 | 18 August 1934 |
| Essendon | 9.17 (71) | South Melbourne | 22.14 (146) | Windy Hill | 15,000 | 18 August 1934 |
| Collingwood | 23.22 (160) | Hawthorn | 10.13 (73) | Victoria Park | 5,000 | 18 August 1934 |
| Carlton | 14.12 (96) | Richmond | 16.13 (109) | Princes Park | 30,000 | 18 August 1934 |
| Melbourne | 13.10 (88) | Geelong | 21.15 (141) | MCG | 12,163 | 18 August 1934 |
| St Kilda | 13.11 (89) | Fitzroy | 10.10 (70) | Junction Oval | 10,000 | 18 August 1934 |

=== Round 15 ===
| Home team | Home team score | Away team | Away team score | Venue | Crowd | Date |
|---|---|---|---|---|---|---|
| North Melbourne | 11.13 (79) | St Kilda | 12.12 (84) | Arden Street Oval | 5,000 | 25 August 1934 |
| Fitzroy | 20.19 (139) | Melbourne | 16.10 (106) | Brunswick Street Oval | 9,500 | 25 August 1934 |
| South Melbourne | 23.18 (156) | Footscray | 9.16 (70) | Lake Oval | 17,420 | 25 August 1934 |
| Hawthorn | 11.15 (81) | Essendon | 11.13 (79) | Glenferrie Oval | 5,000 | 25 August 1934 |
| Richmond | 12.14 (86) | Collingwood | 11.9 (75) | Punt Road Oval | 26,500 | 25 August 1934 |
| Geelong | 13.17 (95) | Carlton | 10.10 (70) | Corio Oval | 18,500 | 25 August 1934 |

=== Round 16 ===
| Home team | Home team score | Away team | Away team score | Venue | Crowd | Date |
|---|---|---|---|---|---|---|
| Melbourne | 11.24 (90) | North Melbourne | 7.15 (57) | MCG | 5,011 | 1 September 1934 |
| Footscray | 13.20 (98) | St Kilda | 10.17 (77) | Western Oval | 5,500 | 1 September 1934 |
| Essendon | 13.12 (90) | Richmond | 15.23 (113) | Windy Hill | 10,000 | 1 September 1934 |
| Collingwood | 16.16 (112) | Geelong | 16.21 (117) | Victoria Park | 18,000 | 1 September 1934 |
| Carlton | 18.12 (120) | Fitzroy | 9.15 (69) | Princes Park | 15,500 | 1 September 1934 |
| South Melbourne | 15.11 (101) | Hawthorn | 10.10 (70) | Lake Oval | 13,000 | 1 September 1934 |

=== Round 17 ===
| Home team | Home team score | Away team | Away team score | Venue | Crowd | Date |
|---|---|---|---|---|---|---|
| Richmond | 14.14 (98) | South Melbourne | 13.14 (92) | Punt Road Oval | 40,000 | 8 September 1934 |
| Footscray | 14.18 (102) | Hawthorn | 12.7 (79) | Western Oval | 5,000 | 8 September 1934 |
| St Kilda | 13.12 (90) | Melbourne | 12.16 (88) | Junction Oval | 8,000 | 8 September 1934 |
| Geelong | 21.31 (157) | Essendon | 6.5 (41) | Corio Oval | 9,500 | 8 September 1934 |
| Fitzroy | 14.17 (101) | Collingwood | 16.10 (106) | Brunswick Street Oval | 15,000 | 8 September 1934 |
| North Melbourne | 8.8 (56) | Carlton | 7.16 (58) | Arden Street Oval | 8,000 | 8 September 1934 |

=== Round 18 ===
| Home team | Home team score | Away team | Away team score | Venue | Crowd | Date |
|---|---|---|---|---|---|---|
| Hawthorn | 7.9 (51) | Richmond | 11.16 (82) | Glenferrie Oval | 4,000 | 15 September 1934 |
| Essendon | 14.11 (95) | Fitzroy | 12.4 (76) | Windy Hill | 5,000 | 15 September 1934 |
| Collingwood | 15.18 (108) | North Melbourne | 2.8 (20) | Victoria Park | 4,000 | 15 September 1934 |
| Carlton | 16.18 (114) | St Kilda | 15.9 (99) | Princes Park | 10,000 | 15 September 1934 |
| South Melbourne | 13.19 (97) | Geelong | 8.7 (55) | Lake Oval | 17,000 | 15 September 1934 |
| Melbourne | 19.17 (131) | Footscray | 9.11 (65) | MCG | 4,232 | 15 September 1934 |

== Ladder ==
| (P) | Premiers |
| | Qualified for finals |

| # | Team | P | W | L | D | PF | PA | % | Pts |
|---|---|---|---|---|---|---|---|---|---|
| 1 | Richmond (P) | 18 | 15 | 3 | 0 | 1618 | 1334 | 121.3 | 60 |
| 2 | Geelong | 18 | 14 | 3 | 1 | 1834 | 1355 | 135.4 | 58 |
| 3 | South Melbourne | 18 | 14 | 4 | 0 | 2187 | 1560 | 140.2 | 56 |
| 4 | Collingwood | 18 | 13 | 4 | 1 | 1915 | 1571 | 121.9 | 54 |
| 5 | Carlton | 18 | 12 | 6 | 0 | 1986 | 1707 | 116.3 | 48 |
| 6 | Melbourne | 18 | 9 | 9 | 0 | 1623 | 1670 | 97.2 | 36 |
| 7 | St Kilda | 18 | 9 | 9 | 0 | 1592 | 1661 | 95.8 | 36 |
| 8 | Fitzroy | 18 | 7 | 11 | 0 | 1589 | 1660 | 95.7 | 28 |
| 9 | Footscray | 18 | 6 | 12 | 0 | 1444 | 1699 | 85.0 | 24 |
| 10 | Essendon | 18 | 5 | 13 | 0 | 1635 | 1958 | 83.5 | 20 |
| 11 | Hawthorn | 18 | 3 | 15 | 0 | 1300 | 1917 | 67.8 | 12 |
| 12 | North Melbourne | 18 | 0 | 18 | 0 | 1245 | 1876 | 66.4 | 0 |

Rules for classification: 1. premiership points; 2. percentage; 3. points for
Average score: 92.4
Source: AFL Tables

== Finals series ==
=== Semi-finals ===
| Home team | Score | Away team | Score | Venue | Crowd | Date |
|---|---|---|---|---|---|---|
| South Melbourne | 12.12 (78) | Collingwood | 9.21 (75) | MCG | 52,022 | 22 September |
| Richmond | 19.20 (134) | Geelong | 7.8 (50) | MCG | 35,934 | 29 September |

=== Preliminary final ===
| Home team | Score | Away team | Score | Venue | Crowd | Date |
|---|---|---|---|---|---|---|
| Geelong | 7.6 (48) | South Melbourne | 15.18 (108) | MCG | 30,400 | 6 October |

== Season notes ==
- Bob Pratt kicked 150 goals in the 1934 season, reaching his hundredth in only 13 matches. The feat smashed Gordon Coventry's record of 124 goals in the 1929 season, and has yet to be broken.
- Gordon Coventry's second goal of the Round 5 game between Collingwood and Geelong was his 1000th career goal, making him the first player to reach that milestone.
- In the interstate match on 11 August, the regular South Melbourne centre half-back Laurie Nash played at full-forward for Victoria for three-quarters (the selected full-forward Bill Mohr had broken his finger in the first quarter) and kicked 18 goals in a single match against South Australia at the Melbourne Cricket Ground. Nash had kicked two goals from centre half-forward in the first quarter prior to Mohr's injury, then kicked two more in the second quarter, before dominating the match after half-time with another 14 goals.
- In Round 8, Fitzroy ruckman Colin Benham scored his famous "in-off the small boy" goal.
- In the third quarter of the 14 July (round 10 match) between Carlton and Collingwood, played at Victoria Park in a heavy cross-wind, Syd Coventry, playing in his 222nd match in his last season for Collingwood, was knocked out after an altercation with Carlton's Gordon Mackie.
  - As Coventry was being stretchered off the field, a vicious brawl broke out involving 20 players – requiring the assistance of team officials and the police to break it up – in which up to ten players were seriously injured.
  - Three Carlton players were reported: Gordon Mackie was charged with striking Syd Coventry, Harry Maskell was charged with striking Norm Le Brun, and the Carlton captain, Maurie Johnson, was charged with kicking Jack Ross.
  - Many of those who had attended the match were astonished that no Collingwood players had been reported for their violent behaviour during the match.
  - The VFL tribunal found both Maskell and Mackie guilty, and suspended each for six matches. The hearing against Mackie was postponed for a week so that Coventry could attend.
  - The charge against Johnson was not sustained (although the tribunal was satisfied Johnson had kicked Ross, it was not satisfied that he had kicked Ross deliberately).
  - Although the field umpire, Bob Scott, was fortunate to escape sanction for his widely attested incompetence, one of the goal umpires, Percy Jory, and both of the boundary umpires, John Campbell and George Calleson, were suspended for the remainder of the season for their dereliction of duty in relation to the brawl.
- It is a matter of record that Dick Reynolds won the 1934 Brownlow Medal from Haydn Bunton, Sr by a single vote. Legend has it that Bunton, who had dominated in the last match of the season, tried to "suck up to" field umpire Jack McMurray as he walked off the playing field, and that Murray, sensing a blatant and improper attempt to influence his Brownlow voting, cast his votes for three other players.

== Awards ==
- The 1934 VFL Premiership team was Richmond.
- The VFL's leading goalkicker was Bob Pratt of South Melbourne with 138 goals (150 after finals)
- The winner of the 1934 Brownlow Medal was 19 years old Dick Reynolds of Essendon with 19 votes in his second VFL season.
- North Melbourne took the "wooden spoon" in 1934.
- The seconds premiership was won by Melbourne for the fourth consecutive season. Melbourne 15.18 (108) defeated Geelong 12.4 (76) in the Grand Final, played as a curtain-raiser to the firsts Grand Final on 13 October at the Melbourne Cricket Ground.

== See also ==
- Colin Benham's famous "in-off the small boy" goal

== Sources ==
- 1934 VFL season at AFL Tables
- 1934 VFL season at Australian Football
