= Francis Davies =

Francis Davies may refer to:

- Francis Davies (bishop) (1605–1675), Welsh bishop
- Francis Davies (British Army officer) (1864–1948), British general
- Francis James Davies (1889–1941), flying ace
- Francis James Saunders Davies (1937–2018), Welsh bishop in the Anglican church

== See also ==
- Frank Davies (disambiguation)
- Francis Davis (disambiguation)
