= Leo W. Morgan =

Australian rules footballer, born 1913

Leo Morgan
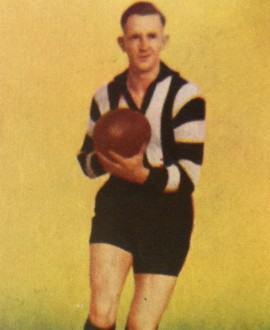
- Morgan in 1938

Personal information
- Full name: Leopold William Stanley Morgan
- Born: 3 May 1913; Kyneton, Victoria
- Died: 31 March 1995 (aged 81)
- Original team: Abbotsford
- Height: 169 cm (5 ft 7 in)
- Weight: 62 kg (137 lb)
- Position: Wingman

Playing career^{1}
Years	Club	Games (Goals)
1933–1941	Collingwood	82 (7)
- ^{1} Playing statistics correct to the end of 1941.

Leopold William Stanley Morgan (3 May 1913 – 31 March 1995) was an Australian rules footballer who played for Collingwood in the Victorian Football League (VFL) during the 1930s and early 1940s.

He made his Collingwood debut in round 14, 1933. He played 82 CFC games with a total of 7 CFC goals.

Small and pacy, Morgan was recruited to Collingwood from Abbotsford. He was a wingman in Collingwood's 1935 and 1936 premiership sides as well as in the losing 1938 Grand Final team.

Morgan later served in the Royal Australian Air Force during World War II.
