= Bob Pratt Jr. =

Australian rules footballer

Personal information
- Full name: Robert Pratt Jr.
- Born: 24 March 1936
- Original team: Canterbury
- Height: 174 cm (5 ft 9 in)
- Weight: 80 kg (176 lb)

Playing career^{1}
Years	Club	Games (Goals)
1955–1958	South Melbourne	35 (35)
- ^{1} Playing statistics correct to the end of 1958.

Robert Pratt Jr. (born 24 March 1936) is a former Australian rules footballer who played with South Melbourne in the Victorian Football League (VFL).

Pratt played as a forward for South Melbourne during his debut season in 1955, including the full-forward position that his father, Bob Pratt Sr., had excelled. He had forced his way into the team after scoring 21 goals from three games in the South Melbourne reserves. Pratt's 24 VFL goals that year were enough to finish second in the South Melbourne goal-kicking and included hauls of five goals against Geelong and six against Richmond.

Pratt was used mostly as a half forward flanker for the rest of his career, which ended in 1958 when he announced his retirement, citing business commitments.
