= Frank Davies (rugby league) =

Wales international rugby league footballer

Personal information
- Full name: Frank Davies
- Born: unknown Yorkshire, England

Playing information
- Position: Second-row
Club
| Years | Team | Pld | T | G | FG | P |
|---|---|---|---|---|---|---|
| 1963–76 | Huddersfield | 268 | 53 | 435 | 0 | 1029 |
| 1976–78 | Hunslet |
| 1978–79 | Bramley |
| | Keighley |
| | Total | 268 | 53 | 435 | 0 | 1029 |
Representative
| Years | Team | Pld | T | G | FG | P |
| 1978 | Wales | 1 |

Frank Davies (birth unknown) is a former professional rugby league footballer who played in the 1960s and 1970s. He played at representative level for Wales, and at club level for Normanton, Huddersfield (13-years), Hunslet, Bramley and Keighley, as a goal-kicking second-row.

== International honours ==
Frank Davies won a cap for Wales while at Hunslet in 1978 against England.
