= Frank Davies (footballer, born 1910) =

Australian rules footballer, born 1910

Personal information
- Full name: Francis Leonard Davies
- Born: 17 May 1910; Sebastopol, Victoria
- Died: 25 October 1989 (aged 79); Clayton, Victoria
- Original team: South Ballarat
- Height: 179 cm (5 ft 10 in)
- Weight: 73 kg (161 lb)

Playing career^{1}
Years	Club	Games (Goals)
1934–1936	South Melbourne	30 (15)
- ^{1} Playing statistics correct to the end of 1936.

Francis Leonard Davies (17 May 1910 – 25 October 1989) was an Australian rules footballer who played with South Melbourne in the Victorian Football League (VFL).

Davies, a South Ballarat recruit, played at South Melbourne for three seasons. He kicked two goals, from a forward pocket, in South Melbourne's 1935 VFL Grand Final loss to Collingwood. In 1934 and 1936, he missed selection in the South Melbourne grand final team, despite playing in their preliminary final win each year.
