= Frank Davis (serial killer) =

American serial killer

Frank R. Davis
- Davis in 1994
- Born: January 29, 1953; Indiana, US
- Died: January 22, 2008 (aged 54); Indiana, US
- Convictions: Murder (2 counts); Attempted murder (2 counts)
- Penalty: Death; commuted to 220 years imprisonment

Details
- Victims: 3
- Span of crimes: 1971–1983
- Country: United States
- State: Indiana

Frank R. Davis (January 29, 1953 – January 22, 2008) was an American serial killer who raped and murdered three teenage boys in Indiana between 1971 and 1983.

== Early life ==
While at a juvenile detention center, Davis was sexually abused by one of the attendants and at least one other inmate. The courts later said the attack that Davis suffered from the fellow inmate was similar to how he assaulted one of his victims.

== Murders ==
On January 10, 1983, Davis confronted a 15-year-old boy at gunpoint, wrapped a wire around his neck, then forced him to perform oral sex. He then pistol-whipped him unconscious. The boy would recover from the attack and identify Davis.

On June 16, 1983, Davis confronted 14-year-old Darrin Reed at knifepoint after the two shared a beer. Davis wrapped a wire around Reed's neck, performed oral sex on him, and then strangled him to death.

On June 18, 1983, two 15-year-old boys, including one named James Harley, were camping when they saw Davis in the woods. Davis was smoking marijuana and shared it with the teenagers. Afterwards, he waited for them to go to sleep. Davis then went into their tent, woke up Lopez, and moved him into the woods at knifepoint. He restrained the boy with wire, performed oral sex on him, and then strangled him to death with the wire. He then returned to the other boy, tied him up with wire, and performed oral sex on him, before striking him in the head with the axe and leaving. The victim survived. Davis's two surviving victims identified him and he gave a full confession. He also confessed to the murder of 13-year-old Duane Bush on June 3, 1971. Bush had been kidnapped, sodomized, and strangled.

== Legal proceedings ==
Davis was charged with two counts of murder for killing Reed and Lopez and two counts of attempted murder for the assaults on the surviving victims. He was convicted of all of the charges and sentenced to death for the two murders. Davis was also given two consecutive 50-year sentences for the two attempted murders. On December 8, 1993, his sentences for the murder convictions were reduced to 60 years each. All of the sentences ran consecutively, leaving Davis with 220 years to serve in prison. He died in prison on January 22, 2008.

== See also ==
- List of serial killers in the United States
