= Roy Selleck =

Australian rules footballer

Personal information
- Full name: Roy William Selleck
- Born: 22 February 1944 (age 82)
- Original team: Parkdale
- Height: 183 cm (6 ft 0 in)
- Weight: 76 kg (168 lb)

Playing career^{1}
Years	Club	Games (Goals)
1962–64	Richmond	24 (2)
- ^{1} Playing statistics correct to the end of 1964.

Roy William Selleck (born 22 February 1944) is a former Australian rules footballer who played with Richmond in the Victorian Football League (VFL).

The son of Roy Selleck Sr., Selleck later played 75 games with Sandringham from 1965 to 1969.
