= Bob Pratt (inventor) =

American inventor

- Born: San Diego, California, U.S.
- Occupation(s): Inventor, aerospace engineer
- Known for: Cannabis vaporizer technology
- Notable work: Co-founder of Herbalizer
- Scientific career
- Fields: Aerospace engineering, cannabis consumption devices

Bob Pratt is an inventor of cannabis consumption devices and a former aerospace engineer. His background in thermal testing for space applications helped him create a fast-heating vaporizer using a compact halogen light as a heat source. Pratt is a co-founder of Herbalizer, a company that develops vaporizers for cannabis use.
