= Keith Fraser (footballer) =

Australian rules footballer, born 1913

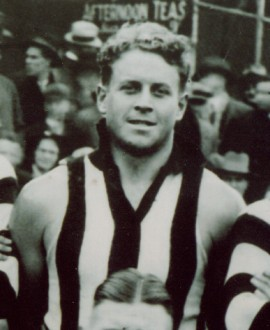
- Fraser during his Collingwood career

Personal information
- Full name: Keith R. Fraser
- Born: 17 April 1913 chelsea
- Died: 13 July 2003 (aged 90)
- Original team: Chelsea
- Height: 183 cm (6 ft 0 in)
- Weight: 92 kg (203 lb)
- Position: Ruckman/Forward

Playing career^{1}
Years	Club	Games (Goals)
1933–1936	Collingwood	62 (9)
- ^{1} Playing statistics correct to the end of 1936.

Career highlights
- Collingwood premiership player - 1935 & 1936

Keith R. Fraser (17 April 1913 – 13 July 2003) was an Australian rules footballer who played for Collingwood in the Victorian Football League (VFL) during the 1930s.

Fraser was primarily a ruckman but took spells in the forward pocket. He played in Collingwood's 1935 premiership side as a forward and participated in another premiership the following season when he was given the role of tagging the South Melbourne rovers. His final league game was the 1936 Grand Final.

In 1937 he had received promotion in the Postal department which necessitated his going to Tasmania. He choose Lefroy to play for and had 21 kicks and 11 marks in their winning 1937 premiership game.

He then went off to coach Cygnet in the Huon FA in 1939.
