= Francis Davis (poet) =

Irish poet and editor

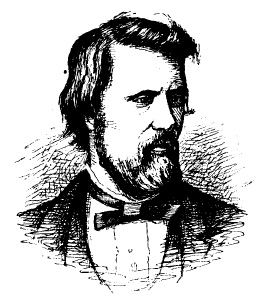
Francis Davis from Poetry and Song of Ireland (1887)

Francis Davis (7 March 1810 – 1881) was an Irish poet and editor.

== Life ==
Francis Davis was born the son of a soldier in Ballincollig, County Cork. His father was a Presbyterian from the north of Ireland, probably near Hillsborough, County Down. His mother, Jane MacFee, whose brother Daniel had been a United Irishman, was from Belfast.

When his father was away during the Napoleonic wars the family lived in Belfast and Hillsborough. His mother died when he was but a boy, and his father then consigned him to the care of a rich but miserly relative, for whom he had to work at the loom. On his father's death, he escaped from this drudgery to Belfast, from where he travelled through England and Scotland, earning his living by his trade as a weaver, and writing poems all the while. At the same time he studied French, Latin, Greek and Gaelic.

In 1843 he settled in Belfast where he became editor of The Belfastman's Journal, and then became a contributor to many periodicals. He contributed many poems to The Nation under the pen-name "The Belfast Man". His poems were collected in several volumes between 1847 and 1863.

He died in Belfast and was buried in Milltown Cemetery.
