= Lou Riley =

Australian rules footballer

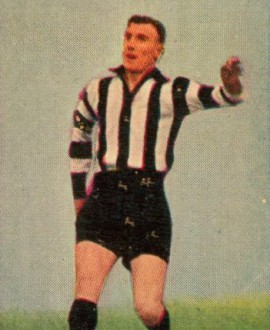
- Riley in 1935

Personal information
- Full name: Louis Andrew Riley
- Born: 7 September 1909; Granville, New South Wales
- Died: 20 April 1989 (aged 79)
- Original team: Golden Point
- Height: 175 cm (5 ft 9 in)
- Weight: 72 kg (159 lb)
- Position: Half forward flank

Playing career^{1}
Years	Club	Games (Goals)
1932–1934	Melbourne	20 (27)
1934–1938	Collingwood	44 (60)
Total		64 (87)
- ^{1} Playing statistics correct to the end of 1938.

Louis Andrew Riley (7 September 1909 – 20 April 1989) was an Australian rules footballer who played for Melbourne and Collingwood in the Victorian Football League (VFL) during the 1930s.

The youngest son of Alexander Riley (1873–1911) and Emily Caroline Riley, née Hele (1874–1963), Louis Andrew Riley was born at Granville, New South Wales in 1909. The family moved to Ballarat while Louis was an infant.

Riley, a half forward flanker, spent two and a half years playing at Melbourne before crossing to Collingwood during the 1934 season. He kicked a career high 38 goals in 1935 and finished the year in a premiership team. Another premiership followed in 1936 and he remained at Collingwood for a further two seasons before retiring.
