= Jack Richardson (footballer, born 1906) =

Australian rules footballer

Personal information
- Full name: John Tasman Richardson
- Born: 6 December 1906; Bellarine, Victoria
- Died: 28 September 1993 (aged 86)
- Original team: Bellarine
- Height: 183 cm (6 ft 0 in)
- Weight: 82 kg (181 lb)

Playing career^{1}
Years	Club	Games (Goals)
1928–1931	South Melbourne	34 (6)
1932	Melbourne	1 (0)
Total		35 (6)
- ^{1} Playing statistics correct to the end of 1932.

John Tasman Richardson (6 December 1906 – 28 September 1993) was an Australian rules footballer who played with South Melbourne and Melbourne in the Victorian Football League (VFL).
