= 1935 VFL season =

39th season of the Victorian Football League (VFL)

1935 VFL premiership season
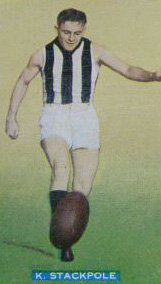
- Premiership player Keith Stackpole
- Teams: 12
- Premiers: Collingwood; 10th premiership
- Minor premiers: South Melbourne; 4th minor premiership
- Brownlow Medallist: Haydn Bunton Sr. (Fitzroy)
- Bob Pratt (South Melbourne)
- Matches played: 112
- Highest: 54,154

The 1935 VFL season was the 39th season of the Victorian Football League (VFL), the highest level senior Australian rules football competition in Victoria. The season featured twelve clubs, ran from 27 April until 5 October, and comprised an 18-game home-and-away season followed by a finals series featuring the top four clubs.

The premiership was won by the Collingwood Football Club for the tenth time, after it defeated South Melbourne by 20 points in the 1935 VFL Grand Final.

== Background ==
In 1935, the VFL competition consisted of twelve teams of 18 on-the-field players each, plus one substitute player, known as the 19th man. A player could be substituted for any reason; however, once substituted, a player could not return to the field of play under any circumstances.

Teams played each other in a home-and-away season of 18 rounds; matches 12 to 18 were the "home-and-way reverse" of matches 1 to 7.

Once the 18 round home-and-away season had finished, the 1935 VFL Premiers were determined by the specific format and conventions of the Page–McIntyre system.

== Home-and-away season ==
=== Round 1 ===
Home team	Home team score	Away team	Away team score	Venue	Crowd	Date
Footscray	7.19 (61)	Richmond	14.12 (96)	Western Oval	17,000	27 April 1935
Collingwood	15.18 (108)	South Melbourne	15.16 (106)	Victoria Park	30,000	27 April 1935
Carlton	14.18 (102)	Geelong	15.18 (108)	Princes Park	23,000	27 April 1935
North Melbourne	12.11 (83)	Hawthorn	14.3 (87)	Arden Street Oval	7,000	27 April 1935
St Kilda	11.14 (80)	Fitzroy	14.8 (92)	Junction Oval	21,000	27 April 1935
Melbourne	15.9 (99)	Essendon	24.15 (159)	MCG	15,615	27 April 1935

=== Round 2 ===
Home team	Home team score	Away team	Away team score	Venue	Crowd	Date
Geelong	14.20 (104)	Melbourne	16.6 (102)	Corio Oval	11,000	4 May 1935
Essendon	13.17 (95)	St Kilda	13.14 (92)	Windy Hill	21,500	4 May 1935
Richmond	14.11 (95)	North Melbourne	10.12 (72)	Punt Road Oval	14,000	4 May 1935
South Melbourne	17.11 (113)	Footscray	15.9 (99)	Lake Oval	28,000	4 May 1935
Fitzroy	14.9 (93)	Collingwood	14.9 (93)	Brunswick Street Oval	36,000	6 May 1935
Hawthorn	9.6 (60)	Carlton	14.27 (111)	Glenferrie Oval	23,000	6 May 1935

=== Round 3 ===
Home team	Home team score	Away team	Away team score	Venue	Crowd	Date
North Melbourne	5.14 (44)	South Melbourne	13.11 (89)	Arden Street Oval	12,500	11 May 1935
Collingwood	21.17 (143)	Essendon	12.11 (83)	Victoria Park	18,000	11 May 1935
Carlton	11.11 (77)	Richmond	10.8 (68)	Princes Park	35,000	11 May 1935
Melbourne	15.19 (109)	Hawthorn	11.13 (79)	MCG	7,788	11 May 1935
St Kilda	18.20 (128)	Geelong	18.15 (123)	Junction Oval	19,000	11 May 1935
Footscray	7.13 (55)	Fitzroy	9.12 (66)	Western Oval	20,000	11 May 1935

=== Round 4 ===
Home team	Home team score	Away team	Away team score	Venue	Crowd	Date
Hawthorn	6.17 (53)	St Kilda	16.8 (104)	Glenferrie Oval	11,000	18 May 1935
Fitzroy	18.16 (124)	North Melbourne	10.14 (74)	Brunswick Street Oval	13,000	18 May 1935
Richmond	18.20 (128)	Melbourne	14.8 (92)	Punt Road Oval	15,000	18 May 1935
Footscray	7.8 (50)	Essendon	16.5 (101)	Western Oval	17,000	18 May 1935
Geelong	14.17 (101)	Collingwood	17.13 (115)	Corio Oval	13,000	18 May 1935
South Melbourne	13.19 (97)	Carlton	14.6 (90)	Lake Oval	35,000	18 May 1935

=== Round 5 ===
Home team	Home team score	Away team	Away team score	Venue	Crowd	Date
Geelong	15.10 (100)	South Melbourne	17.12 (114)	Corio Oval	14,700	25 May 1935
Fitzroy	8.9 (57)	Richmond	14.14 (98)	Brunswick Street Oval	35,000	25 May 1935
Essendon	13.20 (98)	Hawthorn	12.14 (86)	Windy Hill	10,000	25 May 1935
North Melbourne	12.16 (88)	Footscray	13.12 (90)	Arden Street Oval	12,000	25 May 1935
Melbourne	9.15 (69)	Collingwood	13.20 (98)	MCG	16,057	25 May 1935
St Kilda	16.14 (110)	Carlton	20.9 (129)	Junction Oval	29,000	25 May 1935

=== Round 6 ===
Home team	Home team score	Away team	Away team score	Venue	Crowd	Date
Collingwood	23.11 (149)	Footscray	14.14 (98)	Victoria Park	17,500	1 June 1935
Hawthorn	14.9 (93)	Geelong	22.19 (151)	Glenferrie Oval	9,500	1 June 1935
South Melbourne	23.14 (152)	Fitzroy	10.11 (71)	Lake Oval	33,000	1 June 1935
Melbourne	15.13 (103)	St Kilda	15.20 (110)	MCG	22,711	3 June 1935
Essendon	12.13 (85)	Richmond	13.9 (87)	Windy Hill	26,000	3 June 1935
Carlton	20.16 (136)	North Melbourne	9.14 (68)	Princes Park	20,000	3 June 1935

=== Round 7 ===
Home team	Home team score	Away team	Away team score	Venue	Crowd	Date
Richmond	7.17 (59)	South Melbourne	15.15 (105)	Punt Road Oval	35,000	8 June 1935
Fitzroy	14.12 (96)	Hawthorn	13.8 (86)	Brunswick Street Oval	9,000	8 June 1935
North Melbourne	8.11 (59)	Melbourne	18.11 (119)	Arden Street Oval	7,000	8 June 1935
Geelong	16.14 (110)	Essendon	4.12 (36)	Corio Oval	10,000	8 June 1935
St Kilda	16.15 (111)	Collingwood	19.16 (130)	Junction Oval	17,000	8 June 1935
Footscray	12.7 (79)	Carlton	9.25 (79)	Western Oval	15,000	8 June 1935

=== Round 8 ===
Home team	Home team score	Away team	Away team score	Venue	Crowd	Date
Hawthorn	9.23 (77)	South Melbourne	17.14 (116)	Glenferrie Oval	12,000	15 June 1935
Geelong	13.12 (90)	Richmond	10.16 (76)	Corio Oval	13,000	15 June 1935
Essendon	9.7 (61)	Fitzroy	14.19 (103)	Windy Hill	17,000	15 June 1935
Collingwood	16.30 (126)	North Melbourne	6.10 (46)	Victoria Park	8,000	15 June 1935
St Kilda	14.10 (94)	Footscray	7.13 (55)	Junction Oval	20,000	15 June 1935
Melbourne	7.12 (54)	Carlton	9.12 (66)	MCG	19,546	15 June 1935

=== Round 9 ===
Home team	Home team score	Away team	Away team score	Venue	Crowd	Date
North Melbourne	6.9 (45)	St Kilda	8.14 (62)	Arden Street Oval	4,000	22 June 1935
Footscray	5.4 (34)	Melbourne	4.15 (39)	Western Oval	5,500	22 June 1935
Fitzroy	10.5 (65)	Geelong	6.14 (50)	Brunswick Street Oval	8,500	22 June 1935
Carlton	13.9 (87)	Collingwood	8.10 (58)	Princes Park	17,000	22 June 1935
Richmond	14.7 (91)	Hawthorn	10.13 (73)	Punt Road Oval	4,000	22 June 1935
South Melbourne	13.22 (100)	Essendon	9.7 (61)	Lake Oval	8,000	22 June 1935

=== Round 10 ===
Home team	Home team score	Away team	Away team score	Venue	Crowd	Date
Geelong	26.16 (172)	North Melbourne	15.7 (97)	Corio Oval	7,000	29 June 1935
Fitzroy	13.10 (88)	Melbourne	15.17 (107)	Brunswick Street Oval	11,000	29 June 1935
South Melbourne	13.16 (94)	St Kilda	9.15 (69)	Lake Oval	19,000	29 June 1935
Hawthorn	12.13 (85)	Footscray	14.6 (90)	Glenferrie Oval	9,000	29 June 1935
Richmond	11.14 (80)	Collingwood	13.4 (82)	Punt Road Oval	25,000	29 June 1935
Essendon	11.12 (78)	Carlton	22.8 (140)	Windy Hill	18,000	29 June 1935

=== Round 11 ===
Home team	Home team score	Away team	Away team score	Venue	Crowd	Date
Melbourne	11.12 (78)	South Melbourne	18.14 (122)	MCG	19,086	6 July 1935
Footscray	15.13 (103)	Geelong	16.7 (103)	Western Oval	11,000	6 July 1935
Collingwood	17.20 (122)	Hawthorn	12.3 (75)	Victoria Park	8,000	6 July 1935
Carlton	19.21 (135)	Fitzroy	8.6 (54)	Princes Park	24,000	6 July 1935
St Kilda	10.14 (74)	Richmond	7.8 (50)	Junction Oval	20,000	6 July 1935
North Melbourne	10.13 (73)	Essendon	10.14 (74)	Arden Street Oval	8,000	6 July 1935

=== Round 12 ===
Home team	Home team score	Away team	Away team score	Venue	Crowd	Date
Hawthorn	16.18 (114)	North Melbourne	6.10 (46)	Glenferrie Oval	4,000	13 July 1935
Fitzroy	9.10 (64)	St Kilda	12.12 (84)	Brunswick Street Oval	15,000	13 July 1935
Essendon	10.14 (74)	Melbourne	12.21 (93)	Windy Hill	8,000	13 July 1935
Richmond	16.10 (106)	Footscray	3.11 (29)	Punt Road Oval	16,000	13 July 1935
South Melbourne	18.16 (124)	Collingwood	10.11 (71)	Lake Oval	31,000	13 July 1935
Geelong	6.7 (43)	Carlton	11.10 (76)	Corio Oval	14,500	13 July 1935

=== Round 13 ===
Home team	Home team score	Away team	Away team score	Venue	Crowd	Date
North Melbourne	7.6 (48)	Richmond	15.11 (101)	Arden Street Oval	7,000	20 July 1935
Footscray	9.8 (62)	South Melbourne	15.8 (98)	Western Oval	16,000	20 July 1935
Collingwood	14.21 (105)	Fitzroy	12.10 (82)	Victoria Park	18,000	20 July 1935
Carlton	21.16 (142)	Hawthorn	11.10 (76)	Princes Park	12,000	20 July 1935
Melbourne	11.11 (77)	Geelong	6.13 (49)	MCG	12,817	20 July 1935
St Kilda	13.15 (93)	Essendon	11.3 (69)	Junction Oval	16,000	20 July 1935

=== Round 14 ===
Home team	Home team score	Away team	Away team score	Venue	Crowd	Date
Hawthorn	12.10 (82)	Melbourne	14.17 (101)	Glenferrie Oval	7,000	27 July 1935
Fitzroy	14.16 (100)	Footscray	13.15 (93)	Brunswick Street Oval	13,000	27 July 1935
Richmond	14.11 (95)	Carlton	11.14 (80)	Punt Road Oval	30,000	27 July 1935
Geelong	9.14 (68)	St Kilda	13.8 (86)	Corio Oval	7,000	17 August 1935
South Melbourne	16.13 (109)	North Melbourne	15.10 (100)	Lake Oval	7,000	17 August 1935
Essendon	16.10 (106)	Collingwood	16.17 (113)	Windy Hill	11,000	17 August 1935

=== Round 15 ===
Home team	Home team score	Away team	Away team score	Venue	Crowd	Date
Essendon	15.25 (115)	Footscray	12.10 (82)	Windy Hill	11,000	10 August 1935
Collingwood	22.13 (145)	Geelong	16.15 (111)	Victoria Park	9,000	10 August 1935
Carlton	16.26 (122)	South Melbourne	12.9 (81)	Princes Park	40,000	10 August 1935
St Kilda	17.22 (124)	Hawthorn	9.9 (63)	Junction Oval	9,000	10 August 1935
North Melbourne	10.13 (73)	Fitzroy	12.10 (82)	Arden Street Oval	7,000	10 August 1935
Melbourne	10.8 (68)	Richmond	10.15 (75)	MCG	27,572	17 August 1935

=== Round 16 ===
Home team	Home team score	Away team	Away team score	Venue	Crowd	Date
Footscray	8.14 (62)	North Melbourne	10.9 (69)	Western Oval	7,000	24 August 1935
Collingwood	11.13 (79)	Melbourne	10.19 (79)	Victoria Park	10,500	24 August 1935
Carlton	18.22 (130)	St Kilda	16.12 (108)	Princes Park	33,000	24 August 1935
South Melbourne	21.12 (138)	Geelong	8.14 (62)	Lake Oval	12,000	24 August 1935
Richmond	17.16 (118)	Fitzroy	12.9 (81)	Punt Road Oval	16,500	24 August 1935
Hawthorn	8.26 (74)	Essendon	9.12 (66)	Glenferrie Oval	5,000	24 August 1935

=== Round 17 ===
Home team	Home team score	Away team	Away team score	Venue	Crowd	Date
Geelong	7.17 (59)	Hawthorn	13.9 (87)	Corio Oval	2,500	31 August 1935
Fitzroy	11.8 (74)	South Melbourne	10.15 (75)	Brunswick Street Oval	17,000	31 August 1935
St Kilda	19.8 (122)	Melbourne	16.14 (110)	Junction Oval	18,000	31 August 1935
Richmond	12.14 (86)	Essendon	7.16 (58)	Punt Road Oval	13,000	31 August 1935
Footscray	6.17 (53)	Collingwood	12.14 (86)	Western Oval	7,500	31 August 1935
North Melbourne	10.9 (69)	Carlton	16.16 (112)	Arden Street Oval	13,000	31 August 1935

=== Round 18 ===
Home team	Home team score	Away team	Away team score	Venue	Crowd	Date
Melbourne	15.12 (102)	North Melbourne	7.12 (54)	MCG	5,084	7 September 1935
Essendon	14.23 (107)	Geelong	11.13 (79)	Windy Hill	6,000	7 September 1935
Collingwood	9.18 (72)	St Kilda	7.15 (57)	Victoria Park	16,000	7 September 1935
Carlton	20.24 (144)	Footscray	10.17 (77)	Princes Park	12,000	7 September 1935
South Melbourne	14.23 (107)	Richmond	9.9 (63)	Lake Oval	28,000	7 September 1935
Hawthorn	14.26 (110)	Fitzroy	15.6 (96)	Glenferrie Oval	11,000	7 September 1935

== Ladder ==
(P)	Premiers
	Qualified for finals

#	Team	P	W	L	D	PF	PA	%	Pts
1	South Melbourne	18	16	2	0	1940	1410	137.6	64
2	Collingwood (P)	18	14	2	2	1895	1561	121.4	60
3	Carlton	18	14	3	1	1958	1383	141.6	58
4	Richmond	18	12	6	0	1572	1339	117.4	48
5	St Kilda	18	11	7	0	1708	1545	110.6	44
6	Melbourne	18	8	9	1	1601	1582	101.2	34
7	Fitzroy	18	8	9	1	1488	1649	90.2	34
8	Essendon	18	7	11	0	1526	1703	89.6	28
9	Geelong	18	6	11	1	1683	1747	96.3	26
10	Hawthorn	18	5	13	0	1460	1805	80.9	20
11	Footscray	18	2	14	2	1272	1731	73.5	12
12	North Melbourne	18	1	17	0	1208	1856	65.1	4

Rules for classification: 1. premiership points; 2. percentage; 3. points for
Average score: 89.4
Source: AFL Tables

== Finals series ==
All of the 1935 finals were played at the MCG so the home team in the semi-finals and preliminary final is purely the higher ranked team from the ladder but in the Grand Final the home team was the team that won the preliminary final.

=== Semi-finals ===
Home team	Score	Away team	Score	Venue	Crowd	Date
Carlton	14.20 (104)	Richmond	19.11 (125)	MCG	49,759	14 September
South Melbourne	15.14 (104)	Collingwood	11.17 (83)	MCG	53,766	21 September

=== Preliminary final ===
Home team	Score	Away team	Score	Venue	Crowd	Date
Collingwood	14.10 (94)	Richmond	9.12 (66)	MCG	46,191	28 September

== Season notes ==
- In February 1935, the VFL advanced an emergency interest-free loan of £500 to the North Melbourne Football Club, which had not won a match since 19 August 1933.
- The VFL experimented with rubber footballs during pre-season practice matches. The experiment was not successful: the balls were found to float far too much in the air, and bounce far too much on the ground.
- Footscray changed their jumper design from the traditional red and white hoops on a blue background to a jumper with vertical red and blue stripes with white piping. Designed to make the club more distinctive, these jumpers were destroyed when dry-cleaned at the end of the season.
- On 30 March, a practice match between Richmond and South Melbourne was played at night, with a white ball, under electric light at Olympic Park.
- On 18 May, 24-year-old Clen Denning played his first VFL senior match. Playing in the forward-pocket for Carlton, against South Melbourne, he kicked a goal with each of his first six kicks in the match.
- In the third quarter of the round 18 match between Essendon and Geelong, Geelong was clawing back Essendon's lead, when the Windy Hill ground was invaded by a swarm of schoolboys. A small balloon had drifted over the ground and had dropped small parachutes and papers, and the schoolboys invaded the ground to capture the "treasures" dropped from the balloon, oblivious of the fact that the match was still in progress. The match was delayed for some time before order was restored. Essendon eventually won the match 14.23 (107) to 11.13 (79).
- At the end of the 1935 season, the Hawthorn Football Club was unable to make any of its contracted payments to its players, many of whom were unemployed and relying on the £3 weekly match fees to sustain their families.
- On Grand Final eve, South Melbourne's champion full-forward Bob Pratt was hit by a brick truck when alighting from a tram. He was replaced in the team by Roy Moore. Neither Moore at full-forward nor Laurie Nash at centre half-forward scored a goal in the match; their opponents were Charlie Dibbs and Jack Regan respectively.

== Awards ==
- The 1935 VFL Premiership team was Collingwood.
- The VFL's leading goalkicker was Bob Pratt of South Melbourne with 97 goals (103 after finals).
- The winner of the 1935 Brownlow Medal was Haydn Bunton, Sr of Fitzroy with 24 votes.
- North Melbourne took the "wooden spoon" in 1935.
- The seconds premiership was won by Melbourne for the fifth consecutive season. Melbourne defeated Geelong in the Grand Final, played as a curtain-raiser to the firsts Grand Final on 5 October at the Melbourne Cricket Ground.

== Sources ==
- 1935 VFL season at AFL Tables
- 1935 VFL season at Australian Football
