= Frank Davis (Scout) =

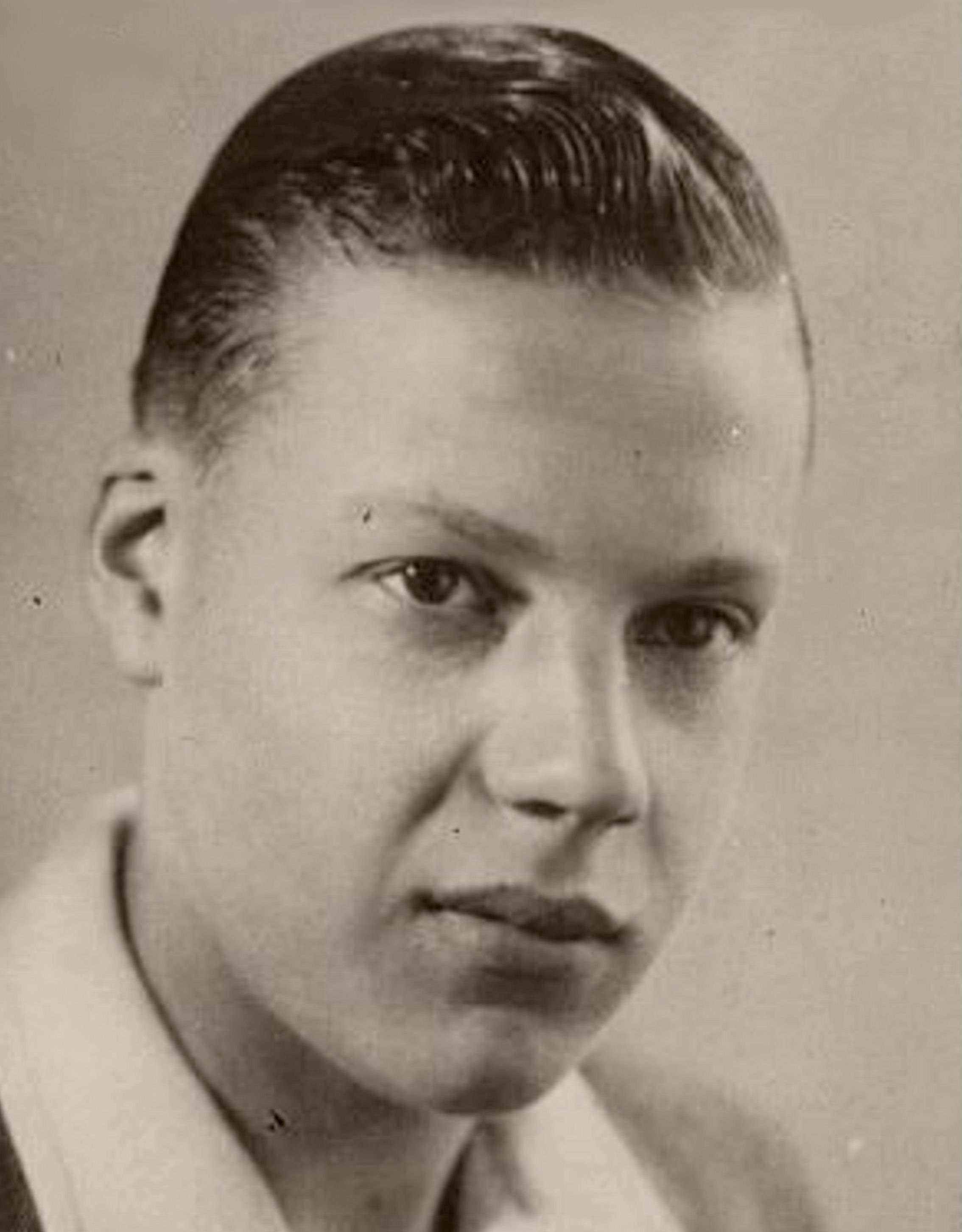
- Frank Davis, in 1940
- Born: 1923
- Died: 8 December 1940 (aged 16–17)
- Occupation: Volunteer Air Raid Precautions Messenger
- Known for: Bravery during the London Blitz

Frank Davis (1923–1940) was a 17 year old Boy Scout who was awarded a posthumous Bronze Cross, Scouting's highest gallantry medal, for his bravery during the London Blitz of World War II as a Volunteer Air Raid Precautions Messenger and in rescuing an injured fellow Scout.

== Life ==
Davis was born in 1923 and lived all his life in Bermondsey, then a London Borough and now part of Southwark. His ambition was to train as a doctor, and he joined the Scouting Association with the intention of learning first aid.

== Death ==
Like tens of thousands of other UK Scouts, Davis used his skills and time to help in the war effort as a member of the 11th Bermondsey Troop. While planning to join the Royal Navy as a sick-bay worker, he joined the St John Ambulance Brigade at the outbreak of the Second World War and became a part-time warden. In December 1840 he was working as a messenger, carrying messages by hand between Civil Defence posts during air raids. According to the Aberdeen Evening Express and the London Evening News, Davis was "known for his friendliness and devoted service to others", and his "readiness to do good turns".

Whilst the original medal commendation has been lost, newspers including the Daily Express describe how Davis and a friend came across a burning incendiary device which had been dropped by a German aircraft on Dockhead, Bermondsey. Whilst trying to cover it with sand, his's friend was injured such that Davis carried him back to the Civil Defence post at The Most Holy Trinity Church. He then returned to the incendiary bomb to finish extinguishing it when two further high explosive bombs detonated and killed him. His body was found soon after. It was 8 December 1940 and he was 17 years old.

Davis's funeral took place on 13 December 1940 at St James's Church, Bermondsey in Thurland Road. He was buried later the same day at Nunhead Cemetery in a plot close to where the Commonwealth War Graves Commission memorial now stands at the Limesford Road Entrance.

== Bronze Cross Medal Award ==
On 5 February 1941, the Scout Association announced Davis was posthumously decorated with a Bronze Cross, known as "The Scout's VC", the senior gallantry medal awarded to scouts. The medal was presented at Manor Church, Galleywall Road, Bermondsey by General Sir John Shea to Davis's parents at the same time as a number of other medals were presented to other Bermondsey Scouts.
